= 2007 K League Championship =

Tournament details
- Host country: South Korea
- Dates: 20 October – 11 November 2007
- Teams: 6

Final positions
- Champions: Pohang Steelers
- Runners-up: Seongnam Ilhwa Chunma

Tournament statistics
- Matches played: 6
- Goals scored: 13 (2.17 per match)
- Attendance: 138,207 (23,035 per match)
- Top scorer: Lee Gwang-jae (3 goals)

The 2007 K League Championship was the eleventh competition of the K League Championship, and was held to decide the 25th champions of the K League. The top six clubs of the regular season qualified for the championship. The winners of the regular season directly qualified for the final, and second place team qualified for the semi-final. The other four clubs entered the first round, and the winners of the second round advanced to the semi-final. Each match was played as a single match, excluding the final which consisted of two matches.

== Qualified teams ==
Pos	Team	Pld	W	D	L	GF	GA	GD	Pts	Qualification
1	Seongnam Ilhwa Chunma	26	16	7	3	43	18	+25	55	Qualification for the playoffs final
2	Suwon Samsung Bluewings	26	15	6	5	36	24	+12	51	Qualification for the playoffs semi-final
3	Ulsan Hyundai Horang-i	26	12	9	5	34	22	+12	45	Qualification for the playoffs first round
4	Gyeongnam FC	26	13	4	9	41	31	+10	43	Qualification for the playoffs first round
5	Pohang Steelers	26	12	5	9	27	31	−4	41	Qualification for the playoffs first round
6	Daejeon Citizen	26	10	7	9	34	27	+7	37	Qualification for the playoffs first round

Source: RSSSF

== Bracket ==
First round
3	Ulsan Hyundai Horang-i	2
6	Daejeon Citizen	0
4	Gyeongnam FC	1 (3)
5	Pohang Steelers (p)	1 (4)

Second round
Ulsan Hyundai Horang-i	1
Pohang Steelers	2

Semifinal
2	Suwon Samsung Bluewings	0
Pohang Steelers	1

Final
1	Seongnam Ilhwa Chunma	1	0	1
Pohang Steelers	3	1	4

== First round ==
=== Gyeongnam vs Pohang ===
20 October 2007
19:00 KST

Gyeongnam FC	1–1 (a.e.t.)	Pohang Steelers
Cabore 86'	Report	Lee Gwang-jae 68'
Penalties
Jung Yoon-sung (penalty scored); Kim Sung-kil (penalty scored); Cabore (penalty missed); Rogério Pinheiro (penalty scored); Kim Geun-chol (penalty missed)	3–4	(penalty missed) Tavares; (penalty scored) Hwang Ji-soo; (penalty scored) Hwang Jae-won; (penalty scored) Kim Soo-yeon; (penalty scored) Kim Gi-dong

Changwon Stadium, Changwon
Attendance: 8,965
Referee: Lee Young-chul (South Korea)

Gyeongnam FC	Pohang Steelers

GK	21	(South Korea) Lee Jung-rae		(substituted off) 118'
CB	27	(South Korea) Kang Ki-won
CB	4	(Brazil) Rogério Pinheiro	(yellow card) 5'
CB	5	(South Korea) Kim Dae-keon
DM	16	(South Korea) Lee Sang-hong
MF	3	(South Korea) Park Jong-woo		(substituted off) 72'
MF	19	(South Korea) Park Jin-yi	(yellow card) 29'	(substituted off) 103'
MF	8	(South Korea) Kim Hyo-il		(substituted off) 71'
MF	24	(South Korea) Lee Yong-seung		(substituted off) 77'
FW	28	(South Korea) Jung Yoon-sung
FW	9	(Brazil) Cabore
Substitutes:
GK	1	(South Korea) Lee Kwang-suk		(substituted on) 118'
DF	2	(South Korea) Kim Jong-hoon
MF	7	(South Korea) Kim Sung-kil		(substituted on) 72'
MF	14	(South Korea) Kim Geun-chol		(substituted on) 103'
FW	10	(Brazil) Popo		(substituted on) 71'
FW	23	(South Korea) Gong O-kyun	(yellow card) 107'	(substituted on) 77'
Manager:
(South Korea) Park Hang-seo

GK	31	(South Korea) Jung Sung-ryong	(yellow card) 15'	(substituted off) 118'
DF	4	(South Korea) Lee Chang-won
DF	24	(South Korea) Hwang Jae-won
DF	26	(South Korea) Kim Soo-yeon	(yellow card) 90'
MF	2	(South Korea) Choi Hyo-jin
MF	9	(South Korea) Hwang Ji-soo
MF	6	(South Korea) Kim Gi-dong
MF	19	(South Korea) Park Won-jae	(yellow card) 108'
OM	10	(Brazil) Tavares
FW	20	(Brazil) Schwenck		(substituted off) 94'
FW	15	(Brazil) Jonhes		(substituted off) 67'
Substitutes:
GK	21	(South Korea) Shin Hwa-yong		(substituted on) 118'
DF	22	(South Korea) Lee Won-jae
MF	7	(South Korea) Oh Seung-bum
MF	8	(South Korea) Hwang Jin-sung
FW	16	(South Korea) Choi Tae-uk		(substituted on) 94'
FW	17	(South Korea) Lee Gwang-jae		(substituted on) 67'
Manager:
(Brazil) Sérgio Farias

Assistant referees:
Kang Chang-koo (South Korea)
Kim Jung-sik (South Korea)
Fourth official:
Hong Jin-ho (South Korea)

=== Ulsan vs Daejeon ===
21 October 2007
15:00 KST

Ulsan Hyundai Horang-i	2–0	Daejeon Citizen
Lee Sang-ho 39'; Park Dong-hyuk 69'	Report

Ulsan Munsu Football Stadium, Ulsan
Attendance: 23,836
Referee: Choi Gwang-bo (South Korea)

Ulsan Hyundai Horang-i	Daejeon Citizen

GK	1	(South Korea) Kim Young-kwang	(red card) 82'
CB	3	(South Korea) Park Byung-gyu
CB	5	(South Korea) Yoo Kyoung-youl
CB	6	(South Korea) Park Dong-hyuk
MF	17	(South Korea) Lee Jong-min
MF	16	(South Korea) Oh Jang-eun		(substituted off) 90+5'
MF	13	(South Korea) Hyun Young-min
MF	15	(South Korea) Kim Young-sam	(yellow card) 90+5'
OM	7	(Brazil) Almir		(substituted off) 61'
FW	8	(South Korea) Lee Sang-ho		(substituted off) 85'
FW	22	(South Korea) Woo Sung-yong	(yellow card) 57'
Substitutes:
GK	31	(South Korea) Kim Jee-hyuk		(substituted on) 85'
DF	24	(South Korea) Seo Deok-kyu		(substituted on) 90+5'
MF	20	(South Korea) Choi Sung-yong
MF	14	(South Korea) Jang Sang-won
FW	11	(South Korea) Yeom Ki-hun		(substituted on) 61'
FW	9	(Brazil) Leandro Machado
Manager:
(South Korea) Kim Jung-nam

GK	21	(South Korea) Choi Eun-sung
DF	17	(South Korea) Jang Hyun-kyu
DF	32	(South Korea) Kim Hyung-il	(yellow card) 52'
DF	6	(South Korea) Min Young-ki
DF	3	(South Korea) Ju Seung-jin
MF	30	(South Korea) Park Do-hyun		(substituted off) 63'
MF	10	(South Korea) Ko Jong-soo
MF	14	(South Korea) Lee Sung-woon		(substituted off) 55'
FW	28	(Brazil) Brasília		(substituted off) 67'
FW	8	(Brazil) Denilson
FW	27	(Brazil) Adriano Chuva	(yellow card) 3'
Substitutes:
GK	18	(South Korea) Yang Dong-won
DF	11	(South Korea) Choi Kun-sik		(substituted on) 67'
DF	33	(South Korea) Lee Se-in
MF	20	(South Korea) Choi Yoon-yeol
MF	38	(South Korea) Kang Jung-hun		(substituted on) 55'
MF	13	(South Korea) Na Kwang-hyun	(yellow card) 90+4'	(substituted on) 63'
Manager:
(South Korea) Kim Ho

Assistant referees:
Won Chang-ho (South Korea)
Kang Yi-sung (South Korea)
Fourth official:
Ahn Yong-hee (South Korea)

== Second round ==
28 October 2007
15:00 KST

Ulsan Hyundai Horang-i	1–2	Pohang Steelers
Woo Sung-yong 70'	Report	Hwang Jae-won 34'; Lee Gwang-jae 76'

Ulsan Munsu Football Stadium, Ulsan
Attendance: 31,783
Referee: Felix Brych (Germany)

Ulsan Hyundai Horang-i	Pohang Steelers

GK	31	(South Korea) Kim Jee-hyuk
CB	3	(South Korea) Park Byung-gyu
CB	5	(South Korea) Yoo Kyoung-youl
CB	6	(South Korea) Park Dong-hyuk
RM	17	(South Korea) Lee Jong-min
CM	16	(South Korea) Oh Jang-eun
CM	15	(South Korea) Kim Young-sam		(substituted off) 45'
LM	13	(South Korea) Hyun Young-min	(yellow card) 15'
OM	7	(Brazil) Almir		(substituted off) 79'
FW	8	(South Korea) Lee Sang-ho
FW	22	(South Korea) Woo Sung-yong
Substitutes:
GK	21	(South Korea) Bae Kwan-young
DF	24	(South Korea) Seo Deok-kyu
MF	20	(South Korea) Choi Sung-yong
MF	14	(South Korea) Jang Sang-won
FW	11	(South Korea) Yeom Ki-hun		(substituted on) 45'
FW	9	(Brazil) Leandro Machado		(substituted on) 79'
Manager:
(South Korea) Kim Jung-nam

GK	31	(South Korea) Jung Sung-ryong
CB	4	(South Korea) Lee Chang-won
CB	24	(South Korea) Hwang Jae-won
CB	26	(South Korea) Kim Soo-yeon	(yellow card) 12'	(substituted off) 20'
RM	2	(South Korea) Choi Hyo-jin
CM	9	(South Korea) Hwang Ji-soo
CM	6	(South Korea) Kim Gi-dong
LM	19	(South Korea) Park Won-jae
OM	10	(Brazil) Tavares
FW	20	(Brazil) Schwenck		(substituted off) 67'
FW	15	(Brazil) Jonhes		(substituted off) 86'
Substitutes:
GK	21	(South Korea) Shin Hwa-yong
DF	3	(South Korea) Kim Gwang-seok		(substituted on) 20'
MF	7	(South Korea) Oh Seung-bum		(substituted on) 86'
MF	8	(South Korea) Hwang Jin-sung
FW	16	(South Korea) Choi Tae-uk
FW	17	(South Korea) Lee Gwang-jae		(substituted on) 67'
Manager:
(Brazil) Sérgio Farias

Assistant referees:
Kim Kye-soo (South Korea)
Jung Hae-sang (South Korea)
Fourth official:
Lee Jong-gook (South Korea)

== Semi-final ==
31 October 2007
19:30 KST

Suwon Samsung Bluewings	0–1	Pohang Steelers
	Report	Park Won-jae 86'

Seoul World Cup Stadium, Seoul
Attendance: 33,824
Referee: Markus Schmidt (Germany)

Suwon Samsung Bluewings	Pohang Steelers

GK	1	(South Korea) Lee Woon-jae
RB	8	(South Korea) Song Chong-gug
CB	29	(South Korea) Kwak Hee-ju		(substituted off) 23'
CB	2	(Croatia) Mato Neretljak
LB	30	(South Korea) Yang Sang-min
CM	5	(South Korea) Kim Nam-il	(yellow card) 30'
CM	6	(South Korea) Cho Won-hee
OM	13	(South Korea) Lee Kwan-woo
RW	9	(Brazil) Edu
LW	17	(South Korea) Park Sung-bae	(yellow card) 60'	(substituted off) 66'
FW	27	(South Korea) Seo Dong-hyeon
Substitutes:
GK	21	(South Korea) Kim Dae-hwan
DF	14	(South Korea) Moon Min-kui		(substituted on) 23'
DF	15	(South Korea) Lee Sa-vik		(substituted on) 66'
FW	10	(South Korea) Ahn Jung-hwan
FW	18	(South Korea) Shin Young-rok
FW	19	(South Korea) Namgoong Woong
Manager:
(South Korea) Cha Bum-kun

GK	31	(South Korea) Jung Sung-ryong
CB	3	(South Korea) Kim Gwang-seok
CB	24	(South Korea) Hwang Jae-won
CB	37	(South Korea) Cho Sung-hwan
RM	2	(South Korea) Choi Hyo-jin
CM	9	(South Korea) Hwang Ji-soo
CM	6	(South Korea) Kim Gi-dong
LM	19	(South Korea) Park Won-jae
OM	10	(Brazil) Tavares		(substituted off) 90'
FW	20	(Brazil) Schwenck		(substituted off) 79'
FW	15	(Brazil) Jonhes		(substituted off) 71'
Substitutes:
GK	21	(South Korea) Shin Hwa-yong
DF	4	(South Korea) Lee Chang-won
MF	7	(South Korea) Oh Seung-bum		(substituted on) 90'
MF	8	(South Korea) Hwang Jin-sung		(substituted on) 79'
FW	17	(South Korea) Lee Gwang-jae	(yellow card) 73'	(substituted on) 71'
FW	18	(South Korea) Ko Ki-gu
Manager:
(Brazil) Sérgio Farias

Assistant referees:
Kang Chang-koo (South Korea)
Kim Yong-soo (South Korea)
Fourth official:
{Hong Jin-ho (South Korea)

== Final ==
=== First leg ===
4 November 2007
15:00 KST

Pohang Steelers	3–1	Seongnam Ilhwa Chunma
Park Won-jae 31'; Ko Ki-gu 73'; Lee Gwang-jae 74'	Report	Jang Hak-young 90+1'

Pohang Steel Yard, Pohang
Attendance: 20,875
Referee: Christian Fischer (Germany)

Pohang Steelers	Seongnam Ilhwa Chunma

GK	31	(South Korea) Jung Sung-ryong
CB	3	(South Korea) Kim Gwang-seok
CB	24	(South Korea) Hwang Jae-won	(yellow card) 67'
CB	37	(South Korea) Cho Sung-hwan
RM	2	(South Korea) Choi Hyo-jin
CM	9	(South Korea) Hwang Ji-soo
CM	6	(South Korea) Kim Gi-dong
LM	19	(South Korea) Park Won-jae
OM	10	(Brazil) Tavares		(substituted off) 87'
FW	20	(Brazil) Schwenck		(substituted off) 66'
FW	15	(Brazil) Jonhes		(substituted off) 45'
Substitutes:
GK	21	(South Korea) Shin Hwa-yong
DF	4	(South Korea) Lee Chang-won
MF	7	(South Korea) Oh Seung-bum		(substituted on) 87'
MF	8	(South Korea) Hwang Jin-sung
FW	17	(South Korea) Lee Gwang-jae		(substituted on) 66'
FW	18	(South Korea) Ko Ki-gu		(substituted on) 45'
Manager:
(Brazil) Sérgio Farias

GK	40	(South Korea) Kim Yong-dae
RB	2	(South Korea) Park Jin-sub	(yellow card) 56'
CB	20	(South Korea) Kim Young-chul
CB	5	(South Korea) Cho Byung-kuk
LB	8	(South Korea) Jang Hak-young
DM	14	(South Korea) Kim Sang-sik
CM	6	(South Korea) Son Dae-ho		(substituted off) 71'
CM	8	(South Korea) Kim Do-heon
RW	12	(South Korea) Nam Ki-il
LW	7	(South Korea) Choi Sung-kuk		(substituted off) 61'
FW	10	(Brazil) Itamar	(yellow card) 32'	(substituted off) 77'
Substitutes:
GK	1	(South Korea) Kim Hae-woon
DF	3	(South Korea) Cho Yong-hyung
DF	4	(South Korea) Kim Tae-yoon
MF	15	(South Korea) Han Dong-won		(substituted on) 71'
FW	9	(South Korea) Kim Dong-hyun		(substituted on) 61'
FW	24	(South Korea) Kim Min-ho		(substituted on) 77'
Manager:
(South Korea) Kim Hak-bum

Assistant referees:
Kim Kye-soo (South Korea)
Kim Jung-sik (South Korea)
Fourth official:
Choi Gwang-bo (South Korea)

=== Second leg ===
11 November 2007
15:00 KST

Seongnam Ilhwa Chunma	0–1	Pohang Steelers
	Report	Schwenck 43'

Tancheon Sports Complex, Seongnam
Attendance: 18,924
Referee: Peter Gagelmann (Germany)

Seongnam Ilhwa Chunma	Pohang Steelers

GK	40	(South Korea) Kim Yong-dae
RB	2	(South Korea) Park Jin-sub		(substituted off) 76'
CB	20	(South Korea) Kim Young-chul
CB	5	(South Korea) Cho Byung-kuk
LB	8	(South Korea) Jang Hak-young
DM	14	(South Korea) Kim Sang-sik	(yellow card) 84'
CM	6	(South Korea) Son Dae-ho		(substituted off) 72'
CM	8	(South Korea) Kim Do-heon
RW	12	(South Korea) Nam Ki-il		(substituted off) 45'
LW	7	(South Korea) Choi Sung-kuk
FW	9	(South Korea) Kim Dong-hyun
Substitutes:
GK	1	(South Korea) Kim Hae-woon
DF	3	(South Korea) Cho Yong-hyung		(substituted on) 76'
DF	4	(South Korea) Kim Tae-yoon
MF	15	(South Korea) Han Dong-won
FW	10	(Brazil) Itamar	(yellow card) 62'	(substituted on) 45'
FW	24	(South Korea) Kim Min-ho		(substituted on) 72'
Manager:
(South Korea) Kim Hak-bum

GK	31	(South Korea) Jung Sung-ryong
CB	3	(South Korea) Kim Gwang-seok
CB	24	(South Korea) Hwang Jae-won
CB	37	(South Korea) Cho Sung-hwan	(yellow card) 54'
RM	2	(South Korea) Choi Hyo-jin
CM	9	(South Korea) Hwang Ji-soo		(substituted off) 59'
CM	6	(South Korea) Kim Gi-dong
LM	19	(South Korea) Park Won-jae
OM	10	(Brazil) Tavares	(yellow card) 55'
FW	18	(South Korea) Ko Ki-gu		(substituted off) 56'
FW	20	(Brazil) Schwenck		(substituted off) 90'
Substitutes:
GK	21	(South Korea) Shin Hwa-yong
DF	4	(South Korea) Lee Chang-won		(substituted on) 90'
MF	7	(South Korea) Oh Seung-bum		(substituted on) 59'
MF	8	(South Korea) Hwang Jin-sung
FW	16	(South Korea) Choi Tae-uk
FW	17	(South Korea) Lee Gwang-jae		(substituted on) 56'
Manager:
(Brazil) Sérgio Farias

Assistant referees:
Kang Chang-koo (South Korea)
Son Jae-sun (South Korea)
Fourth official:
Lee Min-hoo (South Korea)

Pohang Steelers won 4–1 on aggregate.

== Final table ==
Pos	Team	Qualification
1	Pohang Steelers (C)	Qualification for the Champions League
2	Seongnam Ilhwa Chunma	
3	Suwon Samsung Bluewings	
4	Ulsan Hyundai Horang-i	
5	Gyeongnam FC	
6	Daejeon Citizen	

Source: RSSSF
(C) Champions

== See also ==
- 2007 in South Korean football
- 2007 K League
