= 2008 Korean FA Cup final =

- Event: 2008 Korean FA Cup
Gyeongnam FC	Pohang Steelers
0	2
- Date: 21 December 2008
- Venue: Jeju Stadium, Jeju City
- Man of the Match: Choi Hyo-jin (Pohang Steelers)
- Referee: Choi Kwang-bo
- Attendance: 1,000

The 2008 Korean FA Cup final was a football match played on 21 December 2008 at Jeju Stadium in Jeju City that decided the champions of the 2008 Korean FA Cup. It was contested between Gyeongnam FC and Pohang Steelers, and kicked off at 13:25 (KST).

== Road to the final ==
Gyeongnam FC		Round	Pohang Steelers	
Opponent	Result	Round	Opponent	Result
Busan Transportation Corporation (A)	1–0	Fourth round	Bye	
Yonsei University (H)	1–0	Round of 16	Jeonnam Dragons (A)	1–0
Gwangju Sangmu (H)	1–0	Quarter-finals	Seongnam Ilhwa Chunma (H)	1–1 (8–7 p)
Goyang KB Kookmin Bank (N)	5–0	Semi-finals	Daegu FC (N)	2–0

== Details ==
21 December 2008
13:25 KST

Gyeongnam FC	0–2	Pohang Steelers
		Hwang Jin-sung 3'; Kim Jae-sung 78'

Jeju Stadium, Jeju City
Attendance: 1,000
Referee: Choi Kwang-bo

Gyeongnam FC	Pohang Steelers

GK	1	(South Korea) Lee Kwang-suk
CB	2	(South Korea) Kim Jong-hoon	(yellow card) 26'
CB	4	(Brazil) Rogério Pinheiro		(substituted off) 60'
CB	33	(South Korea) Park Jae-hong
RM	12	(South Korea) Park Yun-hwa	(yellow card) 43'	(substituted off) 76'
CM	13	(South Korea) Park Jin-yi
CM	30	(South Korea) Lee Sang-min		(substituted off) 75'
LM	16	(South Korea) Lee Sang-hong (c)
AM	23	(South Korea) Kim Dong-chan
CF	22	(South Korea) Seo Sang-min
CF	10	(Brazil) Índio
Substitutes:
GK	21	(South Korea) Shin Seung-kyung
DF	5	(South Korea) Kim Dae-keon
MF	3	(South Korea) Park Jong-woo
MF	24	(South Korea) Kim Young-woo		(substituted on) 60'
FW	9	(Brazil) Almir
FW	18	(South Korea) Kim Jin-yong		(substituted on) 75'
FW	28	(South Korea) Jung Yoon-sung		(substituted on) 76'
Manager:
(South Korea) Cho Kwang-rae

GK	31	(South Korea) Kim Jee-hyuk
CB	37	(South Korea) Cho Sung-hwan
CB	24	(South Korea) Hwang Jae-won (c)
CB	22	(South Korea) Jang Hyun-kyu
RM	2	(South Korea) Choi Hyo-jin	(yellow card) 38'
CM	9	(South Korea) Hwang Ji-soo
CM	25	(South Korea) Shin Hyung-min	(yellow card) 45'
LM	19	(South Korea) Park Won-jae
AM	8	(South Korea) Hwang Jin-sung	(yellow card) 45'	(substituted off) 71'
CF	10	(Brazil) Denílson	(yellow card) 17'	(substituted off) 90+1'
CF	99	(North Macedonia) Stevica Ristić		(substituted off) 70'
Substitutes:
GK	1	(South Korea) Shin Hwa-yong
DF	3	(South Korea) Kim Gwang-seok
DF	12	(South Korea) Park Hee-chul
DF	14	(South Korea) Kim Hyung-il
MF	6	(South Korea) Kim Gi-dong
MF	7	(South Korea) Kim Jae-sung		(substituted on) 71'
FW	17	(South Korea) Lee Gwang-jae		(substituted on) 70'
FW	18	(South Korea) Namgung Do
FW	33	(South Korea) No Byung-jun		(substituted on) 90+1'
Manager:
(Brazil) Sérgio Farias

Man of the Match:
Choi Hyo-jin (Pohang Steelers)

Assistant referees:
Yoon Soon-yong
Choi Min-byung
Fourth official:
Seo Dong-jin

Match rules

- 90 minutes
- 30 minutes of extra time if necessary
- Penalty shoot-out if scores still level
- Nine named substitutes
- Maximum of three substitutions

== See also ==
- 2008 Korean FA Cup
