= 2007 Korean FA Cup final =

- Event: 2007 Korean FA Cup
Jeonnam Dragons	Pohang Steelers
6	3

First leg
Jeonnam Dragons	Pohang Steelers
3	2
- Date: 25 November 2007
- Venue: Gwangyang Football Stadium, Gwangyang
- Referee: Lee Young-chul
- Attendance: 11,361

Second leg
Pohang Steelers	Jeonnam Dragons
1	3
- Date: 2 December 2007
- Venue: Pohang Steel Yard, Pohang
- Man of the Match: Kim Chi-woo (Jeonnam Dragons)
- Referee: Kwon Jong-chul
- Attendance: 16,312

The 2007 Korean FA Cup final was a two-legged football match played on 25 November and 2 December 2007 that decided the champions of the 2007 Korean FA Cup. It was contested between Jeonnam Dragons and Pohang Steelers, and kicked off at 15:00 (KST).

== Road to the final ==
Jeonnam Dragons		Round	Pohang Steelers	
Opponent	Result	Round	Opponent	Result
Bye		Third round	Konkuk University (H)	4–1
Jeonbuk Hyundai Motors (H)	1–0	Round of 16	Goyang Kookmin Bank (A)	2–2 (4–2 p)
Ulsan Hyundai Horang-i (H)	0–0 (4–2 p)	Quarter-finals	Hyundai Mipo Dockyard (A)	2–0
Incheon United (H)	2–0	Semi-finals	Jeju United (H)	2–1

== Details ==
=== First leg ===
25 November 2007
15:00 KST

Jeonnam Dragons	3–2	Pohang Steelers
Kim Chi-woo 21'; Kim Seung-hyun 81'; Kwak Tae-hwi 86'		Tavares 24' (pen.); Kim Gwang-seok 50'

Gwangyang Football Stadium, Gwangyang
Attendance: 11,961
Referee: Lee Young-chul

Jeonnam Dragons	Pohang Steelers

GK	21	(South Korea) Yeom Dong-gyun
CB	4	(South Korea) Kang Min-soo
CB	17	(South Korea) Lee Jun-ki		(substituted off) 58'
CB	5	(South Korea) Kwak Tae-hwi
RM	14	(South Korea) Kim Chi-woo
CM	22	(South Korea) Kim Sung-jae		(substituted off) 58*'
CM	8	(South Korea) Kim Tae-su		(substituted off) 69'
LM	12	(South Korea) Lee Sang-il
AM	9	(South Korea) Song Jung-hyun (c)
CF	11	(Brazil) Sandro Hiroshi
CF	18	(Brazil) Victor Simões	(yellow card) 39'
Substitutes:
GK	61	(South Korea) Cha Gi-suk
DF	2	(South Korea) Lee Wan
DF	25	(South Korea) Lee Kyu-ro		(substituted on) 58'
DF	34	(South Korea) Park Ji-yong
MF	15	(South Korea) Baek Seung-min
MF	16	(South Korea) Lim Kwan-sik		(substituted on) 58*'
FW	19	(South Korea) Kim Seung-hyun		(substituted on) 69'
Manager:
(South Korea) Huh Jung-moo

GK	31	(South Korea) Jung Sung-ryong
CB	3	(South Korea) Kim Gwang-seok
CB	24	(South Korea) Hwang Jae-won
CB	37	(South Korea) Cho Sung-hwan	(yellow card) 63'
RM	13	(South Korea) Shin Kwang-hoon
CM	6	(South Korea) Kim Gi-dong (c)
CM	9	(South Korea) Hwang Ji-soo	(yellow card) 9'
LM	19	(South Korea) Park Won-jae
AM	10	(Brazil) André Luiz Tavares		(substituted off) 90+1'
CF	18	(South Korea) Ko Ki-gu		(substituted off) 59'
CF	20	(Brazil) Schwenck	(yellow card) 83'	(substituted off) 84'
Substitutes:
GK	21	(South Korea) Shin Hwa-yong
DF	4	(South Korea) Lee Chang-won
DF	22	(South Korea) Lee Won-jae
MF	7	(South Korea) Oh Seung-bum
MF	8	(South Korea) Hwang Jin-sung		(substituted on) 84'
MF	16	(South Korea) Choi Tae-uk		(substituted on) 90+1'
FW	17	(South Korea) Lee Gwang-jae		(substituted on) 59'
Manager:
(Brazil) Sérgio Farias

Assistant referees:
Kim Kye-soo
Yang Byung-eun
Fourth official:
Yoo Seon-ho

Match rules

- 90 minutes
- 30 minutes of extra time if necessary
- Penalty shoot-out if scores still level
- Seven named substitutes
- Maximum of three substitutions

=== Second leg ===
25 November 2007
15:00 KST

Pohang Steelers	1–3	Jeonnam Dragons
Hwang Jin-sung 48'		Song Jung-hyun 35', 80'; Sandro Hiroshi 83'

Pohang Steel Yard, Pohang
Attendance: 16,312
Referee: Kwon Jong-chul

Pohang Steelers	Jeonnam Dragons

GK	31	(South Korea) Jung Sung-ryong
CB	4	(South Korea) Lee Chang-won
CB	24	(South Korea) Hwang Jae-won
CB	3	(South Korea) Kim Gwang-seok
RM	2	(South Korea) Choi Hyo-jin	(yellow card) 69'
CM	6	(South Korea) Kim Gi-dong (c)		(substituted off) 13'
CM	9	(South Korea) Hwang Ji-soo
LM	19	(South Korea) Park Won-jae
AM	10	(Brazil) Tavares
CF	18	(South Korea) Ko Ki-gu		(substituted off) 53'
CF	20	(Brazil) Schwenck		(substituted off) 46'
Substitutes:
GK	21	(South Korea) Shin Hwa-yong
DF	22	(South Korea) Lee Won-jae
DF	26	(South Korea) Kim Soo-yeon
MF	7	(South Korea) Oh Seung-bum		(substituted on) 13'
MF	8	(South Korea) Hwang Jin-sung		(substituted on) 46'
MF	16	(South Korea) Choi Tae-uk
FW	17	(South Korea) Lee Gwang-jae		(substituted on) 53'
Manager:
(Brazil) Sérgio Farias

GK	21	(South Korea) Yeom Dong-gyun
CB	4	(South Korea) Kang Min-soo
CB	17	(South Korea) Lee Jun-ki
CB	5	(South Korea) Kwak Tae-hwi
RM	14	(South Korea) Kim Chi-woo	(yellow card) 90+2'
CM	22	(South Korea) Kim Sung-jae	(yellow card) 57'	(substituted off) 71'
CM	8	(South Korea) Kim Tae-su	(yellow card) 33'	(substituted off) 61'
LM	12	(South Korea) Lee Sang-il		(substituted off) 78'
AM	9	(South Korea) Song Jung-hyun (c)
CF	11	(Brazil) Sandro Hiroshi
CF	18	(Brazil) Victor Simões	(yellow card) 85'
Substitutes:
GK	61	(South Korea) Cha Gi-suk
DF	25	(South Korea) Lee Kyu-ro		(substituted on) 61'
DF	34	(South Korea) Park Ji-yong
DF	42	(South Korea) Kang Yong
MF	15	(South Korea) Baek Seung-min		(substituted on) 78'
MF	16	(South Korea) Lim Kwan-sik		(substituted on) 71'
FW	19	(South Korea) Kim Seung-hyun
Manager:
(South Korea) Huh Jung-moo

Man of the Match:
Kim Chi-woo (Jeonnam Dragons)

Assistant referees:
Kim Kye-soo
Yang Byung-eun
Fourth official:
Yoo Seon-ho

Match rules

- 90 minutes
- 30 minutes of extra time if necessary
- Penalty shoot-out if scores still level
- Seven named substitutes
- Maximum of three substitutions

== See also ==
- 2007 Korean FA Cup
