= 2006 K League Championship =

Tournament details
- Host country: South Korea
- Dates: 11–25 November 2006
- Teams: 4

Final positions
- Champions: Seongnam Ilhwa Chunma
- Runners-up: Suwon Samsung Bluewings

Tournament statistics
- Matches played: 4
- Goals scored: 6 (1.5 per match)
- Attendance: 110,456 (27,614 per match)
- Top scorer(s): Mota (3 goals)

The 2006 K League Championship was the tenth competition of the K League Championship, and was held to decide the 24th champions of the K League. After the regular season was finished, the first stage winners, the second stage winners, and the top two clubs in the overall table qualified for the championship. Each semi-final was played as a single match, and the final consisted of two matches.

== Qualified teams ==
Club	Placement
Seongnam Ilhwa Chunma	First stage winners Overall table 1st place
Suwon Samsung Bluewings	Second stage winners Overall table 3rd place
Pohang Steelers	Overall table 2nd place
FC Seoul	Overall table 4th place

== Bracket ==
Semi-finals
Seongnam Ilhwa Chunma	1
FC Seoul	0
Suwon Samsung Bluewings	1
Pohang Steelers	0

Final
Seongnam Ilhwa Chunma	1	2	3
Suwon Samsung Bluewings	0	1	1

== Semi-finals ==
=== Seongnam vs Seoul ===
11 November 2006
14:00 KST

Seongnam Ilhwa Chunma	1–0	FC Seoul
Mota 40'	Report

Tancheon Sports Complex, Seongnam
Attendance: 13,237
Referee: Lee Young-chul (South Korea)

Seongnam Ilhwa Chunma	FC Seoul

GK	40	(South Korea) Kim Yong-dae
RB	2	(South Korea) Park Jin-sub		(substituted off) 77'
CB	20	(South Korea) Kim Young-chul
CB	5	(South Korea) Cho Byung-kuk
LB	8	(South Korea) Jang Hak-young	(yellow card) 84'
CM	15	(South Korea) Kim Cheol-ho	(yellow card) 34'
CM	6	(South Korea) Son Dae-ho
OM	8	(South Korea) Kim Do-heon
FW	10	(Brazil) Itamar		(substituted off) 86'
FW	25	(Romania) Adrian Neaga	(yellow card) 77'	(substituted off) 77'
FW	11	(Brazil) Mota
Substitutes:
GK	1	(South Korea) Kim Hae-woon
DF	4	(South Korea) Kim Tae-yoon		(substituted in) 77'
DF	23	(South Korea) Park Woo-hyun
MF	14	(South Korea) Kim Sang-sik		(substituted in) 77'
FW	12	(South Korea) Nam Ki-il
FW	22	(South Korea) Woo Sung-yong		(substituted in) 86'
Manager:
(South Korea) Kim Hak-bum

GK	1	(South Korea) Kim Byung-ji
CB	30	(Brazil) Adilson
CB	5	(South Korea) Lee Min-sung	(yellow card) 9'
CB	14	(South Korea) Kim Han-yoon	(yellow card) 84'
CM	29	(South Korea) Chun Je-hun		(substituted off) 63'
CM	77	(South Korea) Lee Eul-yong	(yellow card) 80'
RM	7	(South Korea) Choi Won-kwon	(yellow card) 14'	(substituted off) 50'
LM	23	(South Korea) Choi Jae-soo		(substituted off) 75'
OM	50	(Portugal) Ricardo Nascimento	(yellow card) 65'
FW	18	(South Korea) Kim Eun-jung
FW	8	(Brazil) Dudu
Substitutes:
GK	99	(South Korea) Park Dong-suk
DF	2	(South Korea) Kwak Tae-hwi
MF	24	(South Korea) Koh Myong-jin		(substituted in) 63'
FW	10	(South Korea) Park Chu-young		(substituted in) 50'
FW	15	(South Korea) Han Dong-won		(substituted in) 75'
FW	16	(South Korea) Kim Seung-yong
Manager:
(South Korea) Lee Jang-soo

Assistant referees:
Kim Dae-young (South Korea)
Won Chang-ho (South Korea)
Fourth official:
Kwon Jong-chul (South Korea)

=== Suwon vs Pohang ===
12 November 2006
14:00 KST

Suwon Samsung Bluewings	1–0	Pohang Steelers
Baek Ji-hoon 54'	Report

Suwon World Cup Stadium, Suwon
Attendance: 37,256
Referee: Choi Gwang-bo (South Korea)

Suwon Samsung Bluewings	Pohang Steelers

GK	31	(South Korea) Park Ho-jin
RB	23	(South Korea) Cho Won-hee
CB	2	(Croatia) Mato Neretljak
CB	4	(South Korea) Lee Jung-soo
LB	29	(South Korea) Kwak Hee-ju
CM	8	(South Korea) Song Chong-gug
CM	22	(South Korea) Lee Hyun-jin	(substituted off) 45'
RM	20	(South Korea) Baek Ji-hoon
LM	11	(South Korea) Kim Dae-eui	(substituted off) 61'
OM	13	(South Korea) Lee Kwan-woo	(substituted off) 86'
FW	27	(South Korea) Seo Dong-hyeon
Substitutes:
GK	1	(South Korea) Lee Woon-jae
DF	14	(South Korea) Moon Min-kui
DF	15	(South Korea) Lee Sa-vik	(substituted in) 61'
MF	7	(South Korea) Kim Jin-woo	(substituted in) 45'
FW	10	(Brazil) Elpídio Silva	(substituted in) 86'
FW	33	(Russia) Denis Laktionov
Manager:
(South Korea) Cha Bum-kun

GK	31	(South Korea) Jung Sung-ryong
CB	5	(South Korea) Kim Sung-keun
CB	24	(South Korea) Hwang Jae-won
CB	4	(South Korea) Cho Sung-hwan	(yellow card) 71'
DM	3	(South Korea) Lee Chang-won		(substituted off) 57'
RM	14	(South Korea) Oh Beom-seok
CM	9	(South Korea) Hwang Ji-soo
CM	6	(South Korea) Kim Gi-dong
LM	19	(South Korea) Park Won-jae
FW	8	(South Korea) Hwang Jin-sung		(substituted off) 65'
FW	22	(South Korea) Ko Ki-gu		(substituted off) 74'
Substitutes:
GK	21	(South Korea) Shin Hwa-yong
DF	15	(South Korea) Lee Jung-ho
MF	10	(Brazil) Tavares		(substituted in) 65'
MF	12	(South Korea) Oh Seung-bum
FW	20	(South Korea) Lee Dong-gook		(substituted in) 57'
FW	29	(Argentina) Carlos Esteban Frontini		(substituted in) 74'
Manager:
(Brazil) Sérgio Farias

Assistant referees:
Ahn Sang-ki (South Korea)
Kang Chang-koo (South Korea)
Fourth official:
Lee Jong-gook (South Korea)

== Final ==
=== First leg ===
19 November 2006
14:00 KST

Seongnam Ilhwa Chunma	1–0	Suwon Samsung Bluewings
Woo Sung-yong 88'	Report

Tancheon Sports Complex, Seongnam
Attendance: 21,437
Referee: Lutz Wagner (Germany)

Seongnam Ilhwa Chunma	Suwon Samsung Bluewings

GK	40	(South Korea) Kim Yong-dae
RB	2	(South Korea) Park Jin-sub
CB	20	(South Korea) Kim Young-chul
CB	5	(South Korea) Cho Byung-kuk
LB	8	(South Korea) Jang Hak-young
CM	15	(South Korea) Kim Cheol-ho
CM	6	(South Korea) Son Dae-ho	Booked
OM	8	(South Korea) Kim Do-heon		(substituted off) 80'
LW	25	(Romania) Adrian Neaga		(substituted off) 72'
RW	11	(Brazil) Mota		(substituted off) 90+1'
FW	22	(South Korea) Woo Sung-yong
Substitutes:
GK	1	(South Korea) Kim Hae-woon
DF	4	(South Korea) Kim Tae-yoon		(substituted in) 90+1'
DF	23	(South Korea) Park Woo-hyun
MF	14	(South Korea) Kim Sang-sik		(substituted in) 72'
FW	10	(Brazil) Itamar		(substituted in) 80'
FW	12	(South Korea) Nam Ki-il
Manager:
(South Korea) Kim Hak-bum

GK	31	(South Korea) Park Ho-jin
RB	4	(South Korea) Lee Jung-soo
CB	15	(South Korea) Lee Sa-vik
CB	2	(Croatia) Mato Neretljak
LB	29	(South Korea) Kwak Hee-ju
CM	8	(South Korea) Song Chong-gug
CM	5	(South Korea) Kim Nam-il	Booked
RM	13	(South Korea) Lee Kwan-woo
LM	11	(South Korea) Kim Dae-eui		(substituted off) 70'
OM	20	(South Korea) Baek Ji-hoon		(substituted off) 86'
FW	27	(South Korea) Seo Dong-hyeon		(substituted off) 45'
Substitutes:
GK	1	(South Korea) Lee Woon-jae
DF	22	(South Korea) Lee Hyun-jin		(substituted in) 86'
DF	23	(South Korea) Cho Won-hee
MF	7	(South Korea) Kim Jin-woo
FW	10	(Brazil) Elpídio Silva		(substituted in) 45'
FW	19	(South Korea) Namkung Woong		(substituted in) 70'
Manager:
(South Korea) Cha Bum-kun

Assistant referees:
Kim Kye-soo (South Korea)
Kim Jung-sik (South Korea)
Fourth official:
Yoo Byung-sub (South Korea)

=== Second leg ===
25 November 2006
14:00 KST

Suwon Samsung Bluewings	1–2	Seongnam Ilhwa Chunma
Elpídio Silva 75'	Report	Mota 25', 65'

Suwon World Cup Stadium, Suwon
Attendance: 38,526
Referee: Shamsul Maidin (Singapore)

Suwon Samsung Bluewings	Seongnam Ilhwa Chunma

GK	31	(South Korea) Park Ho-jin
RB	8	(South Korea) Song Chong-gug
CB	4	(South Korea) Lee Jung-soo
CB	2	(Croatia) Mato Neretljak	(yellow card) 6'
LB	29	(South Korea) Kwak Hee-ju	(yellow card) 46'
DM	5	(South Korea) Kim Nam-il
CM	13	(South Korea) Lee Kwan-woo
CM	20	(South Korea) Baek Ji-hoon		(substituted off) 64'
RW	3	(South Korea) Park Ju-sung		(substituted off) 45'
LW	11	(South Korea) Kim Dae-eui		(substituted off) 77'
FW	9	(Uruguay) Juan Manuel Olivera
Substitutes:
GK	1	(South Korea) Lee Woon-jae
DF	15	(South Korea) Lee Sa-vik
DF	23	(South Korea) Cho Won-hee
MF	7	(South Korea) Kim Jin-woo		(substituted in) 45'
FW	10	(Brazil) Elpídio Silva		(substituted in) 64'
FW	27	(South Korea) Seo Dong-hyeon		(substituted in) 77'
Manager:
(South Korea) Cha Bum-kun

GK	40	(South Korea) Kim Yong-dae	(yellow card) 90+3'
RB	2	(South Korea) Park Jin-sub		(substituted off) 89'
CB	20	(South Korea) Kim Young-chul
CB	5	(South Korea) Cho Byung-kuk
LB	8	(South Korea) Jang Hak-young
CM	15	(South Korea) Kim Cheol-ho	(yellow card) 63'
CM	6	(South Korea) Son Dae-ho	(yellow card) 39'
OM	8	(South Korea) Kim Do-heon		(substituted off) 71'
RW	11	(Brazil) Mota
LW	25	(Romania) Adrian Neaga
FW	10	(Brazil) Itamar		(substituted off) 71'
Substitutes:
GK	1	(South Korea) Kim Hae-woon
DF	4	(South Korea) Kim Tae-yoon		(substituted in) 89'
DF	23	(South Korea) Park Woo-hyun
MF	14	(South Korea) Kim Sang-sik		(substituted in) 71'
FW	12	(South Korea) Nam Ki-il
FW	22	(South Korea) Woo Sung-yong		(substituted in) 71'
Manager:
(South Korea) Kim Hak-bum

Assistant referees:
Won Chang-ho (South Korea)
Kang Chang-koo (South Korea)
Fourth official:
Lee Jong-gook (South Korea)

Seongnam Ilhwa Chunma won 3–1 on aggregate.

== Final table ==
Pos	Team	Qualification
1	Seongnam Ilhwa Chunma (C)	Qualification for the Champions League
2	Suwon Samsung Bluewings	
3	Pohang Steelers	
4	FC Seoul	

Source: RSSSF
(C) Champions

== See also ==
- 2006 in South Korean football
- 2006 K League
