= 2007 Korean FA Cup =

2007 Hana Bank FA Cup

Tournament details
- Country: South Korea

Final positions
- Champions: Jeonnam Dragons (3rd title)
- Runners-up: Pohang Steelers

Tournament statistics
- Top goal scorer(s): 12 players (2 goals each)

Awards
- Best player: Kim Chi-woo

The 2007 Korean FA Cup, known as the 2007 Hana Bank FA Cup, was the twelfth edition of the Korean FA Cup.

== Qualifying rounds ==
=== First round ===
March 11	University of Incheon	3–0	Bukak Club	Yongin Sports Complex
	Park Ki-seo 55', 79'; Han Ji-ho 77'

March 11	Chung-Ang University	4–1	Hanwoori	Yongin Sports Complex
	Kim Sin-wook 32'; Choi Kil-ho 33'; Kim In-ho 61'; Lee Yong 90'		Kang Dong-su 62'

March 11	Sungkyunkwan University	5–1	LG Cyon	Yongin Sports Complex
	You Dong-kyu 16'; Jo Joo-young 20'; Kim Bum-seok 52'; Nam Hyung-sung 75'; Yoon Dong-min 84'		Lim Byung-cheol 7'

March 11	University of Ulsan	Walkover	Bonghwang FC	Yongin Sports Complex

=== Second round ===
May 27	Soongsil University	1–1 (3–1 p)	University of Incheon	Paju NFC
	Ryu Hyun-ho 12'		Lee Seung-won 22' (o.g.)

May 27	Hanyang University	2–3	Chung-Ang University	Paju NFC
	Jung Il-hwan 22'; Song Ho-young 87'		Jung Hee-bong 4'; Choi Kil-ho 14'; Oh Hyung-seok 28'

May 27	Konkuk University	2–0	Sungkyunkwan University	Paju NFC
	Kang Jung-hoon 23'; Cho Dong-geon 47'

May 27	Korea University	1–1 (2–4 p)	University of Ulsan	Paju NFC
	Lee Jae-min 23'		An Young-sin 37'

== Final rounds ==
=== Bracket ===
Round of 16
Hyundai Mipo Dockyard (p)	2 (4)
Gyeongnam FC	2 (2)
Goyang KB Kookmin Bank	2 (2)
Pohang Steelers (p)	2 (4)
Jeju United (p)	1 (5)
Seongnam Ilhwa Chunma	1 (4)
Daejeon Citizen	0
Busan IPark	2
Jeonnam Dragons	1
Jeonbuk Hyundai Motors	0
Gwangju Sangmu	1
Ulsan Hyundai Horang-i	3
Daegu FC	2
Incheon United	3
FC Seoul (p)	0 (4)
Suwon Samsung Bluewings	0 (2)

Quarter-finals
Hyundai Mipo Dockyard	0
Pohang Steelers	2
Jeju United (p)	0 (5)
Busan IPark	0 (4)
Jeonnam Dragons (p)	0 (4)
Ulsan Hyundai Horang-i	0 (2)
Incheon United	2
FC Seoul	1

Semi-finals
Pohang Steelers	2
Jeju United	1
Jeonnam Dragons	2
Incheon United	0

Final
Pohang Steelers	2	1	3
Jeonnam Dragons	3	3	6

=== Third round ===
Jeonnam Dragons, Seongnam Ilhwa Chunma and Jeonbuk Hyundai Motors won by default.

June 12	Goyang KB Kookmin Bank	0–0 (5–4 p)	Suwon City	Goyang Stadium

June 12	Daejeon Citizen	2–0	Chung-Ang University	Daejeon World Cup Stadium
	Denilson 22', 59'

June 12	Incheon Korail	1–1 (3–5 p)	FC Seoul	Incheon Sungui Stadium
	Kim Min-soo 49'		Kim Eun-jung 74'

June 12	Busan Transportation Corporation	0–1	Ulsan Hyundai Horang-i	Goodeok Stadium
			Park Jun-hong 90' (o.g.)

June 12	Changwon City	0–2	Gyeongnam FC	Changwon Civil Stadium
			Kim Hyo-il 28'; Cabore 30'

June 12	Gangneung City	1–1 (6–7 p)	Daegu FC	Gangneung Stadium
	Na Il-kyun 91'		Eninho 43'

June 12	Gwangju Sangmu	2–1	University of Incheon	Bucheon Stadium
	Song Keun-soo 26'; Choi Sung-hyun 63'		Jo Kyung-ho 90'

June 12	Icheon Hummel Korea	1–3	Busan IPark	Icheon City Stadium
	Kang Hyun-wook 56'		Valente 17'; Ahn Seong-min 29'; Park Kyu-seon 83'

June 12	Jeju United	2–0	University of Ulsan	Jeju World Cup Stadium
	Cho Jin-soo 2'; Choi Hyun-youn 70'

June 12	Pohang Steelers	4–1	Konkuk University	Steelyard Stadium
	Choi Tae-uk 16', 83'; Lee Gwang-jae 54'; Kim Gwang-seok 55'		Jung Jeong-hyun 79'

June 12	Seosan Omega	1–4	Suwon Samsung Bluewings	Seosan City Stadium
	Shin Hyun-joon 7'		Kim Dae-eui 20'; Neretljak 25'; Edu 48'; Seo Dong-hyun 58'

June 12	Daejeon KHNP	0–4	Incheon United	Daejeon World Cup Stadium Auxiliary Stadium
			Bang Seung-hwan 17', 90'; Kim Sang-rok 83'; No Jong-gun 89'

June 12	Ansan Hallelujah	0–1	Hyundai Mipo Dockyard	Ansan Wa~ Stadium
			Lee Hyun 68'

=== Round of 16 ===
August 1	FC Seoul	0–0 (4–2 p)	Suwon Samsung Bluewings	Seoul World Cup Stadium

August 1	Daejeon Citizen	0–2	Busan IPark	Daejeon World Cup Stadium
			Sim Jae-won 20', 25'

August 1	Hyundai Mipo Dockyard	2–2 (4–2 p)	Gyeongnam FC	Ulsan Complex Stadium
	Kim Won-jae 42'; Ahn Sung-nam 55'		Lee Sang-hong 18'; Kim Sung-kil 59'

August 1	Jeonnam Dragons	1–0	Jeonbuk Hyundai Motors	Gwangyang Football Stadium
	Kim Tae-su 57'

August 1	Goyang KB Kookmin Bank	2–2 (2–4 p)	Pohang Steelers	Goyang Stadium
	Ryu Byung-hoon 45'; Yoon Bo-young 85'		Lee Chang-won 60'; Hwang Jae-won 70'

August 1	Daegu FC	2–3	Incheon United	Daegu World Cup Stadium
	Luizinho 20'; Eninho 87'		Kim Sang-rok 50'; Mladenović 52'; Park Jae-hyun 71'

August 1	Gwangju Sangmu	1–3	Ulsan Hyundai Horang-i	Gwangju World Cup Stadium
	Namgung Do 49'		Oh Jang-eun 26'; Woo Sung-yong 60'; Almir 82'

August 1	Jeju United	1–1 (5–4 p)	Seongnam Ilhwa Chunma	Jeju World Cup Stadium
	Chun Jae-woon 27'		Kim Min-ho 11'

=== Quarter-finals ===
September 18	Jeonnam Dragons	0–0 (4–2 p)	Ulsan Hyundai Horang-i	Gwangyang Football Stadium

September 18	Hyundai Mipo Dockyard	0–2	Pohang Steelers	Ulsan Complex Stadium
			Hwang Jae-won 31'; Lee Gwang-jae 64'

September 18	Incheon United	2–1	FC Seoul	Incheon World Cup Stadium
	Damjanović 10'; Park Jae-hyun 74'		Kim Chi-gon 90+1'

September 19	Jeju United	0–0 (5–4 p)	Busan IPark	Kang Chang-hak Stadium

=== Semi-finals ===
October 3	Jeonnam Dragons	2–0	Incheon United	Gwangyang Football Stadium
	Sandro Hiroshi 3'; Kim Chi-woo 88'

October 3	Pohang Steelers	2–1	Jeju United	Steelyard Stadium
	Tavares 10'; Jonhes 57'		Cho Jin-soo 87'

=== Final ===
November 25 First leg	Jeonnam Dragons	3–2	Pohang Steelers	Gwangyang Football Stadium, Gwangyang
	Kim Chi-woo 21'; Kim Seung-hyun 81'; Kwak Tae-hwi 86'		Tavares 24' (pen.); Kim Gwang-seok 50'

December 2 Second leg	Pohang Steelers	1–3 (3–6 agg.)	Jeonnam Dragons	Pohang Steel Yard, Pohang
	Hwang Jin-sung 48'		Song Jung-hyun 35', 80'; Hiroshi 83'

Jeonnam Dragons won 6–3 on aggregate.

== Awards ==
Award	Winner	Team
Most Valuable Player	(South Korea) Kim Chi-woo	Jeonnam Dragons
Top goalscorer	Not awarded	
Best Manager	(South Korea) Huh Jung-moo	Jeonnam Dragons

== See also ==
- 2007 in South Korean football
- 2007 K League
- 2007 Korea National League
- 2007 K3 League
- 2007 Korean League Cup
