= Seo Deok-kyu =

South Korean footballer

Seo Deok-Kyu 서덕규
Personal information
- Full name: Seo Deok-Kyu
- Date of birth: October 22, 1978 (age 48)
- Place of birth: Seoul, South Korea
- Height: 1.81 m (5 ft 11 in)
- Position: Defender

Youth career
- 1997–2000: Soongsil University

Senior career*
Years	Team	Apps	(Gls)
2001–2008	Ulsan Hyundai Horang-i	77	(0)
2004–2005	→ Gwangju Sangmu Bulsajo (army)	36	(0)

International career^{‡}
2001	South Korea	1	(0)
- * Club domestic league appearances and goals as of 3 March 2009 ‡ National team caps and goals as of 10 October 2008

Seo Deok-Kyu (Korean: 서덕규, October 22, 1978) is a South Korean football player.

Seo was a part of South Korea who of the 2001 Confederations Cup.

== Club career statistics ==
Club performance			League		Cup		League Cup		Continental		Total	
Season	Club	League	Apps	Goals	Apps	Goals	Apps	Goals	Apps	Goals	Apps	Goals
South Korea			League		KFA Cup		League Cup		Asia		Total	
2001	Ulsan Hyundai Horang-i	K-League	24	0	?	?	8	0	-			
2002	Ulsan Hyundai Horang-i	K-League	22	0	?	?	7	0	-			
2003	Ulsan Hyundai Horang-i	K-League	8	0	0	0	-		-		8	0
2004	Gwangju Sangmu Phoenix	K-League	22	0	3	0	10	0	-		35	0
2005	Gwangju Sangmu Phoenix	K-League	14	0	0	0	2	0	-		16	0
2006	Ulsan Hyundai Horang-i	K-League	6	0	0	0	5	0	?	?		
2007	Ulsan Hyundai Horang-i	K-League	12	0	1	0	6	0	-		19	0
2008	Ulsan Hyundai Horang-i	K-League	5	0	2	0	2	0	-		9	0
Total	South Korea		113	0			40	0				
Career total			113	0			40	0				
