= Kim Min-ho (footballer, born 1985) =

South Korean footballer

Personal information
- Date of birth: 13 May 1985 (age 41)
- Place of birth: South Korea
- Height: 1.89 m (6 ft 2 1/2 in)
- Position: Midfielder

Youth career
- 2003–2006: Konkuk University

Senior career*
Years	Team	Apps	(Gls)
2007–2007	Seongnam Ilhwa Chunma	7	(0)
2008–2010	Chunnam Dragons	16	(2)
2010	Daegu FC	2	(0)
- * Club domestic league appearances and goals as of 27 September 2010

Kim Min-ho (born 13 May 1985) is a South Korean football player.

== Club career ==
Kim was a draftee from Konkuk University, joining Seongnam Ilhwa for the 2007 season, making a number of intermittent appearances throughout the season. He then moved to the Chunnam Dragons but again only made intermittent appearances in a two and a half year spell for his new club. In the summer of 2010, Kim transferred to Daegu FC, playing his first game for his new club as a substitute in a 3–1 loss to Suwon Samsung Bluewings.

== Club career statistics ==
As of 27 September 2010

Club performance			League		Cup		League Cup		Total	
Season	Club	League	Apps	Goals	Apps	Goals	Apps	Goals	Apps	Goals
South Korea			League		KFA Cup		League Cup		Total	
2010	Daegu FC	K-League	2	0	0	0	0	0	2	0
Career total			2	0	0	0	0	0	2	0
