= Choi Hyo-jin =

South Korean footballer (born 1983)

Choi Hyo-Jin 최효진
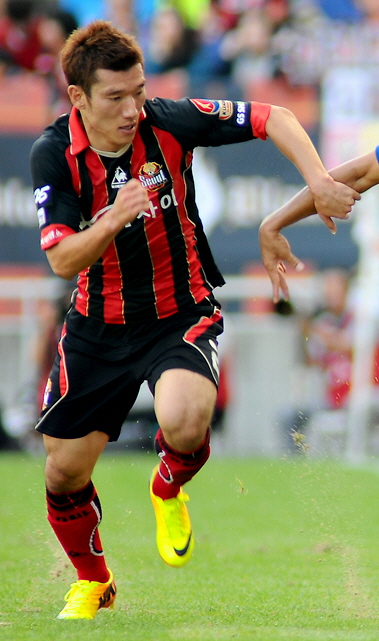
- Choi with FC Seoul in 2013

Personal information
- Full name: Choi Hyo-Jin
- Date of birth: 18 August 1983 (age 43)
- Place of birth: South Korea
- Height: 1.72 m (5 ft 8 in)
- Position: Right wing back

Youth career
- 2002–2004: Ajou University

Senior career*
Years	Team	Apps	(Gls)
2005–2006	Incheon United	48	(5)
2007–2009	Pohang Steelers	65	(5)
2010–2014	FC Seoul	71	(2)
2011–2012	→ Sangju Sangmu (military service)	48	(2)
2015–2021	Jeonnam Dragons	137	(6)

International career^{‡}
2008–2012	South Korea	18	(1)
- * Club domestic league appearances and goals as of 27 January 2022 ‡ National team caps and goals as of 31 May 2013

- Choi Hyo-jin
- Hangul: 최효진
- Hanja: 崔孝鎭
- RR: Choe Hyojin
- MR: Ch'oe Hyojin

Choi Hyo-Jin (Korean: 최효진, born 18 August 1983) is a South Korean retired football player who used to play as a right wingback.

== Career statistics ==
=== Club ===
As of 27 January 2022

Club performance			League		Cup		League Cup		Continental		Total	
Season	Club	League	Apps	Goals	Apps	Goals	Apps	Goals	Apps	Goals	Apps	Goals
South Korea			League		KFA Cup		League Cup		Asia		Total	
2005	Incheon United	K League 1	34	1	1	0	10	0	-		35	1
2006	Incheon United	K League 1	36	4	3	2	12	0	-		39	6
2007	Pohang Steelers	K League 1	26	3	4	0	8	2	-		30	3
2008	Pohang Steelers	K League 1	26	2	4	0	1	0	4	1	34	3
2009	Pohang Steelers	K League 1	27	2	1	0	5	0	15	3	43	5
2010	FC Seoul	K League 1	34	3	2	1	6	1	-		36	4
2011	Sangju Sangmu Phoenix	K League 1	30	2	2	0	5	0	-		32	2
2012	Sangju Sangmu Phoenix	K League 1	23	0	0	0	0	0	-		23	0
2012	FC Seoul	K League 1	6	0	0	0	0	0	0	0	6	0
2013	FC Seoul	K League 1	24	0	0	0	0	0	0	0	24	0
2014	FC Seoul	K League 1	13	0	0	0	0	0	0	0	13	0
2015	Jeonnam Dragons	K League 1	27	2	0	0	0	0	0	0	27	2
2016	Jeonnam Dragons	K League 1	31	2	0	0	0	0	0	0	31	2
2017	Jeonnam Dragons	K League 1	22	1	0	0	0	0	0	0	22	1
2018	Jeonnam Dragons	K League 1	12	0	0	0	0	0	0	0	12	0
2019	Jeonnam Dragons	K League 2	28	1	0	0	0	0	0	0	28	1
2020	Jeonnam Dragons	K League 2	14	0	0	0	0	0	0	0	14	0
2021	Jeonnam Dragons	K League 2	3	0	0	0	0	0	0	0	3	0
Career total			416	23	17	3	47	3	19	4	499	33

=== International ===
Appearances and goals by national team and year
National team	Year	Apps	Goals
South Korea	2008	3	0
South Korea	2009	2	0
South Korea	2010	4	1
South Korea	2011	5	0
South Korea	2012	4	0
Total		18	1

Scores and results list South Korea's goal tally first, score column indicates score after each Choi goal.

List of international goals scored by Choi Hyo-jin
No.	Date	Venue	Opponent	Score	Result	Competition
1	11 August 2010	Suwon World Cup Stadium, Suwon, South Korea	Nigeria	2–1	2–1	Friendly

== Honors ==
=== Club ===
Incheon United

- K League 1 Runner-up : 2005

Pohang Steelers

- K League 1 Winner : 2007
- Korean FA Cup
  - Winner : 2008
  - Runner-up : 2007
- League Cup Winner : 2009
- AFC Champions League Winner : 2009

FC Seoul

- K League 1
  - Winners (2): 2010, 2012
- League Cup
  - Winners (1): 2010
- AFC Champions League
  - Runner-up : 2013
- Korean FA Cup
  - Runner-up : 2014

=== Individual ===
- Korean FA Cup MVP : 2008
- K-League Best XI : 2008, 2009, 2010
