= Kim Hak-bum =

South Korean football manager (born 1960)

Personal information
- Date of birth: 1 March 1960 (age 66)
- Place of birth: Gangneung, South Korea
- Height: 1.74 m (5 ft 9 in)
- Position: Defender

College career
Years	Team	Apps	(Gls)
1980–1983	Myongji University		

Senior career*
Years	Team	Apps	(Gls)
1983–1992	Kookmin Bank	13	(1)

Managerial career
- 2005–2008: Seongnam Ilhwa Chunma
- 2010–2011: Henan Jianye
- 2012–2013: Gangwon FC
- 2014–2016: Seongnam FC
- 2017: Gwangju FC
- 2018–2021: South Korea U23
- 2023–2025: Jeju SK
Medal record
Men's football
Representing South Korea (as manager)
Asian Games
Gold medal – first place	2018 Jakarta-Palembang
AFC U-23 Championship
Winner	2020 Thailand
- * Club domestic league appearances and goals

- Kim Hak-bum
- Hangul: 김학범
- Hanja: 金鶴範
- RR: Gim Hakbeom
- MR: Kim Hakpŏm

Kim Hak-bum (Korean: 김학범; born 1 March 1960) is a South Korean football manager.

== Club career ==
While playing for Myongji University as a defender, Kim simultaneously joined K League club Kookmin Bank in 1983. Kim played 13 matches at the 1984 K League, and participated in the Korean National Semipro League after Kookmin Bank withdrew from the K League in 1985.

== Coaching career ==
Kim retired as a player in 1992, and came back to the bank's football team as a coach after working as a bank clerk for a year. He received the best coach award at the Korean National Championship after helping the club win the tournament in his first year as a coach. He was also appointed a coach of the South Korea national under-23 team in 1995, helping them prepare for the 1996 Summer Olympics. However, he had to return to the post as a bank clerk after the bank's football team was dissolved due to the 1997 Asian financial crisis.

In September 1998, Kim left Kookmin Bank, joining K League club Cheonan Ilhwa Chunma (renamed Seongnam Ilhwa Chunma in 2000) as assistant coach to manager Cha Kyung-bok. He contributed to Seongnam's three consecutive league titles between 2001 and 2003.

== Managerial career ==
=== Seongnam Ilhwa Chunma ===
After manager Cha resigned from the club in December 2004, Kim succeeded him. In 2006, he led Seongnam to their seventh K League title, and won the K League Manager of the Year Award. He also finished first in the regular season in 2007, but lost at the play-off finals. He was nominated for the AFC Coach of the Year award for advancing to the AFC Champions League semi-finals that year. He left the club at the end of the 2008 season.

=== Henan Jianye ===
In November 2010, Kim was appointed manager of Chinese Super League side Henan Jianye. He tried to improve players' stamina and possessive capability, and thought he was leading his team to a good direction. On the other hand, he failed to win a match in eight matches, and was sacked by the president of club's company.

In July 2012, Kim was appointed manager of Gangwon FC. He was sacked the next year due to his poor results.

=== Return to Seongnam ===
In September 2014, Kim returned to Seongnam FC (Seongnam Ilhwa Chunma until 2013). He won the 2014 Korean FA Cup and was named the best manager of the tournament. On 15 August 2015, he achieved his 100th victory at the K League. In contrast with two previous seasons, he had difficulty in bringing results during the 2016 season, and was finally sacked in the middle of the season.

In August 2017, Kim signed with Gwangju FC. He did not prevent Gwangju from being relegated to the K League 2. Gwangju wanted to keep the contract with him, but he requested his resignation.

=== South Korea U23 ===
On 28 February 2018, Kim was selected as the manager of the South Korea under-23s. At the 2018 Asian Games, he suffered a shocking defeat to Malaysia in the group stage, but won a gold medal. He also won the 2020 AFC U-23 Championship, qualifying for the 2020 Summer Olympics. Prior to the Olympics, however, he tried to interfere in the senior national team to call up senior team players for friendlies, conducted tough physical training, and called up only one striker for the competition. The unbalanced selection and excessive training were followed by players' lack of stamina and quarter-final defeat to Mexico. He was nominated for the manager of the senior national team after the 2022 FIFA World Cup, but encountered opposition due to his attempt to exceed his authority and failure at the Olympics.

In December 2023, he started to manage Jeju United. In September 2025, he voluntarily resigned from the team.

== Managerial statistics ==
As of match played 22 February 2025

Managerial record by team and tenure
Team	From	To	Record					Ref.
Team	From	To	Pld	W	D	L	Win %	Ref.
Seongnam Ilhwa Chunma	7 December 2004	27 November 2008	163	83	39	41	50.92	
Henan Jianye	12 November 2010	23 May 2011	4	0	2	2	0.00	
Gangwon FC	6 July 2012	10 August 2013	48	12	14	22	25.00	
Seongnam FC	5 September 2014	12 September 2016	93	39	28	26	41.94	
Gwangju FC	14 August 2017	18 November 2017	13	2	5	6	15.38	
South Korea U23	1 March 2018	15 September 2021	26	16	5	5	61.54	
Jeju SK	5 December 2023	Present	45	19	5	21	42.22	
Career total			392	171	98	123	43.62	

== Honours ==
=== Player ===
Kookmin Bank

- Korean National Semipro League (Autumn): 1987
- Korean President's Cup: 1983, 1986, 1990

=== Manager ===
Seongnam Ilhwa Chunma

- K League 1: 2006
- Korean FA Cup: 2014
- Korean League Cup runner-up: 2006

South Korea U23

- Asian Games: 2018
- AFC U-23 Championship: 2020

Individual

- K League 1 Manager of the Year: 2006
- Korean FA Cup Best Manager: 2014
- Korean FA Coach of the Year: 2018
