= Shin Hwa-yong =

South Korean footballer (born 1983)

Shin Hwa-Yong
Personal information
- Full name: Shin Hwa-Yong
- Date of birth: 13 April 1983 (age 43)
- Place of birth: Pohang, South Korea
- Height: 1.83 m (6 ft 0 in)
- Position: Goalkeeper

Youth career
- 2000–2003: Cheongju University

Senior career*
Years	Team	Apps	(Gls)
2004–2016	Pohang Steelers	260	(0)
2017–2018	Suwon Samsung Bluewings	50	(0)
Total		310	(0)
- * Club domestic league appearances and goals as of 12:14, 4 January 2018 (UTC)

Shin Hwa-Yong (Korean: 신화용; Hanja: 申和容; born 13 April 1983) is a South Korean footballer who plays as a goalkeeper. He previously played for Pohang Steelers and Suwon Samsung Bluewings from 2004 to 2018.

== Honours ==
=== Club ===
Pohang Steelers

- K League 1: 2007, 2013
- K League 1 runner-up: 2004
- KFA Cup: 2008
- 2012 : 2012
- 2013 : 2013
- KFA Cup runner-up: 2007
- K-League Cup: 2009
- AFC Champions League: 2009

=== Individual ===
- K-League Best XI: 2009

== Club career statistics ==
As of 27 November 2011

Club performance			League		Cup		League Cup		Continental		Total	
Season	Club	League	Apps	Goals	Apps	Goals	Apps	Goals	Apps	Goals	Apps	Goals
South Korea			League		KFA Cup		League Cup		Asia		Total	
2004	Pohang Steelers	K League 1	0	0	1	0	0	0	-		1	0
2005	Pohang Steelers	K League 1	0	0	0	0	0	0	-		0	0
2006	Pohang Steelers	K League 1	12	0	1	0	1	0	-		14	0
2007	Pohang Steelers	K League 1	18	0	3	0	8	0	-		29	0
2008	Pohang Steelers	K League 1	8	0	1	0	1	0	6	0	16	0
2009	Pohang Steelers	K League 1	21	0	1	0	5	0	14	0	41	0
2010	Pohang Steelers	K League 1	23	0	4	0	5	0	9	0	41	0
2011	Pohang Steelers	K League 1	24	0	2	0	5	0	-		31	0
Career total			106	0	13	0	25	0	29	0	173	0
