= Kim Dae-keon =

South Korean footballer (born 1977)

Kim Dae-Keon
Personal information
- Date of birth: April 27, 1977 (age 49)
- Place of birth: South Korea
- Height: 1.83 m (6 ft 0 in)
- Position: Defender

Senior career*
Years	Team	Apps	(Gls)
2001	Bucheon SK	0	(0)
2002–2005	Jeonbuk Hyundai Motors	12	(1)
2003–2004	→ Gwangju Sangmu (military service)	52	(0)
2006–2008	Gyeongnam FC	57	(1)
2009	Suwon Samsung Bluewings	1	(0)
2010	Busan I'Park	7	(0)
- * Club domestic league appearances and goals as of 19 January 2010

Kim Dae-Keon (Korean: 김대건; born April 27, 1977) is a South Korean football player who currently plays for Chunnam Dragons. (formerly Gyeongnam FC, Jeonbuk Hyundai Motors, Bucheon SK Gwangju Sangmu Bulsajo, and Suwon Samsung Bluewings).
