= Lee Kwang-suk =

South Korean footballer (born 1975)

Personal information
- Date of birth: March 5, 1975 (age 51)
- Place of birth: South Korea
- Height: 1.84 m (6 ft 0 in)
- Position: Goalkeeper

Senior career*
Years	Team	Apps	(Gls)
1998–2006	Jeonbuk Hyundai Motors	113	(0)
2002–2003	→ Gwangju Sangmu Bulsajo (army)	33	(0)
2007–2009	Gyeongnam FC	41	(0)
2010–2011	Yongin City FC	41	(0)
2012	Gimhae City FC	8	(0)
2015	Jeonnam Dragons	0	(0)

Managerial career
- 2010–2011: Yongin City FC (player-coach)
- 2012: Gimhae City FC (player-coach)
- 2013–: Jeonnam Dragons (player and goalkeeping coach)
- * Club domestic league appearances and goals

Lee Kwang-suk (born March 5, 1975) is a South Korean retired footballer who played as a goalkeeper.
