= Lee Chang-won =

South Korean footballer

Lee Chang-Won
Personal information
- Date of birth: 10 July 1975 (age 51)
- Place of birth: South Korea
- Height: 1.83 m (6 ft 0 in)
- Position: Defender

Team information
- Current team: South Korea U20 (manager)

Youth career
- Yeungnam University

Senior career*
| Years | Team | Apps | (Gls) |
| 2001–2005 | Chunnam Dragons | 62 | (0) |
| 2006–2009 | Pohang Steelers | 41 | (0) |
- * Club domestic league appearances and goals as of 1 November 2009

Lee Chang-Won (Korean: 이창원; born 10 July 1975) is a South Korean football manager and former football player, he is the currently manager of South Korea U20.

== Honors ==
=== Club ===
Chunnam Dragons

- KFA Cup Runner-up : 2003

Pohang Steelers

- K-League Winner : 2007
- KFA Cup
  - Winner : 2008
  - Runner-up : 2007
- K-League Cup Winner : 2009
- AFC Champions League Winner : 2009

== Club career statistics ==
As of 19 December 2009

| Club performance | | | League | | Cup | | League Cup | | Continental | | Total | |
| Season | Club | League | Apps | Goals | Apps | Goals | Apps | Goals | Apps | Goals | Apps | Goals |
| South Korea | | | League | | KFA Cup | | League Cup | | Asia | | Total | |
|---|---|---|---|---|---|---|---|---|---|---|---|---|
| 2001 | Chunnam Dragons | K-League | 14 | 0 | ? | ? | 1 | 0 | - | | 15 | 0 |
| 2002 | Chunnam Dragons | K-League | 6 | 0 | ? | ? | 5 | 0 | - | | 11 | 0 |
| 2003 | Chunnam Dragons | K-League | 8 | 0 | 0 | 0 | - | | - | | 8 | 0 |
| 2004 | Chunnam Dragons | K-League | 18 | 0 | 2 | 0 | 11 | 0 | - | | 31 | 0 |
| 2005 | Chunnam Dragons | K-League | 16 | 0 | 2 | 0 | 10 | 1 | - | | 28 | 1 |
| 2006 | Pohang Steelers | K-League | 17 | 0 | 2 | 0 | 10 | 0 | - | | 29 | 0 |
| 2007 | Pohang Steelers | K-League | 19 | 0 | 3 | 1 | 3 | 0 | - | | 25 | 1 |
| 2008 | Pohang Steelers | K-League | 5 | 0 | 0 | 0 | 0 | 0 | 4 | 0 | 9 | 0 |
| 2009 | Pohang Steelers | K-League | 0 | 0 | 1 | 0 | 0 | 0 | 0 | 0 | 1 | 0 |
| Career total | | | 103 | 0 | 10 | 1 | 40 | 1 | 4 | 0 | 157 | 2 |
