= Kim Jong-hoon (footballer) =

South Korean footballer (born 1980)

Kim Jong-Hoon
Personal information
- Full name: Kim Jong-Hoon (김종훈)
- Date of birth: December 17, 1980 (age 45)
- Place of birth: South Korea
- Height: 1.86 m (6 ft 1 in)
- Position: Centre back

Senior career*
Years	Team	Apps	(Gls)
2003–2005	Chunnam Dragons		
2006	Busan Kyotong	19	(0)
2007–2009	Gyeongnam FC	35	(1)
2010	Busan I'Park	7	(0)
2011	Gimhae City	20	(0)
- * Club domestic league appearances and goals

Kim Jong-Hoon (born December 17, 1980) is a South Korean football player. He formerly played for Chunnam Dragons, Gyeongnam FC, Busan I'Park in the K-League and South Korea second division side Gimhae City FC.

== Career ==
- Chunnam Dragons 2003-2005
- Busan Transportation Corporation FC 2006
- Gyeongnam FC 2007–2009
- Busan I'Park 2010
- Gimhae City FC 2011
