= Oh Seung-bum =

South Korean footballer (born 1981)

Personal information
- Full name: Oh Seung-bum
- Date of birth: 26 February 1981 (age 45)
- Place of birth: Jeju, South Korea
- Height: 1.74 m (5 ft 9 in)
- Position: Defensive midfielder

Youth career
- Ohyeon High School

Senior career*
| Years | Team | Apps | (Gls) |
| 1999–2004 | Seongnam Ilhwa | 12 | (0) |
| 2002–2003 | → Gwangju Sangmu (loan) | 40 | (2) |
| 2005–2007 | Pohang Steelers | 65 | (5) |
| 2008–2014 | Jeju United | 178 | (3) |
| 2015 | Chungju Hummel | 37 | (3) |
| 2016–2017 | Gangwon FC | 56 | (1) |

International career
| 2003–2004 | South Korea U-23 | 15 | (0) |
- * Club domestic league appearances and goals as of 1 January 2018

- Oh Seung-bum
- Hangul: 오승범
- Hanja: 吳承範
- RR: O Seungbeom
- MR: O Sŭngbŏm

Oh Seung-bum (Korean: 오승범; born 26 February 1981) is a former South Korean footballer, who played as midfielder for Gangwon FC in K League 1.

His previous clubs include Seongnam Ilhwa, Gwangju Sangmu (military service), Pohang Steelers, Jeju United and Chungju Hummel.

== Career ==
His career started at Seongnam Ilhwa in 1999, he spent five years with the Seongnam Ilhwa. In the meanwhile, he moved to Gwangju Sangmu to fulfill his compulsory military duties, where he stayed until 2003 season. In 2005, he moved to Pohang Steelers. Two years later he moved to hometown team Jeju United. At January 2015, he signed to Chungju Hummel.
