= Andrezinho (footballer, born 1983) =

Brazilian footballer

Personal information
- Full name: André Luiz Tavares
- Date of birth: 30 July 1983 (age 43)
- Place of birth: Campinas, São Paulo, Brazil
- Height: 1.78 m (5 ft 10 in)
- Position: Attacking midfielder

Youth career
- Flamengo

Senior career*
Years	Team	Apps	(Gls)
2001–2004	Flamengo	72	(8)
2004–2007	Pohang Steelers	78	(18)
2008–2009	Nova Iguaçu	0	(0)
2008–2009	→ Internacional (loan)	88	(16)
2010–2011	Internacional	81	(10)
2012–2013	Botafogo	53	(9)
2013–2015	Tianjin TEDA	57	(11)
2015–2017	Vasco da Gama	79	(7)
2017	→ Goiás (loan)	21	(1)
2018–2019	Nova Iguaçu	8	(0)
Total		537	(80)

International career
1999	Brazil U17		
2003	Brazil U20	6	(0)
2003	Brazil U23	4	(1)
Medal record
Men's football
Representing Brazil
FIFA World Youth Championship
Winner	2003 United Arab Emirates
FIFA U-17 World Championship
Winner	1999 New Zealand
South American U-20 Championship
Winner	2001 Ecuador
- * Club domestic league appearances and goals

André Luiz Tavares (born 30 July 1983), commonly known as Andrezinho, is a Brazilian former professional footballer. Mainly an attacking midfielder, he was also capable of playing as a wide midfielder or central midfielder. He represented Brazil at between under-17 and under-23 level, and was one of champions at the 1999 FIFA U-17 World Championship and the 2003 FIFA World Youth Championship. While playing as a professional player, he won one Copa Libertadores, one Copa Sudamericana, and six state leagues, as well as one K League in South Korea, at which he was selected as the Most Valuable Player.

== Career statistics ==
Appearances and goals by club, season and competition
Club	Season	League			State league		National cup		League cup		Continental		Other		Total	
Club	Season	Division	Apps	Goals	Apps	Goals	Apps	Goals	Apps	Goals	Apps	Goals	Apps	Goals	Apps	Goals
Flamengo	2001	Série A	4	0	1 (Note: Appearances in Campeonato Carioca)	0	0	0	—		—		1 (Note: Appearance in Copa Mercosur)	0	6	0
Flamengo	2002	Série A	15	1	17	5	0	0	—		6 (Note: Appearances in Copa Libertadores)	0	19 (Note: Fourteen appearances and four goals in Torneio Rio–São Paulo, five appearances and one goal in Copa dos Campeões)	5	57	11
Flamengo	2003	Série A	22	2	7	0	6	1	—		2 (Note: Appearances in Copa Sudamericana)	0	—		37	3
Flamengo	2004	Série A	—		6	0	2	1	—		—		—		8	1
Flamengo	Total		41	3	31	5	8	2	—		8	0	20	5	108	15
Pohang Steelers	2004	K League	20	5	—		0	0	11	0	—		3 (Note: Appearances in K League Championship)	1	34	6
Pohang Steelers	2005	K League	16	5	—		2	0	3	0	—		—		21	5
Pohang Steelers	2006	K League	19	6	—		1	0	5	0	—		1	0	26	6
Pohang Steelers	2007	K League	23	2	—		6	2	7	1	—		5	0	41	5
Pohang Steelers	Total		78	18	—		9	2	26	1	—		9	1	122	22
Internacional (loan)	2008	Série A	23	2	14 (Note: Appearances in Campeonato Gaúcho)	0	4	2	—		7	0	—		48	4
Internacional (loan)	2009	Série A	33	6	18	8	6	2	—		2	0	3 (Note: Two appearances in Recopa Sudamericana, one appearance and one goal in Suruga Bank Championship)	1	62	17
Internacional (loan)	Total		56	8	32	8	10	4	—		9	0	3	1	110	21
Internacional	2010	Série A	32	5	13	0	0	0	—		10	1	1 (Note: Appearance in FIFA Club World Cup)	0	56	6
Internacional	2011	Série A	24	2	12	3	0	0	—		7	0	2 (Note: Appearances in Recopa Sudamericana)	0	45	5
Internacional	Total		56	7	25	3	0	0	—		17	1	3	0	101	11
Botafogo	2012	Série A	32	8	12	0	3	0	—		2	0	—		49	8
Botafogo	2013	Série A	3	0	6	1	2	1	—		—		—		11	2
Botafogo	Total		35	8	18	1	5	1	—		2	0	—		60	10
Tianjin TEDA	2013	Chinese Super League	14	1	—		—		—		—		—		14	1
Tianjin TEDA	2014	Chinese Super League	28	7	—		1	0	—		—		—		29	7
Tianjin TEDA	2015	Chinese Super League	15	3	—		0	0	—		—		—		15	3
Tianjin TEDA	Total		57	11	—		1	0	—		—		—		58	11
Vasco da Gama	2015	Série A	21	1	—		1	0	—		—		—		22	1
Vasco da Gama	2016	Série B	32	4	16	2	7	1	—		—		—		55	7
Vasco da Gama	2017	Série A	2	0	8	0	1	0	—		—		—		11	0
Vasco da Gama	Total		55	5	24	2	9	1	—		—		—		88	8
Goiás (loan)	2017	Série B	21	1	—		—		—		—		—		21	1
Nova Iguaçu	2018	Série D	—		2	0	—		—		—		2 (Note: Appearances in Copa Rio)	0	4	0
Nova Iguaçu	2019	—			6	0	—		—		—		—		6	0
Nova Iguaçu	Total		—		8	0	—		—		—		2	0	10	0
Career total			399	61	138	19	42	10	26	1	36	1	37	7	678	99

== Honours ==
Flamengo

- Campeonato Carioca: 2001
- Copa dos Campeões: 2001
- Copa do Brasil runner-up: 2003
- Copa Mercosur runner-up: 2001

Pohang Steelers

- K League 1: 2007
- Korean FA Cup runner-up: 2007

Internacional

- Campeonato Gaúcho: 2008, 2009, 2011
- Copa Libertadores: 2010
- Copa Sudamericana: 2008
- Recopa Sudamericana: 2011
- Suruga Bank Championship: 2009
- Copa do Brasil runner-up: 2009

Botafogo

- Campeonato Carioca: 2013

Vasco da Gama

- Campeonato Carioca: 2016

Brazil U17

- FIFA U-17 World Championship: 1999

Brazil U20

- FIFA World Youth Championship: 2003
- South American U-20 Championship: 2001

Individual

- Korean League Cup top assist provider: 2004
- K League 1 Best XI: 2004, 2007
- K League All-Star: 2006
- K League 1 Most Valuable Player: 2007
- K League 1 top assist provider: 2007
- Campeonato Carioca Team of the Year: 2016
