= Kim Gi-dong =

South Korean footballer (born 1972)

Kim Gi-Dong
- Kim in 2026

Personal information
- Date of birth: 12 January 1972 (age 54)
- Place of birth: Dangjin, Chungnam, South Korea
- Height: 1.71 m (5 ft 7 in)
- Position: Midfielder

Team information
- Current team: FC Seoul (manager)

Senior career*
Years	Team	Apps	(Gls)
1991–1992	POSCO Atoms	0	(0)
1993–2002	Yukong Elephants / Bucheon SK	198	(8)
2003–2011	Pohang Steelers	186	(17)
Total		384	(25)

International career
1997	South Korea	3	(0)

Managerial career
- 2016–2019: Pohang Steelers (youth)
- 2019–2023: Pohang Steelers
- 2024–: FC Seoul
- * Club domestic league appearances and goals

- Kim Gi-dong
- Hangul: 김기동
- Hanja: 金基東
- RR: Gim Gidong
- MR: Kim Kidong

Kim Gi-Dong (Korean: 김기동; born 12 January 1972) is a South Korean professional football manager and former player who played as a midfielder. He is currently the manager of K League 1 club FC Seoul.

Kim was born in Dangjin. In 1991, he debuted as a professional player with Pohang Steelers (then POSCO Atoms) right after his graduation from high school, which was quite unusual then. He started to appear in the top team matches after joining Yukong Elephants (Bucheon SK after 1996). Bucheon at that time was highly recognized to have a strong midfield under manager Valeri Nepomniachi, and he was a key member.

Kim returned to Pohang in 2003 and led the Steelers to the championship in 2007. He was also selected as the 'best eleven' of the league in 2007. He now holds 2nd place in career domestic appearance (league and cups) in K-League, only after goalkeeper Kim Byung-Ji.

On 9 July 2011, he became the oldest ever score in the K-League with his goal in the 7–0 victory over Daejeon Citizen.

== Career statistics ==
=== Club ===
Appearances and goals by club, season and competition
Club	Season	League			KFA Cup		League Cup		Continental		Total	
Club	Season	Division	Apps	Goals	Apps	Goals	Apps	Goals	Apps	Goals	Apps	Goals
POSCO Atoms	1991	K-League	0	0	—		—		—		0	0
POSCO Atoms	1992	K-League	0	0	—		0	0	—		0	0
POSCO Atoms	Total		0	0	—		0	0	—		0	0
Yukong Elephants/Bucheon SK	1993	K-League	3	0	—		4	0	—		7	0
Yukong Elephants/Bucheon SK	1994	K-League	11	0	—		4	0	—		15	0
Yukong Elephants/Bucheon SK	1995	K-League	25	0	—		4	0	—		29	0
Yukong Elephants/Bucheon SK	1996	K-League	30	2			3	0	—		33	2
Yukong Elephants/Bucheon SK	1997	K-League	4	0			10	5	—		14	5
Yukong Elephants/Bucheon SK	1998	K-League	14	0			20	1	—		34	1
Yukong Elephants/Bucheon SK	1999	K-League	27	2			9	1	—		36	3
Yukong Elephants/Bucheon SK	2000	K-League	30	1			11	0	—		41	1
Yukong Elephants/Bucheon SK	2001	K-League	27	0			3	1	—		30	1
Yukong Elephants/Bucheon SK	2002	K-League	27	3			8	1	—		35	4
Yukong Elephants/Bucheon SK	Total		198	8			76	9	—		274	17
Pohang Steelers	2003	K-League	30	3	3	0	—		—		33	3
Pohang Steelers	2004	K-League	20	0	1	0	5	1	—		26	1
Pohang Steelers	2005	K-League	24	2	3	0	12	1	—		39	3
Pohang Steelers	2006	K-League	21	0	2	0	4	0	—		27	0
Pohang Steelers	2007	K-League	30	4	6	0	6	0	—		42	4
Pohang Steelers	2008	K-League	18	3	2	0	1	0	4 (Note: Appearances in AFC Champions League)	0	25	3
Pohang Steelers	2009	K-League	20	3	1	2	3	1	7	0	31	6
Pohang Steelers	2010	K-League	9	0	1	1	4	0	0	0	14	1
Pohang Steelers	2011	K-League	14	2	1	0	6	2	—		21	4
Pohang Steelers	Total		186	17	20	3	41	5	11	0	258	25
Career total			384	25	20	3	117	14	11	0	532	42

=== International ===
Appearances and goals by national team and year
National team	Year	Apps	Goals
South Korea
South Korea	1997	3	0
Total		3	0

== Managerial statistics ==
As of match played 22 July 2026

Managerial record by team and tenure
Team	Nat.	From	To	Record					Ref.
Team	Nat.	From	To	G	W	D	L	Win %	Ref.
Pohang Steelers	(South Korea)	23 April 2019	13 December 2023	200	92	56	52	46.00	
FC Seoul	(South Korea)	14 December 2023	Present	110	45	31	34	40.91	
Career Total				310	137	87	86	44.19	

== Honours ==
=== Player ===
Pohang Steelers

- K League 1: 1992, 2007
- Korean League Cup: 2009
- AFC Champions League: 2009

Yukong Elephants / Bucheon SK

- Korean League Cup: 1994, 1996, 2000

Individual

- K League 1 Best XI: 2007

=== Manager ===
Pohang Steelers

- Korean FA Cup: 2023

FC Seoul

- K League 1: 2026

Individual

- K League 1 Manager of the Year: 2020
