= Cho Sung-hwan (footballer, born 1982) =

South Korean footballer

Cho Sung-hwan 조성환
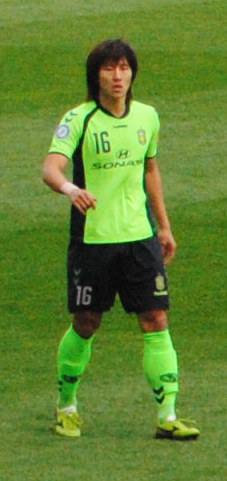

Personal information
- Full name: Cho Sung-hwan
- Date of birth: 9 April 1982 (age 44)
- Place of birth: Haman, Gyeongnam, South Korea
- Height: 1.86 m (6 ft 1 in)
- Position: Centre back

Senior career*
Years	Team	Apps	(Gls)
2001–2005	Suwon Samsung Bluewings	70	(1)
2005–2008	Pohang Steelers	64	(1)
2009–2010	Consadole Sapporo	36	(0)
2010–2012	Jeonbuk Hyundai Motors	47	(3)
2013–2014	Al Hilal	13	(1)
2014	Muaither	9	(1)
2015–2018	Jeonbuk Hyundai Motors	47	(1)
2020	Nongbua Pitchaya	4	(0)
2020–2021	Ayutthaya United	17	(0)
2021–2022	North Bangkok University	28	(0)

International career^{‡}
2002–2004	South Korea U-23	12	(0)
2003–2012	South Korea	4	(0)
Medal record
Representing South Korea
Men's football
Asian Games
Bronze medal – third place	2002 Busan	Team
- * Club domestic league appearances and goals as of 10 April 2022 ‡ National team caps and goals as of 7 January 2015

- Cho Sung-hwan
- Hangul: 조성환
- Hanja: 趙星桓
- RR: Jo Seonghwan
- MR: Cho Sŏnghwan

Cho Sung-hwan (born 9 April 1982) is a South Korean football defender.

His previous clubs are Suwon Samsung Bluewings, Pohang Steelers, Jeonbuk Hyundai Motors in South Korea, Consadole Sapporo in Japan, Saudi side Al Hilal Qatari side Muaither SC.

== Club statistics ==
Club performance			League		Cup		League Cup		Continental		Total	
Season	Club	League	Apps	Goals	Apps	Goals	Apps	Goals	Apps	Goals	Apps	Goals
South Korea			League		KFA Cup		League Cup		Asia		Total	
2001	Suwon Samsung Bluewings	K League 1	23	0	?	?	9	0	?	?		
2002	Suwon Samsung Bluewings	K League 1	18	1	?	?	5	1	?	?		
2003	Suwon Samsung Bluewings	K League 1	19	0	1	0	-		-		20	0
2004	Suwon Samsung Bluewings	K League 1	10	0	0	0	9	1	-		19	1
2005	Suwon Samsung Bluewings	K League 1	0	0	0	0	6	0	?	?		
2005	Pohang Steelers	K League 1	4	0	0	0	0	0	-		4	0
2006	Pohang Steelers	K League 1	23	0	1	0	5	0	-		29	0
2007	Pohang Steelers	K League 1	21	0	4	0	6	0	-		31	0
2008	Pohang Steelers	K League 1	16	1	4	0	2	0	4	0	26	1
Japan			League		Emperor's Cup		League Cup		Asia		Total	
2009	Consadole Sapporo	J2 League	36	0	0	0	-		-		36	0
2010	Consadole Sapporo	J2 League	0	0	0	0	-		-		0	0
South Korea			League		KFA Cup		League Cup		Asia		Total	
2010	Jeonbuk Hyundai Motors	K League 1	11	2	0	0	0	0	2	0	13	2
2011	Jeonbuk Hyundai Motors	K League 1	27	1	1	1	0	0	7	2	35	4
2012	Jeonbuk Hyundai Motors	K League 1	9	0	0	0	-		3	0	12	0
Saudi Arabia			League		Crown Prince Cup		League Cup		Asia		Total	
2013–14	Al Hilal	Professional League	13	1	1	0	-		-		14	1
Total	South Korea		181	5			42	2				
Total	Japan		36	0	0	0	-		-		36	0
Total	Saudi Arabia		13	1	1	0	-		-		14	1
Career total			230	6			42	2				

== National team statistics ==
Korea Republic national team
Year	Apps	Goals
2003	1	0
2004	0	0
2005	0	0
2006	1	0
2007	0	0
2008	1	0
2009	0	0
2010	0	0
2011	0	0
2012	1	0
Total	4	0
