= Hwang Ji-soo =

South Korean footballer (born 1981)

Personal information
- Date of birth: March 27, 1981 (age 45)
- Place of birth: Dongducheon, South Korea
- Height: 1.75 m (5 ft 9 in)
- Position: Central midfielder

Youth career
- Honam University

Senior career*
Years	Team	Apps	(Gls)
2004–2017	Pohang Steelers	270	(5)
2010–2011	→ Yangju Citizen (loan)		

International career
2008	South Korea	2	(0)
- * Club domestic league appearances and goals

Hwang Ji-soo (Korean: 황지수, born March 27, 1981) is a retired South Korean footballer who played with K League Classic side Pohang Steelers. He served under alternative military duties from 2010 to November 2011.

== Career statistics ==
As of 27 January 2012

Appearances and goals by club, season and competition
Club performance			League		National cup		League cup		Continental		Total	
Season	Club	League	Apps	Goals	Apps	Goals	Apps	Goals	Apps	Goals	Apps	Goals
South Korea			League		KFA Cup		League Cup		Asia		Total	
2004	Pohang Steelers	K-League	16	0	1	0	10	1	—		27	1
2005	Pohang Steelers	K-League	19	1	2	0	12	0	—		33	1
2006	Pohang Steelers	K-League	24	0	1	0	10	0	—		35	0
2007	Pohang Steelers	K-League	26	1	5	0	5	0	—		36	1
2008	Pohang Steelers	K-League	23	0	3	0	2	0	4	0	32	0
2009	Pohang Steelers	K-League	17	0	3	0	1	0	0	0	21	0
2010–2011	Yangju FC	K3 League			—		—		—			
2012	Pohang Steelers	K-League										
Career total			125	2	14	0	40	1	4	0	157	2
