= Lee Sang-hong =

South Korean footballer (born 1979)

Lee Sang-Hong
Personal information
- Date of birth: 4 February 1979 (age 47)
- Place of birth: Busan, South Korea
- Height: 1.78 m (5 ft 10 in)
- Position: Defender

Youth career
- Yonsei University

Senior career*
Years	Team	Apps	(Gls)
2003–2006	Bucheon SK / Jeju United	44	(0)
2007–2009	Gyeongnam FC	67	(0)
2010	Chunnam Dragons	22	(0)
2011	Busan I'Park	9	(0)
2014–	Jiangsu Sainty	0	(0)
- * Club domestic league appearances and goals as of 14 July 2011

Lee Sang-Hong (Korean: 이상홍; born February 4, 1979) is a South Korean football player. He previous played for Bucheon SK, Jeju United, Gyeongnam FC, Chunnam Dragons and Busan I'Park.

He was arrested on the charge connected with the match fixing allegations on 7 July 2011.

Sporting positions
Preceded by Kim Hyo-Il	Gyeongnam FC captain 2008-2009	Succeeded by Kim Young-Woo
