= Hwang Jae-won =

South Korean footballer (born 1981)

Hwang Jae-Won
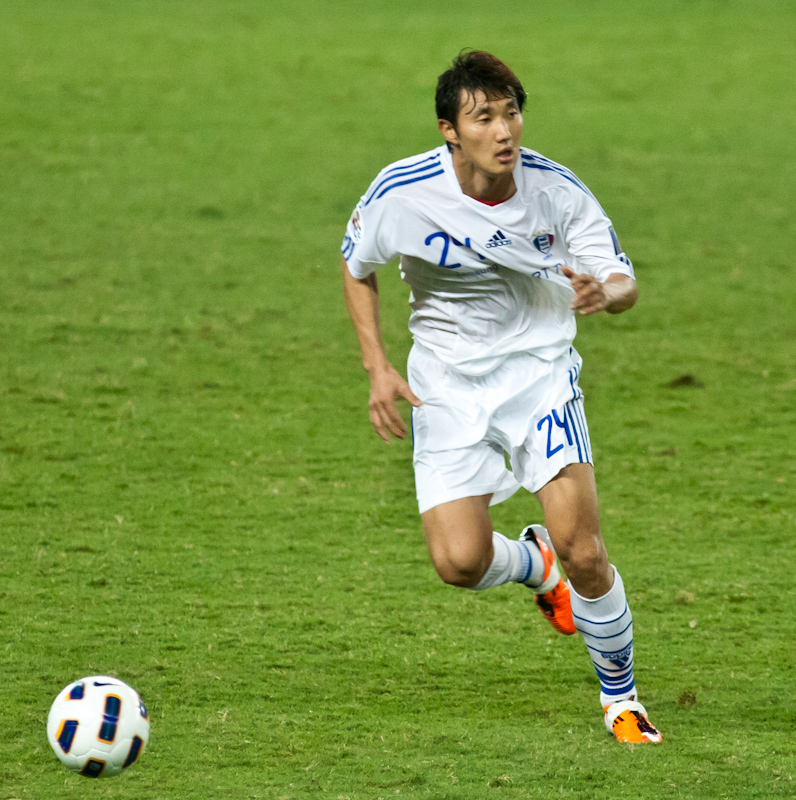
- Hwang with Suwon Bluewings in 2011

Personal information
- Full name: Hwang Jae-won
- Date of birth: 13 April 1981 (age 45)
- Place of birth: Seoul, South Korea
- Height: 1.86 m (6 ft 1 in)

Team information
- Current team: Pohang Steelers (scout)

Youth career
- 2001–2003: Ajou University

Senior career*
Years	Team	Apps	(Gls)
2004–2010	Pohang Steelers	79	(5)
2010–2011	Suwon Bluewings	18	(2)
2012–2014	Seongnam Ilhwa	9	(1)
2015	Chungju Hummel	23	(2)
2016–2018	Daegu FC	37	(2)
2018–2019	Daejeon Citizen	3	(0)

International career^{‡}
2008–2011	South Korea	11	(1)

Managerial career
- 2018–2019: Daejeon Citizen (playing coach)
- 2020-2021: Singhal High School (coach)
- 2022-: Pohang Steelers (scout)
- * Club domestic league appearances and goals as of 1 January 2019 ‡ National team caps and goals as of 25 March 2014

Hwang Jae-Won (Korean: 황재원; born 13 April 1981) was a South Korean football defender.

== Early life ==
Born in Ganghwa-gun, Incheon, he graduated from Ganghwa Middle School and Ganghwa High School. He graduated from Ajou University and accepted an offer to join Pohang Steelers, making his professional debut.

== Club career ==
From his debut season, he scored two goals despite being a defender, attracting attention as a goal-scoring defender, and starting in 2007, he began playing as a solid starter and played a leading role in the team's league championship that season. He also scored a goal with a head in a 2-1 semi-play-off win over arch-rivals Ulsan Hyundai.

In 2009, he was appointed as the team captain at Pohang and continued its success by winning the AFC Champions League, placing 3rd in the FIFA Club World Cup, and finishing 2nd in the K-League Regular League.

He was at the peak of his career to the point where he pushed for an overseas transfer, but he switched to Suwon Samsung Bluewings midway through the 2010 season, but due to injuries in the middle of the season, he was absent frequently and was pushed out of the starting eleven.

He was traded with Jo Dong-Gun to join Seongnam Ilhwa Chunma, there he only played 9 games in 3 years, in 2013 he undergoing surgery and rehabilitation for a chronic injury.

After a year of rehabilitation Jae-Won made a comeback at Chungju Hummel, and moved to Daegu FC in 2016. As injuries became more frequent, it seemed like he was repeating the nightmare of injuries of the past.

At Daejeon he failed to play in a single game in the 2019 season, and his contract with Daejeon Citizen was terminated and he retired after that.

== International career ==
Due to his performance in the 2007 season, he was selected by then national team coach Huh Jung-moo in 2008 and made his debut against Chile. Also he scored a dramatic equalizing goal in the 2011 AFC Asian Cup final between Korea and Japan in Qatar.

== Club career statistics ==
As of 14 November 2011

Club performance			League		Cup		League Cup		Continental		Total	
Season	Club	League	Apps	Goals	Apps	Goals	Apps	Goals	Apps	Goals	Apps	Goals
South Korea			League		KFA Cup		League Cup		Asia		Total	
2004	Pohang Steelers	K-League	4	0	0	0	10	2	-		14	2
2005	Pohang Steelers	K-League	0	0	0	0	0	0	-		0	0
2006	Pohang Steelers	K-League	12	2	0	0	0	0	-		12	2
2007	Pohang Steelers	K-League	28	2	5	2	4	0	-		37	4
2008	Pohang Steelers	K-League	19	1	2	1	2	0	2	1	25	3
2009	Pohang Steelers	K-League	18	1	1	0	5	0	10	1	34	2
2010	Pohang Steelers	K-League	6	0	1	0	3	0	5	1	15	1
2010	Suwon Samsung Bluewings	K-League	9	2	0	0	2	0	2	0	13	2
2011	Suwon Samsung Bluewings	K-League	9	0	0	0	0	0	5	0	14	0
2012	Seongnam Ilhwa Chunma	K-League										
Career total			105	8	9	3	26	2	24	3	164	16

== International goals ==
#	Date	Venue	Opponent	Score	Result	Competition
1	25 January 2011	Thani bin Jassim Stadium, Al Rayyan, Qatar	Japan	2–2	2–2 (a.e.t., 0–3p)	2011 AFC Asian Cup

== Honours ==
Pohang Steelers

- K-League: 2007
- Korean FA Cup: 2008
- K-League Cup: 2009
- AFC Champions League: 2009

Individual

- K-League Best XI: 2007, 2009
- AFC footballer of the year nomination: 2009
