= Sérgio Farias =

Brazilian football manager (born 1967)

Personal information
- Full name: Sérgio Ricardo de Paiva Farias
- Date of birth: 9 June 1967 (age 59)
- Place of birth: Roraima, Brazil

Team information
- Current team: Borneo Samarinda (head coach)

Managerial career
- Years: Team
- 1993–1994: São Mateus-ES
- 1994–1995: Dahra
- 1995–1998: Serrano-RJ
- 1998–1999: Brazil U-20
- 1999–2000: Juventus
- 2000: Santos FC U-20
- 2000–2001: Brazil U-17
- 2001: Brazil U-20
- 2002: Santos FC U-20
- 2003–2004: União Barbarense
- 2005–2009: Pohang Steelers
- 2010: Al-Ahli
- 2010–2011: Al Wasl
- 2012–2013: Guangzhou R&F
- 2014: Duque de Caxias
- 2014–2015: Suphanburi
- 2016: NorthEast United
- 2016–2017: Suphanburi
- 2018: Al Hilal Club
- 2020: Persija Jakarta
- 2021–2022: Umm Salal
- 2022–2023: Al-Khor
- 2023: Kazma
- 2025: Bashundhara Kings
- 2026–: Borneo Samarinda

Sérgio Ricardo de Paiva Farias (born 9 June 1967) is a Brazilian football manager. He is best known for his continental accomplishments during his four-year reign as Pohang Steelers.He is currently the head coach of the Indonesia Super League club, Borneo Samarinda.

== Managerial career ==
After many achievements in Brazil, with big clubs as well as their youth sides – Farias decided to move abroad in seek of a new adventure. That is when Farias and Pohang Steelers in South Korea found each other. Farias won the AFC Champions League with Pohang Steelers in 2009. He coached Qatar Stars League club Umm Salal SC from July 2021 to June 2022. In June 2022 he joined Qatari Second Division club Al-Khor SC. On 5 July 2023, he joined Kuwaiti Premier League club Kazma SC. On 28 July 2025, he joined Bangladesh Premier League (football) club Bashundhara Kings.

== Managerial statistics ==
As of match played 22 November 2026

Managerial record by team and tenure
Team	Nat.	From	To	Record								Ref.
Team	Nat.	From	To	G	W	D	L	GF	GA	GD	Win %	Ref.
Borneo Samarinda	(Indonesia)	10 November 2026	Present	2	1	1	0	1	0	+1	50.00	
Career Total				2	1	1	0	1	0	+1	50.00	

== Honours ==
Brazil U-17

- South American U-17 Championship: 2001

União Barbarense

- Campeonato Brasileiro Série C: 2004

Pohang Steelers

- K League 1: 2007
- Korean FA Cup: 2008
- Korean League Cup: 2009
- AFC Champions League: 2009
- FIFA Club World Cup third place: 2009

Individual

- K League Manager of the Year: 2007

Awards and achievements
Preceded by Akira Nishino	AFC Champions League winning manager 2009	Succeeded by Shin Tae-Yong
