= Seongnam FC =

South Korean professional association football club

- Full name: Seongnam Football Club 성남시민프로축구단
- Nicknames: Kkachi; Korean: 까치 (The Magpies)
- Short name: SFC
- Founded: 18 March 1989; 37 years ago (as Ilhwa Chunma)
- Ground: Tancheon Stadium
- Capacity: 16,146
- Owner: Seongnam City Council
- Chairman: Shin Sang-jin (Mayor of Seongnam)
- Manager: Kim Hae-woon
- League: K League 2
- 2025: K League 2, 5th of 14
- Website: www.seongnamfc.com
Home colours	Away colours

- Seongnam FC
- Hangul: 성남시민프로축구단
- Hanja: 城南市民프로蹴球團
- Revised Romanization: Seongnam Simin Peuro Chukgudan
- McCune–Reischauer: Sŏngnam Simin P'ŭro Ch'ukkudan

Seongnam Football Club (Korean: 성남 FC) is a South Korean professional football club based in Seongnam competing in K League 2, the second tier of the South Korean football league system. It is one of the most successful clubs in South Korea and the Asian Football Confederation, having won the K League 1 seven times and the AFC Champions League twice. The club was ranked fifth in the IFFHS Asian Clubs of the 20th century ranking.

== History ==
=== Ilhwa Chunma era (1989–2013) ===
==== Foundation ====
In 1975, Sun Myung Moon, the owner of Tongil Group, wanted to found a professional football club in South Korea. After the Korean Super League was founded in 1983, he tried to establish a club to participate in the league, but Choi Soon-young, the head of Korea Football Association, ignored Moon's interest due to religious reasons.

Nevertheless, Tongil Group prepared the foundation of a new football club from 1986 and finally obtained a license from the KFA as a club based in Seoul. Tongil Group had initially considered establishing the club in the Honam region, but could not do so due to objection from the local community.

Ilhwa Chunma FC's crest, used between 1989 and 2000

The club was officially founded on 18 March 1989 as Ilhwa Chunma Football Club, and became the sixth member of the Korean Super League. The foundation ceremony was held in the Sheraton Walkerhill Hotel in Seoul.

The club had signed six players including Ko Jeong-woon and appointed Park Jong-hwan as the head coach. The contract with Park was considered a lucrative deal at the time, with a signing bonus of 100 million KRW paid alongside an annual salary of 48 million KRW.

==== Early Successes ====
The club was successful from its beginning, winning its first League Cup three years after its foundation in 1992 and winning three consecutive league titles from 1993 to 1995. In 1995, K League clubs wanted to stop the club's third consecutive title and agreed to change the league format back to two stages with a championship playoffs system; however, Ilhwa Chunma still won the title.

The club won its first Asian title in the same year, defeating Saudi Arabian side Al Nassr in the final to achieve a league and continental double.

==== Move to Cheonan ====
The club was forced to move out of Seoul in 1996 following the implementation of the K League decentralization policy. Ilhwa Chunma moved to the city of Cheonan as the city council proposed converting the Cheonan Oryong Stadium into a football-specific stadium and building another sports complex in Baekseok-dong. The club also changed its name to Cheonan Ilhwa Chunma as a part of the policy.

By the end of 1997, Ilhwa was still enjoying success. The club reached the final of the 1996–97 Asian Club Championship and the 1997 Korean FA Cup. However, from 1998, the club went into a slump as a number of core players moved away from the club for various reasons. One of these players was the club's goalkeeper, Valeri Sarychev, who was forced to move as the K League gradually introduced restrictions on appearances by foreign goalkeepers.

As a result, Ilhwa finished at the bottom of the league for two consecutive seasons, in 1998 and 1999. In mid-1999, Cha Kyung-bok offered to resign voluntarily due to the poor results. On 21 November 1999, Cheonan Ilhwa Chunma were crowned as the winners of the 1999 Korean FA Cup after beating Jeonbuk Hyundai Dinos 3-0 in the final, held at Jeju Stadium.

==== Relocation to Seongnam ====
In 2000, the club moved to the Seoul satellite city of Seongnam and renamed themselves to Seongnam Ilhwa Chunma. The move worked out well, as the rejuvenated club went on to win three consecutive K League titles from 2001 to 2003, as well as a league cup title in 2002 and an A3 Champions Cup in 2004. A disappointing 2004 campaign saw them relinquish their title. The club's shock defeat at home to Saudi Arabian side Al Ittihad in the ACL final the same year led to the resignation of their manager Cha Kyung-bok.

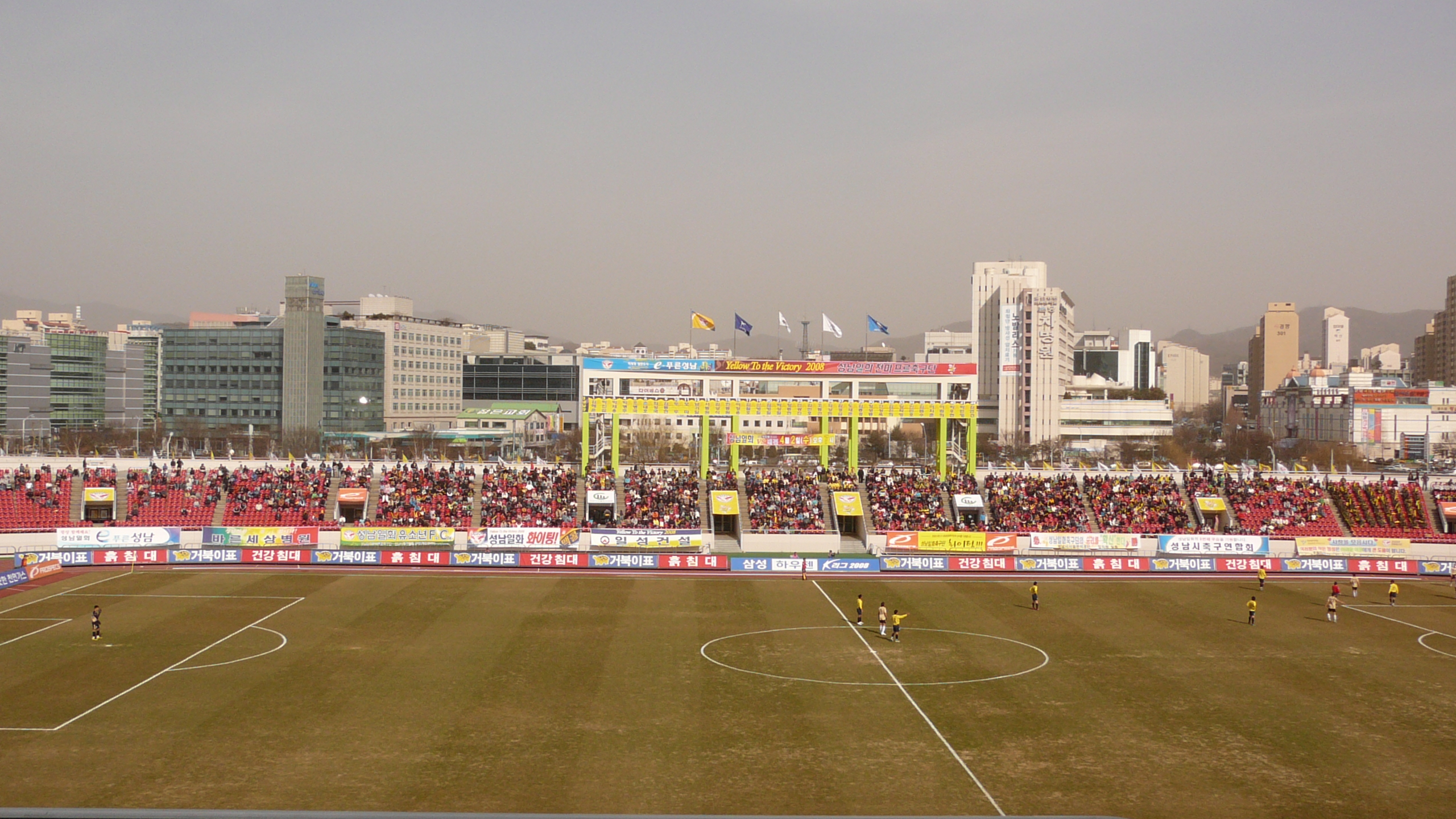
Seongnam FC fans at Tancheon Stadium in a game vs. Suwon Samsung Bluewings

Under Kim Hak-bum's management, the club bounced back to the forefront of South Korean football as they claimed their seventh league title in 2006, defeating Suwon Samsung Bluewings 3–1 on aggregate in the championship playoff final. This was their seventh K League title, a record among all the K League clubs.

In the 2007 season, they went undefeated for 22 consecutive league matches (the third longest streak in the history of the K League) before finally being defeated by Suwon Samsung Bluewings 2–1 on 15 July 2007. Seongnam finished the regular season of the 2007 K League Championship in first place but were beaten 4–1 on aggregate in the championship final by Pohang Steelers.

Seongnam's former player Shin Tae-yong returned as caretaker manager in the 2009 season before being officially appointed as manager from the following season as the club's successes continued. Seongnam won the 2010 AFC Champions League, defeating local rivals Suwon in the quarter-finals and going on to beat Iranian side Zob Ahan 3-1 in the final in front of 27,000 fans in Tokyo's National Stadium. This was their second AFC Champions League title and qualified them directly into the quarter-finals stage of the 2010 FIFA Club World Cup which they finished fourth.

Seongnam added another FA Cup trophy to their collection in 2011, beating Suwon 1–0 in the final.

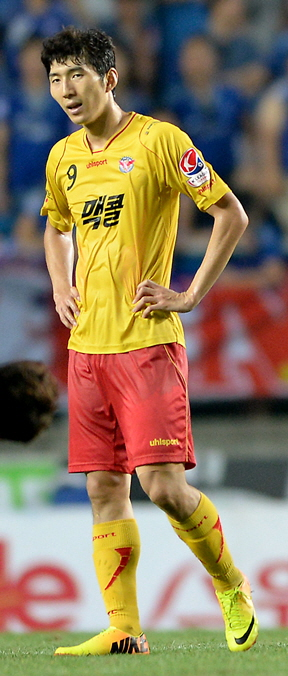
Seongnam's uniforms during the Ilhwa Chunma era were yellow and orange.

=== Seongnam FC era (2014–present) ===
In October 2013, Lee Jae-myung, the mayor of Seongnam, announced that Seongnam City Council had agreed to take over the club from Ilhwa Sports, and that it would henceforth be known as Seongnam FC. In December 2013, Seongnam City officially took over the club from Ilhwa Co., Ltd.

Seongnam changed its symbol from the cheonma, which was the symbol of the Unification Church, to the magpie, the symbol of the Seongnam City. The club's yellow uniform was also changed to black. Park Jong-hwan, who had managed the club from 1988 to 1996, became manager once again.

The club played the first home game as Seongnam FC on 15 March 2014 against FC Seoul, resulting in a 0–0 draw. The first post-rebranding victory came on 26 March, when they beat bitter rivals Suwon Samsung Bluewings 2–0. The following month, manager Park Jong-hwan resigned after it was revealed that he had been assaulting players.

After months of confusion, the club appointed Kim Hak-bum, who led the club during their glory years, as manager. His return turned out to be a success, as Seongnam not only escaped relegation but also won their third FA Cup trophy, beating FC Seoul in a penalty shoot-out.

In the 2016 season, after Incheon's win over Suwon FC on the final day of the season, Seongnam finished 11th and were relegated to the second division for the first time in their history after being defeated by Gangwon FC on away goals rule in the promotion-relegation playoffs.

Nam Ki-il was announced as the club's new manager on 6 December 2017, replacing Park Kyung-hoon. He led Seongnam FC to promotion back to the first division just one season after their relegation. Nam resigned his position as the manager of the club on 16 December 2019. Kim Nam-il was appointed as the club's new manager on 23 December 2019 to lead the club in the 2020 K League 1 season.

In 2022, the club was once again relegated to K League 2. The club finished the 2024 K League 2 season at the bottom of the league table, but remained in the league as there is no promotion and relegation between K League 2 and K3 League.

== Stadium and facilities ==
The club has played their home games in Tancheon Stadium in Yatap-dong, Bundang District, since 2005. The stadium earned the nickname "Tancheon Fortress" (탄천요새) in the 2000s due to the club's successful home record in the AFC Champions League.

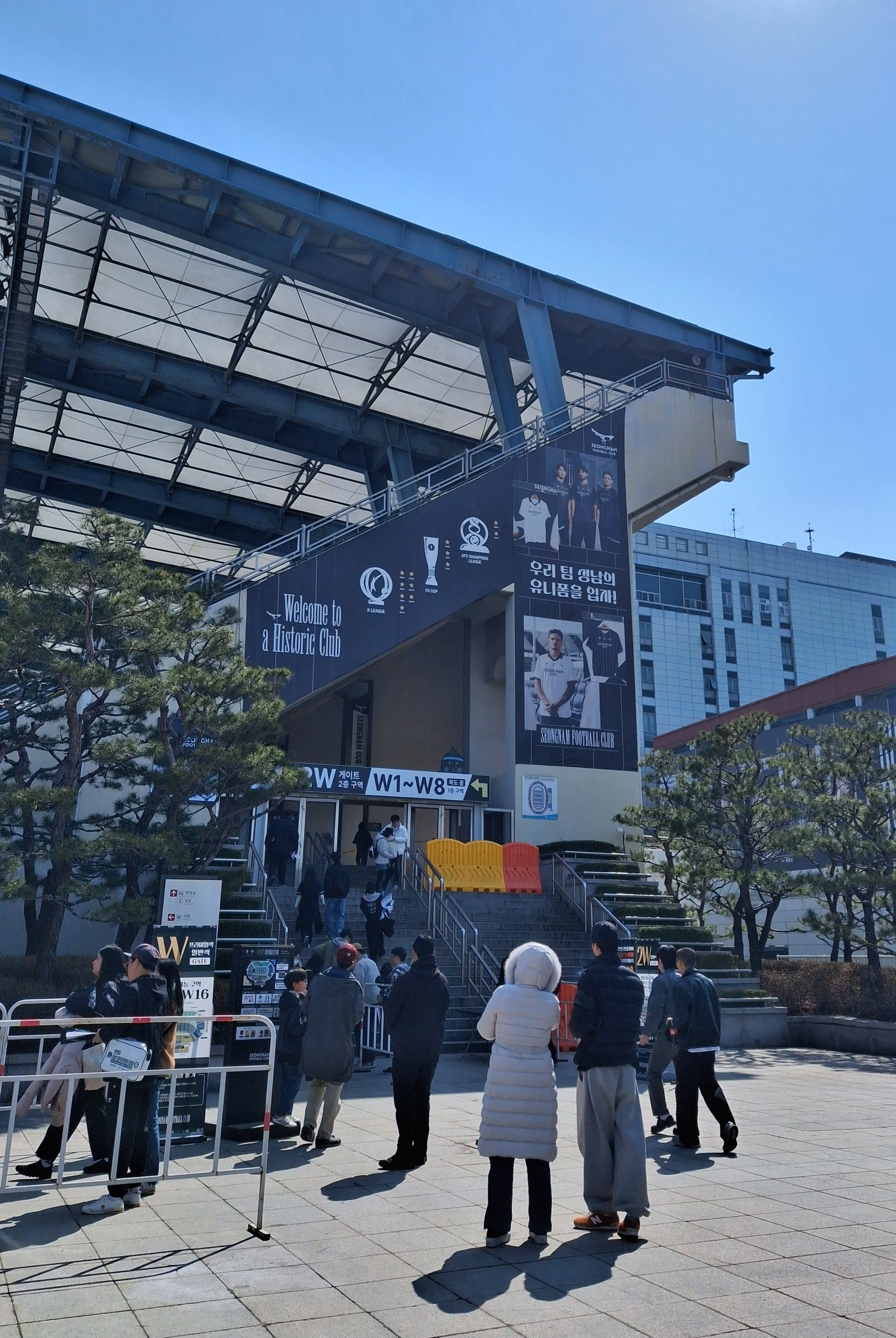
Tancheon second floor west entrance

The modern Seongnam Football Center in nearby Jeongja-dong, which serves as the club's training ground, was completed in December 2021, having been built at a cost of 26 billion won. It includes a natural grass training field, sauna, weight room, physical therapy room, and medical facilities.

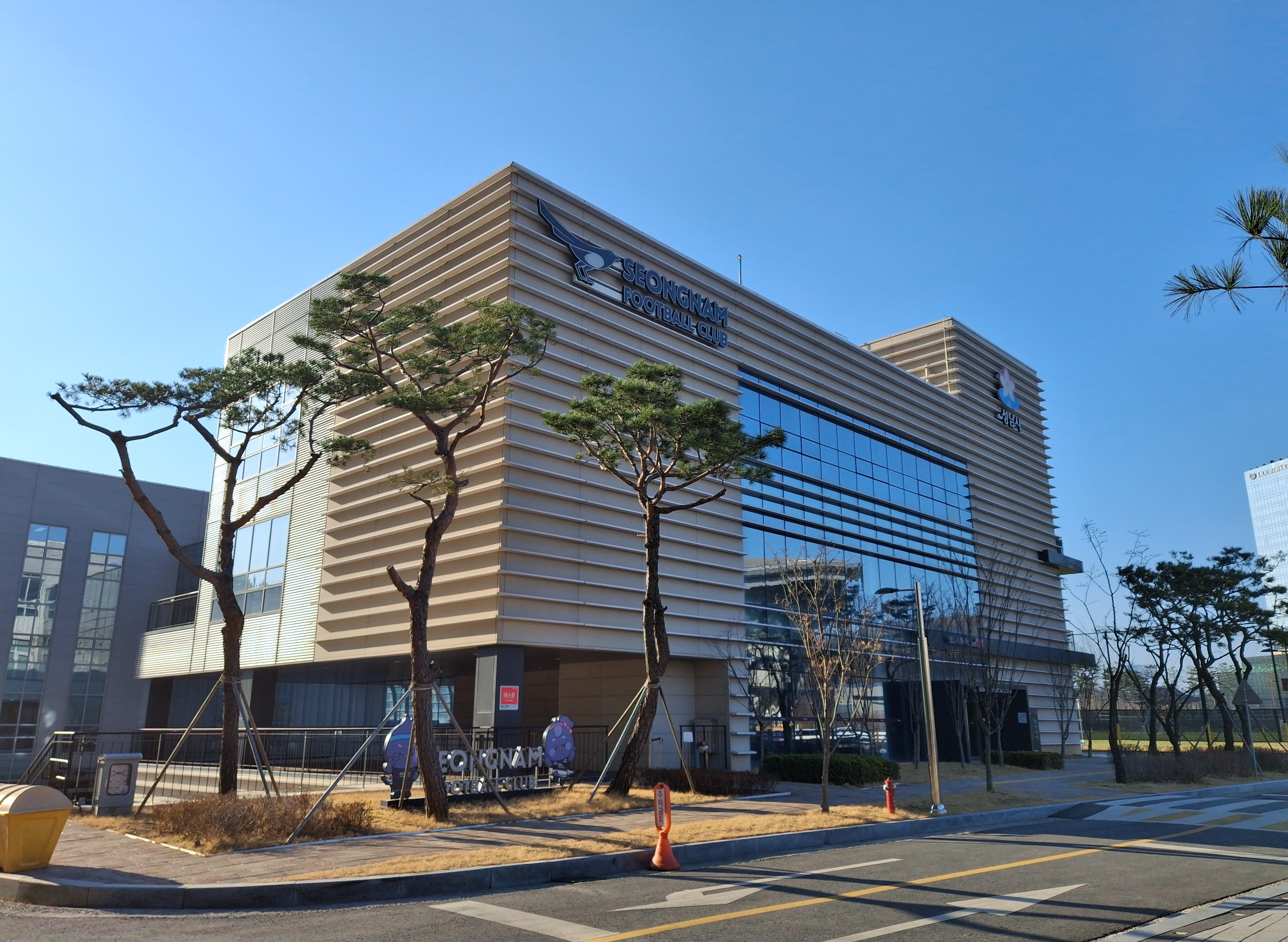
Seongnam Football Center exterior

=== Historical ===
Seongnam previously played their home games in the Cheonan Oryong Stadium when the club was based in Cheonan. On 22 August 1998, Cheonan Ilhwa Chunma had to finish the game against Jeonnam Dragons during the penalty shoot-out, after 1–1 draw in extra time. According to K League regulations back then, teams were required to decide the winner with the golden goal or the penalty shoot-out after the extra time, if the match score is level at the end of normal time. Since the stadium was not equipped with a floodlight system, they had to finish their games before sunset. Cheonan Ilhwa Chunma won the game by a draw.

== Supporters and rivalries ==
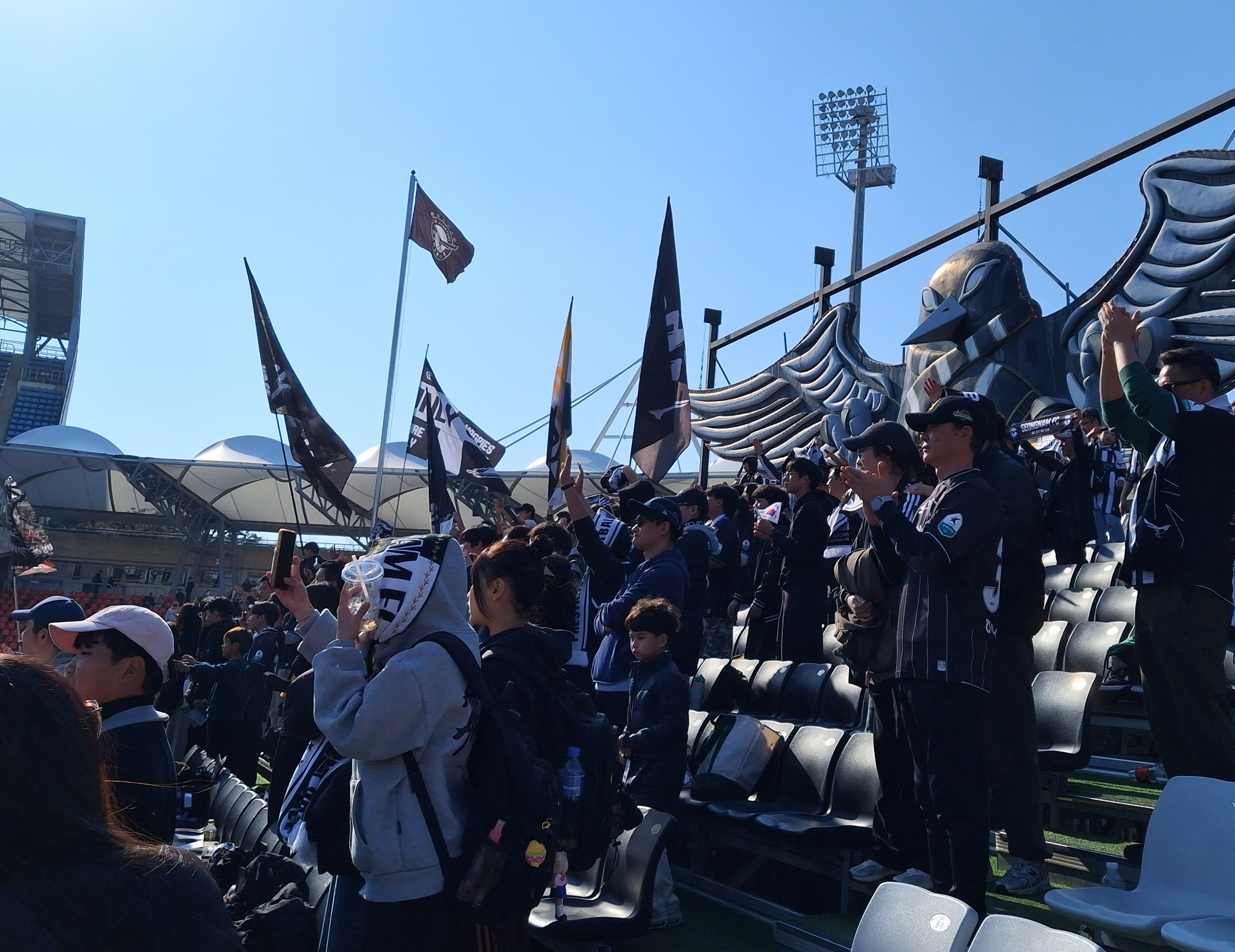
Black List supporters' group in the Black Zone stand

The club's main supporters group is called Black List. They cheer at the Black Zone stand in the north end of their stadium. Supporters of Seongnam have worked to protect the club amid rumors of its departure or dissolution. The club draws supporters from not only Seongnam itself but also nearby Hanam, Yongin, Gwangju, and southeastern Seoul.

Seongnam's biggest rival team is Suwon Samsung Bluewings. Their rivalry has been dubbed the Magyedaejeon.

== Current squad ==
As of 20 November 2026

Note: Flags indicate national team as defined under FIFA eligibility rules; some limited exceptions apply. Players may hold more than one non-FIFA nationality.

No.	Pos.	Nation	Player
1	GK	KOR	Lee Gwang-yeon
2	DF	KOR	Hwang Seok-ki
3	DF	KOR	Yoo Min-jun
4	DF	BRA	Venício Tomás (captain)
5	DF	KOR	Yoo Sun
7	MF	KOR	Hong Chang-bum
8	FW	KOR	Lee Jeong-bin
9	FW	BRA	Rodrigo Angelotti
10	FW	COL	Paul Villero (on loan from Ponte Preta)
11	FW	KOR	Lee Jun-sang (vice-captain)
13	MF	KOR	Hong Suk-hyun
14	MF	BRA	Elionay Freitas
16	MF	KOR	Ryu Jun-seon
17	MF	KOR	Park Byung-gyu
18	FW	KOR	Kim Min-jae
19	MF	KOR	Yang Tae-yang

No.	Pos.	Nation	Player
21	MF	KOR	Park Sang-hyeok
22	DF	KOR	Jung Seung-yong
23	FW	KOR	You Ju-an
25	DF	JPN	Shun Kudo
27	DF	KOR	Kwon Byung-jun
28	GK	KOR	Jeong Myeong-jae
32	FW	KOR	Yun Min-ho
33	DF	KOR	Kim Chan-il
34	MF	KOR	Lee Soo-yoon
35	FW	KOR	Kim Ji-hyeok
36	MF	KOR	Lee Jae-uk
52	DF	JPN	Ryoji Fujimori
66	DF	KOR	Kim Young-han
90	FW	KOR	Jeon Min-gyu
91	GK	KOR	An Jae-min
94	DF	KOR	Lee Ji-hun

=== Out on loan ===
Note: Flags indicate national team as defined under FIFA eligibility rules; some limited exceptions apply. Players may hold more than one non-FIFA nationality.

No. / Pos. / Nation / Player; — / MF / KOR / Jang Yeong-gi (to Changwon FC)	No. / Pos. / Nation / Player; — / MF / KOR / Kook Kwan-woo (to Gyeongju KHNP)

== Managers ==
List of Seongnam FC managers
No.	Name	From	To	Season(s)	Notes
1	(South Korea) Park Jong-hwan	1988/09/16	1996/04/02	1989–1995	
C	(South Korea) Won Heung-jae	1990/04/27	1990/06/27	1990	Unofficial caretaker
C	(South Korea) Lee Jang-soo	1996/04/03	1996/08/17	1996	
2	(South Korea) Lee Jang-soo	1996/08/18	1996/12/05	1996	
3	(Belgium) René Desaeyere	1996/12/18	1998/09/08	1997–1998	
4	(South Korea) Cha Kyung-bok	1998/09/09	2004/12/01	1998–2004	
C	(South Korea) Kim Hak-bum	2004/12/07	2004/12/29	2004	In charge in the FA Cup
5	(South Korea) Kim Hak-bum	2004/12/30	2008/11/27	2005–2008	
C	(South Korea) Shin Tae-yong	2008/12/06	2010/02/17	2009	
6	(South Korea) Shin Tae-yong	2010/02/18	2012/12/08	2010–2012	
7	(South Korea) An Ik-soo	2012/12/14	2013/12/22	2013	
8	(South Korea) Park Jong-hwan	2013/12/23	2014/04/22	2014	
C	(South Korea) Lee Sang-yoon	2014/04/22	2014/08/26	2014	
C	(South Korea) Lee Young-jin	2014/08/26	2014/09/05	2014	
9	(South Korea) Kim Hak-bum	2014/09/05	2016/09/12	2014–2016	
C	(South Korea) Gu Sang-bum	2016/09/12	2016/11/20	2016	
C	(South Korea) Byun Sung-hwan	2016/11/06	2016/11/20	2016	Unofficial caretaker
10	(South Korea) Park Kyung-hoon	2016/12/01	2017/11/27	2017	
11	(South Korea) Nam Ki-il	2017/12/06	2019/12/16	2018–2019	
12	(South Korea) Kim Nam-il	2019/12/26	2022/08/24	2020–2022	
C	(South Korea) Chung Kyung-ho	2022/08/24	2022/10/15	2022	
13	(South Korea) Lee Ki-hyung	2022/12/09	2024/03/20	2023–2024	
C	(South Korea) Choi Chul-woo	2024/03/22	2024/05/18	2024	
14	(South Korea) Choi Chul-woo	2024/05/18	2024/08/06	2024	
C	(South Korea) Kim Hae-woon	2024/08/06	2024/09/10	2024	
15	(South Korea) Jeon Kyung-jun	2024/09/10	2026/08/04	2024–2026	
C	(South Korea) Han Dong-hoon	2026/08/04	2026/08/11	2026	
16	(South Korea) Kim Hae-woon	2026/08/11		2026–	

== Honours ==
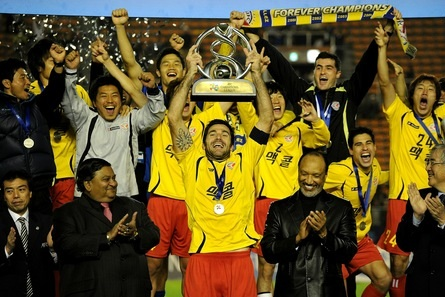
Seongnam Ilhwa Chunma won the AFC Champions League in 2010

=== Domestic ===
==== League ====
- K League 1
  - Winners (7): 1993, 1994, 1995, 2001, 2002, 2003, 2006
  - Runners-up (3): 1992, 2007, 2009
- K League 2
  - Runners-up (1): 2018

==== Cups ====
- Korean FA Cup
  - Winners (3): 1999, 2011, 2014
  - Runners-up (3): 1997, 2000, 2009
- Korean League Cup
  - Winners (3): 1992, 2002, 2004
  - Runners-up (3): 1995, 2000, 2006
- Korean Super Cup
  - Winners (1): 2002
  - Runners-up (2): 2000, 2004
- President's Cup
  - Winners (1): 1999 (Note: Reserve team)

=== International ===
==== Asian ====
- Asian Club Championship/AFC Champions League Elite
  - Winners (2): 1995, 2010
  - Runners-up (2): 1996–97, 2004
- Asian Super Cup
  - Winners (1): 1996
- A3 Champions Cup
  - Winners (1): 2004

==== Worldwide ====
- FIFA Club World Cup
  - Fourth place (1): 2010
- Afro-Asian Club Championship
  - Winners (1): 1996

== Season-by-season records ==
Season	Division	Tms.	Pos.	Korean Cup	AFC CL
1989	1	6	5	—	—
1990	1	6	6	—	—
1991	1	6	5	—	—
1992	1	6	2	—	—
1993	1	6	1	—	—
1994	1	7	1	—	—
1995	1	8	1	—	Semi-final
1996	1	9	8	Quarter-final	Winners
1997	1	10	8	Runners-up	Runners-up
1998	1	10	10	Quarter-final	—
1999	1	10	10	Winners	—
2000	1	10	3	Runners-up	—
2001	1	10	1	Quarter-final	—
2002	1	10	1	Semi-final	—
2003	1	12	1	Round of 16	Group stage
2004	1	13	9	Round of 32	Runners-up
2005	1	13	3	Round of 16	—
2006	1	14	1	Round of 32	—
2007	1	14	2	Round of 16	Semi-final
2008	1	14	5	Quarter-final	—
2009	1	15	2	Runners-up	—
2010	1	15	4	Quarter-final	Winners
2011	1	16	10	Winners	—
2012	1	16	12	Round of 16	Round of 16
2013	1	14	8	Round of 16	—
2014	1	12	9	Winners	—
2015	1	12	5	Quarter-final	Round of 16
2016	1	12	11	Quarter-final	—
2017	2	10	4	Quarter-final	—
2018	2	10	2	Round of 32	—
2019	1	12	9	Round of 32	—
2020	1	12	10	Semi-final	—
2021	1	12	10	Round of 16	—
2022	1	12	12	Round of 16	—
2023	2	13	9	Round of 16	—
2024	2	13	13	Quarter-final	—
2025	2	14	5	Second round	—

Key

- Tms. = Number of teams
- Pos. = Position in league

== AFC Champions League record ==
Season	Round	Opposition	Home	Away	Agg.
2003	Group B	(Thailand) Osotsapa	6–0 (Note: Played at a neutral venue.)		2nd
2003	Group B	(Japan) Shimizu S-Pulse	2–1		2nd
2003	Group B	(China) Dalian Shide	1–3		2nd
2004	Group G	(Indonesia) Persik Kediri	15–0	2–1	1st
2004	Group G	(Vietnam) Bình Định	2–0	3–1	1st
2004	Group G	(Japan) Yokohama F. Marinos	0–1	2–1	1st
2004	Quarter-final	(United Arab Emirates) Sharjah	6–0	5–2	11–2
2004	Semi-final	(Uzbekistan) Pakhtakor	0–0	2–0	2–0
2004	Final	(Saudi Arabia) Al-Ittihad	0–5	3–1	3–6
2007	Group G	(Vietnam) Dong Tam Long An	4–1	2–1	1st
2007	Group G	(China) Shandong Luneng Taishan	3–0	1–2	1st
2007	Group G	(Australia) Adelaide United	1–0	2–2	1st
2007	Quarter-final	(Syria) Al-Karamah	2–1	2–0	4–1
2007	Semi-final	(Japan) Urawa Red Diamonds	2–2	2–2 (a.e.t.)	4–4 (3–5 p)
2010	Group E	(Japan) Kawasaki Frontale	2–0	0–3	1st
2010	Group E	(Australia) Melbourne Victory	3–2	2–0	1st
2010	Group E	(China) Beijing Guoan	3–1	1–0	1st
2010	Round of 16	(Japan) Gamba Osaka	3–0	—N/a	—N/a
2010	Quarter-final	(South Korea) Suwon Samsung Bluewings	4–1	0–2	4–3
2010	Semi-final	(Saudi Arabia) Al-Shabab	1–0	3–4	4–4 (a)
2010	Final	(Iran) Zob Ahan	3–1		—N/a
2012	Group G	(Japan) Nagoya Grampus	1–1	2–2	1st
2012	Group G	(China) Tianjin TEDA	1–1	3–0	1st
2012	Group G	(Australia) Central Coast Mariners	5–0	1–1	1st
2012	Round of 16	(Uzbekistan) Bunyodkor	0–1	—N/a	—N/a
2015	Group F	(Thailand) Buriram United	2–1	1–2	2nd
2015	Group F	(Japan) Gamba Osaka	2–0	1–2	2nd
2015	Group F	(China) Guangzhou R&F	0–0	1–0	2nd
2015	Round of 16	(China) Guangzhou Evergrande	2–1	0–2	2–3
