= 2006 K League =

Samsung Hauzen K League
- Season: 2006
- Dates: Regular season: 12 March – 5 November 2006; Championship: 11–25 November 2006
- Champions: Seongnam Ilhwa Chunma (7th title)
- Champions League: Seongnam Ilhwa Chunma; Jeonbuk Hyundai Motors; Jeonnam Dragons
- Matches played: 182
- Goals scored: 403 (2.21 per match)
- Best Player: Kim Do-heon
- Top goalscorer: Woo Sung-yong (16 goals)

The 2006 K League was the 24th season of the K League, which kicked off on March 12. The format of the regular season and playoffs was the same as the one used in the 2005 season. It took a break for the 2006 FIFA World Cup in June and July. The playoff games were held in November.

SK Group, the owners of Bucheon SK, moved their club to Jeju, and renamed the club Jeju United. The club was based in the Jeju World Cup Stadium of Seogwipo. Gyeongnam FC joined the K League, increasing the number of clubs to fourteen.

== Teams ==
=== Foreign players ===
Club	Player 1	Player 2	Player 3	Former players
Busan IPark	(Brazil) Luciano	(Brazil) Popó	(Brazil) Somália	(Brazil) Gefferson
Jeonnam Dragons	(Brazil) Sandro Hiroshi	(Brazil) Selmir		(Romania) Adrian Neaga
Daegu FC	(Brazil) Eduardo Marques	(Brazil) Gabriel Lima		
Daejeon Citizen	(Brazil) Adriano Chuva	(Brazil) Denílson	(Brazil) Róbson	(Brazil) Eduardo Rato (Brazil) Régis Pitbull
FC Seoul	(Brazil) Adilson	(Portugal) Ricardo Nascimento		
Gwangju Sangmu Bulsajo				
Gyeongnam FC	(Colombia) Harry Castillo	(Brazil) Rogério Pinheiro		
Incheon United	(Montenegro) Dženan Radončić	(North Macedonia) Blazhe Ilijoski	(Serbia) Dragan Mladenović	(Brazil) Selmir (Croatia) Jasmin Agić
Jeju United	(Bosnia and Herzegovina) Nikola Vasiljević	(Brazil) Irineu	(Brazil) Marquinhos	
Jeonbuk Hyundai Motors	(Brazil) Raphael Botti	(Brazil) Zé Carlos		(Colombia) Milton Rodríguez
Pohang Steelers	(Argentina) Carlos Frontini	(Brazil) André Luiz Tavares	(Brazil) Luciano Henrique	
Seongnam Ilhwa Chunma	(Brazil) Mota	(Romania) Adrian Neaga		(Brazil) Dudu (Brazil) Jefferson Feijão
Suwon Samsung Bluewings	(Brazil) Itamar	(Croatia) Mato Neretljak	(Uruguay) Juan Manuel Olivera	(Brazil) Nádson (Russia) Denis Laktionov
Ulsan Hyundai	(Brazil) Leandrão	(Brazil) Leandro Machado	(Brazil) Vinícius	(Brazil) Zé Carlos

== Regular season ==
=== First stage ===
==== League table ====
The first place team qualified for the championship playoffs.

Pos	Team	Pld	W	D	L	GF	GA	GD	Pts	Qualification
1	Seongnam Ilhwa Chunma	13	10	2	1	21	9	+12	32	Qualification for the playoffs
2	Pohang Steelers	13	6	4	3	21	15	+6	22	
3	Daejeon Citizen	13	4	7	2	13	10	+3	19	
4	FC Seoul	13	3	7	3	13	10	+3	16	
5	Jeonnam Dragons	13	2	10	1	14	12	+2	16	
6	Busan IPark	13	4	4	5	24	25	−1	16	
7	Jeonbuk Hyundai Motors	13	3	7	3	13	14	−1	16	
8	Suwon Samsung Bluewings	13	3	7	3	11	13	−2	16	
9	Ulsan Hyundai Horang-i	13	3	6	4	9	13	−4	15	
10	Incheon United	13	2	8	3	11	13	−2	14	
11	Daegu FC	13	2	7	4	14	16	−2	13	
12	Gwangju Sangmu Bulsajo	13	2	7	4	10	13	−3	13	
13	Gyeongnam FC	13	3	4	6	10	15	−5	13	
14	Jeju United	13	1	6	6	8	14	−6	9	

Source: RSSSF

==== Results ====
Home \ Away	BIP	JND	DGU	DJC	SEO	GWJ	GNM	ICU	JJU	JHM	PHS	SIC	SSB	USH
Busan IPark	—	1–1	—	—	—	—	3–2	1–2	0–0	3–1	2–1	—	—	1–1
Jeonnam Dragons	—	—	—	—	—	—	1–1	3–0	—	0–0	2–2	1–1	—	1–0
Daegu FC	4–4	2–2	—	1–1	—	2–1	0–1	—	2–2	0–1	—	—	—	—
Daejeon Citizen	1–0	2–0	—	—	0–0	—	—	1–0	—	—	—	0–1	0–0	0–0
FC Seoul	5–2	0–0	1–2	—	—	0–0	—	0–0	—	1–1	—	—	—	—
Gwangju Sangmu	2–0	0–0	—	2–2	—	—	—	—	2–0	—	0–3	—	0–0	—
Gyeongnam FC	—	—	—	0–0	2–1	1–1	—	—	0–0	—	0–1	0–1	2–1	—
Incheon United	—	—	0–0	—	—	1–1	3–1	—	0–0	0–0	—	1–1	—	—
Jeju United	—	2–2	—	0–1	0–3	—	—	—	—	—	—	0–1	0–0	3–0
Jeonbuk Hyundai Motors	—	—	—	1–1	—	1–1	2–0	—	2–1	—	—	0–1	—	1–1
Pohang Steelers	—	—	0–0	5–4	0–1	—	—	2–2	1–0	3–1	—	—	—	0–0
Seongnam Ilhwa Chunma	4–3	—	2–1	—	2–0	2–0	—	—	—	—	2–1	—	0–1	—
Suwon Samsung Bluewings	1–4	1–1	0–0	—	1–1	—	—	1–0	—	2–2	1–2	—	—	—
Ulsan Hyundai	—	—	1–0	—	0–0	1–0	1–0	2–2	—	—	—	1–3	1–2	—

Source: RSSSF
Legend: Blue = home team win; Yellow = draw; Red = away team win.

=== Second stage ===
==== League table ====
The first place team qualified for the championship playoffs.

Pos	Team	Pld	W	D	L	GF	GA	GD	Pts	Qualification
1	Suwon Samsung Bluewings	13	8	3	2	18	9	+9	27	Qualification for the playoffs
2	Pohang Steelers	13	7	4	2	21	13	+8	25	
3	FC Seoul	13	6	5	2	18	12	+6	23	
4	Daegu FC	13	6	3	4	18	14	+4	21	
5	Ulsan Hyundai Horang-i	13	5	5	3	12	9	+3	20	
6	Incheon United	13	5	4	4	13	14	−1	19	
7	Jeonnam Dragons	13	5	3	5	14	13	+1	18	
8	Busan IPark	13	5	3	5	16	17	−1	18	
9	Seongnam Ilhwa Chunma	13	4	5	4	21	16	+5	17	
10	Jeju United	13	4	4	5	15	16	−1	16	
11	Gyeongnam FC	13	4	1	8	12	20	−8	13	
12	Daejeon Citizen	13	3	3	7	15	22	−7	12	
13	Jeonbuk Hyundai Motors	13	2	4	7	11	20	−9	10	
14	Gwangju Sangmu Bulsajo	13	3	1	9	7	16	−9	10	

Source: RSSSF

==== Results ====
Home \ Away	BIP	JND	DGU	DJC	SEO	GWJ	GNM	ICU	JJU	JHM	PHS	SIC	SSB	USH
Busan IPark	—	—	1–3	4–2	1–1	2–0	—	—	—	—	—	0–2	0–2	—
Jeonnam Dragons	1–3	—	1–1	2–2	2–2	2–0	—	—	2–1	—	—	—	1–0	—
Daegu FC	—	—	—	—	2–0	—	—	3–2	—	—	1–1	0–2	1–2	3–1
Daejeon Citizen	—	—	0–1	—	—	3–1	3–1	—	0–1	0–1	2–1	—	—	—
FC Seoul	—	—	—	1–1	—	—	1–0	—	1–0	—	3–1	2–2	1–1	2–2
Gwangju Sangmu	—	—	0–1	—	0–2	—	0–1	2–0	—	2–1	—	1–0	—	0–0
Gyeongnam FC	1–0	0–2	3–2	—	—	—	—	2–2	—	3–0	—	—	—	0–1
Incheon United	0–0	0–2	—	1–0	1–0	—	—	—	—	—	1–1	—	1–2	1–0
Jeju United	0–1	—	0–0	—	—	1–0	2–1	2–3	—	2–1	0–0	—	—	—
Jeonbuk Hyundai Motors	0–2	1–0	1–3	—	1–2	—	—	0–1	—	—	1–1	—	1–1	—
Pohang Steelers	4–1	2–1	—	—	—	2–1	2–0	—	—	—	—	3–2	2–0	—
Seongnam Ilhwa Chunma	—	0–0	—	4–0	—	—	3–0	0–0	3–3	3–3	—	—	—	0–1
Suwon Samsung Bluewings	—	—	—	1–1	—	1–0	2–0	—	2–1	—	—	3–0	—	1–0
Ulsan Hyundai	1–1	1–0	—	3–1	—	—	—	—	2–2	0–0	0–1	—	—	—

Source: RSSSF
Legend: Blue = home team win; Yellow = draw; Red = away team win.

=== Overall table ===
The top two teams in the overall table qualified for the championship playoffs.

Pos	Team	Pld	W	D	L	GF	GA	GD	Pts	Qualification
1	Seongnam Ilhwa Chunma	26	14	7	5	42	25	+17	49	First stage winners
2	Pohang Steelers	26	13	8	5	42	28	+14	47	Qualification for the playoffs
3	Suwon Samsung Bluewings	26	11	10	5	29	22	+7	43	Second stage winners
4	FC Seoul	26	9	12	5	31	22	+9	39	Qualification for the playoffs
5	Ulsan Hyundai Horang-i	26	8	11	7	21	22	−1	35	
6	Jeonnam Dragons	26	7	13	6	28	25	+3	34	Qualification for the Champions League (Note: Qualified as champions of the FA Cup.)
7	Daegu FC	26	8	10	8	32	30	+2	34	
8	Busan IPark	26	9	7	10	40	42	−2	34	
9	Incheon United	26	7	12	7	24	27	−3	33	
10	Daejeon Citizen	26	7	10	9	28	32	−4	31	
11	Jeonbuk Hyundai Motors	26	5	11	10	24	34	−10	26	Qualification for the Champions League (Note: Qualified as defending champions of the Champions League.)
12	Gyeongnam FC	26	7	5	14	22	35	−13	26	
13	Jeju United	26	5	10	11	23	30	−7	25	
14	Gwangju Sangmu Bulsajo	26	5	8	13	17	29	−12	23	

Source: RSSSF

== Championship playoffs ==
=== Bracket ===
Semi-finals
Seongnam Ilhwa Chunma	1
FC Seoul	0
Suwon Samsung Bluewings	1
Pohang Steelers	0

Final
Seongnam Ilhwa Chunma	1	2	3
Suwon Samsung Bluewings	0	1	1

=== Final table ===
Pos	Team	Qualification
1	Seongnam Ilhwa Chunma (C)	Qualification for the Champions League
2	Suwon Samsung Bluewings	
3	Pohang Steelers	
4	FC Seoul	

Source: RSSSF
(C) Champions

== Top scorers ==
This list includes goals of the championship playoffs.

Rank	Player	Club	Goals	Apps
1	(South Korea) Woo Sung-yong	Seongnam Ilhwa Chunma	16	28
2	(Brazil) Popo	Busan IPark	13	24
3	(South Korea) Kim Eun-jung	FC Seoul	9	25
4	(South Korea) Ko Ki-gu	Pohang Steelers	8	22
5	(South Korea) Lee Dong-gook	Pohang Steelers	7	10
5	(Brazil) Somália	Busan IPark	7	16
5	(Brazil) Denilson	Daejeon Citizen	7	18
5	(Brazil) Mota	Seongnam Ilhwa Chunma	7	19
5	(Brazil) Selmir	Jeonnam Dragons	7	20
5	(Brazil) Itamar	Suwon Samsung Bluewings	7	25
5	(South Korea) Park Chu-young	FC Seoul	7	26

== Awards ==
=== Main awards ===
Award	Winner	Club
Most Valuable Player	(South Korea) Kim Do-heon	Seongnam Ilhwa Chunma
Top goalscorer	(South Korea) Woo Sung-yong	Seongnam Ilhwa Chunma
Top assist provider	(Brazil) Adriano Chuva	Daejeon Citizen
Rookie of the Year	(South Korea) Yeom Ki-hun	Jeonbuk Hyundai Motors
Manager of the Year	(South Korea) Kim Hak-bum	Seongnam Ilhwa Chunma
Special Award	(South Korea) Kim Byung-ji	FC Seoul
Special Award	(South Korea) Choi Eun-sung	Daejeon Citizen
Special Award	(South Korea) Lee Jung-rae	Gyeongnam FC
Best Referee	(South Korea) Lee Young-chul	—
Best Assistant Referee	(South Korea) Ahn Sang-gi	—

=== Best XI ===
Position	Winner	Club
Goalkeeper	(South Korea) Park Ho-jin	Suwon Samsung Bluewings
Defenders	(South Korea) Jang Hak-young	Seongnam Ilhwa Chunma
Defenders	(Croatia) Mato Neretljak	Suwon Samsung Bluewings
Defenders	(South Korea) Choi Jin-cheul	Jeonbuk Hyundai Motors
Defenders	(South Korea) Kim Young-chul	Seongnam Ilhwa Chunma
Midfielders	(South Korea) Kim Do-heon	Seongnam Ilhwa Chunma
Midfielders	(South Korea) Lee Kwan-woo	Suwon Samsung Bluewings
Midfielders	(South Korea) Baek Ji-hoon	Suwon Samsung Bluewings
Midfielders	(Brazil) Popó	Busan IPark
Forwards	(South Korea) Woo Sung-yong	Seongnam Ilhwa Chunma
Forwards	(South Korea) Kim Eun-jung	FC Seoul

== See also ==
- 2006 in South Korean football
- 2006 K League Championship
- 2006 Korean League Cup
- 2006 Korean FA Cup
