= 2009 K League Championship =

Tournament details
- Host country: South Korea
- Dates: 21 November – 6 December 2009
- Teams: 6

Final positions
- Champions: Jeonbuk Hyundai Motors
- Runners-up: Seongnam Ilhwa Chunma

Tournament statistics
- Matches played: 6
- Goals scored: 10 (1.67 per match)
- Attendance: 110,816 (18,469 per match)
- Top scorer(s): Mauricio Molina; Eninho (2 goals each)

The 2009 K League Championship was the 13th competition of the K League Championship, and was held to decide the 27th champions of the K League. The top six clubs of the regular season qualified for the championship. The winners of the regular season directly qualified for the final, and second place team qualified for the semi-final. The other four clubs entered the first round, and the winners of the second round advanced to the semi-final. Each match was played as a single match, excluding the final which consisted of two matches. Jeonbuk Hyundai Motors became the champions for the first time by defeating Seongnam Ilhwa Chunma 3–1 on aggregate in the final.

== Qualified teams ==
Pos	Team	Pld	W	D	L	GF	GA	GD	Pts	Qualification
1	Jeonbuk Hyundai Motors	28	17	6	5	59	33	+26	57	Qualification for the playoffs final
2	Pohang Steelers	28	14	11	3	55	33	+22	53	Qualification for the playoffs semi-final
3	FC Seoul	28	16	5	7	47	27	+20	53	Qualification for the playoffs first round
4	Seongnam Ilhwa Chunma	28	13	6	9	40	34	+6	45	Qualification for the playoffs first round
5	Incheon United	28	11	10	7	31	29	+2	43	Qualification for the playoffs first round
6	Jeonnam Dragons	28	11	9	8	41	39	+2	42	Qualification for the playoffs first round

Source: K League (in Korean)
Rules for classification: 1) Points; 2) Goal difference; 3) Goals scored

== Bracket ==
First round
3	FC Seoul	1 (2)
6	Jeonnam Dragons (p)	1 (3)
4	Seongnam Ilhwa Chunma (p)	1 (3)
5	Incheon United	1 (2)

Second round
Seongnam Ilhwa Chunma	1
Jeonnam Dragons	0

Semifinal
2	Pohang Steelers	0
Seongnam Ilhwa Chunma	1

Final
1	Jeonbuk Hyundai Motors	0	3	3
Seongnam Ilhwa Chunma	0	1	1

== First round ==
=== Seoul vs Jeonnam ===
21 November 2009
17:00 KST

FC Seoul	1–1 (a.e.t.)	Jeonnam Dragons
Jung Jo-gook 15'	Report	Lee Kyu-ro 70'
Penalties
Kim Jin-kyu (penalty scored); Lee Sang-hyup (penalty missed); Ki Sung-yueng (penalty missed); Kim Seung-yong (penalty scored); Lee Jong-min (penalty missed)	2–3	(penalty missed) Kim Hyung-ho; (penalty scored) Jung Yoon-sung; (penalty missed) Song Jung-hyun; (penalty scored) Wesley; (penalty scored) Kwak Tae-hwi

Seoul World Cup Stadium, Seoul
Attendance: 13,116
Referee: Choi Gwang-bo (South Korea)

FC Seoul	Jeonnam Dragons

GK	1	(South Korea) Kim Ho-jun
RB	17	(South Korea) Lee Jong-min
CB	6	(South Korea) Kim Jin-kyu	(yellow card) 120'
CB	22	(South Korea) Kim Chi-gon (c)
LB	8	(Brazil) Adilson
RM	21	(South Korea) Ki Sung-yueng
CM	14	(South Korea) Kim Han-yoon	(yellow card) 19'	(substituted off) 85'
CM	16	(South Korea) Koh Myong-jin		(substituted off) 63'
LM	7	(South Korea) Kim Chi-woo		(substituted off) 105'
FW	9	(South Korea) Jung Jo-gook		(substituted off) 76'
FW	28	(South Korea) Lee Seung-ryul	(yellow card) 88'
Substitutes:
GK	41	(South Korea) Park Dong-suk
DF	4	(South Korea) Park Yong-ho
MF	20	(South Korea) Han Tae-you	(yellow card) 101'	(substituted on) 76'
FW	11	(South Korea) Kim Seung-yong		(substituted on) 105'
FW	18	(Brazil) Anderson	(yellow card) 100'	(substituted on) 63'
FW	19	(South Korea) Lee Sang-hyup		(substituted on) 85'
Manager:
(Turkey) Şenol Güneş

GK	21	(South Korea) Yeom Dong-gyun (c)
CB	5	(South Korea) Kwak Tae-hwi
CB	32	(South Korea) Kim Hyung-ho
CB	3	(South Korea) Park Ji-yong
RM	12	(South Korea) Lee Kyu-ro	(yellow card) 28'	(substituted off) 90+2'
CM	45	(South Korea) Song Han-bok
CM	14	(South Korea) Baek Seung-min
LM	43	(South Korea) Lee Wan		(substituted off) 108'
RW	15	(Brazil) Wesley	(yellow card) 8'
LW	19	(South Korea) Ju Kwang-youn		(substituted off) 69'
ST	10	(Brazil) Adriano Chuva	(yellow card) 22'	(substituted off) 96'
Substitutes:
GK	31	(South Korea) Ryu Won-woo
DF	4	(South Korea) Jung In-whan		(substituted on) 108'
DF	28	(South Korea) Jeong Jun-yeon		(substituted on) 90+2'
MF	11	(South Korea) Song Jung-hyun		(substituted on) 69'
MF	25	(South Korea) Yoo Hong-youl
FW	18	(South Korea) Jung Yoon-sung		(substituted on) 96'
Manager:
(South Korea) Park Hang-seo

Man of the Match:
Yeom Dong-gyun (Jeonnam Dragons)

Assistant referees:
Kim Sun-jin (South Korea)
Son Jae-sun (South Korea)
Fourth official:
Choi Myung-yong (South Korea)

=== Seongnam vs Incheon ===
22 November 2009
14:30 KST

Seongnam Ilhwa Chunma	1–1 (a.e.t.)	Incheon United
Radončić 100'	Report	Kim Min-soo 112'
Penalties
Radončić (penalty missed); Cho Dong-geon (penalty scored); Jung Sung-ryong (penalty missed); Molina (penalty scored); Kim Yong-dae (penalty scored)	3–2	(penalty missed) Yoo Byung-soo; (penalty scored) An Jae-jun; (penalty scored) Lee Se-joo; (penalty missed) Jeong Hyuk; (penalty missed) Čadikovski

Tancheon Sports Complex, Seongnam
Attendance: 10,946
Referee: Ko Geum-bok (South Korea)

Seongnam Ilhwa Chunma	Incheon United

GK	1	(South Korea) Jung Sung-ryong
RB	16	(South Korea) Kim Sung-hwan	(yellow card) 19'
CB	4	(Australia) Saša Ognenovski	(red card) 45+4'
CB	6	(South Korea) Jeon Kwang-jin	(yellow card) 41'
LB	33	(South Korea) Jang Hak-young
DM	8	(South Korea) Lee Ho
DM	14	(South Korea) Kim Jung-woo (c)	(yellow card) 23'	(substituted off) 120'
CM	11	(Colombia) Mauricio Molina	(yellow card) 101'
RW	23	(Brazil) Fabrício		(substituted off) 89'
LW	20	(South Korea) Kim Jin-yong		(substituted off) 45'
FW	10	(Montenegro) Dženan Radončić
Substitutes:
GK	44	(South Korea) Kim Yong-dae		(substituted on) 120'
DF	2	(South Korea) Ko Jae-sung
DF	5	(South Korea) Cho Byung-kuk	(yellow card) 84' (yellow-red card) 92'	(substituted on) 45'
MF	17	(South Korea) Kim Cheol-ho
FW	15	(South Korea) Han Dong-won
FW	18	(South Korea) Cho Dong-geon		(substituted on) 89'
Manager:
(South Korea) Shin Tae-yong

GK	25	(South Korea) Song Yoo-geol
CB	2	(South Korea) Kim Young-bin
CB	20	(South Korea) Lim Joong-yong	(yellow card) 81'
CB	3	(South Korea) Jang Won-seok		(substituted off) 15'
DM	28	(South Korea) Lee Se-joo
DM	17	(South Korea) Jeon Jae-ho	(yellow card) 62'	(substituted off) 118'
RM	44	(South Korea) Kim Min-soo	(yellow card) 45+3'
CM	4	(South Korea) No Jong-gun	(yellow card) 74'
LM	34	(South Korea) Lee Jun-young (c)		(substituted off) 64'
FW	21	(South Korea) Do Hwa-sung		(substituted off) 90'
FW	15	(South Korea) Yoo Byung-soo
Substitutes:
GK	1	(South Korea) Kim Lee-sub
DF	27	(South Korea) An Jae-jun		(substituted on) 118'
MF	29	(South Korea) Jeong Hyuk	(yellow card) 76'	(substituted on) 15'
MF	39	(South Korea) Yoon Won-il
FW	9	(South Korea) Kang Su-il		(substituted on) 64'
FW	31	(North Macedonia) Dragan Čadikovski		(substituted on) 90'
Manager:
(Serbia) Ilija Petković

Man of the Match:
Mauricio Molina (Seongnam Ilhwa Chunma)

Assistant referees:
Won Chang-ho (South Korea)
Kim Jung-sik (South Korea)
Fourth official:
Lee Young-chul (South Korea)

== Second round ==
25 November 2009
19:00 KST

Seongnam Ilhwa Chunma	1–0	Jeonnam Dragons
Molina 23'	Report

Tancheon Sports Complex, Seongnam
Attendance: 12,283
Referee: Lee Young-chul (South Korea)

Seongnam Ilhwa Chunma	Jeonnam Dragons

GK	1	(South Korea) Jung Sung-ryong
RB	16	(South Korea) Kim Sung-hwan
CB	40	(South Korea) Park Woo-hyun
CB	6	(South Korea) Jeon Kwang-jin	(yellow card) 73'
LB	33	(South Korea) Jang Hak-young
DM	8	(South Korea) Lee Ho	(yellow card) 72'
CM	14	(South Korea) Kim Jung-woo (c)
CM	17	(South Korea) Kim Cheol-ho		(substituted off) 90+2'
RW	18	(South Korea) Cho Dong-geon		(substituted off) 77'
LW	11	(Colombia) Mauricio Molina
FW	10	(Montenegro) Dženan Radončić	(yellow card) 61'
Substitutes:
GK	44	(South Korea) Kim Yong-dae
DF	2	(South Korea) Ko Jae-sung		(substituted on) 90+2'
DF	39	(South Korea) Kim Tae-yoon
MF	9	(South Korea) Hong Jin-sub
FW	15	(South Korea) Han Dong-won
FW	20	(South Korea) Kim Jin-yong		(substituted on) 77'
Manager:
(South Korea) Shin Tae-yong

GK	21	(South Korea) Yeom Dong-gyun (c)
DF	5	(South Korea) Kwak Tae-hwi
DF	32	(South Korea) Kim Hyung-ho
DF	43	(South Korea) Lee Wan
MF	12	(South Korea) Lee Kyu-ro
MF	14	(South Korea) Baek Seung-min
MF	26	(South Korea) Ko Cha-won		(substituted off) 49'
MF	45	(South Korea) Song Han-bok		(substituted off) 72'
FW	15	(Brazil) Wesley
FW	10	(Brazil) Adriano Chuva
FW	19	(South Korea) Ju Kwang-youn		(substituted off) 57'
Substitutes:
GK	31	(South Korea) Ryu Won-woo
DF	3	(South Korea) Park Ji-yong
DF	4	(South Korea) Jung In-whan
MF	8	(South Korea) Kim Seung-hyun	(yellow card) 90+6'	(substituted on) 57'
MF	11	(South Korea) Song Jung-hyun		(substituted on) 49'
FW	18	(South Korea) Jung Yoon-sung	(yellow card) 82'	(substituted on) 72'
Manager:
(South Korea) Park Hang-seo

Man of the Match:
Mauricio Molina (Seongnam Ilhwa Chunma)

Assistant referees:
Kim Sun-jin (South Korea)
Won Chang-ho (South Korea)
Fourth official:
Lee Sam-ho (South Korea)

== Semi-final ==
29 November 2009
15:00 KST

Pohang Steelers	0–1	Seongnam Ilhwa Chunma
	Report	Molina 44'

Pohang Steel Yard, Pohang
Attendance: 16,854
Referee: Choi Myung-yong (South Korea)

Pohang Steelers	Seongnam Ilhwa Chunma

GK	1	(South Korea) Shin Hwa-yong
RB	2	(South Korea) Choi Hyo-jin	(yellow card) 74'
CB	24	(South Korea) Hwang Jae-won (c)
CB	32	(South Korea) Kim Hyung-il
LB	16	(South Korea) Kim Jung-kyum
MF	20	(South Korea) Shin Hyung-min	(yellow card) 55'
MF	5	(South Korea) Kim Tae-su
MF	7	(South Korea) Kim Jae-sung		(substituted off) 53'
FW	10	(Brazil) Denilson		(substituted off) 66'
FW	22	(South Korea) No Byung-jun
FW	99	(North Macedonia) Stevica Ristić		(substituted off) 59'
Substitutes:
GK	21	(South Korea) Song Dong-jin
DF	30	(Japan) Kazunari Okayama
MF	6	(South Korea) Kim Gi-dong
MF	8	(South Korea) Hwang Jin-sung		(substituted on) 53'
MF	28	(South Korea) Song Chang-ho		(substituted on) 66'
FW	23	(South Korea) Yoo Chang-hyun		(substituted on) 59'
Manager:
(Brazil) Sérgio Farias

GK	1	(South Korea) Jung Sung-ryong
RB	16	(South Korea) Kim Sung-hwan
CB	40	(South Korea) Park Woo-hyun	(yellow card) 48'
CB	5	(South Korea) Cho Byung-kuk	(yellow card) 65'
LB	33	(South Korea) Jang Hak-young	(red card) 72'
RM	11	(Colombia) Mauricio Molina
CM	8	(South Korea) Lee Ho	(yellow card) 52'
CM	14	(South Korea) Kim Jung-woo (c)
LM	17	(South Korea) Kim Cheol-ho
FW	18	(South Korea) Cho Dong-geon		(substituted off) 64'
FW	10	(Montenegro) Dženan Radončić	(yellow card) 62'
Substitutes:
GK	44	(South Korea) Kim Yong-dae
DF	2	(South Korea) Ko Jae-sung
DF	39	(South Korea) Kim Tae-yoon
MF	9	(South Korea) Hong Jin-sub
FW	15	(South Korea) Han Dong-won
FW	20	(South Korea) Kim Jin-yong		(substituted on) 64'
Manager:
(South Korea) Shin Tae-yong

Man of the Match:
Jung Sung-ryong (Seongnam Ilhwa Chunma)

Assistant referees:
Son Jae-sun (South Korea)
Jung Hae-sang (South Korea)
Fourth official:
Lee Sang-yong (South Korea)

== Final ==
=== First leg ===
2 December 2009
19:00 KST

Seongnam Ilhwa Chunma	0–0	Jeonbuk Hyundai Motors
	Report

Tancheon Sports Complex, Seongnam
Attendance: 21,371
Referee: Lee Sang-yong (South Korea)

Seongnam Ilhwa Chunma	Jeonbuk Hyundai Motors

GK	1	(South Korea) Jung Sung-ryong
RB	16	(South Korea) Kim Sung-hwan
CB	4	(Australia) Saša Ognenovski (c)	(yellow card) 69'
CB	5	(South Korea) Cho Byung-kuk
LB	40	(South Korea) Park Woo-hyun
DM	6	(South Korea) Jeon Kwang-jin
DM	17	(South Korea) Kim Cheol-ho	(yellow card) 36'
RM	8	(Brazil) Fabrício		(substituted off) 85'
CM	11	(Colombia) Mauricio Molina
LM	20	(South Korea) Kim Jin-yong		(substituted off) 83'
FW	18	(South Korea) Cho Dong-geon
Substitutes:
GK	44	(South Korea) Kim Yong-dae
DF	2	(South Korea) Ko Jae-sung
MF	9	(South Korea) Hong Jin-sub		(substituted on) 85'
MF	12	(South Korea) Choi Jae-young
MF	19	(South Korea) Shin Young-chul
FW	15	(South Korea) Han Dong-won		(substituted on) 83'
Manager:
(South Korea) Shin Tae-yong

GK	1	(South Korea) Kwon Sun-tae
RB	2	(South Korea) Choi Chul-soon
CB	4	(South Korea) Kim Sang-sik (c)
CB	17	(South Korea) Lim You-hwan
LB	6	(South Korea) Jin Kyung-sun	(yellow card) 56'
CM	13	(South Korea) Jung Hoon
CM	7	(South Korea) Ha Dae-sung	(yellow card) 20'	(substituted off) 62'
CM	10	(Brazil) Luiz Henrique
RW	11	(South Korea) Choi Tae-uk
LW	33	(Brazil) Brasília		(substituted off) 53'
FW	20	(South Korea) Lee Dong-gook
Substitutes:
GK	21	(South Korea) Kim Min-sik
DF	16	(South Korea) Shin Kwang-hoon
DF	29	(South Korea) Lee Kwang-hyun
MF	8	(Brazil) Eninho		(substituted on) 53'
MF	26	(South Korea) Seo Jung-jin
FW	15	(South Korea) Lee Gwang-jae		(substituted on) 62'
Manager:
(South Korea) Choi Kang-hee

Man of the Match:
Lee Dong-gook (Jeonbuk Hyundai Motors)

Assistant referees:
Kim Sun-jin (South Korea)
Kim Yong-soo (South Korea)
Fourth official:
Choi Gwang-bo (South Korea)

=== Second leg ===
6 December 2009
14:00 KST

Jeonbuk Hyundai Motors	3–1	Seongnam Ilhwa Chunma
Eninho 21', 39'; Lee Dong-gook 72' (pen.)	Report	Kim Jin-yong 84'

Jeonju World Cup Stadium, Jeonju
Attendance: 36,246
Referee: Choi Gwang-bo (South Korea)

Jeonbuk Hyundai Motors	Seongnam Ilhwa Chunma

GK	1	(South Korea) Kwon Sun-tae	(yellow card) 90+3'
RB	2	(South Korea) Choi Chul-soon
CB	17	(South Korea) Lim You-hwan
CB	5	(South Korea) Son Seung-joon
LB	6	(South Korea) Jin Kyung-sun
CM	4	(South Korea) Kim Sang-sik (c)	(yellow card) 45+1'
CM	13	(South Korea) Jung Hoon		(substituted off) 75'
CM	10	(Brazil) Luiz Henrique
RW	11	(South Korea) Choi Tae-uk		(substituted off) 81'
LW	8	(Brazil) Eninho		(substituted off) 90'
FW	20	(South Korea) Lee Dong-gook
Substitutes:
GK	21	(South Korea) Kim Min-sik
DF	29	(South Korea) Lee Kwang-hyun		(substituted on) 90'
MF	7	(South Korea) Ha Dae-sung		(substituted on) 75'
MF	26	(South Korea) Seo Jung-jin		(substituted on) 81'
FW	15	(South Korea) Lee Gwang-jae
FW	33	(Brazil) Brasília
Manager:
(South Korea) Choi Kang-hee

GK	1	(South Korea) Jung Sung-ryong
RB	16	(South Korea) Kim Sung-hwan	(yellow card) 77'
CB	4	(Australia) Saša Ognenovski
CB	5	(South Korea) Cho Byung-kuk	(yellow card) 71'
LB	40	(South Korea) Park Woo-hyun
CM	6	(South Korea) Jeon Kwang-jin	(yellow card) 60'	(substituted off) 72'
CM	17	(South Korea) Kim Cheol-ho		(substituted off) 45'
LM	8	(South Korea) Lee Ho (c)
RW	23	(Brazil) Fabrício	(yellow card) 53'	(substituted off) 63'
LW	11	(Colombia) Mauricio Molina	(yellow card) 22'
FW	10	(Montenegro) Dženan Radončić
Substitutes:
GK	44	(South Korea) Kim Yong-dae
DF	2	(South Korea) Ko Jae-sung
MF	9	(South Korea) Hong Jin-sub
FW	15	(South Korea) Han Dong-won		(substituted on) 72'
FW	18	(South Korea) Cho Dong-geon		(substituted on) 63'
FW	20	(South Korea) Kim Jin-yong		(substituted on) 45'
Manager:
(South Korea) Shin Tae-yong

Man of the Match:
Eninho (Jeonbuk Hyundai Motors)

Assistant referees:
Won Chang-ho (South Korea)
Jung Hae-sang (South Korea)
Fourth official:
Ko Keum-bok (South Korea)

Jeonbuk Hyundai Motors won 3–1 on aggregate.

== Final table ==
Pos	Team	Qualification
1	Jeonbuk Hyundai Motors (C)	Qualification for the Champions League
2	Seongnam Ilhwa Chunma	Qualification for the Champions League
3	Pohang Steelers	Qualification for the Champions League
4	Jeonnam Dragons	
5	FC Seoul	
6	Incheon United	

Source: RSSSF
(C) Champions

== See also ==
- 2009 in South Korean football
- 2009 K League
