= 2004 Korean FA Cup =

2004 Hana Bank FA Cup

Tournament details
- Country: South Korea

Final positions
- Champions: Busan I'Cons (1st title)
- Runners-up: Bucheon SK

Tournament statistics
- Top goal scorer(s): Wang Jung-hyun; Jung Jo-gook (5 goals each)

Awards
- Best player: Kim Yong-dae

The 2004 Korean FA Cup, known as the 2004 Hana Bank FA Cup, was the ninth edition of the Korean FA Cup.

== Qualifying rounds ==
=== Playoff round ===
1 August	Ajou University	4–0	Pohang City	Paju NFC
	Kim Jae-sung 57', 90+1'; Choi Hyo-jin 73'; Kim Keun-seob 87'

1 August	Yongin City	3–0	Gwangju FC	Paju NFC
	Jeong Woon-ki 32', 68'; Kim Il-nam 77'

1 August	Hongik University	5–0	Kyongshin Cable	Paju NFC
	Lee Jin-seok 14', 20', 23'; Jang Hyo-deok 17'; Kim Young-jun 73'

8 August	Dong-Eui University	7–1	Guri EOS	Paju NFC
	Seo Ju-hong 15', 37', 42'; Park Chun-sin 23', 48'; Kim Woong-kwon 58'; Yang Sun-wook 62'		Jo Ju-nyun 89'

8 August	Jeonju University	4–0	Main Soccer	Paju NFC
	Jang Sung-ho 20'; Lee Sang-joon 58'; Kim Man-hee 65'; Lim Jeong-deok 73'

8 August	Hanmin University	3–2	Soccer Mania	Paju NFC
	Choi Kyung-joon 50'; Lee Byung-joon 85'; Park Ho-dong 88'		Jung Sang-nam 24'; Jeon Tae-hoon 90+1'

8 August	Kyungil University	0–3	JEI Education	Paju NFC
			Kwak Sang-yoon 6', 71'; Gong Jae-seob 52'

15 August	Yong In University	1–2	Paju Bumwoo	Paju NFC
	Kim Seon-young 51'		Park Byung-seon 13'; Yoon Gwang-seob 66' (o.g.)

15 August	Kyung Hee University	3–0	Bongshin Club	Paju NFC
	Kim Hyeok 51'; Kim Hyung-il 55'; Lee Tae-woo 75'

15 August	World Cyber College	2–2 (a.e.t.) (2–3 p)	Bundang Joma	Paju NFC
	Seo Won-joon 30'; Kang In-su 58'		Kim Seung-jun 14'; Jo Il-haeng 46'

15 August	Myongji University	1–0	Hyundai Cars	Paju NFC
	Lee Seung-hwan 80'

22 August	Gangneung City	4–0	Union	Paju NFC
	Lee Seung-won 20'; Jung Tae-ryung 55', 56'; Lim Da-han 64'

22 August	Gimpo Hallelujah	5–1	Sinu Club	Paju NFC
	Yoon Ha-ro 24', 66'; Lee Sung-kil 36', 67'; Song Dong-jun 41'		Kim Ki-jeong 74'

22 August	Hyundai Mipo Dockyard	5–1	Industrial Bank of Korea	Paju NFC
	Park Hee-wan 10'; Yang Ji-hoon 17'; Kim Young-ki 50', 63', 88'		Park Du-jeong 51'

22 August	Daejeon KHNP	5–0	Chungju Solveige	Paju NFC
	Kim Hong-ki 8'; Jeong Choong-jin 38'; Yoo Jin-o 57'; Kim Jung-hyun 85'; Nam Woong-ki 87'

== Final rounds ==
=== Bracket ===
First round
Bundang Joma	0
Ajou University	5
Jeonbuk Hyundai Motors	bye
—	—
Busan I'Cons	4
Hongik University	0
Suwon Samsung Bluewings (a.e.t.)	2
Jeonju University	1
Konkuk University	0
JEI Education	1
Gimpo Hallelujah	3
Daegu FC	1
Incheon United	1 (4)
Incheon Korea Railroad (p)	1 (5)
Ulsan Hyundai Horang-i	3
Gangneung City	1
Jeonnam Dragons	1
Hyundai Mipo Dockyard	0
Goyang KB Kookmin Bank	3
Hanmin University	1
Daejeon Citizen	4
Kyung Hee University	0
Seongnam Ilhwa Chunma	1
Suwon City	3
Yongin City	0
Gwangju Sangmu	9
FC Seoul	10
Paju Bumwoo	1
Dong-Eui University	1
Pohang Steelers	0
Bucheon SK	3
Myongji University	0

Round of 16
Ajou University	0
Jeonbuk Hyundai Motors	3
Busan I'Cons	2
Suwon Samsung Bluewings	1
JEI Education	1
Gimpo Hallelujah	3
Incheon Korea Railroad	2
Ulsan Hyundai Horang-i	5
Jeonnam Dragons	2
Goyang KB Kookmin Bank	0
Daejeon Citizen	2
Suwon City	0
Gwangju Sangmu	3
FC Seoul	2
Dong-Eui University	1
Bucheon SK (a.e.t.)	2

Quarter-finals
Jeonbuk Hyundai Motors	2 (5)
Busan I'Cons (p)	2 (6)
Gimpo Hallelujah	0
Ulsan Hyundai Horang-i	5
Jeonnam Dragons	0
Daejeon Citizen (a.e.t.)	1
Gwangju Sangmu	0
Bucheon SK	2

Semi-finals
23 December – Changwon
Busan I'Cons	5
Ulsan Hyundai Horang-i	1
23 December – Changwon
Daejeon Citizen	0 (2)
Bucheon SK (p)	0 (4)

Final
25 November – Changwon
Busan I'Cons (p)	1 (4)
Bucheon SK	1 (3)

=== First round ===
Daejeon KHNP withdrew from the competition, and Jeonbuk Hyundai Motors won by default.

14 December	Ajou University	5–0	Bundang Joma	Namhae Civil Stadium
	Choi Myung-sung 4'; Jo Yong-ki 22', 45+2', 52'; Ahn Jae-gon 65'

14 December	Hongik University	0–4	Busan I'Cons	Namhae Sports Park
			Noh Jung-yoon 33', 65'; Do Hwa-sung 44'; Adriano Magrão 61'

14 December	Suwon Samsung Bluewings	2–1 (a.e.t.)	Jeonju University	Namhae Sports Park
	Kim Ki-bum 50'; Yoon Hwa-pyung 100'		Lee Sang-keun 28'

14 December	Konkuk University	0–1	JEI Education	Tongyeong Stadium
			Choi Keun-jin 37'

14 December	Gimpo Hallelujah	3–1	Daegu FC	Tongyeong Stadium
	Lee Joo-sang 56'; Sung Ho-sang 82'; Kim Cheol-min 90+2'		Ha Eun-chul 87' (pen.)

14 December	Incheon United	1–1 (a.e.t.) (4–5 p)	Incheon Korea Railroad	Haman Stadium
	Seo Ki-bok 63'		Park Won-ha 87'

14 December	Gangneung City	1–3	Ulsan Hyundai Horang-i	Haman Stadium
	Jeong Sang-mo 66'		Mendes 17'; Yoo Kyoung-youl 27'; Kim Jin-yong 32'

14 December	Goyang KB Kookmin Bank	3–1	Hanmin University	Masan Stadium
	Kim Jae-gu 22'; Go Min-ki 29'; Kim Yoon-dong 87'		Baek Hyung-do 88'

14 December	Jeonnam Dragons	1–0	Hyundai Mipo Dockyard	Masan Stadium
	Kim Hong-cheol 88'

14 December	Kyung Hee University	0–4	Daejeon Citizen	Changwon Civil Stadium
			Luciano Valente 45'; Jang Hyun-kyu 76'; Alison 79', 83'

14 December	Seongnam Ilhwa Chunma	1–3	Suwon City	Changwon Civil Stadium
	Kim Do-hoon 78' (pen.)		Ko Jae-hyo 24'; Kim Han-won 59'; Lee Ki-bu 87'

14 December	Yongin City	0–9	Gwangju Sangmu	Yangsan Stadium
			Jeon Woo-keun 18'; Park Jung-hwan 22', 44'; Park Yun-hwa 31'; Oh Jung-seok 36', 52', 58'; Yoon Bo-young 62'; Han Jung-hwa 65'

14 December	FC Seoul	10–1	Paju Bumwoo	Yangsan Stadium
	Wang Jung-hyun 17', 39', 41', 45'; Jung Jo-gook 49', 54', 61', 73'; Lee Ji-nam 59', 65'		Park Jeong-seon 51'

14 December	Dong-Eui University	1–0	Pohang Steelers	Gimhae Stadium
	Tak Kyung-nam 64'

14 December	Bucheon SK	3–0	Myongji University	Gimhae Stadium
	Ko Ki-gu 16'; Kim Ki-hyung 30'; Cho Hyun-doo 32'

=== Round of 16 ===
16 December	Ajou University	0–3	Jeonbuk Hyundai Motors	Masan Stadium
			Rink 9'; Roma 65'; Botti 76'

16 December	Busan I'Cons	2–1	Suwon Samsung Bluewings	Masan Stadium
	Lee Jung-hyo 16'; Han Jae-woong 41'		Yoon Hwa-pyung 43'

16 December	JEI Education	1–3	Gimpo Hallelujah	Tongyeong Stadium
	Gong Jae-sub 3'		Yoon Ha-ro 2'; Kim Cheol-min 46'; Sung Ho-sang 75'

16 December	Incheon Korea Railroad	2–5	Ulsan Hyundai Horang-i	Tongyeong Stadium
	Lee Gwang-jin 66', 80'		Park Jin-seop 13'; Kim Jin-yong 22', 46'; Choi Sung-kuk 51'; Jang Sang-won 86'

16 December	Goyang KB Kookmin Bank	0–2	Jeonnam Dragons	Changwon Civil Stadium
			Mota 56' (pen.); Ju Kwang-youn 90+1'

16 December	Daejeon Citizen	2–0	Suwon City	Changwon Civil Stadium
	Jang Chul-woo 47' (pen.); Gong O-kyun 72'

16 December	Gwangju Sangmu	3–2	FC Seoul	Gimhae Stadium
	Kim Seung-hyun 18'; Park Jung-hwan 27'; Park Yun-hwa 28'		Wang Jung-hyun 4'; Jung Jo-gook 62'

16 December	Dong-Eui University	1–2 (a.e.t.)	Bucheon SK	Gimhae Stadium
	Seo Ju-hong 66' (pen.)		Cho Hyun-doo 20'; Boris 92'

=== Quarter-finals ===
21 December	Jeonbuk Hyundai Motors	2–2 (a.e.t.) (5–6 p)	Busan I'Cons	Masan Stadium
	Roma 85'; Jung Jong-kwan 89'		Do Hwa-sung 5'; Park Choong-kyun 52'
	Penalties
	Roma (penalty scored); Chu Woon-ki (penalty missed); Botti (penalty scored); Jung Jong-kwan (penalty missed); Rink (penalty scored); Kim Hyun-su (penalty scored); Choi Jin-cheul (penalty scored); Yoon Jung-hwan (penalty missed)		(penalty scored) Park Choong-kyun; (penalty scored) Bae Hyo-sung; (penalty scored) Do Hwa-sung; (penalty missed) Kim Tae-min; (penalty missed) Ahn Hyo-yeon; (penalty scored) Kim Jae-young; (penalty scored) Lee Jung-hyo; (penalty scored) Shin Young-rok

21 December	Gimpo Hallelujah	0–5	Ulsan Hyundai Horang-i	Masan Stadium
			Choi Sung-kuk 16'; Yoo Kyoung-youl 18'; Lee Jin-ho 31', 52'; Kim Jin-yong 58'

21 December	Jeonnam Dragons	0–1 (a.e.t.)	Daejeon Citizen	Changwon Civil Stadium
			Luciano Valente 119'

21 December	Gwangju Sangmu	0–2	Bucheon SK	Changwon Civil Stadium
			Kim Ki-hyung 26'; Choi Chul-woo 46'

=== Semi-finals ===
23 December	Busan I'Cons	5–1	Ulsan Hyundai Horang-i	Changwon Civil Stadium
	Ahn Hyo-yeon 43', 83', 87', 90+2'; Adriano Magrão 74'		Choi Sung-kuk 66'

23 December	Daejeon Citizen	0–0 (a.e.t.) (2–4 p)	Bucheon SK	Changwon Civil Stadium
	Penalties
	Jang Chul-woo (penalty scored); Kang Jung-hoon (penalty scored); Luciano Valente (penalty missed); Lee Chang-yeob (penalty missed)		(penalty scored) Cho Hyun-doo; (penalty scored) Kim Han-yoon; (penalty scored) Choi Chul-woo; (penalty missed) Byun Jae-seob; (penalty scored) Yoon Yong-gu

=== Final ===
25 December	Bucheon SK	1–1 (a.e.t.) (3–4 p)	Busan I'Cons	Changwon Civil Stadium
	Byun Jae-sub 6'		Adriano Magrão 5'
	Penalties
	Cho Hyun-doo (penalty scored); Kim Han-yoon (penalty scored); Yoon Yong-goo (penalty missed); Boris (penalty missed); Kim Ki-hyung (penalty scored)		(penalty scored) Adriano Magrão; (penalty missed) Bae Hyo-sung; (penalty scored) Do Hwa-sung; (penalty scored) Park Sang-sin; (penalty scored) Yoon Hee-jun

== Awards ==
Award	Winner	Team
Most Valuable Player	(South Korea) Kim Yong-dae	Busan I'Cons
Top goalscorer	(South Korea) Wang Jung-hyun	FC Seoul
Top goalscorer	(South Korea) Jung Jo-gook	FC Seoul
Best Manager	(Scotland) Ian Porterfield	Busan I'Cons
Fair Play Award	Bucheon SK	

== See also ==
- 2004 K League
- 2004 K2 League
- 2004 Korean League Cup
