= Jun-young =

- Hangul: 준영
- RR: Junyeong
- MR: Chunyŏng

Jun-young, also spelled Joon-young, is a Korean given name. It was the tenth-most popular name for baby boys in South Korea in 1980, rising to sixth place by 1990.

== People ==
=== Entertainers ===
- Park Junyoung (born 1987), South Korean singer in Japan
- Nucksal (born Lee Jun-yeong, 1987), South Korean rapper
- Seo Jun-young (born Kim Sang-gu, 1987), South Korean actor
- Jung Joon-young (born 1989), South Korean rock singer
- Lee Jun-young (entertainer) (born 1997), South Korean singer, member of boy band U-KISS
- Profit (gamer) (born Park Joon-yeong, 1999), South Korean Overwatch player

=== Sportspeople ===
- Lee Jun-yeong (fl. 1948), South Korean basketball player
- Bang Jun-yeong (born 1965), South Korean swimmer
- Lee Jun-young (footballer) (born 1982), South Korean football forward
- Yoo Joon-young (born 1990), South Korean football midfielder
- Jang Jun-young (born 1993), South Korean football defender (K-League Challenge)
- Kim Jun-young (footballer) (born 1999), South Korean football midfielder (Belarusian Premier League)

=== Other ===
- Kim Jun-young (born 1951), South Korean economist
- June-Young Soh (born 1965), South Korean musical director
- Park Jun-young (government official, born 1967), South Korean Deputy Minister of Oceans and Fisheries since 2020
- Ki Jun-young (born 1972), South Korean female writer

== Fictional characters ==
- Park Jun-yeong, from the 2017 television series Prison Playbook
- Do Joon-young, from the 2018 television series My Mister
- Oh Jun-yeong, from the 2023 thriller film Unlocked

== See also ==
- List of Korean given names
