= Lee Jun-young (disambiguation) =

Lee Jun-young (Korean: 이준영) is a Korean name consisting of the family name Lee and the given name Jun-young, and may also refer to:

- Lee Jun-yeong (fl. 1948), South Korean basketball player
- Lee Jun-young (footballer) (born 1982), South Korean footballer
- Lee Jun-young (born 1997), South Korean actor and singer
