= Lee Jung-hyo =

South Korean footballer

Personal information
- Full name: Lee Jung-hyo
- Date of birth: 23 July 1975 (age 51)
- Place of birth: Gunsan, South Korea
- Height: 1.76 m (5 ft 9 in)
- Positions: Full-back; midfielder

Team information
- Current team: Suwon Samsung Bluewings (head coach)

College career
Years	Team	Apps	(Gls)
- Ajou University

Senior career*
Years	Team	Apps	(Gls)
1999–2008	Busan IPark	165	(10)

Managerial career
- 2011–2012: Ajou University (assistant)
- 2012–2014: Ajou University
- 2016–2017: Gwangju FC (assistant)
- 2018–2019: Seongnam FC (assistant)
- 2020–2021: Jeju United (assistant)
- 2022–2025: Gwangju FC
- 2026–: Suwon Samsung Bluewings
- * Club domestic league appearances and goals

- Lee Jung-hyo
- Hangul: 이정효
- Hanja: 李正孝
- RR: I Jeonghyo
- MR: I Chŏnghyo

Lee Jung-hyo (born 23 July 1975) is a South Korean football manager and former player. He is a one-club man of K League club Busan IPark, who experienced all three of the club's eras, namely the Daewoo, I'Cons and IPark eras, between 1999 and 2008. He is the current head coach of K League 2 club Suwon Samsung Bluewings.

== Playing career ==
After graduating from high school in Gunsan, Jeonbuk, Lee entered Ajou University, sponsored by K League club Daewoo Royals. In 1997, he captained the university's football club to win the autumn season of the National University Football League and was named the tournament's Most Valuable Player. However, he suffered a knee injury in November, and was not picked in the next year's K League draft. He concentrated on his recovery after joining the reserve team of Busan Daewoo Royals (renamed Busan I'Cons in 2000 and Busan IPark in 2005). He started to play for the club's senior team in the second half of the 1999 season, and succeeded in signing for the senior team in 2000.

Lee once again left the field due to an Achilles tendon injury in the middle of the 2000 season, and became the club's main player since 2001. On 11 July 2002, he scored his first goal for Busan in a 3–1 win over Seongnam Ilhwa Chunma. On 25 December 2004, he played as a starter in the Korean FA Cup final, where Busan beat Bucheon SK 4–3 on penalties, helping the club win their first-ever FA Cup title. On 22 January 2007, he signed a 10-year contract extension with Busan, which ensured his coaching career after retirement, deciding to become Busan's one-club man. On 11 August 2007, he reached his 200th appearance for Busan in a 3–0 win over Gwangju Sangmu, receiving a memorial tablet from the club. He captained the club during the 2008 season, his last season as a player.

== Managerial career ==
=== Ajou University ===
After retiring as a player, Lee decided to leave Busan IPark. He returned to his alma mater Ajou University as an assistant coach in 2011, and was promoted to manager after Ha Seok-ju, his superior and predecessor, left for K League club Jeonnam Dragons in August 2012. After managing Ajou for two and a half years, he also joined Jeonnam Dragons as a coach in December 2014, but could not be reunited with Ha, who resigned from Jeonnam in the previous month.

Between 2016 and 2021, Lee worked as assistant coach to Nam Ki-il at Gwangju FC, Seongnam FC and Jeju United. He contributed to Seongnam's and Jeju's promotions to the K League 1.

=== Gwangju FC ===
==== 2022 season ====
On 28 December 2021, he officially took over managerial position of Gwangju FC, which was relegated to the K League 2, coming back to them. On 19 February 2022, he made his managerial debut in Gwangju's league opener against Gimpo FC, which ended in a 2–1 loss. On 27 February, his team defeated Daejeon Hana Citizen 2–0 in his second match, achieving his first win. On 23 April, Gwangju defeated another favorite Bucheon FC 1995 1–0, becoming the league leaders. On 27 April, the club recorded a shock 6–1 win against K League 1 club Incheon United in a Korean FA Cup match. After showing this upturn, he received the K League Manager of the Month award for April. On 3 September, in a league match against Gimpo FC, he changed three players on the field when his team were trailing 1–0 with less than 20 minutes left. The three substitutes were directly involved in the team's two goals in stoppage time, converting opponents' lead into a dramatic 2–1 win. In his first professional season as a manager, he brought Gwangju a league trophy as well as promotion. He was named the K League 2 Manager of the Year at the league's awards ceremony.

==== 2023 season ====
On 18 January 2023, Gwangju extended their contract with Lee until 2024. The club also recruited several newcomers in the winter transfer window to compete with K League 1 teams, but their squad, who were receiving the league's lowest wage, were evaluated as the weakest squad prior to the start of the 2023 season. During the season, he frequently expressed his feelings without hesitation in the stadium and interviews with media, attracting a lot of interests or controversies. On 5 March, after losing 2–0 to FC Seoul in Gwangju's first home match, he said at a press conference, "I am angry to have lost to a team that plays football like that." His remark antagonised Seoul players and fans, and he apologised to Seoul manager An Ik-soo the next day. On 7 July, after a 1–1 draw with Gangwon FC, he blamed opponents that they tried to halt the match several times and did not have the attitude as a professional team. In addition, he declared that his team would play without manners in future. However, the halts were caused by collisions between players, and the player who received a yellow card for time wasting was Gwangju goalkeeper Lee Jun. He was criticised for his selfish claim and lack of safety awareness by the press and opposing manager Yoon Jong-hwan. On 25 September, after a 1–0 loss to Jeonbuk Hyundai Motors, he asked journalists "How much is Petrescu's salary? I am really curious.", taking a dig at Jeonbuk manager Dan Petrescu. Despite these controversies, Gwangju finished third at the league under his guidance, qualifying for the AFC Champions League Elite for the first time. On 13 December, the club extended their contract with him until 2027, and promised him new training facilities just for their players.

==== 2024 season ====
During the 2024 season, Lee had difficulty maintaining steady results. Gwangju's key player Jasir Asani failed to control his weight, and another key player Eom Ji-sung transferred to EFL Championship club Swansea City in the summer. Lee also modified his tactics because the quality of grass at the home stadium deteriorated. While having a tough time, he caused other controversies by showing unexpected behaviors. On 3 April 2024, he suddenly removed club supporters' banner in the middle of the match against Incheon United, embarrassing the club's fans and staffs. When the controversy grew, he met a representative of the supporters club and apologised to the representative. On 25 May, after a 1–1 draw with Incheon, he was suspected of shouting abuse at opposing striker Stefan Mugoša at the end of the match. He then had a quarrel with journalists after giving them half-hearted answers during a press conference. Mugoša did not reveal what Lee had said to him, but advised Lee to teach players respect regardless of win or lose. The K League Federation gave Lee a warning after receiving explanations from Gwangju. Lee's team finished ninth at the K League 1, whereas they became the only K League team to advance to the knockout stage at the Champions League Elite, where Asani regained his capability.

==== 2025 season ====
In December 2024, Lee was nominated for a new manager of the same league's club Jeonbuk, but the negotiation with them was cancelled by their preference for foreign managers. Jeonbuk eventually appointed Uruguayan manager Gus Poyet as their new manager.

In the round of 16 of the Champions League Elite, Gwangju defeated J1 League champions Vissel Kobe 3–2 on aggregate, overcoming a 2–0 first-leg loss. They then met Saudi Pro League club Al-Hilal, evaluated as the most valuable club outside the Big Five at the time, in the quarter-finals. In an interview before the match, Lee said his team should pay more attention to Al-Hilal's native players than their well-known foreign players. Lee's interview, which focused on Saudi players, was negatively interpreted by opposing manager Jorge Jesus, whose team revolved around numerous foreign players. In the match, Gwangju, who used three foreign players, suffered a 7–0 defeat to Al-Hilal, who used two native players. After the end of the match, Jesus made a gesture of ridicule in front of Lee to criticise Lee's remark instead of offering a handshake. Lee said he did not understand Jesus' gesture.

Gwangju finished seventh at the league, and reached the final at the Korea Cup (formerly known as Korean FA Cup). In the Korea Cup final against Poyet's Jeonbuk, Lee was sent off for complaining to the referee strongly in the middle of the first half, and his team lost 2–1 after extra time.

== Style of management ==
Lee has attached importance to learning trendy tactics. Inspired by Roberto De Zerbi and Pep Guardiola, he has tried to instil movements which are both fluid and systematic during the build-up play into his team. For example, his central midfielder comes down to the defensive line when his centre-back advances to be involved in the build-up play, and his striker moves to midfield when a numerical advantage is needed there before his team advance to opponents' box. During the attack, his midfielders and forwards move freely to keep the opposing defenders in check. If the flank or the half-space is opened in the meantime, his winger or central midfielder constantly penetrates into the open space. At the same time, wing-backs move to midfield to circulate the ball or to hedge against opponents' counterattack.

Lee's team begin their pressing on the flank. His players wait in each position when the opposing goalkeeper or centre-back catches the ball, but his wing-back trys forechecking when the ball is passed to the flank. At this time, his central midfielders also advance and block pass routes. During training, he mainly points out players' movements and locations, and is not sensitive about inaccurate ball controls and passes.

Lee is nicknamed the "Korean Mourinho" instead of his role models by his volatile remarks.

== Career statistics ==
Appearances and goals by club, season and competition
Club	Season	League			National cup		League cup		Continental		Other		Total	
Club	Season	Division	Apps	Goals	Apps	Goals	Apps	Goals	Apps	Goals	Apps	Goals	Apps	Goals
Busan IPark	1999	K League	10	0	?	?	0	0	? (Note: Appearances in Asian Club Championship or AFC Champions League)	?	5 (Note: Appearances in K League Championship)	0	15	0
Busan IPark	2000	K League	4	0	?	?	5	0	—		—		9	0
Busan IPark	2001	K League	22	0	?	?	0	0	—		—		22	0
Busan IPark	2002	K League	25	2	?	?	7	0	—		—		32	2
Busan IPark	2003	K League	19	0	1	0	—		—		—		20	0
Busan IPark	2004	K League	14	2	5	1	8	1	—		—		27	4
Busan IPark	2005	K League	20	1	1	0	11	1	?	?	1	0	33	2
Busan IPark	2006	K League	19	3	2	0	9	0	—		—		30	3
Busan IPark	2007	K League	24	2	3	0	8	1	—		—		35	3
Busan IPark	2008	K League	8	0	1	0	3	0	—		—		12	0
Career total			165	10	13	1	51	3	?	?	6	0	235	14

== Managerial statistics ==
As of match played 1 March 2025

Managerial record by team and tenure
Team	From	To	Record					Ref.
Team	From	To	Pld	W	D	L	Win %	Ref.
Gwangju FC	28 December 2021	21 December 2025	137	66	32	39	48.18	
Suwon Samsung Bluewings	23 December 2025	Present	0	0	0	0	—	
Total			137	66	32	39	48.18	

== Honours ==
=== Player ===
Busan IPark

- Korean FA Cup: 2004

=== Manager ===
Gwangju FC

- K League 2: 2022
- Korea Cup runner-up: 2025

Suwon Samsung Bluewings

- K League 2: 2026

Individual

- K League Manager of the Month: April 2022, September 2022, June 2023
- K League 2 Manager of the Year: 2022
- Korean FA Coach of the Year: 2025
