= Fontanarosa (surname) =

Fontanarosa is an Italian surname from Campania, derived from the town of Fontanarosa. Notable people with the surname include:

- Alessandro Fontanarosa (born 2003), Italian professional footballer
- Dario Fontanarosa, former chairman of Adelaide United FC
- Lucien Fontanarosa (1912–1975), French painter
- Patrice Fontanarosa (born 1942), French classical violinist
