= Kim Seung-hyun =

Kim Seung-hyun (Korean: 김승현) is a Korean name consisting of the family name Kim and the given name Seung-hyun, and may also refer to:

- Kim Seung-hyun (television host) (born 1960), South Korean television host
- Kim Seung-hyun (basketball) (born 1978 Nov 23), South Korean basketball player
- Kim Seung-hyun (actor 1978) (born 1978 Sep 22 ), South Korean basketball player
- Kim Seung-hyun (footballer) (born 1979), South Korean footballer
- Kim Seung-hyun (actor) (born 1981), South Korean actor
