= Jung Sung-ryong =

South Korean footballer (born 1985)

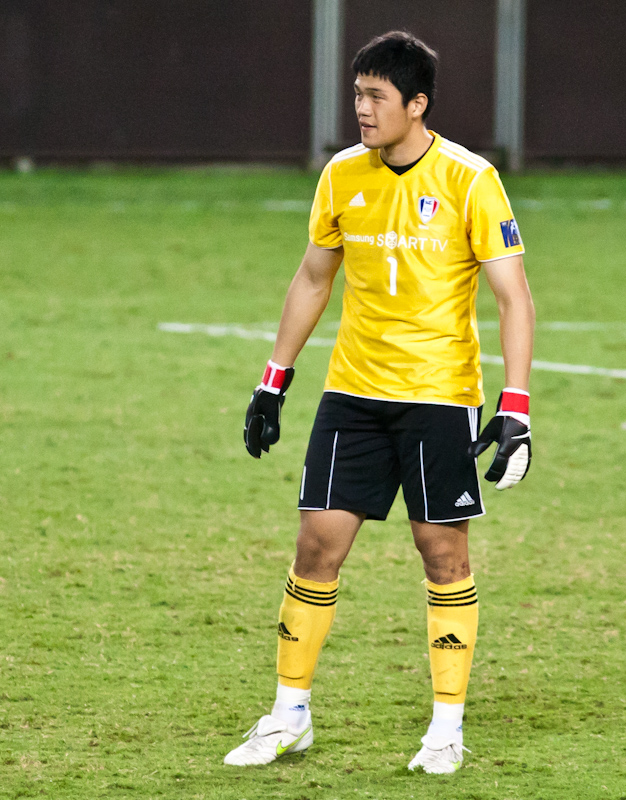
- Jung with Suwon Samsung Bluewings in 2011

Personal information
- Full name: Jung Sung-ryong
- Date of birth: 4 January 1985 (age 41)
- Place of birth: Seongnam, Gyeonggi, South Korea
- Height: 1.91 m (6 ft 3 in)
- Position: Goalkeeper

Team information
- Current team: Fukushima United
- Number: 78

Youth career
- 1997–1999: Gwangju Middle School
- 2000–2002: Seogwipo High School
- 2003–2006: Pohang Steelers

Senior career*
Years	Team	Apps	(Gls)
2006–2007	Pohang Steelers	29	(0)
2008–2011	Seongnam Ilhwa Chunma	86	(0)
2011–2015	Suwon Samsung Bluewings	150	(0)
2016–2025	Kawasaki Frontale	273	(0)
2026–	Fukushima United	11	(0)

International career
2005	South Korea U20	5	(0)
2007–2012	South Korea U23	25 (Note: Includes seven appearances as an overage player (five appearances in Summer Olympics, two appearances in friendlies).)	(1)
2008–2016	South Korea	67	(0)
Medal record
Representing South Korea
Men's football
Olympic Games
Bronze medal – third place	2012 London	Team
AFC Asian Cup
Silver medal – second place	2015 Australia	Team
Bronze medal – third place	2007 Indonesia/Malaysia /Thailand/Vietnam	Team
Bronze medal – third place	2011 Qatar	Team
EAFF Championship
Gold medal – first place	2008 China	Team
Bronze medal – third place	2013 South Korea	Team
- * Club domestic league appearances and goals as of 25 August 2026

- Jung Sung-ryong
- Hangul: 정성룡
- Hanja: 鄭成龍
- RR: Jeong Seongryong
- MR: Chŏng Sŏngnyong

Jung Sung-ryong (Korean: 정성룡; Korean pronunciation: [tɕʌŋ.sʌŋ.njoŋ]; born 4 January 1985) is a South Korean professional footballer who currently plays as a goalkeeper for J3 League club Fukushima United.

== Early life ==
Jung was born in Seongnam, Gyeonggi, and grew up in Gwangju. Jung began playing football when his father gave him a football in the second grade of elementary school. When Jung was in the fifth grade, his school's football club was founded, and he started his football career. Initially playing as a sweeper, he switched his role to goalkeeper in the middle school.

Jung joined Seogwipo High School in Seogwipo, Jeju, after graduating from Gwangju Middle School. In the high school tournament of the 2002 Korean National Sports Festival, he played for Jeju's provincial team, and won the title.

== Club career ==
=== Pohang Steelers ===
In January 2003, Jung signed his first professional contract with Pohang Steelers. During the first three years in Pohang, he failed to make any appearances for club's senior team due to becoming an understudy to first-choice goalkeeper Kim Byung-ji. Because of Kim's existence, Jung had thoughts of performing military duties, but was talked out of it by reserve team coach Park Tae-ha, who told he would get his chance.

Jung started to compete with Shin Hwa-yong for the role as a starter since the 2006 season after Kim left Pohang. He made his senior debut and kept his first clean sheet in a 1–0 victory against Gyeongnam FC on 22 April 2006. Since making his debut, he finally started to play for the first team. In the 2006 K League, (including the 2006 Korean League Cup) Jung conceded 27 goals during 26 appearances, while Shin conceded 21 goals during 13 appearances.

In the 2007 regular season, Pohang preferred Shin to Jung who had to commit to the national under-23 team. Nevertheless, Pohang trusted Jung with their goalpost in the K League Championship and the Korean FA Cup. He helped his team to win the K League title, and reach the FA Cup Final.

=== Seongnam Ilhwa Chunma ===
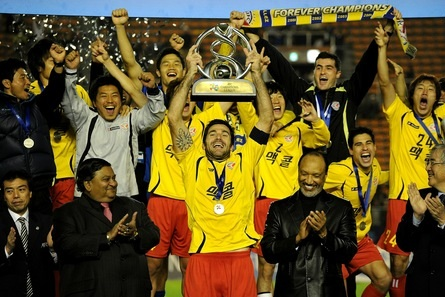
Jung celebrating Seongnam Ilhwa Chunma's 2010 AFC Champions League title with his teammates.

In February 2008 after Kim Yong-dae enlisted in Gwangju Sangmu, Seongnam Ilhwa Chunma scouted Jung to replace Kim. Jung attempted to negotiate with Pohang, but left the club with a year left on his contract.

Jung played as the first-choice goalkeeper for Seongnam. Seongnam conceded the least goals in the 2008 regular season due to his immediate effect.

He still kept his place as a starter after Kim returned from Sangmu in 2009. He left a memorable game by changing his role to an outfield player just before the penalty shoot-out in the 2009 K League Championship. He missed Seongnam's third shot in the shoot-out, but they won the game.

While contributing to winning the 2010 AFC Champions League title, he played all twelve matches from the group stage to the final and kept five clean sheets. He also participated in the 2010 FIFA Club World Cup making 3 appearances in the tournament.

=== Suwon Samsung Bluewings ===
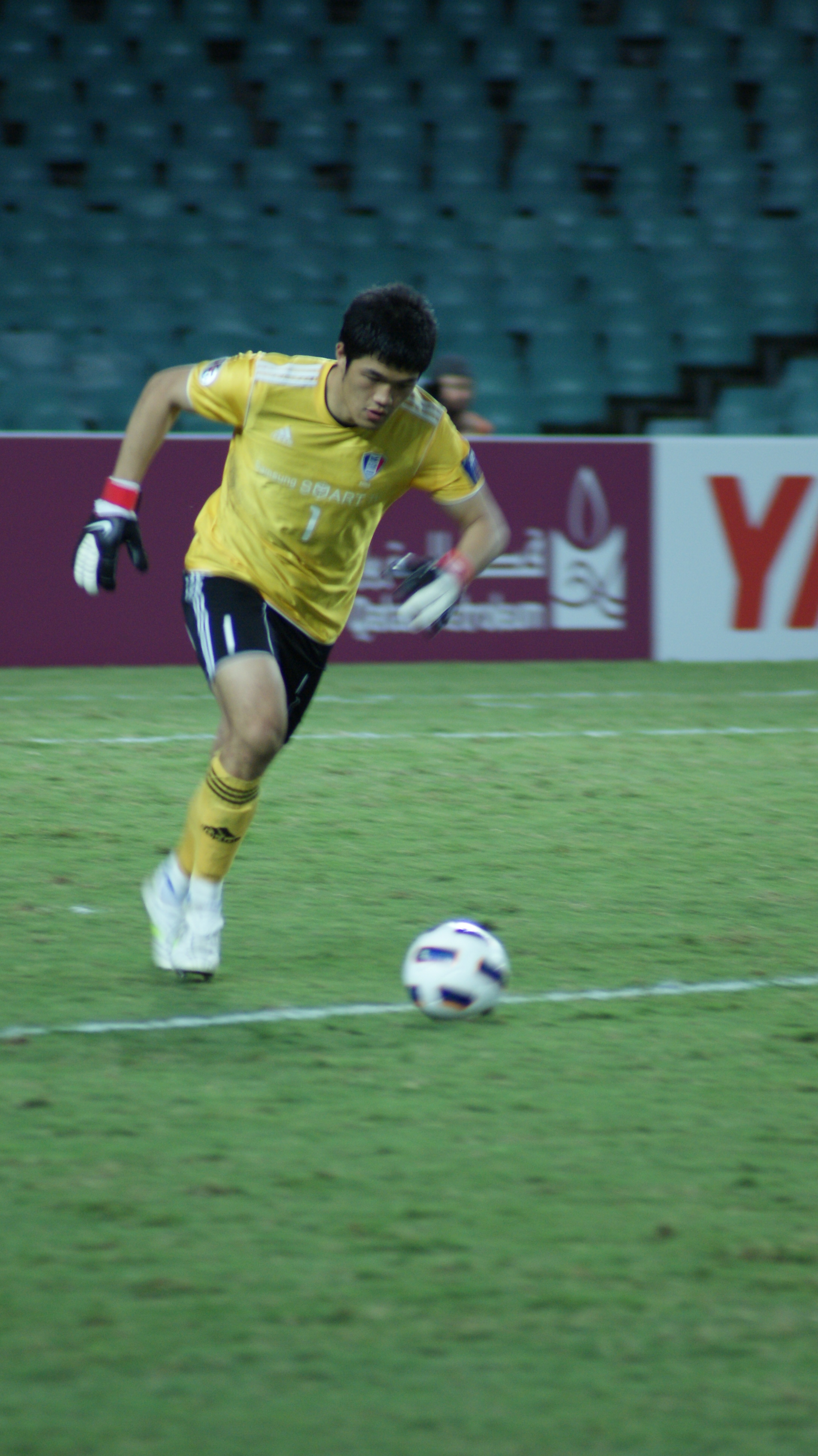
Jung playing for Suwon Samsung Bluewings in 2011.

On 28 January 2011, it was announced that Jung had joined Suwon Samsung Bluewings on a five-year deal for undisclosed fee. Jeonbuk Hyundai Motors was also interested in him, but he chose Suwon.

Jung met his former club Seongnam in the 2011 Korean FA Cup Final, and lost to them.

Jung experienced an unpleasant damage in the 2011 AFC Champions League semi-final first leg against Al-Sadd. In the middle of the match, the play had been suspended due to an injured player, and the ball was being moved to Jung to resume play after the end of the situation. However, Al-Sadd striker Mamadou Niang suddenly intercepted the ball in front of Jung and scored the discourteous goal. Jung kept a clean sheet in the second leg, but Suwon lost 2–1 on aggregate due to the controversial goal.

Jung couldn't play for Suwon for two months while playing as an over-aged player for the national under-23 team in the 2012 Summer Olympics. After the end of the 2012 season, he was nominated for the K League FANtastic Player award, but lost to Dejan Damjanović.

In a K League match against Pohang on 10 November 2013, Jung made a mistake which seriously injured his reputation. He blocked an opponent's shot, but smashed the ball into the net with his hand after losing his balance. He was criticised for his action redolent of the slam dunk.

During the 2014 K League 1, Jung showed outstanding performances, helping his team to finish runners-up. He was named Suwon's Player of the Month for April, and K League Player of the Week in the 30th round. In the middle of the season, some British clubs including Queens Park Rangers, Fulham and Celtic were interested in Jung, but he failed to leave for Europe.

In the 2015 season, he had difficulty in playing all of Suwon's matches due to his knee injury, and second-choice goalkeeper No Dong-geon got a considerable number of opportunities.

=== Kawasaki Frontale ===
It was announced on 24 December 2015 that Jung would join J1 League side Kawasaki Frontale on 2 February 2016.

Jung kept a clean sheet in his first J1 League match, but he scored an own goal when missing his ball due to a collision with opponent striker Thiago Quirino in the next match against Shonan Bellmare. Jung lost concentration after the collision wasn't recognised as Quirino's foul. He conceded three more goals, and Kawasaki drew 4–4 with Shonan. After suffering a knee injury in mid–September 2016, Jung returned to the field in an Emperor's Cup match against Urawa Red Diamonds on 12 November. He blocked Zlatan Ljubijankić's shot in the penalty shoot-out after a 3–3 draw with Urawa, helping Kawasaki advance to the next round. At the end of his first season with Kawasaki, they finished runners-up in the 2016 J1 League and the 2016 Emperor's Cup.

Jung was selected as Kawasaki's vice-captain ahead of his second season in Japan. His first match in the 2017 season was a Champions League match against his former club Suwon and his former rival Shin Hwa-yong. The match ended in a 1-1 draw after he conceded his teammate's own goal. He once again met Suwon and Shin in an away match, and defeated them by keeping a clean sheet. He captained the club for the first time in a J1 League match against Ventforet Kofu on 8 April 2017. Kawasaki won their first-ever J1 League title in this season.

Jung received a red card for the first time in his career during a 2–0 loss against Urawa on 2 May 2018. The defender Tatsuki Nara wore gloves for the rest of the time after Jung was sent off for a foul on opponent forward Andrew Nabbout in the 70th minute, because Kawasaki already used three substitutes. Kawasaki conceded the least goals in the 2018 J1 League due to Jung's performances, winning the second consecutive title. He was selected for the J.League Best XI in 2018.

In the 2019 Japanese Super Cup, he kept a clean sheet, helping his team win a 1–0 victory over Urawa. However, Jung lost his place to Shota Arai during the last two months in the 2019 season.

Jung signed a contract extension with Kawasaki ahead of the 2020 season, although his status was unstable last season. He repaid their faith, leading them to the third J1 League title and the first Emperor's Cup title. He was once again selected for the J.League Best XI.

After a friendly against Paris Saint-Germain on 20 July 2022, Jung was evaluated as a masterclass goalkeeper by opponents' website, although his team lost 2–1.

In a friendly against Bayern Munich on 29 July 2023, Jung played for 45 minutes and conceded no goals. He also met Kim Min-jae, his countryman who played for Bayern, in the match. In the 2023 Emperor's Cup final against Kashiwa Reysol on 9 December, Jung did not concede a goal while facing Kashiwa's 19 shots for 120 minutes, and led his team to a 8–7 penalty win by scoring the decisive penalty himself and saving opponent goalkeeper's penalty.

With new manager Shigetoshi Hasebe being appointed, Jung was then drop as a second choice goalkeeper from the 2025 season onwards where Louis Thébault-Yamaguchi. Jung went on to make a total of 7 appearance in the 2025 season with his last appearances for the club was in a league match against Sanfrecce Hiroshima on 30 November 2025.

=== Fukushima United ===
After 9 years with Kawasaki Frontale, Jung left the club to signed with J3 League club Fukushima United on 12 January 2026. He make his debut on 7 February 2026 against Ventforet Kofu.

== International career ==
=== Early career ===
In July 2006, Jung was called up to the South Korea national football team for the first time. He was also selected for the national team for the 2007 AFC Asian Cup, but sat on the bench throughout the tournament. He made his senior international debut in a 1–0 friendly defeat against Chile on 30 January 2008.

Jung conceded only three goals in ten qualifiers of the 2008 Summer Olympics, leading South Korea to qualify for the competition. He scored 85-meter (93-yard) goal in an under-23 friendly against Ivory Coast on 27 July 2008 just before the Olympics, holding the world record until Everton keeper Tim Howard scored 93-meter (101-yard) goal in the 2011–12 Premier League. Jung played all three matches in the Olympics, but South Korea was eliminated in the group stage.

=== 2010 FIFA World Cup ===
Jung became the successor to Lee Woon-jae prior to the 2010 FIFA World Cup. In a friendly against Spain just before the World Cup, he conceded only one goal and won praise for his performance.

Jung kept a clean sheet in his first World Cup match against Greece, although he was disturbed by the strong sunlight. He conceded four goals including his teammate's own goal in the next match against Argentina, but he was praised for blocking eight shots from Argentine players.

However, his mistake against Uruguay in the round of 16 brought tears to his eyes. After his incorrect prediction about a cross from Diego Forlán, he went out of the goalpost and failed to intercept the ball. He could only watch as Luis Suárez kicked the ball into the empty goal. South Korea lost 2–1 after Suárez scored another goal. Nevertheless, he, along with Lee Chung-yong and Park Ji-sung, were voted South Korea's MVP in the World Cup by fans.

=== 2011 Asian Cup ===
Jung played all six of South Korea's matches in the 2011 AFC Asian Cup. In the semi-final match against Japan, Jung saved a penalty from Keisuke Honda, but Hajime Hosogai who moved into the penalty area before Honda kicked the penalty scored a controversial goal from the rebound. South Korea had to have the penalty shoot-out after drawing 2–2 due to the misfortune. In the shoot-out, Jung failed to save all three of Japan's shots, and South Korea lost 3–0. South Korea finished third after defeating Uzbekistan in the third place match.

=== 2012 Summer Olympics ===
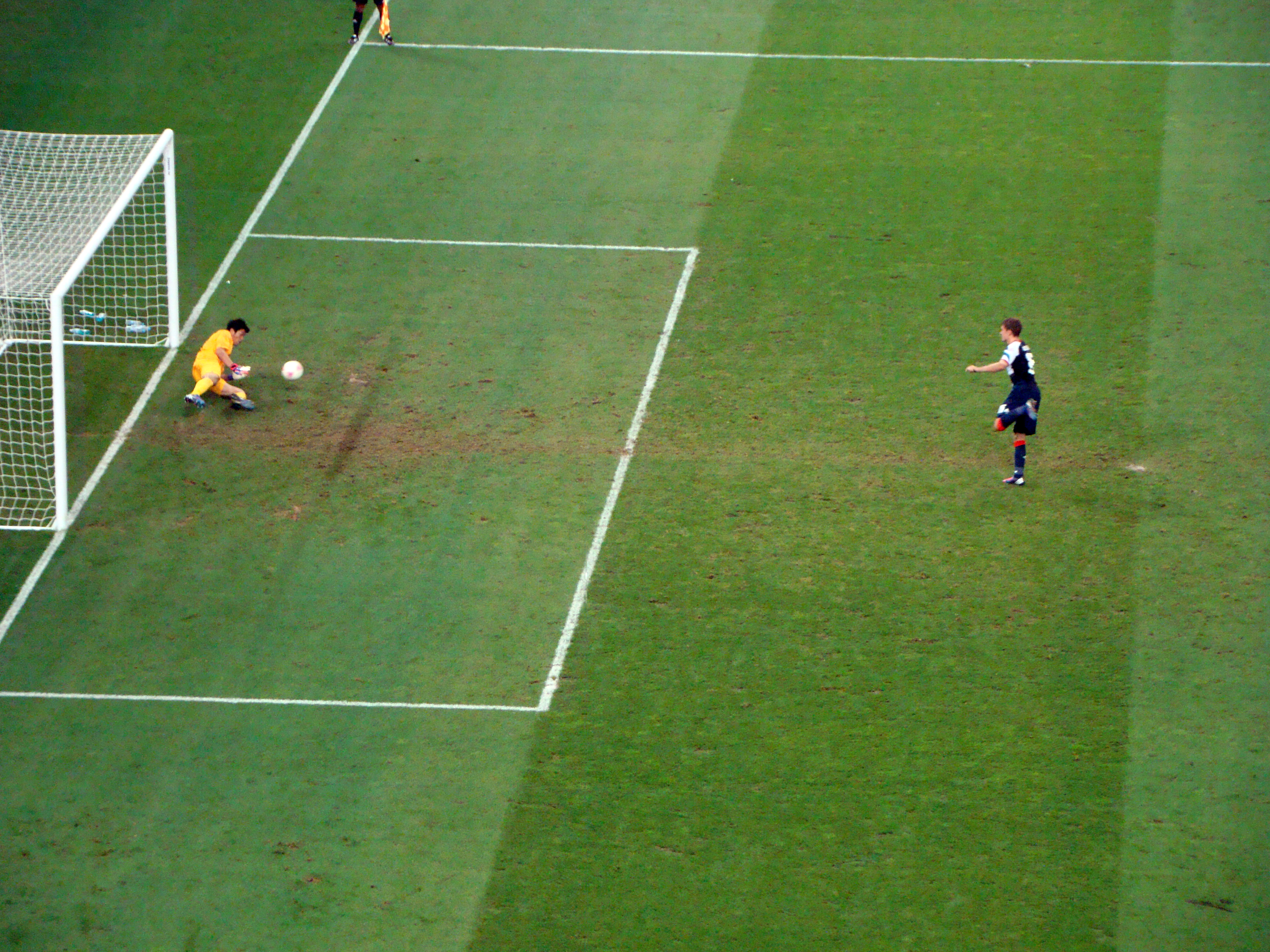
Jung saving a penalty from Aaron Ramsey during the Olympic match against Great Britain.

Jung was selected as an over-aged player for South Korean under-23 team for the 2012 Summer Olympics. South Korea met Great Britain in the quarter-finals after Jung conceded just one goal in three group matches. South Korea encountered crisis by giving two penalty chances to Aaron Ramsey in the first half, but Jung blocked one of the two. However, Jung was injured in a collision with Micah Richards in the middle of the second half, and was replaced by Lee Bum-young. Lee conceded three goals in the semi-final defeat to Brazil while Jung was absent from the team due to a shoulder injury. Jung was forced to play the bronze medal match against Japan and kept a clean sheet. He conceded two goals in five matches during the tournament, playing a vital role in Korean football's first-ever Olympic medal.

=== 2014 World Cup ===
Jung played all qualifiers of the 2014 FIFA World Cup, but he had to compete with Kim Seung-gyu for appearances in the World Cup after South Korea qualified for the tournament. Hong Myung-bo who used Jung in the 2012 Summer Olympics once again trusted him despite his slump in friendlies just before the World Cup.

Jung saved nine of Russia's ten shots on target in South Korea's first match, gaining respect from the press. However, he conceded four goals in the next match against Algeria, and was criticised for his worst performance. He was replaced by Kim in the last game against Belgium, and South Korea was eliminated in the group stage.

After the 2014 World Cup, Jung was named in the national team for the 2015 AFC Asian Cup, but couldn't play any match in the Asian Cup.

== Personal life ==
Jung has one sister, who is one year older than him. When he was fifteen year old, his father died at age 59 and said his father's death affected him. In December 2008, Jung married Lim Ji-jeong, Gyeongnam's winner in the Miss Korea 2006. The couple have two sons and two daughters. Upon moving to Japan, Jung began settling in the country with his family and learning the Japanese language.

Jung has a tattoo on his left wrist that said: "1 means my pride as a goalkeeper and my sense of responsibility as a keeper. It is meant to be."

Jung is a Christian.

In July 2010, Jung appeared in the SBS variety show Running Man.

In the wake of the COVID-19 pandemic, Jung donated 30 million won (about 3 million yen) to "International Relief Development NGO Good Neighbors" to support children in vulnerable groups and low-income families who are experiencing difficulties with the pandemic.

== Career statistics ==
=== Club ===
As of the start from 2024 season.

Appearances and goals by club, season and competition
Club	Season	League			National cup		League cup		Continental		Others		Total	
Club	Season	Division	Apps	Goals	Apps	Goals	Apps	Goals	Apps	Goals	Apps	Goals	Apps	Goals
Pohang Steelers
Pohang Steelers	2006	K League	15	0	1	0	11	0	—		—		27	0
Pohang Steelers	2007	K League	14	0	3	0	2	0	—		—		19	0
Pohang Steelers	Total		29	0	4	0	13	0	—		—		46	0
Seongnam Ilhwa Chunma	2008	K League	27	0	2	0	7	0	—		—		36	0
Seongnam Ilhwa Chunma	2009	K League	29	0	1	0	7	0	—		—		37	0
Seongnam Ilhwa Chunma	2010	K League	30	0	3	0	0	0	11	0	3 (Note: Appearances in FIFA Club World Cup)	0	47	0
Seongnam Ilhwa Chunma	Total		86	0	6	0	14	0	11	0	3	0	120	0
Suwon Samsung Bluewings	2011	K League	30	0	5	0	1	0	10	0	—		46	0
Suwon Samsung Bluewings	2012	K League	33	0	2	0	—		—		—		35	0
Suwon Samsung Bluewings	2013	K League 1	34	0	2	0	—		5	0	—		41	0
Suwon Samsung Bluewings	2014	K League 1	34	0	1	0	—		—		—		35	0
Suwon Samsung Bluewings	2015	K League 1	19	0	1	0	—		3	0	—		23	0
Suwon Samsung Bluewings	Total		150	0	11	0	1	0	18	0	—		180	0
Kawasaki Frontale	2016	J1 League	29	0	4	0	2	0	—		—		35	0
Kawasaki Frontale	2017	J1 League	33	0	0	0	4	0	9	0	—		46	0
Kawasaki Frontale	2018	J1 League	31	0	2	0	1	0	4	0	1 (Note: Appearance in Japanese Super Cup)	0	39	0
Kawasaki Frontale	2019	J1 League	27	0	1	0	0	0	6	0	1	0	35	0
Kawasaki Frontale	2020	J1 League	34	0	2	0	4	0	—		—		40	0
Kawasaki Frontale	2021	J1 League	33	0	5	0	2	0	6	0	1	0	47	0
Kawasaki Frontale	2022	J1 League	31	0	1	0	2	0	6	0	1	0	41	0
Kawasaki Frontale	2023	J1 League	22	0	5	0	1	0	5	0	0	0	33	0
Kawasaki Frontale	Total		240	0	20	0	16	0	36	0	4	0	316	0
Career total			505	0	41	0	44	0	65	0	7	0	662	0

=== International ===
Appearances and goals by national team and year
National team	Year	Apps	Goals
South Korea	2008	12	0
South Korea	2010	12	0
South Korea	2011	16	0
South Korea	2012	5	0
South Korea	2013	12	0
South Korea	2014	7	0
South Korea	2015	1	0
South Korea	2016	2	0
Career total		67	0

== Honours ==
Pohang Steelers

- K League 1: 2007
- Korean FA Cup runner-up: 2007

Seongnam Ilhwa Chunma

- AFC Champions League: 2010
- Korean FA Cup runner-up: 2009

Suwon Samsung Bluewings

- Korean FA Cup runner-up: 2011

Kawasaki Frontale

- J1 League: 2017, 2018, 2020, 2021
- Emperor's Cup: 2020, 2023
- Japanese Super Cup: 2019, 2021

South Korea U23

- Summer Olympics bronze medal: 2012

South Korea

- AFC Asian Cup runner-up: 2015
- EAFF Championship: 2008

Individual

- K League All-Star: 2010, 2012, 2013, 2015
- J1 League Best XI: 2018, 2020
