= Sasa Ognenovski =

Australian footballer

Saša Ognenovski
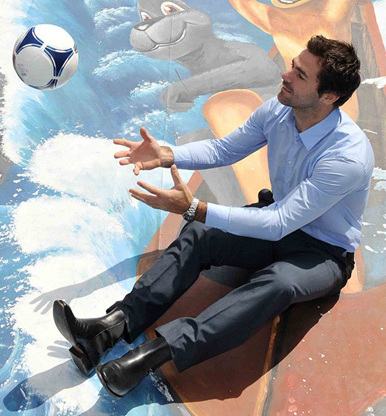
- Ognenovski in 2012

Personal information
- Full name: Sasa Ognenovski
- Date of birth: 3 April 1979 (age 47)
- Place of birth: Melbourne, Victoria, Australia
- Height: 1.95 m (6 ft 5 in)
- Position: Centre-back

Team information
- Current team: Macarthur FC (head coach)

Senior career*
Years	Team	Apps	(Gls)
1997–2000	Preston Lions	73	(1)
2000–2002	Melbourne Knights	46	(0)
2002–2003	Panachaiki	2	(0)
2003–2004	Preston Lions	36	(1)
2005	Fawkner-Whittlesea Blues	32	(8)
2006–2008	Queensland Roar	35	(1)
2008–2009	Adelaide United	20	(3)
2009–2012	Seongnam Ilhwa Chunma	80	(9)
2012–2014	Umm Salal	29	(1)
2014–2015	Sydney FC	15	(2)
2017–2018	Preston Lions	2	(0)
2022–2023	Preston Lions	7	(0)
Total		377	(26)

International career^{‡}
2010–2013	Australia	22	(1)

Managerial career
- 2019–2020: Dandenong City (assistant)
- 2020–2021: Dandenong City
- 2022–2023: Preston Lions (assistant)
- 2026: Preston Lions (assistant)
- 2026–: Macarthur FC
Medal record
Men's football
Representing Australia
AFC Asian Cup
Runner-up	2011 Qatar
- * Club domestic league appearances and goals as of 20 August 2022 ‡ National team caps and goals as of 9 December 2013

Saša Ognenovski (Macedonian: Саша Огненовски; born 3 April 1979) is an Australian former soccer player who played as a centre-back for the Australia national team.

In 2010, he was named the Asian Footballer of the Year by Asian Football Confederation after helping K League club Seongnam Ilhwa Chunma win the AFC Champions League. This achievement led him to be included in the Australian squad for the 2011 AFC Asian Cup. Alongside Robert Cornthwaite and Eli Babalj, Ognenovski is the joint third tallest soccer player to have played for the Australia national team at 1.95 m, behind 2.02-m-tall Zeljko Kalac and 1.98-m-tall Harry Souttar.

== Early life ==
Ognenovski was born on 3 April 1979 in Melbourne, Victoria. He is of Macedonian descent.

== Club career ==
Ognenovski played for Macedonian Australian club Preston Lions for four years early in his career before joining National Soccer League club Melbourne Knights in 2000. He moved to Greek side Panahaiki in 2002, but returned to Preston Lions the next year after making only two Alpha Ethniki appearances.

In 2006, Ognenovski transferred to Queensland Roar, started to play at the A-League. In the 2008–09 season, he participated as an Adelaide United player in the 2008 AFC Champions League final and was selected for the A-League Team of the Season by Professional Footballers Australia. He was also voted the second best Macedonian footballer behind Lazio's forward Goran Pandev.

In January 2009, Ognenovski received an offer from Shin Tae-yong, then manager of K League club Seongnam Ilhwa Chunma and former coach of Queensland Roar. On 13 January 2009, Adelaide United revealed he would join Seongnam at the end of the 2008–09 season on a two-year deal. He gave a glowing tribute to the club upon the announcement saying, "I've met some great people, the owners Nick and Dario are probably the best people I've met in football so it is a tough decision but obviously I have to secure my future and look after my family so that was the main reason that I took up the offer".

In his first season at Seongnam, Ognenovski played both legs of the 2009 K League Championship final against Jeonbuk Hyundai Motors, but lost 3–1 on aggregate. The next year, he captained the club and led them to win the 2010 AFC Champions League. He was selected as the Man of the Match in the 3–1 final win over Zob Ahan, where he scored the opening goal, and furthermore, he was named the tournament's Most Valuable Player. In 2011, he was criticised for attempting to transfer to league rivals FC Seoul, but repaid the club for their trust by bringing a Korean FA Cup title. Australian soccer players gained popularity with K League clubs due to his success at the time.

On 7 July 2012, Ognenovski moved to Qatar Stars League club Umm Salal. On 21 October, he made his debut for Umm Salal in a 1–1 draw with Al Kharaitiyat.

On 4 February 2014, Ognenovski signed for Sydney FC, moving back to the A-League. On 22 February, he scored his first goal for Sydney assisted by Alessandro Del Piero in a 2–0 win over Newcastle Jets. He and his partner Nikola Petković were in charge of Sydney's rearguard, and both were appointed the club's vice-captains on 8 October. However, he was sidelined after suffering from a thigh injury in a match against Melbourne Victory on 15 November. On 3 June 2015, he was released from the club.

== International career ==
Ognenovski was eligible to represent Australia, but after not being selected for 2011 AFC Asian Cup qualification matches against Indonesia and Kuwait, he expressed his disappointment and put himself up for selection for the country of his heritage, Macedonia (now North Macedonia). Although not available to play (due to not having yet received FIFA clearance), Ognenovski was called by Srečko Katanec to play for Macedonia in the match against Moldova on 11 February 2009, although he did not feature due to issues with his eligibility.

After dashing his hopes for playing for the Socceroos under the late Pim Verbeek, new manager Holger Osieck called him up for a friendly against Egypt in Cairo, Egypt, and he was subsequently named in the 23-man 2011 AFC Asian Cup squad. Throughout the AFC Asian Cup, he started every match and developed a solid defensive partnership with Lucas Neill, and scored the second goal in Australia's 6–0 defeat of Uzbekistan in the semi-finals.

== Managerial career ==
Between 2019 and 2021, Ognenovski managed National Premier Leagues Victoria club Dandenong City.

In August 2026, Ognenovski was named head coach of A-League Men club Macarthur FC, signing a two-year contract.

== Career statistics ==
=== Club ===
Appearances and goals by club, season and competition
Club	Season	League			National cup		League cup		Continental		Other		Total	
Club	Season	Division	Apps	Goals	Apps	Goals	Apps	Goals	Apps	Goals	Apps	Goals	Apps	Goals
Preston Lions	1997	Victorian Premier League	9	1	—		—		—		—		9	1
Preston Lions	1998	Victorian Premier League	20	0	—		—		—		—		20	0
Preston Lions	1999	Victorian Premier League	25	0	—		—		—		—		25	0
Preston Lions	2000	Victorian Premier League	19	0	—		—		—		—		19	0
Preston Lions	Total		73	1	—		—		—		—		73	1
Melbourne Knights	2000–01	National Soccer League	24	0	—		—		—		3 (Note: Appearances in National Soccer League finals series)	0	27	0
Melbourne Knights	2001–02	National Soccer League	22	0	—		—		—		2	0	24	0
Melbourne Knights	Total		46	0	—		—		—		5	0	51	0
Panachaiki	2002–03	Alpha Ethniki	2	0	2	0	—		—		—		4	0
Preston Lions	2003	Victorian Premier League	18	1	—		—		—		—		18	1
Preston Lions	2004	Victorian Premier League	18	0	—		—		—		1 (Note: Appearance in Victorian Premier League finals series)	0	19	0
Preston Lions	Total		36	1	—		—		—		1	0	37	1
Fawkner-Whittlesea Blues	2005	Victorian Premier League	19	4	—		—		—		1	0	20	4
Fawkner-Whittlesea Blues	2006	Victorian Premier League	13	4	—		—		—		—		13	4
Fawkner-Whittlesea Blues	Total		32	8	—		—		—		1	0	33	8
Queensland Roar	2006–07	A-League	17	0	—		—		—		5 (Note: Appearances in A-League Pre-season Challenge Cup)	0	22	0
Queensland Roar	2007–08	A-League	18	1	—		—		—		8 (Note: Five appearances and one goal in A-League Pre-season Challenge Cup, three appearances and one goal in A-League finals series)	2	26	3
Queensland Roar	Total		35	1	—		—		—		13	2	48	3
Adelaide United	2008–09	A-League	20	3	—		—		9	0	7 (Note: One appearance in A-League Pre-season Challenge Cup, four appearances in A-League finals series, two appearances in FIFA Club World Cup)	0	36	3
Seongnam Ilhwa Chunma	2009	K League	21	2	4	0	7	0	—		3 (Note: Appearances in K League Championship)	0	35	2
Seongnam Ilhwa Chunma	2010	K League	24	2	2	0	4	0	11	2	3 (Note: One appearance and one goal in K League Championship, two appearances and one goal in FIFA Club World Cup)	2	44	6
Seongnam Ilhwa Chunma	2011	K League	24	5	5	2	4	0	—		—		33	7
Seongnam Ilhwa Chunma	2012	K League	11	0	1	0	—		5	0	—		17	0
Seongnam Ilhwa Chunma	Total		80	9	12	2	15	0	16	2	6	2	129	15
Umm Salal	2012–13	Qatar Stars League	18	1					—				18	1
Umm Salal	2013–14	Qatar Stars League	11	0					—				11	0
Umm Salal	Total		29	1					—				29	1
Sydney FC	2013–14	A-League	9	1	—		—		—		1 (Note: Appearance in A-League finals series)	0	10	1
Sydney FC	2014–15	A-League	6	1	1	0	—		—		0	0	7	1
Sydney FC	Total		15	2	1	0	—		—		1	0	17	2
Preston Lions	2017	VSL 1 North-West	1	0	—		—		—		—		1	0
Preston Lions	2018	VSL 1 North-West	1	0	—		—		—		—		1	0
Preston Lions	Total		2	0	—		—		—		—		2	0
Preston Lions	2022	NPL Victoria 3	6	0	—		—		—		—		6	0
Preston Lions	2023	NPL Victoria 2	1	0	—		—		—		—		1	0
Preston Lions	Total		7	0	—		—		—		—		7	0
Total			377	26	15	2	15	0	25	2	34	4	466	34

=== International ===
Appearances and goals by national team and year
National team	Year	Apps	Goals
Australia	2010	1	0
Australia	2011	11	1
Australia	2012	6	0
Australia	2013	4	0
Total		22	1

List of international goals scored by Sasa Ognenovski
No.	Date	Venue	Opponent	Score	Result	Competition
1	25 January 2011	Al Rayyan, Qatar	Uzbekistan	2–0	6–0	2011 AFC Asian Cup

== Honours ==
Adelaide United

- AFC Champions League runner-up: 2008

Seongnam Ilhwa Chunma

- AFC Champions League: 2010
- Korean FA Cup: 2011

Preston Lions

- National Premier Leagues Victoria 3: 2022

Australia

- AFC Asian Cup runner-up: 2011

Individual

- A-League Team of the Season by Professional Footballers Australia: 2008–09
- AFC Champions League Most Valuable Player: 2010
- AFC Player of the Year: 2010
- K League 1 Best XI: 2010
