= Lee Sang-gi =

Lee Sang-gi may refer to:

- Lee Sang-ki (fencer) (born 1966), South Korean male épée fencer
- Lee Sang-gi (footballer, born 1987), South Korean football goalkeeper
- Lee Sang-gi (footballer, born 1996), South Korean football defender
