= No Jong-gun =

South Korean footballer

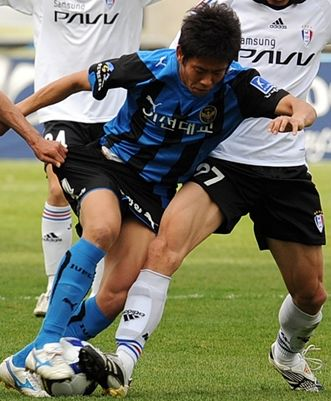

Personal information
- Date of birth: February 24, 1981 (age 45)
- Place of birth: Seoul, South Korea
- Height: 1.75 m (5 ft 9 in)
- Position: Defensive midfielder

Team information
- Current team: Yangju Citizen
- Number: 25

Youth career
- Incheon University

Senior career*
Years	Team	Apps	(Gls)
2003–2010	Incheon United	132	(1)
2011	Seoul United	25	(0)
2012–	Yangju Citizen	26	(0)
- * Club domestic league appearances and goals

- No Jong-gun
- Hangul: 노종건
- RR: No Jonggeon
- MR: No Chonggŏn

No Jong-gun (born February 24, 1981) is a South Korean football player who currently plays for Yangju Citizen. He previously played for Incheon United in the K-League. He is a defensive midfielder.

== Career ==
In 2003, No entered Incheon United as the founding member, and in 2004, he made a debut in K-league. He was Incheon's best player when the team finished the league as a runner-up in 2005. In 2008, he was appointed as the captain of the team. He made 134 appearances and scored one goal and two assists.

=== Career statistics ===
- K-League Records

Club	Year	Apps	Sub	Goal	Assist
Incheon United	2004	7	2	0	0
Incheon United	2005	30	8	1	0
Incheon United	2006	28	10	0	0
Incheon United	2007	23	14	0	0
Incheon United	2008	23	9	0	2
Incheon United	2009	19	9	0	0
Incheon United	2010	2	2	0	0
Total (K-League)	-	132	54	1	2

K-League records include K-League Cup records. as of the end of 2010.

Sporting positions
Preceded by Lim Joong-yong	Incheon United captain 2008	Succeeded by Lee Jun-young
