= Susung High School =

- 수성고등학교
- Jangan-gu, Suwon; South Korea

Information
- Type: Public
- Motto: Honest·Creation·Courage
- Established: 25 April 1955
- Authority: Gyeonggi-do Office of Education
- Principal: Park Hae-oh(박해오)
- Faculty: 101 (as of 2013)
- Grades: 10–12
- Enrollment: 1,461 (as of 2013)
- Tree: Ginkgo biloba
- Flower: Rose
- Bird: Eagle
- Website: susung.hs.kr

Susung High School (Korean: 수성고등학교; Hanja: 水城高等學校) is a high school located in Suwon, South Korea. As of April 2013, the school had 1,461 students enrolled. The school was established on 7 July 1954 and opened on 25 April 1955.

== Notable alumni ==
- Bang Moon-kyu, civil servant and 74th Minister of Ministry of Trade, Industry and Energy
- Kim Hyun-jun, civil servant and 23rd Commissioner of National Tax Service
- Park Jun-young, civil servant and 15th Deputy Minister of Oceans and Fisheries
- Hong Hyung-sun, civil servant and former Deputy Secretary General of National Assembly
- Yeom Tae-young, 26th, 27th, 28th Mayor of Suwon
- Jeong Myeong-geun, 8th Mayor of Hwaseong
- Ha Eun-ho, 16th Mayor of Gunpo
- Seok Jong-gun, army officer (Major General)
- Lee Soon-kwang, army officer (Major General)
- Won Yoo-chul, politician and 15th, 16th, 18th, 19th, 20th Member of National Assembly
- Ahn Min-seok, politician and 17th, 18th, 19th, 20th, 21st Member of National Assembly
- Kim Seung-won, politician and 21st Member of National Assembly and former judge
- Kim Sang-min, politician and 19th Member of National Assembly
- Yu Young-ha, lawyer and former prosecutor and legal counsel to the 18th President Park Geun-hye
- Kwak Jae-yong, film director
- Kim Hak-min, volleyball player
- Oh Dae-gyu, actor
