= Haman Public Stadium =

Sports venue in Haman, South Korea

Coordinates: 35°16′54.98″N 128°23′53.46″E

Haman Stadium is a multi-use stadium in Haman, South Korea. It is currently used mostly for football matches. The stadium has a capacity for 15,000 spectators. This home base of K4 League new club, Haman FC.
