= Kim Jun-young =

South Korean economist (born 1951)

19th President of Sungkyunkwan University
- Incumbent
- Assumed office January 2011

Personal details
- Born: Kim Jun-young; September 25, 1951 (age 75) Sangju, South Korea
- Education: Sungkyunkwan University; University of Minnesota
- Profession: College administrator, Academic, Economics

Kim Jun-young (born September 25, 1951) is a South Korean economist, professor, and the current 19th president of Sungkyunkwan University. Under his leadership, the university has made globalisation a top priority, actively seeking partnerships with foreign universities to expand two-way student exchange. Kim is one of Korea's leading experts on macroeconomics, and he still teaches a popular class on the subject, rare for a Korean university president. He has published numerous books on the subject, including one bestseller, Macroeconomics.

== Education ==
He received his Bachelor of Economics from Sungkyunkwan University in 1975. He received his MS in 1979 and PhD in 1984, both from the Graduate School of Economics of University of Minnesota. He received an honorary doctorate of Law from National Chengchi University in 2011.

== Career ==
- October 1973: passed higher administration exam (14th)
- 1989: began working as a professor for SKKU's School of Economics
- August 1992 – August 1993: Harvard University visiting professor
- March 1996 – February 1998: Sungkyunkwan University Dean of School of Economics
- April 1996 – May 1998: Korea Institute of Public Finance director
- June 1996 – May 1998: Korean Journal of Local Finance director
- 1996 ~ present: Bank of Korea member
- January 1997 – December 2002: Sweden International Social Security Association editorial board
- January 1998 – December 2002: Sweden International Social Security Association councilor
- February 1998 – December 2002: Korea Economic Association director
- March 1998 – February 1999: Korea International Economic Association director
- April 1998 – June 2002: Korea Institute of Finance auditor
- April 2001 – June 2002: Korea Institute of Finance chairman (17th)
- February 2003 – March 2004: Sungkyunkwan University provost
- April 2004 – March 2006: Sungkyunkwan University School of Planning and Coordination director
- February 2007 – January 2011: Sungkyunkwan University Humanities and Social Sciences Campus Vice Chancellor
- August 2007 – July 2008: Ministry of Finance and Economy Development Review Committee member
- May 2008 – April 2010: Ministry of Education, Science and Technology Higher Education Policy Advisory Committee member
- September 2009 – August 2010: Ministry of Finance and Economy Waterfront Policy Advisory Committee Chairman
- September 2009 – August 2010: Ministry of Education, Science and Technology Conflict Management Committee Chairman
- September 2009 – August 2011: Ministry of Education, Science and Technology University Advancement Committee Chairman
- June 2010 – 2013 June: Customs Administration Development Review Committee Chairman
- September 2010 ~ present: North American Association of Higher Education Director
- January 2011 ~ present: Sungkyunkwan University President (19th)
- April 2012 – April 2014: Korea Council for University Education Vice-President
- April 2013 – March 2014: Korea Private University Presidents Council President (16th)
- April 2014 ~ present: Korean Council for University Education President
