= Kim Hyung-ho =

South Korean footballer

Kim Hyung-Ho
Personal information
- Full name: Kim Hyung-Ho
- Date of birth: 20 February 1987 (age 39)
- Place of birth: Gwangyang, Jeollanam-do, South Korea
- Height: 1.87 m (6 ft 1 1/2 in)
- Position: Midfielder

Youth career
- Chunnam Dragons U-18

Senior career*
Years	Team	Apps	(Gls)
2009–2011	Chunnam Dragons	49	(1)

International career^{‡}
2006	South Korea U-20	1	(0)
- * Club domestic league appearances and goals as of 14 July 2011 ‡ National team caps and goals as of 14 July 2011

Kim Hyung-Ho (Korean: 김형호; born 20 February 1987) is a South Korean football player.

He was arrested on the charge connected with the match fixing allegations on 7 July 2011.
