= Lim Joong-yong =

South Korean footballer and coach

Personal information
- Full name: Lim Joong-yong
- Date of birth: 21 April 1975 (age 51)
- Place of birth: South Korea
- Height: 1.84 m (6 ft 0 in)
- Position: Defender

Youth career
- 1995–1998: Sungkyunkwan University

Senior career*
Years	Team	Apps	(Gls)
1999–2002	Busan I'Cons	43	(1)
2003	Daegu FC	15	(1)
2004–2011	Incheon United	163	(6)
Total		221	(8)
- * Club domestic league appearances and goals as of 31 October 2011

- Lim Joong-yong
- Hangul: 임중용
- Hanja: 林重容
- RR: Im Jungyong
- MR: Im Chungyong

Lim Joong-Yong (Korean: 임중용; born 21 April 1975) is a retired South Korean football player and coach.

== Club career ==
Im made his professional debut for Busan I'cons in 1999, playing a number of games in his first two seasons with the club. However, he saw much less matchplay in 2001 and 2002, and a move to newly formed Daegu FC beckoned. After Daegu's debut season in the K-League, for 2004, Im moved to current club Incheon United, newly formed for the 2004 K-League season. Im remains with Incheon into the 2010 season, having played over 200 games in all competitions for the club.

Im plays both as a defender and as a mid-field defender. He retired end of 2011 season.

== Club career statistics ==
Club performance			League		Cup		League Cup		Continental		Total	
Season	Club	League	Apps	Goals	Apps	Goals	Apps	Goals	Apps	Goals	Apps	Goals
South Korea			League		KFA Cup		League Cup		Asia		Total	
1999	Busan I'Cons	K-League	25	1	?	?	9	0	?	?		
2000	Busan I'Cons	K-League	16	0	?	?	8	0	—			
2001	Busan I'Cons	K-League	2	0	?	?	0	0	—			
2002	Busan I'Cons	K-League	0	0	?	?	0	0	—			
2003	Daegu FC	K-League	15	1	1	0	—		—		16	1
2004	Incheon United	K-League	17	1	1	0	12	0	—		30	1
2005	Incheon United	K-League	27	3	1	0	12	0	—		40	3
2006	Incheon United	K-League	25	1	4	0	7	0	—		36	1
2007	Incheon United	K-League	23	0	4	0	10	0	—		37	0
2008	Incheon United	K-League	23	0	0	0	2	0	—		25	0
2009	Incheon United	K-League	24	1	0	0	6	0	—		30	1
2010	Incheon United	K-League	23	0	2	0	3	0	—		28	0
2011	Incheon United	K-League	1	0	0	0	0	0	—		1	0
Career total			221	8			69	0				

== Honours ==
=== Individual ===
- K-League Best XI : 2005

Sporting positions
Preceded by Kim Hyun-Soo	Incheon United captain 2005-2008	Succeeded by No Jong-Gun
Preceded by No Jong-Gun	Incheon United captain 2009-2010; With: Lee Jun-Young	Succeeded by Jeon Jae-Ho
