= Kim Lee-sub =

South Korean footballer (born 1974)

Personal information
- Full name: Kim Lee-sub (김이섭)
- Date of birth: April 27, 1974 (age 52)
- Place of birth: South Korea
- Height: 1.84 m (6 ft 0 in)
- Position: Goalkeeper

Team information
- Current team: Incheon United

Senior career*
Years	Team	Apps	(Gls)
1997–2001	Pohang Steelers	77	(0)
2002–2003	Jeonbuk Hyundai	19	(0)
2004–2010	Incheon United	85	(0)
- * Club domestic league appearances and goals

Kim Lee-sub (born April 27, 1974) is a South Korean former football player who since 2004 has played for Incheon United (formerly Pohang Steelers and Jeonbuk Hyundai).
