= Do Hwa-sung =

South Korean footballer (born 1980)

Do Hwa-Sung
Personal information
- Full name: Do Hwa-Sung (도화성)
- Date of birth: June 27, 1980 (age 46)
- Place of birth: South Korea
- Height: 1.77 m (5 ft 10 in)
- Position: Midfielder

Senior career*
Years	Team	Apps	(Gls)
2003–2008	Busan I'Park	78	(2)
2009–2010	Incheon United	35	(4)
- * Club domestic league appearances and goals

Do Hwa-Sung (born 27 June 1980) is a South Korean football player. He related match-fixing scandal and his football career was rescinded.

He record the most longest distance goal in K-league (65 meter)
