= Kim Jun-young (footballer) =

South Korean footballer

Personal information
- Date of birth: 31 May 1999 (age 27)
- Place of birth: Seoul, Korea Republic
- Position: Midfielder

Youth career
- –2019: Hanyang University

Senior career*
Years	Team	Apps	(Gls)
2020	Dinamo Minsk	2	(0)
- * Club domestic league appearances and goals as of 27 June 2020

Kim Jun-young (Korean: 김준영; born 31 May 1999) is a South Korean former professional footballer who most recently played for Dinamo Minsk.
