= Paju National Football Center =

Football training ground in Paju, South Korea

Coordinates: 37°46′32.16″N 126°41′7.05″E

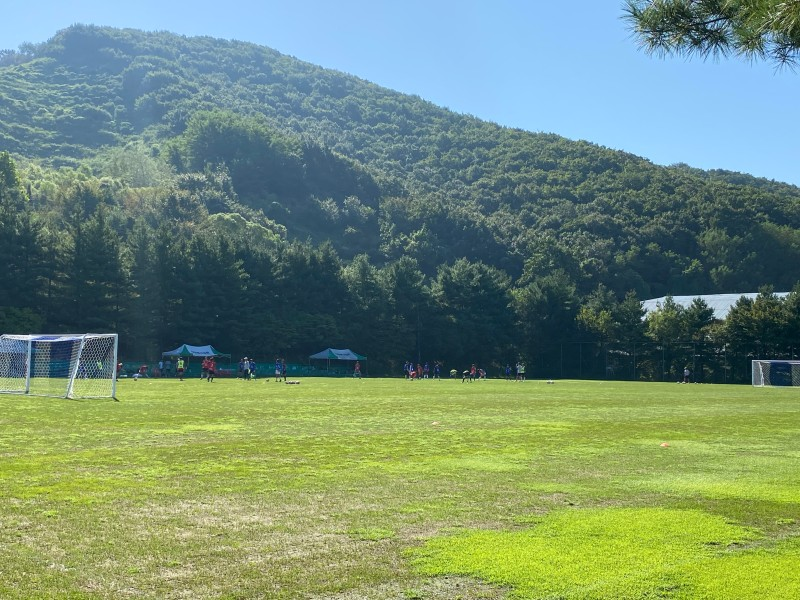
Paju National Football Center

Paju National Football Center, commonly called Paju NFC, is training ground in Paju, South Korea. It is mostly used as training ground by Korea Republic national football team and other national football team in South Korea.

== Structure and facilities ==
- Grass ground
  - Blue Dragon (Korean: 청룡)
  - White Tiger (Korean: 백호)
  - Hwarang (Korean: 화랑)
  - Chungmu (Korean: 충무)
  - Sprout (Korean: 새싹)
  - Blue Clouds (Korean: 청운)
- Artificial grass ground
  - Unification (Korean: 통일)
- Futsal ground
