= Kim Jeong-hyun (footballer) =

South Korean footballer

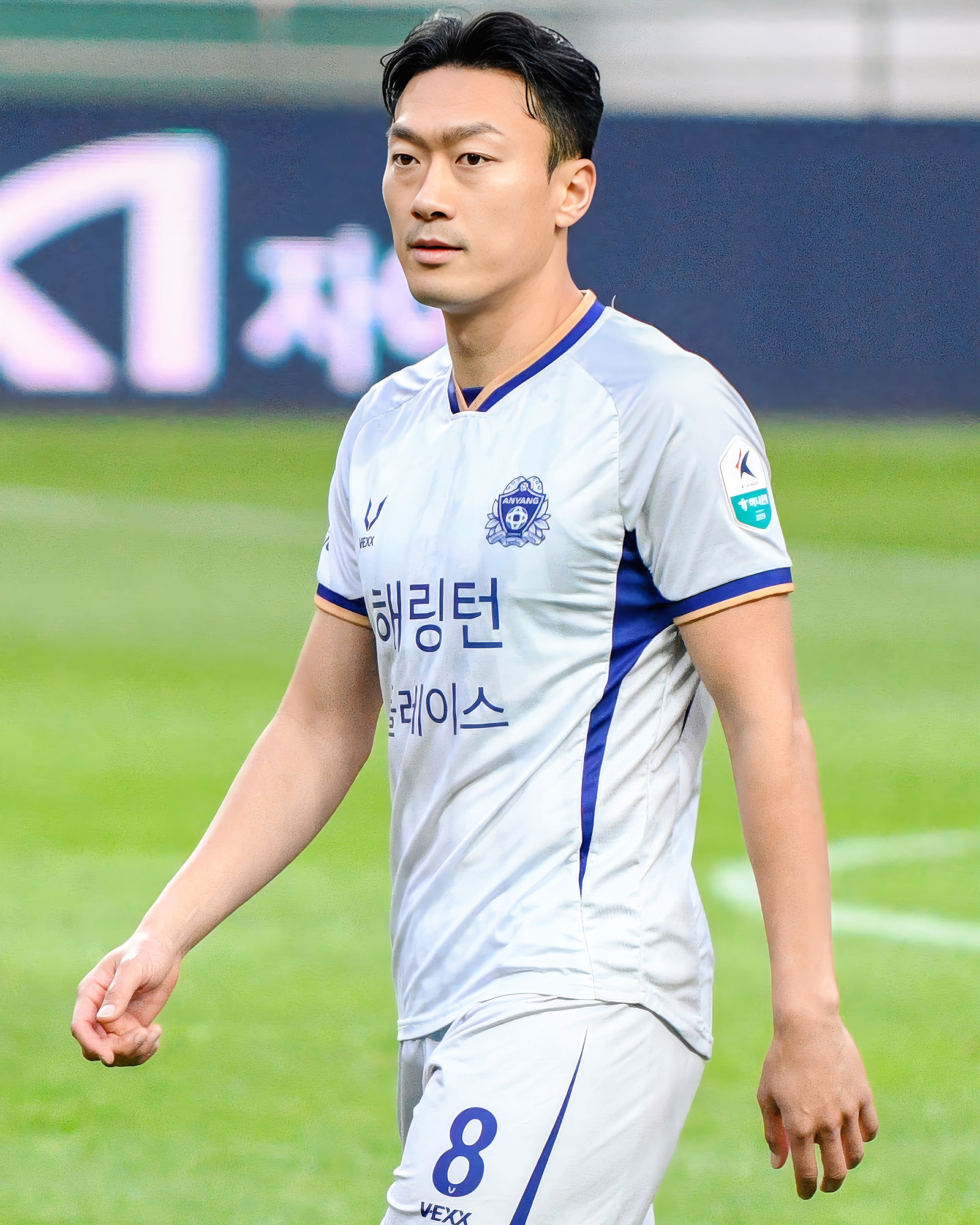
- Kim in 2026

Personal information
- Date of birth: 1 June 1993 (age 33)
- Place of birth: South Korea
- Height: 1.85 m (6 ft 1 in)
- Position: Midfielder

Team information
- Current team: FC Anyang
- Number: 8

Senior career*
Years	Team	Apps	(Gls)
2012–2015	Oita Trinita	37	(2)
2016–2017	Gwangju FC	21	(3)
2018–2019	Seongnam FC	48	(3)
2020–2022	Busan IPark	43	(1)
2022	→ FC Anyang (loan)	10	(1)
2023–	FC Anyang	98	(7)
- * Club domestic league appearances and goals as of 3 August 2025

- Kim Jeong-hyun
- Hangul: 김정현
- Hanja: 金楨鉉
- RR: Gim Jeonghyeon
- MR: Kim Chŏnghyŏn

Kim Jeong-hyun (Korean: 김정현; born 1 June 1993) is a South Korean professional footballer who plays as a midfielder for FC Anyang in the K League 1.

== Career ==
Kim Jeong-hyun made his debut for Oita Trinita in the J2 League on 17 June 2012 against Mito HollyHock in which he started and played for 88 minutes as Oita Trinita won the match 1–0.
