= Kim Yong-dae (footballer) =

South Korean footballer (born 1979)

Kim Yong-dae 김용대
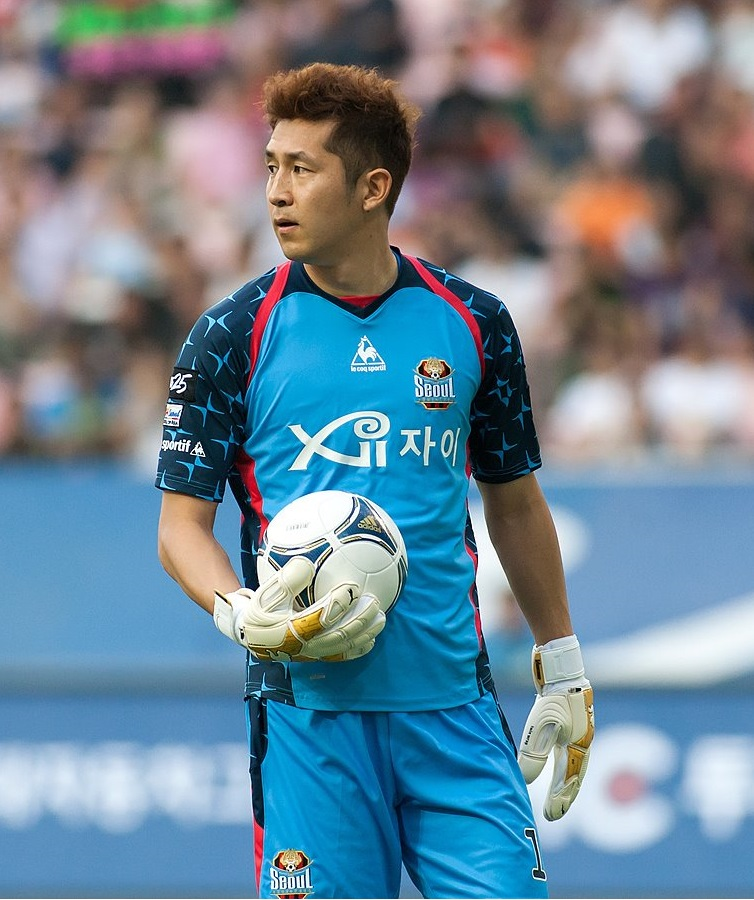
- Kim with FC Seoul in 2012

Personal information
- Date of birth: 11 October 1979 (age 47)
- Place of birth: Miryang, Gyeongnam, South Korea
- Height: 1.88 m (6 ft 2 in)
- Position: Goalkeeper

Youth career
- 1998–2001: Yonsei University

Senior career*
Years	Team	Apps	(Gls)
2002–2005	Busan IPark	85	(0)
2006–2009	Seongnam Ilhwa Chunma	53	(0)
2008–2009	→ Gwangju Sangmu (Army)	50	(0)
2010–2015	FC Seoul	174	(0)
2016–2018	Ulsan Hyundai	66	(0)

International career^{‡}
1998–1999	South Korea U20	11	(0)
1999–2000	South Korea U23	24	(0)
2000–2011	South Korea	21	(0)
Medal record
Representing South Korea
Men's football
Asian Games
Bronze medal – third place	2002 Busan	Team
- * Club domestic league appearances and goals as of 11 December 2018 ‡ National team caps and goals as of 31 May 2008

- Kim Yong-dae
- Hangul: 김용대
- Hanja: 金龍大
- RR: Gim Yongdae
- MR: Kim Yongdae

Kim Yong-dae (Korean: 김용대; born 11 October 1979) is a South Korean former football goalkeeper who last played for Ulsan Hyundai. He is considered one of South Korea's best goalkeepers even to the point where he had been nicknamed by fans as "Yong Der Sar" in reference to former goalkeeper Edwin van der Sar of Manchester United and the Netherlands.

== Club career ==
Kim was picked up by Busan IPark in 2002, a year after he graduated from Yonsei University. From there, he quickly spent three seasons in and out, from 2002 to 2005, amassing 85 appearances. His first trophy would soon come as Busan IPark would become the 2004 Korean FA Cup champions.

Seongnam Ilhwa Chunma acquired his services from Busan in 2006 where he spent another three years, from 2006 to 2009, but saw his play time reduced with a total of 53 appearances. Despite his appearances, in the first year of his club, he was able to become the 2006 K-League champions, and the K-League Cup runner-up. The following year saw him become the runner-up of the K-League and once more in the 2009 K-League.

As required by law, every male South Korea member must attend a mandatory two-year service. Kim was then transferred to the army club Gwangju Sangmu for two years, in 2008, in which he played for the club with 50 appearances.

After his military stint was finished, he moved to FC Seoul in 2010 where he would finally start getting more play time. That year, in 2010, he won the 2010 K-League, 2010 K-League Cup, and was selected as the best goalkeeper in the K-League via the 2010 K-League Best XI. In 2011, FC Seoul would come third in a close battle between the second and fourth positions sandwiched between Pohang Steelers and Suwon Bluewings.

In 2012, success would keep following Kim as he won the 2012 K-League and, once again, was voted as the best goalkeeper in the K-League via the 2012 K-League Best XI, as he was an integral part of FC Seoul.

The 2013 season saw a slight decline in Kim's goalkeeping abilities as he was benched for big games like the Super Match and 2014 Asian Champions League matches. However, his form would regain especially in vital knockout matches which saw him play well against Beijing Guoan.

On 31 July 2013, an in-form Kim Yong-dae put in a clear Man of the Match performance against Jeju United making many saves and to end it, saving a penalty in injury-time to deny Jeju United a draw and give FC Seoul the win.

Kim would continue his superb form with the club by making vital saves and helping them defeat Suwon Bluewings for the first time in three years in the K League Classic's Super Match as well as matches with Incheon United, Busan IPark and Daejeon Citizen.

On 21 August 2013, Kim brilliantly denied Brazilian Bruno César of Al-Alhi, during the start of the second half, from a free-kick spot from the middle of their half when he dove to save ball which many fans declared it as a "super save."

In the 2013 AFC Champions League Final, Kim played Guangzhou Evergrande of China in a two-legged affair ending 2–2 and 1–1. In both legs, Kim performed fantastic saves to keep his team level including a diving save from Dario Conca and a kick-save from Muriqui among others. Despite both legs being ties, Guangzhou Evergrande went on to win due to the away-goal rule thus leaving Kim and FC Seoul once again runners-up.

== International career ==
Although he did not have a chance to play for South Korea in 2006 FIFA World Cup as he was pushed to Lee Woon-Jae, the number one goalkeeper in the South Korea team during the worldcup (even Lee was only able to play three times since Korea did not get through to the Round of 16), he was enlisted as the second [number two] goalkeeper for South Korea.

He was considered as the number two goalkeeper of South Korea currently and if he won the competition between Lee Woon-Jae and Kim Young-Kwang for the position of goalkeeper, he would be able to play in 2007 AFC Asian Cup, which will be taking place in July 2007. When the tournament rolled around, Kim was given the bench while the current, at the time, goalkeeper Lee Woon-Jae played all the matches.

In 2008, Kim saw his bargain for the top goalkeeper drop due to newcomer Jung Sung-Ryong taking over while Kim sat on the bench for many matches.

Two more years would go by after Kim would not be picked for a match until 2011 when he started on the bench against an Asian Cup match between Bahrain.

After another two years, in 2013, Kim was called up for the national team to sit on the bench against Qatar in a World Cup qualifying match, however would not see play time due to Jung Sung-Ryong, of Suwon Bluewings, currently being South Korea's main goalkeeper.

== Club career statistics ==
As of 10 June 2013

Club performance			League		Cup		League Cup		Continental		Total	
Season	Club	League	Apps	Goals	Apps	Goals	Apps	Goals	Apps	Goals	Apps	Goals
Korea Republic			League		FA Cup		League Cup		Asia		Total	
2002	Busan I'Park	K League 1	8	0	—		1	0	—		9	0
2003	Busan I'Park	K League 1	36	0	1	0	—		—		37	0
2004	Busan I'Park	K League 1	23	0	5	0	6	0	—		34	0
2005	Busan I'Park	K League 1	18	0	1	0	11	0	—		30	0
2006	Seongnam Ilhwa	K League 1	23	0	0	0	5	0	—		28	0
2007	Seongnam Ilhwa	K League 1	28	0	0	0	1	0	10	0	39	0
2008	Gwangju Sangmu	K League 1	24	0	2	0	1	0	—		27	0
2009	Gwangju Sangmu	K League 1	26	0	0	0	0	0	—		26	0
2009	Seongnam Ilhwa	K League 1	2	0	0	0	0	0	—		2	0
2010	FC Seoul	K League 1	30	0	1	0	7	0	—		38	0
2011	FC Seoul	K League 1	29	0	3	0	0	0	7	0	39	0
2012	FC Seoul	K League 1	44	0	3	0	0	0	0	0	44	0
2013	FC Seoul	K League 1	11	0	3	0	0	0	6	0	17	0
Country	Korea Republic		247	0	13	0	32	0	17	0	370	0
Total			247	0	13	0	32	0	17	0	370	0

== International career statistics ==
Korea Republic national team
Year	Apps	Goals
2000	9	0
2001	2	0
2002	0	0
2003	2	0
2004	1	0
2005	1	0
2006	0	0
2007	3	0
2008	3	0
2009	0	0
2010	0	0
2011	0	0
Total	21	0

== International clean sheets ==
Results list South Korea's goal tally first.

#	Date	Venue	Opponent	Result	Competition
1	5 April 2000	Seoul, South Korea	Laos	9–0	2000 AFC Asian Cup qualification
2	9 April 2000	Seoul, South Korea	Myanmar	4–0	2000 AFC Asian Cup qualification
3	26 April 2000	Seoul, South Korea	Japan	1–0	Friendly match
4	28 May 2000	Seoul, South Korea	FR Yugoslavia	0–0	Friendly match
5	30 May 2000	Seongnam, South Korea	FR Yugoslavia	0–0	Friendly match
6	9 June 2000	Tehran, Iran	Egypt	1–0	2000 LG Cup
7	28 July 2000	Beijing, China	China	1–0	Korea-China Annual Match
8	31 May 2003	Tokyo, Japan	Japan	1–0	Friendly match
9	29 September 2003	Incheon, South Korea	Nepal	16–0	2004 AFC Asian Cup qualification
10	14 February 2004	Ulsan, South Korea	Oman	5–0	Friendly match
11	6 February 2007	London, England	Greece	1–0	Friendly match
12	29 June 2007	Seogwipo, South Korea	Iraq	3–0	Friendly match

== Honours ==
=== Club ===
Busan I'Park

- Korean FA Cup Winner: 2004

Seongnam Ilhwa Chunma

- K League 1 Winner: 2006
- K League 1 Runner-up: 2007, 2009
- League Cup Runner-up: 2006

FC Seoul

- K League 1 Winner: 2010, 2012
- Korean FA Cup Winner: 2015
- Korean FA Cup Runner-up: 2014
- League Cup Winner: 2010
- AFC Champions League Runner-up: 2013

=== International ===
- EAFF East Asian Cup (2): 2003, 2008

=== Individual ===
- K League Best XI: 2010, 2012
- AFC Champions League Dream Team: 2013

== Filmography ==
=== Television show ===
Year	Title	Role	Notes	Ref.
2023	World's First Merchant	Contestant	Season 2	
