= Ki Jun-young =

South Korean writer

Ki Jun-Young
- Born: 1972 (age 53–54) Seoul, South Korea
- Language: Korean
- Nationality: South Korean

Ki Jun-Young (The romanization preferred by the author according to LTI Korea) (Hangul 기준영; born 1972) is a South Korean writer. She is the author of the short story collections Yeonaesoseol (연애소설 Romance Novel) and Isanghan jeongyeol (이상한 정열 A Strange Passion) and the novel Waildeu peonchi (와일드 펀치 Wild Punch).

== Life ==
Ki Jun-Young was born in Seoul, South Korea in 1972. She earned a specialist degree in film at the Korea National University of the Arts’ School of Film. She made her literary debut in 2009 when her short story “Jeni" (제니 Jenny) won the Munhakdongne New Writer Award. She received the Changbi Award for Best Novel in 2011 and the Munhakdongne Young Writers' Award in 2014 and 2016.

== Writing ==
Ki Jun-Young's works have a simple plot and minimal conflict between characters, but can still evoke a strong sense of doom and gloom. They feature characters who are acutely aware of the tensions and malaise underlying everyday life. Yet the circumstances that led them to become such people are left unexplained. This sparse narrative style that conveys the turmoil of daily life without much plot or conflict is a major characteristic of Ki's works.

Ki also captures the contradictions of human nature in indulging passions despite recognizing the transience of life. This theme is especially evident in Isanghan jeongyeol (이상한 정열 A Strange Passion). The book is about a man named Muheon who meets Malhui twenty years after dating her briefly in his youth and this time falls madly in love. But he does not act erratically or try to advance their relationship. Rather, the story dryly describes the psychology of Muheon, who, seized by a strange passion, feels that his life has skipped over something important and is now meaningless.

== Works ==
- 이상한 정열(2016) { A Strange Passion (2016) }
- 연애소설(2013) { Romance Novel (2013) }
- 와일드 펀치(2012) { Wild Punch (2012) }

== Awards ==
- 2016: Munhakdongne Young Writers' Award
- 2014: Munhakdongne Young Writers' Award
- 2011: Changbi Award for Best Novel
- 2009: Munhakdongne New Writer Award
