= Yeom Dong-gyun =

South Korean footballer (born 1983)

Personal information
- Date of birth: 6 September 1983 (age 43)
- Place of birth: South Korea
- Height: 1.88 m (6 ft 2 in)
- Position: Goalkeeper

Senior career*
Years	Team	Apps	(Gls)
2002–2010	Chunnam Dragons	97	(0)
2004–2005	→ Sangmu (military service)	7	(0)
2011	Jeonbuk Hyundai Motors	14	(0)

International career
2003	South Korea U-23	2	(0)
2008	South Korea	0	(0)
- * Club domestic league appearances and goals

- Yeom Dong-gyun
- Hangul: 염동균
- Hanja: 廉東均
- RR: Yeom Donggyun
- MR: Yŏm Tonggyun

Yeom Dong-gyun (born 3 November 1983) is a South Korean former professional footballer who played as a goalkeeper. He spent most of his career playing for Chunnam Dragons and was a part of the national team by 10 October 2008.

== Match-fixing ==
On 24 January 2011, Yeom joined Jeonbuk Hyundai Motors on a three-year contract, but was released for his involvement in an alleged match-fixing scandal five months later. He admitted that he had involved in match-fixing and accepted a bribe a year ago.

== Honours ==
Chunnam Dragons

- FA Cup: 2006, 2007

Sporting positions
Preceded by Kwak Tae-Hwi	Chunnam Dragons captain 2009-2010	Succeeded by Lee Woon-Jae
