= Park Jun-young (government official) =

South Korean politician (born 1967)

- 박준영

Deputy Minister of Oceans and Fisheries
- Incumbent
- Assumed office 15 August 2020
- President: Moon Jae-in
- Minister: Moon Seong-hyeok
- Preceded by: Kim Yang-soo

Personal details
- Born: 1967 (age 58–59) Icheon, South Korea
- Party: Independent
- Education: Korea University
- Occupation: Government official

Korean name
- Hangul: 박준영
- Hanja: 朴俊泳
- RR: Bak Junyeong
- MR: Pak Chunyŏng

Park Jun-young (Korean: 박준영, born 1967) is a South Korean government official serving as the deputy minister of oceans and fisheries since 2020.

Born in Icheon, Park attended Susung High School and studied public administration at Korea University. After qualifying for the public administration examination in 1992, Park worked at the Ministry of Oceans and Fisheries (Maritime and Port Administration until 1996), where he served various positions, including as the spokesperson of the ministry and the deputy director-general of fishing and farming. He also used to work at the Food and Agriculture Organization of the United Nations in 2003. Park was also the minister counselor of the Embassy of South Korea in London, United Kingdom in 2015. In the United Kingdom, he contributed to the election of Kitack Lim as the secretary-general of the International Maritime Organization.

On 14 August 2020, Park was appointed the deputy minister of oceans and fisheries, following his return to the ministry. On 16 April 2021, the President Moon Jae-in nominated Park as the new Minister of Oceans and Fisheries, replacing Moon Seong-hyeok. His nomination was widely regarded as in a relation with the Japanese government's controversial decision to release Fukushima nuclear water.

Nevertheless, he voluntarily withdrew himself on 13 May, following a controversy related to his wife who was criticised for possibly smuggling porcelains from the United Kingdom.
