= Lee Sang-gi (footballer, born 1996) =

South Korean footballer

Personal information
- Date of birth: 7 May 1996 (age 30)
- Place of birth: South Korea
- Height: 1.79 m (5 ft 10 in)
- Position: Defender

Team information
- Current team: Incheon United
- Number: 3

Youth career
- 2012–2013: Pohang Jecheol Technical High School
- 2013–2015: Pohang Jecheol High School
- 2015–2017: Yeungnam University

Senior career*
Years	Team	Apps	(Gls)
2017–2021	Pohang Steelers	71	(3)
2020–2021	→ Gimcheon Sangmu (army)	12	(1)
2021	Daegu FC	2	(0)
2022–2024	Gwangju FC	63	(1)
2025–	Incheon United	19	(0)

International career^{‡}
2012	South Korea U-17	6	(0)
- * Club domestic league appearances and goals as of 3 August 2026 ‡ National team caps and goals as of 7 April 2019

- Lee Sang-gi
- Hangul: 이상기
- Hanja: 李相基
- RR: I Sanggi
- MR: I Sanggi

Lee Sang-gi (Korean: 이상기; born 7 May 1996) is a South Korean football defender who plays for Incheon United.

== Career statistics ==
As of match played on 25 November 2023

Appearances and goals by club, season and competition
Club	Season	League			National Cup		Continental		Other		Total	
Club	Season	Division	Apps	Goals	Apps	Goals	Apps	Goals	Apps	Goals	Apps	Goals
Pohang Steelers	2017	K League 1	28	2	1	0	—		—		29	2
Pohang Steelers	2018	K League 1	28	1	1	0	—		—		29	1
Pohang Steelers	2019	K League 1	16	0	1	0	—		—		17	0
Pohang Steelers	Total		72	3	3	0	—		—		75	3
Sangju Sangmu/ Gimcheon Sangmu (army)	2020	K League 1	9	1	2	0	—		—		11	1
Sangju Sangmu/ Gimcheon Sangmu (army)	2021	K League 2	3	0	2	0	—		—		5	0
Sangju Sangmu/ Gimcheon Sangmu (army)	Total		12	1	4	0	—		—		16	1
Daegu FC	2021	K League 1	2	0	0	0	0	0	—		2	0
Gwangju FC	2022	K League 1	28	1	2	0	—		—		30	1
Gwangju FC	2023	K League 1	19	0	2	0	—		—		21	0
Gwangju FC	Total		47	1	4	0	—		—		51	1
Career totals			133	5	11	0	0	0	0	0	144	5
