= Lee Jun-young (footballer) =

South Korean footballer (born 1982)

Lee Jun-Young
Personal information
- Full name: Lee Jun-Young (이준영)
- Date of birth: December 26, 1982 (age 43)
- Place of birth: South Korea
- Height: 1.80 m (5 ft 11 in)
- Position: Forward

Team information
- Current team: Qingdao Jonoon

Youth career
- Kyunghee University

Senior career*
Years	Team	Apps	(Gls)
2003–2004	FC Seoul	48	(7)
2005–2012	Incheon United	106	(5)
2011–2012	→ Sangju Sangmu (Military service)	0	(0)
2014–	Qingdao Jonoon	0	(0)
- * Club domestic league appearances and goals as of 12 December 2013

Lee Jun-Young (born December 26, 1982) is a South Korean football player. He previously played for FC Seoul and Incheon United.

He was indefinitely expelled from the Korean Football League System for his involvement in a match-fixing scandal in July 2011.

Sporting positions
Preceded by No Jong-Gun	Incheon United captain 2009-2010; With: Lim Joong-Yong	Succeeded by Jeon Jae-Ho
