= Dario Fontanarosa =

Dario Fontanarosa is the former chairman of Adelaide United FC, he is also chief executive of Bianco Building Supplies and is the son-in-law of Nick Bianco.

== Biography ==
He became known within the Australian football (soccer) community for his handling of the events following the A-League 2006-07 grand final.

In April, 2008, Fontanarosa announced plans for a proposed $475 million inner city stadium with a capacity of 45,000 seats

Fontanarosa also assisted fans who traveled to Osaka, Japan for the final of the AFC Champions League, Including helping organizing a fan currency referred to as "Dario Dollars". He was later replaced as Chairman by AUFC director and managing director of Airport Travel Centre Mel Patzwald.
