= Lee Jun-yeong =

South Korean basketball player

Personal information
- Native name: 이준영
- Nationality: South Korean
- Born: c. 1917
- Died: 13 March 1969

Sport
- Sport: Basketball

Lee Jun-yeong (c. 1917 – 13 March 1969) was a South Korean basketball player. He represented South Korea in the men's basketball tournament at the 1948 Summer Olympics, where the team finished eighth.

== Career ==
Lee was among the early basketball players associated with Songdo High School. Lee later played for Bosung College and was among the members of its basketball team during its three consecutive victories at the All-Japan Basketball Championship from 1938 to 1940.

In March 1946, Lee was selected for the Gyeongseong team for a two-game basketball series against a Pyongyang selection. Gyeongseong won both games, 45–40 and 43–31.

In 1948, Lee was one of nine players selected for the Korean men's basketball team at the 1948 Summer Olympics in London. He appeared in eight games and scored 10 points as the team finished eighth overall.
