= Kim Seung-hyun (footballer) =

South Korean footballer

Kim Seung-Hyun
Personal information
- Full name: Kim Seung-Hyun
- Date of birth: 18 August 1979 (age 47)
- Place of birth: South Korea
- Height: 1.82 m (6 ft 0 in)
- Positions: Midfielder; forward

Team information
- Current team: Shanghai Shenhua

Youth career
- 1998–2001: Honam University

Senior career*
| Years | Team | Apps | (Gls) |
| 2002–2007 | Chunnam Dragons | 30 | (0) |
| 2004–2005 | → Gwangju Sangmu (army) | 13 | (2) |
| 2008 | Busan I'Park | 18 | (4) |
| 2009–2010 | Chunnam Dragons | 27 | (6) |
| 2011 | Daegu FC | 0 | (0) |
| 2014– | Shanghai Shenhua | 0 | (0) |

International career^{‡}
| 2000 | South Korea U-23 | 1 | (0) |
- * Club domestic league appearances and goals ‡ National team caps and goals as of 5 January 2011

- Kim Seung-hyun
- Hangul: 김승현
- Hanja: 金承鉉
- RR: Gim Seunghyeon
- MR: Kim Sŭnghyŏn

Kim Seung-Hyun (Korean: 김승현; born 18 August 1979) is a South Korea retired football player, having previously played for Gwangju Sangmu, Busan I'Park, and the Chunnam Dragons.

He was arrested on the charge connected with the match fixing allegations on 7 July 2011. But He was found not guilty in the supreme court.

== Club career ==
Kim spent the initial stages of his professional career at the Chunnam Dragons, before having to transfer to Gwangju Sangmu while fulfilling his military obligations. Completing his stint at Gwangju in 2005, Kim returned to the Dragons for two more seasons. For the 2008 K-League season, Kim moved to Busan for the year and then returned to the Dragons for a further two seasons. For 2011, Kim has transferred to Daegu FC.

In 2011, he was permanently banned from football for his involvement in the K-League match-fixing case, but was acquitted by the Supreme Court in July of that year, and his reputation was later restored by the K-League Board of Directors in September 2012.

== International career ==
Kim has made a single appearance for the U-23s, during the qualification stages for the 2000 Olympic games in Australia.
