= Incheon United FC =

South Korean football club

- Full name: Incheon United Football Club 인천 유나이티드 프로축구단
- Short name: IUFC
- Founded: 2003; 23 years ago
- Ground: Incheon Football Stadium
- Capacity: 20,891
- Owner: Incheon Metropolitan City
- Chairman: Park Chan-dae (Mayor of Incheon)
- Head coach: Yoon Jong-hwan
- League: K League 1
- 2025: K League 2, 1st of 14 (promoted)
- Website: incheonutd.com
Home colours	Away colours

Incheon United FC (Korean: 인천 유나이티드 FC) is a South Korean professional football club based in Incheon that competes in the K League 1, the top tier of South Korean football. Founded in 2003, the club is a so-called "community club", with the government of the city of Incheon being its key shareholder. The club's home stadium is the Incheon Football Stadium.

== History ==
=== Formation ===
Officially founded at the end of the 2003 season, the move to create a professional football club in Incheon had come about in part by the construction of the Incheon Munhak Stadium for the 2002 FIFA World Cup. Mayor of Incheon Ahn Sang-soo began the process of creating a new club in earnest in June 2003 with the official founding of Incheon FC. German Werner Lorant was appointed as manager in September of that year, assisted by Chang Woe-ryong and Kim Si-seok.

A public share issue was launched and ran from October to November 2003 and in December, the name Incheon United was adopted. Sponsorship contracts worth a total of $4m were signed with GM Daewoo and Daeduk Construction Company, while Puma supplied the club's kits.

=== Debut season ===
Lorant and his coaching staff recruited several high-profile players in a bid to make an impact on the league in the club's debut season in 2004. Goalkeeper Shim Bum-chul was recruited along with talented youngsters Choi Tae-uk, Kim Chi-woo and popular Japanese playmaker Masakiyo Maezono. The most high-profile of the imports was Turkish international defender Alpay Özalan, recruited from English Premier League side Aston Villa.

The club's first K-League match was a home encounter with Jeonbuk Hyundai Motors on 3 April 2004 which ended in a goalless draw. Their first league victory came in the third game of the season, also at home, as a Jasenko Sabitovic's own goal gave them a 1–0 victory over defending champions Seongnam Ilhwa Chunma.

Despite that promising start to the year, Incheon recorded just one more victory in the first stage of the season and finished bottom of the table on just nine points. Manager Lorant stepped down as manager at the end of August, and he was replaced in the hotseat by his assistant Chang Woe-Ryong as caretaker manager. Caretaker manager Chang Woe-Ryong made instant impacts on the side as the club finished fourth overall in the second stage of the league season, remaining in the race to claim victory in the stage until the final day.

=== Title challenge: "Fly Up" (2005) ===
Chang was confirmed as permanent Incheon manager in January 2005 as the club prepared to embark on what was to become a memorable season. The team finished as runners-up in the first stage of the league season and joint third in the second stage of the K League, qualifying for the post-season championship playoffs by virtue of having the best overall record. Incheon faced first stage winners Busan I'Park in the semi-finals, defeating them by a 2–0 scoreline to set up a championship final against Ulsan Hyundai Horang-i. In the first leg of the final at the Munhak stadium, goalkeeper Kim Lee-sub endured a torrid 90 minutes as Ulsan hit the back of the net five times, with Dženan Radončić netting a late consolation goal for the home side. Sung Kyung-mo replaced Kim in the Incheon goal for the second leg, and though United claimed a 2–1 victory they lost out on the title 6–3 on aggregate, but finished their second season in existence as K League runners-up. This season was reproduced in a film, as a documentary "Fly Up" (Korean: 비상) was released on 14 December 2006.

Incheon United also finished the 2005 season with the highest total and average home attendance in the league, with 316,591 spectators in total and an average of 24,353.

=== Crisis ===
After a remarkable 2005 season, Incheon United failed to continue its success. Although they reached semi-final in the FA Cup for two consecutive seasons in 2006 and 2007, they failed to make the playoff. Before the 2009 season, Incheon United appointed Ilija Petković, who had managed Serbia-Montenegro in the 2006 FIFA World Cup as their manager and finished 5th in the league, proceeding to the K League Championship. However, they lost to Seongnam Ilhwa Chunma in the first round after a penalty shoot-out.

In the middle of the 2010 season, Petković suddenly resigned due to his wife's health problems. Three months later, Incheon United appointed Huh Jung-moo, who had just led South Korea to the Round of 16 in the 2010 FIFA World Cup, as their next manager. In the 2010 season, Incheon United produced their first ever K League Top Scorer as striker Yoo Byung-soo managed to score 22 goals in 28 appearances, becoming the youngest player in the K League history to win the award.

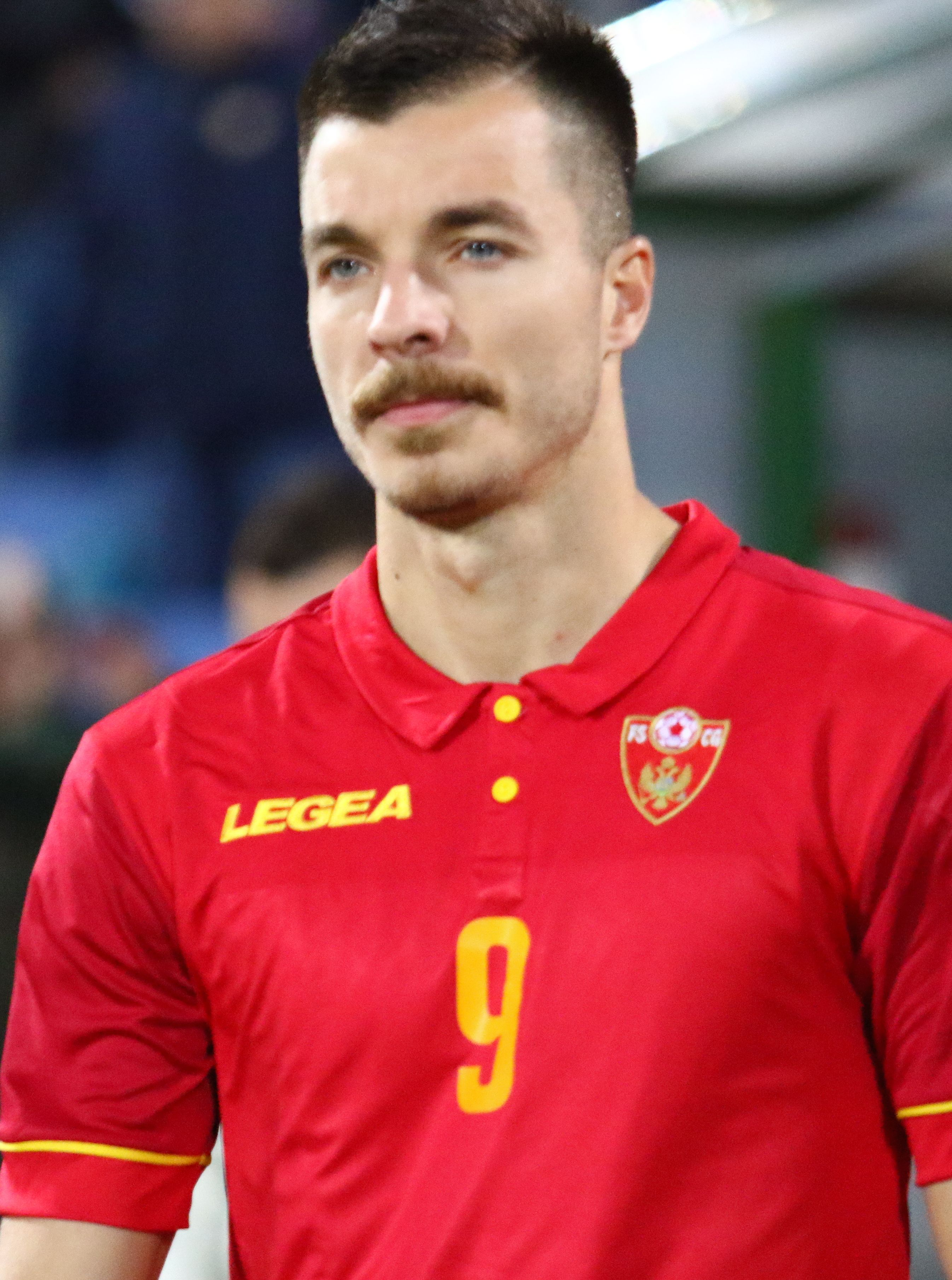
Montenegrin striker Stefan Mugoša is the club's all-time top scorer

Before the 2012 season, Incheon United unveiled their new uniform which used blue as the main color and red lines on the shoulder, instead of their traditional blue and black stripes. Although the club explained that the design was created based on the inaugural season's uniform, supporters were furious with the club's decision to abandon their traditional stripes. Incheon manager Huh Jung-moo also lost fans' support as he openly expressed disagreement with the fans' concern over the issue. Huh Jung-moo eventually resigned in the middle of the season after a poor start. Kim Bong-gil took over as a caretaker manager and on 16 July 2012, he was officially appointed as the manager of the club.

Meanwhile, Incheon United suffered from a financial crisis. Rumors about the city of Incheon trying to sell the club were published through media. According to the reports, the club had been suffering from a budget deficit for years and the city could not afford to spend more on the club because of the 2014 Asian Games. It was also later revealed that the club had been failing to pay the wages for the players on time for two months. As a consequence, key players were forced out, such as Jung In-whan, Jeong Hyuk, Lee Kyu-ro, Han Kyo-won, Kim Nam-il and Ivo. Despite the hardships, Kim Bong-gil managed to save the club from relegation. However, the club decided to sack him after the 2014 season.

Incheon planned to appoint Lee Lim-saeng as their next manager, but he eventually refused to take the seat as he was concerned with the club's controversial sacking of Kim Bong-gil.

=== Survival king era ===
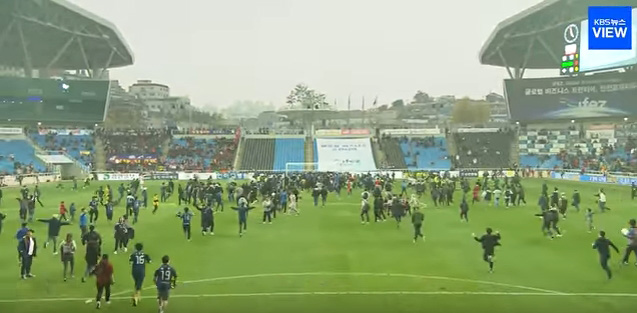
Incheon fans celebrate avoiding relegation in the 2016 season

Former striker Kim Do-hoon replaced Kim Bong-gil on 13 January 2015. In his debut season as a manager, he led Incheon to the FA Cup final, the first cup final for the club. Despite losing 3–1 to FC Seoul, the club was praised by the media and was dubbed the "wolves" for their teamwork and fighting spirit. Over the next several seasons, the club under several managers would go on to earn the 'survival king' nickname by both fans and media due to continuously narrowly avoiding relegation.

=== Debut in Asia and relegation ===
In the 2022 K League 1 season, Incheon finished fourth, qualifying them for the AFC Champions League for the first time. In their debut continental campaign in 2023–24, the club defeated 2022 J1 League champions Yokohama F. Marinos both at home and away. However, their consecutive defeats to Chinese Super League side Shandong Taishan left them unable to progress beyond the group stage.

The club ended the 2023 K League 1 season in fifth place, making them unable to qualify for a continental competition. In 2024, the club was relegated for the first time in its history, finishing in last place.

In December 2024, Incheon appointed Yoon Jong-hwan as their new manager, who led Gangwon FC to a historic second-place finish in 2024. After defeating Gyeongnam FC 3–0 at home, Incheon cliched the 2025 K League 2 title with three games to go and immediately returned to the top flight.

== Stadium ==
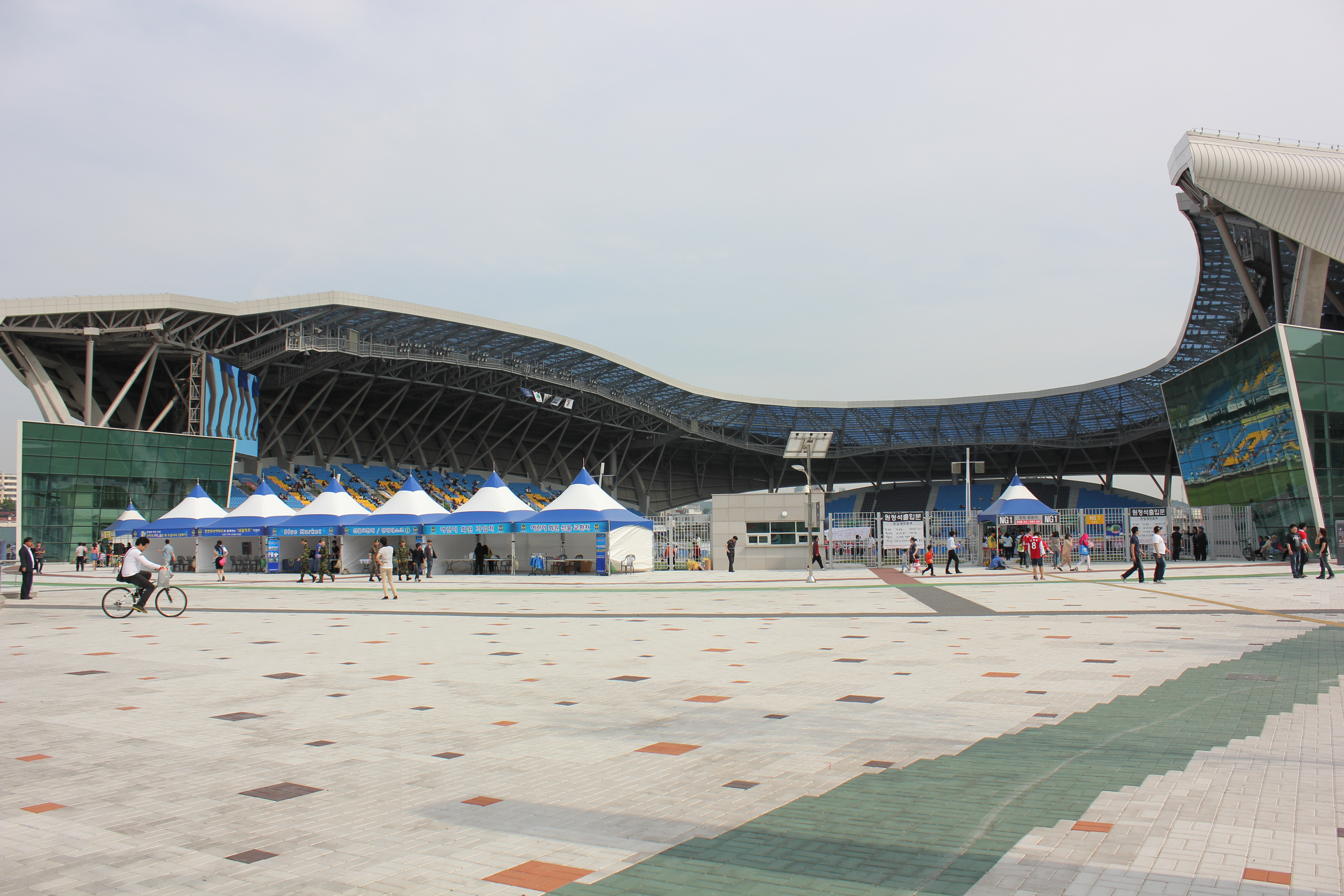
Entrance of the Incheon Football Stadium

Incheon United used Incheon Munhak Stadium, which was built for the 2002 FIFA World Cup, from its debut season to 2011. However, because it was built as a multi-purpose stadium, it was too large and did not provide a good view for spectators. Since the 2012 season, they have been using the 20,891-capacity Incheon Football Stadium, which was built for the 2014 Asian Games.

The club's modern training center, the IUFC Football Center (인천 유나이티드 FC 축구센터), opened in May 2022. Built in Yeonsu District at a cost of over 13 billion won, Incheon became the last top flight club to have its own training center.

== Supporters and rivalries ==
Incheon's official supporters' group is called 'blueblack' (파랑검정).

The club shares strong rivalries versus FC Seoul (Gyeongin Derby) and Suwon Samsung Bluewings (Suin Line Derby), two other clubs in the Seoul Metropolitan Area. Over 51,000 fans attended the Gyeongin Derby match in March 2024. In a home match against Seoul in May of the same year, fans threw water bottles at Seoul players, resulting in a fine for Incheon United.

The club's local rivalry is with Bucheon FC 1995, based in the neighboring city of Bucheon. The rivalry has been dubbed the '032 Derby', due to both Incheon and Bucheon sharing the 032 calling code.

== Current squad ==
As of 19 August 2026

Note: Flags indicate national team as defined under FIFA eligibility rules; some limited exceptions apply. Players may hold more than one non-FIFA nationality.

No.	Pos.	Nation	Player
1	GK	KOR	Kim Dong-heon (vice-captain)
2	DF	ESP	Juan Ibiza (on loan from Buriram United)
3	DF	KOR	Lee Sang-gi
4	DF	KOR	Kim Geon-hui
5	MF	KOR	Lee Myung-joo (captain)
6	MF	KOR	Mun Ji-hwan
7	MF	KOR	Oh Hu-seong
8	MF	ESP	Iker Undabarrena
9	FW	MNE	Stefan Mugoša
10	FW	KOR	Lee Dong-ryul
11	MF	GBS	Gerso Fernandes
13	DF	KOR	Choi Seung-gu
14	MF	KOR	Baek Min-gyu
15	MF	KOR	Seo Jae-min
17	MF	KOR	Kim Seong-min
20	DF	KOR	Park Gyeong-seop
21	GK	KOR	Lee Tae-hui

No.	Pos.	Nation	Player
22	DF	KOR	Go Jeong-min
23	MF	KOR	Jeong Chi-in
24	DF	KOR	Lee Jun-seop
26	MF	KOR	Lee Min-hyeok (on loan from Ulsan HD)
27	DF	KOR	Yeo Seung-won (on loan from Daejeon Hana Citizen)
28	DF	KOR	Kim Yeon-soo
30	MF	KOR	Kim Young-hwan (on loan from Jeonbuk Hyundai Motors)
32	DF	KOR	Lee Ju-yong (vice-captain)
39	DF	KOR	Kim Myung-soon (vice-captain)
55	MF	KOR	Oh Jun-yeop
70	MF	BRA	Leandro Ribeiro
72	MF	KOR	Lee Chung-yong
74	GK	KOR	Wang Min-jun
77	FW	KOR	Park Seung-ho
88	MF	KOR	Jung Won-jin
99	FW	GUY	Morgan Ferrier

=== Out on loan ===
Note: Flags indicate national team as defined under FIFA eligibility rules; some limited exceptions apply. Players may hold more than one non-FIFA nationality.

No.	Pos.	Nation	Player
—	GK	KOR	Lee Sang-hyeon (at Bucheon FC 1995)
—	DF	KOR	Hong Si-hoo (at Gimcheon Sangmu for military service)
—	DF	KOR	Kang Yeong-hun (at Gimcheon Sangmu for military service)

No.	Pos.	Nation	Player
—	DF	KOR	Min Kyeong-hyeon (at Gimcheon Sangmu for military service)
—	MF	KOR	Sung Him-chan (at FC Mokpo)

=== Retired number(s) ===
12 – Fans of the club (the 12th Man)

== Honours ==
- K League 1
  - Runners-up (1): 2005
- K League 2
  - Winners (1): 2025
- Korean FA Cup
  - Runners-up (1): 2015

== Season-by-season records ==
=== Domestic record ===
Season	Division	Teams	Pos.	Cup
2004	1	13	12	Round of 32
2005	1	13	2	Round of 16
2006	1	14	9	Semi-final
2007	1	14	9	Semi-final
2008	1	14	7	Round of 32
2009	1	15	6	Round of 32
2010	1	15	11	Quarter-final
2011	1	16	13	Round of 16
2012	1	16	9	Round of 16
2013	1	14	7	Quarter-final
2014	1	12	10	Round of 32
2015	1	12	8	Runners-up
2016	1	12	10	Quarter-final
2017	1	12	9	Round of 32
2018	1	12	9	Round of 16
2019	1	12	10	Round of 32
2020	1	12	11	Third round
2021	1	12	8	Third round
2022	1	12	4	Third round
2023	1	12	5	Semi-final
2024	1	12	12	Quarter-final
2025	2	14	1	Round of 16

=== Continental record ===
All results list Incheon United's goal tally first.

Season	Competition	Round	Opponent	Home	Away	Aggregate
2023–24	AFC Champions League	Play-off round	(Vietnam) Haiphong	3–1 (a.e.t.)		
2023–24	AFC Champions League	Group G	(Japan) Yokohama F. Marinos	2–1	4–2	3rd out of 4 (eliminated)
2023–24	AFC Champions League	Group G	(Philippines) Kaya–Iloilo	4–0	3–1	3rd out of 4 (eliminated)
2023–24	AFC Champions League	Group G	(China) Shandong Taishan	0–2	1–3	3rd out of 4 (eliminated)

== Managers ==
No.	Name	From	To	Season(s)
1	(Germany) Werner Lorant	2003/09/25	2004/08/30	2004
C	(South Korea) Chang Woe-ryong	2004/08/31	2005/01/02	2004
2	(South Korea) Chang Woe-ryong	2005/01/03	2006/12/28	2005–2006
C	(South Korea) Park Lee-chun	2007/01/04	2007/12/20	2007
2	(South Korea) Chang Woe-ryong	2007/12/21	2008/12/09	2008
3	(Serbia) Ilija Petković	2009/01/29	2010/06/08	2009–2010
C	(South Korea) Kim Bong-gil	2010/06/27	2010/08/21	2010
4	(South Korea) Huh Jung-moo	2010/08/23	2012/04/11	2010–2012
C	(South Korea) Kim Bong-gil	2012/04/12	2012/07/15	2012
5	(South Korea) Kim Bong-gil	2012/07/16	2014/12/19	2012–2014
6	(South Korea) Kim Do-hoon	2015/01/13	2016/08/31	2015–2016
C	(South Korea) Lee Ki-hyung	2016/08/31	2016/11/29	2016
7	(South Korea) Lee Ki-hyung	2016/11/29	2018/05/11	2017–2018
C	(South Korea) Park Sung-chul	2018/05/11	2018/06/02	2018
8	(Norway) Jørn Andersen	2018/06/09	2019/04/15	2018–2019
C	(South Korea) Lim Joong-yong	2019/04/15	2019/05/14	2019
9	(South Korea) Yoo Sang-chul	2019/05/14	2020/01/02	2019
10	(South Korea) Lim Wan-sup	2020/02/06	2020/06/28	2020
C	(South Korea) Lim Joong-yong	2020/06/29	2020/08/06	2020
11	(South Korea) Jo Sung-hwan	2020/08/07	2024/07/05	2020–2024
C	(South Korea) Byun Jae-sub	2024/07/06	2024/07/31	2024
12	(South Korea) Choi Young-keun	2024/08/01	2024/12/21	2024
13	(South Korea) Yoon Jong-hwan	2024/12/22	present	2025–

== See also ==
- List of South Korean football clubs
