= 2011 Pohang Steelers season =

Pohang Steelers
2011 season
- Chairman: Kim Tae-Man
- Manager: Hwang Sun-Hong
- K-League: 3rd
- Korean FA Cup: Semifinal
- League Cup: Quarterfinal
- Top goalscorer: League: Mota (13); All: Mota (16)
- Highest home attendance: 21,317 vs Ulsan (November 26)
- Lowest home attendance: 1,820 vs Ulsan Mipo (June 15)
- Average home league attendance: 12,146
Home colours	Away colours

The 2011 season was Pohang Steelers's twenty-ninth season in the K-League in South Korea. Pohang Steelers will be competing in K-League, League Cup and Korean FA Cup.

== Players ==
=== Squad ===
Note: Flags indicate national team as defined under FIFA eligibility rules; some limited exceptions apply. Players may hold more than one non-FIFA nationality.

No.	Pos.	Nation	Player
1	GK	KOR	Shin Hwa-Yong
2	MF	KOR	Park Hee-Chul
3	DF	KOR	Kim Gwang-Seok
5	DF	KOR	Lee Won-Jae
6	MF	KOR	Kim Gi-Dong
7	MF	KOR	Kim Jae-Sung
8	MF	KOR	Hwang Jin-Sung
10	FW	GHA	Derek Asamoah
11	FW	BRA	Mota
12	GK	KOR	Hwang Kyo-Chung
13	DF	KOR	Kim Won-Il
14	MF	KOR	Kim Tae-Su
15	DF	KOR	Jung Hong-Youn
16	MF	KOR	Kim Jung-Kyum
17	DF	KOR	Shin Kwang-Hoon
18	FW	KOR	Ko Moo-Yeol
19	FW	KOR	Kim Sun-Woo
20	MF	KOR	Shin Hyung-Min
21	GK	KOR	Song Dong-Jin
22	FW	KOR	No Byung-Jun

No.	Pos.	Nation	Player
24	MF	KOR	Kim Dae-Ho
25	MF	KOR	Kang Jong-Koo
26	FW	KOR	Cho Chan-Ho
27	FW	BRA	Adriano Chuva
28	DF	KOR	An Il-Joo
29	MF	KOR	Shin Jin-Ho
30	FW	KOR	Jeong Jung-Seok
31	GK	KOR	Kim Da-Sol
32	DF	KOR	Kim Hyung-Il (captain)
33	MF	KOR	Kim Jung-Bin
34	MF	KOR	Yoon Won-Il
35	MF	KOR	Hwang Jung-Soo
36	FW	KOR	Kim Dong-Hee
37	DF	KOR	Kang Dae-Ho
39	MF	KOR	Lee Sang-Hoon
40	DF	KOR	Kim Dong-Kwon
44	FW	KOR	Kim Do-Hoon
66	MF	KOR	Lee Seul-Gi
77	MF	KOR	Jeong Seok-Min

== Match results ==
=== K-League ===
Date Round	Home	Score	Away	Location

5 March 1	Pohang Steelers	1–1	Seongnam Ilhwa Chunma	Pohang, Gyeongbuk
15:00 UTC+9	Mota 3'	Report	Kim Jin-Yong 59'	Stadium: Steelyard Stadium; Attendance: 17,353; Referee: Yoo Seon-Ho

13 March 2	Chunnam Dragons	0–1	Pohang Steelers	Gwangyang, Jeonnam
15:00 UTC+9		Report	Asamoah 78'	Stadium: Gwangyang Stadium; Attendance: 19,247; Referee: Choi Myung-Yong

20 March 3	Pohang Steelers	2–0	Suwon Samsung Bluewings	Pohang, Gyeongbuk
15:00 UTC+9	Kim Jae-Sung 19'; Shin Hyung-Min 87'	Report		Stadium: Steelyard Stadium; Attendance: 14,812; Referee: Lee Sam-Ho

2 April 4	Gwangju	0–1	Pohang Steelers	Seo-gu, Gwangju
15:00 UTC+9		Report	Shin Hyung-Min 54'	Stadium: Gwangju World Cup Stadium; Attendance: 15,627; Referee: Choi Myung-Yong

9 April 5	Pohang Steelers	2–2	Incheon United	Pohang, Gyeongbuk
15:00 UTC+9	Hwang Jin-Sung 4', 48'	Report	Kapadze 34'; Yoo Byung-Soo 83'	Stadium: Steelyard Stadium; Attendance: 16,762; Referee: Lee Sang-Yong

16 April 6	Jeju United	1–3	Pohang Steelers	Seogwipo, Jeju
15:00 UTC+9	Kim In-Ho 47'; Kang Min-hyuk (red card) 73'	Report	Hwang Jin-Sung 12', 73' (pen.); No Byung-Jun 30'	Stadium: Jeju World Cup Stadium; Attendance: 2,078; Referee: Lee Min-Hu

23 April 7	Pohang Steelers	2–0	Ulsan Hyundai	Pohang, Gyeongbuk
15:00 UTC+9	Cho Chan-Ho 78'; Chuva 84'	Report		Stadium: Steelyard Stadium; Attendance: 14,394; Referee: Choi Kwang-Bo

30 April 8	Pohang Steelers	0–0	Gangwon	Pohang, Gyeongbuk
15:00 UTC+9		Report		Stadium: Steelyard Stadium; Attendance: 10,466; Referee: Kim Sung-Ho

8 May 9	Busan I'Park	2–1	Pohang Steelers	Yeonje-gu, Busan
17:00 UTC+9	Kim Chang-Soo 31'; Han Sang-Woon 44'	Report	Mota 45+1'	Stadium: Busan Asiad Stadium; Attendance: 10,272; Referee: Ko Keum-Bok

15 May 10	Pohang Steelers	3–2	Jeonbuk Hyundai Motors	Pohang, Gyeongbuk
15:00 UTC+9	Shin Hyung-Min 56'; Chuva 72', 79' (pen.)	Report	Jung Hoon (yellow card) 23' (yellow-red card) 64'; Lee Dong-Gook 37'; Park Won-Jae 42'	Stadium: Steelyard Stadium; Attendance: 16,732; Referee: Choi Kwang-Bo

22 May 11	Daejeon Citizen	0–0	Pohang Steelers	Yuseong-gu, Daejeon
15:00 UTC+9		Report		Stadium: Daejeon World Cup Stadium; Attendance: 31,423; Referee: Kim Sang-Woo

28 May 12	Pohang Steelers	2–2	Daegu	Pohang, Gyeongbuk
15:00 UTC+9	Kim Jae-Sung 6'; Kim Gi-Dong 18' (pen.)	Report	An Sung-Min 37'; Quirino 44'	Stadium: Steelyard Stadium; Attendance: 14,469; Referee: Lee Jong-Guk

11 June 13	FC Seoul	1–1	Pohang Steelers	Mapo-gu, Seoul
20:00 UTC+9	Damjanović 8'	Report	Hwang Jin-Sung 46'	Stadium: Seoul World Cup Stadium; Attendance: 44,358; Referee: Choi Kwang-Bo

18 June 14	Pohang Steelers	4–3	Sangju Sangmu Phoenix	Pohang, Gyeongbuk
19:00 UTC+9	Ko Mu-Yeol 48'; Kim Tae-Su 72'; Mota 76' (pen.); Asamoah 87'	Report	Kim Jung-Woo 13' (pen.); Jang Nam-Seok 37'; Ko Cha-Won 45+4'	Stadium: Steelyard Stadium; Attendance: 12,254; Referee: Lee Jong-Guk

25 June 15	Gyeongnam	2–3	Pohang Steelers	Changwon, Gyeongnam
19:00 UTC+9	Lee Hun 29'; Yoon Il-Rok 64'	Report	Asamoah 23'; Mota 55', 69'	Stadium: Changwon Football Center; Attendance: 1,214; Referee: Yoo Seon-Ho

2 July 16	Suwon Samsung Bluewings	2–1	Pohang Steelers	Suwon, Gyeonggi
19:30 UTC+9	Marcel 3', 67'	Report	Kim Jae-Sung 44'	Stadium: Suwon World Cup Stadium; Attendance: 27,152; Referee: Choi Kwang-Bo

9 July 17	Pohang Steelers	7–0	Daejeon Citizen	Pohang, Gyeongbuk
19:00 UTC+9	Kim Jae-Sung 5'; Hwang Jin-Sung 30'; Mota 31', 37'; Shin Kwang-Hoon 55'; Ko Mu-Yeol 69'; Kim Gi-Dong 88' (pen.)	Report		Stadium: Steelyard Stadium; Attendance: 5,473; Referee: Ryu Hee-Seon

17 July 18	Pohang Steelers	1–2	FC Seoul	Pohang, Gyeongbuk
19:00 UTC+9	Ko Mu-Yeol 33'	Report	Damjanović 7', 23'	Stadium: Steelyard Stadium; Attendance: 18,115; Referee: Choi Kwang-Bo

23 July 19	Daegu	1–1	Pohang Steelers	Buk-gu, Daegu
19:00 UTC+9	Song Je-Heon (yellow card) 17' (red card) 85'; Kim Hyun-Sung 90+1'	Report	Kim Jae-Sung 42'; Shin Hyung-Min (yellow card) 63' (yellow-red card) 89'	Stadium: Daegu Civil Stadium; Attendance: 5,427; Referee: Moon Jin-Hee

6 August 20	Pohang Steelers	3–2	Busan I'Park	Pohang, Gyeongbuk
19:00 UTC+9	Lee Dong-Won 15' (o.g.); Ko Mu-Yeol 18'; Asamoah 83'	Report	Lim Sang-Hyub 38'; Fagner 88' (pen.)	Stadium: Steelyard Stadium; Attendance: 16,355; Referee: Ko Keum-Bok

13 August 21	Gangwon	0–2	Pohang Steelers	Gangneung, Gangwon
19:00 UTC+9		Report	Ko Moo-Yeol 49'; Asamoah 59'	Stadium: Gangneung Stadium; Attendance: 2,240; Referee: Lee Sang-Yong

21 August 22	Jeonbuk Hyundai Motors	3–1	Pohang Steelers	Jeonju, Jeonbuk
19:00 UTC+9	Lee Dong-Gook 64' (pen.), 78', 90+1'	Report	Shin Kwang-Hoon (yellow card) 44' (yellow-red card) 62'; No Byung-Jun 68'	Stadium: Jeonju World Cup Stadium; Attendance: 21,253; Referee: Kim Sung-Ho

27 August 23	Pohang Steelers	1–0	Gyeongnam	Pohang, Gyeongbuk
19:00 UTC+9	No Byung-Jun 76'	Report		Stadium: Steelyard Stadium; Attendance: 15,359; Referee: Choi Myung-Yong

10 September 24	Pohang Steelers	5–1	Gwangju	Pohang, Gyeongbuk
17:00 UTC+9	Mota 35' (pen.), 51'; Ko Moo-Yeol 55', 67'; No Byung-Jun 83'	Report	Park Gi-Dong 38'; Yoo Jong-Hyun (yellow card) 28' (yellow-red card) 34'	Stadium: Steelyard Stadium; Attendance: 10,165; Referee: Lee Min-Hu

17 September 25	Incheon United	0–1	Pohang Steelers	Seo-gu, Incheon
19:00 UTC+9		Report	Mota 6' (pen.)	Stadium: Incheon Munhak Stadium; Attendance: 6,728; Referee: Choi Myung-Yong

25 September 26	Sangju Sangmu Phoenix	1–3	Pohang Steelers	Sangju, Gyeongbuk
15:00 UTC+9	Kim Yong-Tae 73'	Report	Adriano Chuva 22'; Mota 43'; Shin Hyung-Min 87'	Stadium: Sangju Stadium; Attendance: 4,352; Referee: Ahn Yong-Hee

2 October 27	Pohang Steelers	2–1	Jeju United	Pohang, Gyeongbuk
15:00 UTC+9	Asamoah 3'; Mota 22'	Report	Santos 64'	Stadium: Steelyard Stadium; Attendance: 12,139; Referee: Yoo Sun-Ho

16 October 28	Ulsan Hyundai	2–1	Pohang Steelers	Nam-gu, Ulsan
17:00 UTC+9	Go Seul-Ki 21'; Ko Chang-Hyun 90+2'	Report	Asamoah 82'	Stadium: Munsu Cup Stadium; Attendance: 23,875; Referee: Choi Kwang-Bo

22 October 29	Pohang Steelers	1–1	Chunnam Dragons	Pohang, Gyeongbuk
15:00 UTC+9	Mota 89'	Report	Lee Jong-Ho 53' (yellow card) 57' (yellow-red card) 77'; Cornthwaite (red card) 90+1'	Stadium: Steelyard Stadium; Attendance: 10,362; Referee: Yoo Sun-Ho

30 October 30	Seongnam Ilhwa Chunma	1–3	Pohang Steelers	Seongnam, Gyeonggi
15:00 UTC+9	Ognenovski 57' (pen.)	Report	Ko Mu-Yeol 55', 71' (pen.); Cho Chan-Ho 74'	Stadium: Tancheon Sports Complex; Attendance: 3,211; Referee: Choi Myung-Yong

==== League table ====
Pos	Team	Pld	W	D	L	GF	GA	GD	Pts	Qualification
1	Jeonbuk Hyundai Motors	30	18	9	3	67	32	+35	63	Qualification for the K League playoffs final
2	Pohang Steelers	30	17	8	5	59	33	+26	59	Qualification for the K League playoffs semi-final
3	FC Seoul	30	16	7	7	56	38	+18	55	Qualification for the K League playoffs first round
4	Suwon Samsung Bluewings	30	17	4	9	51	33	+18	55	Qualification for the K League playoffs first round
5	Busan IPark	30	13	7	10	49	43	+6	46	Qualification for the K League playoffs first round

Source: K League
Rules for classification: 1) Points; 2) Goal difference; 3) Goals scored

Pos	Team	Qualification
1	Jeonbuk Hyundai Motors (C)	Qualification for the Champions League group stage
2	Ulsan Hyundai	Qualification for the Champions League group stage
3	Pohang Steelers	Qualification for the Champions League playoff round
4	Suwon Samsung Bluewings	
5	FC Seoul	
6	Busan IPark	

Source: RSSSF
(C) Champions

==== Results summary ====
Overall								Home						Away					
Pld	W	D	L	GF	GA	GD	Pts	W	D	L	GF	GA	GD	W	D	L	GF	GA	GD
30	17	8	5	59	33	+26	59	10	3	1	36	17	+19	7	5	4	23	16	+7

==== Results by round ====
Round	1	2	3	4	5	6	7	8	9	10	11	12	13	14	15	16	17	18	19	20	21	22	23	24	25	26	27	28	29	30
Ground	H	A	H	A	H	A	H	H	A	H	A	H	A	H	A	A	H	H	A	H	A	A	H	H	A	A	H	A	H	A
Result	D	W	W	W	D	W	W	D	L	W	D	D	D	W	W	L	W	L	D	W	W	L	W	W	W	W	W	L	D	W
Position	8	5	3	2	2	1	1	1	2	1	2	2	2	2	2	2	2	2	2	2	2	2	2	2	2	2	2	2	2	2

Updated to match(es) played on 30 October 2011. Source: League Fixtures and Results
A = Away; H = Home; W = Win; D = Draw; L = Loss

=== K-League Championship ===
26 November Semifinal	Pohang Steelers	0–1	Ulsan Hyundai	Pohang, Gyeongbuk
15:00 UTC+9		Report	Seol Ki-Hyeon 72' (pen.)	Stadium: Steelyard Stadium; Attendance: 21,317; Referee: Ko Keum-Bok

=== Korean FA Cup ===
18 May Round of 32	Pohang Steelers	2–0	Daejeon KHNP	Pohang, Gyeongbuk
19:30 UTC+9	Ko Mu-Yeol 26'; Cho Chan-Ho 82'			Stadium: Steelyard Stadium; Attendance: 2,596; Referee: Park Byung-Jin

15 June Round of 16	Pohang Steelers	1–0	Ulsan Hyundai Mipo Dockyard	Pohang, Gyeongbuk
19:30 UTC+9	Mota 25'			Stadium: Steelyard Stadium; Attendance: 1,820; Referee: Kim Dae-Yong

27 July Quarterfinal	Pohang Steelers	4–2 (a.e.t.)	Seoul	Pohang, Gyeongbuk
19:30 UTC+9	Asamoah 31'; Mota 64'; No Byung-Jun 99'; No Byung-Jun 99', 108'		Damjanović 51'; Molina 73'; Adilson (yellow card) 8' (yellow-red card) 117'	Stadium: Steelyard Stadium; Attendance: 10,419; Referee: Lee Dong-Joon

24 August Semifinal	Seongnam Ilhwa Chunma	3–0	Pohang Steelers	Seongnam, Gyeonggi
19:30 UTC+9	Ognenovski 39'; Cho Dong-Geon 45'; Radončić 65'			Stadium: Tancheon Sports Complex; Attendance: 5,752; Referee: Kim Sang-Woo

=== League Cup ===
16 March Group round	Pohang Steelers	2–0	Seongnam Ilhwa Chunma	Pohang, Gyeongbuk
19:30 UTC+9	Jeong Seok-Min 57'; Kim Tae-Su 66'	Report		Stadium: Steelyard Stadium; Attendance: 7,211; Referee: Kim Jong-Hyuk

6 April Group round	Daejeon Citizen	0–3	Pohang Steelers	Yuseong-gu, Daejeon
19:30 UTC+9	Kim Do-yeon (yellow card) 39' (yellow-red card) 74'; Yang Jung-Min (yellow card) 47' (red card) 90'	Report	Chuva 17', 23'; No Byung-Jun 84'	Stadium: Daejeon World Cup Stadium; Attendance: 4,785; Referee: Choi Kwang-Bo

20 April Group round	Pohang Steelers	0–1	Daegu	Pohang, Gyeongbuk
19:30 UTC+9		Report	Hwang Il-Su 10'	Stadium: Steelyard Stadium; Attendance: 7,817; Referee: Lim Won-Taek

5 May Group round	Pohang Steelers	4–1	Incheon United	Pohang, Gyeongbuk
14:00 UTC+9	Ko Mu-Yeol 8'; Cho Chan-Ho 10', 27'; Kim Gi-Dong 34'	Report	Luizinho 86' (pen.)	Stadium: Steelyard Stadium; Attendance: 16,671; Referee: Yoo Seon-Ho

11 May Group round	Gyeongnam	1–2	Pohang Steelers	Changwon, Gyeongnam
15:00 UTC+9	Ahn Hyun-Sik 66'	Report	Kim Gi-Dong 26' (pen.); Mota 79'	Stadium: Changwon Football Center; Attendance: 961; Referee: Lim Won-Taek

29 June Quarterfinal	Pohang Steelers	1–2	Busan I'Park	Pohang, Gyeongbuk
19:30 UTC+9	Jeong Seok-Min 68'	Report	Yoon Dong-Min 10'; Park Hee-Do 19'	Stadium: Steelyard Stadium; Attendance: 6,288; Referee: Woo Sang-Il

== Squad statistics ==
=== Appearances and goals ===
Statistics accurate as of match played 26 November 2011
Numbers in parentheses denote appearances as substitute.

No.	Nat.	Pos.	Name	League		FA Cup		League Cup		Total	
No.	Nat.	Pos.	Name	Apps	Goals	Apps	Goals	Apps	Goals	Apps	Goals
1	KOR	GK	Shin Hwa-Yong	24	0	4	0	5	0	33 (0)	0
2	KOR	MF	Park Hee-Chul	13 (1)	0	1 (1)	0	2	0	16 (2)	0
3	KOR	DF	Kim Gwang-Seok	31	0	4	0	3	0	38 (0)	0
5	KOR	DF	Lee Won-Jae	0 (2)	0	0	0	0 (1)	0	0 (3)	0
6	KOR	MF	Kim Gi-Dong	2 (12)	2	0 (1)	0	5	2	7 (13)	4
7	KOR	MF	Kim Jae-Sung	28 (1)	5	3	0	0 (1)	0	31 (2)	5
8	KOR	MF	Hwang Jin-Sung	24 (3)	6	3 (1)	0	3	0	30 (4)	6
10	GHA	FW	Derek Asamoah	24 (3)	7	4	1	2 (2)	0	30 (5)	8
11	BRA	FW	Mota	26 (2)	13	3 (1)	2	0 (3)	1	29 (6)	16
12	KOR	GK	Hwang Kyo-Chung	0 (1)	0	0	0	0	0	0 (1)	0
13	KOR	DF	Kim Won-Il	14 (4)	0	2	0	5	0	21 (4)	0
14	KOR	MF	Kim Tae-Su	16 (6)	1	2	0	2	1	20 (6)	2
15	KOR	DF	Jung Hong-Youn	1 (3)	0	1	0	6	0	8 (3)	0
17	KOR	DF	Shin Kwang-Hoon	25	1	3	0	1	0	29 (0)	1
18	KOR	FW	Ko Moo-Yeol	17 (7)	9	4	1	3 (1)	1	24 (8)	11
19	KOR	DF	Kim Sun-Woo	0 (1)	0	0	0	0	0	0 (1)	0
20	KOR	MF	Shin Hyung-Min	28	4	3	0	0	0	31 (0)	4
21	KOR	GK	Song Dong-Jin	0	0	0	0	0	0	0	0
22	KOR	FW	No Byung-Jun	9 (20)	4	1 (3)	2	3 (2)	1	13 (25)	7
24	KOR	MF	Kim Dae-Ho	11 (1)	0	2	0	1	0	14 (1)	0
25	KOR	MF	Kang Jong-Koo	0	0	0	0	0 (1)	0	0 (1)	0
26	KOR	FW	Cho Chan-Ho	6 (14)	2	0 (3)	1	6	2	12 (17)	5
27	BRA	FW	Adriano Chuva	7 (5)	4	0 (2)	0	2 (1)	2	9 (8)	6
28	KOR	DF	An Il-Joo	0	0	0	0	0	0	0	0
29	KOR	MF	Shin Jin-Ho	1 (1)	0	0 (1)	0	1 (3)	0	2 (5)	0
30	KOR	FW	Jeong Jung-Seok	0	0	0	0	0	0	0	0
31	KOR	GK	Kim Da-Sol	7	0	0	0	1	0	8 (0)	0
32	KOR	DF	Kim Hyung-Il	17 (2)	0	4	0	2	0	23 (2)	0
33	KOR	MF	Kim Jung-Bin	0	0	0	0	0	0	0	0
34	KOR	MF	Yoon Won-Il	1	0	0	0	0	0	1 (0)	0
35	KOR	MF	Hwang Jung-Soo	0	0	0	0	0	0	0	0
36	KOR	FW	Kim Dong-Hee	0	0	0	0	0 (1)	0	0 (1)	0
37	KOR	DF	Kang Dae-Ho	0	0	0	0	0	0	0	0
39	KOR	MF	Lee Sang-Hoon	0	0	0	0	0	0	0	0
40	KOR	DF	Kim Dong-Kwon	0	0	0	0	0	0	0	0
44	KOR	FW	Kim Do-Hoon	0	0	0	0	0	0	0	0
66	KOR	MF	Lee Seul-Gi	0 (1)	0	0	0	4	0	4 (1)	0
77	KOR	MF	Jeong Seok-Min	0 (2)	0	0	0	4 (2)	2	4 (4)	2
16	KOR	MF	Kim Jung-Kyum (out)	8	0	0	0	1	0	9 (0)	0
19	KOR	FW	Lee Gi-Dong (out)	0	0	0	0	1	0	1 (0)	0
23	KOR	DF	Jang Hyun-Kyu (out)	1 (1)	0	0	0	3	0	4 (1)	0
42	KOR	FW	Choi Hyun-Yeon (out)	0	0	0	0	0	0	0	0

=== Top scorers ===
Rank	Nation	Number	Name	K-League	KFA Cup	League Cup	Total
1	(Brazil)	11	Mota	13	2	1	16
2	(South Korea)	18	Ko Moo-Yeol	9	1	1	11
3	(Ghana)	10	Derek Asamoah	7	1	0	8
4	(South Korea)	22	No Byung-Jun	4	2	1	7
5	(South Korea)	8	Hwang Jin-Sung	6	0	0	6
=	(Brazil)	27	Adriano Chuva	4	0	2	6
6	(South Korea)	7	Kim Jae-Sung	5	0	0	5
=	(South Korea)	26	Cho Chan-Ho	2	1	2	5
7	(South Korea)	20	Shin Hyung-Min	4	0	0	4
=	(South Korea)	6	Kim Gi-Dong	2	0	2	4
8	(South Korea)	14	Kim Tae-Su	1	0	1	2
=	(South Korea)	77	Jeong Seok-Min	0	0	2	2
9	(South Korea)	17	Shin Kwang-Hoon	1	0	0	1
/	/	/	Own Goals	1	0	0	1
/	/	/	TOTALS	59	7	12	78

=== Top assistors ===
Rank	Nation	Number	Name	K-League	KFA Cup	League Cup	Total
1	(South Korea)	8	Hwang Jin-Sung	6	0	3	9
2	(Brazil)	11	Mota	8	0	0	8
3	(Ghana)	10	Derek Asamoah	5	1	0	6
4	(South Korea)	17	Shin Kwang-Hoon	4	1	0	5
5	(South Korea)	7	Kim Jae-Sung	4	0	0	4
6	(South Korea)	18	Ko Moo-Yeol	3	0	0	3
=	(Brazil)	27	Adriano Chuva	3	0	0	3
7	(South Korea)	22	No Byung-Jun	2	0	0	2
=	(South Korea)	26	Cho Chan-Ho	1	0	1	2
=	(South Korea)	13	Kim Won-Il	0	1	1	2
8	(South Korea)	14	Kim Tae-Su	1	0	0	1
=	(South Korea)	20	Shin Hyung-Min	1	0	0	1
=	(South Korea)	2	Park Hee-Chul	0	0	1	1
=	(South Korea)	6	Kim Gi-Dong	0	0	1	1
=	(South Korea)	29	Shin Jin-Ho	0	0	1	1
/	/	/	TOTALS	38	3	8	49

=== Discipline ===
Position	Nation	Number	Name	K-League		KFA Cup		League Cup		Total	
Position	Nation	Number	Name	Booked	Sent off (straight red)	Booked	Sent off (straight red)	Booked	Sent off (straight red)	Booked	Sent off (straight red)
GK	(South Korea)	1	Shin Hwa-Yong	1	0	0	0	1	0	2	0
MF	(South Korea)	2	Park Hee-Chul	4	0	0	0	0	0	4	0
MF	(South Korea)	7	Kim Jae-Sung	8	0	0	0	0	0	8	0
MF	(South Korea)	8	Hwang Jin-Sung	5	0	0	0	0	0	5	0
FW	(Ghana)	10	Derek Asamoah	3	0	0	0	0	0	3	0
FW	(Brazil)	11	Mota	8	0	1	0	2	0	11	0
DF	(South Korea)	13	Kim Won-Il	7	0	1	0	1	0	9	0
MF	(South Korea)	14	Kim Tae-Su	2	0	0	0	0	0	2	0
MF	(South Korea)	15	Jung Hong-Youn	1	0	0	0	0	0	1	0
MF	(South Korea)	16	Kim Jung-Kyum	2	0	0	0	0	0	2	0
DF	(South Korea)	17	Shin Kwang-Hoon	9	1	2	0	1	0	12	1
FW	(South Korea)	18	Ko Moo-Yeol	1	0	1	0	1	0	3	0
MF	(South Korea)	20	Shin Hyung-Min	7	1	0	0	0	0	7	1
FW	(South Korea)	22	No Byung-Jun	0	0	0	0	2	0	2	0
DF	(South Korea)	23	Jang Hyun-Kyu	1	0	0	0	0	0	1	0
MF	(South Korea)	24	Kim Dae-Ho	1	0	1	0	0	0	2	0
FW	(Brazil)	27	Adriano Chuva	1	0	0	0	0	0	1	0
MF	(South Korea)	29	Shin Jin-Ho	1	0	0	0	1	0	2	0
DF	(South Korea)	32	Kim Hyung-Il	2	0	0	0	1	0	3	0
MF	(South Korea)	34	Yoon Won-Il	1	0	0	0	0	0	1	0
MF	(South Korea)	66	Lee Seul-Gi	0	0	0	0	2	0	2	0
MF	(South Korea)	77	Jeong Seok-Min	0	0	0	0	2	0	2	0
/	/	/	TOTALS	65	2	6	0	14	0	85	2

== Transfer ==
=== In ===
Note: Flags indicate national team as defined under FIFA eligibility rules; some limited exceptions apply. Players may hold more than one non-FIFA nationality.

No.	Pos.	Nation	Player
10	FW	GHA	Derek Asamoah (Transferred from Lokomotiv Sofia)
22	FW	KOR	No Byung-Jun (Loan return from Ulsan Hyundai)
25	MF	KOR	Kang Jong-Koo (Drafted from Dongeui University)
27	FW	BRA	Adriano Chuva (Transferred from Chunnam Dragons)
28	DF	KOR	Ahn Il-Joo (Drafted from Dongguk University)
35	DF	KOR	Hwang Jung-Soo (Drafted from Kwangwoon University)
33	MF	KOR	Kim Jung-Bin (Drafted from Sunmoon University)
36	FW	KOR	Kim Dong-Hee (Drafted from Yonsei University)
40	DF	KOR	Kim Dong-Kwon (Drafted from Chunggu High School)
66	MF	KOR	Lee Seul-Gi (Transferred from Daegu FC)
—	DF	KOR	Yoon Won-Il (Free agent)
—	FW	KOR	Kim Sun-Woo (Transferred from Ulsan Mipo Dockyard)

=== Out ===
Note: Flags indicate national team as defined under FIFA eligibility rules; some limited exceptions apply. Players may hold more than one non-FIFA nationality.

No.	Pos.	Nation	Player
—	FW	KOR	Lee Jin-Ho (Loan return to Ulsan Hyundai)
—	FW	BRA	Zulu (Transferred to Juventude)
—	FW	KOR	Song Chang-Ho (Transferred to Daegu FC)
—	DF	KOR	Ahn Tae-Eun (Transferred to Incheon United FC)
—	FW	KOR	Lee Gi-Dong (Transferred to Ulsan Hyundai)
—	MF	KOR	Kim Beom-Joon (Loan to Sangju Sangmu for military service)
—	FW	KOR	Lee Sung-Jae (Loan to Sangju Sangmu for military service)
—	FW	KOR	Yoo Chang-Hyun (Loan to Sangju Sangmu for military service)
—	FW	JPN	Kazunari Okayama (Released)
—	FW	BRA	Almir (Released)
—	GK	KOR	Kim Dae-Ho (Released)
—	DF	KOR	Han Ma-Ro (Released)
—	MF	KOR	Kang Dae-Ho (Released)
—	FW	KOR	Seol Ki-Hyeon (Contract expires)
—	MF	KOR	Kim Jung-Kyum (Released)
—	DF	KOR	Jang Hyun-Kyu (under indictment (7 July 2011))
—	FW	KOR	Lee Gi-Dong (Transferred to Ulsan Hyundai FC)
—	FW	KOR	Choi Hyun-Youn (Released)
