= 2010 Pohang Steelers season =

Pohang Steelers
2010 season
- Chairman: Kim Tae-Man
- Manager: (Brazil) Waldemar Lemos
- K-League: 9th
- Korean FA Cup: Round of 16
- League Cup: Group Round
- Champions League: Quarterfinal
- Top goalscorer: League: Seol Ki-Hyeon (7); All: Mota (12)
- Highest home attendance: 15,329 vs Incheon (22 August)
- Lowest home attendance: 2,800 vs Chungju (21 April)
- Average home league attendance: 9,964
Home colours	Away colours

The 2010 season is Pohang Steelers' 28th season in the K-League in South Korea. Pohang Steelers competed in K-League, League Cup, Korean FA Cup, AFC Champions League.

== Squad ==
Note: Flags indicate national team as defined under FIFA eligibility rules; some limited exceptions apply. Players may hold more than one non-FIFA nationality.

No.	Pos.	Nation	Player
1	GK	KOR	Shin Hwa-Yong
2	MF	KOR	Park Hee-Chul
3	DF	KOR	Kim Gwang-Seok
4	DF	JPN	Kazunari Okayama
5	MF	KOR	Kim Tae-Su
6	MF	KOR	Kim Gi-Dong
7	MF	KOR	Kim Jae-Sung
8	MF	KOR	Hwang Jin-Sung
9	FW	BRA	Zulu
10	FW	BRA	Mota
11	FW	KOR	Seol Ki-Hyeon
12	GK	KOR	Hwang Kyo-Chung
13	MF	KOR	Cho Han-Bum
14	MF	KOR	Kim Ba-Woo
15	DF	KOR	Cho Hong-Kyu
16	MF	KOR	Kim Jung-Kyum
17	DF	KOR	Shin Kwang-Hoon
18	FW	KOR	Lee Jin-Ho (On loan from Ulsan)
19	DF	KOR	Ahn Tae-Eun
20	MF	KOR	Shin Hyung-Min
21	GK	KOR	Song Dong-Jin
22	DF	KOR	Jung Hong-Youn

No.	Pos.	Nation	Player
23	FW	KOR	Yoo Chang-Hyun
24	DF	KOR	Lee Won-Jae
25	MF	KOR	Jeong Seok-Min
26	FW	KOR	Cho Chan-Ho
27	MF	KOR	Kim Chang-Hoon
28	MF	KOR	Song Chang-Ho
29	FW	KOR	Choi Hyun-Youn
30	FW	KOR	Jung Jeong-Seok
31	GK	KOR	Kim Da-Sol
32	DF	KOR	Kim Hyung-Il (captain)
33	FW	KOR	Lee Ki-Dong
34	MF	KOR	Kim Beom-Jun
35	DF	KOR	Hwang Jae-Hun
36	DF	KOR	Kim Won-Il
37	DF	KOR	Kang Dae-Ho
38	DF	KOR	Han Ma-Ro
39	MF	KOR	Lee Sang-Hoon
40	MF	KOR	Kim Dae-Ho
41	GK	KOR	Kim Dae-Ho
42	FW	KOR	Lee Sung-Jae
77	FW	BRA	Almir

=== On loan ===
Note: Flags indicate national team as defined under FIFA eligibility rules; some limited exceptions apply. Players may hold more than one non-FIFA nationality.

No.	Pos.	Nation	Player
—	FW	KOR	Ko Gi-Gu (on loan to Daejeon Citizen)
—	FW	KOR	No Byung-Jun (on loan to Ulsan Hyundai)

== K-League ==
Date	Opponents	H / A	Result F – A	Scorers	Attendance	League position
6 March	Daegu FC	H	2 – 1	No Byung-Jun 63', Almir 81'	11,737	8th
14 March	Gwangju Sangmu FC	A	1 – 1	Alexsandro 67'	21,360	8th
20 March	Gangwon FC	H	4 – 0	Mota 11', 81', 88', Hwang Jin-Sung 56'	8,113	4th
27 March	FC Seoul	A	0 – 1		22,963	7th
3 April	Gyeongnam FC	A	1 – 3	Almir 78'	12,458	7th
10 April	Jeonbuk Hyundai Motors	H	3 – 3	Kim Jae-Sung 25', Kim Jung-Kyum 28', Hwang Jin-Sung 41'	10,780	9th
18 April	Incheon United	A	0 – 4		13,721	10th
24 April	Daejeon Citizen	H	0 – 1		8,792	10th
2 May	Seongnam Ilhwa Chunma	A	0 – 3		7,681	13th
5 May	Ulsan Hyundai Horang-i	H	1 – 1	Lee Ki-Dong 27'	13,827	11th
8 May	Jeju United FC	H	2 – 5	Ko Ki-Gu 45', Jeong Seok-Min 85'	7,453	12th
10 July	Chunnam Dragons	H	1 – 1	Kim Hyung-Il 56'	12,773	11th
17 July	Busan I'Park	A	2 – 4	Mota 37', Yoo Chang-Hyun 68'	5,830	12th
25 July	Suwon Samsung Bluewings	H	1 – 1	Seol Ki-Hyeon 5'	12,624	12th
31 July	Chunnam Dragons	A	2 – 2	Seol Ki-Hyeon 59', Yoo Chang-Hyun 63'	13,554	13th
8 August	Seongnam Ilhwa Chunma	H	2 – 0	Seol Ki-Hyeon 6', Almir 52'	13,213	10th
15 August	Daegu FC	A	2 – 0	Lee Jin-Ho 89', Own goal 90+3'	2,552	10th
22 August	Incheon United	H	3 – 2	Almir 9', Seol Ki-Hyeon 40', Hwang Jin-Sung 53'	15,329	9th
29 August	Ulsan Hyundai Horang-i	A	1 – 1	Kim Hyung-Il 90+4'	12,497	9th
1 September	FC Seoul	H	1 – 4	Seol Ki-Hyeon 90+2'	13,223	9th
4 September	Jeonbuk Hyundai Motors	A	2 – 3	Jung Hong-Youn 49', Lee Jin-Ho 82'	10,388	9th
26 September	Jeju United FC	A	1 – 1	Mota 8'	14,754	10th
9 October	Gwangju Sangmu FC	H	1 – 0	Lee Jin-Ho 71'	8,115	10th
16 October	Busan I'Park	H	2 – 2	Seol Ki-Hyeon 77'(pen), Lee Jin-Ho 90+1'	6,155	10th
27 October	Daejeon Citizen	A	1 – 0	Hwang Jin-Sung 60'	2,138	10th
31 October	Suwon Samsung Bluewings	A	0 – 2		26,256	10th
3 November	Gyeongnam FC	H	3 – 0	Own goal 11', Mota 34', Seol Ki-Hyeon 61'	14,286	9th
7 November	Gangwon FC	A	0 – 2		18,716	9th

Pos	Team	Pld	W	D	L	GF	GA	GD	Pts	Qualification
7	Suwon Samsung Bluewings	28	12	5	11	39	44	−5	41	Qualification for the Champions League (Note: Qualified as champions of the FA Cup.)
8	Busan IPark	28	8	9	11	36	37	−1	33	
9	Pohang Steelers	28	8	9	11	39	48	−9	33	
10	Jeonnam Dragons	28	8	8	12	40	49	−9	32	
11	Incheon United	28	8	7	13	42	51	−9	31	

Source: K League (in Korean)
Rules for classification: 1) Points; 2) Goal difference; 3) Goals scored
Notes:

Pos	Team	Qualification
1	FC Seoul (C)	Qualification for the Champions League
2	Jeju United	Qualification for the Champions League
3	Jeonbuk Hyundai Motors	Qualification for the Champions League
4	Seongnam Ilhwa Chunma	
5	Ulsan Hyundai	
6	Gyeongnam FC	

Source: RSSSF
(C) Champions

== Korean FA Cup ==
Date	Round	Opponents	H / A	Result F – A	Scorers	Attendance
21 April	Round of 32	Chungju Hummel FC	H	5 – 1	Mota 22', Alexsandro 32', 82', Choi Hyun-Youn 40', Jeong Seok-Min 59'	2,800
21 July	Round of 16	Gwangju Sangmu FC	A	1 – 2	Kim Gi-Dong 21'	200

== League Cup ==
=== Group stage ===
Date	Opponents	H / A	Result F – A	Scorers	Attendance	Group position
23 May	Daegu FC	A	2 – 1	Mota 29', Hwang Jin-Sung 54'	1,215	2nd
26 May	Daejeon Citizen	H	1 – 1	Mota 41'	5,562	1st
2 June	Busan I'Park	H	1 – 2	Mota 6'(pen)	7,213	2nd
6 June	Incheon United	A	1 – 1	Cho Chan-Ho 58'	5,472	3rd

Pos	Team	Pld	W	D	L	GF	GA	GD	Pts	BIP	DGU	PHS	ICU	DJC
1	Busan IPark	4	3	0	1	9	5	+4	9	—	2–3	—	1–0	—
2	Daegu FC	4	2	0	2	9	9	0	6	—	—	1–2	—	3–2
3	Pohang Steelers	4	1	2	1	5	5	0	5	1–2	—	—	—	1–1
4	Incheon United	4	1	1	2	6	7	−1	4	—	3–2	1–1	—	—
5	Daejeon Citizen	4	1	1	2	7	10	−3	4	1–4	—	—	3–2	—

Source: RSSSF

== AFC Champions League ==
=== Group stage ===
Date	Opponents	H / A	Result F – A	Scorers	Attendance	Group position
24 February 2010	(Australia) Adelaide United	A	0 – 1		8,374	3rd
10 March 2010	(Japan) Sanfrecce Hiroshima	H	2 – 1	Hwang Jae-Won 54', Almir 90+2'	10,293	2nd
24 March 2010	(China) Shandong Luneng	H	1 – 0	No Byung-Jun 5'	10,128	2nd
30 March 2010	(China) Shandong Luneng	A	2 – 1	Kim Jae-Sung 51', Kim Tae-Su 86'	11,810	2nd
13 April 2010	(Australia) Adelaide United	H	0 – 0		8,217	2nd
27 April 2010	(Japan) Sanfrecce Hiroshima	A	3 – 4	Kim Jae-Sung 4', 48', Shin Hyung-Min 63'	5,612	2nd

Pos	Team	Pld	W	D	L	GF	GA	GD	Pts	Qualification
1	(Australia) Adelaide United	6	3	1	2	6	4	+2	10	Advance to knockout stage
2	(South Korea) Pohang Steelers	6	3	1	2	8	7	+1	10	Advance to knockout stage
3	(Japan) Sanfrecce Hiroshima	6	3	0	3	11	11	0	9	
4	(China) Shandong Luneng	6	2	0	4	5	8	−3	6	

Source: AFC Champions League Official Page

=== Knockout stage ===
Date	Round	Opponents	H / A	Result F – A	Scorers	Attendance
12 May 2010	Round of 16	(Japan) Kashima Antlers	A	1 – 0	Mota 29'	9,794
15 September 2010	Quarterfinal 1st leg	(Iran) Zob Ahan Isfahan	A	1 – 2	Mota 56'	9,156
21 September 2010	Quarterfinal 2nd leg	(Iran) Zob Ahan Isfahan	H	1 – 1	Kim Jae-Sung 10'	8,617

== Statistics ==
=== Appearances and goals ===
Statistics accurate as of match played 7 November 2010

No.	Pos.	Name	League		FA Cup		League Cup		Asia		Total		
No.	Pos.	Name	Apps	Goals	Apps	Goals	Apps	Goals	Apps	Goals	Apps	Total	Goals
1	GK	(South Korea) Shin Hwa-Yong	23	0	2	0	4	0	9	0	38 (0)	38	0
2	MF	(South Korea) Park Hee-Chul	8 (2)	0	2	0	1	0	2	0	13 (2)	15	0
3	DF	(South Korea) Kim Gwang-Seok	9 (3)	0	0	0	4	0	7	0	20 (3)	23	0
4	DF	(Japan) Kazunari Okayama	4 (2)	0	0	0	2	0	3	0	9 (2)	11	0
5	MF	(South Korea) Kim Tae-Su	18 (2)	0	1	0	2	0	7	1	28 (2)	30	1
6	MF	(South Korea) Kim Gi-Dong	3 (6)	0	1	1	3 (1)	0	0	0	7 (7)	14	1
7	MF	(South Korea) Kim Jae-Sung	23 (1)	1	0 (1)	0	0	0	9	4	32 (2)	34	5
8	MF	(South Korea) Hwang Jin-Sung	20 (1)	4	1	0	3	1	2 (5)	0	26 (6)	32	5
9	FW	(Brazil) Zulu	0 (1)	0	0	0	0	0	0	0	0 (1)	1	0
10	FW	(Brazil) Mota	24	6	2	1	3 (1)	3	9	2	38 (1)	39	12
11	FW	(South Korea) Seol Ki-Hyeon	16	7	0	0	0	0	2	0	18 (0)	18	7
12	GK	(South Korea) Hwang Kyo-Chung	4	0	0	0	0	0	0	0	4 (0)	4	0
13	MF	(South Korea) Cho Han-Bum	0	0	0	0	0	0	0	0	0	0	0
14	FW	(South Korea) Kim Ba-Woo	0	0	0 (1)	0	0 (1)	0	0	0	0 (2)	2	0
15	DF	(South Korea) Cho Hong-Kyu	3	0	1	0	0 (1)	0	0 (1)	0	4 (2)	6	0
16	MF	(South Korea) Kim Jung-Kyum	13 (1)	1	1	0	2	0	5	0	21 (1)	22	1
17	DF	(South Korea) Shin Kwang-Hoon	8	0	0	0	0	0	1	0	9 (0)	9	0
18	FW	(South Korea) Lee Jin-Ho	5 (6)	4	0 (1)	0	0	0	1	0	6 (7)	13	4
19	DF	(South Korea) Ahn Tae-Eun	3 (1)	0	0	0	4	0	1	0	8 (1)	9	0
20	MF	(South Korea) Shin Hyung-Min	22	0	1	0	0	0	9	1	32 (0)	32	1
21	GK	(South Korea) Song Dong-Jin	1	0	0	0	0	0	0	0	1 (0)	1	0
22	DF	(South Korea) Jung Hong-Youn	11	1	0	0	0	0	2	0	13 (0)	13	1
23	FW	(South Korea) Yoo Chang-Hyun	2 (7)	2	1	0	3 (1)	0	0 (4)	0	6 (12)	18	2
24	DF	(South Korea) Lee Won-Jae	3	0	0	0	0	0	0	0	3 (0)	3	0
25	MF	(South Korea) Jeong Seok-Min	1 (2)	1	1	1	2	0	0 (1)	0	4 (3)	7	2
26	FW	(South Korea) Cho Chan-Ho	4 (7)	0	1 (1)	0	2 (2)	1	1	0	8 (10)	18	1
27	MF	(South Korea) Kim Chang-Hoon	0 (1)	0	0	0	0	0	0	0	0 (1)	1	0
28	MF	(South Korea) Song Chang-Ho	4 (5)	0	0 (1)	0	1 (1)	0	0 (4)	0	5 (11)	16	0
29	FW	(South Korea) Choi Hyun-Youn	2 (2)	0	1	1	0 (1)	0	0 (2)	0	3 (5)	8	1
30	FW	(South Korea) Jung Jeong-Seok	1	0	0	0	0	0	0	0	1 (0)	1	0
31	GK	(South Korea) Kim Da-Sol	0 (1)	0	0	0	0	0	0	0	0 (1)	1	0
32	DF	(South Korea) Kim Hyung-Il	22	2	1	0	0	0	8	0	31 (0)	31	2
33	FW	(South Korea) Lee Ki-Dong	2	1	0	0	0 (1)	0	0	0	2 (1)	3	1
34	MF	(South Korea) Kim Bum-Joon	0	0	0	0	0	0	0	0	0	0	0
35	DF	(South Korea) Hwang Jae-Hun	1	0	0	0	0	0	0	0	1 (0)	1	0
36	MF	(South Korea) Kim Won-Il	12 (1)	0	1	0	0	0	2	0	15 (1)	16	0
37	DF	(South Korea) Kang Dae-Ho	3 (1)	0	1	0	1	0	0	0	5 (1)	6	0
38	DF	(South Korea) Han Ma-Ro	0	0	0	0	0	0	0	0	0	0	0
39	MF	(South Korea) Lee Sang-Hoon	0	0	0	0	0	0	0	0	0	0	0
40	MF	(South Korea) Kim Dae-Ho	1 (3)	0	0 (1)	0	0	0	0	0	1 (4)	5	0
41	GK	(South Korea) Kim Dae-Ho	0	0	0	0	0	0	0	0	0	0	0
42	FW	(South Korea) Lee Sung-Jae	2 (3)	0	0	0	0	0	0	0	2 (3)	5	0
77	FW	(Brazil) Almir	13 (9)	4	1 (1)	0	3	0	3 (6)	1	20 (16)	36	5
88	DF	(South Korea) Jang Hyun-Kyu	1	0	0	0	0	0	0	0	1 (0)	1	0
9	FW	(Brazil) Alexsandro (out)	5 (4)	1	1	2	0	0	5 (1)	0	11 (5)	16	3
17	MF	(South Korea) Ko Gi-Gu (loan out)	2 (4)	1	0	0	0	0	0 (3)	0	2 (7)	9	1
22	FW	(South Korea) No Byung-Jun (loan out)	3	1	0	0	2 (1)	0	5	1	10 (1)	11	2
24	DF	(South Korea) Hwang Jae-Won (out)	6	0	1	0	3	0	5	1	15 (0)	15	1

=== Top scorers ===
Position	Nation	Number	Name	K-League	KFA Cup	League Cup	Champions League	Total
1	(Brazil)	10	Mota	6	1	3	2	12
2	(South Korea)	11	Seol Ki-Hyeon	7	0	0	0	7
3	(Brazil)	77	Almir	4	0	0	1	5
=	(South Korea)	8	Hwang Jin-Sung	4	0	1	0	5
=	(South Korea)	7	Kim Jae-Sung	1	0	0	4	5
4	(South Korea)	18	Lee Jin-Ho	4	0	0	0	4
5	(Brazil)	9	Alexsandro	1	2	0	0	3
6	(South Korea)	23	Yoo Chang-Hyun	2	0	0	0	2
=	(South Korea)	32	Kim Hyung-Il	2	0	0	0	2
=	(South Korea)	25	Jeong Seok-Min	1	1	0	0	2
=	(South Korea)	22	Noh Byung-Joon	1	0	0	1	2
7	(South Korea)	16	Kim Jung-Kyum	1	0	0	0	1
=	(South Korea)	17	Ko Ki-Gu	1	0	0	0	1
=	(South Korea)	22	Jung Hong-Youn	1	0	0	0	1
=	(South Korea)	33	Lee Ki-Dong	1	0	0	0	1
=	(South Korea)	6	Kim Gi-Dong	0	1	0	0	1
=	(South Korea)	29	Choi Hyun-Youn	0	1	0	0	1
=	(South Korea)	5	Kim Tae-Su	0	0	0	1	1
=	(South Korea)	20	Shin Hyung-Min	0	0	0	1	1
=	(South Korea)	24	Hwang Jae-Won	0	0	0	1	1
=	(South Korea)	26	Cho Chan-Ho	0	0	1	0	1
/	/	/	Own Goals	2	0	0	0	2
			TOTALS	39	6	5	11	61

=== Discipline ===
Position	Nation	Number	Name	K-League		KFA Cup		League Cup		Champions League		Total	
Position	Nation	Number	Name	Booked	Sent off (straight red)	Booked	Sent off (straight red)	Booked	Sent off (straight red)	Booked	Sent off (straight red)	Booked	Sent off (straight red)
GK	(South Korea)	1	Shin Hwa-Yong	2	0	0	0	0	0	0	0	2	0
MF	(South Korea)	2	Park Hee-Chul	5	1	0	0	0	0	1	0	6	1
DF	(South Korea)	3	Kim Gwang-Seok	1	0	0	0	0	0	1	0	2	0
DF	(Japan)	4	Kazunari Okayama	1	0	0	0	0	0	0	0	1	0
MF	(South Korea)	5	Kim Tae-Su	3	0	0	0	0	0	3	1	8	1
MF	(South Korea)	6	Kim Gi-Dong	2	0	0	0	0	0	0	0	2	0
MF	(South Korea)	7	Kim Jae-Sung	5	0	0	0	0	0	0	0	5	0
MF	(South Korea)	8	Hwang Jin-Sung	1	0	0	0	1	0	1	0	3	0
FW	(Brazil)	9	Alexsandro	2	0	0	0	0	0	0	0	2	0
FW	(Brazil)	10	Mota	6	1	1	0	1	0	1	0	9	1
FW	(South Korea)	14	Kim Ba-Woo	0	0	0	0	1	0	0	0	1	0
DF	(South Korea)	15	Cho Hong-Kyu	1	0	0	0	0	0	0	0	1	0
MF	(South Korea)	16	Kim Jung-Kyum	3	0	0	0	0	0	2	0	5	0
FW	(South Korea)	17	Ko Ki-Gu	1	0	0	0	0	0	0	0	1	0
DF	(South Korea)	17	Shin Kwang-Hoon	3	0	0	0	0	0	0	0	3	0
FW	(South Korea)	18	Lee Jin-Ho	4	0	0	0	0	0	0	0	4	0
DF	(South Korea)	19	Ahn Tae-Eun	1	0	0	0	2	0	0	0	3	0
MF	(South Korea)	20	Shin Hyung-Min	11	0	0	0	0	0	1	0	12	0
FW	(South Korea)	22	No Byung-Jun	0	0	0	0	1	0	0	0	1	0
MF	(South Korea)	22	Jung Hong-Youn	3	0	0	0	0	0	1	0	4	0
DF	(South Korea)	24	Hwang Jae-Won	5	1	1	0	0	0	2	0	8	1
DF	(South Korea)	24	Lee Won-Jae	1	0	0	0	0	0	0	0	1	0
MF	(South Korea)	25	Jeong Seok-Min	0	0	0	0	1	0	1	0	2	0
MF	(South Korea)	28	Song Chang-Ho	0	0	0	0	0	0	1	0	1	0
FW	(South Korea)	29	Choi Hyun-Youn	0	0	1	0	0	0	0	0	1	0
GK	(South Korea)	31	Kim Da-Sol	1	0	0	0	0	0	0	0	1	0
DF	(South Korea)	32	Kim Hyung-Il	8	2	0	0	0	0	0	0	8	2
FW	(South Korea)	33	Lee Ki-Dong	2	0	0	0	0	0	0	0	2	0
DF	(South Korea)	36	Kim Won-Il	1	0	0	0	0	0	1	0	2	0
DF	(South Korea)	37	Kang Dae-Ho	1	0	0	0	1	0	0	0	2	0
MF	(South Korea)	40	Kim Dae-Ho	2	0	0	0	0	0	0	0	2	0
FW	(Brazil)	77	Almir	1	0	0	0	0	0	0	0	1	0
DF	(South Korea)	88	Jang Hyun-Kyu	1	0	0	0	0	0	0	0	1	0
/	/	/	TOTALS	78	5	3	0	8	0	16	1	105	6

== Transfers ==
=== In ===
Date	Pos.	Name	From	Source
17 November 2009	GK	(South Korea) Hwang Kyo-Chung	(South Korea) Gimhae FC	Draft (in Korean)
17 November 2009	GK	(South Korea) Kim Da-Sol	(South Korea) Yonsei University	Draft (in Korean)
17 November 2009	MF	(South Korea) Jeong Seok-Min	(South Korea) Inje University	Draft (in Korean)
17 November 2009	DF	(South Korea) Kim Won-Il	(South Korea) Soongsil University	Draft (in Korean)
17 November 2009	FW	(South Korea) Lee Ki-Dong	(South Korea) Cheongju Jikji FC	Draft (in Korean)
17 November 2009	MF	(South Korea) Lee Sang-Hoon	(South Korea) Youngdong University	Draft (in Korean)
17 November 2009	DF	(South Korea) Han Ma-Ro	(South Korea) Myongji University	Draft (in Korean)
28 December 2010	FW	(Brazil) Mota	(Brazil) Ceará SC	Transfer (in Portuguese)
11 January 2010	DF	(South Korea) Ahn Tae-Eun	(South Korea) FC Seoul	Transfer (in Korean)
11 January 2010	MF	(South Korea) Kim Dae-Ho	(South Korea) Soongsil University	Youth team (in Korean)
11 January 2010	FW	(South Korea) Jung Jeong-Seok	(South Korea) Konkuk University	Youth team (in Korean)
15 January 2010	FW	(South Korea) Ko Ki-Gu	(South Korea) Chunnam Dragons	Transfer (in Korean)
15 January 2010	FW	(South Korea) Choi Hyun-Youn	(South Korea) Jeju United	Free Agent (in Korean)
17 January 2010	FW	(South Korea) Seol Ki-Hyeon	(England) Fulham	Transfer (in Korean)
27 January 2010	FW	(Brazil) Almir	(South Korea) Ulsan Hyundai Horang-i	Transfer (in Korean)
2 February 2010	FW	(Brazil) Alexandro	(Brazil) América	Transfer (in Korean)
March 2010	FW	(South Korea) Lee Sung-Jae	(South Korea) Incheon United	Transfer
23 July 2010	FW	(Brazil) Zulu	(Brazil) ABC	Transfer (in Korean)
23 July 2010	DF	(South Korea) Jung Hong-Youn	(South Korea) Busan I'Park FC	Transfer (in Korean)
29 July 2010	DF	(South Korea) Shin Kwang-Hoon	(South Korea) Jeonbuk Hyundai Motors	Loan end
29 July 2010	DF	(South Korea) Lee Won-Jae	(South Korea) Ulsan Hyundai FC	Transfer

Loan In

Date	Pos.	Name	From	End	Source
22 June 2010	FW	(South Korea) Lee Jin-Ho	(South Korea) Ulsan Hyundai FC	December 2010	Loan in (in Korean)

=== Out ===
Date	Pos.	Name	To	Source
December 2009	MF	(Brazil) Vaguinho	Contract end	
5 January 2010	FW	(South Korea) Namgung Do	(South Korea) Seongnam Ilhwa Chunma	Transfer (in Korean)
6 January 2010	DF	(South Korea) Song Je-Heon	(South Korea) Daegu FC	Free Agent (in Korean)
7 January 2010	MF	(South Korea) Go Seul-Ki	(South Korea) Ulsan Hyundai Horang-i	Free Agent (in Korean)
9 January 2010	FW	(Brazil) Denilson	(Uzbekistan) FC Bunyodkor	Transfer (in English), Transfer (in English)
9 January 2010	FW	(North Macedonia) Stevica Ristić	(Uzbekistan) FC Bunyodkor	Transfer (in English)
11 January 2010	MF	(South Korea) Choi Hyo-Jin	(South Korea) FC Seoul	Free Agent (in Korean)
12 January 2010	FW	(South Korea) Kim Myung-Joong	(South Korea) Chunnam Dragons	Free Agent (in Korean)
January 2010	MF	(South Korea) Cho Moon-Sang	unattached	Free Agent
January 2010	MF	(South Korea) Song Soon-Bo	unattached	Free Agent
January 2010	MF	(South Korea) Maeng Jin-Oh	unattached	Free Agent
January 2010	MF	(South Korea) Jung Hyung-Ho	unattached	Free Agent
July 2010	FW	(Brazil) Alexsandro	unattached	Cancel a contract
26 July 2010	DF	(South Korea) Hwang Jae-Won	(South Korea) Suwon Samsung Bluewings	Transfer

Loan Out

Date	Pos.	Name	To	End	Source
22 June 2010	FW	(South Korea) No Byung-Jun	(South Korea) Ulsan Hyundai FC	December 2010	Loan Out (in Korean)
12 July 2010	FW	(South Korea) Ko Ki-Gu	(South Korea) Daejeon Citizen	December 2010	Loan Out (in Korean)
