= 2012 Pohang Steelers season =

Pohang Steelers
2012 season
- Chairman: Kim Tae-Man
- Manager: Hwang Sun-Hong
- K-League: 7th
- Korean FA Cup: Round of 16
- Champions League: Group round
- Top goalscorer: League: Ianis Zicu (6); All: Derek Asamoah (7)
- Highest home attendance: 13,612 vs Ulsan (March 3)
- Lowest home attendance: 2,833 vs Adelaide Utd (April 3)
- Average home league attendance: 7,068 (as of May 11)
Home colours	Away colours

The 2012 season was Pohang Steelers' thirtieth season in the K-League in South Korea. Pohang Steelers is competing K-League, Korean FA Cup and AFC Champions League.

== Current squad ==
Note: Flags indicate national team as defined under FIFA eligibility rules; some limited exceptions apply. Players may hold more than one non-FIFA nationality.

No.	Pos.	Nation	Player
1	GK	KOR	Shin Hwa-Yong
2	MF	KOR	Park Hee-Chul
3	DF	KOR	Kim Gwang-Seok
4	DF	KOR	Bae Seul-Ki
5	DF	KOR	Lee Won-Jae
6	MF	KOR	Shin Jin-Ho
7	DF	SRB	Zoran Rendulić
8	MF	KOR	Hwang Jin-Sung
9	MF	KOR	Hwang Ji-Soo
10	FW	GHA	Derek Asamoah
11	FW	KOR	Park Sung-Ho
12	GK	KOR	Hwang Kyo-Chung
13	DF	KOR	Kim Won-Il
14	MF	KOR	Kim Tae-Su
15	DF	KOR	Jung Hong-Youn
16	FW	KOR	Kim Jin-Yong (on loan from Gangwon)
17	DF	KOR	Shin Kwang-Hoon
18	FW	KOR	Ko Mu-Yeol

No.	Pos.	Nation	Player
19	FW	KOR	Kim Sun-Woo
20	MF	KOR	Shin Hyung-Min (captain)
21	GK	KOR	Song Dong-Jin
22	FW	KOR	No Byung-Jun
23	DF	KOR	Yoon Joon-Sung
24	MF	KOR	Kim Dae-Ho
26	FW	KOR	Cho Chan-Ho
27	FW	ROU	Ianis Zicu
28	DF	KOR	An Il-Joo
29	MF	KOR	Lee Myung-Joo
30	FW	KOR	Kim Chan-Hee
31	GK	KOR	Kim Da-Sol
32	FW	KOR	Kim Eun-Chong
33	FW	KOR	Lee Kwang-Hoon
34	MF	KOR	Yoon Won-Il
35	MF	KOR	Hwang Jung-Soo
36	MF	KOR	Moon Chang-Jin
77	MF	KOR	Moon Kyu-Hyun

=== Out on loan ===
Note: Flags indicate national team as defined under FIFA eligibility rules; some limited exceptions apply. Players may hold more than one non-FIFA nationality.

No.	Pos.	Nation	Player
—	MF	KOR	Kim Beom-Joon (at Sangju Sangmu Phoenix)
—	FW	KOR	Lee Sung-Jae (at Sangju Sangmu Phoenix)
—	FW	KOR	Yoo Chang-Hyun (at Sangju Sangmu Phoenix)
—	DF	KOR	Kim Hyung-Il (at Sangju Sangmu Phoenix)

No.	Pos.	Nation	Player
—	MF	KOR	Kim Jae-Sung (at Sangju Sangmu Phoenix)
—	FW	KOR	Jeong Jung-Seok (at Sangju Sangmu Phoenix)
—	MF	KOR	Kim Jung-Bin (at Sangju Sangmu Phoenix)

== Transfer ==
=== In ===
Note: Flags indicate national team as defined under FIFA eligibility rules; some limited exceptions apply. Players may hold more than one non-FIFA nationality.

No.	Pos.	Nation	Player
—	FW	KOR	Park Sung-Ho (Transferred from Daejeon Citizen)
—	FW	KOR	Hwang Ji-Soo (Loan return from Yangju Citizen FC)
—	FW	KOR	Kim Chan-Hee (Drafted from Hanyang University)
—	DF	KOR	Yoon Joon-Sung (Drafted from Kyunghee University)
—	DF	KOR	Bae Seul-Ki (Drafted)
—	FW	KOR	Kim Eun-Chong (Drafted from Yonsei University)
—	MF	KOR	Lee Myoung-Joo (Drafted from Youngnam University)

No.	Pos.	Nation	Player
—	MF	KOR	Moon Kyu-Hyun (Drafted from youth team)
—	MF	KOR	Moon Chang-Jin (Drafted from youth team)
—	FW	KOR	Lee Kwang-Hoon (Drafted from youth team)
—	FW	ROU	Ianis Zicu (Transferred from CSKA Sofia)
—	DF	SRB	Zoran Rendulić (Transferred from FK Javor Ivanjica)
—	FW	KOR	Kim Jin-Yong (Loan from Gangwon FC)

=== Out ===
Note: Flags indicate national team as defined under FIFA eligibility rules; some limited exceptions apply. Players may hold more than one non-FIFA nationality.

No.	Pos.	Nation	Player
—	FW	KOR	Kim Dong-Hee (Transferred to Daejeon Citizen)
—	MF	KOR	Lee Seul-Gi (Transferred to Daejeon Citizen)
—	DF	KOR	Kim Hyung-Il (Loaned to Sangju Sangmu Phoenix for military service)
—	MF	KOR	Kim Jae-Sung (Loaned to Sangju Sangmu Phoenix for military service)
—	FW	KOR	Jeong Jung-Seok (Loaned to Sangju Sangmu Phoenix for military service)

No.	Pos.	Nation	Player
—	MF	KOR	Kim Jung-Bin (Loaned to Sangju Sangmu Phoenix for military service)
—	FW	BRA	Mota (Released)
—	FW	BRA	Adriano Chuva (Released)
—	DF	KOR	Kang Dae-Ho (Transferred to Daejeon Citizen)

== Coaching staff ==
Position	Staff
Manager	(South Korea) Hwang Sun-Hong
Assistant Manager	(South Korea) Kang Chul
Coach	(South Korea) Yoon Hee-Jun
GK Coach	(South Korea) Kim Il-Jin
Physical Coach	(Brazil) Flavio

Last updated: 19 February 2012
Source: Pohang Steelers

== Match results ==
=== K-League ===
All times are Korea Standard Time (KST) – UTC+9

Date Round	Home	Score	Away	Location

3 March 1	Pohang	0–1	Ulsan	Pohang, Gyeongbuk
15:00		Report	Kim Shin-Wook 44'	Stadium: Pohang Steel Yard; Attendance: 13,612; Referee: Song Min-Seok

11 March 2	Gwangju	1–1	Pohang	Seo-gu, Gwangju
15:00	Kim Eun-sun (0:30)	Report	Zicu 34' (Assist by No.14)	Stadium: Gwangju World Cup Stadium; Attendance: 8,551; Referee: Hong Jin-Ho

17 March 3	Pohang	2–2	Busan	Pohang, Gyeongbuk
17:00	Zicu 9', 37'	Report	Kim Han-Yoon 41'; Lee Jong-Won 69'	Stadium: Pohang Steel Yard; Attendance: 9,134; Referee: Ko Keum-Bok

25 March 4	Sangju	1–2	Pohang	Sangju, Gyeongbuk
15:00	Yoo Chang-Hyun 45'; Kim Hyung-Il (yellow card) 87' (yellow-red card) 90+2'	Report	Cho Chan-Ho 60' (Assist by No.20); Zicu 90+3' (Assist by No.18)	Stadium: Sangju Civic Stadium; Attendance: 2,043; Referee: Moon Jin-Hee

30 March 5	Pohang	1–0	Chunnam	Pohang, Gyeongbuk
19:30	Cho Chan-Ho 29' (Assist by No.17)	Report		Stadium: Pohang Steel Yard; Attendance: 6,128; Referee: Lee Jong-Guk

8 April 6	Seongnam	0–2	Pohang	Seongnam, Gyeonggi
15:00		Report	Asamoah 49' (Assist by No.29); Zicu 80' (Assist by No.18)	Stadium: Tancheon Sports Complex; Attendance: 3,697; Referee: Choi Myung-Yong

11 April 7	Suwon	2–0	Pohang	Suwon, Gyeonggi
13:00	Radončić 15'; Lee Yong-Rae 82'	Report		Stadium: Suwon World Cup Stadium; Attendance: 10,434; Referee: Ahn Yong-Hee

14 April 8	Pohang	2–3	Jeju	Pohang, Gyeongbuk
15:00	Asamoah 27' (Assist by No.2); Zicu 57' (Assist by No.18)	Report	Santos 21', 45'; Jair 43'; Park Byeong-Ju (yellow card) 81' (yellow-red card) 90+1'	Stadium: Pohang Steel Yard; Attendance: 8,747; Referee: Ko Keum-Bok

22 April 9	Pohang	1–0	Jeonbuk	Pohang, Gyeongbuk
15:00	Hwang Jin-Sung 3' (Assist by No.26)	Report		Stadium: Pohang Steel Yard; Attendance: 11,053; Referee: Kim Wan-Tae

28 April 10	Daegu	1–0	Pohang	Suseong-gu, Daegu
15:00	Lee Jin-Ho 90'	Report		Stadium: Daegu Stadium; Attendance: 21,750; Referee: Kim Sung-Ho

5 May 11	Seoul	2–1	Pohang	Mapo-gu, Seoul
15:00	Choi Tae-Uk (0:28); Kim Tae-Hwan 72'	Report	Asamoah 52'	Stadium: Seoul World Cup Stadium; Attendance: 45,982; Referee: Lee Min-Hu

11 May 12	Pohang	0–0	Daejeon	Pohang, Gyeongbuk
19:30		Report		Stadium: Pohang Steel Yard; Attendance: 6,557; Referee: Woo Sang-Il

20 May 13	Gangwon	1–2	Pohang	Gangneung, Gangwon
15:00	Jung Sung-Min 80'	Report	Asamoah 7' (Assist by No.14); Ko Mu-Yeol 62' (Assist by No.10)	Stadium: Gangneung Stadium; Attendance: 3,293; Referee: Lee Dong-Jun

26 May 14	Pohang	0–1	Gyeongnam	Pohang, Gyeongbuk
15:00		Report	Yun Il-Rok 79'	Stadium: Pohang Steel Yard; Attendance: 7,759; Referee: An Yong-Hee

14 June 15	Incheon	1–1	Pohang	Nam-gu, Incheon
19:30	Jung In-Hwan 29'	Report	Kim Won-Il 90+3' (Assist by No.6)	Stadium: Incheon Football Stadium; Attendance: 82^{[1]} Referee: Kim Wan-Tae

17 June 16	Pohang	1–0	Seoul	Pohang, Gyeongbuk
17:00	Kim Dae-Ho 58' (Assist by No.8)	Report		Stadium: Pohang Steel Yard; Attendance: 11,887; Referee: Lee Min-Hu

23 June 17	Jeju	0–1	Pohang	Seogwipo, Jeju
19:00		Report	Lee Myung-Joo 84' (Assist by No.20); Shin Hwa-Yong (red card) 90+4'	Stadium: Jeju World Cup Stadium; Attendance: 6,227; Referee: Choi Myung-Yong

27 June 18	Ulsan	3–1	Pohang	Nam-gu, Ulsan
19:00	Maranhão 27'; Ienaga 48'; Choi Jae-Soo 67'	Report(English); Report(Korean)	No Byung-Jun 30' (Assist by No.29); Shin Kwang-Hoon (red card) 58'	Stadium: Ulsan Munsu Football Stadium; Attendance: 14,135; Referee: Ko Keum-Bok

[1] Round 15 Match of Incheon vs Pohang was originally K-League restricted non-attendance match.

==== League table ====
Pos	Team	Pld	W	D	L	GF	GA	GD	Pts	Qualification or relegation
1	FC Seoul (C)	44	29	9	6	76	42	+34	96	Qualification for the Champions League (Note: Pohang Steelers finished the league in third place after qualifying for the Champions League as winners of the FA Cup: therefore, the spot given to the third-placed team was passed to the Suwon Samsung Bluewings, the fourth-placed team.)
2	Jeonbuk Hyundai Motors	44	22	13	9	82	49	+33	79	Qualification for the Champions League
3	Pohang Steelers	44	23	8	13	72	47	+25	77	Qualification for the Champions League
4	Suwon Samsung Bluewings	44	20	13	11	61	51	+10	73	Qualification for the Champions League
5	Ulsan Hyundai	44	18	14	12	60	52	+8	68	

Source: K League
Rules for classification: 1) Points; 2) Goal difference; 3) Goals scored.
(C) Champions

==== Results summary ====
Overall								Home						Away					
Pld	W	D	L	GF	GA	GD	Pts	W	D	L	GF	GA	GD	W	D	L	GF	GA	GD
18	7	4	7	18	19	−1	25	3	2	3	7	7	0	4	2	4	11	12	−1

==== Results by round ====
Round	1	2	3	4	5	6	7	8	9	10	11	12	13	14	15	16	17	18	19	20	21	22	23	24	25	26	27	28	29	30	31	32	33	34	35	36	37	38	39	40	41	42	43	44
Ground	H	A	H	A	H	A	A	H	H	A	A	H	A	H	A	H	A	A	H	H	A	H	H	A	H	A	A	H	H	A														
Result	L	D	D	W	W	W	L	L	W	L	L	D	W	L	D	W	W	L																										
Position	12	10	11	8	7	5	7	7	6	8	8	9	7	9	9	7	7	8																										

Updated to match(es) played on 28 June 2012. Source: League Fixtures and Results
A = Away; H = Home; W = Win; D = Draw; L = Loss

=== Korean FA Cup ===
23 May Round of 32	Pohang Steelers	4–0	Cheongju Jikji	Pohang, Gyeongbuk
19:30 KST	Shin Hyung-Min 14' (pen.); Asamoah 51' (Assist by No.14); Ko Mu-Yeol 66' (Assist by No.11); Park Sung-Ho 76' (Assist by No.8)			Stadium: Pohang Steel Yard; Attendance: 1,452; Referee: Kim Cheol-Yong

20 June Round of 16	Pohang Steelers	3–1	Gwangju FC	Pohang, Gyeongbuk
19:30 KST	No Byung-Jun 22' (Assist by No.17); Ko Mu-Yeol 59' (Assist by No.22); No Byung-Jun 90+2' (Assist by No.6)		Park Jeong-Min 43'	Stadium: Pohang Steel Yard; Attendance: 2,875; Referee: Song Min-Seok

1 August Quarterfinal	–
TBD KST

=== AFC Champions League ===
==== Qualifying play-off ====
18 February Qualifying play-off	Pohang Steelers (South Korea)	2–0	(Thailand) Chonburi	Pohang, South Korea
15:30 UTC+9	Hwang Jin-Sung 28' (Free kick); Park Sung-Ho 70' (Assist by No.20)	Report		Stadium: Pohang Steel Yard; Attendance: 5,344; Referee: Peter Green (Australia)

==== Group stage (Group E) ====
Pos	Team	Pld	W	D	L	GF	GA	GD	Pts	Qualification	ADE	BYD	POH	GMB
1	(Australia) Adelaide United	6	4	1	1	7	2	+5	13	Advance to knockout stage	—	0–0	1–0	2–0
2	(Uzbekistan) Bunyodkor	6	3	1	2	8	7	+1	10	Advance to knockout stage	1–2	—	1–0	3–2
3	(South Korea) Pohang Steelers	6	3	0	3	6	4	+2	9		1–0	0–2	—	2–0
4	(Japan) Gamba Osaka	6	1	0	5	5	13	−8	3		0–2	3–1	0–3	—

Source: WorldFootball.net

6 March Match 1	Gamba Osaka (Japan)	0–3	(South Korea) Pohang Steelers	Osaka, Japan
19:00 UTC+9		Report	Kim Tae-Su 19' (Assist by No.17); Rendulić 22'; Asamoah 76' (Assist by No.20)	Stadium: Osaka Expo '70 Stadium; Attendance: 9,101; Referee: Abdulrahman Abdou (Qatar)

20 March Match 2	Pohang Steelers (South Korea)	0–2	(Uzbekistan) Bunyodkor	Pohang, South Korea
19:30 UTC+9		Report	Turaev 28'; Murzoev 77'	Stadium: Pohang Steel Yard; Attendance: 3,449; Referee: Ali Al Badwawi (UAE)

3 April Match 3	Pohang Steelers (South Korea)	1–0	(Australia) Adelaide United	Pohang, South Korea
20:00 UTC+9	Kim Dae-Ho 68'	Report		Stadium: Pohang Steel Yard; Attendance: 2,833; Referee: Khalil Al Ghamdi (Saudi Arabia)

18 April Match 4	Adelaide United (Australia)	1–0	(South Korea) Pohang Steelers	Adelaide, Australia
19:30 UTC+9:30	Djite 90'	Report		Stadium: Hindmarsh Stadium; Attendance: 7,659; Referee: Tan Hai (China P.R.)

2 May Match 5	Pohang Steelers (South Korea)	2–0	(Japan) Gamba Osaka	Pohang, South Korea
19:30 UTC+9	Kim Jin-Yong 45+1'; Asamoah 77'	Report		Stadium: Pohang Steel Yard; Attendance: 3,825; Referee: Alireza Faghani (Iran)

16 May Match 6	Bunyodkor (Uzbekistan)	1–0	(South Korea) Pohang Steelers	Tashkent, Uzbekistan
19:30 UTC+9:30	Gafurov 48'	Report		Stadium: JAR Stadium; Attendance: 5,100; Referee: Abdullah Balideh (Qatar)

== Squad statistics ==
=== Appearances ===
Statistics accurate as of match played 27 June 2012

No.	Nat.	Pos.	Name	League		FA Cup		Champions League		Appearances		Goals
No.	Nat.	Pos.	Name	Apps	Goals	Apps	Goals	Apps	Goals	App (sub)	Total	Goals
1	(South Korea)	GK	Shin Hwa-Yong	7	0	0	0	6	0	13 (0)	13	0
2	(South Korea)	MF	Park Hee-Chul	11	0	2	0	2	0	15 (0)	15	0
3	(South Korea)	DF	Kim Gwang-Seok	18	0	2	0	6	0	26 (0)	26	0
4	(South Korea)	DF	Bae Seul-Ki	0	0	0	0	0	0	0	0	0
5	(South Korea)	DF	Lee Won-Jae	1 (1)	0	0	0	1	0	2 (1)	3	0
6	(South Korea)	MF	Shin Jin-Ho	2 (2)	0	0 (1)	0	0 (3)	0	2 (6)	8	0
7	(Serbia)	DF	Zoran Rendulić	6	0	1	0	5	1	12 (0)	12	1
8	(South Korea)	MF	Hwang Jin-Sung	14 (2)	1	1 (1)	0	6	1	21 (3)	24	2
9	(South Korea)	MF	Hwang Ji-Soo	9	0	1	0	2 (1)	0	12 (1)	13	0
10	(Ghana)	FW	Derek Asamoah	9 (4)	4	1	1	6	2	16 (4)	20	7
11	(South Korea)	FW	Park Sung-Ho	7 (7)	0	0 (1)	1	3 (3)	1	10 (11)	21	2
12	(South Korea)	GK	Hwang Kyo-Chung	0	0	0	0	0	0	0	0	0
13	(South Korea)	DF	Kim Won-Il	11 (1)	1	1	0	3 (1)	0	15 (2)	17	1
14	(South Korea)	MF	Kim Tae-Su	5 (1)	0	1	0	5	1	11 (1)	12	1
15	(South Korea)	DF	Jung Hong-Youn	2 (1)	0	0	0	2	0	4 (1)	5	0
16	(South Korea)	FW	Kim Jin-Yong	5 (5)	0	0	0	2 (2)	1	7 (7)	14	1
17	(South Korea)	DF	Shin Kwang-Hoon	16	0	2	0	5	0	23 (0)	23	0
18	(South Korea)	FW	Ko Mu-Yeol	10 (6)	1	1 (1)	2	2 (2)	0	13 (9)	22	3
19	(South Korea)	FW	Kim Sun-Woo	0 (1)	0	0	0	0	0	0 (1)	1	0
20	(South Korea)	MF	Shin Hyung-Min	16	0	2	1	6	0	24 (0)	24	1
21	(South Korea)	GK	Song Dong-Jin	0	0	0	0	0	0	0	0	0
22	(South Korea)	FW	No Byung-Jun	6 (9)	1	1 (1)	2	3 (3)	0	10 (13)	23	3
23	(South Korea)	DF	Yoon Joon-Sung	0	0	0	0	0	0	0	0	0
24	(South Korea)	MF	Kim Dae-Ho	7	1	1	0	4	1	12 (0)	12	2
26	(South Korea)	FW	Cho Chan-Ho	7 (3)	2	0	0	2 (4)	0	9 (7)	16	2
27	(Romania)	FW	Ianis Zicu	5 (8)	6	1	0	4	0	10 (8)	18	6
28	(South Korea)	DF	An Il-Joo	0	0	0	0	0	0	0	0	0
29	(South Korea)	MF	Lee Myung-Joo	11	1	2	0	1 (1)	0	14 (1)	15	1
30	(South Korea)	FW	Kim Chan-Hee	1	0	0	0	0 (1)	0	1 (1)	2	0
31	(South Korea)	GK	Kim Da-Sol	11	0	2	0	1	0	14 (0)	14	0
32	(South Korea)	FW	Kim Eun-Chong	0	0	0	0	0	0	0	0	0
33	(South Korea)	FW	Lee Kwang-Hoon	0	0	0	0	0	0	0	0	0
34	(South Korea)	MF	Yoon Won-Il	1	0	0	0	0	0	1 (0)	1	0
35	(South Korea)	MF	Hwang Jung-Soo	0	0	0	0	0	0	0	0	0
36	(South Korea)	DF	Moon Chang-Jin	0 (3)	0	0 (1)	0	0	0	0 (4)	4	0
77	(South Korea)	MF	Moon Kyu-Hyun	0	0	0	0	0	0	0	0	0

=== Goals and assists ===
Rank	Nation	Number	Name	K-League		KFA Cup		Champions League		Sum		Total
Rank	Nation	Number	Name	Goals	Assists	Goals	Assists	Goals	Assists	Goals	Assists	Total
1	(Ghana)	10	Derek Asamoah	4	1	1	0	2	0	7	1	8
2	(Romania)	27	Ianis Zicu	6	0	0	0	0	0	6	0	6
=	(South Korea)	18	Ko Mu-Yeol	1	3	2	0	0	0	3	3	6
3	(South Korea)	20	Shin Hyung-Min	0	2	1	0	0	2	1	4	5
4	(South Korea)	22	No Byung-Jun	1	0	2	1	0	0	3	1	4
=	(South Korea)	8	Hwang Jin-Sung	1	1	0	1	1	0	2	2	4
=	(South Korea)	14	Kim Tae-Su	0	2	0	1	1	0	1	3	4
5	(South Korea)	26	Cho Chan-Ho	2	1	0	0	0	0	2	1	3
=	(South Korea)	11	Park Sung-Ho	0	0	1	1	1	0	2	1	3
=	(South Korea)	29	Lee Myung-Joo	1	2	0	0	0	0	1	2	3
=	(South Korea)	17	Shin Kwang-Hoon	0	1	0	1	0	1	0	3	3
6	(South Korea)	24	Kim Dae-Ho	1	0	0	0	1	0	2	0	2
=	(South Korea)	6	Shin Jin-Ho	0	1	0	1	0	0	0	2	2
7	(South Korea)	13	Kim Won-Il	1	0	0	0	0	0	1	0	1
=	(Serbia)	7	Zoran Rendulić	0	0	0	0	1	0	1	0	1
=	(South Korea)	16	Kim Jin-Yong	0	0	0	0	1	0	1	0	1
=	(South Korea)	2	Park Hee-Chul	0	1	0	0	0	0	0	1	1
/	/	/	Own Goals	0	-	0	-	0	-	0	-	0
/	/	/	TOTALS	18	15	7	6	8	3	33	24	

=== Discipline ===
Position	Nation	Number	Name	K-League		KFA Cup		Champions League		Total	
Position	Nation	Number	Name	Yellow card	Red card	Yellow card	Red card	Yellow card	Red card	Yellow card	Red card
GK	(South Korea)	1	Shin Hwa-Yong	0	1	0	0	0	0	0	1
MF	(South Korea)	2	Park Hee-Chul	6	0	1	0	1	0	8	0
DF	(South Korea)	3	Kim Gwang-Seok	1	0	0	0	1	0	2	0
MF	(South Korea)	6	Shin Jin-Ho	0	0	0	0	1	0	1	0
DF	(Serbia)	7	Zoran Rendulić	3	0	0	0	0	0	3	0
MF	(South Korea)	8	Hwang Jin-Sung	6	0	0	0	0	0	6	0
MF	(South Korea)	9	Hwang Ji-Soo	0	0	0	0	1	0	1	0
FW	(Ghana)	10	Derek Asamoah	1	0	0	0	1	0	2	0
FW	(South Korea)	11	Park Sung-Ho	1	0	1	0	0	0	2	0
DF	(South Korea)	13	Kim Won-Il	2	0	1	0	2	0	5	0
FW	(South Korea)	16	Kim Jin-Yong	4	0	0	0	0	0	4	0
DF	(South Korea)	17	Shin Kwang-Hoon	3	1	0	0	2	0	5	1
FW	(South Korea)	18	Ko Mu-Yeol	1	0	0	0	0	0	1	0
MF	(South Korea)	20	Shin Hyung-Min	6	0	1	0	2	0	9	0
FW	(South Korea)	22	No Byung-Jun	1	0	0	0	1	0	2	0
MF	(South Korea)	24	Kim Dae-Ho	1	0	0	0	0	0	1	0
MF	(South Korea)	26	Cho Chan-Ho	1	0	0	0	0	0	1	0
FW	(Romania)	27	Ianis Zicu	1	0	0	0	0	0	1	0
MF	(South Korea)	29	Lee Myung-Joo	2	0	0	0	0	0	2	0
/	/	/	TOTALS	40	2	4	0	9	0	53	2
