= 2010 Lunar New Year Cup =

The 2010 Lunar New Year Cup is a football tournament held in Hong Kong on the fourth day of the Chinese New Year of the Tiger (2 February 2010).

== Format ==
The teams play against each other in 45-minute matches like TIM Trophy, but if the matches are goalless the matches are not decided by penalty shoot-outs.

== Participating teams ==
- (Hong Kong) Kitchee (host)
- (South Korea) Pohang Steelers
- (Hong Kong) Pegasus Invitation Team

== Squads ==
=== Kitchee ===
- Head coach: (Spain) Josep Gombau
- Coach: (Hong Kong) Cheng Siu Chung
- Executive Officer: (Hong Kong) Alex Chu Chi Kwong
- Manager: (Hong Kong) Ken Ng

No.	Pos.	Player	Date of birth (age)	Caps	Club
1	GK	Wang Zhenpeng	{{{age}}}		(Hong Kong) Kitchee
4	DF	Xavi Pérez	{{{age}}}		(Hong Kong) Kitchee
5	DF	Ubay Luzardo	{{{age}}}		(Hong Kong) Kitchee
7	FW	Edson Minga	{{{age}}}		(Hong Kong) Kitchee
8	MF	Li Ka Chun	{{{age}}}		(Hong Kong) Kitchee
9	MF	Liang Zicheng	{{{age}}}		(Hong Kong) Kitchee
10	MF	Lam Ka Wai	{{{age}}}		(Hong Kong) Kitchee
12	DF	Lo Kwan Yee	{{{age}}}		(Hong Kong) Kitchee
13	MF	Chan Man Fai	{{{age}}}		(Hong Kong) Kitchee
14	FW	Cheng Siu Wai	{{{age}}}		(Hong Kong) Kitchee
15	MF	Ngan Lok Fung	{{{age}}}		(Hong Kong) Kitchee
16	MF	Gao Wen	{{{age}}}		(Hong Kong) Kitchee
17	GK	Sergio Aure	{{{age}}}		(Hong Kong) Kitchee
18	MF	Baruc Nsue	{{{age}}}		(Hong Kong) Kitchee
19	FW	Cheng Lai Hin	{{{age}}}		(Hong Kong) Kitchee
20	DF	Li Hang Wui	{{{age}}}		(Hong Kong) Kitchee
21	DF	Tsang Kam To	{{{age}}}		(Hong Kong) Kitchee
25	MF	Yeung Ka Ching	{{{age}}}		(Hong Kong) Kitchee
27	DF	Liu Quankun	{{{age}}}		(Hong Kong) Kitchee
28	FW	Alex Akande	{{{age}}}		(Hong Kong) Kitchee
31	GK	Wong Tsz Him	{{{age}}}		(Hong Kong) Kitchee
33	MF	Albert Celades	{{{age}}}		(Hong Kong) Kitchee
38	DF	Agustín Aranzábal	{{{age}}}		(Hong Kong) Kitchee

=== Pohang Steelers ===
- Head coach: (Brazil) Waldemar Lemos
- Coach: (South Korea) Choi Moon-sik
- Interpreter: (South Korea) Na Young-joon
- Trainer: (South Korea) An Sung-hoon
- Manager: (South Korea) Shin Joo-hyun

No.	Pos.	Player	Date of birth (age)	Caps	Club
31	GK	(South Korea) Kim Da-sol	4 January 1989 (aged 21)		(South Korea) Pohang Steelers
21	GK	(South Korea) Song Dong-jin	12 May 1984 (aged 25)		(South Korea) Pohang Steelers
37	DF	(South Korea) Kang Dae-ho	23 November 1989 (aged 20)		(South Korea) Pohang Steelers
4	DF	(Japan) Kazunari Okayama	24 April 1978 (aged 31)		(South Korea) Pohang Steelers
36	DF	(South Korea) Kim Won-il	3 January 1982 (aged 28)		(South Korea) Pohang Steelers
33	DF	(South Korea) Lee Ki-dong	11 May 1984 (aged 25)		(South Korea) Pohang Steelers
15	DF	(South Korea) Cho Hong-kyu	24 July 1983 (aged 26)		(South Korea) Pohang Steelers
14	MF	(South Korea) Kim Ba-woo	12 January 1984 (aged 26)		(South Korea) Pohang Steelers
6	MF	(South Korea) Kim Gi-dong	12 January 1972 (aged 38)		(South Korea) Pohang Steelers
40	MF	(South Korea) Kim Dae-ho	15 May 1988 (aged 21)		(South Korea) Pohang Steelers
27	MF	(South Korea) Kim Chang-hoon	3 April 1987 (aged 22)		(South Korea) Pohang Steelers
28	MF	(South Korea) Song Chang-ho	20 February 1986 (aged 23)		(South Korea) Pohang Steelers
26	MF	(South Korea) Cho Chan-ho	10 April 1986 (aged 23)		(South Korea) Pohang Steelers
25	MF	(South Korea) Jung Seok-min	27 January 1988 (aged 22)		(South Korea) Pohang Steelers
23	FW	(South Korea) Yoo Chang-hyun	14 May 1985 (aged 24)		(South Korea) Pohang Steelers
29	FW	(South Korea) Choi Hyun-youn	16 April 1984 (aged 25)		(South Korea) Pohang Steelers
30	FW	(South Korea) Jung Jeong-seok	20 January 1988 (aged 22)		(South Korea) Pohang Steelers
9	FW	(Brazil) Alexsandro	6 November 1986 (aged 23)		(South Korea) Pohang Steelers
11	FW	(South Korea) Seol Ki-hyeon	8 January 1979 (aged 31)		(South Korea) Pohang Steelers

=== Pegasus Invitation Team ===
No.	Pos.	Player	Date of birth (age)	Caps	Club
1	GK	(Hong Kong) Yapp Hung Fai	21 March 1990 (aged 19)		(Hong Kong) TSW Pegasus
23	GK	(Hong Kong) Li Jian	19 September 1985 (aged 24)		(Hong Kong) TSW Pegasus
2	DF	(Brazil) Márcio Martins	30 April 1980 (aged 29)		(Hong Kong) TSW Pegasus
3	DF	(Hong Kong) Lau Nim Yat	11 July 1989 (aged 20)		(Hong Kong) TSW Pegasus
4	DF	(Hong Kong) Deng Jinghuang	24 January 1985 (aged 25)		(Hong Kong) TSW Pegasus
5	DF	(Ghana) Wisdom Fofo Agbo	25 June 1979 (aged 30)		(Hong Kong) TSW Pegasus
6	DF	(Hong Kong) Luk Koon Pong	1 August 1978 (aged 31)		(Hong Kong) TSW Pegasus
21	DF	(Hong Kong) Lai Man Fei	10 December 1988 (ages 21)		(Hong Kong) TSW Pegasus
25	DF	(Brazil) Sidraílson	26 February 1982 (aged 27)		(Hong Kong) South China
11	MF	(Brazil) Itaparica	8 July 1980 (aged 29)		(Hong Kong) TSW Pegasus
15	MF	(Hong Kong) Yuen Kin Man	19 January 1989 (aged 21)		(Hong Kong) TSW Pegasus
17	MF	(Hong Kong) Lee Hong Lim	29 September 1983 (aged 26)		(Hong Kong) TSW Pegasus
19	MF	(Hong Kong) Hinson Leung	25 November 1987 (aged 22)		(Hong Kong) South China
26	MF	(Hong Kong) Lai Yiu Cheong	25 September 1988 (aged 21)		(Hong Kong) TSW Pegasus
9	FW	(Hong Kong) Leung Tsz Chun	19 May 1985 (aged 24)		(Hong Kong) TSW Pegasus
18	FW	(China) Li Zhixing	8 November 1985 (aged 24)		(Hong Kong) TSW Pegasus
27	FW	(Brazil) Wellingsson	7 September 1989 (aged 20)		(Hong Kong) South China
28	FW	(Brazil) Tales Schütz	22 August 1981 (aged 28)		(Hong Kong) South China
32	FW	(Brazil) Mario Nascimento	11 November 1979 (aged 30)		(Hong Kong) TSW Pegasus
33	FW	(Brazil) Leo	19 July 1980 (aged 29)		(Hong Kong) South China

== Fixtures ==
Team	Pld	W	D	L	GF	GA	GD	Pts
(South Korea) Pohang Steelers	2	1	1	0	3	2	+1	4
(Hong Kong) Kitchee	2	1	1	0	2	1	+1	4
(Hong Kong) Pegasus Invitation Team	2	0	0	2	1	3	−2	0

All times given in Hong Kong Time (UTC+8).

2010-02-02
19:00

Kitchee (Hong Kong)	1–0	(Hong Kong) Pegasus Invitation Team
Alex 3'

Hong Kong Stadium, Hong Kong
Attendance: 4,922

2010-02-02
20:00

Pegasus Invitation Team (Hong Kong)	1–2	(South Korea) Pohang Steelers
Itaparica 26'		Alexsandro 7', 31'

Hong Kong Stadium, Hong Kong
Attendance: 4,922

2010-02-02
21:00

Kitchee (Hong Kong)	1–1	(South Korea) Pohang Steelers
Luzardo 30'		Kim Won-il 33'

Hong Kong Stadium, Hong Kong
Attendance: 4,922

== Top scorers ==
1 goal
