= Ko Ki-gu =

South Korean footballer (born 1980)

Ko Geon-woo 고건우
Personal information
- Date of birth: 31 July 1980 (age 46)
- Place of birth: South Korea
- Height: 1.87 m (6 ft 2 in)
- Positions: Forward; center-back

Youth career
- 1999–2002: Soongsil University

Senior career*
Years	Team	Apps	(Gls)
2003	Daejeon KHNP	8	(1)
2004–2005	Bucheon SK	29	(4)
2006–2007	Pohang Steelers	41	(10)
2008–2009	Chunnam Dragons	26	(3)
2010	Pohang Steelers	7	(1)
2010	→ Daejeon Citizen (loan)	6	(0)
2011–2012	Daejeon KHNP	44	(7)
2013	Yanbian Baekdu Tigers	27	(1)
2014	TOT	22	(0)
Total		117	(19)

International career^{‡}
2008	South Korea	4	(0)
- * Club domestic league appearances and goals as of June 07, 2014 ‡ National team caps and goals as of June 07, 2014

Ko Geon-woo (Korean: 고건우; Hanja: 高漧禑; born 31 July 1980), formerly known as Ko Ki-Gu (Korean: 고기구; Hanja: 高基衢), is a South Korean footballer who plays as a forward.

His first A-match was at the East Asian Cup 2008 against China on February 17, 2008. In this match, he assisted the last goal, which was scored by Kwak Tae-Hwi.

He was member of South Korea of 2010 FIFA World Cup qualification. He played two games that played in Seoul, South Korea. The opponents were Jordan and North Korea, respectively.

== Career statistics ==
=== Club ===
Club performance			League		Cup		League Cup		Continental		Total	
Season	Club	League	Apps	Goals	Apps	Goals	Apps	Goals	Apps	Goals	Apps	Goals
South Korea			League		KFA Cup		League Cup		Asia		Total	
2003	Daejeon KHNP	National League	8	1			-		-			
2004	Bucheon SK	K-League	7	0	5	1	11	0	-		23	1
2005	Bucheon SK	K-League	22	4	2	0	8	1	-		32	5
2006	Pohang Steelers	K-League	22	8	1	0	5	1	-		28	9
2007	Pohang Steelers	K-League	19	2	4	0	5	0	-		28	2
2008	Chunnam Dragons	K-League	17	3	0	0	1	0	2	1	20	4
2009	Chunnam Dragons	K-League	9	0	1	0	3	0	-		13	0
2010	Pohang Steelers	K-League	7	1	0	0	0	0			7	1
2010	Daejeon Citizen	K-League	6	0	1	0	0	0	-		7	0
2011	Daejeon KHNP	National League					-		-			
Total	South Korea		117	19	14	1	33	2	2	1	166	23
Career total			117	19	14	1	33	2	2	1	166	23

=== International ===
National team	Year	Apps	Goals
South Korea	2008	4	0
Total		4	0

Statistics correct as of matches played 22 June 2008

International appearances and goals
#	Date	Venue	Opponent	Result	Goal	Competition
1	February 17, 2008	Olympic Sports Center, Chongqing, China	China	3–2	0	2008 East Asian Football Championship
2	February 20, 2008	Olympic Sports Center, Chongqing, China	North Korea	1–1	0	2008 East Asian Football Championship
3	May 31, 2008	Seoul World Cup Stadium, Seoul, South Korea	Jordan	2–2	0	2010 FIFA World Cup qualification Round 3
4	June 22, 2008	Seoul World Cup Stadium, Seoul, South Korea	North Korea	0–0	0	2010 FIFA World Cup qualification Round 3
