= Jeong Seok-min =

South Korean footballer (born 1988)

Jeong Seok-Min
Personal information
- Full name: Jeong Seok-Min
- Date of birth: 27 January 1988 (age 38)
- Place of birth: South Korea
- Height: 1.83 m (6 ft 0 in)
- Position: Midfielder

Team information
- Current team: Penang FA
- Number: 6

Youth career
- Inje University

Senior career*
Years	Team	Apps	(Gls)
2010–2011	Pohang Steelers	5	(1)
2012	Jeju United	3	(0)
2013–2014	Daejeon Citizen	69	(9)
2015	Jeonnam Dragons	26	(0)
2016–	Penang FA	10	(5)
- * Club domestic league appearances and goals as of 17 November 2014

- Jeong Seok-min
- Hangul: 정석민
- Hanja: 鄭錫珉
- RR: Jeong Seokmin
- MR: Chŏng Sŏngmin

Jeong Seok-Min (Korean: 정석민; born 27 January 1988) is a South Korean footballer who plays as a midfielder for the Penang FA in the Malaysia Super League

== Club career ==
Jeong was one of the Pohang Steelers' draft picks for the 2010 K-League season. He made his debut for the Steelers in a league match against FC Seoul on 27 March 2010, and scored his first professional goal in the Steeler's loss to Jeju United on 8 May 2010. Jeong remains with Pohang for the 2011 K-League season.

On 9 January 2012, Jeong moved from Pohang to Jeju United. He currently plays with Penang FA.

== Club career statistics ==
As of 9 January 2013

Club performance			League		Cup		League Cup		Continental		Total	
Season	Club	League	Apps	Goals	Apps	Goals	Apps	Goals	Apps	Goals	Apps	Goals
Korea Republic			League		FA Cup		K-League Cup		Asia		Total	
2010	Pohang Steelers	K-League	3	1	1	1	2	0	1	0	7	2
2011	Pohang Steelers	K-League	2	0	0	0	6	2	-		8	2
2012	Jeju United	K-League	3	0	1	0	-		-		4	0
Career total			8	1	2	1	8	2	1	0	19	4
