= Lee Gi-dong =

South Korean footballer (born 1984)

Lee Gi-Dong
Personal information
- Full name: Lee Gi-Dong
- Date of birth: 11 May 1984 (age 42)
- Place of birth: South Korea
- Height: 1.91 m (6 ft 3 in)
- Position: Forward

Youth career
- Yonsei University

Senior career*
Years	Team	Apps	(Gls)
2009	Cheongju Jikji	32	(21)
2010–2011	Pohang Steelers	2	(1)
2011	Ulsan Hyundai	0	(0)
- * Club domestic league appearances and goals as of 30 September 2011

- Lee Gi-dong
- Hangul: 이기동
- Hanja: 李期東
- RR: I Gidong
- MR: I Kidong

Lee Gi-dong (Korean: 이기동; born 11 May 1984) is a South Korean footballer.

== Career ==
He is the first player to advance from the K3 League to the K League 1.
