= Ko Moo-yeol =

South Korean footballer (born 1990)

Ko Moo-yeol 고무열
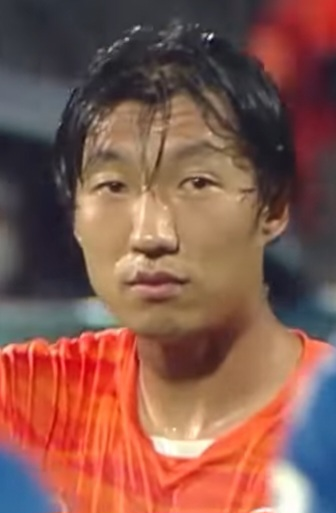

Personal information
- Full name: Ko Moo-yeol
- Date of birth: 5 September 1990 (age 36)
- Place of birth: Busan, South Korea
- Height: 1.85 m (6 ft 1 in)
- Position: Forward

Team information
- Current team: Seoul E-Land FC
- Number: 95

Senior career*
Years	Team	Apps	(Gls)
2011–2015	Pohang Steelers	153	(34)
2016–2019	Jeonbuk Hyundai Motors	42	(1)
2018–2019	→ Asan Mugunghwa (army)	52	(18)
2020–2023	Gangwon FC	24	(9)
2023	Chungnam Asan	9	(1)
2023	Suwon Samsung Bluewings	6	(0)
2024–	Seoul E-Land FC	3	(1)

International career^{‡}
2010–2012	South Korea U-23	2	(0)
2013–	South Korea	2	(0)
- * Club domestic league appearances and goals as of 22 February 2024 ‡ National team caps and goals as of 28 July 2013

- Ko Moo-yeol
- Hangul: 고무열
- Hanja: 高武烈
- RR: Go Muyeol
- MR: Ko Muyŏl

Ko Moo-yeol (Korean: 고무열; born 5 September 1990) is a South Korean footballer who plays as forward for Seoul E-Land FC in the K League 2.

== Club career ==
On 22 February 2024, Moo-yeol joined Seoul E-Land FC.

== Club career statistics ==
As of 5 November 2011

Club performance			League		Cup		League Cup		Intercontinental		Total	
Season	Club	League	Apps	Goals	Apps	Goals	Apps	Goals	Apps	Goals	Apps	Goals
South Korea			League		KFA Cup		League Cup		Asia		Total	
2011	Pohang Steelers	K-League	24	9	4	1	4	1	-	-	32	11
2012	Pohang Steelers	K-League	39	6	4	1	-	-	4	0	47	7
Career total			63	15	8	2	4	1	4	0	79	18

== Honours ==
=== Club ===
Pohang Steelers

- K League Classic (1): 2013
- Korean FA Cup (2): 2012, 2013

Jeonbuk Hyundai Motors

- K League Classic (1) : 2017
- AFC Champions League (1): 2016

Awards
Preceded by Incumbent	K League Young Player Award; 2013	Succeeded by Incumbent
