= Zulu (footballer) =

Brazilian footballer (born 1983)

Personal information
- Full name: Carlos Eduardo Alves Albina
- Date of birth: 5 September 1983 (age 43)
- Place of birth: Tramandaí, Brazil
- Height: 1.91 m (6 ft 3 in)
- Position: Forward

Senior career*
Years	Team	Apps	(Gls)
2001–2003	Novo Hamburgo		
2004	Grêmio	2	(0)
2004	Rio Branco-SP		
2005	XV de Piracicaba		
2005	Brasil de Pelotas		
2006	Villa Nova		
2007	União Barbarense		
2007	Esportivo		
2007	Metropolitano		
2008	Santa Cruz-RS		
2008–2009	Criciúma		
2009	→ Atlético Paranaense (loan)	8	(0)
2009	Atlético Goianiense		
2010	Mogi Mirim		
2010	ABC		
2010	Pohang Steelers		
2011–2014	Juventude	132	(66)
2014	Icasa		
2014	Fortaleza		
2015	Juventude		
2016	Novo Hamburgo		
2016	Brusque		
2017	Esportivo		
2018	Brasiliense		
2019	Esportivo		
2019	Inter de Lages		
2020	União Frederiquense		
2020	Bagé		
- * Club domestic league appearances and goals

Carlos Eduardo Alves Albina (born 5 September 1983), better known as Zulu, is a Brazilian former professional footballer who played as a forward.

== Career ==
Born in Tramandaí, Zulu played most of his career in clubs in Rio Grande do Sul, playing briefly for Grêmio in 2004, and especially Juventude, where he became closely identified with the fans. He also played in Série A of the Brazilian Championship with Atlético Paranaense, Korean football with Pohang Steelers and ABC, where he won Série C in 2010. He ended his career in 2020, at GE Bagé, after playing for União Frederiquense.

== Honours ==
ABC

- Campeonato Brasileiro Série C: 2010

Juventude

- Copa FGF: 2011, 2012
