= Kim Jung-bin =

South Korean footballer (born 1987)

Kim Jung-Bin
Personal information
- Full name: Kim Jung-Bin
- Date of birth: 23 August 1987 (age 39)
- Place of birth: South Korea
- Height: 1.76 m (5 ft 9 1/2 in)
- Position: Midfielder

Team information
- Current team: Gyeongnam FC
- Number: 22

Youth career
- Sunmoon University

Senior career*
Years	Team	Apps	(Gls)
2011–2013	Pohang Steelers	0	(0)
2012–2013	→ Sangju Sangmu (army)	2	(0)
2014–2015	Suwon FC	51	(4)
2016–	Gyeongnam FC	32	(0)
- * Club domestic league appearances and goals as of 5 November 2017

Kim Jung-Bin (Korean: 김정빈; born 23 August 1987) is a South Korean former footballer who played as midfielder for Gyeongnam FC in his last season.

== Career ==
He was selected by Pohang Steelers in the 2011 K League draft.

He finished his military duty in September 2013 and returned to the Steelers.

He was released by Pohang and joined Suwon FC before 2014 season starts and made 19 appearances and 2 goals. He signed with Suwon FC on a permanent basis in 2014.
