= Hwang Jin-sung =

South Korean footballer (born 1984)

Hwang Jin-sung 황진성，黄镇晟
Personal information
- Full name: Hwang Jin-sung
- Date of birth: May 5, 1984 (age 42)
- Place of birth: Seoul, South Korea
- Height: 1.77 m (5 ft 10 in)
- Position: Attacking midfielder

Team information
- Current team: Gangwon FC
- Number: 8

Senior career*
Years	Team	Apps	(Gls)
2003–2013	Pohang Steelers	234	(40)
2014	AFC Tubize	12	(3)
2015	Kyoto Sanga FC	8	(0)
2015	Fagiano Okayama	9	(0)
2016	Seongnam FC	10	(1)
2017–	Gangwon FC	47	(8)

International career^{‡}
2012	South Korea	2	(0)
- * Club domestic league appearances and goals as of 1 January 2019 ‡ National team caps and goals as of 28 November 2011

Hwang Jin-sung (黄镇晟，born May 5, 1984) is a South Korean footballer. He has played for Gangwon FC.

== Club statistics ==
Club performance			League		Cup		League Cup		Continental		Total	
Season	Club	League	Apps	Goals	Apps	Goals	Apps	Goals	Apps	Goals	Apps	Goals
South Korea			League		KFA Cup		League Cup		Asia		Total	
2003	Pohang Steelers	K League 1	19	1	3	0	—		—		22	1
2004	Pohang Steelers	K League 1	16	1	1	0	8	2	—		25	3
2005	Pohang Steelers	K League 1	21	2	3	1	9	0	—		33	3
2006	Pohang Steelers	K League 1	12	3	1	0	11	1	—		24	4
2007	Pohang Steelers	K League 1	17	1	2	1	6	1	—		25	3
2008	Pohang Steelers	K League 1	22	2	3	1	2	0	3	1	30	4
2009	Pohang Steelers	K League 1	15	2	0	0	3	2	8	3	26	7
2010	Pohang Steelers	K League 1	22	4	1	0	3	1	7	0	33	5
2011	Pohang Steelers	K League 1	27	6	3	0	3	0	—		33	6
2012	Pohang Steelers	K League 1	41	12	4	2	—		5	0	50	14
2013	Pohang Steelers	K League 1	22	6	2	0	—		3	1	27	7
Career total			234	40	24	5	45	7	26	3	329	55

== Honors ==
=== Club ===
Pohang Steelers

- K-League Champion : 2007
- Korean FA Cup (1): 2008
- K-League Cup (1): 2009
- AFC Champions League (1): 2009
- FORTIS Hong Kong New Years cup(1):2010
- 2012 K League Best XI
