= Inje University =

University in Gimhae, South Korea

Inje University 인제대학교 (仁濟大學校)
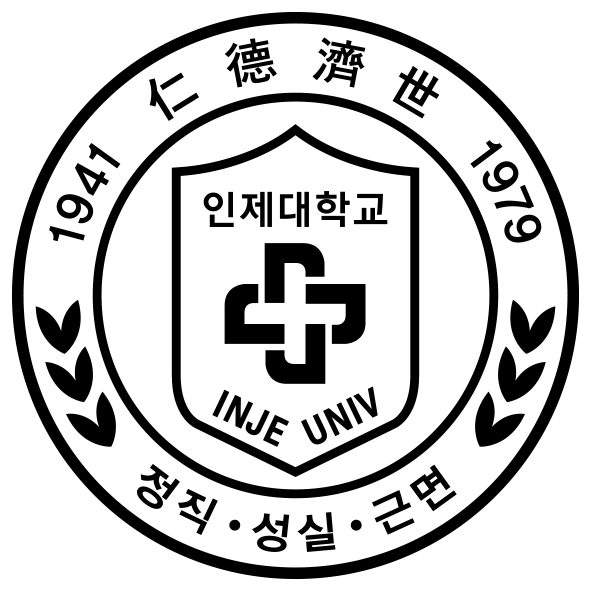
- Motto: Honesty, Sincerity, Diligence.
- Type: Private
- Established: 1979
- President: Jeon, Minhyon
- Total staff: 1,352 : 884 faculties, 340 staffs, 128 assistants (2024)
- Undergraduates: 9,017 (April 1, 2024)
- Location: Gimhae, South Korea; 35°14′55″N 128°54′09″E
- Campus: Gimhae campus 197, Inje-ro, Gimhae-si, Gyeongsangnam-do, Republic of Korea; Busan campus 75, Bokji-ro, Busanjin-gu, Busan, Republic of Korea
- Mascot: polar bear, crane, chrysanthemum, pine
- Website: http://www.inje.ac.kr/english/

Inje University (Korean: 인제대학교) is a private university founded in 1941, located in Gimhae, South Korea. As of April, 2024, it had 884 faculty members, 340 staff members, 9,017 Undergraduate students and 1,224 Graduate students. The founding mission is to save the world through love and virtue. The educational goals are: to preserve nature; to value human lives and philanthropy. The school precepts are honesty, sincerity, and diligence.

== History ==
It started as surgical clinic, "Paik Clinic" opened by Dr. In-Je Paik in 1941. He then donated all of his assets and founded Paik Hospital in 1946, the first civilian non-profit organization in Korea. In 1979 Inje Medical College opened, and in 1989 Inje College was promoted to Inje University, with Dr. Nakwhan Paik inaugurated as the first President of Inje University. Current, the 9th, president is Dr. Jeon, Minhyon who was appointed in September 2023.
