= Ahn Tae-eun =

South Korean footballer (born 1985)

Ahn Tae-Eun
Personal information
- Full name: Ahn Tae-Eun
- Date of birth: September 17, 1985 (age 41)
- Place of birth: Haenam, Jeonnam, South Korea
- Height: 1.76 m (5 ft 9 in)
- Positions: Right back; left back

Youth career
- 2003–2005: Chosun University

Senior career*
Years	Team	Apps	(Gls)
2006–2009	FC Seoul	42	(0)
2010	Pohang Steelers	4	(0)
2011	Incheon United	7	(0)

International career
2004–2005	South Korea U-20	21	(0)
2006	South Korea U-23	2	(0)
- * Club domestic league appearances and goals as of 31 October 2011

Ahn Tae-Eun (born September 17, 1985) is a South Korean footballer who is currently without a club. He has previously played for the Pohang Steelers, FC Seoul and Incheon United.

== Club career statistics ==
Club performance			League		Cup		League Cup		Continental		Total	
Season	Club	League	Apps	Goals	Apps	Goals	Apps	Goals	Apps	Goals	Apps	Goals
South Korea			League		KFA Cup		League Cup		Asia		Total	
2006	FC Seoul	K-League	14	0	3	0	12	0	-		29	0
2007	FC Seoul	K-League	2	0	0	0	2	0	-		4	0
2008	FC Seoul	K-League	8	0	0	0	2	0	-		10	0
2009	FC Seoul	K-League	18	0	0	0	1	0	3	0	22	0
2010	Pohang Steelers	K-League	4	0	0	0	4	0	1	0	9	0
2011	Incheon United	K-League	7	0	0	0	2	0	-		9	0
Career total			53	0	3	0	23	0	4	0	83	0
