= Choi Hyun-yeon =

South Korean footballer

Choi Hyun-Yeon
Personal information
- Full name: Choi Hyun-yeon
- Date of birth: 16 April 1984 (age 42)
- Place of birth: South Korea
- Height: 1.80 m (5 ft 11 in)
- Position: Midfielder

Team information
- Current team: South Korea U20 (assistant manager)

Youth career
- University of Ulsan

Senior career*
| Years | Team | Apps | (Gls) |
| 2006–2009 | Jeju United | 80 | (8) |
| 2010–2011 | Pohang Steelers | 20 | (2) |
| 2011–2014 | Gyeongnam FC | 52 | (3) |
| 2014 | Zhejiang Yiteng | 13 | (0) |
| 2015 | Kuala Lumpur FA | 23 | (3) |
| 2016 | Navbahor | 7 | (0) |
| 2017 | Gresik United | 6 | (0) |
| Total | | 201 | (8) |
- * Club domestic league appearances and goals

Choi Hyun-Yeon (Korean: 최현연, born 16 April 1984) is a South Korean football coach and former footballer he is the currently assistant manager of South Korea U20.
