= Kim Sun-woo (footballer, born 1983) =

South Korean footballer

Personal information
- Date of birth: October 17, 1983 (age 43)
- Place of birth: South Korea
- Height: 2.02 m (6 ft 8 in)
- Position: Forward

Youth career
- 2003–2006: Dongguk University

Senior career*
Years	Team	Apps	(Gls)
2007–2008	Incheon United	10	(0)
2009–2010	Changwon City	28	(4)
2011	Ulsan Hyundai Mipo Dockyard	7	(0)
2011–2012	Pohang Steelers	7	(0)
2013	Seongnam Ilhwa Chunma	2	(0)
- * Club domestic league appearances and goals as of 10 December 2013

- Kim Sun-woo
- Hangul: 김선우
- Hanja: 金善友
- RR: Gim Seonu
- MR: Kim Sŏnu

Kim Sun-woo (born October 17, 1983) is a South Korean football player who played for Seongnam Ilhwa Chunma.

Kim previously played for Incheon United and Pohang Steelers in the K League.
