= Alexandro (footballer) =

Brazilian footballer (born 1986)

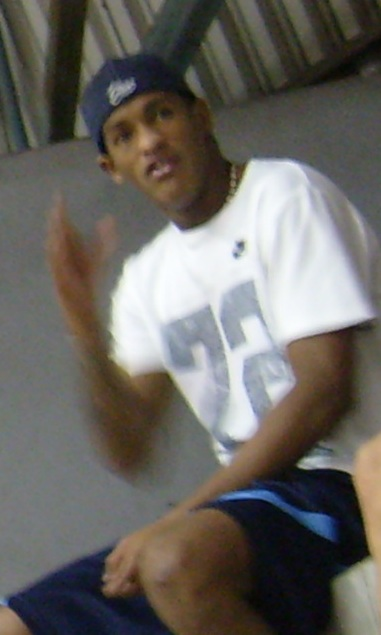
- Alexandro in 2007

Personal information
- Full name: Alexsandro da Silva Batista
- Date of birth: November 6, 1986 (age 40)
- Place of birth: Cabo Frio, RJ, Brazil
- Height: 1.74 m (5 ft 9 in)
- Position: Striker

Team information
- Current team: Sampaio Corrêa RJ

Youth career
- 2003–2004: Real Central
- 2004–2005: Roma

Senior career*
Years	Team	Apps	(Gls)
2005–2007	Cabofriense		
2007	→ Selangor (loan)		
2008	→ Joinville (loan)		
2008	Resende		
2008	Botafogo		
2009	Santo André		
2009	América		
2010	Pohang Steelers		
2010	Duque de Caxias		
2010	Santa Cruz		
2010–2011	Resende		
2011	Náutico		
2011–2012	Macaé		
2012	Tupi		
2013	Bangu		
2013	Penapolense		
2013	→ Icasa (loan)		
2014	→ Ponte Preta (loan)		
2015	→ Emirates (loan)		
2015	→ Bahia (loan)		
2015–2016	→ Ponte Preta (loan)		
2016–2017	→ Paysandu (loan)		
2017	→ Novorizontino (loan)		
2017	Oeste		
2018	Portuguesa RJ		
2018	Sampaio Corrêa		
2019	Resende		
2019	Guarany		
2019–	Sampaio Corrêa RJ		
- * Club domestic league appearances and goals

Alexsandro da Silva Batista, known as Alexandro, (born November 6, 1986) is a Brazilian professional footballer who plays as a striker for Sampaio Corrêa RJ.

Alexandro previously made six Campeonato Brasileiro appearances for Botafogo.

== Honours ==
- Campeonato Carioca Second Level: 2007, 2009
- Campeonato Carioca Second Level top scorer: 2009
