= Almir (footballer, born 1982) =

Brazilian footballer

Personal information
- Full name: Almir Lopes de Luna
- Date of birth: 20 May 1982 (age 44)
- Place of birth: João Pessoa, Brazil
- Height: 1.77 m (5 ft 10 in)
- Positions: Attacking midfielder; second striker

Team information
- Current team: Treze

Youth career
- 1997–1998: Santos
- 1999–2001: Botafogo

Senior career*
Years	Team	Apps	(Gls)
2001–2006	Botafogo		
2006	→ Ponte Preta (loan)	26	(4)
2007–2009	Ulsan Hyundai	82	(21)
2008	→ Atlético Mineiro (loan)	26	(5)
2010	Pohang Steelers	25	(4)
2011	Incheon United	5	(0)
2012	Bangu	6	(3)
2012	→ Figueirense (loan)	13	(0)
2013	Al-Salmiya	13	(0)
2013	América de Natal	13	(1)
2014–2018	Bangu	2	(0)
2014	→ Vila Nova (loan)	5	(0)
2015	→ Flamengo (loan)	7	(0)
2019	Brasiliense	2	(0)
2020	Treze	0	(0)
- * Club domestic league appearances and goals as of 19:43, 19 January 2020 (UTC)

Almir Lopes de Luna (born 20 May 1982, in João Pessoa), or simply Almir, is a Brazilian footballer who plays as an attacking midfielder for Treze.
