= Lee Seul-gi =

South Korean footballer (born 1986)

Lee Seul-Gi
Personal information
- Full name: Lee Seul-Gi
- Date of birth: 24 September 1986 (age 40)
- Place of birth: South Korea
- Height: 1.86 m (6 ft 1 in)
- Position: Defensive midfielder

Team information
- Current team: FC Anyang
- Number: 10

Youth career
- 2005–2008: Dongguk University

Senior career*
Years	Team	Apps	(Gls)
2009–2010	Daegu FC	46	(4)
2011	Pohang Steelers	1	(0)
2012–2013	Daejeon Citizen	5	(0)
2014	Hwaseong FC		
2015	Incheon United	1	(0)
2016–	FC Anyang	2	(0)
- * Club domestic league appearances and goals as of 1 December 2016

- Lee Seul-gi
- Hangul: 이슬기
- Hanja: 李슬기
- RR: I Seulgi
- MR: I Sŭlgi

Lee Seul-Gi (Korean: 이슬기; born 24 September 1986) is a South Korean football midfielder, who currently plays for FC Anyang in K League Challenge.

== Club career ==
Lee Seul-Gi joined Daegu FC from Dongguk University in 2009, being part of the draft that year. On 8 March 2009, Lee made his Daegu FC first-team debut in a match against Seongnam Ilhwa Chunma. On 22 March 2009, Lee scored his first goal against Pohang Steelers. He scored his 2nd goal in the 1–2 loss to Incheon United at the Incheon Munhak Stadium on 2 May. Lee scored a further goal in an away match against Ulsan Hyundai Horang-i in a 1–3 loss on 12 July. Lee continued to play a major role for the club during the 2010 season, but only found the net once in 23 games.

On 29 November 2010, he moved to Pohang Steelers in a swap deal, with Song Chang-Ho moving to Daegu.

In November 2011, he was traded to Daejeon Citizen FC along with Kim Dong-Hee for veteran forward Park Sung-Ho.

== Club career statistics ==
As of 28 November 2011

Club performance			League		Cup		League Cup		Total	
Season	Club	League	Apps	Goals	Apps	Goals	Apps	Goals	Apps	Goals
South Korea			League		KFA Cup		League Cup		Total	
2009	Daegu FC	K-League	25	3	2	1	4	0	31	4
2010	Daegu FC	K-League	20	1	1	0	2	0	23	1
2011	Pohang Steelers	K-League	1	0	0	0	4	0	5	0
2012	Daejeon Citizen	K-League								
Career total			46	4	3	1	10	0	59	5
