= Kim Jung-kyum =

South Korean footballer (born 1976)

Kim Jung-Kyum 김정겸
Personal information
- Full name: Kim Jung-Kyum
- Date of birth: 9 June 1976 (age 50)
- Place of birth: South Korea
- Height: 1.72 m (5 ft 8 in)
- Position: Midfielder

Youth career
- 1995–1998: Dongguk University

Senior career*
Years	Team	Apps	(Gls)
1999–2004	Chunnam Dragons	93	(1)
2005–2007	Jeonbuk Hyndai	45	(1)
2008–2011	Pohang Steelers	43	(2)
2012–2013	Loyola Meralco Sparks		

International career^{‡}
2003–2004	South Korea	7	(0)
- * Club domestic league appearances and goals as of 28 April 2012 ‡ National team caps and goals as of 7 October 2008

- Kim Jung-kyum
- Hangul: 김정겸
- Hanja: 金正謙
- RR: Gim Jeonggyeom
- MR: Kim Chŏnggyŏm

Kim Jung-kyum (born 9 June 1976) is a South Korean retired football midfielder.

He represented the national team in 7 matches and also formerly played for Chunnam Dragons, Jeonbuk Hyundai Motors and Pohang Steelers in the South Korean K-League.

== Club career ==
Kim Jung-kyum joined to Chunnam Dragons in 1999, after has contributed to the 2003 Korean FA Cup runner-up. In 2005, Jeonbuk Hyundai Motors agreed a player swap with Park Jae-hong going in the opposite direction, after has contributed to the win for 2005 Korean FA Cup and 2006 AFC Champions League. In 2008, he moved to Pohang Steelers. On 2 June 2011, his club Pohang terminated the contract with him for betting on League Cup match after receiving a tip-off from an opposition player involved in the match-fixing.

== International career ==
Between 2003 and 2004, Kim Jung-Kyum won a total of 7 international caps for the South Korea national team. He made his South Korea national team debut on 25 September 2003 in a A-match against Vietnam at the 2004 AFC Asian Cup qualification, who played for 2004 AFC Asian Cup.

== Club career statistics ==
Club performance			League		Cup		League Cup		Continental		Total	
Season	Club	League	Apps	Goals	Apps	Goals	Apps	Goals	Apps	Goals	Apps	Goals
South Korea			League		KFA Cup		League Cup		Asia		Total	
1999	Chunnam Dragons	K-League	7	0	?	?	6	0	?	?		
2000	Chunnam Dragons	K-League	22	1	?	?	7	0	-			
2001	Chunnam Dragons	K-League	16	0	?	?	0	0	-			
2002	Chunnam Dragons	K-League	0	0	?	?	5	0	-			
2003	Chunnam Dragons	K-League	27	0	4	0	-		-		31	0
2004	Chunnam Dragons	K-League	21	0	3	0	5	1	-		29	1
2005	Jeonbuk Hyundai Motors	K-League	22	1	5	0	12	0	-		39	1
2006	Jeonbuk Hyundai Motors	K-League	13	0	1	0	0	0	4	0	18	0
2007	Jeonbuk Hyundai Motors	K-League	10	0	1	0	2	0	0	0	13	0
2008	Pohang Steelers	K-League	3	0	1	0	0	0	0	0	4	0
2009	Pohang Steelers	K-League	18	1	0	0	5	0	13	0	36	1
2010	Pohang Steelers	K-League	14	1	1	0	2	0	5	0	22	1
2011	Pohang Steelers	K-League	8	0	0	0	1	0	-		9	0
Total	South Korea		184	4			44	1				
Career total			184	4			44	1				

== Honours ==
=== Individual ===
- Tongyeong Cup MVP: 2004

=== Club ===
Chunnam Dragons

- Asian Cup Winners Cup Runners-up: 1999
- K-League Cup Runners-up: 2000
- Korean FA Cup Runners-up: 2003

Jeonbuk Hyundai Motors

- Korean FA Cup Champions: 2005
- Korean Super Cup Runners-up: 2006
- AFC Champions League Champions: 2006

Pohang Steelers

- Korean FA Cup Champions: 2008
