= Cho Hong-kyu =

South Korean footballer (born 1983)

Cho Hong-Kyu
Personal information
- Full name: Cho Hong-Kyu
- Date of birth: 24 July 1983 (age 43)
- Place of birth: Busan, South Korea
- Height: 1.85 m (6 ft 1 in)
- Position: Defender

Senior career*
Years	Team	Apps	(Gls)
2006–2008	Daegu FC	34	(0)
2009–2010	Pohang Steelers	7	(0)
2011	Daejeon Citizen	7	(1)
- * Club domestic league appearances and goals as of 31 October 2011

- Cho Hong-kyu
- Hangul: 조홍규
- Hanja: 曺弘圭
- RR: Jo Honggyu
- MR: Cho Honggyu

Cho Hong-Kyu (Korean: 조홍규; born 24 July 1983) is a South Korean football player who previously played for Daegu FC, Pohang Steelers and Daejeon Citizen.

== Club career ==
Cho joined Daegu FC as a draft player for the 2006 season. While little more than a squad player during 2006 making only intermittent appearances during the season, Cho was a regular starter during the 2007 season. Seeing little matchplay in 2008, Cho transferred to the Pohang Steelers for the 2009 season. Despite the move, Cho still struggled to establish himself as a first choice at the Steelers, and has made the move to Daejeon Citizen for the 2011 K-League season.

== Club career statistics ==
As of 31 October 2011

Club performance			League		Cup		League Cup		Continental		Total	
Season	Club	League	Apps	Goals	Apps	Goals	Apps	Goals	Apps	Goals	Apps	Goals
South Korea			League		KFA Cup		League Cup		Asia		Total	
2006	Daegu FC	K-League	11	0	0	0	1	0	-		12	0
2007	Daegu FC	K-League	18	0	0	0	9	0	-		27	0
2008	Daegu FC	K-League	5	0	0	0	1	0	-		6	0
2009	Pohang Steelers	K-League	4	0	1	0	3	0	1	0	9	0
2010	Pohang Steelers	K-League	3	0	0	0	1	0	2	0	6	0
2011	Daejeon Citizen	K-League	7	1	0	0	1	0	-		8	1
Career total			48	0	1	0	16	0	3	0	68	1
