= Hwang Kyo-chung =

South Korean footballer (born 1985)

Hwang Kyo-Chung
Personal information
- Full name: Hwang Kyo-Chung
- Date of birth: 9 April 1985 (age 41)
- Place of birth: South Korea
- Height: 1.86 m (6 ft 1 in)
- Position: Goalkeeper

Team information
- Current team: Ulsan Hyundai Mipo

Youth career
- 2004–2007: Hanyang University

Senior career*
Years	Team	Apps	(Gls)
2008–2009	Gimhae City	31	(0)
2010–2013	Pohang Steelers	5	(0)
2014–2015	Gangwon FC	34	(0)
2016–	Ulsan Hyundai Mipo		
- * Club domestic league appearances and goals as of 20 December 2015

- Hwang Kyo-chung
- Hangul: 황교충
- Hanja: 黃敎忠
- RR: Hwang Gyochung
- MR: Hwang Kyoch'ung

Hwang Kyo-Chung (Korean: 황교충; born 9 April 1985) is a South Korean footballer who plays as goalkeeper for Ulsan Hyundai Mipo in the Korea National League.

== Club career statistics ==
As of 13 December 2014

Club performance			League		Cup		League Cup		Continental		Total	
Season	Club	League	Apps	Goals	Apps	Goals	Apps	Goals	Apps	Goals	Apps	Goals
South Korea			League		KFA Cup		League Cup		ACL		Total	
2008	Gimhae City	Korea National League	13	0	2	0	-		-		15	0
2009	Gimhae City	Korea National League	18	0	1	0	-		-		19	0
2010	Pohang Steelers	K-League / K League Classic	4	0	0	0	0	0	0	0	4	0
2011	Pohang Steelers	K-League / K League Classic	1	0	0	0	0	0	-		1	0
2012	Pohang Steelers	K-League / K League Classic	0	0	0	0	-		0	0	0	0
2013	Pohang Steelers	K-League / K League Classic	0	0	0	0	-		0	0	0	0
2014	Gangwon FC	K League Challenge	21	0	2	0	-		-		23	0
Career total			57	0	5	0	0	0	0	0	62	0
