= Kang Ji-yong =

South Korean footballer (1989–2025)

Kang Ji-Yong
Personal information
- Date of birth: 23 November 1989
- Place of birth: South Korea
- Date of death: 23 April 2025 (aged 35)
- Height: 1.87 m (6 ft 2 in)
- Position: Defender

Youth career
- 2008: Hanyang University

Senior career*
Years	Team	Apps	(Gls)
2009–2011	Pohang Steelers	4	(0)
2012	Busan IPark	1	(0)
2013	Gyeongju Citizen		
2014–2016	Bucheon FC	101	(6)
2017	Gangwon FC	25	(1)
2018	Incheon United	4	(0)
2020	Gimpo Citizen	0	(0)
2021	Gangneung Citizen	24	(2)
2022	Cheonan City	15	(0)

International career
2009	South Korea U23		
- * Club domestic league appearances and goals

Kang Ji-Yong (Korean: 강지용; 23 November 1989 – 22 April 2025) was a South Korean professional footballer who played as defender. He changed his name from Kang Dae-Ho to Kang Ji-Yong.

== Career ==
Kang was selected by Pohang Steelers in the 2009 K League draft.

== Personal life and death ==
Kang was married. His brother died by suicide.

Singer Kwon Eun-bi is Kang's cousin.

Kang died on 22 April 2025, at the age of 35.
