= Jung Hong-youn =

South Korean footballer (born 1983)

Jung Hong-Youn
Personal information
- Full name: Jung Hong-Youn (정홍연)
- Date of birth: August 18, 1983 (age 43)
- Place of birth: South Korea
- Height: 1.85 m (6 ft 1 in)
- Positions: Defender; midfielder

Team information
- Current team: Bucheon FC 1995

Senior career*
Years	Team	Apps	(Gls)
2006–2007	Jeju United	53	(1)
2008–2009	Busan I'Park	5	(0)
2010–2013	Pohang Steelers	42	(1)
2013	Chunnam Dragons	4	(0)
2014–	Bucheon FC 1995	48	(1)
- * Club domestic league appearances and goals as of 15 December 2015

Jung Hong-Youn (born August 18, 1983) is a South Korean footballer. Since 2014, he has played for Bucheon FC 1995 (formerly Busan I'Park, Jeju United, Pohang Steelers and Chunnam Dragons).
