= Song Chang-ho =

South Korean footballer (born 1986)

Song Chang-Ho
Personal information
- Full name: Song Chang-Ho
- Date of birth: 20 February 1986 (age 40)
- Place of birth: South Korea
- Height: 1.80 m (5 ft 11 in)
- Position: Midfielder

Team information
- Current team: Busan IPark
- Number: 14

Youth career
- Dong-A University

Senior career*
Years	Team	Apps	(Gls)
2008–2010	Pohang Steelers	17	(0)
2011–2013	Daegu FC	95	(7)
2014–2017	Jeonnam Dragons	42	(4)
2015–2016	→ Ansan Mugunghwa (army)	39	(3)
2018–	Busan IPark	12	(0)
- * Club domestic league appearances and goals as of 9 December 2018

- Song Chang-ho
- Hangul: 송창호
- Hanja: 宋昌鎬
- RR: Song Changho
- MR: Song Ch'angho

Song Chang-Ho (Korean: 송창호; born 20 February 1986) is a South Korea football player who currently plays for Busan IPark as a midfielder.

== Club career ==
Song started his professional career with the Pohang Steelers, as a draft player from Dong-A University. A regular squad member, he made most of his appearances for the club from the bench as a substitute. As well as intermittent appearances in the Korean domestic competitions, Song has also played in both the 2009 and 2010 editions of the FIFA Club Championship as well as the Asian Champions League.

On 29 November 2010, Song transferred to Daegu FC in a swap deal, with Lee Seul-Ki moving to Pohang.

== Club career statistics ==
As of 20 July 2011

Club performance			League		Cup		League Cup		Continental		Total	
Season	Club	League	Apps	Goals	Apps	Goals	Apps	Goals	Apps	Goals	Apps	Goals
South Korea			League		KFA Cup		League Cup		Asia		Total	
2008	Pohang Steelers	K-League	0	0	0	0	0	0	2	0	2	0
2009	Pohang Steelers	K-League	9	0	1	0	3	1	5	0	18	1
2010	Pohang Steelers	K-League	9	0	1	0	2	0	4	0	16	0
2011	Daegu FC	K-League	13	2	0	0	2	0	-		15	2
Career total			31	2	2	0	7	1	11	0	51	3
