= Mota (footballer, born 1980) =

Brazilian footballer

Personal information
- Full name: João Soares da Mota Neto
- Date of birth: 21 November 1980 (age 45)
- Place of birth: Fortaleza, Ceará, Brazil
- Height: 1.77 m (5 ft 9 1/2 in)
- Position: Striker

Senior career*
Years	Team	Apps	(Gls)
1997	Ferroviário		
1998	Ceará	1	(0)
1999–2001	Mallorca B	41	(12)
2000	Mallorca	0	(0)
2001–2002	Ceará	58	(30)
2003	Cruzeiro	49	(23)
2004	Jeonnam Dragons	21	(14)
2005	Sporting CP	5	(0)
2005–2009	Seongnam Ilhwa Chunma	75	(28)
2009	Ceará	16	(5)
2010–2011	Pohang Steelers	51	(19)
2012–2013	Ceará	87	(43)
2014	Bragantino	16	(2)
2017–2018	Ferroviário	17	(2)
Total		437	(178)
- * Club domestic league appearances and goals

João Soares da Mota Neto (born 21 November 1980), simply known as Mota, is a Brazilian former footballer who played as a striker.

== Career ==
=== Mallorca ===
After spending his early career at Campeonato Cearense clubs Ferroviário and Ceará, Mota moved to the reserve team of La Liga club Mallorca in 1999. He played for Mallorca B until 2001, and made his first-team debut as a 83rd-minute substitute in a 2–1 Copa del Rey defeat to Ourense on 12 January 2000.

Since 15 April 2001, Mota was suspended from Mallorca due to an investigation into the veracity of his Portuguese passport that he was using to work in the European Union. In the previous month, he said that he was entitled to it due to having a Portuguese great-grandmother, but the Royal Spanish Football Federation required documentary evidence, with them warning about the possibility of his suspension. He was finally banned from Spanish football for a year by Spain's Court of Sport, which found that he obtained the passport illegally in 1998. He went back to his former club Ceará after the ruling.

=== Cruzeiro, Jeonnam Dragons and Sporting CP ===
During the 2003 season, Mota played for Cruzeiro, helping them achieve the Brazilian Triple Crown. He scored a total of 24 goals at three competitions, namely the Campeonato Brasileiro Série A, the Campeonato Mineiro and the Copa do Brasil. In 2004, he played for K League club Jeonnam Dragons, and became the league's top goalscorer after scoring 14 goals during 21 appearances. His continuous successes allowed him to return to Europe. He joined Primeira Liga club Sporting CP in January 2005, and got opportunities in five league matches and one UEFA Cup match for half a year.

=== Seongnam Ilhwa Chunma ===
On 12 July 2005, Mota transferred to another K League club Seongnam Ilhwa Chunma. During the 2006 season at Seongnam, he performed an irreplaceable role in winning a K League title despite a fracture of his ankle in the middle of the season. After recovering from the four-month injury ahead of the 2006 K League Championship, he scored the winning goal in the 1–0 semi-final win over FC Seoul and both of the club's goals in a 2–1 final second-leg win over Suwon Samsung Bluewings. During the 2007 season, he led Seongnam to a first-place finish in the league's regular season and the semi-finals at the AFC Champions League, but the club failed to win a trophy at both competitions after he was sidelined by a knee injury in October. At the end of the season, he became the top goalscorer of the Champions League despite the results.

While playing in South Korea, Mota considered acquiring South Korean nationality, but the lack of his Korean language ability was an obstacle.

=== Return to Ceará ===
On 26 July 2009, Mota rejoined Ceará for the second time. He played for the club at the Campeonato Brasileiro Série B, contributing to their promotion to the Série A. He once again left for South Korea the next year, and came back to Ceará two years later.

Mota won four Cearense titles, while making 193 appearances and 89 goals at Ceará until 2013. In 2012, he was selected as the Player of the Year by Federation of Industries of the State of Ceará (FIEC), receiving the Troféu Flávio Ponte. He is regarded as one of Ceará's historic forwards.

== Honours ==
Ceará

- Campeonato Cearense: 1998, 2002, 2012, 2013

Cruzeiro

- Campeonato Brasileiro Série A: 2003
- Campeonato Mineiro: 2003
- Copa do Brasil: 2003

Seongnam Ilhwa Chunma

- K League 1: 2006
- Korean FA Cup runner-up: 2009
- Korean League Cup runner-up: 2006

Individual

- K League 1 top goalscorer: 2004
- K League 1 Best XI: 2004
- AFC Champions League top goalscorer: 2007
- K League Players' Player of the Year: 2008
- Troféu Flávio Ponte (Player of the Year by Federation of Industries of the State of Ceará): 2012
