= Lee Jin-ho =

South Korean footballer (born 1984)

Lee Jin-Ho
Personal information
- Date of birth: 3 September 1984 (age 42)
- Place of birth: Ulsan, South Korea
- Height: 1.84 m (6 ft 0 in)
- Position: Forward

Team information
- Current team: Air Force Central
- Number: 8

Youth career
- 2000: Cruzeiro
- 2000–2002: Haksung High School

Senior career*
Years	Team	Apps	(Gls)
2003–2011	Ulsan Hyundai	95	(22)
2006–2007	→ Gwangju Sangmu (Military service)	29	(4)
2010	→ Pohang Steelers (loan)	12	(4)
2012–2013	Daegu FC	49	(9)
2013	→ Jeju United (loan)	17	(3)
2014	Gwangju FC	2	(0)
2014–2018	Air Force Central	15	(1)
- * Club domestic league appearances and goals as of July 21, 2014 ‡ National team caps and goals as of July 21, 2014

- Lee Jin-ho
- Hangul: 이진호
- Hanja: 李珍浩
- RR: I Jinho
- MR: I Chinho

Lee Jin-Ho (Korean: 이진호; born 3 September 1984) is a former South Korean football player.

== Club career statistics ==
Club performance			League		Cup		League Cup		Continental		Total	
Season	Club	League	Apps	Goals	Apps	Goals	Apps	Goals	Apps	Goals	Apps	Goals
South Korea			League		KFA Cup		League Cup		Asia		Total	
2003	Ulsan Hyundai	K-League	1	0	0	0	-		-		1	0
2004	Ulsan Hyundai	K-League	3	0	4	2	0	0	-		7	2
2005	Ulsan Hyundai	K-League	19	5	2	2	6	0	-		27	7
2006	Gwangju Sangmu	K-League	9	2	1	1	2	0	-		12	3
2007	Gwangju Sangmu	K-League	20	2	0	0	4	0	-		24	2
2008	Ulsan Hyundai	K-League	26	7	3	0	8	0	-		37	7
2009	Ulsan Hyundai	K-League	19	5	0	0	4	1	1	1	24	6
2010	Ulsan Hyundai	K-League	7	2	0	0	3	0	-		10	2
2010	Pohang Steelers	K-League	12	4	1	0	0	0	1	0	14	4
2011	Ulsan Hyundai	K-League	20	3	4	0	6	2	-		30	5
2012	Daegu FC	K-League	39	9	2	1	-		-		41	10
2013	Daegu FC	K League Classic	10	0	0	0	-		-		10	0
Career total			185	39	17	6	33	3	2	1	237	44

== Honours ==
=== Club ===
Ulsan Hyundai

- K-League: 2005
