= Lee Won-jae =

South Korean footballer (born 1986)

Personal information
- Date of birth: 24 February 1986 (age 40)
- Place of birth: South Korea
- Height: 1.85 m (6 ft 1 in)
- Position: Centre-back

Youth career
- 2002–2004: Pohang Jecheol Technical High School

Senior career*
Years	Team	Apps	(Gls)
2005–2007	Pohang Steelers	6	(0)
2008	Jeonbuk Hyundai Motors	4	(0)
2009–2010	Ulsan Hyundai	17	(2)
2010–2014	Pohang Steelers	8	(0)
2013–2014	→ Ansan Police (army)	39	(1)
2015	Daegu FC	25	(1)
2016	Gyeongnam FC	13	(1)
2017–2018	Manama Club		
2018–2019	Nakhon Ratchasima	58	(2)
2020–2021	Bhayangkara	3	(0)
- * Club domestic league appearances and goals as of 13 January 2020

- Lee Won-jae
- Hangul: 이원재
- Hanja: 李源在
- RR: I Wonjae
- MR: I Wŏnjae

Lee Won-jae (Korean: 이원재; born 24 February 1986) is a South Korean football player who plays as a centre-back.

== Honours ==
=== Club ===
Pohang Steelers

- Korean FA Cup: 2012
