= Kim Da-sol =

South Korean footballer (born 1989)

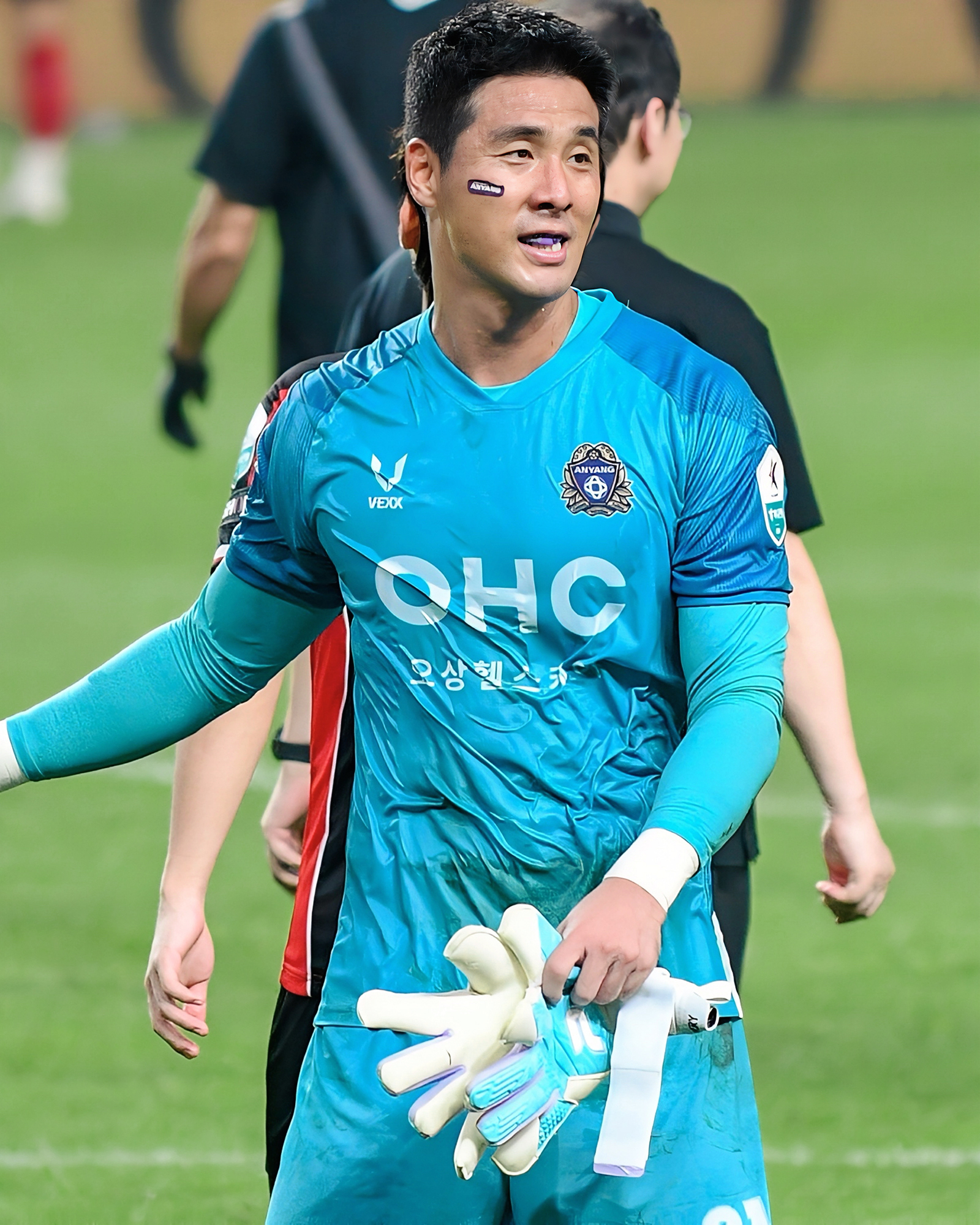
- Kim in 2025

Personal information
- Date of birth: 4 January 1989 (age 37)
- Place of birth: South Korea
- Height: 1.88 m (6 ft 2 in)
- Position: Goalkeeper

Team information
- Current team: FC Anyang
- Number: 31

Youth career
- Yonsei University

Senior career*
Years	Team	Apps	(Gls)
2010–2014	Pohang Steelers	32	(0)
2015	Daejeon Citizen	0	(0)
2016	Incheon United	3	(0)
2017–2018	Suwon FC	37	(0)
2019–2020	Suwon Samsung Bluewings	7	(0)
2021–2023	Jeonnam Dragons	58	(0)
2024–	FC Anyang	70	(0)
- * Club domestic league appearances and goals as of 5 January 2026

- Kim Da-sol
- Hangul: 김다솔
- Hanja: 金다솔
- RR: Gim Dasol
- MR: Kim Tasol

Kim Da-sol (Korean: 김다솔; born 4 January 1989) is a South Korean footballer who plays as goalkeeper for FC Anyang in the K League 1.
