= Kim Dae-ho (footballer, born 1988) =

South Korean footballer

Kim Dae-Ho
Personal information
- Full name: Kim Dae-Ho
- Date of birth: 15 May 1988 (age 38)
- Place of birth: South Korea
- Height: 1.80 m (5 ft 11 in)
- Position: Full back

Team information
- Current team: Suwon FC

Youth career
- Pohang Steelers
- Soongsil University

Senior career*
Years	Team	Apps	(Gls)
2009–2017	Pohang Steelers	102	(6)
2016	→ Ansan Mugunghwa (army)	7	(0)
2008–	Suwon FC	7	(1)
- * Club domestic league appearances and goals as of 1 January 2019

Kim Dae-Ho (Korean: 김대호; born 15 May 1988) is a South Korean footballer who plays for Suwon FC
