= Kim Won-il (footballer) =

South Korean footballer (born 1986)

Personal information
- Full name: Kim Won-il
- Date of birth: 18 October 1986 (age 40)
- Place of birth: Gimpo, South Korea
- Height: 1.85 m (6 ft 1 in)
- Position: Centre back

Youth career
- 2006–2009: Soongsil University

Senior career*
Years	Team	Apps	(Gls)
2010–2016	Pohang Steelers	156	(8)
2017–2019	Jeju United	55	(4)
2020	Gimpo Citizen	0	(0)
Total		211	(12)
- * Club domestic league appearances and goals as of 1 January 2020

- Kim Won-il
- Hangul: 김원일
- Hanja: 金源一
- RR: Gim Wonil
- MR: Kim Wŏnil

Kim Won-il (Korean: 김원일; born 18 October 1986) is a South Korean former footballer who plays as a defender.

== Personal life ==
He was educated at Gimpo Elementary School, Tongjin Middle and High Schools, and Soongsil University. Kim is a veteran of the Republic of Korea Marine Corps

== Football career ==
Kim Won-Il was a starter for Pohang Steelers in the 2013 K League 1 season. He was an integral part as in the last match of the season, he scored the league-winning goal against Ulsan Hyundai in a goal-mouth scramble in injury time.

== Career statistics ==
As of match played 2 November 2019

Appearances and goals by club, season and competition
Club	Season	League			Cup		League Cup		Continental		Other		Total	
Club	Season	Division	Apps	Goals	Apps	Goals	Apps	Goals	Apps	Goals	Apps	Goals	Apps	Goals
Pohang Steelers	2010	K League 1	13	0	1	0	0	0	2	0	—		16	0
Pohang Steelers	2011	K League 1	18	0	2	0	5	1	—		—		25	1
Pohang Steelers	2012	K League 1	32	4	3	0	—		4	0	—		39	4
Pohang Steelers	2013	K League 1	34	3	5	0	—		5	0	—		44	3
Pohang Steelers	2014	K League 1	18	1	2	0	—		4	0	—		24	1
Pohang Steelers	2015	K League 1	24	0	2	0	—		—		—		26	0
Pohang Steelers	2016	K League 1	17	0	0	0	—		4	0	—		21	0
Pohang Steelers	Total		156	8	15	0	5	1	19	0	—		195	9
Jeju United	2017	K League 1	26	3	1	0	—		7	0	—		34	3
Jeju United	2018	K League 1	20	0	2	0	—		4	0	—		26	0
Jeju United	2019	K League 1	9	1	1	0	—		—		—		10	1
Jeju United	Total		55	4	4	0	—		11	0	—		70	4
Career total			211	12	19	0	5	1	30	0	0	0	265	13
