= 2009 Pohang Steelers season =

Pohang Steelers
2009 season
- Chairman: Kim Hyun-Sik
- Manager: Sérgio Farias
- K-League: 3rd
- Korean FA Cup: Quarterfinal
- League Cup: Winner
- Champions League: Winner
- Club World Cup: 3rd
- Top goalscorer: League: Denilson (8 goals); All: Denilson (21 goals)
- Highest home attendance: 20,736 vs Busan (September 16)
- Lowest home attendance: 7,348 vs Jeju (May 9)
Home colours	Away colours

The 2009 season is the Pohang Steelers' 27th season in the K-League in South Korea. Pohang Steelers competed in the K-League, League Cup, Korean FA Cup, AFC Champions League and FIFA Club World Cup as winners of the 2009 AFC Champions League.

== Squad ==
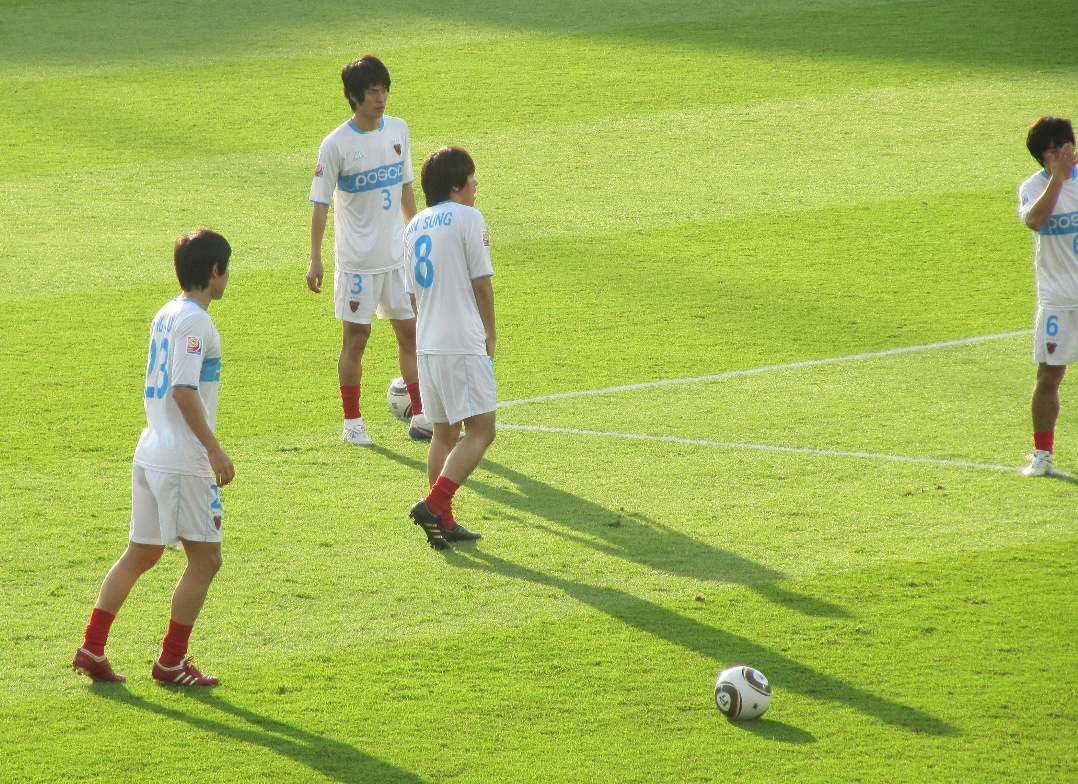
Pohang Steelers players warming up at the 2009 FIFA Club World Cup.

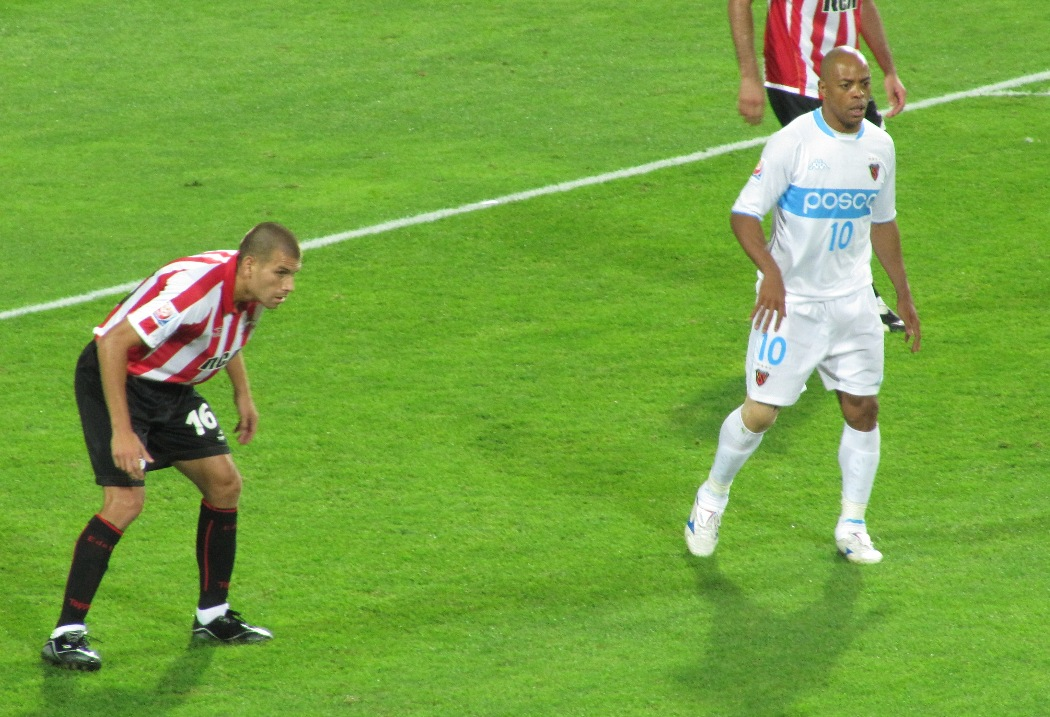
Denilson playing for the Steelers at the Club World Cup semi-final.

Note: Flags indicate national team as defined under FIFA eligibility rules; some limited exceptions apply. Players may hold more than one non-FIFA nationality.

No.	Pos.	Nation	Player
1	GK	KOR	Shin Hwa-Yong
2	MF	KOR	Choi Hyo-Jin
3	DF	KOR	Kim Gwang-Seok
4	DF	KOR	Lee Chang-Won
5	MF	KOR	Kim Tae-Su
6	MF	KOR	Kim Gi-Dong
7	MF	KOR	Kim Jae-Sung
8	MF	KOR	Hwang Jin-Sung
9	MF	KOR	Hwang Ji-Soo
10	FW	BRA	Denilson
11	MF	BRA	Vaguinho
12	MF	KOR	Park Hee-Chul
15	DF	KOR	Cho Hong-Kyu
16	MF	KOR	Kim Jung-Kyum
17	MF	KOR	Kim Ba-Woo
18	FW	KOR	Namgung Do
19	MF	KOR	Cha Ji-Ho
20	MF	KOR	Shin Hyung-Min
21	GK	KOR	Song Dong-Jin
22	FW	KOR	Noh Byung-Joon

No.	Pos.	Nation	Player
23	FW	KOR	Yoo Chang-Hyun
24		KOR	Hwang Jae-Won (captain)
25	MF	KOR	Cho Moon-Sang
26	FW	KOR	Cho Chan-Ho
27	MF	KOR	Kim Chang-Hoon
28	MF	KOR	Song Chang-Ho
30	DF	JPN	Kazunari Okayama
31	GK	KOR	Kim Jee-Hyuk
32	DF	KOR	Kim Hyung-Il
33	MF	KOR	Song Je-Heon
34	MF	KOR	Kim Bum-Joon
35	DF	KOR	Hwang Jae-Hun
36	MF	KOR	Song Soon-Bo
37	DF	KOR	Kang Dae-Ho
38	DF	KOR	Maeng Jin-Oh
39	MF	KOR	Jung Hyung-Ho
41	GK	KOR	Kim Dae-Ho
77	FW	KOR	Kim Myung-Joong
88	FW	KOR	Go Seul-Ki
99	FW	MKD	Stevica Ristić (on loan from Jeonbuk Hyundai Motors)

=== On loan ===
Note: Flags indicate national team as defined under FIFA eligibility rules; some limited exceptions apply. Players may hold more than one non-FIFA nationality.

No.	Pos.	Nation	Player
—	DF	KOR	Shin Kwang-Hoon (on loan to Jeonbuk Hyundai Motors)
—	MF	KOR	Cho Han-Bum (on loan to Daegu FC)

== K-League ==
=== Regular season ===
Date	Opponents	H / A	Result F – A	Scorers	Attendance	League position
7 March	Suwon Samsung Bluewings	A	3 – 2	Kim Tae-Su 6', Stevo 37', Denilson 85'	23,168	3rd
15 March	Gyeongnam FC	H	1 – 1	Namgung Do 41'	16,382	3rd
22 March	Daegu FC	A	2 – 2	Kim Hyung-Il 8', Kim Chang-Hoon 60'	5,342	5th
4 April	Ulsan Hyundai	H	1 – 1	Kim Gi-Dong 57'	7,815	7th
11 April	Seongnam Ilhwa Chunma	A	1 – 3	Kim Jae-Sung 11'	3,829	7th
17 April	Jeonbuk Hyundai Motors	H	1 – 1	Kim Gi-Dong 45+1'	8,183	7th
1 May	Daejeon Citizen	A	0 – 0		4,549	9th
9 May	Jeju United	H	2 – 2	Denilson 24', 67'	7,348	7th
16 May	FC Seoul	A	0 – 1		7,685	10th
24 May	Busan I'Park	H	1 – 1	Choi Hyo-Jin 26'	8,725	10th
21 June	Incheon United	A	4 – 1	Shin Hyung-Min 13', Yoo Chang-Hyun 43', own goal 45+2', Cho Chan-Ho 49'	2,315	8th
28 June	Chunnam Dragons	H	2 – 1	Yoo Chang-Hyun 6', Kim Tae-Su 38'	11,282	6th
4 July	Gangwon FC	A	2 – 1	Noh Byung-Joon 7', Denilson 90+4'	19,699	6th
11 July	Gwangju Sangmu	H	2 – 1	Kim Gi-Dong 26', Denilson 45'	11,662	5th
18 July	Gyeongnam FC	A	2 – 0	Stevo 1', Yoo Chang-Hyun 90+3'	16,852	4th
25 July	Daegu FC	H	3 – 0	Cho Chan-Ho 47', 80', Denilson 74'	10,220	4th
1 August	Ulsan Hyundai	A	2 – 2	Kim Hyung-Il 40', Yoo Chang-Hyun 76'	12,275	3rd
15 August	Seongnam Ilhwa Chunma	H	1 – 1	Noh Byung-Joon 50'	15,637	3rd
22 August	Jeonbuk Hyundai Motors	A	3 – 1	Yoo Chang-Hyun 43', Kim Tae-Su 69', Shin Hyung-Min 83'	19,546	2nd
6 September	Daejeon Citizen	H	2 – 2	Shin Hyung-Min 40', 81'	10,729	3rd
13 September	Jeju United	A	8 – 1	Kim Tae-Su 5', 80', Yoo Chang-Hyun 9', 60', Stevo 56', 68', Choi Hyo-Jin 76', Hwang Jin-Sung 90'	3,526	3rd
26 September	Busan I'Park	A	2 – 1	Stevo 26', Denilson 70'	4,699	3rd
4 October	Incheon United	H	2 – 2	Stevo 13', Denilson 25'	12,451	3rd
7 October	FC Seoul	H	3 – 2	Stevo 0:22', Kim Jung-Kyum 60', Hwang Jae-Won 90+2'	10,773	3rd
11 October	Chunnam Dragons	A	0 – 1		10,895	3rd
17 October	Gangwon FC	H	1 – 0	Noh Byung-Joon 65'	11,202	3rd
24 October	Gwangju Sangmu	A	3 – 2	Okayama 16', Kim Myung-Joong 42', own goal 70'	6,850	3rd
1 November	Suwon Samsung Bluewings	H	1 – 0	Hwang Jin-Sung 9'	12,164	2nd

Pos	Club	Pld	W	D	L	F	A	GD	Pts
1	Jeonbuk Hyundai Motors	28	17	6	5	59	33	+26	57
2	Pohang Steelers	28	14	11	3	55	33	+22	53
3	FC Seoul	28	16	5	7	47	27	+20	53

Pld = Matches played; W = Matches won; D = Matches drawn; L = Matches lost; F = Goals for; A = Goals against; GD = Goal difference; Pts = Points

=== Championship ===
Date	Round	Opponents	H / A	Result F – A	Scorers	Attendance
29 November	Semifinal	Seongnam Ilhwa Chunma	H	0 – 1		16,854

== Korean FA Cup ==
Date	Round	Opponents	H / A	Result F – A	Scorers	Attendance
13 May 2009	Round of 32	Hongcheon Idu FC	H	7 – 1	Cho Chan-Ho 12', Stevo 13', 38', 89', Noh Byung-Joon 19', 59, Own goal 28'	
1 July 2009	Round of 16	Goyang Kookmin Bank	A	4 – 0	Stevo 40', 54', Kim Gi-Dong 49', 65'	
15 July 2009	Quarterfinal	Seongnam Ilhwa Chunma	A	1 – 2	Park Hee-Chul 37'	

== League Cup ==
Date	Round	Opponents	H / A	Result F – A	Scorers	Attendance
8 July 2009	Quarterfinal 1st leg	Suwon Samsung Bluewings	H	3 – 0	Yoo Chang-Hyun 39', 47', Stevo 62'	9,763
22 July 2009	Quarterfinal 2nd leg	Suwon Samsung Bluewings	A	1 – 0	Song Chang-Ho 41'	12,449
19 August 2009	Semifinal 1st leg	FC Seoul	A	1 – 2	Noh Byung-Joon 25'	12,498
26 August 2009	Semifinal 2nd leg	FC Seoul	H	5 – 2	Noh Byung-Joon 46', 84', 90+3', Yoo Chang-Hyun 73', 75'	11,824
2 September 2009	Final 1st leg	Busan I'Park	A	1 – 1	Denilson 76'	12,124
16 September 2009	Final 2nd leg	Busan I'Park	H	5 – 1	Hwang Jin-Sung 6', 56', Denilson 14', Kim Gi-Dong 32', Kim Tae-Su 78'	20,736

== AFC Champions League ==
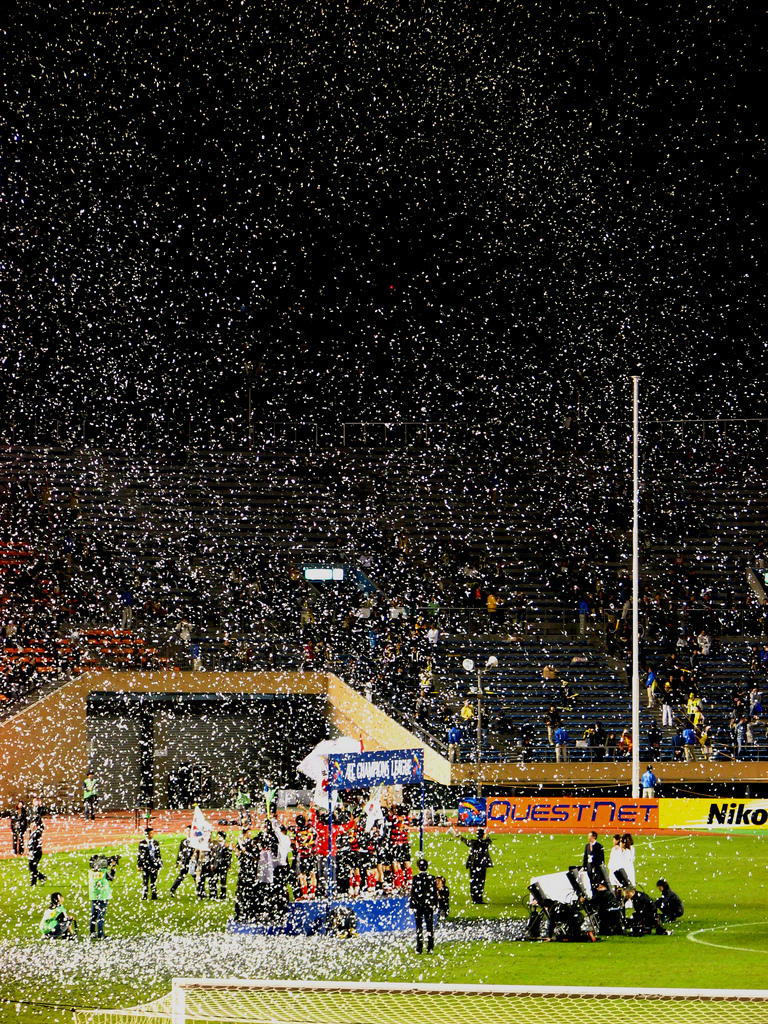
2009 AFC Champions League winner Pohang Steelers.

=== Group stage ===
Date	Opponents	H / A	Result F – A	Scorers	Attendance	Group position
11 March 2009	(Australia) Central Coast Mariners	A	0 – 0		6,870	2nd
18 March 2009	(Japan) Kawasaki Frontale	H	1 – 1	Kim Jae-Sung 12'	7,335	3rd
8 April 2009	(China) Tianjin Teda	H	1 – 0	Hwang Jin-Sung 67'	7,034	2nd
21 April 2009	(China) Tianjin Teda	A	0 – 0		19,831	2nd
5 May 2009	(Australia) Central Coast Mariners	H	3 – 2	Denilson 8', 71', 88	11,539	2nd
19 May 2009	(Japan) Kawasaki Frontale	A	2 – 0	Noh Byung-Joon 12', Denilson 72'	13,633	1st

Team	Pld	W	D	L	GF	GA	GD	Pts
(South Korea) Pohang Steelers	6	3	3	0	7	3	+4	12
(Japan) Kawasaki Frontale	6	3	1	2	10	7	+3	10
(China) Tianjin Teda	6	2	2	2	6	5	+1	8
(Australia) Central Coast Mariners	6	0	2	4	5	13	−8	2

=== Knockout stage ===
Date	Round	Opponents	H / A	Result F – A	Scorers	Attendance
24 June 2009	Round of 16	(Australia) Newcastle United Jets	H	6 – 0	Denilson 9' (pen.), Choi Hyo-Jin 15', 63', 72', Kim Jae-Sung 56', Stevo 85'	15,253
23 September 2009	Quarterfinal 1st leg	(Uzbekistan) FC Bunyodkor	A	1 – 3	Noh Byung-Joon 8'	8,350
30 September 2009	Quarterfinal 2nd leg	(Uzbekistan) FC Bunyodkor	H	4 – 1 (a.e.t.)	Kim Jae-Sung 46', Denilson 56', 77', Stevo 102'	16,252
21 October 2009	Semifinal 1st leg	(Qatar) Umm-Salal	H	2 – 0	Hwang Jae-Won 45+2', Kim Jae-Sung 79'	15,635
28 October 2009	Semifinal 2nd leg	(Qatar) Umm-Salal	A	2 – 1	Stevo 55', Noh Byung-Joon 60'	9,200
7 November 2009	Final	(Saudi Arabia) Al-Ittihad	N	2 – 1	Noh Byung-Joon 56', Kim Hyung-Il 65'	25,743

== FIFA Club World Cup ==
Date	Round	Opponents	H / A	Result F – A	Scorers	Attendance
11 December 2009	Quarterfinal	(Democratic Republic of the Congo) TP Mazembe	N	2 – 1	Denilson 50', 78'	9,627
15 December 2009	Semifinal	(Argentina) Estudiantes	N	1 – 2	Denilson 71'	22,626
19 December 2009	Third place match	(Mexico) Atlante	N	1 – 1 (4–3p)	Denilson 42'	13,814

== Statistics ==
=== Appearances and goals ===
No.	Pos.	Name	League		Playoff		FA Cup		League Cup		Asia		World		Total		
No.	Pos.	Name	Apps	Goals	Apps	Goals	Apps	Goals	Apps	Goals	Apps	Goals	Apps	Goals	Apps	Total	Goals
1	GK	(South Korea) Shin Hwa-Yong	19 (1)	0	1	0	1	0	5	0	12	0	2	0	40 (1)	41	0
2	MF	(South Korea) Choi Hyo-Jin	20 (1)	2	1	0	1	0	5	0	12	3	3	0	42 (1)	43	5
3	DF	(South Korea) Kim Gwang-Seok	15 (2)	0	0	0	1	0	1 (1)	0	8 (1)	0	0	0	25 (4)	29	0
4	DF	(South Korea) Lee Chang-Won	0	0	0	0	1	0	0	0	0	0	0	0	1 (0)	1	0
5	MF	(South Korea) Kim Tae-Su	16 (5)	5	1	0	0	0	5	1	12	0	3	0	37 (5)	42	6
6	MF	(South Korea) Kim Gi-Dong	17 (3)	3	0	0	1	2	3	1	4 (3)	0	0	0	25 (6)	31	6
7	MF	(South Korea) Kim Jae-Sung	17 (5)	1	1	0	1	0	2 (1)	0	9 (3)	4	2	0	32 (9)	41	5
8	MF	(South Korea) Hwang Jin-Sung	11 (3)	2	0 (1)	0	0	0	3	2	3 (4)	1	0 (1)	0	17 (9)	26	5
9	FW	(South Korea) Hwang Ji-Soo	16 (1)	0	0	0	3	0	1	0	0	0	0	0	20 (1)	21	0
10	FW	(Brazil) Denilson	21 (2)	8	1	0	1	0	4	2	11 (1)	7	3	4	41 (3)	44	21
11	FW	(Brazil) Brasília	3 (3)	0	0	0	0	0	0	0	3	0	0	0	6 (3)	9	0
11	FW	(Brazil) Vaguinho	0 (4)	0	0	0	0	0	0 (1)	0	0 (1)	0	0	0	0 (6)	6	0
12	MF	(South Korea) Park Hee-Chul	9 (1)	0	0	0	3	1	1	0	0 (2)	0	0 (2)	0	13 (5)	18	1
13	MF	(South Korea) Cho Han-Bum	0 (1)	0	0	0	0 (1)	0	0	0	0 (2)	0	0	0	0 (4)	4	0
14	FW	(South Korea) Lee Gwang-Jae	2 (2)	0	0	0	1	0	0	0	0	0	0	0	3 (2)	5	0
15	DF	(South Korea) Cho Hong-Kyu	4 (1)	0	0	0	1	0	2 (1)	0	1	0	0	0	8 (2)	10	0
16	MF	(South Korea) Kim Jung-Kyum	16 (1)	1	1	0	0	0	5	0	8 (2)	0	3	0	33 (3)	36	1
17	MF	(South Korea) Kim Ba-Woo	1	0	0	0	1	0	0 (1)	0	0	0	0	0	2 (1)	3	0
18	FW	(South Korea) Namgung Do	3 (2)	1	0	0	0	0	0	0	1 (2)	0	2	0	6 (4)	10	1
19	MF	(South Korea) Cha Ji-Ho	0	0	0	0	0	0	0	0	0	0	0	0	0	0	0
20	MF	(South Korea) Shin Hyung-Min	17 (4)	4	1	0	2	0	6	0	11	0	3	0	40 (4)	44	4
21	GK	(South Korea) Song Dong-Jin	0	0	0	0	0	0	0	0	0	0	1	0	1 (0)	1	0
22	FW	(South Korea) Noh Byung-Joon	8 (13)	3	1	0	1 (1)	2	3 (2)	4	7 (5)	4	3	0	23 (21)	44	13
23	FW	(South Korea) Yoo Chang-Hyun	11 (8)	7	0 (1)	0	2	0	2 (3)	4	1 (4)	0	0 (1)	0	16 (17)	33	11
24	DF	(South Korea) Hwang Jae-Won	16 (1)	1	1	0	1	0	4 (1)	0	8	1	2	0	32 (2)	34	2
25	MF	(South Korea) Cho Moon-Sang	0	0	0	0	0	0	0	0	0	0	0	0	0	0	0
26	FW	(South Korea) Cho Chan-Ho	2 (5)	3	0	0	2 (1)	1	2 (2)	0	0	0	0	0	6 (8)	14	4
27	MF	(South Korea) Kim Chang-Hoon	8	1	0	0	2	0	0	0	2	0	0	0	12 (0)	12	1
28	MF	(South Korea) Song Chang-Ho	2 (6)	0	0 (1)	0	0 (1)	0	1 (2)	1	0 (3)	0	1 (1)	0	4 (14)	18	1
29	DF	(South Korea) Lee Su-Hwan	0	0	0	0	0	0	0	0	0	0	0	0	0	0	0
30	DF	(Japan) Kazunari Okayama	4 (3)	1	0	0	0	0	1 (1)	0	0	0	1 (1)	0	6 (5)	11	1
31	GK	(South Korea) Kim Jee-Hyuk	9	0	0	0	2	0	1	0	0	0	0	0	12 (0)	12	0
32	DF	(South Korea) Kim Hyung-Il	23 (1)	2	1	0	3	0	5	0	10	1	3	0	45 (1)	46	3
33	FW	(South Korea) Song Je-Heon	1 (1)	0	0	0	0 (1)	0	0 (1)	0	0 (1)	0	0	0	1 (4)	5	0
34	MF	(South Korea) Kim Bum-Joon	0	0	0	0	0 (1)	0	0	0	0	0	0	0	0 (1)	1	0
35	DF	(South Korea) Hwang Jae-Hun	0	0	0	0	0	0	0	0	0	0	0	0	0	0	0
36	MF	(South Korea) Song Soon-Bo	0	0	0	0	0	0	0	0	0	0	0	0	0	0	0
37	DF	(South Korea) Kang Dae-Ho	0	0	0	0	0	0	0	0	0	0	0	0	0	0	0
38	DF	(South Korea) Maeng Jin-Oh	0	0	0	0	0	0	0	0	0	0	0	0	0	0	0
39	MF	(South Korea) Jung Hyung-Ho	0	0	0	0	0	0	0	0	0	0	0	0	0	0	0
41	GK	(South Korea) Kim Dae-Ho	0	0	0	0	0	0	0	0	0	0	0	0	0	0	0
77	FW	(South Korea) Kim Myung-Joong	1 (1)	1	0	0	0	0	0	0	0	0	1 (1)	0	2 (2)	4	1
88	FW	(South Korea) Go Seul-Ki	1	0	0	0	0	0	0	0	0	0	0 (2)	0	1 (2)	3	0
99	FW	(North Macedonia) Stevica Ristić	15 (4)	7	1	0	2 (1)	5	4	1	7 (2)	3	0	0	29 (7)	36	16

Statistics accurate as of match played 19 December 2009

=== Top scorers ===
Position	Nation	Number	Name	K-League	Korean FA Cup	League Cup	Champions League	FIFA Club World Cup	Total
1	(Brazil)	10	Denilson	8	0	2	7	4	21
2	(North Macedonia)	99	Stevica Ristić	7	5	1	3	0	16
3	(South Korea)	22	Noh Byung-Joon	3	2	4	4	0	13
4	(South Korea)	23	Yoo Chang-Hyun	7	0	4	0	0	11
5	(South Korea)	5	Kim Tae-Su	5	0	1	0	0	6
=	(South Korea)	6	Kim Gi-Dong	3	2	1	0	0	6
6	(South Korea)	2	Choi Hyo-Jin	2	0	0	3	0	5
=	(South Korea)	8	Hwang Jin-Sung	2	0	2	1	0	5
=	(South Korea)	7	Kim Jae-Sung	1	0	0	4	0	5
7	(South Korea)	20	Shin Hyung-Min	4	0	0	0	0	4
=	(South Korea)	26	Cho Chan-Ho	3	1	0	0	0	4
8	(South Korea)	32	Kim Hyung-Il	2	0	0	1	0	3
9	(South Korea)	24	Hwang Jae-Won	1	0	0	1	0	2
10	(South Korea)	16	Kim Jung-Kyum	1	0	0	0	0	1
=	(South Korea)	18	Namgung Do	1	0	0	0	0	1
=	(South Korea)	27	Kim Chang-Hoon	1	0	0	0	0	1
=	(Japan)	30	Kazunari Okayama	1	0	0	0	0	1
=	(South Korea)	77	Kim Myung-Joong	1	0	0	0	0	1
=	(South Korea)	12	Park Hee-Chul	0	1	0	0	0	1
=	(South Korea)	28	Song Chang-Ho	0	0	1	0	0	1
/	/	/	Own Goals	2	1	0	0	0	3
			TOTALS	55	12	16	24	4	111

=== Discipline ===
Position	Nation	Number	Name	K-League		Korean FA Cup		K-League Cup		Champions League		Club World Cup		Total	
Position	Nation	Number	Name	Booked	Sent off (straight red)	Booked	Sent off (straight red)	Booked	Sent off (straight red)	Booked	Sent off (straight red)	Booked	Sent off (straight red)	Booked	Sent off (straight red)
GK	(South Korea)	1	Shin Hwa-Yong	1	0	0	0	1	0	1	0	0	1	3	1
MF	(South Korea)	2	Choi Hyo-Jin	6	0	0	0	1	0	1	0	0	0	8	0
DF	(South Korea)	3	Kim Gwang-Seok	1	0	0	0	0	0	0	0	0	0	1	0
MF	(South Korea)	5	Kim Tae-Su	2	0	0	0	1	0	1	0	1	0	5	0
MF	(South Korea)	6	Kim Gi-Dong	1	0	0	0	0	0	0	0	0	0	1	0
MF	(South Korea)	7	Kim Jae-Sung	3	0	0	0	1	0	2	0	2	1	8	1
MF	(South Korea)	8	Hwang Jin-Sung	2	0	0	0	2	0	0	0	0	0	4	0
MF	(South Korea)	9	Hwang Ji-Soo	2	0	0	0	0	0	0	0	0	0	2	0
FW	(Brazil)	10	Denilson	6	1	0	0	0	0	1	0	1	0	8	1
FW	(Brazil)	11	Vaguinho	1	0	0	0	0	0	0	0	0	0	1	0
MF	(South Korea)	12	Park Hee-Chul	2	0	1	0	0	0	1	0	1	0	5	0
DF	(South Korea)	15	Cho Hong-Kyu	1	0	0	0	0	0	0	0	0	0	1	0
MF	(South Korea)	16	Kim Jung-Kyum	4	0	0	0	0	0	1	0	2	0	7	0
MF	(South Korea)	17	Kim Ba-Woo	0	0	0	0	1	0	0	0	0	0	1	0
MF	(South Korea)	20	Shin Hyung-Min	5	0	1	0	0	0	4	1	0	0	10	1
FW	(South Korea)	22	Noh Byung-Joon	2	0	0	0	1	0	2	0	0	0	5	0
FW	(South Korea)	23	Yoo Chang-Hyun	0	0	0	0	0	0	0	0	1	0	1	0
DF	(South Korea)	24	Hwang Jae-Won	6	0	1	0	1	0	2	0	2	1	12	1
MF	(South Korea)	27	Kim Chang-Hoon	0	0	1	0	0	0	0	0	0	0	1	0
MF	(South Korea)	28	Song Chang-Ho	0	0	0	0	1	0	2	0	0	0	3	0
DF	(Japan)	30	Kazunari Okayama	1	0	0	0	1	0	0	0	0	0	2	0
DF	(South Korea)	32	Kim Hyung-Il	6	0	1	0	3	1	2	1	1	0	13	2
FW	(South Korea)	77	Kim Myung-Joong	0	0	0	0	0	0	0	0	1	0	1	0
FW	(South Korea)	88	Go Seul-Ki	1	0	0	0	0	0	0	0	0	0	1	0
FW	(North Macedonia)	99	Stevica Ristić	4	1	1	0	1	0	0	0	0	0	6	1
			TOTALS	57	2	6	0	15	1	20	2	12	3	110	8

== Transfers ==
=== In ===
Date	Pos.	Name	From	Source
10 November 2008	FW	(South Korea) Nam Ik-Kyung	(South Korea) Gwangju Sangmu	(in Korean)
10 November 2008	MF	(South Korea) Lee Su-Hwan	(South Korea) Gwangju Sangmu	(in Korean)
20 November 2008	FW	(South Korea) Cho Chan-Ho	(South Korea) Yonsei University	(in Korean)
20 November 2008	DF	(South Korea) Hwang Jae-Hoon	(South Korea) Konkuk University	(in Korean)
20 November 2008	GK	(South Korea) Kim Dae-Ho	(South Korea) Soongsil University	(in Korean)
20 November 2008	DF	(South Korea) Kang Dae-Ho	(South Korea) Hanyang University	(in Korean)
20 November 2008	MF	(South Korea) Kim Bum-Joon	(South Korea) Kyunghee University	(in Korean)
20 November 2008	FW	(South Korea) Song Je-Heon	(South Korea) Sunmoon University	(in Korean)
20 November 2008	DF	(South Korea) Jung Hyung-Ho	(South Korea) Honam University	(in Korean)
20 November 2008	MF	(South Korea) Song Soon-Bo	(Brazil) Portuguesa Londrinense	(in Korean)
29 December 2008	MF	(South Korea) Kim Ba-Woo	(South Korea) Daejeon Citizen	(in Korean)
28 January 2009	FW	(Brazil) Brasília	(South Korea) Ulsan Hyundai	(in Korean)
28 January 2009	DF	(South Korea) Cho Hong-Kyu	(South Korea) Daegu FC	(in Korean)
28 January 2009	MF	(South Korea) Kim Tae-Su	(South Korea) Chunnam Dragons	(in Korean)
9 February 2009	MF	(South Korea) Kim Chang-Hoon	(South Korea) Jeju United	(in Korean)
February 2009	MF	(South Korea) Cho Moon-Sang	(South Korea) Suwon City	
February 2009	DF	(South Korea) Maeng Jin-Oh	(South Korea) Honam University	
14 July 2009	DF	(Japan) Kazunari Okayama	(Japan) Vegalta Sendai	
22 July 2009	FW	(South Korea) Cha Ji-Ho	(Japan) Roasso Kumamoto	(in Korean)
27 July 2009	FW	(Brazil) Vaguinho	(Brazil) Joinville	(in Korean)
22 October 2009	FW	(South Korea) Kim Myung-Joong	(South Korea) Gwangju Sangmu	(in Korean)
22 October 2009	FW	(South Korea) Go Seul-Ki	(South Korea) Gwangju Sangmu	(in Korean)

=== Out ===
Date	Pos.	Name	To	Source
10 December 2008	DF	(South Korea) Kim Soo-Yeon	(South Korea) Gwangju Sangmu	(in Korean)
10 December 2008	DF	(South Korea) Jang Hyun-Kyu	(South Korea) Gwangju Sangmu	(in Korean)
January 2009	MF	(South Korea) Lee Tae-Young	(China) Qingdao Jonoon F.C.	
6 January 2009	DF	(South Korea) Cho Sung-Hwan	(Japan) Consadole Sapporo	(in Korean)
12 January 2009	MF	(South Korea) Park Won-Jae	(Japan) Omiya Ardija	(in Korean)
26 March 2009	FW	(South Korea) Nam Ik-Kyung	(Finland) JJK	(in Finnish)
13 July 2009	FW	(Brazil) Brasília	(South Korea) Jeonbuk Hyundai Motors	(in Korean)
21 July 2009	MF	(South Korea) Lee Gwang-Jae	(South Korea) Jeonbuk Hyundai Motors	(in Korean)
July 2009	MF	(South Korea) Lee Su-Hwan	(South Korea) Cheonan City	
1 November 2009	DF	(South Korea) Lee Chang-Won	Retired	
30 November 2009	GK	(South Korea) Kim Jee-Hyuk	(South Korea) Gwangju Sangmu	(in Korean)

=== Loan out ===
Date	Pos.	Name	Moving To	Source
29 July 2009	DF	(South Korea) Cho Han-Bum	(South Korea) Daegu FC	(in Korean)

== Honours ==
=== Club ===
- AFC Champions League Winners, Fair Play Award
- K-League Cup Winners

=== Individual ===
- K-League Best XI: (South Korea) Shin Hwa-Yong, (South Korea) Kim Hyung-Il, (South Korea) Hwang Jae-Won, (South Korea) Choi Hyo-Jin, (Brazil) Denilson
- K-League Cup Top Scorer: (South Korea) Yoo Chang-Hyun (4 goals)
- K-League Cup Top Assistor: (South Korea) Cho Chan-Ho (3 assists)
- Korean FA Cup Top Scorer: (North Macedonia) Stevo (5 goals)
- AFC Champions League MVP: (South Korea) No Byung-Jun
- FIFA Club World Cup Top Scorer: (Brazil) Denilson (4 goals)
