= 2008 Pohang Steelers season =

Pohang Steelers
2008 season
- Chairman: Kim Hyun-Sik
- Manager: Sérgio Farias
- K-League: 5th
- Korean FA Cup: Winner
- League Cup: Semifinal
- Champions League: Group Stage
- Top goalscorer: League: Stevo; Denilson; Namgung Do (All 6 goals); All: Denilson (8 goals)
- Highest home attendance: 17,288 vs Suwon (26 October)
- Lowest home attendance: 4,571 vs Bình Dương (21 May)
- Average home league attendance: 10,751
Home colours	Away colours

The 2008 season is Pohang Steelers' 26th season in the K-League in South Korea. Pohang Steelers competed in K-League, League Cup, Korean FA Cup and AFC Champions League.

== Squad ==
Note: Flags indicate national team as defined under FIFA eligibility rules; some limited exceptions apply. Players may hold more than one non-FIFA nationality.

No.	Pos.	Nation	Player
1	GK	KOR	Shin Hwa-Yong
2	MF	KOR	Choi Hyo-Jin
3	DF	KOR	Kim Gwang-Seok
4	DF	KOR	Lee Chang-Won
6	MF	KOR	Kim Gi-Dong
7	MF	KOR	Kim Jae-Sung
8	MF	KOR	Hwang Jin-Sung
9	MF	KOR	Hwang Ji-Soo
10	FW	BRA	Denilson
11	MF	KOR	Choi Jong-Bum
12	MF	KOR	Park Hee-Chul
14	DF	KOR	Kim Hyung-Il
16	MF	KOR	Kim Jung-Kyum
17	MF	KOR	Lee Gwang-Jae
18	FW	KOR	Namgung Do
19	MF	KOR	Park Won-Jae

No.	Pos.	Nation	Player
21	GK	KOR	Song Dong-Jin
22	DF	KOR	Jang Hyun-Kyu
23	FW	KOR	Yoo Chang-Hyun
24	DF	KOR	Hwang Jae-Won
25	MF	KOR	Shin Hyung-Min
26	DF	KOR	Kim Soo-Yeon
27	MF	KOR	Cho Han-Bum
28	MF	KOR	Song Chang-Ho
29	MF	KOR	Lee Tae-Young
30	MF	KOR	Lee Sung-Jae
31	GK	KOR	Kim Jee-Hyuk
33	MF	KOR	Noh Byung-Joon
35	MF	KOR	Kim Yoon-Sik
36	MF	KOR	Kim Ji-min
37	DF	KOR	Cho Sung-Hwan
99	FW	MKD	Stevica Ristić (on loan from Jeonbuk Hyundai)

== K-League ==
=== Regular season ===
Date	Opponents	H / A	Result F – A	Scorers	Attendance	League position
8 March	Chunnam Dragons	H	2 – 1	Kim Gwang-Seok 26', Namgung Do 90+3'	15,121	1st
15 March	Ulsan Hyundai Horang-i	A	0 – 3		22,676	8th
29 March	Incheon United	H	1 – 2	Denilson 90+1'	8,862	10th
6 April	Jeonbuk Hyundai Motors	A	1 – 1	Kim Gi-Dong 73'	9,823	10th
13 April	Daejeon Citizen	H	0 – 0		9,641	9th
19 April	Daegu FC	H	3 – 0	Namgung Do 16', Hwang Jae-Won 30', Noh Byung-Joon 70'	7,517	7th
26 April	Busan I'Park	A	2 – 1	Shin Hyung-Min 80', Park Won-Jae 90'	7,775	4th
3 May	Seongnam Ilhwa Chunma	A	3 – 2	Park Won-Jae 21', Kim Jae-Sung 25', Own goal 71'	7,282	4th
11 May	Gwangju Sangmu Phoenix	H	3 – 1	Denilson 10', 51', Choi Hyo-Jin 89'	10,511	4th
17 May	Gyeongnam FC	H	3 – 1	Namgung Do 34', Denilson 63', 65'	14,326	2nd
24 May	Suwon Samsung Bluewings	A	0 – 1		38,239	3rd
28 June	Jeju United	H	0 – 1		5,805	4th
5 July	FC Seoul	A	1 – 4	Hwang Jin-Sung 52'	18,233	5th
12 July	Chunnam Dragons	A	0 – 2		10,803	6th
19 July	Ulsan Hyundai Horang-i	H	3 – 1	Denilson 14, Stevo 29', Jang Hyun-Kyu 54'	11,374	4th
23 August	Incheon United	A	1 – 2	Namgung Do 89'	5,872	5th
30 August	Jeonbuk Hyundai Motors	H	1 – 1	Stevo 14'	12,151	6th
13 September	Daegu FC	A	4 – 1	Kim Jae-Sung 4', Kim Gi-Dong 48', Park Won-Jae 75', Namgung Do 90'	7,285	6th
20 September	Busan I'Park	H	3 – 2	Hwang Jin-Sung 3', Choi Hyo-Jin 44', Stevo 58'	13,671	5th
27 September	Seongnam Ilhwa Chunma	H	2 – 1	Noh Byung-Joon 77', Shin Hyung-Min 83'	13,984	5th
5 October	Gwangju Sangmu Phoenix	A	1 – 1	Park Won-Jae 57'	16,820	5th
18 October	Gyeongnam FC	A	4 – 3	Namgung Do 31', Stevo 75', 76', Noh Byung-Joon 87'	17,293	4th
26 October	Suwon Samsung Bluewings	H	0 – 0		17,288	5th
29 October	Daejeon Citizen	A	3 – 0	Kim Gi-Dong 42', Shin Hyung-Min 65', Cho Sung-Hwan 77'	15,824	5th
2 November	Jeju United	A	1 – 0	Noh Byung-Joon 65'	4,416	5th
9 November	FC Seoul	H	1 – 2	Stevo 90'	13,289	5th

Pos	Club	Pld	W	D	L	F	A	GD	Pts
4	Ulsan Hyundai Horang-i	26	14	7	5	39	26	+13	49
5	Pohang Steelers	26	13	5	8	43	34	+9	44
6	Jeonbuk Hyundai Motors	26	11	4	11	39	37	+2	37

Pld = Matches played; W = Matches won; D = Matches drawn; L = Matches lost; F = Goals for; A = Goals against; GD = Goal difference; Pts = Points

=== Play-off ===
Date	Round	Opponents	H / A	Result F – A	Scorers	Attendance
20 August	First Round	Ulsan Hyundai Horang-i	A	0 – 0 (2–4p)		9,480

== Korean FA Cup ==
Date	Round	Opponents	H / A	Result F – A	Scorers	Attendance
20 August	Round of 16	Chunnam Dragons	A	1 – 0	Noh Byung-Joon 89'	
5 November	Quarterfinal	Seongnam Ilhwa Chunma	H	1 – 1 (8–7p)	Namgung Do 82'	
18 December	Semifinal	Daegu FC	N	2 – 0	Hwang Jae-Won 42', Lee Gwang-Jae 82'	
21 December	Final	Gyeongnam FC	N	2 – 0	Hwang Jin-Sung 3', Kim Jae-Sung 78'	

== League Cup ==
Date	Round	Opponents	H / A	Result F – A	Scorers	Attendance
1 October	Quarterfinal	Seongnam Ilhwa Chunma	A	1 – 0	Noh Byung-Joon 29'	7,825
8 October	Semifinal	Suwon Samsung Bluewings	A	0 – 0 (2–3p)		16,321

== AFC Champions League ==
=== Group stage ===
Date	Opponents	H / A	Result F – A	Scorers	Attendance	Group position
12 March	Adelaide United	H	0 – 2		8,436	4th
19 March	Bình Dương	A	4 – 1	Denilson 49' (pen.), 58' (pen.), Kim Jae-Sung 56', Choi Hyo-Jin 64'	12,000	3rd
9 April	Changchun Yatai	A	0 – 1		18,000	3rd
23 April	Changchun Yatai	H	2 – 2	Hwang Jae-Won 64', Hwang Jin-Sung 90'	5,468	3rd
7 May	Adelaide United	A	0 – 1		11,805	3rd
21 May	Bình Dương	H	0 – 0		4,571	3rd

Team	Pld	W	D	L	GF	GA	GD	Pts
(Australia) Adelaide United	6	4	2	0	9	2	7	14
(China) Changchun Yatai	6	3	3	0	10	3	7	12
(South Korea) Pohang Steelers	6	1	2	3	6	7	−1	5
(Vietnam) Bình Dương	6	0	1	5	4	17	−13	1

== Squad statistics ==
No.	Pos.	Name	League		FA Cup		League Cup		Asia		Total			Discipline	
No.	Pos.	Name	Apps	Goals	Apps	Goals	Apps	Goals	Apps	Goals	Apps	Total	Goals	Yellow card	Red card
1	GK	(South Korea) Shin Hwa-Yong	8	0	1	0	0 (1)	0	6	0	15 (1)	16	0	0	0
2	MF	(South Korea) Choi Hyo-Jin	25	2	4	0	1	0	4	1	34 (0)	34	3	5	0
3	DF	(South Korea) Kim Gwang-Seok	18 (2)	1	1	0	0 (1)	0	5	0	24 (3)	27	1	6	0
4	DF	(South Korea) Lee Chang-Won	5	0	0	0	0	0	4	0	9 (0)	9	0	2	0
6	MF	(South Korea) Kim Gi-Dong	17 (1)	3	2	0	0 (1)	0	3 (1)	0	22 (3)	25	3	2	1
7	MF	(South Korea) Kim Jae-Sung	13 (11)	2	2 (1)	1	2	0	3 (1)	1	20 (13)	33	4	9	0
8	MF	(South Korea) Hwang Jin-Sung	16 (6)	2	2 (1)	1	1 (1)	0	2 (1)	1	21 (9)	30	4	4	0
9	MF	(South Korea) Hwang Ji-Soo	23	0	3	0	2	0	4	0	32 (0)	32	0	4	0
10	FW	(Brazil) Denilson	19	6	2	0	0	0	4	2	25 (0)	25	8	6	0
11	MF	(South Korea) Choi Jong-Bum	0	0	0	0	0	0	2	0	2 (0)	2	0	0	0
12	MF	(South Korea) Park Yoon-Hwa	0	0	0	0	0	0	0	0	0	0	0	0	0
12	MF	(South Korea) Park Hee-Chul	3 (1)	0	0 (1)	0	1 (1)	0	0	0	4 (3)	7	0	1	0
13	MF	(South Korea) Shin Kwang-Hoon	0 (4)	0	0	0	0	0	2	0	2 (4)	6	0	1	0
14	FW	(South Korea) Kwon Jip	0	0	0	0	0	0	2	0	2 (0)	2	0	0	0
14	DF	(South Korea) Kim Hyung-Il	3	0	1	0	0	0	0	0	4 (0)	4	0	2	0
15	FW	(Brazil) Clodoaldo	2	0	0	0	0	0	1 (1)	0	3 (1)	4	0	1	0
16	MF	(South Korea) Park Won-Jae	23 (2)	4	3 (1)	0	1	0	3	0	30 (3)	33	4	6	2
16	MF	(South Korea) Kim Jung-Kyum	2 (1)	0	1	0	0	0	0	0	3 (1)	4	0	0	0
17	FW	(South Korea) Lee Gwang-Jae	2 (6)	0	0 (2)	1	0 (1)	0	2 (2)	0	4 (11)	15	1	2	0
18	FW	(South Korea) Namgung Do	11 (13)	6	1 (2)	1	0 (1)	0	3	0	15 (16)	31	7	4	0
19	FW	(South Korea) Lee Sung-Jae	0 (1)	0	0	0	0	0	0 (2)	0	0 (3)	3	0	1	0
20	MF	(Brazil) Fabiano Gadelha	0	0	0	0	0	0	1 (5)	0	1 (5)	6	0	0	0
21	GK	(South Korea) Song Dong-Jin	0	0	0	0	0	0	0	0	0	0	0	0	0
22	DF	(South Korea) Jang Hyun-Kyu	19 (1)	1	4	0	2	0	2	0	27 (1)	28	1	3	0
23	FW	(South Korea) Yoo Chang-Hyun	0	0	0	0	0	0	1 (1)	0	1 (1)	2	0	0	0
24	DF	(South Korea) Hwang Jae-Won	17	1	2	1	2	0	2	1	23 (0)	23	3	4	1
25	MF	(South Korea) Shin Hyung-Min	15 (2)	3	2 (1)	0	2	0	2 (2)	0	21 (5)	26	3	5	0
26	DF	(South Korea) Kim Soo-Yeon	2	0	0	0	0	0	1	0	3 (0)	3	0	1	0
27	MF	(South Korea) Cho Han-Bum	0 (1)	0	0	0	1	0	1 (1)	0	2 (2)	4	0	1	0
28	MF	(South Korea) Song Chang-Ho	0	0	0	0	0	0	2	0	2 (0)	2	0	0	0
29	DF	(South Korea) Lee Tae-Young	0	0	0	0	0	0	0	0	0	0	0	0	0
31	GK	(South Korea) Kim Jee-Hyuk	19	0	3	0	2	0	0	0	24 (0)	24	0	1	0
32	DF	(South Korea) Lee Seung-Yeul	0	0	0	0	0	0	0	0	0	0	0	0	0
33	DF	(South Korea) Noh Byung-Joon	7 (12)	4	1 (3)	1	1 (1)	1	0	0	9 (16)	25	6	1	0
35	MF	(South Korea) Kim Yoon-Sik	0 (2)	0	1	0	0	0	0	0	1 (2)	3	0	0	0
36	MF	(South Korea) Kim Ji-min	0 (1)	0	0	0	0	0	0	0	0 (1)	1	0	0	0
37	DF	(South Korea) Cho Sung-Hwan	16	1	4	0	2	0	4	0	26 (0)	26	1	9	1
99	FW	(North Macedonia) Stevica Ristić (loan in)	9 (3)	6	3	0	2	0	0	0	14 (3)	17	6	1	0

== Transfers ==
=== In ===
Date	Pos.	Name	From	Source
15 November 2007	MF	(South Korea) Shin Hyung-Min	(South Korea) Hongik University	(in Korean)
15 November 2007	FW	(South Korea) Yoo Chang-Hyun	(South Korea) Daegu University	(in Korean)
15 November 2007	MF	(South Korea) Cho Han-Bum	(South Korea) Chung-Ang University	(in Korean)
15 November 2007	MF	(South Korea) Song Chang-Ho	(South Korea) Dong-A University	(in Korean)
3 December 2007	FW	(Brazil) Denilson	(South Korea) Daejeon Citizen	(in Korean)
10 December 2007	MF	(South Korea) Kwon Jip	(South Korea) Jeonbuk Hyundai Motors	(in Korean)
10 December 2007	MF	(South Korea) Kim Jung-Kyum	(South Korea) Jeonbuk Hyundai Motors	(in Korean)
11 December 2007	FW	(South Korea) Namgung Do	(South Korea) Chunnam Dragons	(in Korean)
18 December 2007	FW	(Brazil) Fabiano	(Brazil) Marília Atlético Clube	(in Korean)
28 December 2007	DF	(South Korea) Jang Hyun-Kyu	(South Korea) Daejeon Citizen	(in Korean)
7 January 2008	MF	(South Korea) Kim Jae-Sung	(South Korea) Jeju United	(in Korean)
30 January 2008	MF	(South Korea) Park Yoon-Hwa	(South Korea) Daegu FC	(in Korean)
29 February 2008	GK	(South Korea) Kim Jee-Hyuk	(South Korea) Ulsan Hyundai Horang-i	(in Korean)
7 March 2008	FW	(South Korea) Noh Byung-Joon	Free Agent	
11 July 2008	MF	(South Korea) Park Hee-Chul	(South Korea) Gyeongnam FC	(in Korean)
29 July 2008	DF	(South Korea) Kim Hyung-Il	(South Korea) Daejeon Citizen	(in Korean)

Loan in

Date	Pos.	Name	Moving From	End	Source
22 January 2008	FW	(Brazil) Aldo	(Brazil) Corinthians	December 2009	(in Korean)
4 July 2008	FW	(North Macedonia) Stevica Ristić	(South Korea) Jeonbuk Hyundai Motors	December 2010	(in Korean)

=== Out ===
Date	Pos.	Name	To	Source
26 November 2007	MF	(South Korea) Kim Myung-Joong	(South Korea) Gwangju Sangmu Phoenix	(in Korean)
26 November 2007	MF	(South Korea) Go Seul-Ki	(South Korea) Gwangju Sangmu Phoenix	(in Korean)
3 December 2007	FW	(Brazil) Schwenck	(Brazil) Goiás Esporte Clube	(in Korean)
10 December 2007	MF	(South Korea) Kim Sung-Keun	(South Korea) Jeonbuk Hyundai Motors	(in Korean)
10 December 2007	MF	(South Korea) Choi Tae-Uk	(South Korea) Jeonbuk Hyundai Motors	(in Korean)
11 December 2007	FW	(South Korea) Ko Ki-Gu	(South Korea) Chunnam Dragons	(in Korean)
7 January 2008	MF	(South Korea) Oh Seung-Bum	(South Korea) Jeju United	(in Korean)
9 January 2008	MF	(Brazil) Tavares	(Brazil) Sport Club Internacional	(in Korean)
14 January 2008	MF	(South Korea) Ohn Byung-Hoon	(South Korea) Jeonbuk Hyundai Motors	(in Korean)
14 January 2008	DF	(South Korea) Lee Won-Jae	(South Korea) Jeonbuk Hyundai Motors	(in Korean)
22 January 2008	FW	(Brazil) Jonhes	Release	(in Korean)
18 February 2008	GK	(South Korea) Cha Chul-Ho	(South Korea) Ulsan Mipo Dockyard	(in Korean)
29 February 2008	GK	(South Korea) Jung Sung-Ryong	(South Korea) Seongnam Ilhwa Chunma	(in Korean)
February 2008	GK	(South Korea) Kwon Jung-Hyuk	(South Korea) FC Seoul	
June 2008	FW	(Brazil) Aldo	(Brazil) Náutico	
June 2008	FW	(Brazil) Fabiano	(Brazil) Náutico	
11 July 2008	MF	(South Korea) Park Yoon-Hwa	(South Korea) Gyeongnam FC	(in Korean)
29 July 2008	MF	(South Korea) Kwon Jip	(South Korea) Daejeon Citizen	(in Korean)
	GK	(South Korea) Kim Hyun-Bum	?	

Loan out

Date	Pos.	Name	Moving To	End	Source
4 July 2008	MF	(South Korea) Shin Kwang-Hoon	(South Korea) Jeonbuk Hyundai Motors	December 2010	(in Korean)
