= 2009 AFC Champions League final =

- Event: 2009 AFC Champions League
Al-Ittihad	Pohang Steelers
(Saudi Arabia)	(South Korea)
1	2
- Date: 7 November 2009
- Venue: National Stadium, Tokyo
- AFC Man of the Match: No Byung-jun (Pohang Steelers)
- Fans' Man of the Match: Denilson (Pohang Steelers)
- Referee: Matthew Breeze (Australia)
- Attendance: 25,743
- Weather: Clear

The 2009 AFC Champions League final was a football match which was played on Saturday, 7 November 2009. It was the 28th final of the AFC Champions League, Asia's premier club football tournament, and the first single match final since 2002 when the competition was known as the Asian Club Championship. The match was played at the National Stadium in Tokyo between Al-Ittihad of Saudi Arabia and Pohang Steelers of South Korea. The winners Pohang Steelers were also entered the quarter-finals of the 2009 FIFA Club World Cup.

Pohang Steelers defeated Al-Ittihad 2–1, winning its third title to become the most successful club in Asian football.

== Qualified teams ==
Team	Previous finals appearances (bold indicates winners)
(Saudi Arabia) Al-Ittihad	**2004**, **2005**
(South Korea) Pohang Steelers	**1997**, **1998**

== Road to Tokyo ==
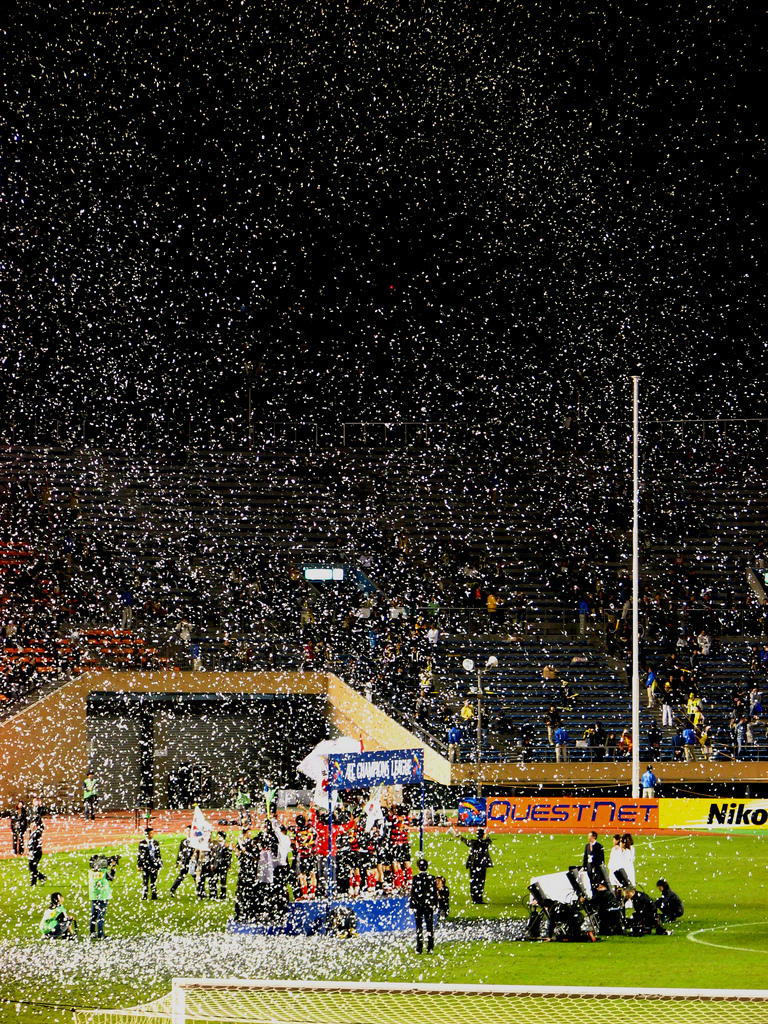
Pohang Steelers won the 2009 AFC Champions League.

Al-Ittihad			Round	Pohang Steelers		
Main article: 2009 AFC Champions League group stage: Group C: Team / Pld / W / D / L / GF / GA / GD / Pts; (Saudi Arabia) **Al-Ittihad** / 6 / 3 / 3 / 0 / 14 / 4 / +10 / **12**; (Qatar) Umm-Salal / 6 / 2 / 2 / 2 / 6 / 13 / −7 / **8**; (United Arab Emirates) Al-Jazira / 6 / 0 / 5 / 1 / 6 / 7 / −1 / **5**; (Iran) Esteghlal / 6 / 0 / 4 / 2 / 6 / 8 / −2 / **4**			Group stage	Main article: 2009 AFC Champions League group stage: Group H: Team / Pld / W / D / L / GF / GA / GD / Pts; (South Korea) **Pohang Steelers** / 6 / 3 / 3 / 0 / 7 / 3 / +4 / **12**; (Japan) Kawasaki Frontale / 6 / 3 / 1 / 2 / 10 / 7 / +3 / **10**; (China) Tianjin Teda / 6 / 2 / 2 / 2 / 6 / 5 / +1 / **8**; (Australia) C.C. Mariners / 6 / 0 / 2 / 4 / 5 / 13 / −8 / **2**		
Opponent	Result	Legs	Knockout stage	Opponent	Result	Legs
(Saudi Arabia) Al-Shabab	2–1		Round of 16	(Australia) Newcastle United Jets	6–0	
(Uzbekistan) Pakhtakor Tashkent	5–1	4–0 home; 1–1 away	Quarter-finals	(Uzbekistan) Bunyodkor	5–4	4–1 home; 1–3 away
(Japan) Nagoya Grampus	8–3	6–2 home; 2–1 away	Semi-finals	(Qatar) Umm-Salal	4–1	2–0 home; 2–1 away

== Match details ==
7 November 2009
19:00 (JST)

Al-Ittihad (Saudi Arabia)	1 – 2	(South Korea) Pohang Steelers
Mohammed Noor 74'	Report	No Byung-jun 57'; Kim Hyung-il 66'

National Olympic Stadium, Tokyo
Attendance: 25,743
Referee: Matthew Breeze (Australia)

**Al-Ittihad**	**Pohang Steelers**

GK	1	(Saudi Arabia) Mabrouk Zaid
RB	6	(Saudi Arabia) Obaid Al-Shamrani		(substituted off) 64'
CB	4	(Saudi Arabia) Redha Tukar
CB	21	(Saudi Arabia) Hamad Al-Montashari
LB	19	(Saudi Arabia) Saleh Al-Saqri
DM	14	(Saudi Arabia) Saud Khariri
RM	11	(Morocco) Hicham Aboucherouane
CM	18	(Saudi Arabia) Mohammed Noor (c)	(yellow card) 50'
CM	12	(Oman) Ahmed Hadid
LM	8	(Saudi Arabia) Manaf Abushgeer
CF	27	(Tunisia) Amine Chermiti
Substitutes:
GK	22	(Saudi Arabia) Tisir Al-Antaif
DF	5	(Saudi Arabia) Mohammed Salem
DF	33	(Saudi Arabia) Osama Al-Muwallad
MF	16	(Saudi Arabia) Meshal Al-Said
MF	30	(Saudi Arabia) Sultan Al-Nemri
FW	15	(Argentina) Luciano Leguizamón		(substituted on) 64'
FW	29	(Saudi Arabia) Talal Al-Meshal
Manager:
(Argentina) Gabriel Calderón

GK	1	(South Korea) Shin Hwa-yong
RB	2	(South Korea) Choi Hyo-jin
CB	24	(South Korea) Hwang Jae-won (c)
CB	32	(South Korea) Kim Hyung-il
LB	16	(South Korea) Kim Jung-kyum		(substituted off) 75'
CM	20	(South Korea) Shin Hyung-min	(yellow card) 39'
CM	5	(South Korea) Kim Tae-su
RW	10	(Brazil) Denílson		(substituted off) 90+3'
AM	7	(South Korea) Kim Jae-sung	(yellow card) 29'
LW	22	(South Korea) No Byung-jun	(yellow card) 90+1'
CF	9	(North Macedonia) Stevica Ristić		(substituted off) 71'
Substitutes:
GK	41	(South Korea) Kim Jee-hyuk
DF	4	(Japan) Kazunari Okayama
MF	8	(South Korea) Hwang Jin-sung
MF	12	(South Korea) Park Hee-chul		(substituted on) 75'
MF	14	(South Korea) Song Chang-ho	(yellow card) 90+1'	(substituted on) 71'
FW	18	(South Korea) Namkung Do		(substituted on) 90+3'
FW	23	(South Korea) Yoo Chang-hyun
Manager:
(Brazil) Sérgio Farias

AFC Man of the Match:
(South Korea) No Byung-jun

Assistant referees:
(Australia) Matthew Cream
(Australia) Benjamin Wilson
Fourth official:
(Australia) Peter Green

== See also ==
- 2009 AFC Champions League
- 2009 FIFA Club World Cup
