= 2009 FIFA Club World Cup =

FIFA Club World Cup UAE 2009 presented by Toyota كأس العالم للأندية لكرة القدم الإمارات العربية المتحدة 2009

Tournament details
- Host country: United Arab Emirates
- Dates: 9–19 December
- Teams: 7 (from 6 confederations)
- Venues: 2 (in 1 host city)

Final positions
- Champions: (Spain) Barcelona (1st title)
- Runners-up: (Argentina) Estudiantes
- Third place: (South Korea) Pohang Steelers
- Fourth place: (Mexico) Atlante

Tournament statistics
- Matches played: 8
- Goals scored: 25 (3.13 per match)
- Attendance: 156,350 (19,544 per match)
- Top scorer(s): Denílson (Pohang Steelers); 4 goals
- Best player: Lionel Messi (Barcelona)
- Fair play award: (Mexico) Atlante

The 2009 FIFA Club World Cup (officially known as the FIFA Club World Cup UAE 2009 presented by Toyota for sponsorship reasons) was a football tournament played from 9 to 19 December 2009. It was the sixth FIFA Club World Cup and was played in United Arab Emirates.

Defending champions Manchester United did not qualify as they lost the 2009 UEFA Champions League Final to Barcelona, who went on to win the Club World Cup for the first time. After coming from behind to beat Mexican side Atlante in the semi-finals, they did the same against the South American entrants, Estudiantes, in the final, winning 2–1 after extra time. Mauro Boselli put Estudiantes ahead in the 37th minute, but Pedro equalised with a minute left in normal time before Lionel Messi scored the winning goal five minutes into the second half of extra time.

This win made Barcelona the first Spanish side to win the Club World Cup, and it also meant that they had won six competitions in the 2009 calendar year, beating Liverpool's European record of five trophies won in 2001.

== Host bids ==
On 13 August 2007, FIFA announced that an open tender for the bidding process for the 2009 tournament would be opened in November 2007. The FIFA Executive Committee appointed the United Arab Emirates as hosts for the 2009 and 2010 tournaments on 27 May 2008 during their meeting in Sydney, Australia. Australia, Japan and Portugal also placed bids to host the tournament, but Portugal later withdrew from the process.

== Qualified teams ==
Location of teams of the 2009 FIFA Club World Cup

Team	Confederation	Qualification	Participation
Entering in the semi-finals
(Spain) Barcelona	UEFA	Winners of the 2008–09 UEFA Champions League	2nd (Previous: 2006)
(Argentina) Estudiantes	CONMEBOL	Winners of the 2009 Copa Libertadores	Debut
Entering in the quarter-finals
(Mexico) Atlante	CONCACAF	Winners of the 2008–09 CONCACAF Champions League	Debut
(South Korea) Pohang Steelers	AFC	Winners of the 2009 AFC Champions League	Debut
(Democratic Republic of the Congo) TP Mazembe	CAF	Winners of the 2009 CAF Champions League	Debut
Entering in the play-off for quarter-finals
(United Arab Emirates) Al-Ahli	AFC (host)	Winners of the 2008–09 UAE Pro-League	Debut
(New Zealand) Auckland City	OFC	Winners of the 2008–09 OFC Champions League	2nd (Previous: 2006)

== Venues ==
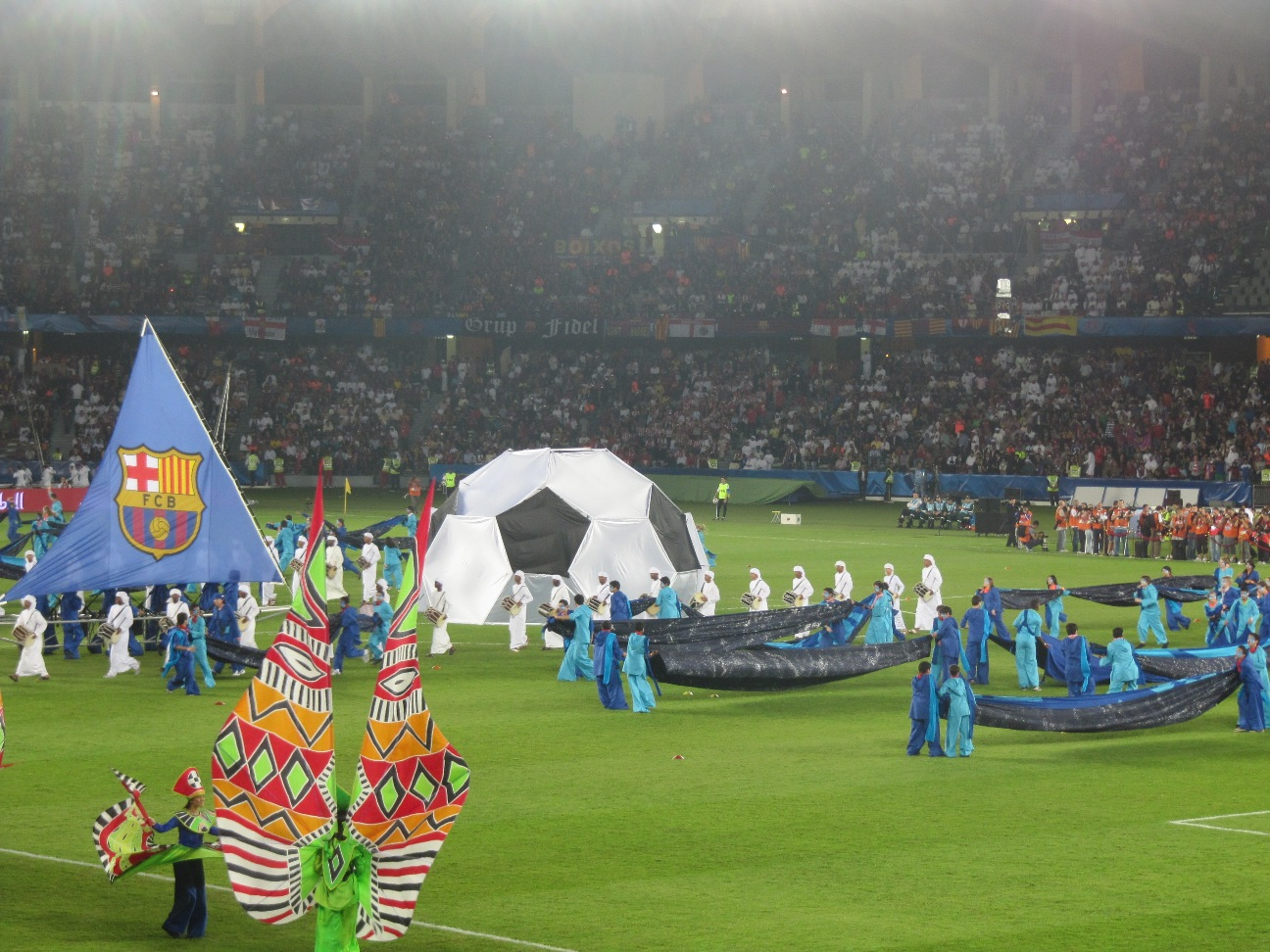
Closing ceremony of the tournament

All of the matches at the tournament were played in Abu Dhabi, with three matches at the Mohammed bin Zayed Stadium and five at the Zayed Sports City Stadium, including the final and the play-offs for third and fifth place.

Abu Dhabi
Mohammed bin Zayed Stadium	Zayed Sports City Stadium
24°27′09.95″N 54°23′31.27″E	24°24′57.92″N 54°27′12.93″E
Capacity: 42,056	Capacity: 50,000
Location of the host city of the 2009 FIFA Club World Cup.

== Match ball ==
The Adidas Jabulani, the official match ball of the 2010 FIFA World Cup, served as the match ball of the 2009 FIFA Club World Cup.

== Match officials ==
Confederation	Referee	Assistant referees
AFC	Matthew Breeze (Australia)	Jason Power (Australia); Benjamin Wilson (Australia)
AFC	Ravshan Irmatov (Uzbekistan)	Rafael Ilyasov (Uzbekistan); Abdukhamidullo Rasulov (Uzbekistan)
CAF	Coffi Codjia (Benin)	Alexis Fassinou (Benin); Desire Gahungu (Burundi)
CONCACAF	Benito Archundia (Mexico)	Marvin Torrentera (Mexico); Hector Vergara (Canada)
CONMEBOL	Carlos Simon (Brazil)	Roberto Braatz (Brazil); Altemir Hausmann (Brazil)
OFC	Peter O'Leary (New Zealand)	Brent Best (New Zealand); Matthew Taro (Solomon Islands)
UEFA	Roberto Rosetti (Italy)	Stefano Ayroldi (Italy); Cristiano Copelli (Italy)

== Matches ==
The official draw was held in Abu Dhabi on 12 November 2009 to decide the opposition to be faced by the three teams that begin the tournament at the quarter-final stage.

Play-off for quarter-finals
9 December – Abu Dhabi (MBZ)
(United Arab Emirates) Al-Ahli	0
(New Zealand) Auckland City	2

Quarter-finals
11 December – Abu Dhabi (MBZ)
(Democratic Republic of the Congo) TP Mazembe	1
(South Korea) Pohang Steelers	2
12 December – Abu Dhabi (ZSC)
(New Zealand) Auckland City	0
(Mexico) Atlante	3

Semi-finals
15 December – Abu Dhabi (MBZ)
(South Korea) Pohang Steelers	1
(Argentina) Estudiantes	2
16 December – Abu Dhabi (ZSC)
(Mexico) Atlante	1
(Spain) Barcelona	3
Match for fifth place
16 December – Abu Dhabi (ZSC)
(Democratic Republic of the Congo) TP Mazembe	2
(New Zealand) Auckland City	3

Final
19 December – Abu Dhabi (ZSC)
(Argentina) Estudiantes	1
(Spain) Barcelona (a.e.t.)	2
Match for third place
19 December – Abu Dhabi (ZSC)
(South Korea) Pohang Steelers (p)	1 (4)
(Mexico) Atlante	1 (3)

All times are local, GST (UTC+4).

=== Play-off for quarter-finals ===
9 December 2009
20:00

Al-Ahli (United Arab Emirates)	0–2	(New Zealand) Auckland City
	Report	Dickinson 45'; Coombes 67'

Mohammed bin Zayed Stadium, Abu Dhabi
Attendance: 14,856
Referee: Carlos Eugênio Simon (Brazil)

=== Quarter-finals ===
11 December 2009
20:00

TP Mazembe (Democratic Republic of the Congo)	1–2	(South Korea) Pohang Steelers
Bedi 28'	Report	Denílson 50', 78'

Mohammed bin Zayed Stadium, Abu Dhabi
Attendance: 9,627
Referee: Peter O'Leary (New Zealand)

12 December 2009
20:00

Auckland City (New Zealand)	0–3	(Mexico) Atlante
	Report	Arreola 36'; Bermúdez 69'; Silva 90+1'

Zayed Sports City Stadium, Abu Dhabi
Attendance: 7,222
Referee: Coffi Codjia (Benin)

=== Semi-finals ===
15 December 2009
20:00

Pohang Steelers (South Korea)	1–2	(Argentina) Estudiantes
Denílson 71'	Report	Benítez 45+2', 53'

Mohammed bin Zayed Stadium, Abu Dhabi
Attendance: 22,626
Referee: Roberto Rosetti (Italy)

16 December 2009
20:00

Atlante (Mexico)	1–3	(Spain) Barcelona
Rojas 5'	Report	Busquets 35'; Messi 55'; Pedro 67'

Zayed Sports City Stadium, Abu Dhabi
Attendance: 40,955
Referee: Carlos Eugênio Simon (Brazil)

=== Match for fifth place ===
16 December 2009
17:00

TP Mazembe (Democratic Republic of the Congo)	2–3	(New Zealand) Auckland City
Kasongo 60'; Kasusula 67'	Report	Hayne 29', 72'; Van Steeden 90+4'

Zayed Sports City Stadium, Abu Dhabi
Attendance: 4,200
Referee: Benito Archundia (Mexico)

=== Match for third place ===
19 December 2009
17:00

Pohang Steelers (South Korea)	1–1	(Mexico) Atlante
Denílson 42'	Report	Márquez Lugo 46'
Penalties
No Byung-jun (penalty scored); Denílson (penalty scored); Shin Hyung-min (penalty scored); Park Hee-chul (penalty missed); Kim Hyung-il (penalty scored)	4–3	(penalty scored) Solari; (penalty missed) Márquez Lugo; (penalty missed) Peralta; (penalty scored) Silva; (penalty scored) Vilar

Zayed Sports City Stadium, Abu Dhabi
Attendance: 13,814
Referee: Matthew Breeze (Australia)

=== Final ===
19 December 2009
20:00

Estudiantes (Argentina)	1–2 (a.e.t.)	(Spain) Barcelona
Boselli 37'	Report	Pedro 89'; Messi 110'

Zayed Sports City Stadium, Abu Dhabi
Attendance: 43,050
Referee: Benito Archundia (Mexico)

== Goalscorers ==
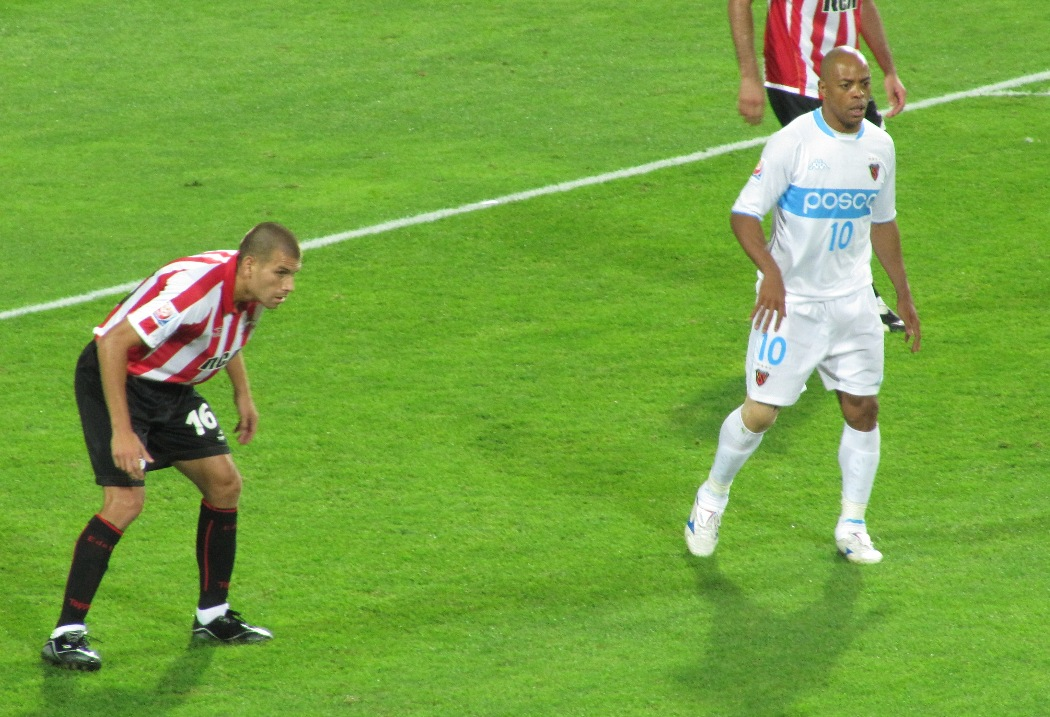
Denílson of Pohang Steelers (right) against Estudiantes in the semi-finals

Rank	Player	Team	Goals
1	(Brazil) Denílson	(South Korea) Pohang Steelers	4
2	(Argentina) Leandro Benítez	(Argentina) Estudiantes	2
2	(New Zealand) Jason Hayne	(New Zealand) Auckland City	2
2	(Argentina) Lionel Messi	(Spain) Barcelona	2
2	(Spain) Pedro	(Spain) Barcelona	2
6	(Mexico) Daniel Arreola	(Mexico) Atlante	1
6	(Democratic Republic of the Congo) Mbenza Bedi	(Democratic Republic of the Congo) TP Mazembe	1
6	(Mexico) Christian Bermúdez	(Mexico) Atlante	1
6	(Argentina) Mauro Boselli	(Argentina) Estudiantes	1
6	(New Zealand) Chad Coombes	(New Zealand) Auckland City	1
6	(England) Adam Dickinson	(New Zealand) Auckland City	1
6	(Democratic Republic of the Congo) Ngandu Kasongo	(Democratic Republic of the Congo) TP Mazembe	1
6	(Democratic Republic of the Congo) Jean Kasusula	(Democratic Republic of the Congo) TP Mazembe	1
6	(Mexico) Rafael Márquez Lugo	(Mexico) Atlante	1
6	(Mexico) Guillermo Rojas	(Mexico) Atlante	1
6	(Spain) Sergio Busquets	(Spain) Barcelona	1
6	(Brazil) Lucas Silva	(Mexico) Atlante	1
6	(New Zealand) Riki van Steeden	(New Zealand) Auckland City	1

== Prize money ==
- Winners: $5 million
- Runners-up: $4 million
- Third place: $2.5 million
- Fourth place: $2 million
- Fifth place: $1.5 million
- Sixth place: $1 million
- Seventh place: $0.5 million
- Total: $16.5 million

== Awards ==
Adidas Golden Ball Toyota Award	Adidas Silver Ball	Adidas Bronze Ball
(Argentina) Lionel Messi (Barcelona)	(Argentina) Juan Sebastián Verón (Estudiantes)	(Spain) Xavi (Barcelona)
FIFA Fair Play Award
(Mexico) Atlante
