= Zoran Rendulić =

Serbian footballer (born 1984)

Personal information
- Date of birth: 22 May 1984 (age 42)
- Place of birth: Sarajevo, SFR Yugoslavia
- Height: 1.90 m (6 ft 3 in)
- Position: Centre-back

Team information
- Current team: Radnik Surdulica

Youth career
- Željezničar Sarajevo
- Rad
- OFK Beograd
- Partizan
- Železnik

Senior career*
Years	Team	Apps	(Gls)
2002	Remont Čačak	14	(0)
2002–2008	Borac Čačak	65	(1)
2004	→ Remont Čačak (loan)	14	(0)
2006	→ Remont Čačak (loan)	13	(0)
2007	→ Ried (loan)	1	(0)
2008–2010	Grenoble	15	(0)
2010–2011	Javor Ivanjica	34	(9)
2012	Pohang Steelers	18	(0)
2013–2014	Shenyang Shenbei	55	(5)
2015	Čukarički	12	(2)
2015–2017	Red Star Belgrade	19	(1)
2017	Ordabasy	4	(0)
2017	Rad	5	(0)
2018	Čukarički	0	(0)

International career
2006–2007	Serbia U21	3	(0)

Managerial career
- 2019–2020: Čukarički (assistant)
- 2020: IMT
- 2020–2021: Čukarički (assistant)
- 2021–2022: Rad
- 2022–2023: Red Star Belgrade (youth)
- 2023–2026: Red Star Belgrade (assistant)
- 2026–: Radnik Surdulica
- * Club domestic league appearances and goals

Zoran Rendulić (Serbian Cyrillic: Зоран Peндулић; born 22 May 1984) is a Serbian football coach and a former defender.

== Club career ==
Rendulić played for on loan for SV Ried in Austria from January to June 2007 and then returned to Borac Čačak. On 24 June 2008, he joined the French club Grenoble which were promoted to Ligue 1.

In the summer of 2010 Rendulić signed one-year contract with FK Javor Ivanjica, where provides a great games. He scored two goals for this club. Following the contract with Javor expired, he agreed an offer to join K-League powerhouse Pohang Steelers in December 2011. The debut goal scored against Gamba Osaka in the 2012 AFC Champions League match.

In January 2015, Rendulić returned to Serbia and signed with FK Čukarički. After great half season with Čukarički, Rendulić was wanted by some of the best clubs in Serbia, but he finally signed with Red Star Belgrade.

Rendulić left FC Ordabasy in June 2017.

In summer 2017, Rendulić signed with Rad, and moved back to Čukarički in the mid-season.

== Coaching career ==
In September 2021, he was hired as head coach of Rad in the Serbian First League.

== Managerial statistics ==
As of 3 November 2026

Managerial record by team and tenure
Team	From	To	Record				
Team	From	To	G	W	D	L	Win %
IMT	1 September 2020	12 December 2020	18	7	6	5	38.89
Rad	6 July 2021	1 February 2022	31	14	8	9	45.16
Red Star Belgrade (youth)	12 July 2022	23 July 2023	69	54	6	9	78.26
Radnik Surdulica	1 June 2026	Present	15	6	5	4	40.00
Career total			133	81	25	27	60.90

== Honours ==
Rendulić was elected as one of the "Top 11" Serbian Superleague players for the 2014–15 season.

=== Club ===
Pohang Steelers

- Korean FA Cup: 2011–12

Čukarički

- Serbian Cup: 2014–15

Red Star Belgrade

- Serbian SuperLiga: 2015–16
