= Kwon Jip =

South Korean footballer (born 1984)

Kwon Jip 권집
Personal information
- Full name: Kwon Jip
- Date of birth: 13 February 1984 (age 42)
- Place of birth: South Korea
- Height: 1.82 m (6 ft 0 in)
- Position: Midfielder

Senior career*
Years	Team	Apps	(Gls)
2003–2004	Suwon Bluewings	15	(0)
2005	Chunnam Dragons	0	(0)
2005–2007	Jeonbuk Hyundai	36	(1)
2008	Pohang Steelers	3	(0)
2008–2010	Daejeon Citizen	55	(1)
2011	Tianjin Teda	5	(0)
Total		114	(2)

International career
2002–2003	South Korea U-20	14	(1)
2004	South Korea U-23	2	(0)
- * Club domestic league appearances and goals as of 3 July 2011

- Kwon Jip
- Hangul: 권집
- Hanja: 權輯
- RR: Gwon Jip
- MR: Kwŏn Chip

Kwon Jip (Korean: 권집; born 13 February 1984) is a South Korean former footballer. He was involved in a match-fixing scandal and his football career was rescinded.

== Honors ==
=== Club ===
Suwon Bluwings

- K-League (1): 2004

Jeonbuk Hyundai Motors

- Korean FA Cup (1): 2005
- AFC Champions League (1): 2006

=== Individual ===
- 2002 Germany Everdingen Tournament Best Player 3rd
- 2002 AFC Youth Championship Best XI

== Club career statistics ==
Club performance			League		Cup		League Cup		Continental		Total	
Season	Club	League	Apps	Goals	Apps	Goals	Apps	Goals	Apps	Goals	Apps	Goals
Korea Republic			League		FA Cup		K-League Cup		Asia		Total	
2003	Suwon Samsung Bluewings	K-League	14	0	0	0	-		-		14	0
2004	Suwon Samsung Bluewings	K-League	1	0	2	0	2	0	-		5	0
2005	Chunnam Dragons	K-League	0	0	0	0	2	0	-		2	0
2005	Jeonbuk Hyundai Motors	K-League	5	0	0	0	8	0	-		13	0
2006	Jeonbuk Hyundai Motors	K-League	12	1	2	0	6	1	5	0	25	2
2007	Jeonbuk Hyundai Motors	K-League	19	0	1	0	4	0	2	0	26	0
2008	Pohang Steelers	K-League	3	0	0	0	0	0	2	0	5	0
2008	Daejeon Citizen	K-League	10	0	0	0	3	0	-		13	0
2009	Daejeon Citizen	K-League	23	0	4	0	3	0	-		30	0
2010	Daejeon Citizen	K-League	22	1	1	0	3	0	-		26	1
China PR			League		FA Cup		League Cup		Asia		Total	
2011	Tianjin Teda	Chinese Super League	5	0	0	0	-		4	0	9	0
Country	Korea Republic		109	2	10	0	31	1	9	0	159	3
Country	China PR		5	0	0	0	-		4	0	9	0
Total			114	2	10	0	31	1	13	0	165	3
