= Clodoaldo (footballer, born November 1978) =

Brazilian footballer

Personal information
- Full name: Clodoaldo Paulino de Lima
- Date of birth: 25 November 1978 (age 47)
- Place of birth: Paulínia (SP - Brazil)
- Height: 1.87 m (6 ft 2 in)
- Positions: Striker; attacking midfielder

Youth career
- 1998–2000: Guaçuano

Senior career*
Years	Team	Apps	(Gls)
2000	Guaçuano		
2001	São Paulo-RS		
2001	Deportivo Pasto		
2002	Independiente Medellín		
2003	Marcílio Dias		
2004	Caxias		
2005	Remo		
2006	Criciúma		
2007–2011	Corinthians		
2008	→ Pohang Steelers (loan)		
2008	→ Náutico (loan)		
2009	→ Santo André (loan)		
2009	→ Figueirense (loan)		
2011	Estoril		
2012	Americana		
2012	Uberaba		
2012	Metropolitano		
2012	Cruzeiro-RS		
2013	União Suzano		
2014	Atlético Cali	21	(5)
2015	Cotia	16	(3)
2016	Atlético Cali	12	(1)

Managerial career
- 2024–: Atlético Cali
- * Club domestic league appearances and goals

Clodoaldo Paulino de Lima, or simply Clodoaldo (born 25 November 1978), is a Brazilian former football striker, and current manager of Atlético Cali.

He played in Colombia from 2002 to 2003. In 2007, he was a member of the Corinthians team that was relegated to Serie B, scoring in their final match against Grêmio.

In May 2009 he left Santo André for Figueirense Futebol Clube.

As of March 2012 he was playing for Uberaba.

In January 2013 he signed for Cruzeiro-RS, having played in friendly matches for União Suzano in Bolivia towards the end of 2012.

In January 2014 he joined Depor FC from Brazilian side Suzano.
