= Vaguinho (footballer, born 1981) =

Brazilian footballer

Personal information
- Full name: Vágner Luiz da Silva
- Date of birth: September 13, 1981 (age 45)
- Place of birth: Mococa, Brazil
- Height: 1.74 m (5 ft 8 1/2 in)
- Position: Midfielder

Senior career*
Years	Team	Apps	(Gls)
2001–2002	Radium		
2003–2005	Ponte Preta		
2005–2006	Joinville		
2007–2009	Portuguesa		
2009	Joinville		
2009	Pohang Steelers	4	(0)
2010	América RN		
2011	União Rondonópolis		
2012	Monte Azul		
2013	Tianjin Songjiang	10	(2)
- * Club domestic league appearances and goals

Vágner Luiz da Silva (born September 13, 1981 in Mococa, Brazil) it is a Brazilian footballer.

Vaguinho previously played for Ponte Preta and Portuguesa in the Campeonato Brasileiro.

Vaguinho transferred to China League One side Tianjin Songjiang in January 2013.
