= Kim Gwang-seok (footballer) =

South Korean footballer (born 1983)

Personal information
- Date of birth: 12 February 1983 (age 43)
- Place of birth: South Korea
- Height: 1.83 m (6 ft 0 in)
- Position: Defender

Team information
- Current team: Incheon United
- Number: 3

Youth career
- 1998–2000: Cheongpyeong High School
- 2001–2002: Uiduk University

Senior career*
Years	Team	Apps	(Gls)
2003–2020	Pohang Steelers	364	(9)
2005–2006	→ Gwangju Sangmu (military service)	22	(1)
2021-	Incheon United	41	(1)
- * Club domestic league appearances and goals as of 20 September 2022

- Kim Gwang-seok
- Hangul: 김광석
- Hanja: 金光奭
- RR: Gim Gwangseok
- MR: Kim Kwangsŏk

Kim Gwang-seok (Korean: 김광석; born 12 February 1983) is a South Korea football player.

== Honors ==
=== Club ===
Pohang Steelers

- K League 1
  - Winner : 2007
  - Runner-up : 2004
- KFA Cup
  - Winner : 2008
  - Runner-up : 2007
- K-League Cup Winner : 2009
- AFC Champions League Winner : 2009

== Club career statistics ==
As of 28 November 2011

Club performance			League		Cup		League Cup		Continental		Total	
Season	Club	League	Apps	Goals	Apps	Goals	Apps	Goals	Apps	Goals	Apps	Goals
South Korea			League		KFA Cup		League Cup		Asia		Total	
2003	Pohang Steelers	K League 1	9	0	1	0	-		-		10	0
2004	Pohang Steelers	K League 1	0	0	0	0	0	0	-		0	0
2005	Gwangju Sangmu	K League 1	10	1	1	0	0	0	-		11	1
2006	Gwangju Sangmu	K League 1	12	0	0	0	2	0	-		14	0
2007	Pohang Steelers	K League 1	12	0	5	2	5	0	-		22	2
2008	Pohang Steelers	K League 1	20	1	1	0	1	0	5	0	27	1
2009	Pohang Steelers	K League 1	17	0	0	0	4	0	9	0	29	0
2010	Pohang Steelers	K League 1	12	0	1	0	0	0	7	0	20	0
2011	Pohang Steelers	K League 1	31	0	4	0	3	0	-		38	0
Career total			123	2	14	2	13	0	21	0	171	4
