= Park Yun-hwa =

South Korean footballer (born 1978)

Park Yun-Hwa
Personal information
- Full name: Park Yun-Hwa
- Date of birth: 13 June 1978 (age 48)
- Place of birth: Wonju, Gangwon, South Korea
- Height: 1.76 m (5 ft 9 in)
- Position: Midfielder

Youth career
- Soongsil University

Senior career*
Years	Team	Apps	(Gls)
2001–2006	Anyang LG Cheetahs / FC Seoul	24	(1)
2004–2005	→ Gwangju Sangmu (military service)	32	(1)
2007	Daegu FC	22	(0)
2008	Pohang Steelers	0	(0)
2008–2010	Gyeongnam FC	2	(0)
Total		80	(2)
- * Club domestic league appearances and goals as of 21 February 2011

- Park Yun-hwa
- Hangul: 박윤화
- Hanja: 朴允和
- RR: Bak Yunhwa
- MR: Pak Yunhwa

Park Yun-Hwa (Korean: 박윤화; born 13 June 1978) is a South Korean football midfielder. His previous club is FC Seoul, Gwangju Sangmu (military service), Daegu FC and Gyeongnam FC.

== Club career statistics ==
Club performance			League		Cup		League Cup		Continental		Total	
Season	Club	League	Apps	Goals	Apps	Goals	Apps	Goals	Apps	Goals	Apps	Goals
South Korea			League		KFA Cup		League Cup		Asia		Total	
2001	Anyang LG Cheetahs	K-League	1	0	?	?	2	0	?	?		
2002	Anyang LG Cheetahs	K-League	14	1	?	?	1	0	?	?		
2003	Anyang LG Cheetahs	K-League	9	0	0	0	-		-		9	0
2004	Gwangju Sangmu	K-League	15	1	3	2	8	0	-		26	3
2005	Gwangju Sangmu	K-League	17	0	0	0	7	0	-		24	0
2006	FC Seoul	K-League	0	0	0	0	0	0	-		0	0
2007	Daegu FC	K-League	22	0	0	0	6	0	-		28	0
2008	Pohang Steelers	K-League	0	0	0	0	0	0	-		0	0
2008	Gyeongnam FC	K-League	1	0	3	0	1	0	-		5	0
2009	Gyeongnam FC	K-League	1	0	0	0	0	0	-		1	0
Career total			80	2	6	2	25	0	0	0	111	4
