= Cha Ji-ho =

South Korean footballer (born 1983)

Personal information
- Full name: Cha Ji-ho
- Date of birth: 23 March 1983 (age 43)
- Place of birth: Seoul, South Korea
- Height: 1.70 m (5 ft 7 in)
- Position: Midfielder

Youth career
- Hanyang High School

Senior career*
Years	Team	Apps	(Gls)
2004	Lyn	3	(0)
2005	Kongsvinger	2	(0)
2006	Busan I'Park	0	(0)
2007	Melbourne Knights	0	(0)
2008–2009	Roasso Kumamoto	32	(0)
2009	Pohang Steelers	0	(0)

International career
2003	South Korea U-20		
- * Club domestic league appearances and goals

Cha Ji-ho (Korean: 차지호; born 23 March 1983 in Seoul) is a retired South Korean football player.

Cha mostly played for Roasso Kumamoto.

== Club statistics ==
Club performance			League		Cup		League Cup		Continental		Total	
Season	Club	League	Apps	Goals	Apps	Goals	Apps	Goals	Apps	Goals	Apps	Goals
Norway			League		Norwegian Cup		League Cup		Europe		Total	
2004	Lyn	Eliteserien	3	0			-		0	0		
2005	Kongsvinger	1. divisjon	2	0			-		-			
South Korea			League		KFA Cup		League Cup		Asia		Total	
2006	Busan I'Park	K-League	0	0	0	0	0	0	-		0	0
Australia			League		Cup		League Cup		Oceania/Asia		Total	
2007	Melbourne Knights	Victorian Premier League	0	0	-		-		-		0	0
Japan			League		Emperor's Cup		League Cup		Asia		Total	
2008	Roasso Kumamoto	J2 League	26	0	1	0	-		-		27	0
2009	Roasso Kumamoto	J2 League	6	0	0	0	-		-		6	0
South Korea			League		KFA Cup		League Cup		Asia		Total	
2009	Pohang Steelers	K-League	0	0	0	0	0	0	0	0	0	0
Total	Norway		5	0			–		0	0		
Total	South Korea		0	0	0	0	0	0	0	0	0	0
Total	Australia		0	0	–		–		–		0	0
Total	Japan		32	0	1	0	–		–		33	0
Career total			37	0	1	0	0	0	0	0	38	0
