= Benjamin Wilson (referee) =

Australian football referee and accountant

Ben Wilson
- Full name: Benjamin David Wilson
- Born: 26 June 1975 (age 51); Australia
- Other occupation: Accountant
Years		Role
2000–2011		Referee

International
Years	League	Role
2000–2011	FIFA	Referee

Benjamin David Wilson (born 26 June 1975) is a retired Australian football referee. He is also an accountant. Wilson was a referee at the 2011 AFC Asian Cup.

== Career ==
Wilson has refereed internationally at the OFC Nations Cup, the 2005 FIFA World Youth Championship, the 2006 FIFA World Cup, and the 2007 FIFA Club World Cup. He has also been a referee in the Australia A-League since the 2005-06 season.
