= Cho Chan-ho =

South Korean footballer (born 1986)

Personal information
- Full name: Cho Chan-ho
- Date of birth: 10 April 1986 (age 40)
- Place of birth: South Korea
- Height: 1.70 m (5 ft 7 in)
- Position: Winger

Youth career
- 2005–2008: Yonsei University

Senior career*
Years	Team	Apps	(Gls)
2009–2015	Pohang Steelers	109	(20)
2015	→ Suwon Samsung Bluewings (loan)	6	(2)
2016–2017	FC Seoul	22	(0)
2018	Seoul E-Land	23	(5)

International career
2003	South Korea U17	5	(0)
2011–2013	South Korea	2	(0)
- * Club domestic league appearances and goals as of 1 December 2018

Cho Chan-ho (Korean: 조찬호; born 10 April 1986) is a South Korean football winger.

== International career ==
On 25 March 2011, Cho made his debut for national team in a friendly match against Honduras in which he came on as an 87th-minute substitute for Lee Yong-rae.
