= Shin Kwang-hoon =

South Korean footballer (born 1987)

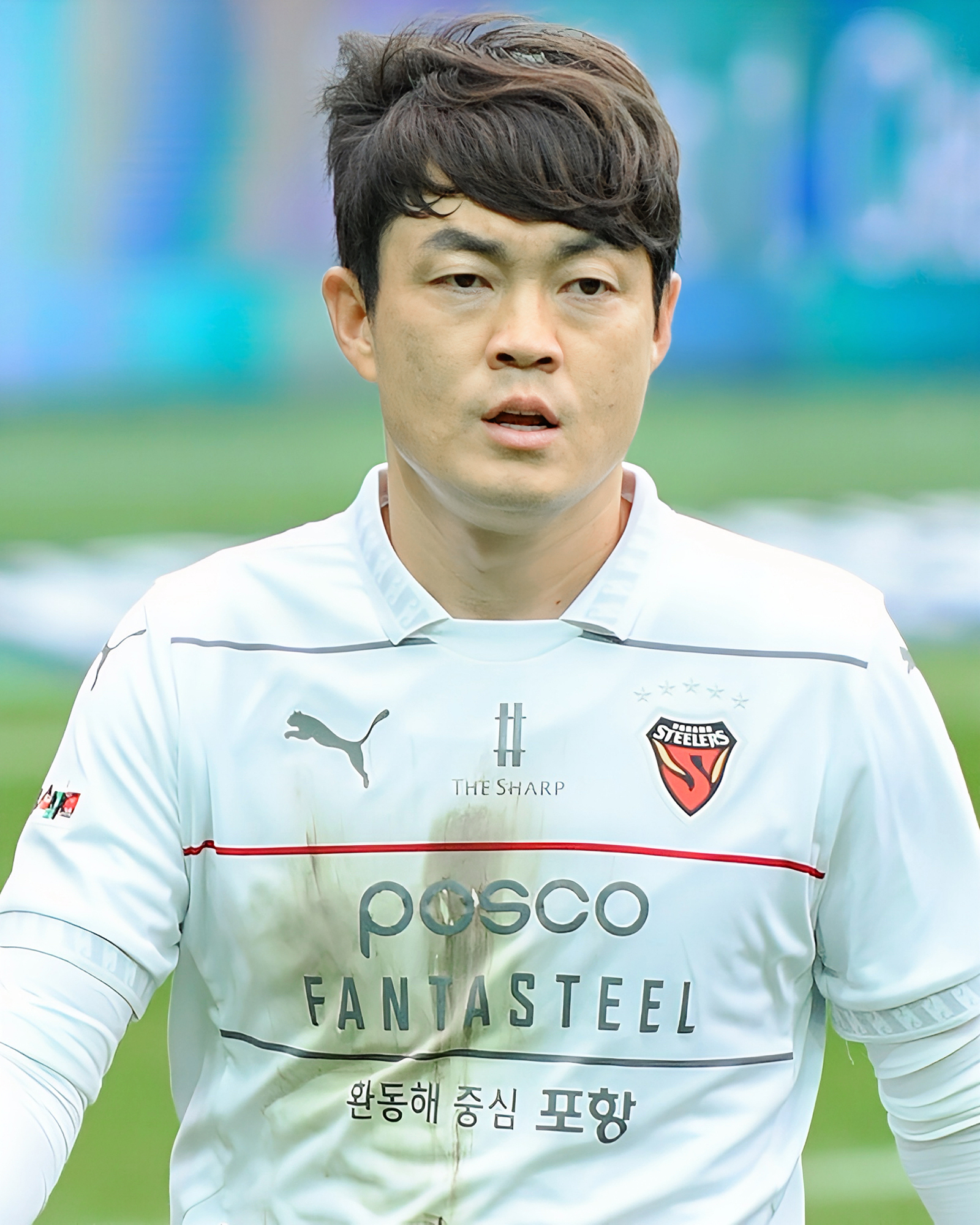
- Shin in 2025

Personal information
- Date of birth: 18 March 1987 (age 39)
- Place of birth: Mungyeong, Gyeongbuk, South Korea
- Height: 1.78 m (5 ft 10 in)
- Positions: Right back; right wing back

Team information
- Current team: Pohang Steelers
- Number: 17

Senior career*
Years	Team	Apps	(Gls)
2006–2016	Pohang Steelers	155	(4)
2008–2010	→ Jeonbuk Hyundai Motors (loan)	31	(0)
2015–2016	→ Ansan Police (military service)	43	(1)
2017–2018	FC Seoul	39	(0)
2019–2020	Gangwon FC	57	(2)
2021–	Pohang Steelers	165	(1)

International career^{‡}
2006–2007	South Korea U20	19	(1)
2007–2010	South Korea U23	16	(0)
2012–	South Korea	5	(0)
Medal record
Representing South Korea
Men's football
Asian Games
Bronze medal – third place	2010 Guangzhou	Team
- * Club domestic league appearances and goals as of 3 August 2026 ‡ National team caps and goals as of 13 January 2011

- Shin Kwang-hoon
- Hangul: 신광훈
- Hanja: 申光勳
- RR: Sin Gwanghun
- MR: Sin Kwanghun

Shin Kwang-hoon (Korean: 신광훈; born 18 March 1987) is a South Korean professional footballer who plays as a defender for Pohang Steelers.

== Club career ==
Having progressed through the youth academies at Pohang Steel Middle School and Pohang Steel High School, Shin made his professional debut with Pohang Steelers in 2006. In his first stint playing for the club he made 19 appearances, recording two goals and two assists. In 2008, the Steelers loaned Shin out to Jeonbuk Hyundai Motors as part of a player swap agreement which saw Stevica Ristić going in the opposite direction. The original deal would have seen Shin stay at Jeonbuk for two and a half years, but the clubs mutually agreed to end the contract early and Shin returned to Pohang in summer 2010. In December 2014 Shin began his military service, playing for Ansan Police FC until his discharge in September 2016.

On 3 January 2017, Shin joined FC Seoul, but while at the club he was forced to take almost two years off from football due to osteitis pubis. Having made a successful recovery, in 2019 he transferred to Gangwon FC. In 2021 Shin returned to his first team, Pohang, now as one of the oldest members of the squad.

== International career ==
He played for South Korea at the 2006 AFC Youth Championship and at the subsequent 2007 FIFA U-20 World Cup, 2008 Summer Olympics.

== Club career statistics ==
Club performance			League		Cup		League Cup		Continental		Other		Total	
Season	Club	League	Apps	Goals	Apps	Goals	Apps	Goals	Apps	Goals	Apps	Goals	Apps	Goals
South Korea			League		KFA Cup		League Cup		Asia		Play-off		Total	
2006	Pohang Steelers	K League 1	5	0	1	0	5	1	-		-		11	1
2007	Pohang Steelers	K League 1	2	0	2	0	3	1	-		-		7	1
2008	Pohang Steelers	K League 1	4	0	0	0	0	0	2	0	-		6	0
2008	Jeonbuk Hyundai Motors	K League 1	15	0	1	0	4	1	-		-		20	1
2009	Jeonbuk Hyundai Motors	K League 1	11	0	1	0	3	0	-		-		15	0
2010	Jeonbuk Hyundai Motors	K League 1	7	0	1	0	5	0	6	0	-		19	0
2010	Pohang Steelers	K League 1	8	0	0	0	0	0	1	0	-		9	0
2011	Pohang Steelers	K League 1	25	1	3	0	1	0	-		-		29	1
2012	Pohang Steelers	K League 1	37	0	5	0	-		5	0	-		47	0
2013	Pohang Steelers	K League 1	33	0	5	0	-		5	0	-		43	0
2014	Pohang Steelers	K League 1	33	3	2	0	-		8	0	-		43	3
2015	Ansan Mugunghwa	K League 2	28	1	0	0	-		-		-		28	1
2016	Ansan Mugunghwa	K League 2	15	0	1	0	-		-		-		16	0
2016	Pohang Steelers	K League 1	8	0	0	0	-		-		-		8	0
2017	FC Seoul	K League 1	21	0	0	0	-		3	0	-		24	0
2018	FC Seoul	K League 1	18	0	0	0	-		-		0	0	18	0
2019	Gangwon FC	K League 1	36	2	0	0	-		-		-		36	2
2020	Gangwon FC	K League 1	21	0	0	0	-		-		-		21	0
2021	Pohang Steelers	K League 1	33	1	1	0	-		9	0	-		43	1
2022	Pohang Steelers	K League 1	33	0	3	0	-		-		-		36	0
Total	South Korea		393	8	26	0	21	3	39	0	0	0	479	11
Career total			393	8	26	0	21	3	39	0	0	0	479	11

== Honours ==
=== Jeonbuk Hyundai Motors ===
- K League 1: 2009

=== Pohang Steelers ===
- K League 1: 2013
- Korean FA Cup: 2012, 2013, 2023, 2024
