= Kim Jae-sung =

South Korean footballer (born 1983)

Kim Jae-sung 김재성
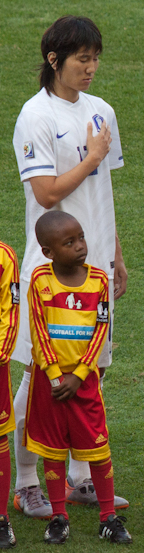
- Kim with South Korea at the 2010 FIFA World Cup

Personal information
- Full name: Kim Jae-sung
- Date of birth: 3 October 1983 (age 43)
- Place of birth: South Korea
- Height: 1.80 m (5 ft 11 in)
- Position: Centre midfielder

Team information
- Current team: Pohang Steelers (interim manager)

Youth career
- 2002–2004: Ajou University

Senior career*
Years	Team	Apps	(Gls)
2005–2007	Bucheon SK / Jeju United	63	(4)
2008–2014	Pohang Steelers	131	(17)
2012–2013	→ Sangju Sangmu (military service)	50	(7)
2015–2017	Seoul E-Land	55	(5)
2016	→ Jeju United (loan)	8	(0)
2017	Adelaide United	7	(0)
2017	Jeonnam Dragons	14	(0)
2018	Udon Thani	13	(0)
Total		341	(33)

International career
2010–2012	South Korea	16	(2)

Managerial career
- 2020–2024: Incheon United (assistant)
- 2026: Pohang Steelers (assistant)
- 2026–: Pohang Steelers (interim)
- * Club domestic league appearances and goals as of 00:11, 19 January 2018 (UTC)

Kim Jae-sung (Korean: 김재성, born 3 October 1983) is a South Korean former professional footballer who played as a midfielder. He is currently the interim manager of K League 1 club Pohang Steelers.

Kim previously played for Bucheon SK and Jeju United.

Kim graduated from the same Football Academy College as Park Ji-sung. He has said that he used to train with Ji Sung Park as a teenager at the college.

He has also had recent international duty call backs and was influential in the 3–1 victory over Japan in the 2010 East Asian Football Championship.

On 9 January 2010, Kim made his first international cap for South Korea at the friendly match against Zambia.

== Career statistics ==
=== Club ===
Appearances and goals by club, season and competition
Club	Season	League			Cup		League Cup		Continental		Other		Total	
Club	Season	Division	Apps	Goals	Apps	Goals	Apps	Goals	Apps	Goals	Apps	Goals	Apps	Goals
Bucheon SK/ Jeju United	2005	K League 1	23	1	0	0	12	1	—		—		35	2
Bucheon SK/ Jeju United	2006	K League 1	20	1	0	0	11	1	—		—		31	2
Bucheon SK/ Jeju United	2007	K League 1	20	2	4	0	4	0	—		—		28	2
Bucheon SK/ Jeju United	Total		63	4	4	0	27	2	—		—		94	6
Pohang Steelers	2008	K League 1	24	2	3	1	2	0	4	1	—		33	4
Pohang Steelers	2009	K League 1	22	1	1	0	3	0	12	4	2	0	40	5
Pohang Steelers	2010	K League 1	24	2	1	0	0	0	9	4	—		33	5
Pohang Steelers	2011	K League 1	29	5	3	0	1	0	—		—		33	5
Pohang Steelers	2013	K League 1	3	0	—		—		—		—		3	0
Pohang Steelers	2014	K League 1	29	7	2	0	—		6	0	—		37	7
Pohang Steelers	Total		131	17	10	1	6	0	31	9	2	0	180	27
Sangju Sangmu (army)	2012	K League 1	24	4	2	1	—		—		—		26	5
Sangju Sangmu (army)	2013	K League 1	26	3	2	0	—		—		—		28	3
Sangju Sangmu (army)	Total		50	7	4	1	—		—		—		54	8
Seoul E-Land	2015	K League 2	38	4	1	0	—		—		—		39	4
Seoul E-Land	2016	K League 2	17	1	2	0	—		—		—		19	1
Seoul E-Land	Total		55	5	3	0	—		—		—		58	5
Jeju United	2016	K League 1	8	0	—		—		—		—		8	0
Adelaide United	2016–17	A-League	7	0	—		—		4	1	—		11	1
Jeonnam Dragons	2017	K League 1	14	0	1	0	—		—		—		15	0
Udon Thani	2018	Thai League 2	13	0	0	0	0	0	—		—		13	0
Career total			341	33	22	2	33	2	35	10	2	0	433	46

=== International ===
Appearances and goals by national team and year
National team	Year	Apps	Goals
South Korea	2010	11	2
South Korea	2011	2	0
South Korea	2012	3	0
Total		16	2

Scores and results list South Korea's goal tally first.

List of international goals scored by Kim Jae-sung
No.	Date	Venue	Opponent	Score	Result	Competition
1	22 January 2010	Málaga, Spain	Latvia	1–0	1–0	Friendly
2	14 February 2010	Tokyo, Japan	Japan	3–1	3–1	2010 East Asian Football Championship

== Managerial statistics ==
As of match played 4 November 2026

Managerial record by team and tenure
Team	Nat.	From	To	Record								Ref.
Team	Nat.	From	To	G	W	D	L	GF	GA	GD	Win %	Ref.
Pohang Steelers (interim)	(South Korea)	30 October 2026	Present	2	0	2	0	4	4	+0	0.00	
Career Total				2	0	2	0	4	4	+0	0.00	

== Honours ==
=== Club ===
Pohang Steelers

- Korean FA Cup: 2008
- Korean League Cup: 2009
- AFC Champions League: 2009
