= Kim Tae-su =

South Korean footballer (born 1981)

Personal information
- Full name: Kim Tae-su
- Date of birth: 25 August 1981 (age 45)
- Place of birth: South Korea
- Height: 1.80 m (5 ft 11 in)
- Position: Midfielder

Youth career
- Kwangwoon University

Senior career*
Years	Team	Apps	(Gls)
2004–2008	Chunnam Dragons	94	(8)
2009–2015	Pohang Steelers	144	(7)
2016	Incheon United	23	(1)
2017	Seoul E-Land	9	(1)
2018–	FC Anyang	1	(0)
- * Club domestic league appearances and goals as of 1 January 2019

Kim Tae-su (Korean: 김태수; born 25 August 1981) is a South Korean football midfielder who plays for FC Anyang.

He transferred from Chunnam Dragons on 28 January 2009.

== Honours ==
Chunnam Dragons

- KFA Cup

Winner (2): 2006, 2007

- League Cup

Runner-up: 2008

Pohang Steelers

- K League Classic

Winner: 2013

- KFA Cup

Winner: 2012, 2013

- League Cup

Winner: 2009

- AFC Champions League

Winner: 2009

== Club career statistics ==
As of 1 December 2016

Club performance			League		Cup		League Cup		Continental		Total	
Season	Club	League	Apps	Goals	Apps	Goals	Apps	Goals	Apps	Goals	Apps	Goals
South Korea			League		KFA Cup		League Cup		Asia		Total	
2004	Chunnam Dragons	K League	13	0	1	0	8	0	—		22	0
2005	Chunnam Dragons	K League	19	1	3	0	9	0	—		31	1
2006	Chunnam Dragons	K League	21	3	4	1	12	0	—		37	4
2007	Chunnam Dragons	K League	23	3	5	1	1	0	3	1	32	5
2008	Chunnam Dragons	K League	20	1	1	0	1	0	3	2	25	3
2009	Pohang Steelers	K League	22	5	0	0	5	1	15	0	42	6
2010	Pohang Steelers	K League	21	0	1	0	2	0	7	1	31	1
2011	Pohang Steelers	K League	22	1	2	0	2	1	—		26	2
2012	Pohang Steelers	K League	8	0	1	0	—		4	1	13	1
2013	Pohang Steelers	K League	18	0	4	0	—		0	0	22	0
2014	Pohang Steelers	K League	28	0	1	0	—		9	3	38	3
2015	Pohang Steelers	K League	26	1	2	0	—		—		28	1
2016	Incheon United	K League	23	1	1	0	—		—		24	1
Career total			264	16	26	2	40	2	41	8	371	28
