= 2009 Korean League Cup =

2009 Peace Cup Korea

Tournament details
- Country: South Korea
- Dates: 25 March – 16 September 2009
- Teams: 15

Final positions
- Champions: Pohang Steelers (2nd title)
- Runners-up: Busan IPark

Tournament statistics
- Top goal scorer(s): Yoo Chang-hyun; No Byung-jun; Park Hee-do (4 goals each)

The 2009 Korean League Cup, also known as the Peace Cup Korea 2009, was the 22nd competition of the Korean League Cup. It began on 25 March 2009, and ended on 16 September 2009.

== Group stage ==
All K League clubs excluding participating clubs of the 2009 AFC Champions League entered the group stage. Clubs ranked odd-numbered places in the 2008 K League were assigned to the Group A, and even-numbered clubs were assigned to the Group B. The fledgling club Gangwon FC entered the Group A. The top two clubs of each group qualified for the knockout stage.

=== Group A ===
Pos	Team	Pld	W	D	L	GF	GA	GD	Pts	SIC	ICU	DGU	JND	DJC	GWN
1	Seongnam Ilhwa Chunma	5	3	2	0	9	2	+7	11	—	1–1	—	4–1	—	—
2	Incheon United	5	2	2	1	6	6	0	8	—	—	—	—	1–0	3–2
3	Daegu FC	5	2	1	2	6	6	0	7	0–0	2–0	—	—	—	2–1
4	Jeonnam Dragons	5	2	1	2	8	10	−2	7	—	1–1	3–2	—	—	—
5	Daejeon Citizen	5	2	0	3	4	7	−3	6	0–2	—	2–0	2–1	—	—
6	Gangwon FC	5	1	0	4	7	9	−2	3	0–2	—	—	1–2	3–0	—

Source: RSSSF

=== Group B ===
Pos	Team	Pld	W	D	L	GF	GA	GD	Pts	JJU	BIP	JHM	GNM	GWJ
1	Jeju United	4	3	1	0	8	3	+5	10	—	—	1–0	—	4–1
2	Busan IPark	4	2	2	0	7	3	+4	8	1–1	—	—	2–0	—
3	Jeonbuk Hyundai Motors	4	1	1	2	8	9	−1	4	—	2–4	—	—	4–2
4	Gyeongnam FC	4	1	1	2	4	6	−2	4	1–2	—	2–2	—	—
5	Gwangju Sangmu	4	0	1	3	3	9	−6	1	—	0–0	—	0–1	—

Source: RSSSF

== Knockout stage ==
=== Teams ===
Team	Placement
Suwon Samsung Bluewings	Champions League qualified team
FC Seoul	Champions League qualified team
Ulsan Hyundai	Champions League qualified team
Pohang Steelers	Champions League qualified team
Seongnam Ilhwa Chunma	Group A winners
Jeju United	Group B winners
Incheon United	Group A runners-up
Busan IPark	Group B runners-up

=== Bracket ===
Quarter-finals
B2	Busan IPark (p)	3	0	3 (5)
A1	Seongnam Ilhwa Chunma	2	1	3 (4)
B1	Jeju United	0	1	1
CL	Ulsan Hyundai	1	4	5
CL	FC Seoul (p)	0	1	1 (5)
A2	Incheon United	0	1	1 (3)
CL	Pohang Steelers	3	1	4
CL	Suwon Samsung Bluewings	0	0	0

Semi-finals
Busan IPark	2	1	3
Ulsan Hyundai	1	0	1
FC Seoul	2	2	4
Pohang Steelers	1	5	6

Final
Busan IPark	1	1	2
Pohang Steelers	1	5	6

== Goalscorers ==
4 goals

- (South Korea) Yoo Chang-hyun (Pohang)
- (South Korea) No Byung-jun (Pohang)
- (South Korea) Park Hee-do (Busan)

3 goals

- (South Korea) Yang Dong-hyen (Busan)
- (Brazil) Adriano Chuva (Jeonnam)
- (South Korea) Cho Hyung-ik (Daegu)
- (Brazil) Eninho (Jeonbuk)
- (South Korea) Han Dong-won (Seongnam)

2 goals

- (South Korea) Lee Seung-ryul (Seoul)
- (South Korea) Chung Kyung-ho (Gangwon)
- (South Korea) Lee Sung-min (Gangwon)
- (South Korea) Kim Tae-min (Gwangju)
- (South Korea) Park Min (Gyeongnam)
- (South Korea) Yoo Byung-soo (Incheon)
- (Brazil) Jóbson (Jeju)
- (Brazil) Ricardinho (Jeju)
- (Brazil) Denilson (Pohang)
- (South Korea) Hwang Jin-sung (Pohang)
- (South Korea) Cho Dong-geon (Seongnam)
- (South Korea) Kim Jin-yong (Seongnam)
- (South Korea) Kim Jung-woo (Seongnam)
- (Brazil) Mota (Seongnam)
- (Brazil) Rômulo Marques Macedo (Busan)
- (South Korea) Lee Sang-duk (Daegu)
- (South Korea) Ko Chang-hyun (Daejeon)

1 goal

- (South Korea) Han Sang-woon (Busan)
- (South Korea) Jeong Shung-hoon (Busan)
- (South Korea) Lee Gang-jin (Busan)
- (South Korea) Lee Jung-ho (Busan)
- (South Korea) Lee Seung-hyun (Busan)
- (South Korea) Min Young-ki (Busan)
- (South Korea) Jung Yoon-sung (Jeonnam)
- (South Korea) Kim Myung-woon (Jeonnam)
- (South Korea) Ko Cha-won (Jeonnam)
- (South Korea) Lee Kyu-ro (Jeonnam)
- (South Korea) Lee Jung-youl (Jeonnam)
- (Serbia) Lazar Popović (Daegu)
- (South Korea) Park Sung-ho (Daejeon)
- (Brazil) Ricardo Costa (Daejeon)
- (Brazil) Anderson (Seoul)
- (Brazil) Adilson (Seoul)
- (South Korea) Ki Sung-yueng (Seoul)
- (South Korea) Moon Joo-won (Gangwon)
- (South Korea) Park Jong-jin (Gangwon)
- (South Korea) Kang Jin-kyu (Gwangju)
- (South Korea) Kim Tae-wook (Gyeongnam)
- (South Korea) Seo Sang-min (Gyeongnam)
- (Serbia) Borko Veselinović (Incheon)
- (North Macedonia) Dragan Čadikovski (Incheon)
- (South Korea) Kang Soo-il (Incheon)
- (South Korea) Kim Sang-rok (Incheon)
- (South Korea) Woo Sung-yong (Incheon)
- (South Korea) Choi Hyun-yeon (Jeju)
- (South Korea) Koo Ja-cheol (Jeju)
- (South Korea) Oh Bong-jin (Jeju)
- (South Korea) Shim Young-sung (Jeju)
- (South Korea) Ha Dae-sung (Jeonbuk)
- (South Korea) Jung Hoon (Jeonbuk)
- (South Korea) Lee Dong-gook (Jeonbuk)
- (South Korea) Lee Hyun-seung (Jeonbuk)
- (Brazil) Luiz Henrique (Jeonbuk)
- (South Korea) Kim Gi-dong (Pohang)
- (South Korea) Kim Tae-su (Pohang)
- (South Korea) Song Chang-ho (Pohang)
- (North Macedonia) Stevica Ristić (Pohang)
- (South Korea) Ko Jae-sung (Seongnam)
- (South Korea) Cho Jin-soo (Ulsan)
- (South Korea) Hyun Young-min (Ulsan)
- (South Korea) Lee Dong-won (Ulsan)
- (South Korea) Lee Jin-ho (Ulsan)
- (North Macedonia) Slavčo Georgievski (Ulsan)
- (South Korea) Yeom Ki-hun (Ulsan)

1 own goal

- (South Korea) Kim Hyung-ho (Jeonnam)
- (South Korea) Kim Sang-sik (Jeonbuk)

== Awards ==
Award	Player	Team	Points
Top goalscorer	(South Korea) Yoo Chang-hyun	Pohang Steelers	4 goals
Top assist provider	(South Korea) Cho Chan-ho	Pohang Steelers	3 assists

== See also ==
- 2009 in South Korean football
- 2009 K League
- 2009 Korean FA Cup
