= Kim Hyung-il =

South Korean footballer (born 1984)

Kim Hyung-il 김형일
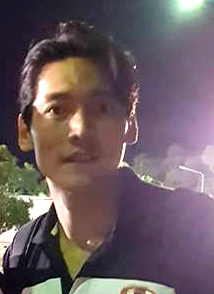
- Kim in 2018

Personal information
- Full name: Kim Hyung-il
- Date of birth: 27 April 1984 (age 42)
- Place of birth: Incheon, South Korea
- Height: 1.87 m (6 ft 2 in)
- Position: Centre back

Team information
- Current team: Liaoning Tieren (assistant coach)

Youth career
- Kyunghee University

Senior career*
Years	Team	Apps	(Gls)
2007–2008	Daejeon Citizen	33	(0)
2008–2014	Pohang Steelers	83	(5)
2012–2013	→ Sangju Sangmu (army)	43	(1)
2015–2016	Jeonbuk Hyundai Motors	37	(0)
2017	Guangzhou Evergrande	0	(0)
2017–2018	Bucheon FC 1995	10	(0)
2018	Navy	15	(1)
2021	Incheon Hon	0	(0)

International career^{‡}
2009	South Korea	2	(0)

Managerial career
- 2023–2025: Chengdu Rongcheng (assistant)
- 2026–: Liaoning Tieren (assistant)
- * Club domestic league appearances and goals as of 1 January 2018 ‡ National team caps and goals as of 18 November 2009

- Kim Hyung-il
- Hangul: 김형일
- Hanja: 金亨鎰
- RR: Gim Hyeongil
- MR: Kim Hyŏngil

Kim Hyung-il (Korean: 김형일; born 27 April 1984) is a South Korean football coach and former footballer who played as a defender.

== Career ==
In March 2009, he was selected for the South Korea national football team. On 3 June 2009, he played at first senior level game against Oman national football team.

On 24 December 2016, Kim joined Chinese Super League champions Guangzhou Evergrande on a half-year contract for free transfer. He left Guangzhou in June 2017 without playing any match for the club.

Kim joined K League 2 side Bucheon FC 1995 on 29 June 2017.

After retiring from football, Kim signed with DH Entertainment.

== Club career statistics ==
As of 28 November 2011

Club performance			League		Cup		League Cup		Continental		Total	
Season	Club	League	Apps	Goals	Apps	Goals	Apps	Goals	Apps	Goals	Apps	Goals
South Korea			League		KFA Cup		League Cup		Asia		Total	
2007	Daejeon Citizen	K League 1	21	0	1	0	8	0	-		30	0
2008	Daejeon Citizen	K League 1	13	0	1	0	3	0	-		17	0
2008	Pohang Steelers	K League 1	3	0	1	0	0	0	0	0	4	0
2009	Pohang Steelers	K League 1	24	2	3	0	5	0	10	1	42	3
2010	Pohang Steelers	K League 1	22	2	1	0	0	0	7	0	30	2
2011	Pohang Steelers	K League 1	19	0	4	0	2	0	-		25	0
Career total			102	4	11	0	18	0	17	1	148	5

== Honours ==
=== Club ===
Pohang Steelers

- K League 1 (1) : 2013
- Korean FA Cup (1) : 2008
- K-League Cup (1) : 2009
- AFC Champions League (1) : 2009

Sangju Sangmu Phoenix

- K League 2 (1) : 2013

Jeonbuk Hyundai Motors

- K League 1 (1) : 2015
- AFC Champions League (1) : 2016

=== Individual ===
Pohang Steelers

- K-League Best XI (1) : 2009

Sangju Sangmu Phoenix

- K League Challenge Best 11 (1) : 2013
