= Denílson (footballer, born 1976) =

Brazilian footballer

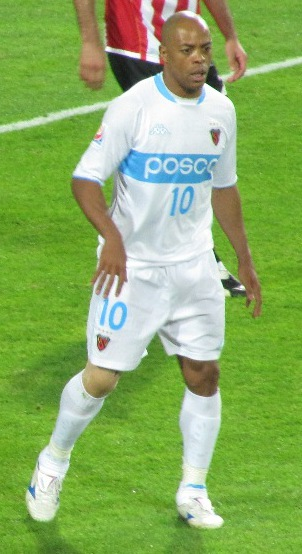
- Denílson with Pohang Steelers during the 2009 Club World Cup

Personal information
- Full name: Denílson Martins Nascimento
- Date of birth: 4 September 1976 (age 50)
- Place of birth: Salvador, Brazil
- Height: 1.79 m (5 ft 10 1/2 in)
- Position: Forward

Senior career*
Years	Team	Apps	(Gls)
1995–1996	Camaçari		
1996–1997	Feyenoord	0	(0)
1997	Paris Saint-Germain	0	(0)
1998–1999	União Lamas	40	(4)
1999–2002	Al-Shabab	?	(36)
2002–2004	Dubai Club		
2004–2005	Al-Nasr	?	(1)
2005	Atlas	11	(0)
2006–2007	Daejeon Citizen	42	(21)
2008–2009	Pohang Steelers	43	(14)
2010	Bunyodkor	14	(4)
2011	Mogi Mirim	16	(2)
2011	Guarani	30	(5)
2012	Al Khaleej		
2012	CRB	8	(6)
2013	Red Bull Brasil	8	(0)
2013–2014	CRB	21	(9)
2014	Coruripe	7	(3)
2015	Bonsucesso	7	(3)
- * Club domestic league appearances and goals as of 20 July 2015

Denílson Martins Nascimento (born 4 September 1976), simply known as Denílson, is a Brazilian former professional footballer.

== Club career ==
Born in Salvador, Bahia, Denílson moved abroad at the age of 20. He was, however, limited to reserve team football with both Feyenoord and Paris Saint-Germain, and signed with Portuguese club União Lamas in January 1998.

After six years in the United Arab Emirates, mainly at the service of Al Shabab, and a brief stint in the Liga MX with Club Atlas, Denílson joined South Korea's Daejon Citizen initially on a three-month contract, returning later for one 1/2 years. He helped fellow K-League team Pohang Steelers finish third at the 2009 FIFA Club World Cup, scoring four goals in three games.

On 29 December 2009 Denílson signed for Bunyodkor in Uzbekistan, partnering Rivaldo at that and his following club, Mogi Mirim. He continued playing well into his 30s, making his debut in the Série B at the age of 35 with Guarani.

== Honours ==
Pohang Steelers

- AFC Champions League: 2009
- Korean FA Cup: 2008
- Korean League Cup: 2009

Individual

- FIFA Club World Cup Top Scorer: 2009
- K-League Best XI: 2009
