= Stevica Ristić =

Macedonian footballer

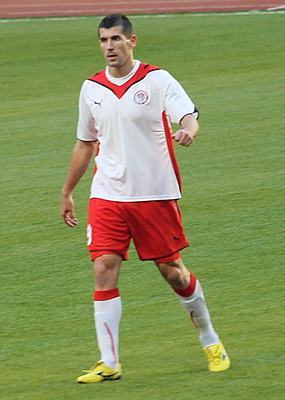

Personal information
- Date of birth: 23 May 1982 (age 44)
- Place of birth: Vršac, SFR Yugoslavia
- Height: 1.89 m (6 ft 2 in)
- Position: Striker

Senior career*
| Years | Team | Apps | (Gls) |
| 2001–2002 | Jedinstvo Vršac | | |
| 2002–2003 | Mladost Lukićevo | 27 | (8) |
| 2003–2006 | Sileks | 107 | (84) |
| 2007–2009 | Jeonbuk Hyundai Motors | 35 | (14) |
| 2008–2009 | → Pohang Steelers (loan) | 32 | (13) |
| 2010 | Bunyodkor | 17 | (11) |
| 2010–2011 | Amkar Perm | 23 | (6) |
| 2011–2013 | Suwon Bluewings | 61 | (24) |
| 2013 | Shonan Bellmare | 8 | (1) |
| 2014–2016 | Jeonnam Dragons | 84 | (27) |
| 2017 | Temnić | | |

International career
| 2007–2012 | Macedonia | 17 | (1) |
- * Club domestic league appearances and goals

Stevica "Stevo" Ristić (Macedonian: Стевица Ристиќ, Serbian Cyrillic: Стевица Ристић; born 23 May 1982) is a former professional footballer who played as a striker. Born in Yugoslavia, he represented the Macedonia national team.

== Club career ==
He played for Jedinstvo Vršac in 2001–02 in FR Yugoslavia third level, and then with Mladost Lukićevo in Second League of FR Yugoslavia. Then, he moved, in 2003, to Macedonia to play with FK Sileks from Kratovo. He was the best striker in Makedonska 1. Liga over his first three seasons with them and his great form earned him a 250,000 Euros transfer to Jeonbuk Hyundai Motors in the South Korean K-League. His form in his inaugural K-League season earned him Player of the Year awards and has reportedly been targeted by the 2008 AFC Champion, the Japanese club Urawa Red Diamonds, for a rumored sum of 1.725 million Euros. Pohang Steelers agreed a player swap loaned with Shin Kwang-Hoon going in the opposite direction for two and a half years in 2008.

In August 2010, Ristić signed a three-year contract with Russian Premier League side Amkar Perm.

== International career ==
He elected to play and made his senior debut for Macedonia in a February 2007 friendly match against Albania in which he immediately scored and has earned a total of 17 caps, scoring 1 goal. His final international was an October 2012 FIFA World Cup qualification match against Croatia.

=== International goals ===
Results list Macedonia's goal tally first.

| Date | Venue | Opponent | Score | Result | Competition |
|---|---|---|---|---|---|
| 7 February 2007 | Tirana, Albania | Albania | 1 goal | 1-0 | Friendly |

== Personal life ==
He is married and has two kids. His wife is Macedonian.

== Honors ==
Sileks

- Macedonian League runner-up: 2003–04

Pohang Steelers

- Korean FA Cup: 2008
- League Cup: 2009
- AFC Champions League: 2009

Bunyodkor

- Uzbek Cup: 2010
