= Shin Hyung-min =

South Korean footballer (born 1986)

Shin Hyung-min 신형민
Personal information
- Full name: Shin Hyung-min
- Date of birth: 18 July 1986 (age 40)
- Place of birth: South Korea
- Height: 1.82 m (6 ft 0 in)
- Position: Defensive midfielder

Team information
- Current team: Cheonan City
- Number: 32

Youth career
- 2005–2007: Hongik University

Senior career*
Years	Team	Apps	(Gls)
2008–2012	Pohang Steelers	119	(12)
2012–2014	Al Jazira	43	(2)
2014–2020	Jeonbuk Hyundai	134	(1)
2015–2016	→ Ansan Police (army)	63	(4)
2021–2023	Ulsan Hyundai	23	(0)
2023–	Cheonan City	56	(0)

International career
2005	South Korea U20	2	(0)
2010–2013	South Korea	9	(0)
- * Club domestic league appearances and goals as of 7 January 2026

Shin Hyung-min (Korean: 신형민; Hanja: 辛炯旼; born 18 July 1986) is a South Korean football player who plays for K League 2 club Cheonan City.

== International career ==
His international career began when he played for the South Korea U-20 team. On 18 January 2010, he made his first international cap for South Korea at the friendly match against Finland.

== Career statistics ==
=== Club ===
As of match played 9 November 2024

Appearances and goals by club, season and competition
Club	Season	League			Cup		League Cup		Continental		Other		Total	
Club	Season	Division	Apps	Goals	Apps	Goals	Apps	Goals	Apps	Goals	Apps	Goals	Apps	Goals
Pohang Steelers	2008	K League 1	22	3	3	0	2	0	4	0	—		31	3
Pohang Steelers	2009	K League 1	22	4	2	0	6	0	11	0	3	0	43	4
Pohang Steelers	2010	K League 1	22	0	1	0	0	0	9	1	—		32	1
Pohang Steelers	2011	K League 1	28	4	3	0	0	0	—		—		31	4
Pohang Steelers	2012	K League 1	25	1	3	1	—		6	0	—		34	2
Pohang Steelers	Total		199	12	12	1	8	0	30	1	3	0	252	14
Al Jazira	2012–13	UAE Pro League	22	0	1	0	9	1	6	0	1	0	39	1
Al Jazira	2013–14	UAE Pro League	21	2	1	0	7	0	7	0	—		36	2
Al Jazira	Total		43	2	2	0	16	1	13	0	1	0	75	3
Jeonbuk Hyundai Motors	2014	K League 1	25	0	1	0	—		—		—		26	0
Jeonbuk Hyundai Motors	2016	K League 1	10	1	—		—		0	0	1	0	11	1
Jeonbuk Hyundai Motors	2017	K League 1	34	0	1	0	—		—		—		35	0
Jeonbuk Hyundai Motors	2018	K League 1	28	0	1	0	—		8	0	—		37	0
Jeonbuk Hyundai Motors	2019	K League 1	28	0	0	0	—		7	0	—		35	0
Jeonbuk Hyundai Motors	2020	K League 1	9	0	4	0	—		4	0	—		17	0
Jeonbuk Hyundai Motors	Total		134	1	2	0	—		19	0	1	0	156	1
Ansan Police (army)	2015	K League 2	38	4	2	0	—		—		—		40	4
Ansan Police (army)	2016	K League 2	25	0	1	0	—		—		—		26	0
Ansan Police (army)	Total		63	4	3	0	—		—		—		66	4
Ulsan Hyundai	2021	K League 1	18	0	2	0	—		7	0	2	0	29	0
Ulsan Hyundai	2022	K League 1	5	0	1	0	—		1	0	—		7	0
Ulsan Hyundai	Total		23	0	3	0	—		8	0	1	0	35	0
Cheonan City	2023	K League 2	17	0	—		—		—		—		17	0
Cheonan City	2024	K League 2	28	0	1	0	—		—		—		29	0
Cheonan City	Total		45	0	1	0	—		—		—		46	0
Career total			427	19	28	1	24	1	70	1	7	0	556	22

=== International ===
Korea Republic national team
Year	Apps	Goals
2010	6	0
2011	1	0
2012	1	0
2013	1	0
Total	9	0

== Honors ==
=== Club ===
Pohang Steelers

- Korean FA Cup (1): 2008
- K-League Cup (1): 2009
- AFC Champions League (1): 2009

Jeonbuk Hyundai Motors

- K League 1 (1): 2017
- AFC Champions League (1): 2016
