= Namkung Do =

South Korean footballer (born 1982)

Personal information
- Date of birth: June 4, 1982 (age 44)
- Place of birth: Seoul, South Korea
- Height: 1.86 m (6 ft 1 in)
- Position: Forward

Team information
- Current team: Vietnam (assistant coach)

Senior career*
Years	Team	Apps	(Gls)
2001–2005	Jeonbuk Hyundai Motors	48	(8)
2001	→ Royal Antwerp (loan)		
2005–2007	Chunnam Dragons	19	(2)
2006–2007	→ Gwangju Sangmu Bulsajo (army)	39	(9)
2008–2009	Pohang Steelers	29	(7)
2010–2012	Seongnam Ilhwa Chunma	38	(5)
2012	→ Daejeon Citizen (loan)	18	(0)
2013–2014	FC Anyang	32	(1)

International career
2003–2004	South Korea U-23	13	(0)
2004–2005	South Korea	8	(0)

Managerial career
- 2024–: Vietnam (assistant)
- * Club domestic league appearances and goals

- Namkung Do
- Hangul: 남궁도
- Hanja: 南宮道
- RR: Namgung Do
- MR: Namgung To

Namkung Do (Korean: 남궁도, born June 4, 1982) is a South Korean football manager and former player who serves as the assistant coach for the Vietnam national team.

He was part of the South Korean 2004 Olympic football team, who finished second in Group A, making it through to the next round, before being defeated by silver medal winners Paraguay.

His brother Namkung Woong is also a footballer.

== Club career ==
He played domestically for Jeonbuk Hyundai Motors, Chunnam Dragons, Gwangju Sangmu Bulsajo (while on army service), Pohang Steelers, Seongnam Ilhwa Chunma and Daejeon Citizen, as well as for Belgian club Royal Antwerp.

== Career statistics ==
As of 1 March 2012

Appearances and goals by club, season and competition
Club	Season	League			National cup (Note: Includes Korean FA Cup, Belgian Cup.)		League cup (Note: Includes K-League Cup.)		Continental		Total	
Club	Season	Division	Apps	Goals	Apps	Goals	Apps	Goals	Apps	Goals	Apps	Goals
Jeonbuk Hyundai	2001	K-League	6	0			0	0	–		6	0
Royal Antwerp	2000–01	Belgian First Division							–			
Jeonbuk Hyundai	2002	K-League	3	0			0	0	–		3	0
Jeonbuk Hyundai	2003	K-League	18	5	4	0	–		–		22	5
Jeonbuk Hyundai	2004	K-League	21	3	2	0	0	0	–		23	3
Jeonbuk Hyundai	2005	K-League	0	0	0	0	2	0			2	0
Chunnam Dragons	2005	K-League	19	2	0	0	5	0	–		24	2
Gwangju Sangmu	2006	K-League	19	2	1	0	11	2	–		31	4
Gwangju Sangmu	2007	K-League	20	7	1	1	8	2	–		29	10
Pohang Steelers	2008	K-League	24	6	3	1	1	0	3	0	31	7
Pohang Steelers	2009	K-League	5	1	0	0	0	0	5	0	10	1
Seongnam Ilhwa	2010	K-League	20	2	0	0	2	0	7	1	29	3
Seongnam Ilhwa	2011	K-League	18	3	2	1	2	0	–		22	4
Daejeon Citizen	2012	K-League										
Career total			173	31	13	3	31	4	15	1	232	39

== Honors ==
=== Vietnam ===
Assistant Manager

- ASEAN Championship: 2024, 2026

Jeonbuk Hyundai Motors

- FA Cup: 2003

Pohang Steelers

- K-League Cup: 2009
- FA Cup: 2009
- AFC Champions League: 2009

Seongnam Ilhwa Chunma

- 2010 AFC Champions League Winner
- 2011 FA Cup Winner
