= No Byung-jun =

South Korean footballer (born 1979)

Personal information
- Date of birth: 29 September 1979 (age 47)
- Place of birth: Ulsan, South Korea
- Height: 1.77 m (5 ft 10 in)
- Position: Forward

College career
Years	Team	Apps	(Gls)
1998–2001	Hanyang University		

Senior career*
Years	Team	Apps	(Gls)
2002–2005	Jeonnam Dragons	78	(12)
2006–2007	Grazer AK	8	(3)
2008–2013	Pohang Steelers	134	(25)
2010	→ Ulsan Hyundai (loan)	13	(1)
2014–2016	Daegu FC	67	(11)
Total		300	(52)

International career
1998	South Korea U20	4	(0)
2001	South Korea B		
2000–2010	South Korea	6	(1)
Medal record
Men's football
Representing South Korea
Summer Universiade
Bronze medal – third place	2001 Beijing
AFC Youth Championship
Winner	1998 Thailand
EAFF Championship
Runner-up	2010 Japan
- * Club domestic league appearances and goals

No Byung-jun (Korean: 노병준; Hanja: 盧炳俊; born 29 September 1979) is a South Korean former professional footballer who played as a striker or a winger. He was voted the Most Valuable Player of the 2009 AFC Champions League after scoring the opener with a free kick in Pohang Steelers' 2–1 final win over Al-Ittihad. At the Korean FA Cup, he is a three-time champion and the all-time top goalscorer. He scored the most goals when winning the 2012 and 2013 tournaments, although he was not an official top scorer.

== Career statistics ==
=== Club ===
Appearances and goals by club, season and competition
Club	Season	League			National cup		League cup		Continental		Other		Total	
Club	Season	Division	Apps	Goals	Apps	Goals	Apps	Goals	Apps	Goals	Apps	Goals	Apps	Goals
Jeonnam Dragons	2002	K League	0	0	?	?	5	0	—		—		5	0
Jeonnam Dragons	2003	K League	39	7	5	0	—		—		—		44	7
Jeonnam Dragons	2004	K League	20	2	3	0	8	1	—		—		31	3
Jeonnam Dragons	2005	K League	19	3	3	2	10	3	—		—		32	8
Jeonnam Dragons	Total		78	12	11	2	23	4	—		—		112	18
Grazer AK	2006–07	Austrian Bundesliga	8	3	?	?	—		—		—		8	3
Pohang Steelers	2008	K League	19	4	4	1	2	1	0	0	—		25	6
Pohang Steelers	2009	K League	22	3	2	2	5	4	12	3	3 (Note: Appearances in FIFA Club World Cup)	0	44	12
Pohang Steelers	2010	K League	3	1	0	0	3	0	5	1	—		11	2
Pohang Steelers	2011	K League	29	4	4	2	5	1	—		—		38	7
Pohang Steelers	2012	K League	35	7	4	3	—		6	0	—		45	10
Pohang Steelers	2013	K League 1	26	6	4	3	—		6	0	—		36	9
Pohang Steelers	Total		134	25	18	11	15	6	29	4	3	0	199	46
Ulsan Hyundai (loan)	2010	K League	13	1	1	0	1	0	—		—		15	1
Daegu FC	2014	K League 2	19	4	?	?	—		—		—		19	4
Daegu FC	2015	K League 2	34	7	?	?	—		—		—		34	7
Daegu FC	2016	K League 2	14	0	?	?	—		—		—		14	0
Daegu FC	Total		67	11	?	?	—		—		—		67	11
Career total			300	52	30	13	39	10	29	4	3	0	401	79

=== International ===
List of international goals scored by No Byung-jun
No.	Date	Venue	Opponent	Score	Result	Competition
1	7 February 2010	Tokyo, Japan	Hong Kong	5–0	5–0	2010 EAFF Championship

== Honours ==
Pohang Steelers

- K League 1: 2013
- Korean FA Cup: 2008, 2012, 2013
- Korean League Cup: 2009
- AFC Champions League: 2009

South Korea U20

- AFC Youth Championship: 1998

South Korea B

- Summer Universiade bronze medal: 2001

South Korea

- EAFF Championship runner-up: 2010

Individual

- AFC Champions League Most Valuable Player: 2009

Records

- Korean FA Cup all-time top goalscorer: 14 goals
