= Park Hee-chul =

South Korean footballer (born 1986)

Park Hee-Chul
Personal information
- Full name: Park Hee-Chul
- Date of birth: January 7, 1986 (age 40)
- Place of birth: South Korea
- Height: 1.78 m (5 ft 10 in)
- Position: Midfielder

Team information
- Current team: Pohang Steelers

Youth career
- Hongik University

Senior career*
Years	Team	Apps	(Gls)
2006–2007	Pohang Steelers	8	(0)
2008	Gyeongnam FC	0	(0)
2008–	Pohang Steelers	110	(0)
2015–2016	→ Ansan Police (army)	23	(0)

International career
2004–2005	South Korea U-20	23	(0)
2007	South Korea U-23	5	(0)
- * Club domestic league appearances and goals as of 11 December 2016

Park Hee-Chul (born January 7, 1986) is a South Korea football player who plays for Pohang Steelers. From January 2008 to June 2008, he was loaned to Gyeongnam FC from Pohang Steelers.

== Club career statistics ==
Club performance			League		Cup		League Cup		Continental		Total	
Season	Club	League	Apps	Goals	Apps	Goals	Apps	Goals	Apps	Goals	Apps	Goals
South Korea			League		KFA Cup		League Cup		Asia		Total	
2006	Pohang Steelers	K-League	4	0	1	0	2	0	-		7	0
2007	Pohang Steelers	K-League	4	0	0	0	2	0	-		6	0
2008	Gyeongnam FC	K-League	0	0	0	0	1	0	-		1	0
2008	Pohang Steelers	K-League	4	0	1	0	2	0	0	0	7	0
2009	Pohang Steelers	K-League	10	0	3	1	1	0	4	0	18	1
2010	Pohang Steelers	K-League	10	0	2	0	1	0	2	0	15	0
2011	Pohang Steelers	K-League	14	0	0	0	2	0	-		16	0
Total	South Korea		46	0	7	1	11	0	6	0	70	1
Career total			46	0	7	1	11	0	6	0	70	1
