= Yoo Chang-hyun =

South Korean footballer (born 1985)

Personal information
- Full name: Yoo Chang-hyun (유창현)
- Date of birth: May 14, 1985 (age 41)
- Place of birth: Hanam, Gyeongi-do, South Korea
- Height: 1.81 m (5 ft 11 in)
- Position: Forward

Team information
- Current team: Seongnam FC

Youth career
- 2004–2007: Daegu University

Senior career*
Years	Team	Apps	(Gls)
2008–2014	Pohang Steelers	72	(14)
2011–2012	→ Sangju Sangmu (army)	42	(6)
2015	Jeonbuk Hyundai	7	(2)
2016–	Seongnam FC	3	(0)
2016	→ Seoul E-Land (loan)	9	(0)
- * Club domestic league appearances and goals as of 23 November 2016

Yoo Chang-hyun (born May 14, 1985) is a South Korea football player who plays for Seongnam FC.

== Club career statistics ==
As of 31 October 2011

Club performance			League		Cup		League Cup		Continental		Total	
Season	Club	League	Apps	Goals	Apps	Goals	Apps	Goals	Apps	Goals	Apps	Goals
South Korea			League		KFA Cup		League Cup		Asia		Total	
2008	Pohang Steelers	K-League	0	0	0	0	0	0	2	0	2	0
2009	Pohang Steelers	K-League	20	7	2	0	5	4	6	0	33	11
2010	Pohang Steelers	K-League	11	2	1	0	4	0	4	0	20	2
2011	Sangju Sangmu Phoenix	K-League	17	2	1	0	3	0	—		21	2
Career total			48	11	4	0	12	4	12	0	76	15
