= 2014 Gangwon FC season =

Gangwon FC
2014 season
- Chairman: Gangwon provincial governor
- Manager: Park Hyo-jin (caretaker)
- K League Challenge: 3rd
- Korean FA Cup: Quarterfinal
- Top goalscorer: League: Choi Jin-Ho (13); All: Choi Jin-Ho (14)
- Highest home attendance: 3,556 vs Anyang (November 9)
- Lowest home attendance: 217 vs Daegu (September 17)
- Average home league attendance: 916
Home colours	Away colours

The 2014 season is Gangwon FC's sixth season in the K League and first ever season in the K League Challenge in South Korea. Gangwon FC is competing in K League Challenge and Korean FA Cup.

== Current squad ==
Note: Flags indicate national team as defined under FIFA eligibility rules; some limited exceptions apply. Players may hold more than one non-FIFA nationality.

No.	Pos.	Nation	Player
1	GK	KOR	Hwang Kyo-chung
2	DF	KOR	Choi Woo-jae
3	DF	KOR	Lee Jae-hun
4	DF	KOR	Jeong Woo-in
5	DF	KOR	Bae Hyo-sung
6	DF	KOR	Lee Chang-yong
7	MF	KOR	Lee Woo-hyeok
9	FW	KOR	Kim Young-hoo
10	FW	KOR	Choi Jin-ho
11	FW	KOR	Choi Seung-in
13	DF	KOR	Park Sang-jin
15	FW	KOR	Kim Yun-ho
17	MF	KOR	Seo Bo-min
19	FW	KOR	Kim Dong-ki
20	DF	KOR	Kim Oh-gyu
21	GK	KOR	Yang Dong-won
22	MF	KOR	Lee Jong-in

No.	Pos.	Nation	Player
23	GK	KOR	Kang Sung-kwan
24	MF	KOR	Kwon Soon-yong
25	MF	KOR	Han Seok-jong
26	MF	KOR	Kim Hyo-jin
27	DF	KOR	Park Dae-han
28	MF	KOR	Choi In-hoo
30	DF	KOR	Jung Heon-sik
31	GK	KOR	Hong Sang-jun
32	FW	KOR	Jeong Chan-il (on loan from Ulsan)
77	MF	KOR	Baek Jong-hwan
88	FW	BRA	Alex
89	FW	KOR	Chang Hyuk-jin
90	FW	BRA	Almir (on loan from Ulsan)
91	DF	TLS	Diogo Rangel
92	DF	KOR	Cho Min-woo (on loan from Seoul)
99	FW	BRA	Joélson

=== Out on loan ===
Note: Flags indicate national team as defined under FIFA eligibility rules; some limited exceptions apply. Players may hold more than one non-FIFA nationality.

No. / Pos. / Nation / Player; — / GK / KOR / Kim Keun-Bae (to Sangju Sangmu for military service)	No. / Pos. / Nation / Player; — / MF / ROU / Ciprian Vasilache (to Chungju Hummel)

== Transfer ==
=== 2013–14 Winter ===
In:

No.	Pos.	Nation	Player
—	MF	KOR	Han Seok-jong (from Soongsil University)
—	MF	KOR	Seo Bo-min (from Kwandong University)
—	DF	KOR	Park Dae-han (from Sungkyunkwan University)
—	MF	KOR	Choi In-hoo (from Dongbuk High School)
—	GK	KOR	Hwang Kyo-chung (free agent, former Pohang Steelers)
—	GK	KOR	Hong Sang-jun (free agent, former Daejeon Citizen)
—	FW	BRA	Joélson (from (Brazil) Porto)
—	GK	KOR	Yang Dong-won (free agent, former Suwon Samsung Bluewings)
—	GK	KOR	Kang Sung-kwan (from Seongnam FC)
—	DF	KOR	Jeong Woo-in (from Gwangju FC)
—	MF	KOR	Kwon Soon-yong (from Jeonbuk Hyundai Motors)
—	DF	KOR	Jung Heon-sik (from Hanyang University)
—	MF	ROU	Ciprian Vasilache (from (Ukraine) Vorskla Poltava)

Out:

No.	Pos.	Nation	Player
1	GK	KOR	Park Ho-jin (free agent)
3	DF	AUS	Brendan Hamill (loan return to Seongnam FC)
4	DF	KOR	Park Min (to FC Anyang)
6	MF	KOR	Jin Kyung-sun (free agent)
7	FW	KOR	Kang Jung-hun (loan return to FC Seoul)
8	DF	KOR	Chun Jae-ho (free agent)
9	FW	BRA	Wesley (loan return to (Brazil) Atlético Mineiro)
14	DF	KOR	Kim Jin-hwan (to Incheon United FC)
15	DF	KOR	Namgung Woong (free agent)
17	MF	KOR	Moon Byung-woo (to Daejeon Korail FC)
21	MF	KOR	Kim Keun-bae (to Sangju Sangmu, military service)
27	MF	KOR	Kim Bong-jin (to Incheon United FC)
32	FW	KOR	You Jae-won (free agent)
36	DF	KOR	Kim Young-yun (free agent)
40	MF	KOR	Lee Bong-jun (to Gangneung City FC)
42	DF	KOR	Kim Dae-San (free agent)
44	DF	KOR	Kim Dong-ho (free agent)
83	FW	ROU	Ianis Zicu (to (Romania) Petrolul Ploiești)
—	FW	KOR	Han Dong-won (free agent)
—	FW	KOR	Kim Jung-joo (to Gangneung City FC)
—	FW	KOR	Kim Eun-jung (to Daejeon Citizen)

=== 2014 Summer ===
In:

No.	Pos.	Nation	Player
—	FW	BRA	Alex (free agent, former Goyang Hi FC)
—	FW	BRA	Almir (loan from Ulsan Hyundai FC)
—	DF	TLS	Diogo Rangel (free agent, former Daejeon Citizen)
—	FW	KOR	Jeong Chan-il (loan from Ulsan Hyundai FC)
—	DF	KOR	Cho Min-woo (loan from FC Seoul)
—	MF	KOR	Baek Jong-hwan (from Sangju Sangmu)
—	FW	KOR	Chang Hyuk-jin (from Sangju Sangmu)

Out:

No.	Pos.	Nation	Player
12	MF	ROU	Ciprian Vasilache (loan to Chungju Hummel)
29	MF	KOR	Lee Jong-chan (free agent)

== Coaching staff ==
To 18 September 2014

Position	Staff
Manager	(Brazil) Arthur Bernardes
Assistant Manager	(South Korea) Bae Myung-ho
Coach	(South Korea) Park Hyo-jin
GK Coach	(South Korea) Lee Choong-ho

Last updated: 27 December 2013
Source: Gangwon FC

From 18 September 2014

Position	Staff
Coach	(South Korea) Park Hyo-jin
GK Coach	(South Korea) Lee Choong-ho

Last updated: 18 September 2014
Source: Gangwon FC

== Match results ==
=== K League Challenge ===
==== Regular season ====
All times are Korea Standard Time (KST) – UTC+9

Date Round	Home	Score	Away	Location

22 March 1	Gangwon FC	0 – 3	Ansan Police	Gangneung, Gangwon
14:00	Jung Jo-gook 3'; Yang Sang-min 76'; Ko Kyung-min 83'			Stadium: Gangneung Stadium; Attendance: 1,814; Referee: Kim Young-su

29 March 2	FC Anyang	1 – 0	Gangwon FC	Anyang, Gyeonggi
16:00	Lee Eu-ddeum 89'			Stadium: Anyang Stadium; Attendance: 6,279; Referee: Lim Won-taek

5 April 3	Gangwon FC	1 – 3	Daejeon Citizen	Wonju, Gangwon
14:00	Choi Seung-in 85'		Seo Myeong-won 45+3'; Adriano 51'; Vanderlei 84'	Stadium: Wonju Stadium; Attendance: 1,574; Referee: Kim Hee-gon

13 April 4	Bucheon FC 1995	2 – 2	Gangwon FC	Bucheon, Gyeonggi
14:00	Park Jae-chul 48'; Choi In-chang 90'		Joélson 2'; Lee Woo-hyeok 90+2'	Stadium: Bucheon Sports Complex; Attendance: 1,239; Referee: Seo Dong-jin

19 April 5	Gangwon FC	0 – 1	Daegu FC	Wonju, Gangwon
14:00			Johnathan 79'	Stadium: Wonju Stadium; Attendance: 833; Referee: Mae Ho-young

27 April 6	Gangwon FC	1 – 0	Suwon FC	Wonju, Gangwon
14:00	Kim Dong-ki 65'			Stadium: Wonju Stadium; Attendance: 987; Referee: Lim Won-taek

5 May 7	Chungju Hummel	1 – 3	Gangwon FC	Chungju, Chungbuk
16:00	Han Hong-kyu (yellow card) 26'		Kim Dong-ki 27', 75'; Lee Woo-hyeok 48'	Stadium: Chungju Stadium; Attendance: 1,072; Referee: Kim Dong-jin

10 May 8	Gangwon FC	2 – 1	Gwangju FC	Wonju, Gangwon
14:00	Joélson 66'; Kim Young-hoo 90+2'		Romarinho 60'	Stadium: Wonju Stadium; Attendance: 582; Referee: Kim Dae-yong

14 May 9	Goyang Hi FC	2 – 3	Gangwon FC	Goyang, Gyeonggi
19:00	Joo Min-kyu 15'; Alex 25' (pen.)		Choi Jin-ho 27', 72', 73'	Stadium: Goyang Stadium; Attendance: 426; Referee: Jeong Dong-sik

18 May 10	Daegu FC	2 – 0	Gangwon FC	Suseong-gu, Daegu
14:00	Hwang Soon-min 6'; Cho Hyung-ik 83'			Stadium: Daegu Stadium; Attendance: 973; Referee: Kim Young-su

25 May 11	Gangwon FC	5 – 2	Chungju Hummel	Chuncheon, Gangwon
19:00	Kim Young-hoo 32'; Choi Jin-ho 39', 44', 59'; Joélson 52'		Han Hong-kyu 45+2'; Lee Wan-hee 65'	Stadium: Chuncheon Stadium; Attendance: 481; Referee: Seo Dong-jin

1 June 12	Gangwon FC	0 – 2	Bucheon FC 1995	Gangneung, Gangwon
19:00			Rodrigo 76' (pen.); Lee Je-seung 87'	Stadium: Gangneung Stadium; Attendance: 3,066; Referee: Mae Ho-young

8 June 13	Gwangju FC	1 – 1	Gangwon FC	Seo-gu, Gwangju
19:00	Kim Ho-nam 62'		Seo Bo-min 90+4'	Stadium: Gwangju World Cup Stadium; Attendance: 1,594; Referee: Lim Won-taek

15 June 14	Gangwon FC	3 – 1	Ansan Police	Gangneung, Gangwon
19:00	Joélson 47', 64', 83' (pen.)		Oh Beom-seok 74'	Stadium: Gangneung Stadium; Attendance: 682; Referee: Kim Hee-gon

22 June 15	Gangwon FC	0 – 0	FC Anyang	Chuncheon, Gangwon
19:00				Stadium: Chuncheon Stadium; Attendance: 525; Referee: Kim Sang-woo

29 June 16	Suwon FC	1 – 1	Gangwon FC	Gangneung, Gangwon
19:00	Cho Yong-min 90+4'		Choi Jin-ho 46'	Stadium: Gangneung Stadium; Attendance: 936; Referee: Choi Myung-yong

6 July 17	Daejeon Citizen	2 – 2	Gangwon FC	Yuseong-gu, Daejeon
19:00	Ahn Young-gyu 2'; Kim Chan-hee 66'		Alex 27'; Almir 33'	Stadium: Daejeon World Cup Stadium; Attendance: 2,519; Referee: Lee Min-hoo

12 July 18	Gangwon FC	0 – 1	Goyang Hi FC	Chuncheon, Gangwon
19:00			Joo Min-kyu 15'	Stadium: Chuncheon Stadium; Attendance: 615; Referee: Jung Dong-sik

21 July 19	FC Anyang	2 – 1	Gangwon FC	Gangneung, Gangwon
19:30	Jung Jae-yong 51', 57'		Almir 84' (pen.)	Stadium: Gangneung Stadium; Attendance: 1,344; Referee: Seo Dong-jin

28 July 20	Ansan Police	1 – 3	Gangwon FC	Ansan, Gyeonggi
19:30	Ko Kyung-min 57'		Kim Dong-ki 7'; Almir 14' (pen.); Choi Jin-ho 35' (pen.)	Stadium: Ansan Wa~ Stadium; Attendance: 286; Referee: Kim Hee-gon

9 August 21	Gangwon FC	2 – 1	Suwon FC	Chuncheon, Gangwon
19:00	Alex 23'; Jeong Woo-in 40'		Kim Bon-kwang 84'	Stadium: Chuncheon Stadium; Attendance: 549; Referee: Mae Ho-young

16 August 22	Goyang Hi FC	0 – 0	Gangwon FC	Goyang, Gyeonggi
19:00				Stadium: Goyang Stadium; Attendance: 764; Referee: Lim Won-taek

23 August 23	Bucheon FC 1995	0 – 1	Gangwon FC	Bucheon, Gyeonggi
19:00			Kim Young-hoo 69'	Stadium: Bucheon Sports Complex; Attendance: 751; Referee: Kim Sang-woo

31 August 24	Gwangju FC	2 – 0	Gangwon FC	Seo-gu, Gwangju
19:00	Cho Yong-tae 68'; Kim Min-soo 82'			Stadium: Gwangju World Cup Stadium; Attendance: 989; Referee: Woo Sang-il

7 September 25	Gangwon FC	1 – 2	Daejeon Citizen	Chuncheon, Gangwon
19:00	Alex 77'		Kim Chan-hee 29'; Adriano 88'	Stadium: Chuncheon Stadium; Attendance: 471; Referee: Kim Jong-hyuk

13 September 26	Chungju Hummel	0 – 1	Gangwon FC	Chungju, Chungbuk
19:00			Lee Chang-yong 66'	Stadium: Chungju Stadium; Attendance: 1,380; Referee: (South Korea) Kim Hee-Gon

17 September 27	Gangwon FC	4 – 1	Daegu FC	Chuncheon, Gangwon
19:00	Bae Hyo-sung 21'; Choi Jin-ho 42', 50', 73' (pen.)		Hwang Soon-min 54'	Stadium: Chuncheon Stadium; Attendance: 217; Referee: Kim Seong-ho

21 September 28	Gangwon FC	2 – 4	Gwangju FC	Chuncheon, Gangwon
14:00	Choi Jin-ho 5'; Kim Oh-gyu 12'		Kim Ho-nam 48'; Fábio 55', 66' (pen.); Cho Yong-tae 74'	Stadium: Chuncheon Stadium; Attendance: 428; Referee: Park Byung-jin

27 September 29	Gangwon FC	2 – 0	Bucheon FC 1995	Wonju, Gangwon
14:00	Kim Young-hoo 16'; Choi Seung-in 73'			Stadium: Wonju Stadium; Attendance: 564; Referee: Kim Young-su

5 October 30	Gangwon FC	1 – 0	Chungju Hummel	Wonju, Gangwon
14:00	Seo Bo-min 87'			Stadium: Wonju Stadium; Attendance: 529; Referee: Kim Hee-gon

12 October 31	Daejeon Citizen	3 – 0	Gangwon FC	Jung-gu, Daejeon
14:00	Jeong Seok-min 44'; Adriano 47', 86'			Stadium: Daejeon Hanbat Sports Complex; Attendance: 1,527; Referee: Kim Dae-yong

18 October 32	Gangwon FC	1 – 0	Goyang Hi FC	Wonju, Gangwon
14:00	Bae Hyo-sung 47'			Stadium: Wonju Stadium; Attendance: 671; Referee: Lim Won-taek

25 October 33	Ansan Police	1 – 0	Gangwon FC	Ansan, Gyeonggi
14:00	Seo Dong-hyun 32'			Stadium: Ansan Wa~ Stadium; Attendance: 480; Referee: Mae Ho-young

2 November 34	Daegu FC	6 – 1	Gangwon FC	Suseong-gu, Daegu
14:00	Johnathan 25', 41', 54', 71'; No Byung-jun 51', 57'		Alex 73'	Stadium: Daegu Stadium; Attendance: 794; Referee: Seo Dong-jin

9 November 35	Gangwon FC	2 – 0	FC Anyang	Wonju, Gangwon
14:00	Alex 19' (pen.); Seo Bo-min 85'			Stadium: Wonju Stadium; Attendance: 3,556; Referee: Song Min-Seok

16 November 36	Suwon FC	1 – 2	Gangwon FC	Suwon, Gyeonggi
14:00	Kim Han-won 76' (pen.)		Choi Woo-jae 56'; Choi Jin-ho 63'	Stadium: Suwon World Cup Stadium; Attendance: 1,191; Referee: Ko Hyun-jin

==== League table ====
Pos	Team	Pld	W	D	L	GF	GA	GD	Pts	Qualification
1	Daejeon Citizen (C, P)	36	20	10	6	64	36	+28	70	Promotion to the K League Classic
2	Ansan Police	36	16	11	9	58	48	+10	59	Qualification for the promotion playoffs semi-final
3	Gangwon FC	36	16	6	14	48	50	−2	54	Qualification for the promotion playoffs first round
4	Gwangju FC (O, P)	36	13	12	11	40	35	+5	51	Qualification for the promotion playoffs first round
5	FC Anyang	36	15	6	15	49	52	−3	51	

Source: K League
Rules for classification: 1) Points; 2) Goal difference; 3) Goals scored.
(C) Champions; (O) Play-off winners; (P) Promoted

==== Results summary ====
Overall								Home						Away					
Pld	W	D	L	GF	GA	GD	Pts	W	D	L	GF	GA	GD	W	D	L	GF	GA	GD
36	16	6	14	48	50	−2	54	10	1	7	27	22	+5	6	5	7	21	28	−7

==== Results by round ====
Round	1	2	3	4	5	6	7	8	9	10	11	12	13	14	15	16	17	18	19	20	21	22	23	24	25	26	27	28	29	30	31	32	33	34	35	36
Ground	H	A	H	A	H	H	A	H	A	A	H	H	A	H	H	A	A	H	A	A	H	A	A	A	H	A	H	H	H	H	A	H	A	A	H	A
Result	L	L	L	D	L	W	W	W	W	L	W	L	D	W	D	D	D	L	L	W	W	D	W	L	L	W	W	L	W	W	L	W	L	L	W	W
Position	10	10	10	10	10	9	8	7	3	3	2	4	4	4	4	3	4	4	7	3	3	5	3	5	5	4	3	5	3	2	4	4	4	5	3	3

Updated to match(es) played on 16 November 2014. Source: League Fixtures and Results
A = Away; H = Home; W = Win; D = Draw; L = Loss

==== Relegation/Promotion Playoff ====
Round 1
Ch3	Gangwon FC	0
Ch4	Gwangju FC	1

Playoff
Ch2	Ansan Police	0
Ch4	Gwangju FC	3

Relegation/Promotion Playoffs
Cl11	Gyeongnam FC	1	1	2
Ch4	Gwangju FC	3	1	4

22 November Playoff	Gangwon FC	0 – 1	Gwangju FC	Wonju, Gangwon
14:00			Kim Ho-nam 53'	Stadium: Wonju Stadium; Attendance: 1,065; Referee: Choi Myung-yong

=== Korean FA Cup ===
9 April Round 2	Gangwon FC	3 – 2	Yongin City	Gangneung, Gangwon
19:00	Kim Oh-gyu 22'; Choi Jin-ho 37'; Kim Dong-ki 47'		Bae Hae-min 74'; Moon Kyu-hyun 82'	Stadium: Gangneung Stadium; Attendance: 394; Referee: Kim Dong-min

30 April Last 32	Gangwon FC	3 – 2 (a.e.t.)	Hongik University	Gangneung, Gangwon
15:00	Kim Young-hoo 16'; Joélson 82'; Choi Seung-in 98'		Kang Min-seong 5'; Cha Min-seung 52'	Stadium: Gangneung Stadium; Attendance: 400; Referee: Park Pil-joon

16 July Last 16	Gangwon FC	2 - 2 (a.e.t.) (3 – 2 p)	Ulsan Mipo Dolphins	Gangneung, Gangwon
16:00	Seo Bo-min 64'; Alex 81'		Jeong Woo-in 15' (o.g.); Lee Yong-jun 36'	Stadium: Gangneung Stadium; Attendance: 300; Referee: Ko Hyung-jin
	Penalties
	Kim Oh-gyu (penalty scored); Jeong Woo-in (penalty missed); Choi Seung-in (penalty scored); Seo Bo-min (penalty scored)		(penalty missed) Allisson; (penalty scored) Alex Rafael; (penalty scored) Han Geon-yong; (penalty missed) Lee Yong-jun; (penalty missed) Park Wan-sun

13 August Quarterfinal	Sangju Sangmu	1 – 1 (a.e.t.) (6 – 5 p)	Gangwon FC	Sangju, Gyeongbuk
19:30	Kwon Soon-Hyung 33'		Almir 63'	Stadium: Sangju Civic Stadium; Attendance: 754

== Squad statistics ==
=== Appearances ===
Statistics accurate as of match played 22 November 2014

No.	Nat.	Pos.	Name	League		Playoff		FA Cup		Appearances		Goals
No.	Nat.	Pos.	Name	Apps	Goals	Apps	Goals	Apps	Goals	App (sub)	Total	Goals
1	(South Korea)	GK	Hwang Kyo-chung	19	0	1	0	2	0	22 (0)	22	0
2	(South Korea)	DF	Choi Woo-jae	9 (5)	1	1	0	0 (1)	0	10 (6)	16	1
3	(South Korea)	DF	Lee Jae-hun	32 (1)	0	1	0	4	0	37 (1)	38	0
4	(South Korea)	DF	Jeong Woo-in	25 (2)	1	1	0	3 (1)	0	29 (3)	32	1
5	(South Korea)	DF	Bae Hyo-sung	25 (2)	2	0	0	3	0	28 (2)	30	2
6	(South Korea)	DF	Lee Chang-yong	19 (3)	1	0	0	2	0	21 (3)	24	1
7	(South Korea)	MF	Lee Woo-hyeok	29 (1)	2	0	0	4	0	33 (1)	34	2
9	(South Korea)	FW	Kim Young-hoo	12 (10)	4	0 (1)	0	1 (1)	1	13 (12)	25	5
10	(South Korea)	FW	Choi Jin-ho	31 (1)	13	1	0	3	1	35 (1)	36	14
11	(South Korea)	FW	Choi Seung-in	5 (16)	2	0	0	0 (3)	1	5 (19)	24	3
13	(South Korea)	DF	Park Sang-jin	4	0	0	0	1	0	5 (0)	5	0
15	(South Korea)	FW	Kim Yun-ho	15 (9)	0	0	0	1 (1)	0	16 (10)	26	0
17	(South Korea)	MF	Seo Bo-min	10 (20)	3	1	0	0 (3)	1	11 (23)	34	4
19	(South Korea)	FW	Kim Dong-ki	18 (9)	4	0	0	3 (1)	1	21 (10)	31	5
20	(South Korea)	MF	Kim Oh-gyu	30	1	1	0	4	1	35 (0)	35	2
21	(South Korea)	GK	Yang Dong-won	16	0	0	0	2	0	18 (0)	18	0
22	(South Korea)	MF	Lee Jong-in	0 (2)	0	0	0	0	0	0 (2)	2	0
23	(South Korea)	GK	Kang Sung-kwan	1	0	0	0	0	0	1 (0)	1	0
24	(South Korea)	MF	Kwon Soon-yong	0	0	0	0	0	0	0	0	0
25	(South Korea)	MF	Han Seok-jong	18 (3)	0	0	0	2 (1)	0	20 (4)	24	0
26	(South Korea)	MF	Kim Hyo-jin	0	0	0	0	0	0	0	0	0
27	(South Korea)	DF	Park Dae-han	3	0	0	0	0	0	3 (0)	3	0
28	(South Korea)	MF	Choi In-hoo	0	0	0	0	0	0	0	0	0
30	(South Korea)	DF	Jung Heon-sik	11 (1)	0	0	0	1	0	12 (1)	13	0
31	(South Korea)	GK	Hong Sang-jun	0	0	0	0	0	0	0	0	0
32	(South Korea)	FW	Jeong Chan-il	5 (1)	0	1	0	0	0	6 (1)	7	0
77	(South Korea)	MF	Baek Jong-hwan	8	0	1	0	0	0	9 (0)	9	0
88	(Brazil)	FW	Alex	11 (3)	5	1	0	2	1	14 (3)	17	6
89	(South Korea)	DF	Chang Hyuk-jin	7 (1)	0	1	0	0	0	8 (1)	9	0
90	(Brazil)	FW	Almir	9 (2)	3	0 (1)	0	2	1	11 (3)	14	4
91	(Timor-Leste)	DF	Diogo Rangel	0 (1)	0	0	0	0	0	0 (1)	1	0
92	(South Korea)	DF	Cho Min-woo	1 (1)	0	0 (1)	0	0	0	1 (2)	3	0
99	(Brazil)	FW	Joélson	16 (3)	6	0	0	2 (2)	1	18 (5)	23	7
12	(Romania)	FW	Ciprian Vasilache (loan out)	7 (6)	0	0	0	2	0	9 (6)	15	0
16	(South Korea)	MF	Lee Jun-yeob (out)	0 (1)	0	0	0	0	0	0 (1)	1	0
29	(South Korea)	MF	Lee Jong-chan (out)	0	0	0	0	0	0	0	0	0

=== Goals and assists ===
Rank	Nation	Number	Name	League		KFA Cup		Sum		Total
Rank	Nation	Number	Name	Goals	Assists	Goals	Assists	Goals	Assists	Total
1	(South Korea)	10	Choi Jin-ho	13	9	1	0	14	9	23
2	(Brazil)	99	Joélson	6	0	1	0	7	0	7
=	(Brazil)	88	Alex	5	1	1	0	6	1	7
=	(South Korea)	9	Kim Young-hoo	4	1	1	1	5	2	7
=	(South Korea)	7	Lee Woo-hyeok	2	5	0	0	2	5	7
3	(South Korea)	19	Kim Dong-ki	4	0	1	0	5	0	5
=	(South Korea)	17	Seo Bo-min	3	1	1	0	4	1	5
=	(Brazil)	90	Almir	3	0	1	1	4	1	5
=	(South Korea)	11	Choi Seung-in	2	2	1	0	3	2	5
4	(South Korea)	20	Kim Oh-gyu	1	0	1	1	2	1	3
=	(South Korea)	3	Lee Jae-hun	0	3	0	0	0	3	3
5	(South Korea)	5	Bae Hyo-sung	2	0	0	0	2	0	2
=	(South Korea)	4	Jeong Woo-in	1	1	0	0	1	1	2
=	(South Korea)	6	Lee Chang-yong	1	1	0	0	1	1	2
=	(South Korea)	15	Kim Yun-ho	0	2	0	0	0	2	2
=	(South Korea)	89	Chang Hyuk-jin	0	2	0	0	0	2	2
6	(South Korea)	2	Choi Woo-jae	1	0	0	0	1	0	1
=	(Romania)	12	Ciprian Vasilache	0	1	0	0	0	1	1
=	(South Korea)	25	Han Seok-jong	0	1	0	0	0	1	1
=	(South Korea)	32	Jeong Chan-il	0	1	0	0	0	1	1
/	/	/	TOTALS	48	31	9	3	57	34	

=== Discipline ===
Position	Nation	Number	Name	League		KFA Cup		Total	
Position	Nation	Number	Name	Yellow card	Red card	Yellow card	Red card	Yellow card	Red card
GK	(South Korea)	1	Hwang Kyo-chung	3	0	0	0	3	0
DF	(South Korea)	2	Choi Woo-jae	3	0	0	0	3	0
DF	(South Korea)	3	Lee Jae-hun	3	0	1	0	4	0
DF	(South Korea)	4	Jeong Woo-in	6	0	0	0	6	0
DF	(South Korea)	5	Bae Hyo-Sung	9	1	0	0	9	1
DF	(South Korea)	6	Lee Chang-yong	3	1	2	0	5	1
FW	(South Korea)	9	Kim Young-hoo	3	1	0	0	3	1
FW	(South Korea)	10	Choi Jin-ho	1	0	0	0	1	0
FW	(South Korea)	11	Choi Seung-in	1	0	0	0	1	0
FW	(Romania)	12	Ciprian Vasilache	2	0	0	0	2	0
DF	(South Korea)	13	Park Sang-Jin	2	0	0	0	2	0
FW	(South Korea)	15	Kim Yun-ho	5	0	0	0	5	0
MF	(South Korea)	17	Seo Bo-min	1	0	0	0	1	0
FW	(South Korea)	19	Kim Dong-ki	6	0	2	0	8	0
DF	(South Korea)	20	Kim Oh-gyu	6	0	2	0	8	0
MF	(South Korea)	25	Han Seok-jong	2	0	2	0	4	0
DF	(South Korea)	30	Jung Heon-sik	4	0	0	0	4	0
FW	(South Korea)	32	Jeong Chan-il	1	0	0	0	1	0
MF	(South Korea)	77	Baek Jong-hwan	2	0	0	0	2	0
FW	(Brazil)	88	Alex	1	0	1	0	2	0
FW	(South Korea)	89	Chang Hyuk-jin	1	0	0	0	1	0
FW	(Brazil)	90	Almir	1	0	1	0	2	0
/	/	/	TOTALS	66	3	11	0	77	3
