= 2014 Korean FA Cup =

2014 Hana Bank FA Cup

Tournament details
- Country: South Korea
- Teams: 72

Final positions
- Champions: Seongnam FC (3rd title)
- Runners-up: FC Seoul

Tournament statistics
- Matches played: 71
- Goals scored: 213 (3 per match)
- Top goal scorer: Kaio (4 goals)

Awards
- Best player: Park Jun-hyuk

The 2014 Korean FA Cup, known as the 2014 Hana Bank FA Cup, was the 19th edition of the Korean FA Cup. In 2013, South Korea's Ministry of Employment and Labor hosted the National Works Club Championship for the first time, and gave qualifications for the 2014 Korean FA Cup to its top four teams. Seongnam FC became champions and qualified for the 2015 AFC Champions League.

== Schedule ==
Round	Date	Matches	Clubs remaining	Clubs involved	New entries this round
First round	22–23 March	20	72	40	20 university teams 16 Challengers League teams 4 National Works Club Championship teams
Second round	5–9 April	20	52	20+20	10 K League Challenge teams 10 Korea National League teams
Round of 32	30 April – 21 May	16	32	20+12	12 K League Classic teams
Round of 16	11–16 July	8	16	16	None
Quarter-finals	13 August	4	8	8	None
Semi-finals	22 October	2	4	4	None
Final	23 November	1	2	2	None

== Teams ==
Entry round	Participating teams	
Round of 32	K League Classic All 12 teams of the 2014 season	
Round of 32	Busan IPark; Gyeongnam FC; Incheon United; Jeju United; Jeonbuk Hyundai Motors; Jeonnam Dragons; Pohang Steelers; Sangju Sangmu; Seongnam FC; FC Seoul; Suwon Samsung Bluewings; Ulsan Hyundai	
Second round	K League Challenge All 10 teams of the 2014 season	Korea National League All 10 teams of the 2014 season
Second round	Ansan Police; FC Anyang; Bucheon FC 1995; Chungju Hummel; Daegu FC; Daejeon Citizen; Gangwon FC; Goyang Hi FC; Gwangju FC; Suwon FC	Busan Transportation Corporation; Changwon City; Cheonan City; Daejeon Korail; Gangneung City; Daejeon Korail; Gyeongju KHNP; Mokpo City; Hyundai Mipo Dockyard; Yongin City
First round	University teams 20 teams	Challengers League Top 16 teams of the 2013 season
First round	Ajou University; Chosun University; Dankook University; Dong-a University; Dong-Eui University; Dongguk University; Gwangju University; Hannam University; Hanyang University; Honam University; Hongik University; Incheon National University; Inje University; Konkuk University; Korea University; Kyung Hee University; Sangji University; Soongsil University; Sungkyunkwan University; Yeungnam University	Cheonan FC; Chungbuk Cheongju; Chuncheon FC; Gimpo Citizen; Gwangju Gwangsan; Gyeongju Citizen; Hwaseong FC; Icheon Citizen; Jeonju Citizen; Yeonggwang FC; Jungnang Chorus Mustang; Paju Citizen; FC Pocheon; Seoul FC Martyrs; Seoul United; Yangju Citizen
First round	Ajou University; Chosun University; Dankook University; Dong-a University; Dong-Eui University; Dongguk University; Gwangju University; Hannam University; Hanyang University; Honam University; Hongik University; Incheon National University; Inje University; Konkuk University; Korea University; Kyung Hee University; Sangji University; Soongsil University; Sungkyunkwan University; Yeungnam University	National Works Club Championship Top 4 teams of the 2013 season
First round	Ajou University; Chosun University; Dankook University; Dong-a University; Dong-Eui University; Dongguk University; Gwangju University; Hannam University; Hanyang University; Honam University; Hongik University; Incheon National University; Inje University; Konkuk University; Korea University; Kyung Hee University; Sangji University; Soongsil University; Sungkyunkwan University; Yeungnam University	DSME; Nexen Tire; Samsung Electronics; SMC Engineering

== Qualifying rounds ==
=== First round ===
The draw for the first round was held on 28 February 2014.

22 March 2014	Seoul United	0–1 (a.e.t.)	Sangji University	Madeul Stadium, Seoul
14:00			Ju Chan-hee 106'	Attendance: 300

22 March 2014	Icheon Citizen	2–3	Hannam University	Icheon City Stadium, Icheon
14:00	Kim Hyun-woo 15', 28'		Kim Min-joon 36'; Jo Woo-jin 39'; Bang Chan-joon 65'	Attendance: 300

22 March 2014	Cheonan FC	1–2 (a.e.t.)	Dong-Eui University	Cheonan Football Center, Cheonan
14:00	Park Seong-hyup 94'		Kwak Seong-hwan 105'; Jang Hak-jae 113'	Attendance: 500

22 March 2014	FC Pocheon	4–0	Inje University	Pocheon Stadium, Pocheon
15:00	Jang Seung-su 33' (o.g.); Jung Dae-hwan 65', 85'; Kim Joon-tae 71'			Attendance: 1,000

23 March 2014	SMC Engineering	2–3	Gwangju University	Gimcheon Stadium, Gimcheon
12:00	Kim Su-won 53'; Kim Min-goo 90+2'		Kim Dae-hyup 42'; Kim Tae-hoon 66'; Go Yeong-ji 81'	Attendance: 100

23 March 2014	Hanyang University	4–2	Samsung Electronics	Gumi Civic Stadium, Gumi
12:00	Lee Sang-cheol 5'; Lim Chan-wool 12', 61'; Kwon Jung-hyun 78'		Kang Joon-hyun 63'; Kim Dong-hyuk 80'	Attendance: 200

23 March 2014	Yangju Citizen	2–1	Dong-a University	Yangju Godeok Stadium, Yangju
15:00	Lee Tae-young 66'; Shin Min-soo 83'		Seo Hyung-seung 47'	Attendance: 300

23 March 2014	Hwaseong FC	2–1	Dongguk University	Hwaseong Auxiliary Stadium, Hwaseong
14:00	Kim Chang-hee 47'; Kim Hyung-pil 65'		Ahn Su-min 69'	Attendance: 1,000

23 March 2014	Soongsil University	1–0	Nexen Tire	Soongsil University, Seoul
08:00	Min Hyun-hong 35'			Attendance: 200

23 March 2014	Paju Citizen	0–3	Hongik University	Paju Public Stadium, Paju
14:00			Kang Min-seong 43'; Ahn Tae-hyun 66'; Jeong Jae-hyuk 90'	Attendance: 230

23 March 2014	Kyung Hee University	12–1	Seoul FC Martyrs	Yongin Football Center, Yongin
14:00	Ko Seung-beom 8', 69'; Kim Jeong-se 24'; Baek Seung-hoon 42'; Lee Keon-cheol 55', 87'; Choi Dong-seop 64', 76'; Yoo Dong-won 72'; Park In-hyuk 82', 89'; Lee Sang-ha 90'		Park Keun-ho 30'	Attendance: 70

23 March 2014	Konkuk University	6–1	DSME	Gimcheon Stadium, Gimcheon
14:00	Kim Kyung-yeon 21', 24', 40'; Myung Dae-hoon 47'; Kim Jae-seok 75'; Kim Woon 79'		Choi Byung-su 61'	Attendance: 100

23 March 2014	Jungnang Chorus Mustang	2–1	Korea University	Jungnang Sport Center, Seoul
14:00	Kim Sung-hyun 65'; Heo Jae-won 90'		Heo Yong-joon 48'	Attendance: 400

23 March 2014	Jeonju Citizen	0–3	Dankook University	Jeonju University, Jeonju
14:00			Lee In-jae 19'; Bae Sin-yeong 58'; Wang Keon-myeong 74'	Attendance: 160

23 March 2014	Incheon National University	1–1 (a.e.t.) (5–4 p)	Gwangju Gwangsan	Incheon University, Incheon
14:00	Lim Jeong-bin 68'		Song Kyung-ha 88'	Attendance: 240
	Penalties
	Ryu Yeon-jae (penalty scored); Kim Jae-pyo (penalty scored); Lim Jeong-bin (penalty missed); Lee Joon-hee (penalty scored); Choi Se-hwan (penalty scored); Yoon Ju-yeol (penalty scored)		(penalty scored) Park Jong-beom; (penalty scored) Song Kyung-ha; (penalty missed) Lee Dae-eun; (penalty scored) Kim Bo-gook; (penalty scored) Kim Hyung-rok; (penalty missed) Kim Kyung-hwan

23 March 2014	Honam University	0–1 (a.e.t.)	Chuncheon FC	Honam University, Gwangju
14:00			Heo Jin-gu 115'	Attendance: 200

23 March 2014	Gyeongju Citizen	0–1	Sungkyunkwan University	Gyeongju Civic Stadium, Gyeongju
14:00			Choi Yeong-hyo 32'	Attendance: 250

23 March 2014	Yeungnam University	3–1	Gimpo Citizen	Yeungnam University, Daegu
14:00	Choi Kwang-su 4'; Kim Yoon-su 20'; Jang Soon-kyu 74'		Lee Jong-min 58'	Attendance: 100

23 March 2014	Yeonggwang FC	0–1	Ajou University	Yeonggwang Sportium, Yeonggwang
14:00			Lee Jae-min 83'	Attendance: 300

23 March 2014	Chungbuk Cheongju	0–2	Chosun University	Yongjeong Football Center, Cheongju
14:00			Park Jae-min 19'; Kim Ho-kyu 47'	Attendance: 550

=== Second round ===
The draw for the second round was held on 26 March 2014.

5 April 2014	Kyung Hee University	0–2	Soongsil University	Yongin Football Center, Yongin
14:00			Kim Jin-hyuk 65'; Eun Seong-su 74'	Attendance: 200

5 April 2014	Incheon National University	1–2	Yeungnam University	Incheon National University, Incheon
14:00	Yoon Ju-yeol 77'		Jang Soon-kyu 54'; Jeong Won-jin 74'	Attendance: 130

5 April 2014	Changwon City	2–0	Hanyang University	Changwon Civic Stadium, Changwon
15:00	Kwon Si-baek 22'; Choi Kwon-su 89'			Attendance: 200

5 April 2014	Daejeon Korail	2–1	Konkuk University	Hanbat Sports Complex, Daejeon
14:00	Kim Tae-wook 4'; Moon Byung-woo 90'		Han Ji-won 50'	Attendance: 200

5 April 2014	Gangneung City	1–1 (a.e.t.) (4–1 p)	Busan Transportation Corporation	Gangneung Stadium, Gangneung
15:00	Lee Haeng-su 105'		Lee Yong-seung 108'	Attendance: 850

5 April 2014	Hannam University	3–1	Chosun University	Hannam University, Daejeon
14:00	Yeo In-eon 40'; Kim Dong-min 43'; Jo Woo-jin 64'		Ahn Su-hyun 50'	Attendance: 100

5 April 2014	Cheonan City	3–2 (a.e.t.)	Yangju Citizen	Cheonan Football Center, Cheonan
15:00	Jeong Woo-jae 16'; Lee Seung-woo 90+3'; Son Dae-sung 107'		Jo E-rok 5'; Shin Min-soo 48'	Attendance: 200

5 April 2014	Hyundai Mipo Dockyard	2–1	Gimhae FC	Ulsan Stadium, Ulsan
15:00	Hwang Cheol-hwan 7', 26'		Ku Hyun-Seo 71'	Attendance: 150

5 April 2014	Chuncheon FC	0–1	FC Pocheon	Chuncheon Stadium, Chuncheon
15:00			Lee Sang-yong 20'	Attendance: 150

5 April 2014	Jungnang Chorus Mustang	2–1	Gwangju University	Jungnang Sport Center, Seoul
15:00	Lim Jang-won 40'; Yoon Byung-kwon 82' (o.g.)		Lee Je-gil 78'	Attendance: 280

5 April 2014	Dankook University	0–1	Hongik University	Gimcheon Stadium, Gimcheon
14:00			Jeong Jae-hyuk 66'	Attendance: 300

9 April 2014	Bucheon FC 1995	4–0	Sangji University	Bucheon Sports Complex, Bucheon
20:00	Kim Tae-young 30', 41'; Rodrigo Paraná 47', 88'			Attendance: 424

9 April 2014	Mokpo City	1–2	Daejeon Citizen	Mokpo International Football Center, Mokpo
19:00	Jung Soo-bin 2'		Kim Chan-hee 49'; Kim Young-seung 55'	Attendance: 300

9 April 2014	FC Anyang	2–0	Sungkyunkwan University	Anyang Sports Complex, Anyang
19:00	Kim Jae-woong 32'; Baek Dong-kyu 81'			Attendance: 1,700

9 April 2014	Gwangju FC	2–1 (a.e.t.)	Goyang Hi FC	Gwangju World Cup Stadium, Gwangju
19:00	Romarinho 100'; Song Seung-min 116'		Alex 111'	Attendance: 300

9 April 2014	Chungju Hummel	2–2 (a.e.t.) (2–4 p)	Ajou University	Chungju Stadium, Chungju
19:00	Han Hong-kyu 105'; Kim Sung-min 53'		Jo Ju-yeong 29'; Kang Tae-woong 67'	Attendance: 600

9 April 2014	Suwon FC	4–3	Hwaseong FC	Suwon Sports Complex, Suwon
19:00	Ha Jung-heon 8', 53'; Kim Bon-kwang 25'; Jung Min-woo 90'		Jeon Bo-hoon 27'; Kim Dong-wook 49'; Kim Hyo-ki 64'	Attendance: 260

9 April 2014	Gangwon FC	3–2	Yongin City	Gangneung Stadium, Gangneung
19:00	Kim Oh-gyu 22'; Choi Jin-ho 37'; Kim Dong-ki 47'		Bae Hae-min 74'; Moon Kyu-hyun 82'	Attendance: 394

9 April 2014	Daegu FC	3–0	Dong-Eui University	Daegu Stadium, Daegu
19:00	Yoon Young-seung 54'; Shin Chang-mu 71'; Han Seung-yeop 77'			Attendance: 308

9 April 2014	Ansan Police	2–2 (a.e.t.) (2–4 p)	Gyeongju KHNP	Ansan Wa~ Stadium, Ansan
19:00	Jo Jae-cheol 7'; An Sung-bin 38'		Kim Young-nam 28', 64'	Attendance: 404
	Penalties
	Kim Byung-suk (penalty missed); Yang Sang-min (penalty missed) ? (penalty scored) ? (penalty scored)		(penalty scored) ? (penalty scored) ? (penalty scored) ? (penalty scored) ?

== Final rounds ==
=== Bracket ===
Round of 32
Busan IPark (p)	1 (5)
Jungnang Chorus Mustang	1 (3)
Jeju United	3 (4)
Suwon FC (p)	3 (5)
FC Seoul (a.e.t.)	3
Incheon United	2
Pohang Steelers (a.e.t.)	0 (4)
FC Anyang	0 (3)
Cheonan City (a.e.t.)	1
Hannam University	0
Suwon Samsung Bluewings	0 (3)
Sangju Sangmu (p)	0 (4)
Gangwon FC (a.e.t.)	3
Hongik University	2
Hyundai Mipo Dockyard (p)	1 (5)
Gyeongju KHNP	1 (4)
Ulsan Hyundai	3
Soongsil University	1
Jeonbuk Hyundai Motors	3
Jeonnam Dragons	1
Gyeongnam FC	1
Gangneung City	2
Daejeon Citizen	1
FC Pocheon	2
Seongnam FC	1
Daegu FC	0
Gwangju FC	1
Bucheon FC 1995	0
Daejeon Korail (a.e.t.)	1
Changwon City	0
Ajou University	1
Yeungnam University	2

Round of 16
Busan IPark (a.e.t.)	3
Suwon FC	2
FC Seoul (p)	2 (4)
Pohang Steelers	2 (2)
Cheonan City	0
Sangju Sangmu	1
Gangwon FC (p)	2 (3)
Hyundai Mipo Dockyard	2 (2)
Ulsan Hyundai	1
Jeonbuk Hyundai Motors	2
Gangneung City	1
FC Pocheon	0
Seongnam FC (a.e.t.)	2
Gwangju FC	1
Daejeon Korail	1 (4)
Yeungnam University (p)	1 (5)

Quarter-finals
Busan IPark	1
FC Seoul (a.e.t.)	2
Sangju Sangmu (p)	1 (6)
Gangwon FC	1 (5)
Jeonbuk Hyundai Motors	3
Gangneung City	2
Seongnam FC	2
Yeungnam University	1

Semi-finals
22 October – Sangju
FC Seoul	1
Sangju Sangmu	0
22 October – Jeonju
Jeonbuk Hyundai Motors	0 (4)
Seongnam FC (p)	0 (5)

Final
23 November – Seoul
FC Seoul	0 (2)
Seongnam FC (p)	0 (4)

=== Round of 32 ===
The draw for the round of 32 was held on 15 April 2014.

30 April 2014	Gangwon FC	3–2 (a.e.t.)	Hongik University	Gangneung Stadium, Gangneung
15:00	Kim Young-hoo 16'; Joélson 82'; Choi Seung-in 98'		Kang Min-seong 5'; Cha Min-seung 52'	Attendance: 400

30 April 2014	Jeonnam Dragons	1–3	Jeonbuk Hyundai Motors	Gwangyang Football Stadium, Gwangyang
19:00	Park Jun-tae 45'		Choi Bo-kyung 42'; Kaio 84', 90'	Attendance: 940

30 April 2014	Ulsan Hyundai	3–1	Soongsil University	Ulsan Munsu Football Stadium, Ulsan
19:30	Kang Min-soo 15'; Park Dong-hyuk 51'; Yoo Jun-soo 63'		Eun Seong-su 80'	Attendance: 517

30 April 2014	Jeju United	3–3 (a.e.t.) (4–5 p)	Suwon FC	Jeju World Cup Stadium, Seogwipo
19:00	Park Su-chang 26'; Jin Dae-sung 44'; Kim Jae-yeon 90+3' (o.g.)		Kim Hyuk-jin 39', 55'; Jung Min-woo 83'	Attendance: 415
	Penalties
	? (penalty scored) ? (penalty scored) ? (penalty scored); Jwa Joon-hyup (penalty missed) ? (penalty scored)		(penalty scored) ? (penalty scored) ? (penalty scored) ? (penalty scored) ? (penalty scored) ?

30 April 2014	Changwon City	0–1 (a.e.t.)	Daejeon Korail	Changwon Football Center, Changwon
15:00			Kim Hyung-woon 120'	Attendance: 200

30 April 2014	Busan IPark	1–1 (a.e.t.) (5–3 p)	Jungnang Chorus Mustang	Busan Asiad Main Stadium, Busan
19:30	Fagner 58'		Kim Seong-hyun 88'	Attendance: 353
	Penalties
	Fagner (penalty scored); Lee Won-young (penalty scored); Yang Dong-hyun (penalty scored); Ju Se-jong (penalty scored); Lim Sang-hyub (penalty scored)		(penalty missed) Heo Jae-won; (penalty scored) Jung Hoon-chan; (penalty scored) Ji Yong-ki; (penalty scored) No Young-kyun

30 April 2014	Sangju Sangmu	0–0 (a.e.t.) (4–3 p)	Suwon Samsung Bluewings	Sangju Civic Stadium, Sangju
19:00				Attendance: 1,005
	Penalties
	Yang Joon-a (penalty scored); Kim Dong-chan (penalty scored); Chang Hyuk-jin (penalty scored); Park Tae-woong (penalty missed); Choi Ho-jung (penalty missed); Kim Chang-hoon (penalty scored)		(penalty scored) Kim Do-heon; (penalty scored) Yeom Ki-hun; (penalty missed) Bae Ki-jong; (penalty missed) Hong Chul; (penalty scored) Roger; (penalty missed) Min Sang-gi

30 April 2014	Gangneung City	2–1	Gyeongnam FC	Gangneung Stadium, Gangneung
19:00	Ko Byung-wook 63'; Yoon Seong-woo 73'		Song Soo-young 75'	Attendance: 1,000

30 April 2014	Hyundai Mipo Dockyard	1–1 (a.e.t.) (5–4 p)	Gyeongju KHNP	Gimcheon Stadium, Gimcheon
	Jung Kyung-ho 13'		Kim Oh-sung 71'	Attendance: 260

30 April 2014	FC Seoul	3–2 (a.e.t.)	Incheon United	Seoul World Cup Stadium, Seoul
19:30	Shim Je-hyeok 1'; Ko Kwang-min 46'; Lee Woong-hee 109'		João Paulo 40'; Lee Seok-hyun 65'	Attendance: 3,115

30 April 2014	Ajou University	1–2	Yeungnam University	Gimcheon Stadium, Gimcheon
15:00	Yoon Tae-su 10'		Choi Kwang-su 22', 77'	Attendance: 230

30 April 2014	Cheonan City	1–0 (a.e.t.)	Hannam University	Cheonan Football Center, Cheonan
15:00	Lee Seung-woo 92'			Attendance: 389

30 April 2014	Gwangju FC	1–0	Bucheon FC 1995	Gwangju World Cup Stadium, Gwangju
19:00	Kim You-sung 13'			Attendance: 250

30 April 2014	FC Anyang	0–0 (a.e.t.) (3–4 p)	Pohang Steelers	Anyang Sports Complex, Anyang
20:00				Attendance: 2,584
	Penalties
	Felipe Adão (penalty missed); Koo Dae-young (penalty scored); Lee Eu-ddeum (penalty scored); Choi Jin-soo (penalty missed); Wagner (penalty missed); Kim Hyo-jun (penalty scored); Kim Tae-bong (penalty missed)		(penalty scored) Hwang Ji-soo; (penalty scored) Shin Kwang-hoon; (penalty missed) Lee Myung-joo; (penalty missed) Kim Dae-ho; (penalty missed) Kim Tae-su; (penalty scored) Son Joon-ho; (penalty scored) Kim Won-il

30 April 2014	Seongnam FC	1–0	Daegu FC	Tancheon Sports Complex, Seongnam
19:30	Hwang Ui-jo 35'			Attendance: 875

21 May 2014	Daejeon Citizen	1–2	FC Pocheon	Daejeon World Cup Stadium, Daejeon
19:30	Kim Eun-jung 47'		Jeon Jae-hee 38'; Shim Young-sung 48'	Attendance: 681

=== Round of 16 ===
The draw for the round of 16 was held on 2 June 2014.

11 July 2014	Daejeon Korail	1–1 (a.e.t.) (4–5 p)	Yeungnam University	Daejeon Hanbat Stadium, Daejeon
19:00	Moon Byung-woo 74'		Jang Soon-kyu 77'	Attendance: 200

16 July 2014	Gangwon FC	2–2 (a.e.t.) (3–2 p)	Hyundai Mipo Dockyard	Gangneung Stadium, Gangneung
16:00	Seo Bo-min 64'; Alex 81'		Jeong Woo-in 15' (o.g.); Lee Yong-jun 36'	Attendance: 300
	Penalties
	Kim Oh-gyu (penalty scored); Jeong Woo-in (penalty missed); Choi Seung-in (penalty scored); Seo Bo-min (penalty scored)		(penalty missed) Allisson; (penalty scored) Alex Rafael; (penalty scored) Han Geon-yong; (penalty missed) Lee Yong-jun; (penalty missed) Park Wan-sun

16 July 2014	Cheonan City	0–1	Sangju Sangmu	Cheonan Football Center, Cheonan
19:00			Han Sang-woon 75'	Attendance: 900

16 July 2014	Busan IPark	3–2 (a.e.t.)	Suwon FC	Busan Asiad Main Stadium, Busan
19:30	Ju Se-jong 22'; Lim Sang-hyub 78'; Fagner 92'		Kim Han-won 13', 81'	Attendance: 1,219

16 July 2014	Gangneung City	1–0	FC Pocheon	Gangneung Stadium, Gangneung
20:00	Lee Kang-min 72'			Attendance: 1,000

16 July 2014	Seongnam FC	2–1 (a.e.t.)	Gwangju FC	Tancheon Sports Complex, Seongnam
19:30	Jung Seon-ho 31'; Kim Dong-hee 97'		Fábio 76'	Attendance: 1,638

16 July 2014	Ulsan Hyundai	1–2	Jeonbuk Hyundai Motors	Ulsan Munsu Football Stadium, Ulsan
19:30	Kasalica 45'		Lee Sang-hyup 21'; Han Kyo-won 60'	Attendance: 1,437

16 July 2014	FC Seoul	2–2 (a.e.t.) (4–2 p)	Pohang Steelers	Seoul World Cup Stadium, Seoul
19:30	Yun Ju-tae 90'; Ko Kwang-min 113'		Kim Hyung-il 55'; Kang Su-il 120'	Attendance: 7,065
	Penalties
	Osmar Barba (penalty scored); Yun Ju-tae (penalty scored); Kim Chi-woo (penalty scored); Kang Seung-jo (penalty scored)		(penalty scored) Kim Jae-sung; (penalty missed) Kim Seung-Dae; (penalty missed) Moon Chang-jin; (penalty scored) Son Joon-ho

=== Quarter-finals ===
The draw for the quarter-finals was held on 22 July 2014.

13 August 2014	Busan IPark	1–2 (a.e.t.)	FC Seoul	Busan Asiad Main Stadium, Busan
19:30	Fagner 2'		Park Hee-seong 39'; Escudero 100'	Attendance: 1,527

13 August 2014	Jeonbuk Hyundai Motors	3–2	Gangneung City	Jeonju World Cup Stadium, Jeonju
19:30	Lee Sang-hyup 49'; Kaio 87', 89'		Ko Byung-wook 36'; Lee Kang-min 83'	Attendance: 3,822

13 August 2014	Seongnam FC	2–1	Yeungnam University	Tancheon Sports Complex, Seongnam
19:30	Lee Chang-hoon 22'; Kim Dong-sub 77'		Jang Soon-kyu 81'	Attendance: 961

13 August 2014	Sangju Sangmu	1–1 (a.e.t.) (6–5 p)	Gangwon FC	Sangju Civic Stadium, Sangju
19:30	Kwon Soon-Hyung 33'		Almir 63'	Attendance: 754

=== Semi-finals ===
The draw for the semi-finals was held on 26 August 2014.

22 October 2014	Sangju Sangmu	0–1	FC Seoul	Sangju Civic Stadium, Sangju
19:00			Kim Joo-young 9'	Attendance: 834

22 October 2014	Jeonbuk Hyundai Motors	0–0 (a.e.t.) (4–5 p)	Seongnam FC	Jeonju World Cup Stadium, Jeonju
19:00				Attendance: 6,823
	Penalties
	Leonardo (penalty scored); Kaio (penalty scored); Wilkinson (penalty scored); Lee Dong-gook (penalty scored); Lee Seung-gi (penalty missed)		(penalty scored) Jung Seon-ho; (penalty scored) Lim Chae-min; (penalty scored) Lee Chang-hoon; (penalty scored) Kim Dong-sub; (penalty scored) Park Jin-po

=== Final ===
23 November 2014	FC Seoul	0–0 (a.e.t.) (2–4 p)	Seongnam FC	Seoul World Cup Stadium, Seoul
14:15 KST				Attendance: 26,721
	Penalties
	Osmar (penalty missed); Kim Jin-kyu (penalty scored); Molina (penalty missed); Kang Seung-jo (penalty scored)		(penalty scored) Jung Seon-ho; (penalty scored) Djeparov; (penalty scored) Lim Chae-min; (penalty scored) Kim Dong-sub

== Top scorers ==
Rank	Player	Team	R32	R16	QF	SF	F	Total
1	(Brazil) Kaio	Jeonbuk Hyundai Motors	2		2			4
2	(Brazil) Fágner	Busan IPark	1	1	1			3
3	(South Korea) Ko Byung-wook	Gangneung City	1		1			2
3	(South Korea) Lee Kang-min	Gangneung City		1	1			2
3	(South Korea) Lee Sang-hyup	Jeonbuk Hyundai Motors		1	1			2
3	(South Korea) Ko Kwang-min	FC Seoul	1	1				2
3	(South Korea) Kim Hyuk-jin	Suwon FC	2					2
3	(South Korea) Kim Han-won	Suwon FC		2				2
3	(South Korea) Jang Soon-kyu	Yeungnam University		1	1			2
3	(South Korea) Choi Kwang-su	Yeungnam University	2					2

== Awards ==
=== Main awards ===
Award	Winner	Team
Most Valuable Player	(South Korea) Park Jun-hyuk	Seongnam FC
Top goalscorer	(Brazil) Kaio	Jeonbuk Hyundai Motors
Fair Play Award	FC Seoul	

=== Man of the Round ===
Round	Winner	Team
First round	(South Korea) Heo Jae-won	Jungnang Chorus Mustang
Second round	(South Korea) Kim Young-nam	Gyeongju KHNP
Round of 32	(South Korea) Kim Hyuk-jin	Suwon FC
Round of 16	(South Korea) Yu Sang-hun	FC Seoul
Quarter-finals	(Brazil) Kaio	Jeonbuk Hyundai Motors
Semi-finals	(South Korea) Kim Ju-young	FC Seoul

== See also ==
- 2014 in South Korean football
- 2014 K League Classic
- 2014 K League Challenge
- 2014 Korea National League
- 2014 K3 Challengers League
