= 2014 K League Challenge =

Hyundai Oilbank K League Challenge
- Season: 2014
- Champions: Daejeon Citizen (1st title)
- Promoted: Daejeon Citizen; Gwangju FC
- Matches: 180
- Goals: 467 (2.59 per match)
- Best Player: Adriano Michael Jackson
- Top goalscorer: Adriano Michael Jackson (27 goals)
- Biggest home win: Ansan 6–1 Daejeon (29 June 2014); Daegu 6–1 Gangwon (2 November 2014)
- Biggest away win: Chungju 0–4 Daejeon (19 April 2014)
- Highest scoring: 7 goals, 6 matches
- Highest attendance: 6,279; Anyang 1–0 Gangwon (29 March 2014)
- Lowest attendance: 217; Gangwon 4–1 Daegu (17 September 2014); Ansan 0–0 Goyang (15 October 2014)
- Average attendance: 1,211

The 2014 K League Challenge was the second season of the K League 2, the second-highest division in the South Korean football league system. Since the 2014 season, the champions was promoted to the K League Classic and three teams from second to fourth-placed team qualified for the promotion playoffs after the regular season.

== Teams ==
Locations of the 2014 K League Challenge clubs

=== Team changes ===
Relegated from K League Classic

- Daegu FC
- Daejeon Citizen
- Gangwon FC

Promoted to K League Classic

- Sangju Sangmu

=== Stadiums ===
Ansan Police	FC Anyang	Bucheon FC 1995
Ansan Wa~ Stadium	Anyang Stadium	Bucheon Stadium
Capacity: 35,000	Capacity: 17,143	Capacity: 34,545
Chungju Hummel	Daegu FC	Daejeon Citizen
Chungju Stadium	Daegu Stadium	Daejeon World Cup Stadium
Capacity: 15,000	Capacity: 68,014	Capacity: 42,176
Gangwon FC	Goyang Hi FC	Gwangju FC
Gangneung Stadium	Goyang Stadium	Gwangju World Cup Stadium
Capacity: 22,333	Capacity: 41,311	Capacity: 44,118
Suwon FC		
Suwon Stadium		
Capacity: 24,670		

=== Personnel and sponsoring ===
Note: Flags indicate national team as has been defined under FIFA eligibility rules. Players may hold more than one non-FIFA nationality.

Team	Managers	Kit manufacturer	Main sponsor
Ansan Police	(South Korea) Cho Dong-hyun	Zaicro	
FC Anyang	(South Korea) Lee Woo-hyung	Zaicro	KB Kookmin Bank
Bucheon FC 1995	(South Korea) Choi Jin-han	Ninety Plus	Bucheon Government
Chungju Hummel	(South Korea) Kim Jong-pil	Hummel	Chungju Government
Daegu FC	(South Korea) Choi Duck-joo	Hummel	
Daejeon Citizen	(South Korea) Cho Jin-ho	Kelme	
Gangwon FC	(Brazil) Arthur Bernardes (South Korea) Park Hyo-jin (caretaker)	Hummel	
Goyang Hi FC	(South Korea) Lee Young-moo (South Korea) Lee Sung-kil (caretaker)	New Balance	
Gwangju FC	(South Korea) Nam Ki-il	Joma	Gwangju Bank
Suwon FC	(South Korea) Cho Duck-je	Hummel	Suwon Government

=== Foreign players ===
Restricting the number of foreign players strictly to four per team, including a slot for a player from AFC countries. A team could use four foreign players on the field each game.

Club	Player 1	Player 2	Player 3	Asian Player	Former Players
FC Anyang	(Brazil) Wagner Querino	(Brazil) Felipe Adão			
Bucheon FC 1995	(Brazil) Rodrigo Paraná				
Chungju Hummel	(Brazil) Raphael	(Brazil) Kalel	(Romania) Ciprian Vasilache		
Daegu FC	(Brazil) Johnathan	(Brazil) Matheus	(Brazil) Néverton		(Brazil) Sandro
Daejeon Citizen	(Brazil) Adriano Michael Jackson	(Brazil) Maranhão	(Brazil) Vanderlei		(Timor-Leste) Diogo Rangel
Gangwon FC	(Brazil) Almir	(Brazil) Joélson	(Brazil) Wesley Alex	(Timor-Leste) Diogo Rangel	(Romania) Ciprian Vasilache
Goyang Hi FC	(Brazil) Maycon	(Brazil) Roniere			(Brazil) Wesley Alex
Gwangju FC	(Brazil) Diego Silva	(Brazil) Fábio Neves	(Brazil) Romarinho		
Suwon FC	(Brazil) Japa	(Montenegro) Vladan Adžić			

== League table ==
Pos	Team	Pld	W	D	L	GF	GA	GD	Pts	Qualification
1	Daejeon Citizen (C, P)	36	20	10	6	64	36	+28	70	Promotion to the K League Classic
2	Ansan Police	36	16	11	9	58	48	+10	59	Qualification for the promotion playoffs semi-final
3	Gangwon FC	36	16	6	14	48	50	−2	54	Qualification for the promotion playoffs first round
4	Gwangju FC (O, P)	36	13	12	11	40	35	+5	51	Qualification for the promotion playoffs first round
5	FC Anyang	36	15	6	15	49	52	−3	51	
6	Suwon FC	36	12	12	12	52	49	+3	48	
7	Daegu FC	36	13	8	15	50	47	+3	47	
8	Goyang Hi FC	36	11	14	11	36	41	−5	47	
9	Chungju Hummel	36	6	16	14	37	57	−20	34	
10	Bucheon FC 1995	36	6	9	21	33	52	−19	27	

Source: K League
Rules for classification: 1) Points; 2) Goal difference; 3) Goals scored.
(C) Champions; (O) Play-off winners; (P) Promoted

== Positions by matchday ==
Leaders
Qualification for the promotion playoffs

=== Round 1–18 ===
Team ╲ Round	1	2	3	4	5	6	7	8	9	10	11	12	13	14	15	16	17	18
Daejeon Citizen	9	6	3	2	1	1	1	1	1	1	1	1	1	1	1	1	1	1
Daegu FC	4	7	8	5	4	4	2	2	4	2	4	2	2	2	2	2	3	2
FC Anyang	5	4	2	1	2	2	4	4	2	6	5	7	3	3	3	4	2	3
Gangwon FC	10	10	10	10	10	9	8	7	3	3	2	4	4	4	4	3	4	4
Goyang Hi FC	5	8	7	4	7	6	3	4	6	5	3	3	5	6	6	6	7	5
Ansan Police	2	1	1	3	3	3	5	6	8	8	9	9	9	9	8	8	8	6
Suwon FC	1	2	6	7	5	7	6	3	5	4	6	5	6	5	5	5	6	7
Gwangju FC	8	5	5	8	6	5	7	9	7	7	7	8	8	8	7	7	5	8
Chungju Hummel	3	3	4	6	8	8	9	8	9	10	10	10	10	10	10	10	9	9
Bucheon FC 1995	7	9	9	9	9	10	10	10	10	9	8	6	7	7	9	9	10	10

Source: K League

=== Round 19–36 ===
Team ╲ Round	19	20	21	22	23	24	25	26	27	28	29	30	31	32	33	34	35	36
Daejeon Citizen	1	1	1	1	1	1	1	1	1	1	1	1	1	1	1	1	1	1
Ansan Police	5	6	4	3	4	3	2	2	2	2	2	3	2	2	2	2	2	2
Gangwon FC	7	3	3	5	3	5	5	4	3	5	3	2	4	4	4	5	3	3
Gwangju FC	6	8	5	6	6	4	4	6	4	3	5	6	5	5	5	6	4	4
FC Anyang	2	2	2	2	2	2	3	3	5	7	6	4	3	3	3	3	5	5
Suwon FC	8	7	8	8	8	7	6	7	6	4	4	5	7	6	6	4	6	6
Daegu FC	3	4	6	4	5	6	7	5	8	8	8	7	8	8	7	7	7	7
Goyang Hi FC	4	5	7	7	7	8	8	8	7	6	7	8	6	7	8	8	8	8
Chungju Hummel	10	10	10	10	9	9	9	9	9	9	9	9	9	9	9	9	9	9
Bucheon FC 1995	9	9	9	9	10	10	10	10	10	10	10	10	10	10	10	10	10	10

Source: K League

== Results ==
=== Matches 1–18 ===
Home \ Away	ASM	ANY	BUC	CJH	DGU	DJC	GWN	GHI	GWJ	SUW
Ansan Police	—	0–3	1–2	0–0	3–2	6–1	1–3	1–1	1–0	4–3
FC Anyang	2–0	—	3–1	1–3	2–0	2–3	1–0	3–1	2–1	0–2
Bucheon FC 1995	3–4	0–1	—	2–3	0–1	1–2	2–2	1–0	1–1	2–3
Chungju Hummel	1–1	2–1	0–2	—	2–3	0–4	1–3	2–2	1–1	2–2
Daegu FC	2–2	1–1	0–1	2–1	—	2–3	2–0	0–1	2–1	0–0
Daejeon Citizen	2–0	4–0	1–0	1–0	0–0	—	2–2	4–1	4–0	2–0
Gangwon FC	0–3	0–0	0–2	5–2	0–1	1–3	—	0–1	2–1	1–0
Goyang Hi FC	2–0	1–1	1–0	1–1	1–2	0–0	2–3	—	2–4	1–0
Gwangju FC	1–1	2–0	2–0	0–0	2–1	0–2	1–1	1–2	—	1–0
Suwon FC	0–3	3–1	3–2	1–1	1–1	4–1	1–1	1–1	0–0	—

Source: K League
Legend: Blue = home team win; Yellow = draw; Red = away team win.

=== Matches 19–36 ===
Home \ Away	ASM	ANY	BUC	CJH	DGU	DJC	GWN	GHI	GWJ	SUW
Ansan Police	—	1–1	3–1	2–0	2–1	1–1	1–0	0–0	3–2	2–1
FC Anyang	1–2	—	1–2	4–1	2–2	1–1	2–1	0–1	0–1	0–3
Bucheon FC 1995	2–2	1–2	—	0–0	0–1	1–1	0–1	0–1	0–2	2–2
Chungju Hummel	2–2	4–1	1–1	—	1–1	0–3	0–1	0–0	2–1	0–0
Daegu FC	1–2	1–2	2–0	1–2	—	1–0	6–1	0–1	0–0	1–2
Daejeon Citizen	0–0	1–3	1–0	1–1	1–0	—	3–0	1–0	0–1	5–2
Gangwon FC	3–1	2–0	2–0	1–0	4–1	1–2	—	1–0	2–4	2–1
Goyang Hi FC	2–1	1–2	0–0	3–1	2–4	2–2	0–0	—	0–0	0–3
Gwangju FC	0–1	1–2	1–1	0–0	2–1	1–0	2–0	1–1	—	2–0
Suwon FC	2–1	2–1	1–0	3–0	2–4	2–2	1–2	1–1	0–0	—

Source: K League
Legend: Blue = home team win; Yellow = draw; Red = away team win.

== Promotion playoffs ==
=== Bracket ===
First round
3	Gangwon FC	0
4	Gwangju FC	1

Semi-final
2	Ansan Police	0
Gwangju FC	3

Final
Gwangju FC	3	1	4
Gyeongnam FC	1	1	2

=== First round ===
22 November 2014
14:00

Gangwon FC	0–1	Gwangju FC
	Report	Kim Ho-nam 53'

Wonju Stadium, Wonju
Attendance: 1,065
Referee: Choi Myung-yong

=== Semi-final ===
29 November 2014
14:00

Ansan Police	0–3	Gwangju FC
	Report	Fábio Neves 70', 71'; Diego Silva 76'

Ansan Wa~ Stadium, Ansan
Attendance: 2,767
Referee: Kim Seong-ho

=== Final ===
The promotion-relegation playoffs were held between the winners of the 2014 K League Challenge playoffs and the 11th-placed club of the 2014 K League Classic. The winners on aggregate score after both matches earned entry into the 2015 K League Classic.

3 December 2014
19:00

Gwangju FC	3–1	Gyeongnam FC
Cho Yong-tae 20'; Diego Silva 48'; Sretenović 85' (o.g.)	Report	Stojanović 32'

Gwangju World Cup Stadium, Gwangju
Attendance: 2,667

6 December 2014
14:00

Gyeongnam FC	1–1	Gwangju FC
Song Soo-young 70'	Report	Kim Ho-nam 75'

Changwon Football Center, Changwon
Attendance: 1,969

Gwangju FC won 4–2 on aggregate and were promoted to the K League Classic, while Gyeongnam FC were relegated to the K League Challenge.

== Player statistics ==
=== Top scorers ===
Rank	Player	Club	Goals
1	(Brazil) Adriano Michael Jackson	Daejeon Citizen	27
2	(Brazil) Wesley Alex	Gangwon FC	16
3	(Brazil) Johnathan	Daegu FC	14
4	(South Korea) Choi Jin-ho	Gangwon FC	13
5	(Brazil) Rodrigo Paraná	Bucheon FC 1995	11
5	(South Korea) Ko Kyung-min	Ansan Police	11
7	(Brazil) Fábio Neves	Gwangju FC	8
7	(South Korea) Kim Chan-hee	Daejeon Citizen	8
7	(South Korea) Jung Min-woo	Suwon FC	8
7	(South Korea) Park Sung-jin	FC Anyang	8
7	(South Korea) Kim Han-won	Suwon FC	8

=== Top assist providers ===
Rank	Player	Club	Assists
1	(South Korea) Choi Jin-ho	Gangwon FC	9
1	(South Korea) Kwon Yong-hyun	Suwon FC	9
3	(South Korea) Choi Jin-soo	FC Anyang	8
4	(South Korea) Kim Seo-jun	Suwon FC	6
4	(South Korea) Park Sung-jin	FC Anyang	6
6	(South Korea) Choi Kwang-hee	Ansan Police	5
6	(South Korea) Lee Jong-min	Gwangju FC	5
6	(South Korea) Kim Chan-hee	Daejeon Citizen	5
6	(South Korea) Seo Myeong-won	Daejeon Citizen	5
6	(South Korea) Yoo Joon-young	Bucheon FC 1995	5
6	(South Korea) Lee Woo-hyeok	Gangwon FC	5
6	(South Korea) Song Ju-han	Daejeon Citizen	5

== Attendance ==
Attendants who entered with free ticket are not counted.

Pos	Team	Total	High	Low	Average	Change
1	Daejeon Citizen	57,583	5,834	772	3,197	−46.6%^{†}
2	FC Anyang	28,298	6,279	415	1,572	−13.4%
3	Gwangju FC	24,200	4,846	615	1,344	−42.6%
4	Bucheon FC 1995	19,374	5,562	305	1,076	−37.3%
5	Gangwon FC	18,144	3,556	217	1,008	−67.9%^{†}
6	Suwon FC	17,823	3,450	405	990	+5.4%
7	Daegu FC	17,383	3,605	472	966	−86.7%^{†}
8	Chungju Hummel	13,938	1,647	317	774	−53.5%
9	Ansan Police	10,761	3,568	217	598	−43.4%
10	Goyang Hi FC	10,508	1,842	252	584	−20.9%
	League total	217,967	6,279	217	1,211	−28.1%

Source: K League
Notes:
^{†} Team played previous season in K League Classic.

== Awards ==
The 2014 K League Awards was held on 1 December 2014.

=== Main awards ===
- Most Valuable Player: (Brazil) Adriano Michael Jackson (Daejeon Citizen)
- Top goalscorer: (Brazil) Adriano Michael Jackson (Daejeon Citizen)
- Top assist provider: (South Korea) Choi Jin-ho (Gangwon FC)
- Manager of the Year: (South Korea) Cho Jin-ho (Daejeon Citizen)

=== Best XI ===
Position	Player	Club
Goalkeeper	(South Korea) Park Ju-won	Daejeon Citizen
Defenders	(South Korea) Lee Jae-kwon	Ansan Police
Defenders	(South Korea) Heo Jae-won	Daegu FC
Defenders	(South Korea) Yoon Won-il	Daejeon Citizen
Defenders	(South Korea) Rim Chang-woo	Daejeon Citizen
Midfielders	(South Korea) Kim Ho-nam	Gwangju FC
Midfielders	(South Korea) Choi Jin-ho	Gangwon FC
Midfielders	(South Korea) Lee Yong-rae	Ansan Police
Midfielders	(South Korea) Choi Jin-soo	FC Anyang
Forwards	(Brazil) Wesley Alex	Gangwon FC
Forwards	(Brazil) Adriano Michael Jackson	Daejeon Citizen

== See also ==
- 2014 in South Korean football
- 2014 K League Classic
- 2014 Korean FA Cup
