= 2013 K League Challenge =

Hyundai Oilbank K League Challenge
- Season: 2013
- Champions: Sangju Sangmu (1st title)
- Promoted: Sangju Sangmu
- Matches: 140
- Goals: 404 (2.89 per match)
- Best player: Lee Keun-ho
- Top goalscorer: Lee Keun-ho (15 goals)
- Average attendance: 1,685

The 2013 K League Challenge was the first season of the K League 2, the second-highest division in the South Korean football league system. Its schedule was announced on 30 January 2013, and it began on 16 March.

== Teams ==
Locations of the 2013 K League Challenge clubs

=== Promotion and relegation ===
Relegated from K League

- Gwangju FC
- Sangju Sangmu

Promoted from Korea National League

- Chungju Hummel
- Goyang Hi FC
- Suwon FC

Promoted from Challengers League

- Bucheon FC 1995

Promoted from R League

- Korean Police

Newly formed

- FC Anyang

=== Stadiums ===
Team	City	State	Stadium	Capacity
FC Anyang	Anyang	Gyeonggi	Anyang Stadium	18,216
Bucheon FC 1995	Bucheon	Gyeonggi	Bucheon Stadium	34,545
Chungju Hummel	Chungju	Chungbuk	Chungju Stadium	15,000
Goyang Hi FC	Goyang	Gyeonggi	Goyang Stadium	41,311
Gwangju FC	Gwangju	—	Gwangju World Cup Stadium	44,118
Korean Police (Note: Korean Police didn't have a home stadium, and played all matches at opponents' stadiums.)	—	—	—	—
Sangju Sangmu	Sangju	Gyeongbuk	Sangju Civic Stadium	15,042
Suwon FC	Suwon	Gyeonggi	Suwon Stadium	24,670

=== Personnel and sponsoring ===
Note: Flags indicate national team as has been defined under FIFA eligibility rules. Players may hold more than one non-FIFA nationality.

Team	Manager	Kit manufacturer	Main sponsor
FC Anyang	(South Korea) Lee Woo-hyung	Jako	KB Kookmin Bank
Bucheon FC 1995	(South Korea) Gwak Kyung-keun	Ninety Plus	Bucheon City
Chungju Hummel	(South Korea) Kim Jong-pil	Hummel	Chungju
Goyang Hi FC	(South Korea) Lee Young-moo	New Balance	
Gwangju FC	(South Korea) Nam Ki-il (caretaker)	Joma	Kwangju Bank
Korean Police	(South Korea) Cho Dong-hyun	Adidas	Korean Police
Sangju Sangmu	(South Korea) Park Hang-seo	Jako	Sangju
Suwon FC	(South Korea) Cho Duck-je	Astore	Suwon

=== Foreign players ===
Restricting the number of foreign players strictly to four per team, including a slot for a player from AFC countries. A team could use four foreign players on the field each game including a least one player from the AFC country.

Club	Player 1	Player 2	Player 3	Asian Player	Former Players
FC Anyang					
Bucheon FC 1995					
Chungju Hummel	(Brazil) Alessandro Lopes	(Brazil) Miguel Bianconi	(Brazil) Tutinha		
Goyang Hi FC	(Brazil) Wesley Alex	(Brazil) Almir			
Gwangju FC	(Brazil) Luizinho	(Brazil) Lúcio Curió			(Brazil) Cássio
Suwon FC	(Montenegro) Bogdan Milić			(Australia) Aleksandar Jovanović	

== League table ==
Pos	Team	Pld	W	D	L	GF	GA	GD	Pts	Qualification
1	Sangju Sangmu (C, P)	35	23	8	4	65	31	+34	77	Qualification for the promotion playoffs
2	Korean Police	35	20	4	11	60	47	+13	64	
3	Gwangju FC	35	16	5	14	55	54	+1	53	
4	Suwon FC	35	13	8	14	53	51	+2	47	
5	FC Anyang	35	12	9	14	50	51	−1	45	
6	Goyang Hi FC	35	10	11	14	43	50	−7	41	
7	Bucheon FC 1995	35	8	9	18	45	61	−16	33	
8	Chungju Hummel	35	7	8	20	33	59	−26	29	

Source: K League
Rules for classification: 1) Points; 2) Goal difference; 3) Goals scored.
(C) Champions; (P) Promoted

== Promotion playoffs ==
4 December 2013
19:00

Sangju Sangmu	4–1	Gangwon FC
Lee Sang-hyup 29', 89'; Lee Seung-hyun 71'; Lee Sang-ho 77'		Choi Seung-in 90+2'

Sangju Civic Stadium

7 December 2013
14:00

Gangwon FC	1–0	Sangju Sangmu
Choi Seung-in 71'

Gangneung Stadium

Sangju Sangmu won 4–2 on aggregate and were promoted to the K League Classic, while Gangwon FC were relegated to the K League Challenge.

== Player statistics ==
=== Top scorers ===
Rank	Player	Club	Goals
1	(South Korea) Lee Keun-ho	Sangju Sangmu	15
1	(South Korea) Lee Sang-hyup	Sangju Sangmu	15
1	(Brazil) Wesley Alex	Goyang Hi FC	15
4	(Brazil) Lúcio Curió	Gwangju FC	13
5	(South Korea) Yang Dong-hyun	Korean Police	11
5	(South Korea) Park Jong-chan	Suwon FC	11
7	(South Korea) Kim Young-hoo	Korean Police	10
8	(South Korea) Jung Jo-gook	Korean Police	9
9	(South Korea) Ha Tae-goon	Sangju Sangmu	8
9	(South Korea) Ko Kyung-min	Korean Police	8

=== Top assist providers ===
Rank	Player	Club	Assists
1	(South Korea) Yeom Ki-hun	Korean Police	11
2	(Brazil) Lúcio Curió	Gwangju FC	10
3	(South Korea) Choi Jin-soo	FC Anyang	8
4	(South Korea) Lim Chang-kyun	Bucheon FC 1995	7
4	(South Korea) Park Sung-jin	FC Anyang	7
4	(South Korea) Baek Jong-hwan	Sangju Sangmu	7
7	(South Korea) Lee Keun-ho	Sangju Sangmu	6
7	(South Korea) Kim Ho-nam	Gwangju FC	6
7	(South Korea) Moon Ki-han	Korean Police	6
7	(South Korea) Kim Han-won	Suwon FC	6
7	(Brazil) Wesley Alex	Goyang Hi FC	6
7	(South Korea) Yoo Soo-hyun	Suwon FC	6

== Attendance ==
Attendants who entered with free ticket were not counted. Korean Police played all matches at opponents' stadiums.

Pos	Team	Total	High	Low	Average	Change
1	Sangju Sangmu	50,759	9,708	483	2,538	−10.0%^{†}
2	Gwangju FC	46,813	18,560	358	2,341	−18.6%^{†}
3	FC Anyang	38,115	6,423	519	1,815	0.0%
4	Bucheon FC 1995	34,307	3,254	642	1,715	0.0%
5	Chungju Hummel	33,250	8,106	323	1,663	0.0%
6	Suwon FC	17,834	1,957	505	939	0.0%
7	Goyang Hi FC	14,768	2,098	284	738	0.0%
	League total	235,846	18,560	284	1,685	0.0%

Source: K League
Notes:
^{†} Team played previous season in K League.

== Awards ==
The 2013 K League Awards was held on 3 December 2013.

=== Main awards ===
- Most Valuable Player: (South Korea) Lee Keun-ho (Sangju Sangmu)
- Manager of the Year: (South Korea) Park Hang-seo (Sangju Sangmu)
- Top goalscorer: (South Korea) Lee Keun-ho (Sangju Sangmu)
- Top assist provider: (South Korea) Yeom Ki-hun (Korean Police)

=== Best XI ===
Position	Player	Club
Goalkeeper	(South Korea) Kim Ho-jun	Sangju Sangmu
Defenders	(South Korea) Choi Chul-soon	Sangju Sangmu
Defenders	(South Korea) Kim Hyung-il	Sangju Sangmu
Defenders	(South Korea) Lee Jae-sung	Sangju Sangmu
Defenders	(South Korea) Oh Beom-seok	Korean Police
Midfielders	(South Korea) Yeom Ki-hun	Korean Police
Midfielders	(South Korea) Lee Ho	Sangju Sangmu
Midfielders	(South Korea) Choi Jin-soo	FC Anyang
Midfielders	(South Korea) Kim Young-hoo	Korean Police
Forwards	(South Korea) Lee Keun-ho	Sangju Sangmu
Forwards	(Brazil) Wesley Alex	Goyang Hi FC

== See also ==
- 2013 in South Korean football
- 2013 K League Classic
- 2013 Korean FA Cup
