= Kim Hyeok-jin =

South Korean footballer (born 1991)

Personal information
- Full name: Kim Hyeok-jin
- Date of birth: 6 March 1991 (age 35)
- Place of birth: South Korea
- Height: 1.75 m (5 ft 9 in)
- Position: Midfielder

Team information
- Current team: Suwon FC
- Number: 16

Youth career
- 2010–2013: Kyung Hee University

Senior career*
Years	Team	Apps	(Gls)
2014–	Suwon FC	47	(0)
- * Club domestic league appearances and goals as of 12 December 2016

Kim Hyeok-jin (Korean: 김혁진; born 6 March 1991) is a South Korean footballer who plays as midfielder for Suwon FC in K League Challenge.

== Career ==
He was selected by Suwon FC in the 2014 K League draft.
