= Kim Tae-bong =

South Korean footballer (born 1988)

Personal information
- Full name: Kim Tae-bong
- Date of birth: 28 February 1988 (age 38)
- Place of birth: South Korea
- Height: 1.73 m (5 ft 8 in)
- Position: Defender

Team information
- Current team: Daejeon Citizen
- Number: 2

Youth career
- 2007–2009: Hanmin University

Senior career*
Years	Team	Apps	(Gls)
2010	Yesan FC	27	(4)
2011–2012	Gangneung City	32	(1)
2013–2015	FC Anyang	74	(2)
2015–	Daejeon Citizen	36	(4)
- * Club domestic league appearances and goals as of 1 January 2018

Kim Tae-bong (Korean: 김태봉; born 28 February 1988) is a South Korean footballer who plays as defender for Daejeon Citizen in K League 2.

== Career ==
He was selected by FC Anyang in 2013 K League draft.
