= 2014 K League =

2014 K League may refer to:

- 2014 K League Classic (1st Division)
- 2014 K League Challenge (2nd Division)
