= Kim Tae-young =

Kim Tae-young may refer to:

- Kim Tae-young (military) (1949–2025), South Korean army general
- Kim Tae-young (footballer, born 1970), retired South Korean football player
- Kim Tae-young (footballer, born 1982), South Korean professional footballer for Yangju FC
- Kim Tae-young (footballer, born 1987), South Korean footballer for Bucheon FC 1995
