= Kim Yun-ho (footballer) =

South Korean footballer (born 1990)

Personal information
- Full name: Kim Yun-ho
- Date of birth: 21 September 1990 (age 36)
- Place of birth: South Korea
- Height: 1.78 m (5 ft 10 in)
- Position: Defender

Team information
- Current team: Busan IPark
- Number: 35

Youth career
- 2009–2012: Catholic Kwandong University

Senior career*
Years	Team	Apps	(Gls)
2013–2016	Gangwon FC	61	(1)
2017–	Busan IPark	3	(0)
- * Club domestic league appearances and goals as of 4 December 2017

Kim Yun-ho (Korean: 김윤호; born 21 September 1990) is a South Korean footballer who plays as defender for Busan IPark.

== Career ==
He was selected by Gangwon FC in 2013 K League draft.

== Club career statistics ==
As of 4 December 2016

Club performance			League		Cup		Other		Total	
Season	Club	League	Apps	Goals	Apps	Goals	Apps	Goals	Apps	Goals
2013	Gangwon FC	K League 1	4	0	1	0	1	0	6	0
2014	Gangwon FC	K League 2	25	0	1	0	—		26	0
2015	Gangwon FC	K League 2	21	1	0	0	—		21	1
2016	Gangwon FC	K League 2	11	0	0	0	3	0	14	0
2017	Busan IPark	K League 2	3	0	0	0	0	0	3	0
Career total			64	1	2	0	4	0	70	1
