= Kim Hyo-jun =

Kim Hyo-jun may refer to:

- Kim Hyo-jun (footballer)
- Kim Hyo-jun (curler)
