= Choi Woo-jae =

South Korean footballer (born 1990)

Choi Woo-jae 최우재
Personal information
- Full name: Choi Woo-jae
- Date of birth: 27 March 1990 (age 36)
- Place of birth: South Korea
- Height: 1.85 m (6 ft 1 in)
- Position: Full-back

Youth career
- 2006–2008: Gwacheon High School

College career
Years	Team	Apps	(Gls)
2009–2012	Chung-Ang University		

Senior career*
Years	Team	Apps	(Gls)
2013–2019	Gangwon FC	45	(1)
2017	→ Hwaseong FC (loan)		
2018	→ Gimpo FC (loan)		
2019	→ FC Anyang (loan)	2	(0)
2020	FC Anyang	1	(0)
2021–2023	Paju Citizen FC	61	(4)
2024	Hong Kong Rangers	6	(0)
- * Club domestic league appearances and goals as of 26 May 2024

Choi Woo-jae (Korean: 최우재; born 21 May 1990) is a South Korean professional footballer who plays as a defender.

== Club career ==
Choi was selected by Gangwon FC in 2013 K League Classic Draft.

On 17 January 2024, Choi joined Hong Kong Premier League club Rangers.

== Honours ==
=== Club ===
Rangers

- Hong Kong Sapling Cup: 2023–24
