= Song Seung-min =

South Korean footballer (born 1992)

Personal information
- Full name: Song Seung-min
- Date of birth: 11 January 1992 (age 34)
- Place of birth: South Korea
- Height: 1.86 m (6 ft 1 in)
- Position: Striker

Youth career
- 2010–2013: University of Incheon

Senior career*
Years	Team	Apps	(Gls)
2014–2017	Gwangju FC	130	(12)
2018–2022	Pohang Steelers	30	(2)
2019–2020	→ Sangju Sangmu (loan)	13	(1)
2021	→ Gwangju FC (loan)	18	(0)
2022–2026	Chungnam Asan FC	82	(4)
- * Club domestic league appearances and goals as of 14 March 2026

Song Seung-min (Korean: 송승민; born 11 January 1992) is a South Korean former footballer who played as striker.

== Career ==
He was selected by Gwangju FC in the 2014 K League draft.
