= Park Young-hwan =

South Korean footballer

Park Young-Hwan
Personal information
- Full name: Park Young-Hwan
- Date of birth: January 1, 1941 (age 85)
- Place of birth: South Korea

Youth career
- Years: Team
- Korea University

Managerial career
- ?: Korea University
- ?: Korea Electronics FC
- 1983: Yukong Elephants (coach)
- 1984–1985.07: Lucky-Goldstar Hwangso (coach)
- 1985.07–1987: Yukong Elephants (coach)
- 2003–2006: Hummel FC
- ‡ National team caps and goals as of 27 December 2007

Park Young-Hwan (Korean: 박영환, born. 1942, in South Korea) is a South Korean former footballer. He was coach of FC Seoul and Jeju United FC. He also served as secretary general of the K-League executive office in 1996.
