= Kim Oh-gyu =

South Korean footballer

Personal information
- Date of birth: 20 June 1989 (age 37)
- Place of birth: Gangneung, South Korea
- Height: 1.83 m (6 ft 0 in)
- Position: Defender

Team information
- Current team: Seoul E-Land FC
- Number: 20

Youth career
- 2005–2007: Gangneung Jungang High School
- 2008–2010: Kwandong University

Senior career*
Years	Team	Apps	(Gls)
2011–2020	Gangwon FC	219	(4)
2015–2017	→ Sangju Sangmu (loan)	35	(0)
2020–2023	Jeju United	115	(4)
2024–	Seoul E-Land FC	88	(2)
Korean name
Hangul	김오규
Hanja	金吾奎
RR	Gim Ogyu
MR	Kim Ogyu
- * Club domestic league appearances and goals as of 5 August 2026

Kim Oh-gyu (Korean: 김오규; born 20 June 1989) is a South Korean footballer who plays as a defender for Seoul E-Land FC.

== Career ==
On January 6, 2024, Oh-kyu joined Seoul E-Land FC.

== Club career statistics ==
As of 6 January 2024

Club performance			League		Cup		League Cup		Other		Total	
Season	Club	League	Apps	Goals	Apps	Goals	Apps	Goals	Apps	Goals	Apps	Goals
South Korea			League		FA Cup		K-League Cup		Other		Total	
2011	Gangwon FC	K League 1	1	0	0	0	0	0	—		1	0
2012	Gangwon FC	K League 1	33	0	1	0	—		—		34	0
2013	Gangwon FC	K League 1	34	0	1	0	—		2	0	37	0
2014	Gangwon FC	K League 2	30	1	4	1	—		1	0	35	2
2015	Gangwon FC	K League 2	14	0	2	0	—		—		16	0
2015	Sangju Sangmu	K League 2	11	0	0	0	—		—		11	0
2016	Sangju Sangmu	K League 1	24	0	0	0	—		—		24	0
2017	Sangju Sangmu	K League 1	0	0	0	0	—		—		0	0
2017	Gangwon FC	K League 1	33	2	2	0	—		—		35	2
2018	Gangwon FC	K League 1	31	0	0	0	—		—		31	0
2019	Gangwon FC	K League 1	28	1	1	0	—		—		29	1
2020	Gangwon FC	K League 1	4	0	0	0	—		—		4	0
2020	Jeju United	K League 2	18	1	1	0	—		—		19	1
2021	Jeju United	K League 1	32	1	5	0	—		—		37	1
2022	Jeju United	K League 1	30	1	2	0	—		—		32	1
2023	Jeju United	K League 1	30	1	2	0	—		—		32	1
Total			353	8	21	0	0	0	3	0	377	8

Sporting positions
Preceded by Chun Jae-ho	Gangwon FC captain 2014	Succeeded by Incumbent
