= Lee Jae-cheol =

South Korean footballer

Lee Jae-Cheol
Personal information
- Full name: Lee Jae-Cheol
- Date of birth: 25 December 1975 (age 50)
- Place of birth: Incheon, South Korea
- Height: 1.73 m (5 ft 8 in)
- Position: Defender

Youth career
- 1999: Kwangwoon University

Senior career*
Years	Team	Apps	(Gls)
1999	Suwon Samsung Bluewings	1	(0)
2000–2007	Hummel FC / Chungju Hummel FC	?	(?)

Managerial career
- 2008–2011: Chungju Hummel FC (coach)
- 2012–2013: Chungju Hummel FC
- * Club domestic league appearances and goals

- Lee Jae-cheol
- Hangul: 이재철
- Hanja: 李在哲
- RR: I Jaecheol
- MR: I Chaech'ŏl

Lee Jae-Cheol (Korean: 이재철; born 25 December 1975) is a South Korean former footballer who played as a defender for Suwon Samsung Bluewings in the K League. He also played for Hummel FC in Korea National League. In the 2013 season, he was manager of Chungju Hummel FC, but was let go due to bad results.
