= Han Hong-gyu =

South Korean footballer

Personal information
- Date of birth: 26 July 1990 (age 36)
- Place of birth: South Korea
- Height: 1.83 m (6 ft 0 in)
- Position: Forward

Team information
- Current team: Bay Olympic
- Number: 8

Youth career
- 2009–2012: Sungkyunkwan University

Senior career*
| Years | Team | Apps | (Gls) |
| 2013–2016 | Chungju Hummel | 61 | (12) |
| 2015–2016 | → Ansan Mugunghwa (army) | 21 | (1) |
| 2017 | Gangneung City | 16 | (2) |
| 2020 | Metro | 7 | (5) |
| 2021– | Bay Olympic | 14 | (5) |
Korean name
| Hangul | 한홍규 |
| Hanja | 韓洪奎 |
| RR | Han Honggyu |
| MR | Han Honggyu |
- * Club domestic league appearances and goals as of 12 July 2021

Han Hong-gyu (Korean: 한홍규; born 26 July 1990) is a South Korean footballer who plays as a striker for Bay Olympic in New Zealand's Northern League.

== Career ==
He signed with Chungju Hummel FC before 2013 season. He scored his debut goal against Suwon FC on 21 April.

== Honours ==
Asan Mugunghwa FC

- K League 2 winners: 2016
