= Choi In-chang =

South Korean footballer (born 1990)

Personal information
- Full name: Choi In-chang
- Date of birth: 11 April 1990 (age 36)
- Place of birth: South Korea
- Height: 1.94 m (6 ft 4 1/2 in)
- Position: Striker

Team information
- Current team: Bucheon FC 1995
- Number: 18

Youth career
- Pohang Steelers
- 2009–2012: Hanyang University

Senior career*
Years	Team	Apps	(Gls)
2014–	Bucheon FC	41	(7)
- * Club domestic league appearances and goals as of 28 November 2014

Choi In-chang (Korean: 최인창; born 11 April 1990) is a South Korean footballer who plays as striker for Bucheon FC 1995 in K League Challenge.

== Career ==
Park was selected by Bucheon FC in the 2013 K League draft. He made 10 appearances and a goal in his debut season.
