= Yoo Joon-young =

South Korean footballer

Personal information
- Full name: Yoo Joon-young
- Date of birth: 17 February 1990 (age 36)
- Place of birth: South Korea
- Height: 1.77 m (5 ft 9 1/2 in)
- Position: Midfielder

Team information
- Current team: Bucheon FC
- Number: 19

Youth career
- 2009–2012: Kyung Hee University

Senior career*
Years	Team	Apps	(Gls)
2013–	Bucheon FC	50	(6)
2015	→ Gyeongnam FC (loan)	3	(0)
- * Club domestic league appearances and goals as of 1 November 2016

Yoo Joon-young (Korean: 유준영; born 17 February 1990) is a South Korean footballer who plays as midfielder for Bucheon FC 1995 in K League Challenge.

== Career ==
Yoo was selected by Bucheon FC in the 2013 K League draft. He made 15 appearances and scored three goals in his debut season.
