= Ciprian Vasilache =

Romanian footballer (born 1983)

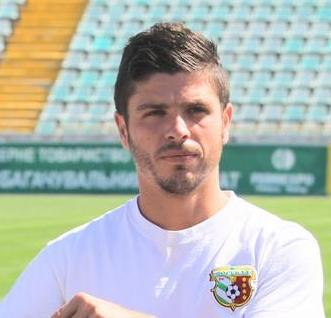

Personal information
- Date of birth: 14 September 1983 (age 43)
- Place of birth: Baia Mare, Romania
- Height: 1.72 m (5 ft 8 in)
- Position: Midfielder

Youth career
- –2002: FC Baia Mare

Senior career*
Years	Team	Apps	(Gls)
2002–2003	Gloria Bistrița	16	(1)
2004–2006	Rapid București	35	(1)
2004	→ Gloria Bistrița (loan)	7	(0)
2007–2009	Pandurii Târgu Jiu	48	(4)
2010	Ceahlăul Piatra Neamț	13	(3)
2010–2012	FCM Târgu Mureș	27	(2)
2012	Gaz Metan Mediaș	7	(1)
2013	Bihor Oradea	10	(0)
2013	Vorskla Poltava	3	(0)
2014	Gangwon FC	13	(0)
2014	→ Chungju Hummel (loan)	13	(0)
2015	Petrolul Ploiești	8	(1)
2015	Zaria Bălți	9	(2)
2016	Baia Mare	17	(1)
2016-2017	Bishop's Stortford	1	(0)
Total		227	(16)
- * Club domestic league appearances and goals

Ciprian Vasilache (born 14 September 1983) is a Romanian former professional footballer who played as a midfielder. Vasilache made his début in Liga I with Gloria Bistrița, in 2002. Between January 2004 and January 2007 he played for Rapid București, becoming a key member of the first team squad and scoring important goals during the 2005–06 UEFA Cup, against Vardar Skopje and Feyenoord.

== Honours ==
Rapid București

- Cupa României: 2005–06
