= Jung Min-woo =

South Korean footballer (born 1992)

Personal information
- Full name: Jung Min-woo
- Date of birth: 1 December 1992 (age 33)
- Place of birth: South Korea
- Height: 1.77 m (5 ft 9 1/2 in)
- Position: Forward

Team information
- Current team: Gimhae City FC
- Number: 19

Youth career
- Honam University

Senior career*
Years	Team	Apps	(Gls)
2014–2016	Suwon FC	61	(11)
2017–2018	Daejeon Citizen	14	(4)
2018	Gyeongju KHNP FC	14	(5)
2021-2022	Daejeon Korail FC	37	(15)
2022 -	Gimhae City FC	9	(3)
- * Club domestic league appearances and goals as of 22 October 2022

Jung Min-woo (Korean: 정민우; born 1 December 1992) is a South Korean footballer who plays as forward for Gimhae City FC in K3 League.

== Career ==
Jung was selected by Suwon FC in the 2014 K League draft. He made his debut goal in the opening match of 2014 season against Daejeon Citizen.
