= Song Ju-han =

South Korean footballer

Personal information
- Full name: Song Ju-han
- Date of birth: 16 June 1993 (age 33)
- Place of birth: Iksan, South Korea
- Height: 1.80 m (5 ft 11 in)
- Position: Defender

Team information
- Current team: FC Pocheon

Youth career
- 2012–2013: University of Incheon

Senior career*
Years	Team	Apps	(Gls)
2014–2015	Daejeon Citizen	42	(1)
2015–2016	Gyeongnam FC	17	(0)
2017–	FC Pocheon		

International career
2011–2012	South Korea U-20		
2014	South Korea U-23		
- * Club domestic league appearances and goals as of 1 January 2017

Song Ju-han (Korean: 송주한; born 16 June 1993) is a South Korean footballer who plays as a defender for FC Pocheon in K3 League.

== Career ==
He signed with Daejeon Citizen in 2014. He made his debut in the league match against Suwon FC.
