= Kim Tae-young (footballer, born 1987) =

South Korean footballer

Kim Tae-Young
Personal information
- Full name: Kim Tae-Young
- Date of birth: 14 September 1987 (age 39)
- Place of birth: South Korea
- Height: 1.66 m (5 ft 5 1/2 in)
- Position: Midfielder

Team information
- Current team: Bucheon FC
- Number: 28

Youth career
- 2006–2007: Yewon Arts University

Senior career*
Years	Team	Apps	(Gls)
2008–2009	Super Reds	32	(1)
2010–	Bucheon FC 1995	39	(1)
- * Club domestic league appearances and goals as of 28 November 2014

Kim Tae-Young (Korean: 김태영; born 14 September 1987) is a South Korean footballer who plays as midfielder for Bucheon FC 1995 in K League Challenge.

== Career ==
In 2008, he joined S. League side Supre Reds for a living.

He moved to Bucheon FC 1995 in Challengers League in 2010. He was selected by Bucheon in the 2013 K League draft after his team decided to participate in the professional league K League Challenge.
