= Seo Bo-min =

South Korean footballer (born 1990)

Personal information
- Full name: Seo Bo-min
- Date of birth: 22 June 1990 (age 36)
- Place of birth: South Korea
- Height: 1.77 m (5 ft 9 1/2 in)
- Position: Midfielder

Team information
- Current team: Gimpo FC
- Number: 15

Youth career
- Kwandong University

Senior career*
Years	Team	Apps	(Gls)
2014–2016	Gangwon FC	103	(9)
2017	Pohang Steelers	19	(1)
2018–2022	Seongnam FC	95	(9)
2022-2023	Seoul E-Land FC	50	(0)
2024–	Gimpo FC	3	(0)
- * Club domestic league appearances and goals as of 31 December 2023

Seo Bo-min (Korean: 서보민; born 22 June 1990) is a South Korean footballer who plays as midfielder for K League 2 club Gimpo FC.

== Career ==
He signed with Gangwon FC on 13 December 2013.

On 4 March 2022, he joined Seoul E-Land FC. On 31 December 2023, he left the club as the contract end.
