= Kim Hyo-jun (footballer) =

South Korean footballer (born 1978)

Kim Hyo-Jun
Personal information
- Full name: Kim Hyo-Jun
- Date of birth: 13 October 1978 (age 48)
- Place of birth: South Korea
- Height: 1.84 m (6 ft 1/2 in)
- Position: Defender

Senior career*
Years	Team	Apps	(Gls)
2005	Incheon Korail	17	(0)
2006–2007	Gyeongnam FC	7	(0)
2008–2010	Gimhae City	74	(4)
2011–2012	Goyang KB	39	(3)
2013–2014	FC Anyang	36	(2)
- * Club domestic league appearances and goals as of 24 November 2014

Kim Hyo-Jun (Korean: 김효준; born 13 October 1978) is a South Korean retired footballer who played as defender.
