= Kim Dong-ki =

South Korean footballer (born 1989)

Kim Dong-Ki
Personal information
- Full name: Kim Dong-Ki
- Date of birth: 27 May 1989 (age 37)
- Place of birth: South Korea
- Height: 1.88 m (6 ft 2 in)
- Position: Striker

Youth career
- Kyunghee University

Senior career*
Years	Team	Apps	(Gls)
2012–2015	Gangwon FC	63	(11)
2015	→ FC Anyang (loan)	16	(2)
2016	FC Anyang	6	(0)
2017	Pohang Steelers	5	(0)
2017	→ Seongnam FC (loan)	0	(0)
- * Club domestic league appearances and goals as of 1 January 2018

Kim Dong-Ki (Korean: 김동기; born 27 May 1989) is a South Korean footballer who plays as a striker.
