= Choi Yo-seb =

South Korean footballer

Personal information
- Full name: Choi Yo-seb
- Date of birth: September 22, 1989 (age 37)
- Place of birth: South Korea
- Height: 1.70 m (5 ft 7 in)
- Position: Forward

Youth career
- Kwandong University

Senior career*
Years	Team	Apps	(Gls)
2011–2012	Busan IPark	15	(1)
2013–2018	Gangwon FC	102	(26)
2017–2018	→ Sangju Sangmu (army)	9	(1)
2019	Asan Mugunghwa FC	8	(1)
2020	→ Gimpo Citizen FC (army)	0	(0)
Total		134	(29)
- * Club domestic league appearances and goals as of 3 January 2018

Choi Yo-seb (Korean: 최요셉; born 22 September 1989) is a South Korean retired footballer.

== Club career ==
Choi joined Busan I'Park in 2011, and made his first league appearance on 6 March 2011, coming on as a late substitute in Busan's away win over Jeju United. In one of his few starts in 2011, the majority of his appearances being as a substitute, Choi scored his first professional goal in a 2011 K-League Cup match against Gangwon FC, ensuring his side a comfortable two-nil win.

== Club career statistics ==
As of 13 December 2014

Club performance			League		Cup		League Cup		Total	
Season	Club	League	Apps	Goals	Apps	Goals	Apps	Goals	Apps	Goals
South Korea			League		KFA Cup		League Cup		Total	
2011	Busan I'Park	K League 1	8	0	1	0	4	1	13	1
2012	Busan I'Park	K League 1	7	1	4	1	-		11	2
2013	Gangwon FC	K League 1	24	6	0	0	-		24	6
2014	Gangwon FC	K League 2	33	13	3	1	-		36	14
Career total			72	20	8	2	4	1	84	23
