= Han Ji-won =

South Korean footballer (born 1994)

Personal information
- Full name: Han Ji-won
- Date of birth: 9 April 1994 (age 32)
- Place of birth: South Korea
- Height: 1.77 m (5 ft 10 in)
- Position: Midfielder

Team information
- Current team: Changwon City FC

Senior career*
Years	Team	Apps	(Gls)
2016–2017	Jeonnam Dragons	8	(0)
2018,2021	Ansan Greeners	13	(0)
2021	Gyeongnam FC	0	(0)
2022 -	Changwon City FC	17	(1)
- * Club domestic league appearances and goals as of 21 October 2022

Han Ji-won (Korean: 한지원; born 9 April 1994) is a South Korean footballer who plays for Changwon City FC.
