= Chang Hyuk-jin =

South Korean footballer (born 1989)

Personal information
- Full name: Chang Hyuk-jin
- Date of birth: 6 December 1989 (age 36)
- Place of birth: Seokgwan-dong, Seoul, South Korea
- Height: 1.78 m (5 ft 10 in)
- Position: Midfielder

Youth career
- 2002–2004: Seokgwan Middle School
- 2005–2007: Kwangwoon Electronics Technical High School
- 2008: Pai Chai University
- 2009: Daekyeung University

Senior career*
| Years | Team | Apps | (Gls) |
| 2010 | Gangneung City | 12 | (3) |
| 2011–2016 | Gangwon | 93 | (5) |
| 2011 | → Gangneung City (loan) | 13 | (5) |
| 2013–2014 | → Sangju Sangmu (army) | 17 | (1) |
| 2017–2019 | Ansan Greeners | 101 | (10) |
| 2020–2022 | Gyeongnam | 59 | (0) |
| 2022 | Suwon | 20 | (1) |
| 2023–2024 | Chungbuk Cheongju | 63 | (0) |
- * Club domestic league appearances and goals as of 30 November 2024

Chang Hyuk-jin (Korean: 장혁진; born 6 December 1989) is a South Korean former professional footballer who played as a midfielder and is currently assistant manager of Gyeongbuk NS High School.

== Club career ==
Chang joined Gangwon FC for the 2011 K League season, having previously turned out for National League side Gangneung City FC. His first match for Gangwon was the second group match of the 2011 K-League Cup against the Chunnam Dragons, in which he came on as a substitute midway through the second half. Chang's first match in the K-League itself was against Ulsan Hyundai FC, again as a substitute.

Ahead of the 2022 season, Chang joined Suwon after being part of a swap deal involving Jeong Chung-geun.

In 2024, Chang Hyuk-jin announced his official retirement from football after 14 years as a player.

== Club career statistics ==
As of 8 January 2014

| Club performance | | | League | | Cup | | League Cup | | Total | |
| Season | Club | League | Apps | Goals | Apps | Goals | Apps | Goals | Apps | Goals |
| South Korea | | | League | | KFA Cup | | League Cup | | Total | |
|---|---|---|---|---|---|---|---|---|---|---|
| 2010 | Gangneung City FC | Korea National League | 12 | 3 | 1 | 0 | — | | 13 | 3 |
| 2011 | Gangwon FC | K-League | 5 | 0 | 2 | 0 | 3 | 0 | 10 | 0 |
| 2011 | Gangneung City FC | Korea National League | 13 | 5 | 0 | 0 | — | | 13 | 5 |
| 2012 | Gangwon FC | K League 1 | 15 | 1 | 1 | 0 | — | | 16 | 1 |
| 2013 | Sangju Sangmu FC | K League 2 | 10 | 1 | 0 | 0 | — | | 10 | 1 |
| Career total | | | 55 | 10 | 4 | 0 | 3 | 0 | 61 | 10 |
