= Kim Bon-kwang =

South Korean footballer (born 1988)

Kim Bon-Kwang
Personal information
- Full name: Kim Bon-Kwang
- Date of birth: 30 September 1988 (age 38)
- Place of birth: South Korea
- Height: 1.72 m (5 ft 7 1/2 in)
- Position: Midfielder

Team information
- Current team: Suwon FC
- Number: 32

Youth career
- Tamra University

Senior career*
Years	Team	Apps	(Gls)
2010	Jeju United	0	(0)
2011–2012	Cheonan City	37	(2)
2012–2013	Mokpo City	21	(0)
2013–	Suwon FC	47	(6)
- * Club domestic league appearances and goals as of 27 November 2014

Kim Bon-Kwang (Korean: 김본광; born 30 September 1988) is a South Korean footballer who plays as midfielder for Suwon FC in K League Challenge.

== Career ==
He was selected by Jeju United in the 2010 K-League draft but made no appearance in Jeju. He moved to Cheonan City after the 2010 season.

He joined Suwon FC after a trial basis in June 2013.
