= Ko Kyung-min =

South Korean footballer (born 1987)

Personal information
- Full name: Ko Kyung-min
- Date of birth: 11 April 1987 (age 39)
- Place of birth: South Korea
- Height: 1.77 m (5 ft 9 1/2 in)
- Position: Forward

Team information
- Current team: Gyeongnam FC
- Number: 19

Youth career
- Hanyang University

Senior career*
Years	Team	Apps	(Gls)
2010	Incheon United	2	(0)
2011	Ulsan Hyundai Mipo	8	(3)
2012	Yongin City	25	(12)
2013–2015	FC Anyang	43	(21)
2013–2015	→ Ansan Police (army)	51	(14)
2016–2018	Busan IPark	76	(25)
2019–	Gyeongnam FC	22	(0)
- * Club domestic league appearances and goals as of 8 January 2020

Ko Kyung-min (Korean: 고경민; born 11 April 1987) is a South Korean footballer who plays as a forward for Gyeongnam FC in the K League 2.

== Career ==
He was selected by Incheon United in 2010 K-League Draft.
