= Wonju Stadium =

Stadium in South-Korea

- Interactive map of Wonju Stadium
- Location: 342, Myeongnyun-dong, Wonju, Gangwon-do, South Korea
- Coordinates: 37.33733°N 127.94421°E
- Owner: City of Wonju
- Operator: City of Wonju
- Capacity: 20,000
- Surface: Natural grass

Construction
- Groundbreaking: June 1, 1978
- Opened: May 10, 1980

Tenants
- Hyundai Horang-i (1987–1989); Gangwon FC (2013–2016)

Wonju Stadium is a multi-purpose stadium in Wonju, South Korea. It is currently used mostly for football matches. The stadium has a capacity of 20,000 people and was opened in 1980.
