= Choi Seung-in =

South Korean footballer

Personal information
- Date of birth: March 5, 1991 (age 35)
- Place of birth: South Korea
- Height: 1.80 m (5 ft 11 in)
- Position: Forward

Team information
- Current team: LSK Hansa
- Number: 33

Senior career*
Years	Team	Apps	(Gls)
2010	Shonan Bellmare	1	(0)
2011	Zweigen Kanazawa	0	(0)
2012	Cheongju Jikji FC	15	(0)
2013–2015	Gangwon FC	61	(15)
2016–2019	Busan IPark	51	(8)
2022	Blau-Weiß Lohne	0	(0)
2022–	LSK Hansa	12	(1)
- * Club domestic league appearances and goals as of 19 November 2022

Choi Seung-in (born March 5, 1991) is a South Korean football player who plays for German club LSK Hansa.

== Club statistics ==
As of 21 December 2019

Club performance			League		Cup		League Cup		Play-offs		Total	
Season	Club	League	Apps	Goals	Apps	Goals	Apps	Goals	Apps	Goals	Apps	Goals
Japan			League		Emperor's Cup		J. League Cup		Play-offs		Total	
2010	Shonan Bellmare	J1 League	1	0	0	0	1	0	-	-	2	0
Korea			League		FA Cup		League Cup		Play-offs		Total	
2013	Gangwon FC	K League 1	10	2	0	0	-	-	2	2	12	4
2014	Gangwon FC	K League 2	20	2	1	0	-	-	-	-	21	2
2015	Gangwon FC	K League 2	31	11	1	2	-	-	-	-	32	13
2016	Busan IPark	K League 2	14	2	0	0	-	-	-	-	14	2
2017	Busan IPark	K League 2	15	1	5	3	-	-	1	0	21	4
2018	Busan IPark	K League 2	19	5	3	0	-	-	0	0	22	5
2019	Busan IPark	K League 2	3	0	0	0	-	-	0	0	3	0
Career total			113	23	10	5	1	0	3	2	127	30
