= Alex Rafael =

Brazilian footballer (born 1988)

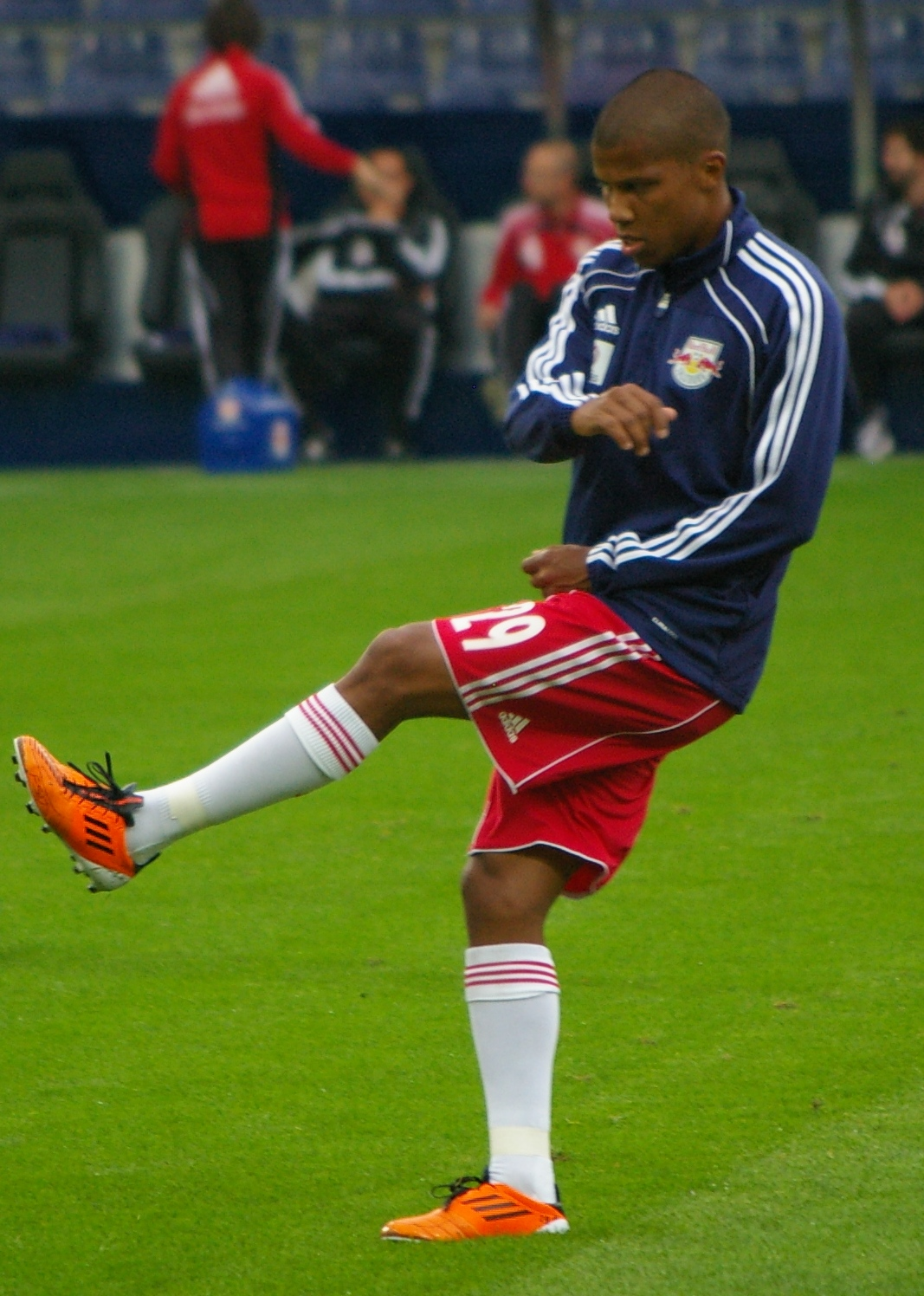

Personal information
- Full name: Alex Rafael da Silva Antônio
- Date of birth: 1 January 1988 (age 38)
- Place of birth: São Paulo, Brazil
- Height: 1.75 m (5 ft 9 in)
- Position: Forward

Youth career
- 2006: Corinthians
- 2007–2008: Palmeiras

Senior career*
Years	Team	Apps	(Gls)
2008–2010	Red Bull Brasil	83	(26)
2011–2012	Red Bull Salzburg	5	(0)
2012	→ Comercial-SP (loan)	5	(0)
2012	Thespa Kusatsu	10	(3)
2013	Ferroviária	7	(0)
2014	Ulsan Hyundai Mipo Dockyard	19	(5)
2014–2015	Alimos	7	(0)
2015–2016	Ubon UMT United	40	(26)
2016	Sukhothai	8	(1)
2017	Al-Shamal	7	(9)
2017–2018	Ras Al Khaima	11	(3)
2018	Nam Định	1	(0)
2018–2019	Sheikh Russel	9	(3)
2020	Chiangmai	2	(0)
2020–2021	Lampang	14	(5)
- * Club domestic league appearances and goals as of 14:28, 25 January 2019 (UTC)

Alex Rafael da Silva Antônio (born January 1, 1988), also known as Alex Rafael, is a Brazilian footballer who plays as a forward.

== Early life ==
Alex Rafael was born in São Paulo. He began his career in 2008 playing for the domestic team Red Bull Brazil. After a short period of a month he became one of the first players to play for the Salzburg club in Austria. He signed a year contract within a week. Shortly after he returned to Brazil to play for Commercial, which later loaned him to Thespa Kusatsu in Japan. Finally he was loaned back to Brazil to play for Ferroviaria in 2013. In a January 2017 he signed a contract with Al Shamal.

== Honour ==
Ubon UMT United

- Regional League Division 2:
  - Winners : 2015
- Regional League North-East Division
  - Runner-up : 2015
