= Alex (footballer, born February 1988) =

Brazilian footballer

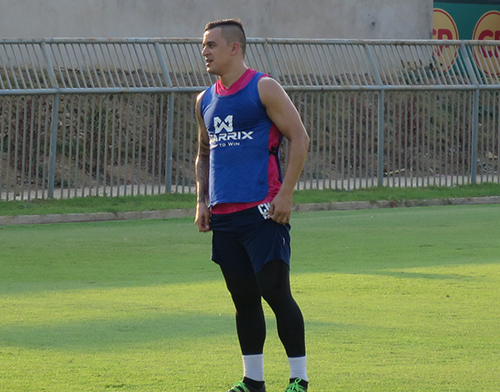

Personal information
- Full name: Wesley Alex Maiolino
- Date of birth: 10 February 1988 (age 38)
- Place of birth: Jacareí, Brazil
- Height: 1.77 m (5 ft 9 1/2 in)
- Position: Forward

Senior career*
Years	Team	Apps	(Gls)
2006–2007	Jacareí		
2007	Atlético Joseense		
2008–2009	Primeira Camisa		
2010–2011	Ulsan Hyundai Mipo	63	(26)
2012	São Caetano	2	(0)
2012	Oeste	0	(0)
2013–2014	Goyang Hi FC	46	(27)
2014	Gangwon FC	15	(5)
2015–2016	Chainat Hornbill	50	(22)
2016	Daegu FC	20	(4)
2017	FC Anyang	5	(0)
2017	Seoul E-Land	14	(7)
2018	FC Anyang	28	(15)
2019	Seoul E-Land	25	(6)
- * Club domestic league appearances and goals as of 31 December 2019

Wesley Alex Maiolino, known as Alex (born 10 February 1988), is a Brazilian footballer who plays as a forward.

== Career ==
He joined Ulsan Hyundai Mipo in 2012 and became the first-ever foreign player of the Korea National League.

== Honours ==
Individual

- K League 2 Best XI (with Goyang Hi): 2013, 2014
