= Baek Jong-hwan =

South Korean footballer

Personal information
- Date of birth: April 18, 1985 (age 41)
- Place of birth: South Korea
- Height: 1.78 m (5 ft 10 in)
- Position: Defender

Team information
- Current team: Daejeon Citizen
- Number: 77

Senior career*
Years	Team	Apps	(Gls)
2008–2010	Jeju United	5	(0)
2010–2017	Gangwon FC	139	(4)
2013–2014	→ Sangju Sangmu (army)	48	(1)
2018–	Daejeon Citizen	5	(0)
- * Club domestic league appearances and goals as of 3 January 2019

- Baek Jong-hwan
- Hangul: 백종환
- Hanja: 白鐘煥
- RR: Baek Jonghwan
- MR: Paek Chonghwan

Baek Jong-hwan (born 18 April 1985) is a South Korean footballer who plays for Daejeon Citizen in the K League Challenge.

== Career ==
Baek began his playing career with Jeju United in 2008. In July 2010, he moved to Gangwon FC.

=== Statistics ===
As of 31 October 2011

Club performance			League		Cup		League Cup		Total	
Season	Club	League	Apps	Goals	Apps	Goals	Apps	Goals	Apps	Goals
South Korea			League		KFA Cup		League Cup		Total	
2008	Jeju United FC	K League	2	0	1	0	5	0	8	0
2009	Jeju United FC	K League	3	0	0	0	2	0	5	0
2010	Jeju United FC	K League	0	0	0	0	0	0	0	0
2010	Gangwon FC	K League	7	1	0	0	0	0	7	1
2011	Gangwon FC	K League	17	0	0	0	3	0	20	0
Career total			29	1	1	0	10	0	40	1
