= Sangju Civic Stadium =

Sports venue in Sangju, South Korea

Coordinates: 36°25′57″N 128°09′42″E

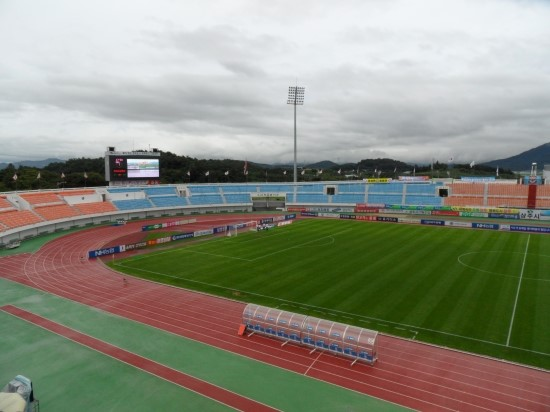
- Interactive map of Sangju Civic Stadium
- Location: Sangju, Gyeongsangbuk-do, South Korea
- Operator: Municipally of Sangju
- Capacity: 15,042
- Surface: Grass, Tartan track
- Field size: 105 x 70 m (Running track: 400 m x 8 lane)

Construction
- Opened: 22 January 1992
- Cost: 74 billion won (US$7 million)

Tenant
- Sangju Sangmu (2011–2020)

- Sangju Civic Stadium
- Hangul: 상주시민운동장
- RR: Sangju simin undongjang
- MR: Sangju simin undongjang

Sangju Civic Stadium is a multi-purpose stadium in Sangju, South Korea. It is currently used mostly for football matches. The stadium holds 15,042 spectators.
