= Kim Chan-hee =

South Korean footballer (born 1990)

Kim Chan-Hee
Personal information
- Full name: Kim Chan-Hee
- Date of birth: 25 June 1990 (age 36)
- Place of birth: South Korea
- Height: 1.84 m (6 ft 1/2 in)
- Position: Forward

Team information
- Current team: Dangjin Citizen FC
- Number: 20

Youth career
- Hanyang University

Senior career*
Years	Team	Apps	(Gls)
2012–2013	Pohang Steelers	2	(0)
2014–2018	Daejeon Citizen	54	(12)
2017–2018	→ Pocheon FC (loan)	18	(10)
2019	Bucheon FC 1995	12	(1)
2020-2021	Gyeongju KHNP FC	31	(9)
2022	Cheonan City FC	10	(0)
2022-	Dangjin Citizen FC	6	(1)
- * Club domestic league appearances and goals as of 15 October 2022

Kim Chan-Hee (Korean: 김찬희; born 25 June 1990) is a South Korean footballer who plays as a centre forward for Dangjin Citizen FC in the K3 League. He Joined K League 1 team Pohang Steelers in 2012–2013.
