= Rodrigo Paraná =

Brazilian footballer (born 1987)

Personal information
- Full name: Rodrigo Domingos dos Santos
- Date of birth: January 25, 1987 (age 39)
- Place of birth: Nossa Senhora do Livramento, Brazil
- Height: 1.80 m (5 ft 11 in)
- Position: Striker

Senior career*
Years	Team	Apps	(Gls)
2007	Londrina		
2008	Ceilândia		
2010–2011	Rio Claro		
2012	URT		
2012	Junior Team		
2012–2013	Rio Claro	0	(0)
2013	São Bento		
2014–2015	Bucheon	67	(22)
2016	V-Varen Nagasaki	6	(0)
2016	→ Giravanz Kitakyushu (loan)	16	(3)
2017	Rio Claro	0	(0)
2017	Bucheon	14	(2)
2018	Ubon UMT United	11	(1)
2018	Siheung City FC		
2019	Inter de Limeira	0	(0)
2020	Rio Claro	0	(0)
- * Club domestic league appearances and goals as of 13:56, 17 September 2020 (UTC)

Rodrigo Domingos dos Santos or simply Rodrigo Paraná (born January 25, 1987), is a Brazilian footballer.

== Career ==
He joined K League 2 side Bucheon FC and became the first foreign player in the club's history.
