= Kim Han-won =

South Korean footballer (born 1986)

Kim Han-Won
Personal information
- Date of birth: August 6, 1981 (age 45)
- Place of birth: South Korea
- Height: 1.81 m (5 ft 11 in)
- Position: Forward

Youth career
- Saekyung College

Senior career*
Years	Team	Apps	(Gls)
2004–2005	Suwon City	26	(12)
2006	Incheon United	15	(3)
2007–2008	Jeonbuk Hyundai Motors	9	(0)
2009–	Suwon FC	210	(60)
Medal record
Representing South Korea
Men's football
East Asian Games
Bronze medal – third place	2009 Hong Kong	Team
- * Club domestic league appearances and goals as of 12 December 2016

Kim Han-Won (born August 6, 1986) is a South Korean football player who since 2009 has played for Suwon FC (formerly Jeonbuk Hyundai Motors and Incheon United).

Awards
Preceded by (South Korea) Kim Jae-Chun	N-League Top Scorer; 2005	Succeeded by (South Korea) Kim Young-Hoo
