= Bucheon Stadium =

Sports venue in Bucheon, South Korea

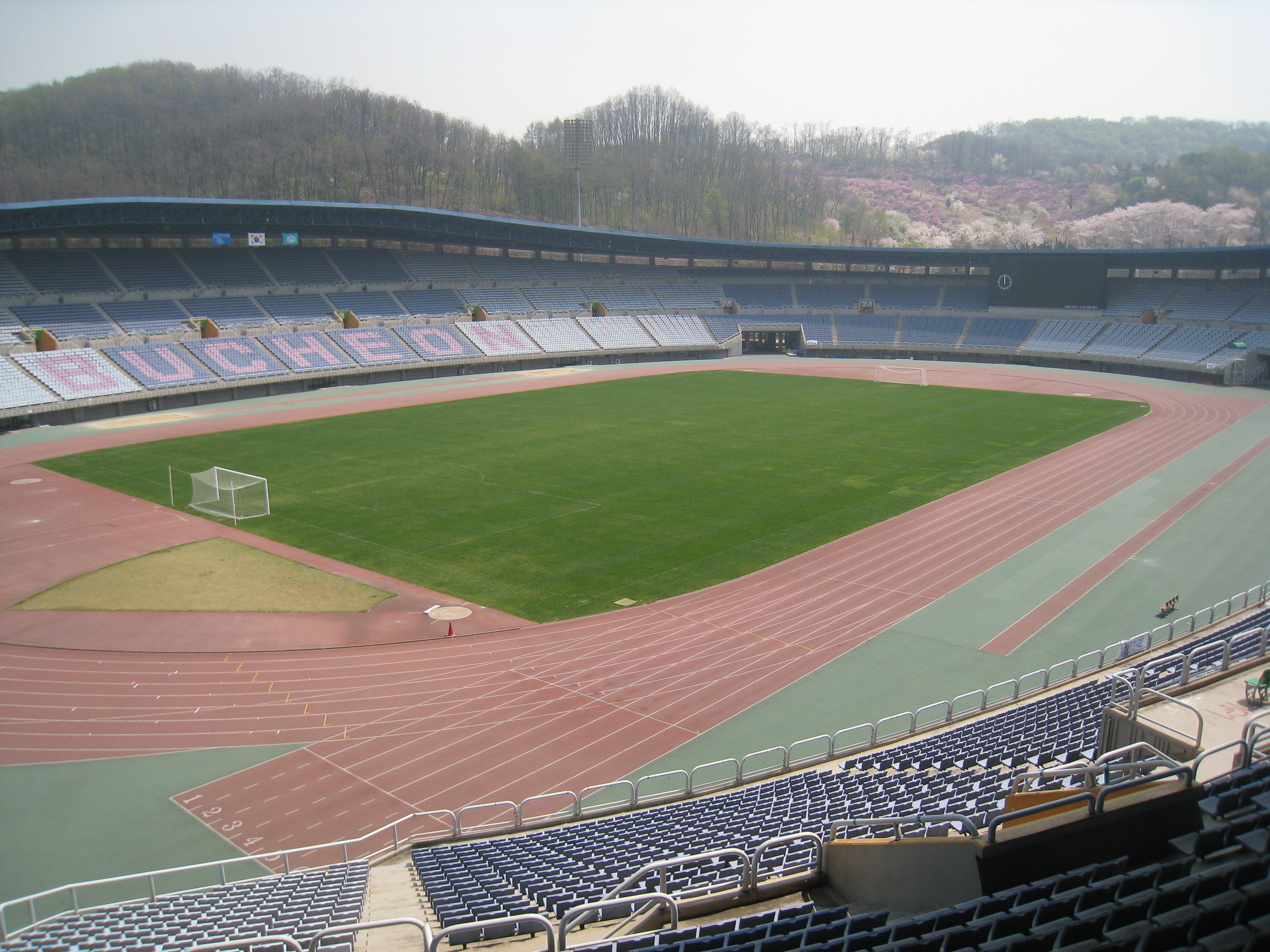
- Interactive map of Bucheon Stadium
- Location: Sosa-ro, Wonmi-gu, Bucheon, Gyeonggi-do, South Korea
- Coordinates: 37°30′09″N 126°47′57″E
- Owner: Bucheon City Hall
- Operator: Bucheon City Environment Satisfaction Technology
- Capacity: 34,456
- Surface: Grass
- Field size: 110 by 70 metres (120 by 77 yards)

Construction
- Opened: 25 March 2001

Tenants
- Bucheon SK (2001–2005); Bucheon FC 1995 (2008–present)

Bucheon Stadium (Korean: 부천종합운동장) is a multi-purpose stadium in Bucheon, Gyeonggi-do, South Korea.

It is currently used mostly for football matches and has been the home stadium of Bucheon FC 1995 since 2008. The stadium has a seating capacity for 34,456 spectators and was opened in 2001.
