= Almir (footballer, born 1985) =

Brazilian footballer

Personal information
- Full name: Jose Almir Barros Neto
- Date of birth: August 22, 1985 (age 41)
- Place of birth: Quixadá, Brazil
- Height: 1.76 m (5 ft 9 in)
- Position: Forward

Team information
- Current team: Negeri Sembilan
- Number: 9

Senior career*
Years	Team	Apps	(Gls)
2008	Gyeongnam FC	7	(1)
2009	Goiás	0	(0)
2009–2011	Campinense	18	(0)
2011	Icasa	6	(0)
2012	Camboriú	0	(0)
2012	Vila Nova-GO	2	(0)
2013	América-TO	0	(0)
2013	Central	0	(0)
2013	Goyang Hi FC	18	(6)
2014	Ulsan Hyundai	2	(0)
2014	→ Gangwon FC (loan)	12	(3)
2015	Bucheon FC 1995	28	(1)
2016	Nakhon Pathom United	0	(8)
2017	ASSU	0	(0)
2017	Krabi	13	(3)
2018	Sisaket	0	(0)
2019–	Negeri Sembilan	0	(2)
- * Club domestic league appearances and goals as of 22 June 2017

Jose Almir Barros Neto, known as Almir is Brazilian footballer who currently plays for Negeri Sembilan.
