= Chungju Public Stadium =

Stadium in Chungju, South Korea

Coordinates: 36.95811°N 127.91579°E

- Interactive map of Chungju Public Stadium
- Location: 500, Kyohyeon 1-dong, Chungju, Chungcheongbuk-do, South Korea
- Operator: Chungju City Sports Facilities Management Office
- Capacity: 15,000

Construction
- Groundbreaking: 1968
- Opened: 1979

Tenant
- Chungju Hummel FC (2010–2016)

Chungju Public Stadium (Korean: 충주공설운동장) is a sports complex and training ground in Chungju, South Korea. The stadium opened in 1979 and holds around 15,000 people. It is used mostly for football matches and athletics.

It was the home of K League Challenge side Chungju Hummel FC between 2010 and 2016.
