= Catholic Kwandong University =

University in Gangneung, South Korea

Coordinates: 37°44′11″N 128°52′18″E

- 가톨릭관동대학교
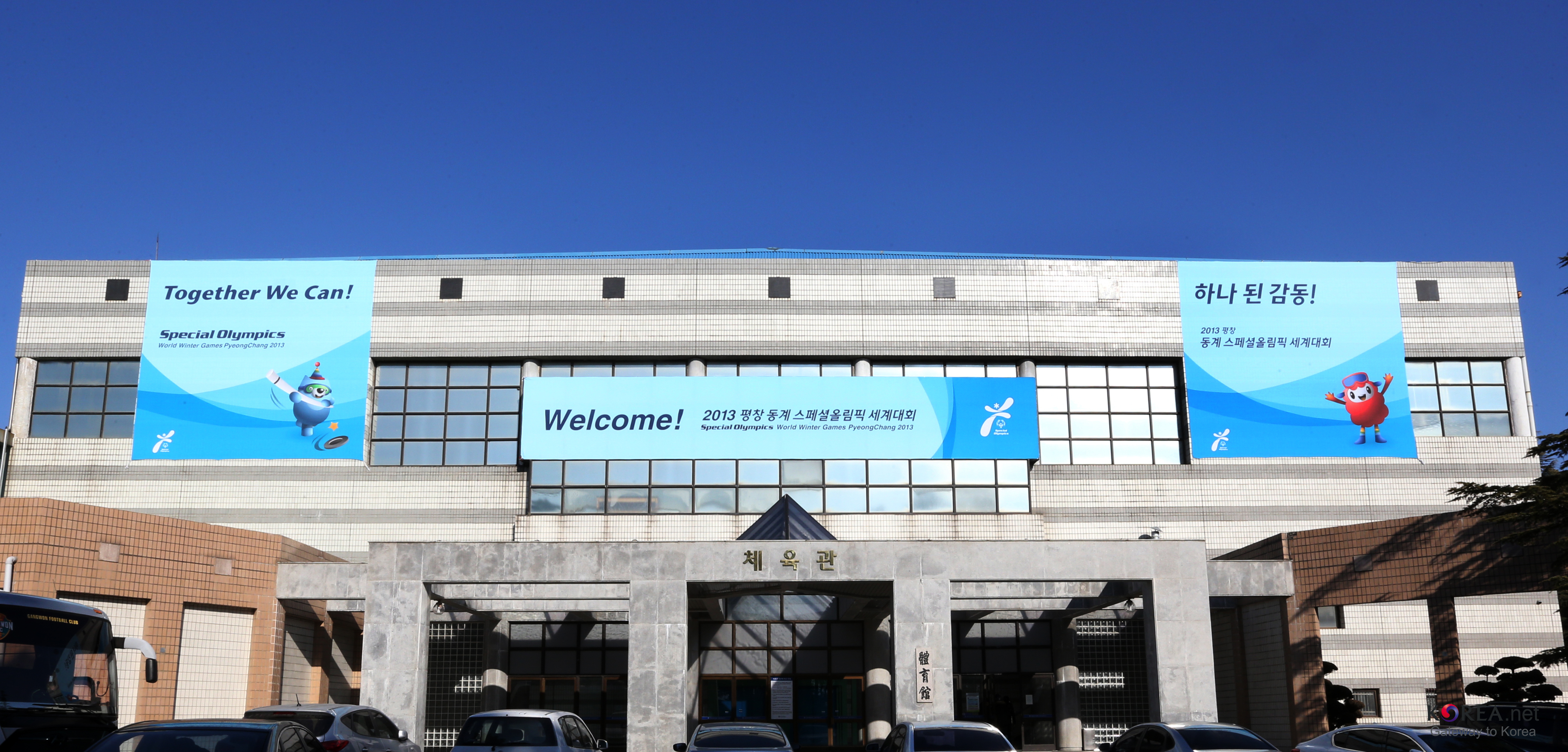
- Type: Private
- Established: 31 May 1954
- Founders: Jong-myeong Lee 이종명
- Religious affiliation: Catholic Church
- President: Yong-seung Kim 김용승
- Academic staff: 410
- Administrative staff: 374
- Undergraduates: 10,959 (2022)
- Postgraduates: 493 (2022)
- Location: South Korea

- Catholic Kwandong University
- Hangul: 가톨릭관동대학교
- Hanja: 가톨릭關東大學校
- RR: Gatollik Gwandong daehakgyo
- MR: Kat'ollik Kwandong taehakkyo

Catholic Kwandong University (Korean: 가톨릭관동대학교) is a private Roman Catholic University located in Gangneung, Gangwon-do, South Korea.

The Kwandong Hockey Centre is on its grounds.

== History ==
- 31 May 1954 - Kwandong University Foundation was established.
- 28 February 1955 - Kwandong University Hospital was created.
- 26 February 26, 1959 - promoted to a 4-year program University.
- 12 December 1972 - Merged with Myongji University.
- 1995 - Yangyang Campus opened in 1995 but closed in 2008.
- 31 August 2014 - due to financial difficulties, Myeongji University ceased operating Kwandong University.
- 1 September 2014 - reopened as Catholic Kwandong University, under the supervision of the Diocese of Incheon, who provided ₩104.5 billion (US$91.35 million) to aid with the transition.

== Notable people ==
- Xiumin (Exo)
- Park Gwang-hyun
