= Chungju Hummel FC =

Defunct association football club in South Korea

Chungju Hummel FC 충주 험멜 FC
- Full name: Chungju Hummel Football Club 충주 험멜 프로축구단
- Nickname: Bee
- Founded: 1999; 27 years ago (as Hummel FC)
- Dissolved: 2016; 10 years ago
- Ground: Chungju Stadium
- Capacity: 15,000
Home colours	Away colours

Chungju Hummel Football Club (Korean: 충주 험멜 FC) was a South Korean professional football club based in the city of Chungju in the Chungcheongbuk-do province. The club was based in Icheon from 2006 to 2007, and prior to that in Uijeongbu. Chungju Hummel played in the K League between 2013 and 2016, but was dissolved after the 2016 season, reportedly due to financial issues, including a lack of support from Chungju City.

== Club name history ==
- 1999: Founded as Hummel Korea FC
- 2003: Renamed Uijeongbu Hummel FC
- 2006: Renamed Icheon Hummel FC
- 2008: Renamed Nowon Hummel FC
- 2010: Renamed Chungju Hummel FC

== Managers ==
No.	Name	From	To	Season	Notes
1	(South Korea) Jung Byung-ok	1999/12/09	2002/12/31	2000–02	First manager
2	(South Korea) Park Young-hwan	2003/01/01	2006/12/31	2003–06	
3	(South Korea) Lee Sang-jae	2007/01/01	2011/12/31	2007–11	
4	(South Korea) Lee Jae-cheol	2012/01/01	2013/06/19	2012–13	
C	(South Korea) Min Dong-sung	2013/06/20	2013/07/21	2013	
5	(South Korea) Kim Jong-pil	2013/07/24	2015/12/30	2013–15	
6	(South Korea) Ahn Seung-in	2015/12/30	2016/12/31	2016	

== Records ==
Season	Division	Tms.	Pos.	FA Cup	AFC CL
2003	National	10	6	—	—
2004	National	10	8	—	—
2005	National	11	8	First round	—
2006	National	11	10	First round	—
2007	National	12	8	First round	—
2008	National	14	11	First round	—
2009	National	14	12	First round	—
2010	National	15	8	Round of 32	—
2011	National	14	14	Round of 32	—
2012	National	14	12	Round of 32	—
2013	Challenge	8	8	Round of 32	—
2014	Challenge	10	9	Second round	—
2015	Challenge	11	11	Round of 16	—
2016	Challenge	11	10	Third round	—

Key

- Tms. = Number of teams
- Pos. = Position in league

== Crest ==
1999–2012

2013–2016

== See also ==
- List of football clubs in South Korea
- Hummel International
