= FC Anyang =

South Korean football club

- Full name: Football Club Anyang 안양시민프로축구단
- Founded: 2 February 2013; 13 years ago
- Ground: Anyang Sports Complex
- Capacity: 17,143
- Owner: Anyang City
- President: Choi Dae-ho (Mayor of Anyang)
- Manager: Ryu Byeong-hoon
- League: K League 1
- 2025: K League 1, 8th of 12
- Website: fc-anyang.com
Home colours	Away colours

FC Anyang (Korean: FC 안양) is a South Korean professional football club based in Anyang that competes in the K League 1, the top tier of the South Korean football league system.

The club play their home games at Anyang Sports Complex.

== History ==
=== Football in Anyang ===
Following the implementation of the K League decentralization policy in 1995, the three Seoul-based teams had to relocate to other regions. In 1996, LG Cheetahs relocated to Anyang City to become Anyang LG Cheetahs.

After the 2002 FIFA World Cup, co-hosted by South Korea, Seoul's World Cup Stadium stood empty, except for occasional international matches. The Seoul Metropolitan Government sought to offset construction and maintenance cost by creating a new team in Seoul.

Unable to find a company to establish a new team, the city of Seoul proposed bringing an existing team to the capital. In 2004, it was announced that the Anyang LG Cheetahs would be the new occupants of the World Cup Stadium, and now become known as FC Seoul.

LG Cheetahs did not leave Anyang and the fans on good terms. These events helped to shape the FC Anyang supporters' identity and explains the basis for their dislike of FC Seoul.

=== Foundation of FC Anyang ===
With the creation of the K League 2, the city of Anyang saw the opportunity to bring football back. Despite opposition from within the city council, an ordinance was passed on 10 October 2012 to establish a professional football team in Anyang City. The public was invited to vote and on 27 December 2012, the chosen name was confirmed as FC Anyang. The club was officially founded on 2 February 2013.

FC Anyang played their first game on 17 March 2013 against Goyang Hi at Anyang Stadium. The match ended 1–1, with Ka Sol-hyun scoring the club's first ever goal. The club recorded its first win on 7 April against Chungju Hummel.

In 2024, the club won their first piece of silverware by winning the 2024 K League 2, earning direct promotion to the top flight K League 1 for the first time in the club's history.

== Supporters and rivalries ==
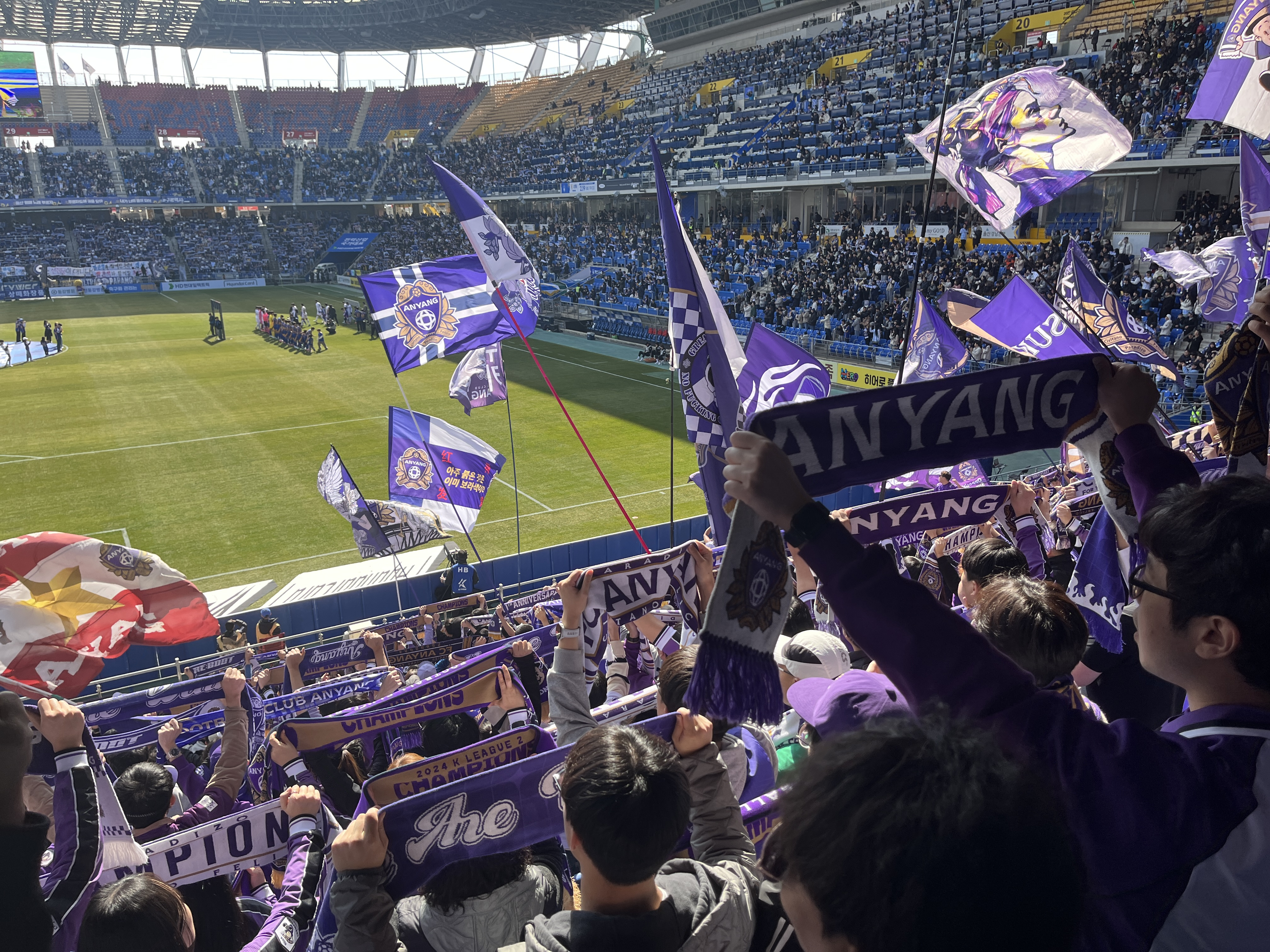
Anyang fans at the club's first ever match in K League 1, against Ulsan HD at the Munsu World Cup Stadium

The club's main supporters group is called A.S.U. RED, which started as a fan group for Anyang LG Cheetahs (now FC Seoul) when the club was based in Anyang.

The club shares a strong rivalry with nearby Suwon Samsung Bluewings, a rivalry that began during the LG Cheetahs era and was dubbed the Jijidae Derby. Despite the LG Cheetahs changing their name and location, the city of Anyang still share a football rivalry with Suwon, which was revived in the 2024 season when Suwon Samsung Bluewings competed in the second division for the first time.

FC Seoul is another club disliked by FC Anyang fans, due to the abrupt manner of the club leaving the city despite protests. Anyang fans lit flares in a show of defiance in a tie in the 2017 Korean FA Cup.

== Players ==
=== Current squad ===
As of 19 October 2026

Note: Flags indicate national team as defined under FIFA eligibility rules; some limited exceptions apply. Players may hold more than one non-FIFA nationality.

No.	Pos.	Nation	Player
1	GK	KOR	Jeong Min-jae
3	DF	KOR	Kim Ji-hoon
4	DF	KOR	Lee Chang-yong (captain)
5	DF	KOR	Kim Young-chan
6	MF	KOR	Kang Ji-wan
7	MF	BRA	Matheus Oliveira
8	MF	KOR	Kim Jeong-hyun
9	FW	BRA	Breno Herculano (on loan from CRB)
10	FW	BIH	Ivan Jukić
11	FW	BRA	Airton
13	MF	KOR	Han Ga-ram (vice-captain)
14	MF	KOR	Moon Seong-woo
15	FW	KOR	Park Jeong-hoon
17	DF	KOR	Kang Ji-hoon
18	MF	SRB	Branislav Knežević
19	FW	KOR	Kim Woon
20	FW	KOR	Yu Jeong-wan
21	DF	KOR	Kwon Kyung-won

No.	Pos.	Nation	Player
22	DF	KOR	Kim Dong-jin (vice-captain)
23	GK	KOR	Kim Jeong-hoon
24	MF	KOR	Kim Bo-kyung
25	DF	KOR	Kim Jae-hyeon
26	MF	KOR	Lee Jin-yong
27	FW	KOR	Choi Geon-ju
28	FW	CMR	Blaise Tsague
31	GK	KOR	Kim Da-sol
32	DF	KOR	Lee Tae-hee
33	DF	NED	Danny Bakker
42	GK	KOR	Kim Sung-dong
47	FW	KOR	Kim Gang
66	DF	KOR	Park Jong-hyun
70	FW	KOR	Oh Hyeong-jun
71	FW	KOR	Chae Hyun-woo
77	MF	KOR	Jang Jung-woo
99	DF	KOR	Joo Hyeon-woo

=== Out on loan and military service ===
Note: Flags indicate national team as defined under FIFA eligibility rules; some limited exceptions apply. Players may hold more than one non-FIFA nationality.

No.	Pos.	Nation	Player
—	GK	KOR	Kim Tae-hoon (at Gyeongnam FC)
—	DF	KOR	Hong Jae-seok (at Daegu FC)
—	MF	KOR	Choi Kyu-hyun (at Gimcheon Sangmu for military service)

No.	Pos.	Nation	Player
—	FW	KOR	Choi Sung-beom (at Gimpo FC)
—	FW	KOR	Lee Dong-hyun (at Changwon City)
—	FW	BRA	Bruno Mota (at Jeonbuk Hyundai Motors)

== Backroom staff ==
=== Coaching staff ===
- Manager: (South Korea) Ryu Byeong-hoon
- Head coach: (South Korea) Kwon Woo-kyung
- Goalkeeping coach: (South Korea) Choi Ik-hyung
- Coach: (South Korea) Joo Hyun-jae
- Physical coach: (South Korea) Kim Hyung-rok
- Playing coach: (South Korea) Jeong Jun-yeon

=== Support staff ===
- Analyst: (South Korea) Kim Seong-ju, (South Korea) Jung Hyo-in
- Medical team leader: (South Korea) Seo Jun-seok
- Athletic trainers: (South Korea) Hwang Hee-seok, (South Korea) Shin Young-jae
- Equipment manager: (South Korea) Joo Jong-hwan
- Team manager: (South Korea) Choi Woo-hyun
- Interpreter: (South Korea) An Jae-mo
- Administrative director: (South Korea) Jo Hae-won
- Technical director: (South Korea) Lim Wan-seop
- Scout: (South Korea) Kim Hyo-gi
- Youth director: (South Korea) Choi Jae-hyung

Source: Official website

== Honours ==
- K League 2
  - Winners (1): 2024

== Season-by-season records ==
Year	League										Korean Cup	Top scorer (league only)	
Year	Division	P	W	D	L	GF	GA	Pts	Pos	Playoffs	Korean Cup	Player	Goals
2013	Challenge	35	12	9	14	50	51	45	5/8	—	Round of 32	Park Sung-jin	7
2014	Challenge	36	15	6	15	49	52	51	5/10	—	Round of 32	Kim Jae-woong; Park Sung-jin	7
2015	Challenge	40	13	15	12	53	52	54	6/11	—	Round of 32	An Sung-bin; Kim Hyo-gi	8
2016	Challenge	40	11	13	16	40	53	46	9/11	—	Round of 32	Kim Min-kyun	11
2017	Challenge	36	10	9	17	40	58	39	7/10	—	Round of 32	Jeong Jae-hee	8
2018	K League 2	36	12	8	16	44	50	44	6/10	—	Round of 32	Alex	15
2019	K League 2	36	15	10	11	63	50	55	3/10	PO Final	Round of 16	Cho Gue-sung	14
2020	K League 2	27	6	7	14	27	38	25	9/10	—	Third round	Maxwell Acosty	7
2021	K League 2	36	17	11	8	51	37	62	2/10	PO Final	Round of 16	Jonathan Moya	13
2022	K League 2	40	19	12	9	52	41	69	3/11	PR Final	Third round	Jonathan Moya	9
2023	K League 2	36	15	9	12	58	51	54	6/13	—	Second round	Andrigo; Park Jae-yong; Yago	6
2024	K League 2	36	18	9	9	51	36	63	1/13	—	Third round	Matheus Oliveira	7
2025	K League 1	38	14	7	17	49	47	49	8/12	—	Round of 16	Bruno Mota	14
