= Yang Han-been =

South Korean footballer (born 1991)

Yang Han-been 양한빈
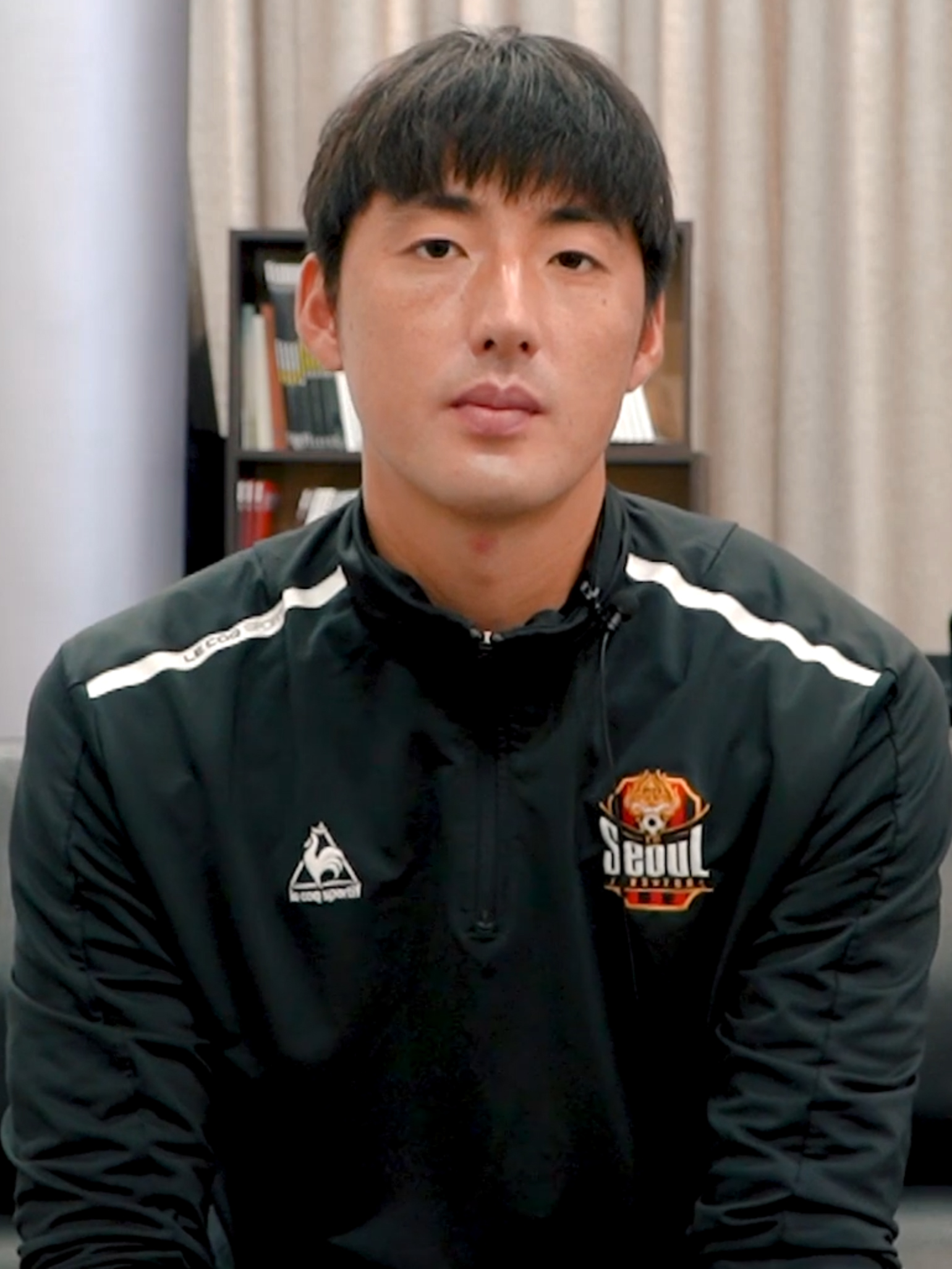
- Yang in October 2020

Personal information
- Full name: Yang Han-been
- Date of birth: 30 August 1991 (age 35)
- Place of birth: South Korea
- Height: 1.95 m (6 ft 5 in)
- Position: Goalkeeper

Team information
- Current team: Suwon FC
- Number: 21

Youth career
- 2004–2005: Pohang Jecheol Middle School
- 2006: Daeryun Middle School
- 2007–2009: Yongin Football Center (Baekahm)

Senior career*
Years	Team	Apps	(Gls)
2010–2012	Gangwon FC	1	(0)
2013–2014	Seongnam Ilhwa Chunma	1	(0)
2014–2022	FC Seoul	158	(0)
2023–2025	Cerezo Osaka	13	(0)
2025	Sagan Tosu	4	(0)
2025	Seongnam FC	24	(0)
2026–	Suwon FC	15	(0)

International career^{‡}
2009–2011	South Korea U-20	2	(0)
2010–2012	South Korea U-23	4	(0)
- * Club domestic league appearances and goals as of 5 August 2026 ‡ National team caps and goals as of 26 May 2012

Yang Han-been (Korean: 양한빈; born 30 August 1991) is a South Korean professional footballer who plays as a goalkeeper for K League 2 club Suwon FC.

== Club career ==
Yang started his career with Gangwon FC.

In 2013, Yang transferred to Seongnam Ilhwa Chunma.

In 2014, Yang signed to FC Seoul.

In 2023, Yang joined J1 League club Cerezo Osaka, which is his first overseas club experience.

== Career statistics ==
As of 30 October 2022.

Club performance			League		Cup		League Cup		Continental		Other		Total	
Season	Club	League	Apps	Goals	Apps	Goals	Apps	Goals	Apps	Goals	Apps	Goals	Apps	Goals
South Korea			League		Cup		League Cup		AFC		Play-off		Total	
2011	Gangwon FC	K League 1	0	0	0	0	0	0	—		—		0	0
2012	Gangwon FC	K League 1	1	0	1	0	0	0	—		—		2	0
2013	Seongnam Ilhwa Chunma	K League 1	1	0	0	0	—		—		—		1	0
2014	FC Seoul	K League 1	0	0	0	0	—		0	0	—		0	0
2015	FC Seoul	K League 1	0	0	0	0	—		0	0	—		0	0
2016	FC Seoul	K League 1	0	0	0	0	—		0	0	—		0	0
2017	FC Seoul	K League 1	27	0	0	0	—		1	0	—		28	0
2018	FC Seoul	K League 1	37	0	2	0	—		—		2	0	41	0
2019	FC Seoul	K League 1	7	0	0	0	—		—		—		7	0
2020	FC Seoul	K League 1	16	0	0	0	—		3	0	—		19	0
2021	FC Seoul	K League 1	36	0	1	0	—		—		—		37	0
2022	FC Seoul	K League 1	35	0	6	0	—		—		—		41	0
Japan			League		Cup		League Cup		AFC		Play-off		Total	
2023	Cerezo Osaka	J1 League	0	0	0	0	0	0	—		—		0	0
Total	South Korea		160	0	10	0	0	0	4	0	2	0	176	0
Total	Japan		0	0	0	0	0	0	0	0	0	0	0	0
Career total			160	0	10	0	0	0	4	0	2	0	176	0
