= 2016 K League Classic =

34th season of top-tier football league in South Korea

Hyundai Oilbank K League Classic
- Season: 2016
- Dates: 12 March – 6 November 2016
- Champions: FC Seoul (6th title)
- Relegated: Seongnam FC; Suwon FC
- Champions League: FC Seoul; Jeju United; Suwon Samsung Bluewings; Ulsan Hyundai
- Matches: 228
- Goals: 618 (2.71 per match)
- Best Player: Jung Jo-gook
- Top goalscorer: Jung Jo-gook (20 goals)
- Biggest home win: Seoul 4–0 Sangju (20 March 2016); Sangju 4–0 Jeju (15 June 2016); Pohang 4–0 Ulsan (29 June 2016)
- Biggest away win: Jeonnam 0–5 Jeonbuk (2 November 2016)
- Highest scoring: Suwon 4–5 Suwon FC (2 October 2016)
- Highest attendance: 47,899; Seoul 1–1 Suwon (18 June 2016)
- Lowest attendance: 923; Sangju 0–1 Jeonnam (16 October 2016)
- Average attendance: 7,873

The 2016 K League Classic was the 34th season of the top division of South Korean professional football since its establishment in 1983, and the fourth season of the K League Classic.

== Teams ==
Locations of the 2016 K League Classic clubs

=== General information ===
Club	City/Province	Manager	Owner(s)	Other sponsor(s)
Gwangju FC	Gwangju	(South Korea) Nam Ki-il	Gwangju Government	
Incheon United	Incheon	(South Korea) Lee Ki-hyung (caretaker)	Incheon Government	Shinhan Bank; Incheon International Airport
Jeju United	Jeju	(South Korea) Jo Sung-hwan	SK Energy	
Jeonbuk Hyundai Motors	Jeonbuk	(South Korea) Choi Kang-hee	Hyundai Motor Company	
Jeonnam Dragons	Jeonnam	(South Korea) Roh Sang-rae	POSCO	
Pohang Steelers	Pohang, Gyeongbuk	(South Korea) Choi Jin-cheul	POSCO	
Sangju Sangmu	Sangju, Gyeongbuk	(South Korea) Cho Jin-ho	Korea Armed Forces Athletic Corps	
Seongnam FC	Seongnam, Gyeonggi	(South Korea) Kim Hak-bum	Seongnam Government	
FC Seoul	Seoul	(South Korea) Choi Yong-soo	GS Group	
Suwon FC	Suwon, Gyeonggi	(South Korea) Cho Duck-je	Suwon Government	
Suwon Samsung Bluewings	Suwon, Gyeonggi	(South Korea) Seo Jung-won	Cheil Worldwide	Samsung Electronics; Maeil Dairies Industry
Ulsan Hyundai	Ulsan	(South Korea) Yoon Jung-hwan	Hyundai Heavy Industries	

=== Stadiums ===
Gwangju FC	Incheon United	Jeju United	Jeonbuk Hyundai Motors	Jeonnam Dragons	Pohang Steelers
Gwangju World Cup Stadium	Incheon Football Stadium	Jeju World Cup Stadium	Jeonju World Cup Stadium	Gwangyang Football Stadium	Pohang Steel Yard
Capacity: **40,245**	Capacity: **20,891**	Capacity: **35,657**	Capacity: **42,477**	Capacity: **13,496**	Capacity: **17,443**
Sangju Sangmu	Seongnam FC	FC Seoul	Suwon FC	Suwon Samsung Bluewings	Ulsan Hyundai
Sangju Civic Stadium	Tancheon Stadium	Seoul World Cup Stadium	Suwon Sports Complex	Suwon World Cup Stadium	Ulsan Munsu Football Stadium
Capacity: **15,042**	Capacity: **16,146**	Capacity: **66,704**	Capacity: **11,808**	Capacity: **44,031**	Capacity: **44,102**

=== Managerial changes ===
Team	Outgoing	Manner	Date	Incoming	Date	Table
Pohang Steelers	(South Korea) Hwang Sun-hong	End of contract	30 November 2015	(South Korea) Choi Jin-cheul	30 November 2015	Pre-season
Sangju Sangmu	(South Korea) Park Hang-seo	End of contract	11 December 2015	(South Korea) Cho Jin-ho	17 December 2015	Pre-season
FC Seoul	(South Korea) Choi Yong-soo	Resigned	21 June 2016	(South Korea) Kim Seong-jae (caretaker)	21 June 2016	2nd
FC Seoul	(South Korea) Kim Seong-jae (caretaker)	Caretaker	25 June 2016	(South Korea) Hwang Sun-hong	26 June 2016	2nd
Incheon United	(South Korea) Kim Do-hoon	Resigned	31 August 2016	(South Korea) Lee Ki-hyung (caretaker)	31 August 2016	12th
Pohang Steelers	(South Korea) Choi Jin-cheul	Resigned	24 September 2016	(South Korea) Choi Soon-ho	26 September 2016	9th
Jeju United	(South Korea) Jo Sung-hwan	Assigned as assistant	14 October 2016	(South Korea) Kim In-soo	14 October 2016	3rd
Jeonnam Dragons	(South Korea) Roh Sang-rae	Assigned as assistant	14 October 2016	(South Korea) Song Kyung-sub	14 October 2016	5th

=== Foreign players ===
Restricting the number of foreign players strictly to four per team, including a slot for a player from AFC countries. A team could use four foreign players on the field each game including a least one player from the AFC confederation. Players name in bold indicates the player is registered during the mid-season transfer window.

Club	Player 1	Player 2	Player 3	Asian player	Former players
Gwangju FC	(Niger) **Olivier Bonnes**			(Japan) Tomoki Wada	(Brazil) Fábio Neves (Brazil) Wellington
Incheon United	(Belgium) Kevin Oris	(Croatia) Matej Jonjić	(North Macedonia) Krste Velkoski	(Vietnam) Lương Xuân Trường	
Jeju United	(Brazil) **Henan**	(Brazil) Marcelo Toscano	(Brazil) **Wanderson Carvalho**		(Brazil) Fernando Karanga (Brazil) Moisés
Jeonbuk Hyundai Motors	(Brazil) **Edu**	(Brazil) Leonardo	(Brazil) Ricardo Lopes		(Australia) Erik Paartalu (Brazil) Luiz Henrique
Jeonnam Dragons	(Brazil) **Jair**	(Brazil) **Maurinho**	(Croatia) Vedran Jugović	(Australia) **Tomislav Mrčela**	(Croatia) Mislav Oršić (North Macedonia) Stevica Ristić
Pohang Steelers	(Brazil) **Lulinha**	(Brazil) **Muralha**	(Serbia) Lazar Veselinović	(Iraq) **Ali Abbas**	
Seongnam FC	(Argentina) Pitu	(Brazil) **Silvinho**			(Brazil) Tiago Alves
FC Seoul	(Brazil) Adriano Michael Jackson	(Montenegro) Dejan Damjanović	(Spain) Osmar	(Japan) Yojiro Takahagi	
Suwon FC	(Australia) **Bruce Djite**	(Montenegro) Vladan Adžić	(Spain) Jaime Gavilán	(Australia) Adrian Leijer	(Belgium) Marvin Ogunjimi
Suwon Samsung Bluewings	(Brazil) **Johnathan**	(Brazil) Júnior Santos	(Netherlands) **Romeo Castelen**		(Brazil) Hygor
Ulsan Hyundai	(Brazil) **Célio Santos**	(Croatia) Ivan Kovačec	(Guinea-Bissau) **Frédéric Mendy**	(Japan) Chikashi Masuda	(Brazil) Bernardo

== League table ==
Pos	Team	Pld	W	D	L	GF	GA	GD	Pts	Qualification or relegation
1	FC Seoul (C)	38	21	7	10	67	46	+21	70	Qualification for Champions League group stage
2	Jeonbuk Hyundai Motors (Note: Jeonbuk Hyundai Motors were deducted 9 points and were excluded from the next Champions League due to bribery scandal.)	38	20	16	2	71	40	+31	67	
3	Jeju United	38	17	8	13	71	57	+14	59	Qualification for Champions League group stage
4	Ulsan Hyundai	38	14	12	12	41	47	−6	54	Qualification for Champions League play-off round
5	Jeonnam Dragons	38	12	11	15	44	53	−9	47	
6	Sangju Sangmu	38	12	7	19	54	65	−11	43	
7	Suwon Samsung Bluewings	38	10	18	10	56	59	−3	48	Qualification for Champions League group stage (Note: Qualified as champions of FA Cup.)
8	Gwangju FC	38	11	14	13	41	45	−4	47	
9	Pohang Steelers	38	12	10	16	43	46	−3	46	
10	Incheon United	38	11	12	15	43	51	−8	45	
11	Seongnam FC (R)	38	11	10	17	47	51	−4	43	Qualification for relegation play-offs
12	Suwon FC (R)	38	10	9	19	40	58	−18	39	Relegation to K League Challenge

Source: K League
Rules for classification: 1) Points; 2) Goals scored; 3) Goal difference; 4) Wins; 5) Head-to-head points
(C) Champions; (R) Relegated

== Positions by matchday ==
Leaders
Qualification for Champions League
Qualification for relegation play-offs
Relegation to K League Challenge

=== Round 1–33 ===
Team ╲ Round	1	2	3	4	5	6	7	8	9	10	11	12	13	14	15	16	17	18	19	20	21	22	23	24	25	26	27	28	29	30	31	32	33
Jeonbuk Hyundai Motors	4	4	2	3	3	2	2	2	2	2	2	1	1	1	1	1	1	1	1	1	1	1	1	1	1	1	1	1	1	1	1	1	1
FC Seoul	10	5	3	2	1	1	1	1	1	1	1	2	2	2	2	2	2	2	2	2	2	2	2	2	2	2	2	2	2	2	2	2	2
Jeju United	1	6	9	8	5	4	4	5	4	4	4	4	3	3	3	4	3	5	6	6	6	6	6	6	6	7	6	3	4	4	4	4	3
Ulsan Hyundai	11	11	8	4	4	5	8	6	8	8	5	5	5	5	4	3	4	3	3	3	3	3	5	4	3	4	4	5	3	3	3	3	4
Jeonnam Dragons	7	8	11	11	11	11	11	11	11	11	11	11	11	10	10	10	10	11	11	10	10	9	9	10	8	9	9	8	8	8	5	5	5
Sangju Sangmu	2	7	10	10	10	8	5	4	6	5	6	7	8	8	6	5	7	7	4	4	5	5	3	5	5	3	3	4	5	5	6	6	6
Seongnam FC	2	3	1	1	2	3	3	3	3	3	3	3	4	4	5	6	5	4	5	5	4	4	4	3	4	5	5	6	7	6	7	7	7
Pohang Steelers	5	1	5	6	7	10	10	8	5	6	8	8	7	7	8	7	6	6	7	7	7	7	7	7	9	8	8	9	9	10	10	9	8
Gwangju FC	5	2	6	9	9	7	7	9	7	9	7	6	6	6	7	8	8	8	8	8	8	8	8	8	7	6	7	7	6	7	8	8	9
Suwon Samsung Bluewings	11	10	7	7	8	6	6	7	9	7	9	9	9	9	9	9	9	9	9	9	9	10	10	9	10	10	10	10	10	9	9	10	10
Incheon United	9	12	12	12	12	12	12	12	12	12	12	12	12	11	11	11	11	10	10	11	11	11	11	11	11	11	11	12	12	12	11	11	11
Suwon FC	7	9	4	5	6	9	9	10	10	10	10	10	10	12	12	12	12	12	12	12	12	12	12	12	12	12	12	11	11	11	12	12	12

Source: K League

=== Round 34–38 ===
Team ╲ Round	34	35	36	37	38
FC Seoul	2	2	2	2	1
Jeonbuk Hyundai Motors	1	1	1	1	2
Jeju United	3	3	3	3	3
Ulsan Hyundai	4	4	4	4	4
Jeonnam Dragons	5	5	5	5	5
Sangju Sangmu	6	6	6	6	6
Suwon Samsung Bluewings	10	10	8	7	7
Gwangju FC	7	7	7	8	8
Pohang Steelers	9	9	10	10	9
Incheon United	11	11	11	11	10
Seongnam FC	8	8	9	9	11
Suwon FC	12	12	12	12	12

Source: K League

== Results ==
=== Matches 1–22 ===
Teams play each other twice, once at home, once away.

Home \ Away	GWJ	ICU	JJU	JHM	JND	PHS	SJS	SEN	SEO	SUW	SSB	USH
Gwangju FC	—	2–2	1–0	1–1	0–0	0–1	1–0	1–1	1–2	1–0	1–1	0–2
Incheon United	0–1	—	2–1	0–0	0–0	0–2	1–0	2–3	1–2	2–0	1–1	0–1
Jeju United	3–2	3–1	—	1–2	3–0	3–1	4–2	2–2	3–2	0–0	2–2	1–2
Jeonbuk Hyundai Motors	3–0	1–1	2–1	—	2–1	3–0	3–2	3–2	1–0	3–1	2–1	2–1
Jeonnam Dragons	1–2	1–0	2–1	1–2	—	0–0	3–4	0–1	1–2	0–0	3–0	3–1
Pohang Steelers	3–3	3–1	1–0	1–1	0–1	—	0–2	3–1	2–1	0–1	2–2	4–0
Sangju Sangmu	0–4	4–2	4–0	2–2	3–2	2–0	—	2–3	2–1	1–1	0–1	2–0
Seongnam FC	2–0	0–1	0–0	2–2	0–0	1–0	2–3	—	2–3	1–2	2–0	0–1
FC Seoul	3–2	3–1	3–4	2–3	1–1	1–3	4–0	1–3	—	3–0	1–1	0–0
Suwon FC	2–1	0–0	2–5	2–2	1–2	1–0	0–3	1–1	0–3	—	1–2	1–1
Suwon Samsung Bluewings	0–2	2–2	1–0	2–3	2–2	1–1	2–1	1–2	1–1	1–0	—	2–4
Ulsan Hyundai	3–2	1–3	0–1	0–0	2–1	0–0	1–0	0–3	1–2	1–0	2–1	—

Source: K League
Legend: Blue = home team win; Yellow = draw; Red = away team win.

=== Matches 23–33 ===
Teams play every other team once (either at home or away).

Home \ Away	GWJ	ICU	JJU	JHM	JND	PHS	SJS	SEN	SEO	SUW	SSB	USH
Gwangju FC	—	1–1	—	1–1	—	—	1–0	—	1–2	0–0	1–1	—
Incheon United	—	—	0–1	1–3	—	—	0–0	2–2	1–0	—	2–2	—
Jeju United	1–2	—	—	2–2	—	3–0	—	1–0	—	—	—	1–1
Jeonbuk Hyundai Motors	—	—	—	—	2–2	—	—	1–0	—	2–1	1–1	1–1
Jeonnam Dragons	2–0	2–1	0–2	—	—	2–1	1–0	—	1–4	—	—	—
Pohang Steelers	1–0	0–1	—	0–0	—	—	1–0	—	—	2–3	—	—
Sangju Sangmu	—	—	1–5	1–1	—	—	—	2–2	1–2	—	1–1	—
Seongnam FC	0–1	—	—	—	2–0	1–4	—	—	1–2	2–1	1–2	—
FC Seoul	—	—	0–0	1–3	—	2–0	—	—	—	—	1–0	2–2
Suwon FC	—	2–0	5–3	—	0–0	—	0–2	—	0–1	—	—	1–2
Suwon Samsung Bluewings	—	—	5–3	—	1–1	1–1	—	—	—	4–5	—	0–0
Ulsan Hyundai	1–1	2–3	—	—	0–2	1–0	2–3	2–1	—	—	—	—

Source: K League
Legend: Blue = home team win; Yellow = draw; Red = away team win.

=== Matches 34–38 ===
After 33 matches, the league splits into two sections of six teams each, with teams playing every other team in their section once (either at home or away). The exact matches are determined upon the league table at the time of the split.

==== Group A ====
Home \ Away	JJU	JHM	JND	SJS	SEO	USH
Jeju United	—	—	5–3	3–0	0–2	—
Jeonbuk Hyundai Motors	2–3	—	—	4–1	0–1	—
Jeonnam Dragons	—	0–5	—	—	—	1–1
Sangju Sangmu	—	—	0–1	—	—	1–2
FC Seoul	—	—	2–1	2–2	—	2–0
Ulsan Hyundai	0–0	0–0	—	—	—	—

Source: K League
Legend: Blue = home team win; Yellow = draw; Red = away team win.

==== Group B ====
Home \ Away	GWJ	ICU	PHS	SEN	SUW	SSB
Gwangju FC	—	—	1–1	0–0	—	—
Incheon United	2–0	—	3–2	—	1–0	—
Pohang Steelers	—	—	—	1–0	0–1	2–2
Seongnam FC	—	0–0	—	—	1–2	—
Suwon FC	1–2	—	—	—	—	2–3
Suwon Samsung Bluewings	1–1	3–2	—	2–0	—	—

Source: K League
Legend: Blue = home team win; Yellow = draw; Red = away team win.

== Relegation play-offs ==
The promotion-relegation play-offs were held between the winners of the 2016 K League Challenge play-offs and the 11th-placed club of the 2016 K League Classic. The winner on aggregate score after both matches earned entry into the 2017 K League Classic.

17 November 2016
19:00 KST

Gangwon FC	0–0	Seongnam FC
	Report

Gangneung Stadium, Gangneung
Attendance: 3,039
Referee: Kim Hee-gon

20 November 2016
15:00 KST

Seongnam FC	1–1	Gangwon FC
Hwang Jin-sung 77'		Han Seok-jong 42'

Tancheon Stadium, Seongnam
Attendance: 6,548
Referee: Kim Seong-ho

1–1 on aggregate. Gangwon FC won on away goals and were promoted to the K League Classic, while Seongnam FC were relegated to the K League Challenge.

== Player statistics ==
=== Top scorers ===
Rank	Player	Club	Goals
1	(South Korea) Jung Jo-gook	Gwangju FC	20
2	(Brazil) Adriano Michael Jackson	FC Seoul	17
3	(Brazil) Tiago Alves	Seongnam FC	13
3	(South Korea) Yang Dong-hyun	Pohang Steelers	13
3	(Brazil) Ricardo Lopes	Jeonbuk Hyundai Motors	13
3	(Montenegro) Dejan Damjanović	FC Seoul	13
7	(South Korea) Lee Dong-gook	Jeonbuk Hyundai Motors	12
7	(Brazil) Júnior Santos	Suwon Samsung Bluewings	12
7	(Brazil) Leonardo	Jeonbuk Hyundai Motors	12
10	(Brazil) Marcelo Toscano	Jeju United	11

=== Top assist providers ===
Rank	Player	Club	Assists
1	(South Korea) Yeom Ki-hun	Suwon Samsung Bluewings	15
2	(South Korea) Lee Jae-sung	Jeonbuk Hyundai Motors	11
3	(Belgium) Kevin Oris	Incheon United	10
4	(Croatia) Ivan Kovačec	Ulsan Hyundai	9
4	(Brazil) Marcelo Toscano	Jeju United	9
6	(South Korea) Sin Jin-ho	FC Seoul; Sangju Sangmu	8
6	(South Korea) Park Gi-dong	Sangju Sangmu; Jeonnam Dragons	8
6	(South Korea) Kim Min-hyeok	Gwangju FC	8
6	(South Korea) Kwon Soon-hyung	Jeju United	8
10	(South Korea) Yun Il-lok	FC Seoul	7
10	(South Korea) Kim Bo-kyung	Jeonbuk Hyundai Motors	7
10	(Argentina) Pitu	Seongnam FC	7

== Awards ==
=== Main awards ===
The 2016 K League Awards was held on 8 November 2016.

Award	Winner	Club
Most Valuable Player	(South Korea) Jung Jo-gook	Gwangju FC
Top goalscorer	(South Korea) Jung Jo-gook	Gwangju FC
Top assist provider	(South Korea) Yeom Ki-hun	Suwon Samsung Bluewings
Young Player of the Year	(South Korea) Ahn Hyun-beom	Jeju United
FANtastic Player	(Brazil) Leonardo	Jeonbuk Hyundai Motors
Manager of the Year	(South Korea) Hwang Sun-hong	FC Seoul
Fair Play Award	Jeju United	

=== Best XI ===
Position	Winner	Club
Goalkeeper	(South Korea) Kwon Sun-tae	Jeonbuk Hyundai Motors
Defenders	(South Korea) Chung Woon	Jeju United
Defenders	(Spain) Osmar	FC Seoul
Defenders	(Croatia) Matej Jonjić	Incheon United
Defenders	(South Korea) Ko Kwang-min	FC Seoul
Midfielders	(Brazil) Leonardo	Jeonbuk Hyundai Motors
Midfielders	(South Korea) Lee Jae-sung	Jeonbuk Hyundai Motors
Midfielders	(South Korea) Kwon Chang-hoon	Suwon Samsung Bluewings
Midfielders	(Brazil) Ricardo Lopes	Jeonbuk Hyundai Motors
Forwards	(South Korea) Jung Jo-gook	Gwangju FC
Forwards	(Brazil) Adriano Michael Jackson	FC Seoul

=== Player of the Round ===
Round	Winner	Club
1	(South Korea) Jung Jo-gook	Gwangju FC
2	(Brazil) Adriano Michael Jackson	FC Seoul
3	(Croatia) Ivan Kovačec	Ulsan Hyundai
4	(South Korea) Kim Chi-gon	Ulsan Hyundai
5	(South Korea) Ahn Hyun-beom	Jeju United
6	(South Korea) Kim Bo-kyung	Jeonbuk Hyundai Motors
7	(South Korea) Lee Keun-ho	Jeju United
8	(South Korea) Park Gi-dong	Sangju Sangmu
9	(South Korea) Yang Dong-hyun	Pohang Steelers
10	(South Korea) Ju Se-jong	FC Seoul
11	(Croatia) Ivan Kovačec	Ulsan Hyundai
12	(South Korea) Kim Yong-dae	Ulsan Hyundai
13	(Brazil) Tiago Alves	Seongnam FC
14	(Montenegro) Dejan Damjanović	FC Seoul
15	(South Korea) Lee Yong	Sangju Sangmu
16	(South Korea) Yang Dong-hyun	Pohang Steelers
17	(South Korea) Kim Min-hyeok	Gwangju FC
18	(Brazil) Tiago Alves	Seongnam FC
19	(South Korea) Kwon Chang-hoon	Suwon Samsung Bluewings

Round	Winner	Club
20	(Brazil) Ricardo Lopes	Jeonbuk Hyundai Motors
21	(Brazil) Ricardo Lopes	Jeonbuk Hyundai Motors
22	(South Korea) Yang Dong-hyun	Pohang Steelers
23	(South Korea) Yeom Ki-hun	Suwon Samsung Bluewings
24	(South Korea) Kweon Han-jin	Jeju United
25	(South Korea) Yun Il-lok	FC Seoul
26	(Montenegro) Dejan Damjanović	FC Seoul
27	(Montenegro) Dejan Damjanović	FC Seoul
28	(Brazil) Leonardo	Jeonbuk Hyundai Motors
29	(South Korea) Han Chan-hee	Jeonnam Dragons
30	(Guinea-Bissau) Frédéric Mendy	Ulsan Hyundai
31	(South Korea) Kim Shin-wook	Jeonbuk Hyundai Motors
32	(Brazil) Ricardo Lopes	Jeonbuk Hyundai Motors
33	(South Korea) Kim Byung-oh	Suwon FC
34	(South Korea) Jung Jo-gook	Gwangju FC
35	(South Korea) Ahn Hyun-beom	Jeju United
36	(Brazil) Ricardo Lopes	Jeonbuk Hyundai Motors
37	(South Korea) Lee Jae-sung	Jeonbuk Hyundai Motors
38	(South Korea) Park Chu-young	FC Seoul

=== Manager of the Month ===
Month	Manager	Club	Division
March/April	(South Korea) Choi Yong-soo	FC Seoul	K League Classic
May	(South Korea) Nam Ki-il	Gwangju FC	K League Classic
June	(South Korea) Lee Heung-sil	Ansan Mugunghwa	K League Challenge
July	(South Korea) Choi Kang-hee	Jeonbuk Hyundai Motors	K League Classic
August	(South Korea) Choi Young-jun	Busan IPark	K League Challenge
September	(South Korea) Choi Yun-kyum	Gangwon FC	K League Challenge
October	(South Korea) Hwang Sun-hong	FC Seoul	K League Classic

== Attendance ==
=== Attendance by club ===
Attendants who entered with free ticket are not counted.

Pos	Team	Total	High	Low	Average	Change
1	FC Seoul	342,134	47,889	5,011	18,007	+4.9%
2	Jeonbuk Hyundai Motors	318,921	33,706	8,022	16,785	−3.6%
3	Suwon Samsung Bluewings	202,214	28,109	4,042	10,643	−19.3%
4	Ulsan Hyundai	166,132	20,239	3,074	8,744	+39.3%
5	Pohang Steelers	145,937	16,509	3,711	7,681	−16.9%
6	Seongnam FC	127,860	14,504	2,968	6,729	+18.8%
7	Incheon United	121,068	14,246	2,829	6,053	+24.5%
8	Jeju United	108,208	15,341	1,850	5,695	−12.9%
9	Suwon FC	83,345	12,825	1,512	4,387	+223.8%^{†}
10	Jeonnam Dragons	78,169	12,808	1,245	4,114	−5.1%
11	Gwangju FC	66,031	10,638	926	3,475	+58.8%
12	Sangju Sangmu	34,976	4,783	923	1,943	+57.3%^{†}
	League total	1,794,995	47,889	923	7,873	+2.0%

Updated to games played on 6 November 2016
Source: K League
Notes:
^{†} Teams that played previous season in K League Challenge.

=== Top matches ===
Rank	Date	Round	Home	Score	Away	Venue	Attendance
1	18 June 2016	15	FC Seoul	1–1	Suwon Samsung Bluewings	Seoul World Cup Stadium	47,899
2	13 August 2016	25	FC Seoul	1–0	Suwon Samsung Bluewings	Seoul World Cup Stadium	36,309
3	6 November 2016	38	Jeonbuk Hyundai Motors	0–1	FC Seoul	Jeonju World Cup Stadium	33,706
4	12 March 2016	1	Jeonbuk Hyundai Motors	1–0	FC Seoul	Jeonju World Cup Stadium	32,695
5	30 April 2016	8	Suwon Samsung Bluewings	1–1	FC Seoul	Suwon World Cup Stadium	28,109
6	20 March 2016	2	FC Seoul	4–0	Sangju Sangmu	Seoul World Cup Stadium	25,950
7	28 August 2016	28	FC Seoul	1–3	Jeonbuk Hyundai Motors	Seoul World Cup Stadium	24,508
8	24 July 2016	22	Jeonbuk Hyundai Motors	2–1	Ulsan Hyundai	Jeonju World Cup Stadium	21,437
9	10 August 2016	24	Jeonbuk Hyundai Motors	2–1	Suwon FC	Jeonju World Cup Stadium	21,071
10	27 August 2016	28	Ulsan Hyundai	1–1	Gwangju FC	Ulsan Munsu Football Stadium	20,239

== See also ==
- 2016 in South Korean football
- 2016 K League Challenge
- 2016 Korean FA Cup
