= Ahn Hyeon-beom =

South Korean footballer (born 1994)

Personal information
- Full name: Ahn Hyeon-beom
- Date of birth: 21 December 1994 (age 31)
- Place of birth: Seoul, South Korea
- Height: 1.78 m (5 ft 10 in)
- Positions: Full-back; winger

Team information
- Current team: Busan IPark
- Number: 11

Youth career
- –2015: Dongguk University

Senior career*
Years	Team	Apps	(Gls)
2015	Ulsan Hyundai	17	(0)
2016–2023	Jeju United	165	(22)
2018–2019	→ Asan Mugunghwa (draft)	40	(5)
2023–2025	Jeonbuk Hyundai Motors	38	(3)
2025	→ Suwon FC (loan)	18	(1)
2026–	Busan IPark	11	(0)

International career^{‡}
2014–2015	South Korea U-23	6	(0)
2023–	South Korea	1	(0)
- * Club domestic league appearances and goals as of 5 August 2026 ‡ National team caps and goals as of 16 June 2023

- Ahn Hyeon-beom
- Hangul: 안현범
- Hanja: 安鉉範
- RR: An Hyeonbeom
- MR: An Hyŏnbŏm

Ahn Hyeon-beom (Korean: 안현범; Hanja: 安鉉範; born 21 December 1994) is a South Korean football player who plays for Busan IPark in K League 2.

== Early life ==
Ahn was born in Seoul. He studied at Dongguk University.

== Club career ==
Ahn joined Ulsan Hyundai in 2015 and made his league debut against FC Seoul on 8 March 2015.

In 2016, Ahn would join Jeju SK FC, (then called Jeju United) recording 165 appearances. While doing mandatory military service, Ahn played for Asan Mugunghwa although still under contract with Jeju.

Ahn joined Jeonbuk on a free from Jeju in 2023. He is currently on loan at Suwon FC.

== International career ==
He was a member of the South Korea national U-20 team for the 2015 Toulon Tournament.

Ahn Hyeon-beom was called up to the South Korea national football team in 2023, making his debut for the national side in a 1-0 loss against Peru, being substituted for Na Sang-ho in the 85th minute.

== Career statistics ==
=== Club ===
As of 24 August 2024

Club performance			League		Cup		Continental		Other		Total	
Season	Club	League	Apps	Goals	Apps	Goals	Apps	Goals	Apps	Goals	Apps	Goals
South Korea			League		Korean FA Cup		Asia		Other		Total	
2015	Ulsan Hyundai	K League 1	17	0	2	0	—		—		19	0
2016	Jeju United	K League 1	28	8	1	0	—		—		29	8
2017	Jeju United	K League 1	27	2	1	0	8	0	—		36	2
2018	Asan Mugunghwa (draft)	K League 2	27	5	2	1	—		—		29	6
2019	Asan Mugunghwa (draft)	K League 2	13	0	0	0	—		—		13	0
2019	Jeju United	K League 1	13	4	0	0	—		—		13	4
2020	Jeju United	K League 1	22	3	1	0	—		—		23	3
2021	Jeju United	K League 1	29	2	1	0	—		—		30	2
2022	Jeju United	K League 1	30	1	2	0	—		—		32	1
2023	Jeju United	K League 1	16	2	1	0	—		—		17	2
2023	Jeonbuk Hyundai Motors	K League 1	10	2	1	0	—		—		11	2
2024	Jeonbuk Hyundai Motors	K League 1	19	1	1	0	8 (Note: Appearances in 2023–24 AFC Champions League)	1	—		28	2
Country	South Korea		251	30	13	1	16	1	0	0	280	32
Career total			251	30	13	1	16	1	0	0	280	32

== Honours ==
=== Individual ===
- K League 2 Best XI (2): 2018, 2020
- K League Young Player of the Year: 2016
