= Lee Yong (footballer, born 1986) =

South Korean footballer

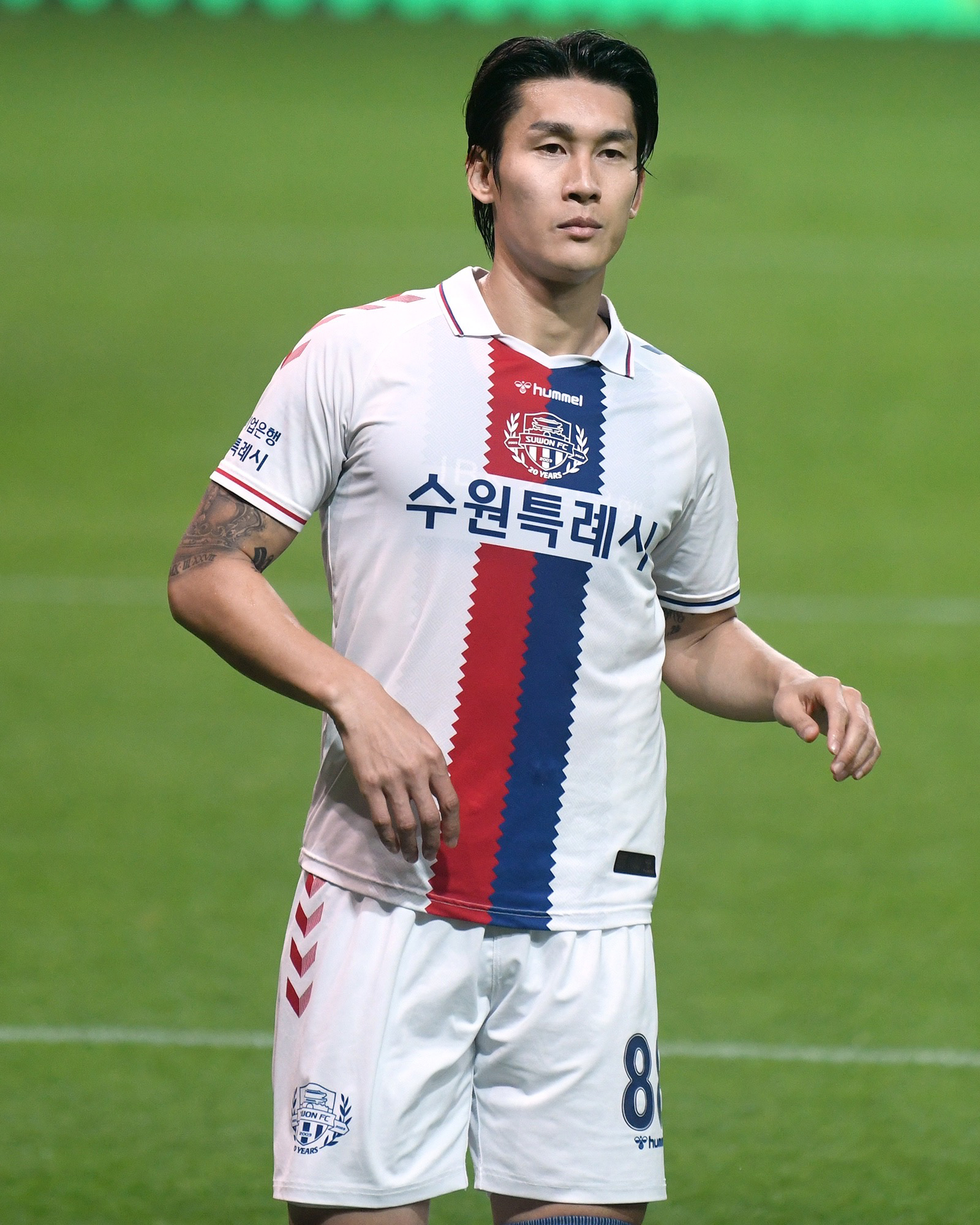
- Lee with Suwon FC, 2023

Personal information
- Full name: Lee Yong
- Date of birth: 24 December 1986 (age 39)
- Place of birth: Seoul, South Korea
- Height: 1.80 m (5 ft 11 in)
- Position: Full-back

Team information
- Current team: Ulsan HD
- Number: 88

Youth career
- 1999–2001: Gyeongshin Middle School
- 2002–2005: Yeongdeungpo Technical High School

College career
Years	Team	Apps	(Gls)
2006–2009	Chungang University		

Senior career*
Years	Team	Apps	(Gls)
2010–2016	Ulsan Hyundai	127	(1)
2015–2016	→ Sangju Sangmu (draft)	56	(2)
2017–2022	Jeonbuk Hyundai Motors	113	(0)
2022	→ Suwon FC (loan)	13	(0)
2023–2025	Suwon FC	74	(2)
2026–	Ulsan HD	0	(0)

International career^{‡}
2009	South Korea Universiade	3	(0)
2013–2022	South Korea	57	(0)
- * Club domestic league appearances and goals as of 9 November 2025 ‡ National team caps and goals as of 10 June 2022

- Lee Yong
- Hangul: 이용
- Hanja: 李鎔
- RR: I Yong
- MR: I Yong

Lee Yong (Korean: 이용; Hanja: 李鎔; Korean pronunciation: [i.joŋ]; born 24 December 1986) is a South Korean professional footballer who plays as a right-back for Ulsan HD.

== Early life ==
Lee grew up in Hanam, a city on the outskirts of Seoul. He completed his schooling in Seoul due to the lack of schools with established football programs in Hanam at that time. One of his elementary school classmates was his neighbor and future national teammate Park Joo-ho.

As he was a "late bloomer", Lee was not heavily scouted as a high school senior and spent a gap year training before trying out again the next season. He was eventually accepted into Chung-Ang University.

== Club career ==
Lee was drafted by Ulsan Hyundai FC in 2010.

In 2015 Lee enlisted for mandatory military service and assigned to the Korea Armed Forces Athletic Corps (Sangju Sangmu). His contract with Ulsan Hyundai was not extended and he was traded to Jeonbuk Hyundai Motors FC after he was discharged from the military.

== International career ==
In May 2018 he was named in South Korea's preliminary 28 man squad for the 2018 FIFA World Cup in Russia.

== Career statistics ==
=== Club ===
As of 8 December 2025

Club performance			League		Cup		League Cup		Continental		Other		Total	
Season	Club	League	Apps	Goals	Apps	Goals	Apps	Goals	Apps	Goals	Apps	Goals	Apps	Goals
2010	Ulsan Hyundai	K League 1	19	0	2	0	5	0	—		1 (Note: Appearances in K League Championship)	0	27	0
2011	Ulsan Hyundai	K League 1	17	0	4	0	6	0	—		5	0	32	0
2012	Ulsan Hyundai	K League 1	22	0	2	0	—		8 (Note: Appearances in AFC Champions League)	0	2 (Note: Appearances in FIFA Club World Cup)	1	34	1
2013	Ulsan Hyundai	K League 1	37	1	2	0	—		—		—		39	1
2014	Ulsan Hyundai	K League 1	31	0	1	0	—		5	0	—		37	0
2015	Sangju Sangmu (draft)	K League 2	33	0	0	0	—		—		—		33	0
2016	Sangju Sangmu (draft)	K League 1	23	2	0	0	—		—		—		23	2
2016	Ulsan Hyundai	K League 1	1	0	0	0	—		—		—		1	0
2017	Jeonbuk Hyundai Motors	K League 1	8	0	1	0	—		—		—		9	0
2018	Jeonbuk Hyundai Motors	K League 1	32	0	1	0	—		9	0	—		42	0
2019	Jeonbuk Hyundai Motors	K League 1	20	0	0	0	—		5	0	—		25	0
2020	Jeonbuk Hyundai Motors	K League 1	20	0	1	0	—		1	0	—		22	0
2021	Jeonbuk Hyundai Motors	K League 1	25	0	1	0	—		8	0	—		34	0
2022	Jeonbuk Hyundai Motors	K League 1	8	0	0	0	—		0	0	—		8	0
2022	Suwon FC (loan)	K League 1	13	0	0	0	—		—		—		13	0
2023	Suwon FC	K League 1	25	1	0	0	—		—		1 (Note: Appearances in K League promotion-relegation playoffs)	0	26	1
2024	Suwon FC	K League 1	30	1	0	0	—		—		—		30	1
2025	Suwon FC	K League 1	19	0	0	0	—		—		1	0	20	0
Total	South Korea		383	5	15	0	11	0	36	0	10	1	455	6
Career total			383	5	15	0	11	0	36	0	10	1	455	6

=== International ===
As of 10 June 2022

National team	Year	Apps	Goals
South Korea	2013	7	0
South Korea	2014	11	0
South Korea	2016	3	0
South Korea	2017	1	0
South Korea	2018	16	0
South Korea	2019	7	0
South Korea	2021	8	0
South Korea	2022	4	0
South Korea	Total	57	0

== Honours ==
Ulsan Hyundai

- League Cup: 2011
- AFC Champions League: 2012

Sangju Sangmu

- K League 2: 2015

Jeonbuk Hyundai Motors

- K League 1: 2017, 2018, 2019, 2020, 2021
- KFA Cup: 2020

=== Individual ===
- K League 1 Best XI: 2013, 2018, 2019
- K League 2 Best XI: 2015
