= Choi Young-eun =

South Korean footballer

Personal information
- Date of birth: 26 September 1995 (age 31)
- Place of birth: South Korea
- Height: 1.89 m (6 ft 2 1/2 in)
- Position: Goalkeeper

Team information
- Current team: Dangjin Citizen FC
- Number: 1

Youth career
- ~2018: Sungkyunkwan University

Senior career*
Years	Team	Apps	(Gls)
2018–2025	Daegu FC	89	(0)
2026-	Dangjin Citizen FC		(0)
- * Club domestic league appearances and goals as of 8 January 2026

- Choi Young-eun
- Hangul: 최영은
- Hanja: 崔英恩
- RR: Choe Yeongeun
- MR: Ch'oe Yŏngŭn

Choi Young-eun (Korean: 최영은; born 26 September 1995) is a South Korean football goalkeeper, who plays for Daegu FC in the K League 1.

== Club career ==
Born on 26 September 1995, Choi played his youth football for Sungkyunkwan University, and was the starting goalkeeper in its Korean FA Cup match against Seongnam FC in June 2016. He transferred to Daegu FC in January 2018, and made his debut for the club on 29 July 2018, playing against Jeonbuk Motors.

== Club career statistics ==
As of 8 January 2026

Appearances and goals by club, season and competition
Club	Season	League			Cup		Continental		Other		Total	
Club	Season	Division	Apps	Goals	Apps	Goals	Apps	Goals	Apps	Goals	Apps	Goals
Daegu FC	2018	K League 1	10	0	1	0	—		—		11	0
Daegu FC	2019	K League 1	1	0	1	0	0	0	—		2	0
Daegu FC	2020	K League 1	10	0	0	0	—		—		10	0
Daegu FC	2021	K League 1	36	0	4	0	7	0	—		47	0
Daegu FC	2022	K League 1	2	0	0	0	2	0	—		4	0
Daegu FC	2023	K League 1	18	0	1	0	—		—		19	0
Daegu FC	2024	K League 1	12	0	1	0	—		0	0	13	0
Daegu FC	2025	K League 1	0	0	0	0	—		0	0	0	0
Career total			89	0	8	0	9	0	0	0	106	0

== Honors and awards ==
=== Player ===
Daegu FC

- Korean FA Cup Winners (1) : 2018
