= Jair (footballer, born 1988) =

Brazilian footballer

Personal information
- Full name: Jair Eduardo Britto da Silva
- Date of birth: 10 June 1988 (age 38)
- Place of birth: Pelotas, Brazil
- Height: 1.79 m (5 ft 10 in)
- Position: Striker

Youth career
- Internacional

Senior career*
| Years | Team | Apps | (Gls) |
| 2007–2009 | ABC | 24 | (22) |
| 2009–2011 | Brasil de Pelotas | 7 | (2) |
| 2010 | → Ponte Preta (loan) | 1 | (0) |
| 2011–2012 | Jeju United | 55 | (20) |
| 2013–2014 | JEF United Chiba | 18 | (4) |
| 2013 | → Emirates Club (loan) | 15 | (7) |
| 2014 | → Kashima Antlers (loan) | 5 | (0) |
| 2015 | Caxias | 0 | (0) |
| 2016 | Hatta Club | 0 | (0) |
| 2016–2017 | Jeonnam Dragons | 55 | (26) |
| 2018 | Yanbian Funde | 13 | (0) |
| 2018–2019 | Newcastle Jets | 20 | (2) |
| 2019–2020 | Central Coast Mariners | 15 | (1) |
- * Club domestic league appearances and goals as of 1 September 2020

Jair Eduardo Britto da Silva (born 10 June 1988), simply known as Jair, is a Brazilian football player.

Jair played for Brasil de Pelotas between 2009 and 2011. In January 2009, he was a survivor of a bus crash that killed two of his team mates and a member of the Brasil de Pelotas coaching staff.

He awarded to 2008 Brasileiro Alagoas Championship Rookie of the Year, 2009 Brasileiro Quala Championship MVP, 2010 Brasileiro Serie B MVP. In 2011, he moved to South Korean team Jeju United.

In 2013, he moved to Japanese team JEF United Chiba. He came to substitute striker Yoshihito Fujita, who left the team for Yokohama F. Marinos in J1 League.

In July 2013, he moved to Emirates Club who play in UAE Arabian Gulf League on a loan deal.

Ahead of the 2018–19 A-League season, Jair signed with Newcastle Jets with the club announcing a one-year contract in September 2018.

On 18 November 2019 it was announced he had signed a one-year contract with A-League club Central Coast Mariners. Jair was released by the Mariners at the end of the 2019–20 A-League in September 2020.

== Career statistics ==
As of match played 3 August 2020.

Appearances and goals by club, season and competition
| Club | Season | League | | | National Cup | | League Cup | | Continental | | Other | | Total | |
| Club | Season | Division | Apps | Goals | Apps | Goals | Apps | Goals | Apps | Goals | Apps | Goals | Apps | Goals |
|---|---|---|---|---|---|---|---|---|---|---|---|---|---|---|
| Brasil de Pelotas | 2010 | Série C | 4 | 1 | — | | — | | — | | — | | 4 | 1 |
| Brasil de Pelotas | 2010 | Série C | 3 | 1 | — | | — | | — | | — | | 3 | 1 |
| Brasil de Pelotas | Total | | 7 | 2 | — | | — | | — | | — | | 7 | 2 |
| Ponte Preta (loan) | 2010 | Série B | 1 | 0 | — | | — | | — | | — | | 1 | 0 |
| Jeju United | 2011 | K-League | 11 | 2 | 2 | 0 | 0 | 0 | 2 | 0 | — | | 15 | 2 |
| Jeju United | 2012 | K-League | 44 | 18 | 4 | 2 | — | | — | | — | | 48 | 20 |
| Jeju United | Total | | 55 | 20 | 6 | 2 | 0 | 0 | 2 | 0 | — | | 63 | 22 |
| JEF United Chiba | 2013 | J2 League | 16 | 4 | — | | — | | — | | — | | 16 | 4 |
| JEF United Chiba | 2014 | J2 League | 2 | 0 | 2 | 0 | — | | — | | — | | 4 | 0 |
| JEF United Chiba | Total | | 18 | 4 | 2 | 0 | — | | — | | — | | 20 | 4 |
| Emirates Club (loan) | 2013–14 | UAE Pro League | 15 | 7 | — | | 3 | 1 | — | | — | | 18 | 8 |
| Kashima Antlers (loan) | 2014 | J1 League | 5 | 0 | — | | 1 | 0 | — | | — | | 6 | 0 |
| Caxias | 2015 | Série C | — | | 1 | 0 | — | | — | | — | | 1 | 0 |
| Jeonnam Dragons | 2016 | K League Classic | 20 | 10 | 1 | 0 | — | | — | | — | | 21 | 10 |
| Jeonnam Dragons | 2017 | K League Classic | 35 | 16 | 1 | 0 | — | | — | | — | | 36 | 16 |
| Jeonnam Dragons | Total | | 55 | 26 | 2 | 0 | — | | — | | — | | 57 | 26 |
| Yanbian Funde | 2018 | China League One | 13 | 0 | 0 | 0 | — | | — | | — | | 13 | 0 |
| Newcastle Jets | 2018–19 | A-League | 20 | 2 | 0 | 0 | — | | — | | — | | 20 | 2 |
| Central Coast Mariners | 2019–20 | A-League | 15 | 1 | 0 | 0 | — | | — | | — | | 15 | 1 |
| Career total | | | 204 | 62 | 11 | 2 | 4 | 1 | 2 | 0 | 0 | 0 | 221 | 65 |
