= Ivan Kovačec =

Croatian footballer (born 1988)

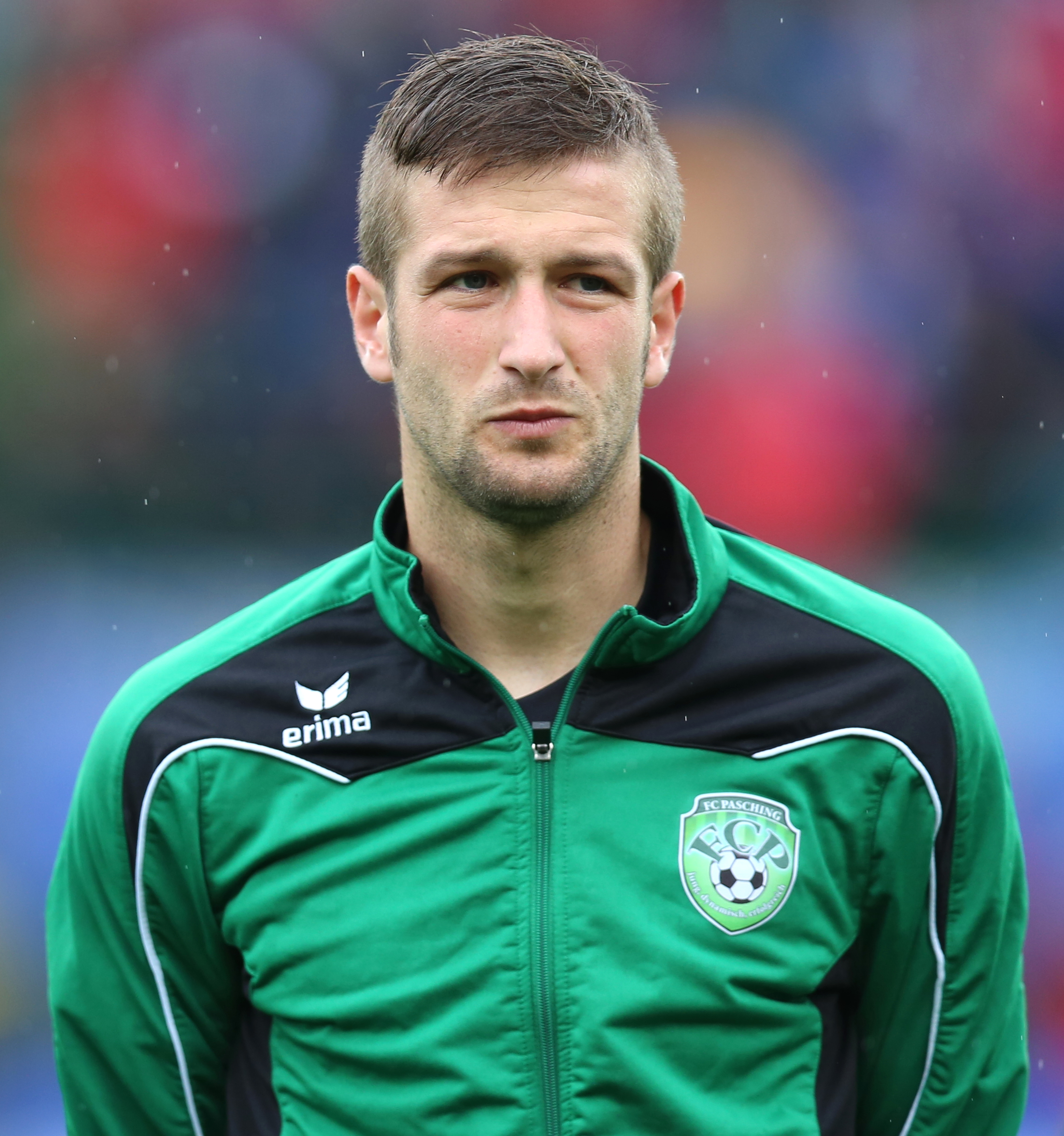

Personal information
- Date of birth: 27 June 1988 (age 38)
- Place of birth: Zagreb, SFR Yugoslavia
- Height: 1.88 m (6 ft 2 in)
- Position: Winger

Team information
- Current team: Drava Ptuj

Youth career
- –2005: Varteks

Senior career*
Years	Team	Apps	(Gls)
2005–2006	Nedeljanec		
2006–2007	ASV Deutsch Tschantschendorf		
2006–2007	→ SV St. Michael (loan)		
2007	Zagorec		
2008	UFC Jennersdorf	29	(23)
2009	Križevci		
2009–2010	Hrvatski Dragovoljac		(4)
2010–2012	Stegersbach	30	(25)
2012–2013	Pasching	24	(10)
2013–2014	Liefering	17	(6)
2014	→ LASK Linz (loan)	12	(4)
2014–2015	Rheindorf Altach	24	(4)
2015–2017	Ulsan Hyundai	60	(13)
2017–2018	FC Seoul	12	(0)
2018–2019	Rudeš	5	(0)
2019	Panachaiki	7	(0)
2019–2020	SV Ried	14	(2)
2020	NK Zagorec Krapina	0	(0)
2021	ASV Siegendorf	8	(3)
2022	Drava Ptuj	2	(0)
- * Club domestic league appearances and goals as of 26 September 2022

Ivan Kovačec (Croatian pronunciation: [ǐʋaŋ koʋǎtʃets]; (Note: In isolation, Ivan is pronounced [ǐʋan].) born 27 June 1988) is a Croatian footballer who plays for NK Rudar Mihovljan.

== Club career ==
=== K League ===
On 9 July 2015, Kovačec joined the K League 1 side Ulsan Hyundai. On 18 June 2017, Kovačec's contract was officially terminated by mutual consent.

On 13 July 2017, Kovačec joined the K League 1 side FC Seoul.

=== Return to Europe ===
He has had several spells in Austria, his most recent with ASV Siegendorf.

== Career statistics ==
As of matches played 21 May 2022

Appearances and goals by club, season and competition
Club	Season	League			Cup		League Cup		Continental		Total	
Club	Season	Division	Apps	Goals	Apps	Goals	Apps	Goals	Apps	Goals	Apps	Goals
Stegersbach	2011–12	Austrian Regionalliga	30	25	1	0	—		—		31	25
Pasching	2012–13	Austrian Regionalliga	24	10	5	2	—		—		29	12
Liefering	2013–14	Austrian First League	17	6	—		—		—		17	6
LASK Linz (loan)	2013–14	Austrian Regionalliga	12	4	—		—		2	0	14	4
Rheindorf Altach	2014–15	Austrian Bundesliga	24	4	4	2	—		—		28	6
Ulsan Hyundai	2015	K League 1	17	6	2	2	—		—		19	8
Ulsan Hyundai	2016	K League 1	36	7	2	1	—		—		38	8
Ulsan Hyundai	2017	K League 1	7	0	2	0	7	1	—		16	1
Ulsan Hyundai	Total		60	13	6	3	7	1	—		73	17
FC Seoul	2017	K League 1	7	0	—		—		—		7	0
FC Seoul	2018	K League 1	5	0	—		—		—		5	0
FC Seoul	Total		12	0	—		—		—		12	0
Rudeš	2018–19	1. HNL	5	0	—		—		—		5	0
Panachaiki	2018–19	Football League Greece	7	0	—		—		—		7	0
SV Ried	2019–20	Austrian Football Second League	14	2	2	0	—		—		16	2
NK Zagorec Krapina	2020–21	3. HNL	13	0	0	0	—		—		13	0
ASV Siegendorf	2021–22	Burgenlandliga	8	3	1	0	—		—		9	3
Drava Ptuj	2021–22	2. SNL	2	0	—		—		—		2	0
Career Total			228	67	19	7	7	1	2	0	256	75

== Honours ==
Pasching

- Austrian Cup: 2012–13
