= Richard Windbichler =

Austrian footballer (born 1991)

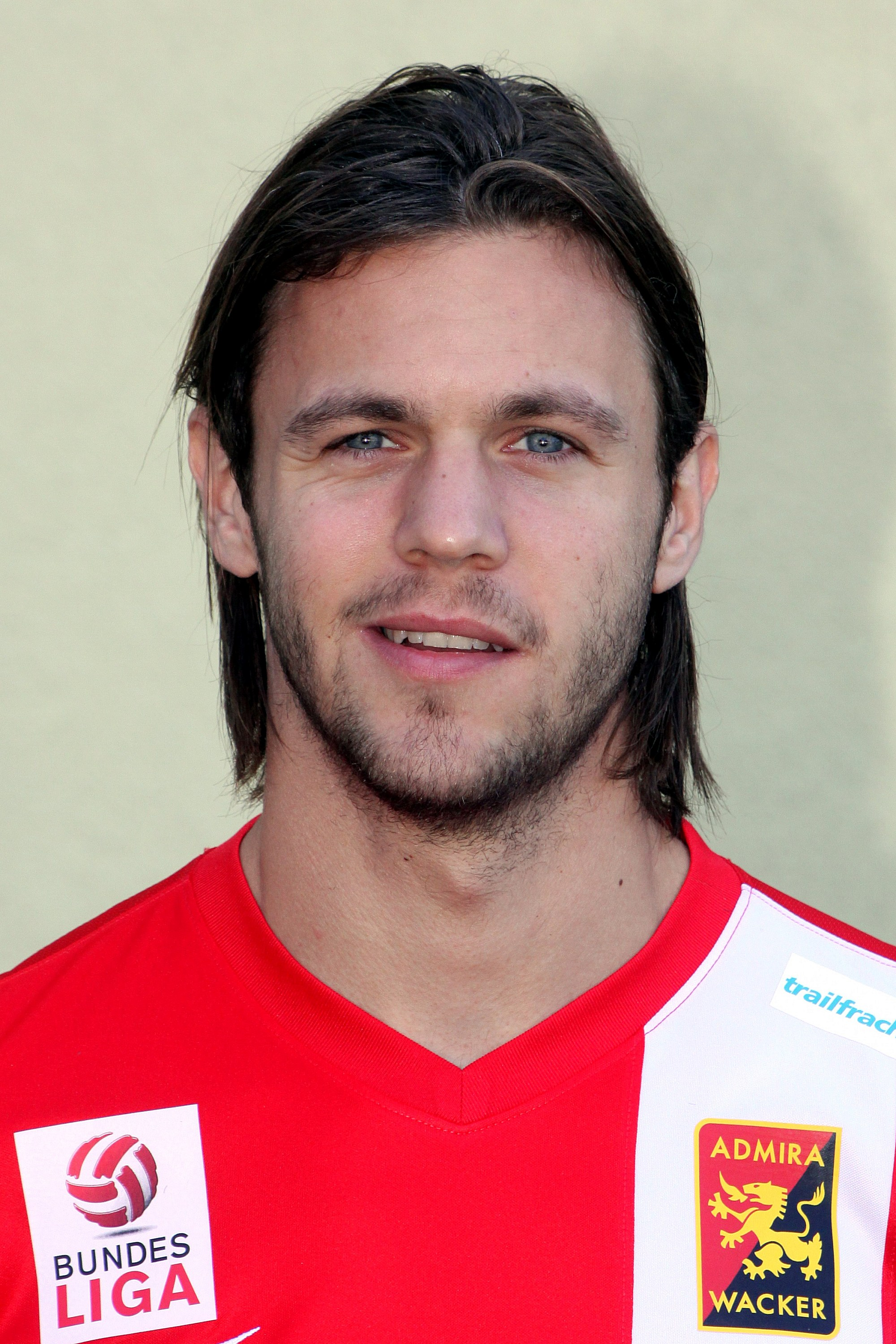
- Windbichler with Admira Wacker in July 2013

Personal information
- Full name: Richard Windbichler
- Date of birth: 2 April 1991 (age 35)
- Place of birth: Wien, Austria
- Height: 1.83 m (6 ft 0 in)
- Position: Defender

Senior career*
| Years | Team | Apps | (Gls) |
| 2009–2015 | Admira Wacker | 131 | (8) |
| 2015–2017 | FK Austria Wien | 36 | (0) |
| 2017–2018 | Ulsan Hyundai | 58 | (2) |
| 2019 | Viborg FF | 5 | (0) |
| 2019–2020 | Melbourne City | 8 | (0) |
| 2021 | Seongnam FC | 22 | (1) |
| 2022–2023 | Chengdu Rongcheng | 54 | (2) |
| 2024 | San Antonio FC | 7 | (0) |

International career
| 2008–2009 | Austria U-18 | 3 | (0) |
| 2009–2010 | Austria U-19 | 2 | (0) |
| 2011 | Austria U-20 | 1 | (0) |
| 2010–2012 | Austria U-21 | 12 | (0) |
- * Club domestic league appearances and goals as of 31 October 2024

Richard Windbichler (born 2 April 1991) is an Austrian former professional footballer who played as a defender.

== Club career ==
On 20 January 2017, Windbichler joined K League Classic side Ulsan Hyundai. He is the first player from Austria to feature in the K League 1. He left the club at the end of 2018, where his contract expired.

On 28 March 2019, Windbichler signed a short contract with Viborg FF in the Danish 1st Division until the summer 2019. On 28 May 2019, his contract was terminated by mutual consent.

In June 2019, Windbichler joined A-League club Melbourne City on a two-year contract.

On 14 January 2021, Windbichler signed with K League 1 side, Seongnam FC. He left the club at the end of the season.

Windbichler joined USL Championship club San Antonio FC on 25 January 2024.

== Career statistics ==
As of matches played 4 November 2023

Appearances and goals by club, season and competition
| Club | Season | League | | | Cup | | League Cup | | Continental | | Total | |
| Club | Season | Division | Apps | Goals | Apps | Goals | Apps | Goals | Apps | Goals | Apps | Goals |
|---|---|---|---|---|---|---|---|---|---|---|---|---|
| Admira Wacker | 2009–10 | Austrian Football First League | 13 | 0 | 2 | 0 | — | | — | | 15 | 0 |
| Admira Wacker | 2010–11 | Austrian Football First League | 16 | 2 | 0 | 0 | — | | — | | 16 | 2 |
| Admira Wacker | 2011–12 | Austrian Bundesliga | 21 | 0 | 0 | 0 | — | | — | | 21 | 0 |
| Admira Wacker | 2012–13 | Austrian Bundesliga | 22 | 1 | 2 | 0 | — | | 3 | 0 | 27 | 1 |
| Admira Wacker | 2013–14 | Austrian Bundesliga | 29 | 1 | 3 | 0 | — | | — | | 32 | 1 |
| Admira Wacker | 2014–15 | Austrian Bundesliga | 30 | 4 | 2 | 0 | — | | — | | 32 | 4 |
| Admira Wacker | Total | | 131 | 8 | 9 | 0 | 0 | 0 | 3 | 0 | 143 | 8 |
| Austria Wien | 2015–16 | Austrian Bundesliga | 25 | 0 | 3 | 0 | — | | — | | 28 | 0 |
| Austria Wien | 2016–17 | Austrian Bundesliga | 11 | 0 | 1 | 0 | — | | 1 | 0 | 13 | 0 |
| Austria Wien | Total | | 36 | 0 | 4 | 0 | 0 | 0 | 1 | 0 | 41 | 0 |
| Ulsan Hyundai | 2017 | K League 1 | 30 | 2 | 5 | 0 | — | | 3 | 0 | 38 | 2 |
| Ulsan Hyundai | 2018 | K League 1 | 28 | 0 | 5 | 1 | — | | 7 | 2 | 40 | 3 |
| Ulsan Hyundai | Total | | 58 | 2 | 10 | 1 | 0 | 0 | 7 | 2 | 78 | 5 |
| Viborg FF | 2018–19 | 1. Division | 5 | 0 | 0 | 0 | — | | — | | 5 | 0 |
| Melbourne City | 2019–20 | A-League | 8 | 0 | 2 | 0 | — | | — | | 10 | 0 |
| Seongnam FC | 2021 | K League 1 | 22 | 1 | 0 | 0 | — | | — | | 22 | 1 |
| Chengdu Rongcheng | 2022 | Chinese Super League | 28 | 1 | 0 | 0 | — | | — | | 28 | 1 |
| Chengdu Rongcheng | 2023 | Chinese Super League | 26 | 1 | 0 | 0 | — | | — | | 26 | 1 |
| Chengdu Rongcheng | Total | | 54 | 2 | 0 | 0 | 0 | 0 | 0 | 0 | 54 | 2 |
| Career Total | | | 348 | 16 | 24 | 1 | 0 | 0 | 14 | 2 | 386 | 19 |
