= 2017 K League Classic =

35th season of top-tier football league in South Korea

KEB Hana Bank K League Classic
- Season: 2017
- Dates: 4 March – 19 November 2017
- Champions: Jeonbuk Hyundai Motors (5th title)
- Relegated: Gwangju FC
- Champions League: Jeonbuk Hyundai Motors; Ulsan Hyundai; Jeju United; Suwon Samsung Bluewings
- Matches: 228
- Goals: 626 (2.75 per match)
- Best Player: Lee Jae-sung
- Top goalscorer: Johnathan (22 goals)
- Biggest home win: Jeonnam 5–0 Ulsan (22 April 2017); Jeonnam 5–0 Gwangju (7 May 2017); Pohang 5–0 Incheon (14 October 2017)
- Biggest away win: Jeonbuk 0–4 Jeju (3 May 2017); Incheon 1–5 Seoul (19 July 2017); Pohang 0–4 Jeonbuk (17 September 2017); Gwangju 0–4 Pohang (18 November 2017)
- Highest attendance: 34,376; Seoul 1–1 Suwon (4 March 2017)
- Lowest attendance: 736; Sangju 0–0 Jeonnam (28 October 2017)
- Average attendance: 6,505

The 2017 K League Classic was the 35th season of the top division of South Korean professional football since its establishment in 1983, and the fifth season of the K League Classic.

== Teams ==
=== General information ===
Club	City/Province	Manager	Owner(s)	Other sponsor(s)
Daegu FC	Daegu	(South Korea) Son Hyun-jun	Daegu Government	
Gangwon FC	Gangwon	(South Korea) Choi Yun-kyum	Gangwon Provincial Government	
Gwangju FC	Gwangju	(South Korea) Nam Ki-il	Gwangju Government	
Incheon United	Incheon	(South Korea) Lee Ki-hyung	Incheon Government	Shinhan Bank; Incheon International Airport
Jeju United	Jeju	(South Korea) Jo Sung-hwan	SK Energy	
Jeonbuk Hyundai Motors	Jeonbuk	(South Korea) Choi Kang-hee	Hyundai Motor Company	
Jeonnam Dragons	Jeonnam	(South Korea) Roh Sang-rae	POSCO	
Pohang Steelers	Pohang, Gyeongbuk	(South Korea) Choi Soon-ho	POSCO	
Sangju Sangmu	Sangju, Gyeongbuk	(South Korea) Kim Tae-wan	Korea Armed Forces Athletic Corps	
FC Seoul	Seoul	(South Korea) Hwang Sun-hong	GS Group	
Suwon Samsung Bluewings	Suwon, Gyeonggi	(South Korea) Seo Jung-won	Cheil Worldwide	Samsung Electronics; Maeil Dairies Industry
Ulsan Hyundai	Ulsan	(South Korea) Kim Do-hoon	Hyundai Heavy Industries	

=== Locations ===
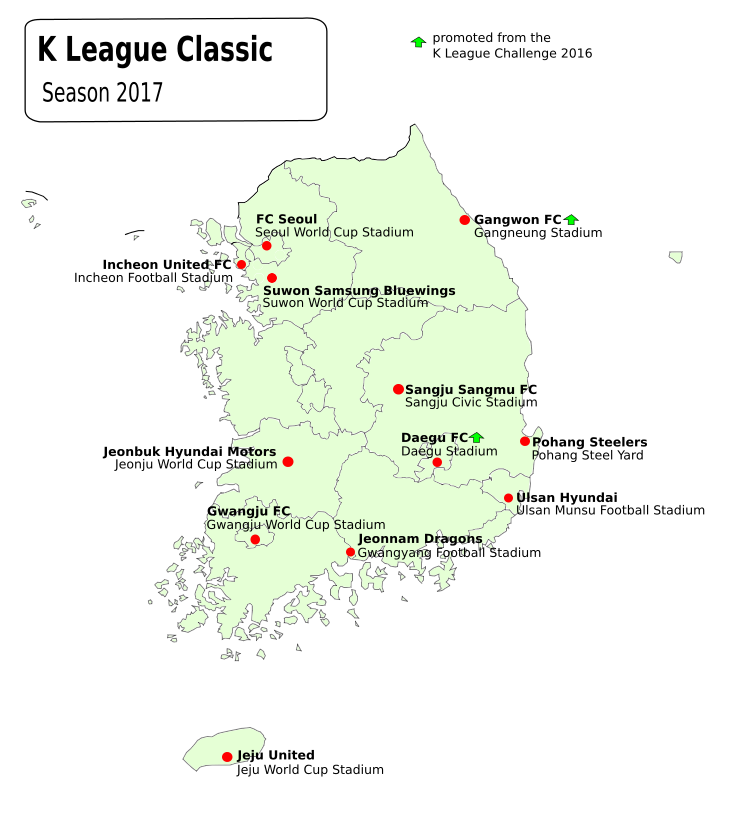
Locations of the 2017 K League Classic clubs

=== Stadiums ===
Daegu FC	Gangwon FC	Gwangju FC	Incheon United	Jeju United	Jeonbuk Hyundai Motors
Daegu Stadium	Alpensia Ski Jumping Stadium	Gwangju World Cup Stadium	Incheon Football Stadium	Jeju World Cup Stadium	Jeonju World Cup Stadium
Capacity: **66,422**	Capacity: **13,500**	Capacity: **40,245**	Capacity: **20,891**	Capacity: **35,657**	Capacity: **42,477**
Jeonnam Dragons	Pohang Steelers	Sangju Sangmu	FC Seoul	Suwon Samsung Bluewings	Ulsan Hyundai
Gwangyang Football Stadium	Pohang Steel Yard	Sangju Civic Stadium	Seoul World Cup Stadium	Suwon World Cup Stadium	Ulsan Munsu Football Stadium
Capacity: **13,496**	Capacity: **17,443**	Capacity: **15,042**	Capacity: **66,704**	Capacity: **44,031**	Capacity: **44,102**

=== Foreign players ===
Restricting the number of foreign players strictly to four per team, including a slot for a player from AFC countries. A team could use four foreign players on the field each game including a least one player from the AFC confederation. Players name in bold indicates the player is registered during the mid-season transfer window.

As of 13 July 2017

Club	Player 1	Player 2	Player 3	Asian player	Former players
Daegu FC	(Brazil) Cesinha	(Brazil) **Evandro Paulista**	(Brazil) Júnior Negrão		(Brazil) Léo Mineiro (Brazil) (Timor-Leste) Rodrigo (Note: Could be deemed as an Asian player by owning Timorese passport.)
Gangwon FC	(Brazil) Diego Maurício	(Brazil) **Gerson**	(Burundi) **Jonathan Nanizayamo**	(Vietnam) Lương Xuân Trường	(Brazil) Serginho (Cyprus) Valentinos Sielis
Gwangju FC	(Brazil) **Wanderson Macedo**	(Niger) Olivier Bonnes	(Northern Ireland) **Niall McGinn**		(Japan) Tomoki Wada (Portugal) Ricardo Barros
Incheon United	(Argentina) **Enzo Maidana**	(Brazil) Weslley	(Croatia) Gordan Bunoza	(Australia) Connor Chapman	(Serbia) Dalibor Veselinović
Jeju United	(Brazil) Magno Cruz	(Brazil) **Mailson**	(Guinea-Bissau) Frédéric Mendy	(Australia) Aleksandar Jovanović	(Brazil) Marcelo Toscano
Jeonbuk Hyundai Motors	(Brazil) Edu	(Brazil) Ricardo Lopes		(Palestine) Éder (Note: Could be deemed as an Asian player by owning Palestinian passport.)	(Brazil) Mazola
Jeonnam Dragons	(Brazil) Jair	(Croatia) Vedran Jugović	(Hungary) Róbert Feczesin	(Australia) Tomislav Mrčela	
Pohang Steelers	(Brazil) Lulinha	(Brazil) Muralha	(Brazil) **Wanderson Carvalho**		(Iraq) Ali Abbas (Sweden) Marcus Nilsson
FC Seoul	(Croatia) **Ivan Kovačec**	(Montenegro) Dejan Damjanović	(Spain) Osmar	(Iran) **Khaled Shafiei**	(Brazil) Maurinho
Suwon Samsung Bluewings	(Brazil) Johnathan	(Brazil) Júnior Santos	(Croatia) Damir Šovšić	(Australia) Matt Jurman	
Ulsan Hyundai	(Austria) Richard Windbichler	(Croatia) Mislav Oršić	(Switzerland) **Danijel Subotić**	(Japan) **Takuma Abe**	(Australia) Dimitri Petratos (Croatia) Ivan Kovačec

== League table ==
Pos	Team	Pld	W	D	L	GF	GA	GD	Pts	Qualification or relegation
1	Jeonbuk Hyundai Motors (C)	38	22	9	7	73	35	+38	75	Qualification for Champions League group stage
2	Jeju United	38	19	9	10	60	37	+23	66	Qualification for Champions League group stage
3	Suwon Samsung Bluewings	38	17	13	8	63	41	+22	64	Qualification for Champions League play-off round
4	Ulsan Hyundai	38	17	11	10	42	45	−3	62	Qualification for Champions League group stage (Note: Qualified as champions of FA Cup.)
5	FC Seoul	38	16	13	9	56	42	+14	61	
6	Gangwon FC	38	13	10	15	59	65	−6	49	
7	Pohang Steelers	38	15	7	16	63	60	+3	52	
8	Daegu FC	38	11	14	13	50	52	−2	47	
9	Incheon United	38	7	18	13	32	53	−21	39	
10	Jeonnam Dragons	38	8	11	19	53	69	−16	35	
11	Sangju Sangmu (O)	38	8	11	19	41	66	−25	35	Qualification for relegation play-offs
12	Gwangju FC (R)	38	6	12	20	33	60	−27	30	Relegation to K League 2

Source: K League
Rules for classification: 1) Points; 2) Goals scored; 3) Goal difference; 4) Wins; 5) Head-to-head points
(C) Champions; (O) Play-off winners; (R) Relegated

== Positions by matchday ==
Leaders
Qualification for Champions League
Qualification for relegation play-offs
Relegation to K League 2

=== Round 1–33 ===
Team ╲ Round	1	2	3	4	5	6	7	8	9	10	11	12	13	14	15	16	17	18	19	20	21	22	23	24	25	26	27	28	29	30	31	32	33
Jeonbuk Hyundai Motors	1	2	2	2	2	1	1	1	2	2	1	3	1	1	1	1	1	1	1	1	1	1	1	1	1	1	1	1	1	1	1	1	1
Jeju United	4	1	1	1	1	3	2	2	1	1	2	1	2	4	5	3	3	4	6	5	5	4	4	4	4	4	2	2	2	2	2	2	2
Ulsan Hyundai	1	7	8	6	6	7	8	7	6	3	4	4	4	2	2	2	2	2	3	2	2	2	3	3	3	3	3	3	3	3	3	3	3
Suwon Samsung Bluewings	6	11	11	10	10	10	7	6	4	6	5	5	6	7	6	6	4	6	4	4	3	3	2	2	2	2	4	4	4	4	4	4	4
FC Seoul	6	3	3	5	5	4	4	5	3	5	6	7	7	6	7	7	7	7	7	7	6	6	6	5	5	5	5	5	5	5	5	5	5
Gangwon FC	1	6	6	7	8	5	6	11	10	9	7	6	5	3	4	4	5	3	2	3	4	5	5	6	6	6	6	6	6	6	6	6	6
Pohang Steelers	8	5	5	3	3	2	3	4	7	4	3	2	3	5	3	5	6	5	5	6	7	7	7	7	7	7	7	7	7	7	7	7	7
Daegu FC	11	9	9	11	7	8	10	9	11	11	11	11	10	10	10	10	10	11	11	11	11	10	10	10	10	9	9	9	9	9	9	9	8
Jeonnam Dragons	8	12	12	12	12	11	9	8	9	8	9	9	8	9	9	9	9	8	8	9	8	8	8	8	8	8	8	8	8	8	8	8	9
Sangju Sangmu	8	4	4	4	4	6	5	3	5	7	8	8	9	8	8	8	8	9	9	8	9	9	9	9	9	10	11	11	11	10	10	10	10
Incheon United	11	9	10	9	11	12	12	12	12	12	12	12	12	12	12	11	11	10	10	10	10	11	11	12	11	11	10	10	10	11	11	11	11
Gwangju FC	4	8	7	8	9	9	11	10	8	10	10	10	11	11	11	12	12	12	12	12	12	12	12	11	12	12	12	12	12	12	12	12	12

Source: K League

=== Round 34–38 ===
Team ╲ Round	34	35	36	37	38
Jeonbuk Hyundai Motors	1	1	1	1	1
Jeju United	2	2	2	2	2
Suwon Samsung Bluewings	4	4	3	3	3
Ulsan Hyundai	3	3	4	4	4
FC Seoul	5	5	5	5	5
Gangwon FC	6	6	6	6	6
Pohang Steelers	7	7	7	7	7
Daegu FC	8	8	8	8	8
Incheon United	11	10	10	9	9
Jeonnam Dragons	9	11	11	10	10
Sangju Sangmu	10	9	9	11	11
Gwangju FC	12	12	12	12	12

Source: K League

== Results ==
=== Matches 1–22 ===
Teams play each other twice, once at home, once away.

Home \ Away	DGU	GWN	GWJ	ICU	JJU	JHM	JND	PHS	SJS	SEO	SSB	USH
Daegu FC	—	1–2	2–2	2–2	1–2	0–2	2–1	3–0	2–0	2–1	0–3	1–3
Gangwon FC	2–1	—	2–2	2–1	2–1	1–1	2–2	2–2	2–0	0–1	1–2	0–1
Gwangju FC	1–0	1–1	—	0–0	0–1	1–0	1–2	1–2	1–2	3–2	0–3	1–1
Incheon United	0–0	1–1	1–0	—	0–1	0–0	1–3	0–3	1–1	1–5	3–3	1–2
Jeju United	4–2	1–2	1–1	1–1	—	2–1	2–0	3–0	4–1	1–2	1–2	3–0
Jeonbuk Hyundai Motors	2–2	4–1	3–1	1–1	0–4	—	2–1	2–0	4–1	1–0	2–0	4–0
Jeonnam Dragons	4–3	2–1	5–0	3–2	2–2	0–3	—	1–3	1–3	2–2	1–3	5–0
Pohang Steelers	2–1	1–2	2–0	2–0	2–1	1–3	1–1	—	1–2	3–2	2–3	1–2
Sangju Sangmu	1–1	1–2	1–0	0–1	0–3	1–3	1–1	0–1	—	2–2	1–3	0–0
FC Seoul	0–0	2–3	2–1	3–0	0–0	2–1	1–0	1–0	1–2	—	1–1	0–0
Suwon Samsung Bluewings	1–1	3–3	0–0	3–0	1–0	0–2	4–1	1–0	0–0	1–2	—	1–2
Ulsan Hyundai	1–0	2–1	1–0	1–2	1–0	0–0	1–0	2–1	0–1	1–1	2–1	—

Source: K League
Legend: Blue = home team win; Yellow = draw; Red = away team win.

=== Matches 23–33 ===
Teams play every other team once (either at home or away).

Home \ Away	DGU	GWN	GWJ	ICU	JJU	JHM	JND	PHS	SJS	SEO	SSB	USH
Daegu FC	—	—	—	1–1	—	—	—	2–1	2–2	2–2	0–0	—
Gangwon FC	0–1	—	—	2–0	0–2	—	3–3	—	—	—	—	1–1
Gwangju FC	0–1	1–1	—	—	—	—	2–1	—	—	1–4	0–1	1–1
Incheon United	—	—	0–0	—	0–0	1–3	—	2–0	—	1–0	1–1	—
Jeju United	2–0	—	1–1	—	—	0–1	3–1	3–2	—	—	—	2–1
Jeonbuk Hyundai Motors	1–1	4–3	3–1	—	—	—	—	—	1–2	—	—	0–1
Jeonnam Dragons	1–4	—	—	0–0	—	1–1	—	—	2–0	0–1	—	—
Pohang Steelers	—	5–2	3–2	—	—	0–4	1–1	—	2–2	—	1–1	—
Sangju Sangmu	—	1–2	3–2	1–2	2–2	—	—	—	—	0–1	—	—
FC Seoul	—	3–1	—	—	0–0	1–2	—	1–1	—	—	—	1–1
Suwon Samsung Bluewings	—	2–3	—	—	2–3	1–1	3–0	—	3–0	0–1	—	—
Ulsan Hyundai	3–2	—	—	1–1	—	—	1–0	1–1	4–2	—	1–1	—

Source: K League
Legend: Blue = home team win; Yellow = draw; Red = away team win.

=== Matches 34–38 ===
After 33 matches, the league splits into two sections of six teams each, with teams playing every other team in their section once (either at home or away). The exact matches are determined upon the league table at the time of the split.

==== Group A ====
Home \ Away	GWN	JJU	JHM	SEO	SSB	USH
Gangwon FC	—	—	0–4	4–0	—	1–2
Jeju United	1–0	—	—	—	0–0	—
Jeonbuk Hyundai Motors	—	3–0	—	0–0	2–3	—
FC Seoul	—	3–2	—	—	2–2	3–0
Suwon Samsung Bluewings	2–1	—	—	—	—	2–0
Ulsan Hyundai	—	0–1	1–2	—	—	—

Source: K League
Legend: Blue = home team win; Yellow = draw; Red = away team win.

==== Group B ====
Home \ Away	DGU	GWJ	ICU	JND	PHS	SJS
Daegu FC	—	2–0	0–0	1–0	—	—
Gwangju FC	—	—	—	—	0–4	1–0
Incheon United	—	0–0	—	—	—	2–0
Jeonnam Dragons	—	2–4	2–2	—	1–3	—
Pohang Steelers	1–2	—	5–0	—	—	—
Sangju Sangmu	2–2	—	—	0–0	3–4	—

Source: K League
Legend: Blue = home team win; Yellow = draw; Red = away team win.

== Relegation play-offs ==
The promotion-relegation play-offs were held between the winners of the 2017 K League Challenge play-offs and the 11th-placed club of the 2017 K League Classic. The winner on aggregate score after both matches earned entry into the 2018 K League 1.

22 November 2017
19:00 KST

Busan IPark	0–1	Sangju Sangmu
	Report	Yeo Reum 7'

Busan Gudeok Stadium, Busan
Attendance: 1,322
Referee: Lee Dong-jun

26 November 2017
15:00 KST

Sangju Sangmu	0–1 (a.e.t.)	Busan IPark
	Report	Rômulo 16' (pen.)
Penalties
Yeo Reum (penalty scored); Sin Jin-ho (penalty scored); Lim Chae-min (penalty scored); Kim Ho-nam (penalty scored); Joo Min-kyu (penalty scored)	5–4	(penalty scored) Rômulo; (penalty scored) Léo Mineiro; (penalty scored) Lee Dong-jun; (penalty missed) Ko Kyung-min; (penalty scored) Lim You-hwan

Sangju Civic Stadium, Sangju
Attendance: 2,714
Referee: Kim Seong-ho

1–1 on aggregate. Sangju Sangmu won 5–4 on penalties and therefore both clubs remain in their respective leagues.

== Player statistics ==
=== Top scorers ===
Rank	Player	Club	Goals
1	(Brazil) Johnathan	Suwon Samsung Bluewings	22
2	(South Korea) Yang Dong-hyen	Pohang Steelers	19
2	(Montenegro) Dejan Damjanović	FC Seoul	19
4	(South Korea) Joo Min-kyu	Sangju Sangmu	17
4	(Brazil) Lulinha	Pohang Steelers	17
6	(Brazil) Jair	Jeonnam Dragons	16
7	(Brazil) Edu	Jeonbuk Hyundai Motors	13
7	(Brazil) Magno Cruz	Jeju United	13
7	(Brazil) Diego Maurício	Gangwon FC	13
10	(Brazil) Júnior Negrão	Daegu FC	12

=== Top assist providers ===
Rank	Player	Club	Assists
1	(South Korea) Son Jun-ho	Pohang Steelers	14
2	(South Korea) Yun Il-lok	FC Seoul	12
3	(South Korea) Yeom Ki-hun	Suwon Samsung Bluewings	11
4	(South Korea) Lee Jae-sung	Jeonbuk Hyundai Motors	10
5	(South Korea) Lee Keun-ho	Gangwon FC	9
6	(South Korea) Kim Young-wook	Jeonnam Dragons	8
6	(South Korea) Kim Sun-min	Daegu FC	8
8	(Brazil) Cesinha	Daegu FC	7
8	(South Korea) Kwon Soon-hyung	Jeju United	7
8	(South Korea) Kim Tae-hwan	Sangju Sangmu	7

== Awards ==
=== Main awards ===
The 2017 K League Awards was held on 20 November 2017.

Award	Winner	Club
Most Valuable Player	(South Korea) Lee Jae-sung	Jeonbuk Hyundai Motors
Top goalscorer	(Brazil) Johnathan	Suwon Samsung Bluewings
Top assist provider	(South Korea) Son Jun-ho	Pohang Steelers
Young Player of the Year	(South Korea) Kim Min-jae	Jeonbuk Hyundai Motors
FANtastic Player	(Brazil) Johnathan	Suwon Samsung Bluewings
Manager of the Year	(South Korea) Choi Kang-hee	Jeonbuk Hyundai Motors

=== Best XI ===
Position	Winner	Club
Goalkeeper	(South Korea) Jo Hyeon-woo	Daegu FC
Defenders	(South Korea) Kim Jin-su	Jeonbuk Hyundai Motors
Defenders	(South Korea) Kim Min-jae	Jeonbuk Hyundai Motors
Defenders	(South Korea) Oh Ban-suk	Jeju United
Defenders	(South Korea) Choi Chul-soon	Jeonbuk Hyundai Motors
Midfielders	(South Korea) Yeom Ki-hun	Suwon Samsung Bluewings
Midfielders	(South Korea) Lee Jae-sung	Jeonbuk Hyundai Motors
Midfielders	(South Korea) Lee Chang-min	Jeju United
Midfielders	(South Korea) Lee Seung-gi	Jeonbuk Hyundai Motors
Forwards	(Brazil) Johnathan	Suwon Samsung Bluewings
Forwards	(South Korea) Lee Keun-ho	Gangwon FC

=== Player of the Round ===
Round	Winner	Club
1	(South Korea) Lee Keun-ho	Gangwon FC
2	(South Korea) Yang Dong-hyen	Pohang Steelers
3	(South Korea) Lee Chan-dong	Jeju United
4	(South Korea) Moon Seon-min	Incheon United
5	(Brazil) Lulinha	Pohang Steelers
6	(Brazil) Éder	Jeonbuk Hyundai Motors
7	(Guinea-Bissau) Frédéric Mendy	Jeju United
8	(South Korea) Joo Min-kyu	Sangju Sangmu
9	(Brazil) Marcelo Toscano	Jeju United
10	(Brazil) Jair	Jeonnam Dragons
11	(South Korea) Kim Seong-jun	Sangju Sangmu
12	(South Korea) Lee Keun-ho	Gangwon FC
13	(Brazil) Jair	Jeonnam Dragons
14	(South Korea) Yun Il-lok	FC Seoul
15	(South Korea) Kim Jin-su	Jeonbuk Hyundai Motors
16	(South Korea) Choi Jong-hoan	Incheon United
17	(South Korea) Lee Dong-gook	Jeonbuk Hyundai Motors
18	(South Korea) Yang Dong-hyen	Pohang Steelers
19	(South Korea) Kim Min-woo	Suwon Samsung Bluewings

Round	Winner	Club
20	(Brazil) Johnathan	Suwon Samsung Bluewings
21	(Hungary) Róbert Feczesin	Jeonnam Dragons
22	(Brazil) Johnathan	Suwon Samsung Bluewings
23	(Brazil) Johnathan	Suwon Samsung Bluewings
24	(South Korea) Kim Won-il	Jeju United
25	(South Korea) Lee Jong-ho	Ulsan Hyundai
26	(South Korea) Yang Han-been	FC Seoul
27	(South Korea) Lee Chang-min	Jeju United
28	(South Korea) Lee Seung-gi	Jeonbuk Hyundai Motors
29	(South Korea) Lee Dong-gook	Jeonbuk Hyundai Motors
30	(South Korea) Yoon Bit-garam	Jeju United
31	(South Korea) Joo Min-kyu	Sangju Sangmu
32	(South Korea) Joo Min-kyu	Sangju Sangmu
33	(Brazil) Júnior Negrão	Daegu FC
34	(Brazil) Wanderson Macedo	Gwangju FC
35	(Brazil) Ricardo Lopes	Jeonbuk Hyundai Motors
36	(South Korea) Lee Jae-sung	Jeonbuk Hyundai Motors
37	(South Korea) Lee Keun-ho	Gangwon FC
38	(Brazil) Júnior Santos	Suwon Samsung Bluewings

=== Manager of the Month ===
Month	Manager	Club	Division
March	(South Korea) Jo Sung-hwan	Jeju United	K League Classic
April	(South Korea) Kim Jong-boo	Gyeongnam FC	K League Challenge
May	(South Korea) Choi Yun-kyum	Gangwon FC	K League Classic
June	(South Korea) Choi Kang-hee	Jeonbuk Hyundai Motors	K League Classic
July	(South Korea) Seo Jung-won	Suwon Samsung Bluewings	K League Classic
August	(South Korea) Hwang Sun-hong	FC Seoul	K League Classic
September	(South Korea) Kim Do-hoon	Ulsan Hyundai	K League Classic
October	(Brazil) André	Daegu FC	K League Classic

== Attendance ==
=== Attendance by club ===
Attendants who entered with free ticket are not counted.

Pos	Team	Total	High	Low	Average	Change
1	FC Seoul	310,011	34,376	6,384	16,316	−9.4%
2	Jeonbuk Hyundai Motors	222,029	20,935	6,190	11,686	−30.4%
3	Suwon Samsung Bluewings	166,934	26,581	4,147	8,786	−17.4%
4	Ulsan Hyundai	160,825	13,225	4,531	8,464	−3.2%
5	Pohang Steelers	159,060	18,587	2,437	8,372	+9.0%
6	Incheon United	112,708	13,301	2,930	5,932	−2.0%
7	Jeonnam Dragons	78,093	10,579	1,565	4,110	−0.1%
8	Jeju United	77,096	8,526	2,184	4,058	−28.7%
9	Daegu FC	63,460	13,478	1,047	3,340	+23.2%^{†}
10	Gwangju FC	57,858	11,830	1,020	3,045	−12.4%
11	Gangwon FC	43,822	7,438	1,216	2,306	+116.3%^{†}
12	Sangju Sangmu	31,254	5,523	736	1,645	−15.3%
	League total	1,483,150	34,376	736	6,505	−17.4%

Source: K League
Notes:
^{†} Teams that played previous season in K League Challenge.

=== Top matches ===
Rank	Date	Round	Home	Score	Away	Venue	Attendance
1	5 March 2017	1	FC Seoul	1–1	Suwon Samsung Bluewings	Seoul World Cup Stadium	34,376
2	21 October 2017	35	FC Seoul	2–2	Suwon Samsung Bluewings	Seoul World Cup Stadium	27,257
3	12 August 2017	26	Suwon Samsung Bluewings	0–1	FC Seoul	Suwon World Cup Stadium	26,581
4	3 May 2017	9	FC Seoul	1–0	Jeonnam Dragons	Seoul World Cup Stadium	26,261
5	23 July 2017	23	FC Seoul	1–2	Jeonbuk Hyundai Motors	Seoul World Cup Stadium	23,913
6	5 March 2017	1	Jeonbuk Hyundai Motors	2–1	Jeonnam Dragons	Jeonju Stadium	20,935
7	18 June 2017	14	Suwon Samsung Bluewings	1–2	FC Seoul	Suwon World Cup Stadium	20,140
8	2 April 2017	4	Jeonbuk Hyundai Motors	1–0	FC Seoul	Jeonju Stadium	19,141
9	12 March 2017	2	Pohang Steelers	2–0	Gwangju FC	Pohang Steel Yard	18,587
10	19 August 2017	27	FC Seoul	1–1	Ulsan Hyundai	Seoul World Cup Stadium	18,087

== See also ==
- 2017 in South Korean football
- 2017 K League Challenge
- 2017 Korean FA Cup
