= Tiago Alves (footballer, born 1993) =

Brazilian footballer

Personal information
- Full name: Tiago Alves Sales
- Date of birth: 12 January 1993 (age 33)
- Place of birth: São João do Araguaia, Brazil
- Height: 1.80 m (5 ft 11 in)
- Position: Winger

Team information
- Current team: Jeju SK
- Number: 7

Youth career
- 2009–2011: Santos

Senior career*
Years	Team	Apps	(Gls)
2011–2014	Santos	17	(1)
2012	→ Boa Esporte (loan)	9	(1)
2013	→ América Mineiro (loan)	13	(2)
2014	→ Penapolense (loan)	5	(0)
2014	→ Paraná (loan)	26	(6)
2015–2016	Penapolense	0	(0)
2015	→ Pohang Steelers (loan)	25	(4)
2016	→ Seongnam FC (loan)	19	(13)
2016–2018	Al-Hilal FC	10	(1)
2017	→ Shimizu S-Pulse (loan)	17	(4)
2018–2019	Jeonbuk Hyundai Motors	20	(2)
2019	→ Sagan Tosu (loan)	4	(0)
2020	Sagan Tosu	13	(3)
2021	Gamba Osaka	17	(2)
2022–2023	Fagiano Okayama	61	(22)
2024	Tokushima Vortis	19	(1)
2025	Uthai Thani	15	(2)
2025–	Jeju SK	4	(0)
- * Club domestic league appearances and goals as of 21 September 2025, 12:00 (UTC)

Tiago Alves Sales, known as Tiago Alves (Brazilian Portuguese: [tʃiˈaɡu ˈawvis]; born 12 January 1993), is a Brazilian professional footballer who plays as a winger for K League 1 club, Jeju SK.

== Career ==
Born in São João do Araguaia, Pará, Tiago Alves graduated from Santos' youth setup. He made his professional debut on 2 February 2011, coming on as a second half substitute for Keirrison in a 2–2 away draw against Ponte Preta for the Campeonato Paulista championship. He scored his first professional goal on 27 March 2011, in the 3–2 away victory against Ituano.

On 16 May 2012, Tiago Alves was loaned to Série B club Boa Esporte, but returned to his parent club only three months later. On 3 December 2012, he was loaned to América Mineiro until the end of 2013 season.

Tiago Alves was subsequently loaned to Penapolense and Paraná, only appearing regularly with the latter. On 4 January 2015, he moved abroad for the first time in his career, signing for K League 1 side Pohang Steelers.

Tiago Alves made his debut for the club on 15 March, coming on as a second-half substitute and scoring his side's second in a 4–2 home loss against Ulsan Hyundai FC.

At the beginning of 2016, Tiago was loaned to Seongnam FC. He scored 13 goals and offered 5 assists to keep Seongnam in the K League 1.

On 1 August 2016, Thiago Alves transferred to Saudi Arabia's Al Hilal, signing a three-year contract for an undisclosed fee.

In March 2017 Shimizu S-Pulse announced the signing of Tiago Alves on a season-long loan from Al Hilal.

On 22 July 2025, Tiago Alves signed to K League 1 club, Jeju SK for mid 2025 season.

== Career statistics ==
As of 21 September 2025.

Appearances and goals by club, season and competition
Club	Season	League			State League		National cup		League cup		Continental		Other		Total	
Club	Season	Division	Apps	Goals	Apps	Goals	Apps	Goals	Apps	Goals	Apps	Goals	Apps	Goals	Apps	Goals
Santos	2011	Série A	9	0	3	1	0	0	—		0	0	—		12	1
Santos	2012	Série A	0	0	5	0	0	0	—		0	0	—		5	0
Santos	Total		9	0	8	1	0	0	0	0	0	0	0	0	17	1
Boa Esporte (loan)	2012	Série B	9	1	—		—		—		—		—		9	1
América-MG (loan)	2013	Série B	11	2	2	0	4	0	—		—		—		17	2
Penapolense (loan)	2014	Série D	0	0	5	0	—		—		—		—		5	0
Paraná (loan)	2014	Série B	26	6	—		—		—		—		—		26	6
Pohang Steelers	2015	K League Classic	25	4	—		1	0	—		—		—		26	4
Seongnam FC	2016	K League Classic	19	13	—		1	0	—		—		—		20	13
Al-Hilal	2016–17	Saudi Professional League	10	1	—		3	0	—		—		—		13	1
Shimizu S-Pulse	2017	J1 League	17	4	—		3	1	1 (Note: Appearance(s) in J.League Cup)	0	—		—		21	5
Jeonbuk Hyundai Motors	2018	K League 1	18	2	—		1	0	—		4 (Note: Appearance(s) in AFC Champions League)	1	—		23	3
Jeonbuk Hyundai Motors	2019	K League 1	2	0	—		1	0	—		2	0	—		5	0
Jeonbuk Hyundai Motors	Total		20	2	0	0	2	0	0	0	6	1	0	0	28	3
Sagan Tosu (loan)	2019	J1 League	4	0	—		1	0	0	0	—		—		5	0
Sagan Tosu	2020	J1 League	13	3	—		—		1	0	—		—		14	3
Gamba Osaka	2021	J1 League	17	2	—		3	0	0	0	0	0	1 (Note: Appearance(s) in Japanese Super Cup)	0	21	2
Fagiano Okayama	2022	J2 League	34	16	—		1	0	—		—		1 (Note: Appearance(s) in J1 League Promotion Playoffs)	0	36	16
Fagiano Okayama	2023	J2 League	27	6	—		1	0	—		—		—		28	6
Fagiano Okayama	Total		61	22	0	0	2	0	0	0	0	0	1	0	64	22
Chapecoense	2024	Série B	—		9	0	—		—		—		—		9	0
Tokushima Vortis	2024	J2 League	19	1	—		0	0	—		—		—		19	1
Uthai Thani	2024–25	Thai League 1	15	2	—		2	2	—		—		—		17	4
Jeju SK	2025	K League 1	4	0	—		0	0	—		—		—		4	0
Career total			281	63	24	1	22	3	2	0	6	1	2	0	335	68
