= Ricardo Lopes (footballer, born 1990) =

Brazilian footballer (born 1990)

- Lopes Pereira in 2018

Personal information
- Full name: Ricardo Lopes Pereira
- Date of birth: 28 October 1990 (age 36)
- Place of birth: Nova Rosalândia, Brazil
- Height: 1.83 m (6 ft 0 in)
- Position: Left winger

Team information
- Current team: Lamphun Warriors
- Number: 10

Senior career*
Years	Team	Apps	(Gls)
2012	Ituano		
2013	Gurupi	9	(1)
2014–2016	Globo	10	(23)
2014	→ Fortaleza (loan)	2	(0)
2015	→ Jeju United (loan)	33	(11)
2016–2019	Jeonbuk Hyundai Motors	124	(41)
2020–2021	Shanghai SIPG	31	(9)
2022–2023	JEF United Chiba	10	(0)
2023	Vorskla Poltava	7	(0)
2023	Suwon FC	14	(3)
2024	Busan IPark	14	(0)
2024	Lamphun Warriors	8	(2)
- * Club domestic league appearances and goals

Ricardo Lopes Pereira or simply Ricardo Lopes (born 28 October 1990) is a Brazilian professional footballer who plays as a left winger for Lamphun Warriors .

== Career ==
Ricardo Lopes Pereira started his career with regional lower league side Ituano where he made his debut on 8 February 2012 in a Campeonato Paulista league game against Bragantino that ended in a 4–1 defeat. The following season he joined a national league club in Gurupi, who were playing in the Campeonato Brasileiro Série D before having spells at Globo and Campeonato Brasileiro Série C club Fortaleza in the 2014 league season. His time at Globo and in particular his 2014 campaign with them where he achieved a personal best of 23 goals in one season attracted the interests of top tier South Korean football club Jeju United who he joined on loan on 6 January 2015. After establishing himself as Jeju United's top goalscorer in the 2015 K League Classic season, the reigning league champions Jeonbuk Hyundai Motors signed him for 1.5 million USD. On 15 February 2020, Ricardo Lopes joined top tier Chinese football club Shanghai SIPG. He joined J2 League club JEF United Chiba on 15 July 2022. 31 January 2023 Lopes joined the Ukrainian club Vorskla Poltava, and from 23 June the same year he returned to Korean football when he joined Suwon FC.

On 8 January 2024, Lopes signed with K League 2 club Busan IPark.

== Career statistics ==
As of match played 4 November 2024

Appearances and goals by club, season and competition
Club	Season	League			State League		National cup		Continental		Other		Total	
Club	Season	Division	Apps	Goals	Apps	Goals	Apps	Goals	Apps	Goals	Apps	Goals	Apps	Goals
Ituano	2012	Paulista	—		1 (Note: Appearances in Campeonato Paulista)	0	—		—		—		1	0
Gurupi	2013	Série D	9	1	0 (Note: Appearances in Campeonato Tocantinense)	0	2	0	—		—		11	1
Globo	2014	Série D	10	7	23 (Note: Appearances in Campeonato Potiguar)	16	0	0	—		—		33	23
Fortaleza (loan)	2014	Série C	2	0	0 (Note: Appearances in Campeonato Cearense)	0	0	0	—		—–		2	0
Jeju United (loan)	2015	K League Classic	33	11	—		3	0	—		—		36	11
Jeonbuk Hyundai Motors	2016	K League Classic	35	13	–		3	0	12 (Note: Appearances in AFC Champions League)	3	0 (Note: Appearances in FIFA Club World Cup)	0	50	16
Jeonbuk Hyundai Motors	2017	K League Classic	22	4	—		0	0	—		—		36	11
Jeonbuk Hyundai Motors	2018	K League Classic	31	13	—		3	0	8	4	—		42	17
Jeonbuk Hyundai Motors	2019	K League 1	36	11	—		1	0	7	1	—		44	12
Jeonbuk Hyundai Motors	Total		124	41	—		7	0	27	8	0	0	158	49
Shanghai SIPG	2020	Chinese Super League	17	5	—		1	0	6	1	—		24	6
Shanghai SIPG	2021	Chinese Super League	14	4	—		0	0	0	0	—		14	4
Shanghai SIPG	Total		31	9	—		1	0	6	1	—		38	10
JEF United Chiba	2022	J2 League	10	0	—		0	0	—		—		10	0
Vorskla Poltava	2022–23	Ukrainian Premier League	7	0	—		0	0	—		—		7	0
Suwon FC	2023	K League 1	14	3	—		—		—		2 (Note: Appearances in K League relegation play-off)	1	16	4
Busan IPark	2024	K League 2	14	0	—		1	0	—		—		15	0
Lamphun Warriors	2024–25	Thai League 1	8	2	—		0	0	—		0	0	8	2
Career total			262	74	24	17	13	10	33	9	2	1	353	115

== Honours ==
Jeonbuk Hyundai Motors

- K League 1: 2017, 2018, 2019
- AFC Champions League: 2016

Individual

- K League 1 Best XI: 2016, 2018
