= Cesinha (footballer, born 1989) =

Brazilian footballer (born 1989)

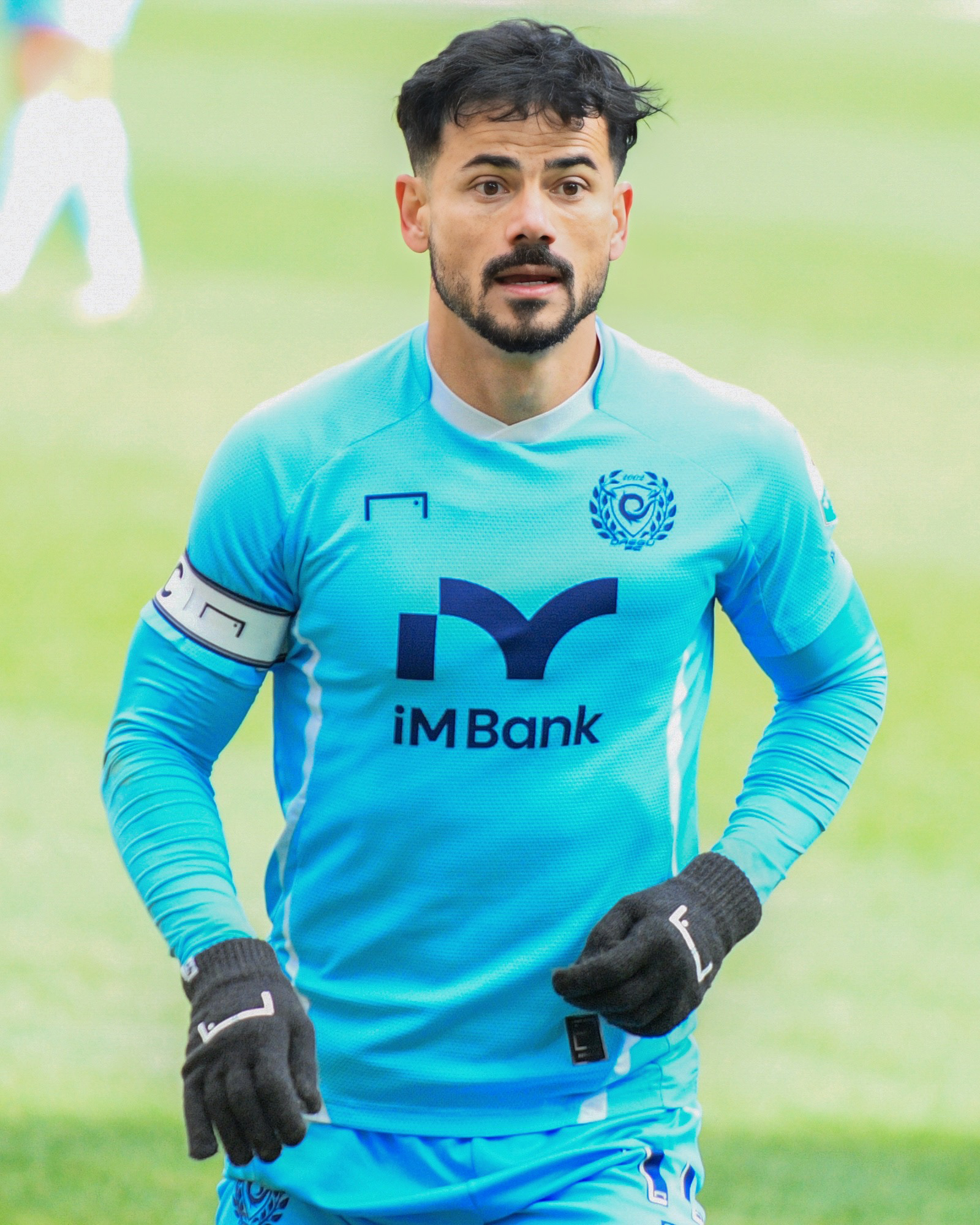
- Cesinha with Daegu FC in 2025

Personal information
- Full name: Cesar Fernando Silva dos Santos
- Date of birth: 29 November 1989 (age 36)
- Place of birth: São José do Rio Preto, Brazil
- Height: 1.76 m (5 ft 9 in)
- Positions: Forward; attacking midfielder

Team information
- Current team: Daegu FC
- Number: 11

Youth career
- 2007–2010: Corinthians

Senior career*
Years	Team	Apps	(Gls)
2010	Corinthians	0	(0)
2010	→ Osvaldo Cruz (loan)	8	(6)
2011	União Barbarense	18	(4)
2011	Pão de Açúcar	0	(0)
2012	União Barbarense	22	(9)
2012–2015	Bragantino	55	(6)
2013	→ União Barbarense (loan)	15	(5)
2014–2015	→ Atlético Mineiro (loan)	11	(0)
2015	→ Ponte Preta (loan)	17	(0)
2016–2017	→ Daegu FC (loan)	36	(11)
2017–	Daegu FC	258	(102)
- * Club domestic league appearances and goals as of 17 May 2026

Cesar Fernando Silva dos Santos (born 29 November 1989), commonly known as Cesinha, is a Brazilian professional footballer who plays for Daegu FC as a forward.

== Career ==
=== Early years in Brazil ===
Born in São José do Rio Preto, Brazil, Cesinha graduated with Corinthians youth system, but made his senior debuts while on loan at Osvaldo Cruz. After appearing for União Barbarense and Pão de Açúcar, he returned to the former on 7 December 2011. On 16 May 2012, Cesinha signed for Bragantino. After appearing sparingly, he returned to Barbarense in January of the following year, in a six-month loan deal. Cesinha returned to Braga in June 2013, appearing regularly afterwards. On 3 October of the following year he was loaned to Atlético Mineiro, until May 2015. Cesinha made his Série A debut on 9 October, replacing Luan in a 0–0 away draw against Fluminense. On 6 May 2015 he moved to fellow league team Ponte Preta, until December.

=== South Korea ===
In 2016, Cesinha joined South Korean club Daegu FC on loan. Scoring 11 goals, he helped secure the club's promotion that year from K League 2 to the top tier of football in South Korea, K League 1. His loan was made permanent the following year. By June 2020, he had lived in South Korea for five years, one of the criteria to become a citizen of the country. Media reported that Cesinha was keen to become a South Korean citizen and represent the country in international football.

== Career statistics ==
As of match played 17 May 2026

Appearances and goals by club, season and competition
Club	Season	League			State League		Cup		Continental		Other		Total	
Club	Season	Division	Apps	Goals	Apps	Goals	Apps	Goals	Apps	Goals	Apps	Goals	Apps	Goals
Corinthians	2010	Série A	—		—		0	0	—		—		0	0
Osvaldo Cruz (loan)	2010	Paulista A2	—		8	6	—		—		—		8	6
União Barbarense	2011	Paulista A2	—		18	4	—		—		—		18	4
Pão de Açúcar	2011	Paulista A2	—		0	0	—		—		—		0	0
União Barbarense	2012	Paulista A2	—		22	9	—		—		—		22	9
Bragantino	2012	Série B	11	1	—		—		—		—		11	1
Bragantino	2013	Série B	14	2	—		—		—		—		14	2
Bragantino	2014	Série B	18	2	12	1	5	2	—		—		35	5
Bragantino	Total		43	5	12	1	5	2	—		—		60	8
União Barbarense (loan)	2013	Paulista	—		15	5	—		—		—		15	5
Atlético Mineiro (loan)	2014	Série A	6	0	—		0	0	—		—		6	0
Atlético Mineiro (loan)	2015	Série A	—		5	0	—		1 (Note: Appearance in Copa Libertadores)	0	—		6	0
Atlético Mineiro (loan)	Total		6	0	5	0	0	0	1	0	—		12	0
Ponte Preta (loan)	2015	Série A	17	0	—		3	4	2 (Note: Appearances in Copa Sudamericana)	0	—		22	4
Daegu FC (loan)	2016	K League 2	36	11	—		2	3	—		—		38	14
Daegu FC	2017	K League 1	27	7	—		0	0	—		—		27	7
Daegu FC	2018	K League 1	25	8	—		6	5	—		—		31	13
Daegu FC	2019	K League 1	35	15	—		1	0	5 (Note: Appearances in AFC Champions League)	1	—		41	16
Daegu FC	2020	K League 1	25	18	—		2	1	—		—		27	19
Daegu FC	2021	K League 1	32	9	—		5	2	6	5	—		43	16
Daegu FC	2022	K League 1	29	12	—		3	0	2	1	—		34	13
Daegu FC	2023	K League 1	23	8	—		1	0	—		—		24	8
Daegu FC	2024	K League 1	30	11	—		0	0	—		2 (Note: Appearances in Relegation play-offs)	2	32	13
Daegu FC	2025	K League 1	25	12	—		1	1	—		—		26	13
Daegu FC	2026	K League 2	7	2	—		0	0	—		—		7	2
Daegu FC	Daegu total		294	113	—		23	12	13	7	2	2	332	134
Career total			333	118	80	25	30	14	16	7	2	2	471	166

== Honours ==
Atlético Mineiro

- Campeonato Mineiro: 2015
- Copa do Brasil: 2014

Daegu FC

- Korean FA Cup: 2018

Individual

- K League 2 Best XI: 2016
- K League 1 top assist provider: 2018, 2025
- Korean FA Cup Most Valuable Player: 2018
- Korean FA Cup top goalscorer: 2018
- K League All-Star: 2019, 2023, 2024
- K League All-Star Game Most Valuable Player: 2019
- K League 1 Best XI: 2019, 2020, 2021, 2022
