= 2018 K League 1 =

KEB Hana Bank K League 1
- Season: 2018
- Dates: 2 March – 2 December 2018
- Champions: Jeonbuk Hyundai Motors (6th title)
- Relegated: Jeonnam Dragons
- Champions League: Jeonbuk Hyundai Motors; Gyeongnam FC; Ulsan Hyundai; Daegu FC
- Matches: 228
- Goals: 620 (2.72 per match)
- Best player: Marcão
- Top goalscorer: Marcão (26 goals)
- Biggest home win: Gangwon 7–0 Incheon (19 August 2018)
- Biggest away win: Gyeongnam 0–4 Jeonbuk (11 April 2018); Seoul 0–4 Jeonbuk (20 May 2018)
- Highest scoring: Jeonnam 6–4 Suwon (19 August 2018)
- Longest winning run: 9 matches Jeonbuk Hyundai Motors
- Longest unbeaten run: 10 matches Jeonbuk Hyundai Motors
- Longest winless run: 14 matches Incheon United
- Longest losing run: 6 matches Daegu FC
- Highest attendance: 30,122; Seoul 2–1 Suwon (5 May 2018)
- Lowest attendance: 290; Sangju 0–1 Gangwon (24 November 2018)
- Average attendance: 5,381

The 2018 K League 1 was the 36th season of the top division of professional football in South Korea since its establishment in 1983, and the sixth season of the K League 1, former K League Classic. The K League Classic was changed its name to "K League 1" in this season. As the 2018 FIFA World Cup start on 14 June, the last round before stoppage will be held on 19–20 May. The league will resume games on 7 July.

== Teams ==
Locations of the 2018 K League 1 clubs

=== General information ===
| Club | City/Province | Manager | Owner(s) | Other sponsor(s) |
|---|---|---|---|---|
| Daegu FC | Daegu | (Brazil) Andre | Daegu Government | |
| Gangwon FC | Gangwon | (South Korea) Kim Byung-soo | Gangwon Provincial Government | |
| Gyeongnam FC | Gyeongnam | (South Korea) Kim Jong-boo | Gyeongnam Provincial Government | |
| Incheon United | Incheon | (Norway) Jørn Andersen | Incheon Government | Shinhan Bank; Incheon International Airport |
| Jeju United | Jeju | (South Korea) Jo Sung-hwan | SK Energy | |
| Jeonbuk Hyundai Motors | Jeonbuk | (South Korea) Choi Kang-hee | Hyundai Motor Company | |
| Jeonnam Dragons | Jeonnam | (South Korea) Kim In-wan (caretaker) | POSCO | |
| Pohang Steelers | Pohang, Gyeongbuk | (South Korea) Choi Soon-ho | POSCO | |
| Sangju Sangmu | Sangju, Gyeongbuk | (South Korea) Kim Tae-wan | Korea Armed Forces Athletic Corps | |
| FC Seoul | Seoul | (South Korea) Choi Yong-soo | GS Group | |
| Suwon Samsung Bluewings | Suwon, Gyeonggi | (South Korea) Seo Jung-won | Cheil Worldwide | Samsung Electronics; Maeil Dairies Industry |
| Ulsan Hyundai | Ulsan | (South Korea) Kim Do-hoon | Hyundai Heavy Industries | |

=== Stadiums ===
| Daegu FC | Gangwon FC | Gyeongnam FC | Incheon United | Jeju United | Jeonbuk Hyundai Motors |
|---|---|---|---|---|---|
| Daegu Stadium | Chuncheon Songam Leports Town | Changwon Football Center | Incheon Football Stadium | Jeju World Cup Stadium | Jeonju World Cup Stadium |
| Capacity: **66,422** | Capacity: **20,000** | Capacity: **20,245** | Capacity: **20,891** | Capacity: **35,657** | Capacity: **42,477** |
| Jeonnam Dragons | Pohang Steelers | Sangju Sangmu | FC Seoul | Suwon Samsung Bluewings | Ulsan Hyundai |
| Gwangyang Football Stadium | Pohang Steel Yard | Sangju Civic Stadium | Seoul World Cup Stadium | Suwon World Cup Stadium | Ulsan Munsu Football Stadium |
| Capacity: **13,496** | Capacity: **17,443** | Capacity: **15,042** | Capacity: **66,704** | Capacity: **44,031** | Capacity: **44,102** |

=== Foreign players ===
Restricting the number of foreign players strictly to four per team, including a slot for a player from AFC countries. A team could use four foreign players on the field each game including a least one player from the AFC confederation. Players name in bold are registered during the mid-season transfer window.

As of 26 May 2018

| Club | Player 1 | Player 2 | Player 3 | AFC player | Former players |
|---|---|---|---|---|---|
| Daegu FC | (Brazil) Césinha | (Brazil) **Edgar Silva** | (Brazil) **Zé Roberto** | (Japan) Tsubasa Nishi | (Brazil) Caion (Brazil) Jean Carlos |
| Gangwon FC | (Brazil) Diego Maurício | (Cyprus) Valentinos Sielis | (Serbia) Uroš Đerić | (Australia) Dylan McGowan | |
| Gyeongnam FC | (Brazil) Marcão | (Brazil) Negueba | (Brazil) **Paulinho** | (Japan) Takahiro Kunimoto | (Croatia) Ivan Herceg |
| Incheon United | (Bosnia and Herzegovina) Gordan Bunoza | (Costa Rica) Elías Aguilar | (Montenegro) Stefan Mugoša | (Australia) Kwabena Appiah | |
| Jeju United | (Brazil) Magno Cruz | (Brazil) Roberson | (Brazil) Tiago Marques | (Australia) Aleksandar Jovanović | |
| Jeonbuk Hyundai Motors | (Brazil) Adriano Michael Jackson | (Brazil) Ricardo Lopes | (Brazil) Tiago Alves | | |
| Jeonnam Dragons | (Brazil) Wanderson Carvalho | (Brazil) Wanderson Macedo | (Croatia) Vedran Jugović | (Australia) **James Donachie** | (Australia) Tomislav Mrčela |
| Pohang Steelers | (Brazil) Alemão | (Brazil) **Jucimar Teixeira** | (Brazil) Léo Gamalho | (Australia) Connor Chapman | (Brazil) Getterson |
| FC Seoul | (Brazil) Anderson Lopes | (Brazil) Evandro Paulista | (Serbia) **Bojan Matić** | | (Croatia) Ivan Kovačec |
| Suwon Samsung Bluewings | (Bosnia and Herzegovina) **Elvis Sarić** | (Brazil) Waguininho | (Montenegro) Dejan Damjanović | | (Australia) Matthew Jurman (Brazil) Cristovam |
| Ulsan Hyundai | (Austria) Richard Windbichler | (Brazil) Júnior Negrão | (United States) **Mix Diskerud** | (Japan) **Sergio Escudero** | (Croatia) Mislav Oršić (Japan) Yohei Toyoda |

== League table ==
| Pos | Team | Pld | W | D | L | GF | GA | GD | Pts | Qualification or relegation |
|---|---|---|---|---|---|---|---|---|---|---|
| 1 | Jeonbuk Hyundai Motors (C) | 38 | 26 | 8 | 4 | 75 | 31 | +44 | 86 | Qualification for Champions League group stage |
| 2 | Gyeongnam FC | 38 | 18 | 11 | 9 | 59 | 44 | +15 | 65 | Qualification for Champions League group stage |
| 3 | Ulsan Hyundai | 38 | 17 | 12 | 9 | 61 | 46 | +15 | 63 | Qualification for Champions League play-off round |
| 4 | Pohang Steelers | 38 | 15 | 9 | 14 | 47 | 48 | −1 | 54 | |
| 5 | Jeju United | 38 | 14 | 12 | 12 | 41 | 41 | 0 | 54 | |
| 6 | Suwon Samsung Bluewings | 38 | 13 | 11 | 14 | 53 | 54 | −1 | 50 | |
| 7 | Daegu FC | 38 | 14 | 8 | 16 | 47 | 56 | −9 | 50 | Qualification for Champions League group stage (Note: Qualified as champions of FA Cup.) |
| 8 | Gangwon FC | 38 | 12 | 10 | 16 | 56 | 60 | −4 | 46 | |
| 9 | Incheon United | 38 | 10 | 12 | 16 | 55 | 69 | −14 | 42 | |
| 10 | Sangju Sangmu | 38 | 10 | 10 | 18 | 41 | 52 | −11 | 40 | |
| 11 | FC Seoul (O) | 38 | 9 | 13 | 16 | 40 | 48 | −8 | 40 | Qualification for relegation play-offs |
| 12 | Jeonnam Dragons (R) | 38 | 8 | 8 | 22 | 43 | 69 | −26 | 32 | Relegation to K League 2 |

Source: K League
Rules for classification: 1) Points; 2) Goals scored; 3) Goal difference; 4) Wins; 5) Head-to-head points
(C) Champions; (O) Play-off winners; (R) Relegated

== Positions by matchday ==
Leaders
Qualification for Champions League group stage
Qualification for Champions League play-off round
Qualification for relegation play-offs
Relegation to K League 2

=== Round 1–33 ===
| Team ╲ Round | 1 | 2 | 3 | 4 | 5 | 6 | 7 | 8 | 9 | 10 | 11 | 12 | 13 | 14 | 15 | 16 | 17 | 18 | 19 | 20 | 21 | 22 | 23 | 24 | 25 | 26 | 27 | 28 | 29 | 30 | 31 | 32 | 33 |
|---|---|---|---|---|---|---|---|---|---|---|---|---|---|---|---|---|---|---|---|---|---|---|---|---|---|---|---|---|---|---|---|---|---|
| Jeonbuk Hyundai Motors | 3 | 4 | 4 | 3 | 2 | 1 | 1 | 1 | 1 | 1 | 1 | 1 | 1 | 1 | 1 | 1 | 1 | 1 | 1 | 1 | 1 | 1 | 1 | 1 | 1 | 1 | 1 | 1 | 1 | 1 | 1 | 1 | 1 |
| Gyeongnam FC | 2 | 2 | 1 | 1 | 1 | 2 | 3 | 3 | 4 | 4 | 3 | 2 | 4 | 5 | 4 | 4 | 2 | 2 | 2 | 2 | 2 | 2 | 2 | 2 | 2 | 2 | 2 | 2 | 2 | 2 | 2 | 2 | 2 |
| Ulsan Hyundai | 11 | 11 | 12 | 12 | 11 | 10 | 6 | 8 | 7 | 7 | 8 | 6 | 6 | 6 | 5 | 5 | 5 | 5 | 5 | 5 | 4 | 4 | 4 | 3 | 3 | 3 | 3 | 3 | 3 | 3 | 3 | 3 | 3 |
| Suwon Samsung Bluewings | 9 | 5 | 5 | 5 | 5 | 3 | 2 | 2 | 2 | 2 | 2 | 3 | 2 | 2 | 3 | 2 | 3 | 3 | 3 | 3 | 3 | 3 | 3 | 4 | 4 | 4 | 4 | 4 | 4 | 5 | 5 | 5 | 4 |
| Pohang Steelers | 1 | 1 | 3 | 2 | 3 | 4 | 4 | 4 | 6 | 6 | 7 | 8 | 7 | 8 | 8 | 9 | 9 | 8 | 7 | 7 | 6 | 6 | 5 | 6 | 5 | 5 | 5 | 5 | 5 | 4 | 4 | 4 | 5 |
| Jeju United | 7 | 10 | 7 | 8 | 8 | 6 | 5 | 6 | 3 | 3 | 4 | 4 | 3 | 3 | 2 | 3 | 4 | 4 | 4 | 4 | 5 | 5 | 8 | 8 | 8 | 8 | 7 | 7 | 8 | 7 | 7 | 6 | 6 |
| Gangwon FC | 5 | 3 | 2 | 4 | 4 | 5 | 7 | 5 | 8 | 8 | 5 | 7 | 8 | 7 | 7 | 6 | 6 | 6 | 6 | 6 | 7 | 8 | 7 | 5 | 6 | 6 | 6 | 6 | 6 | 6 | 6 | 7 | 7 |
| Daegu FC | 12 | 12 | 11 | 11 | 12 | 12 | 11 | 11 | 12 | 12 | 12 | 12 | 12 | 12 | 12 | 11 | 11 | 11 | 11 | 12 | 10 | 10 | 10 | 10 | 10 | 10 | 9 | 10 | 7 | 7 | 8 | 8 | 8 |
| FC Seoul | 6 | 9 | 10 | 10 | 10 | 9 | 9 | 9 | 9 | 9 | 9 | 9 | 9 | 9 | 9 | 8 | 8 | 7 | 8 | 9 | 8 | 7 | 6 | 7 | 7 | 7 | 8 | 8 | 9 | 9 | 9 | 9 | 9 |
| Sangju Sangmu | 10 | 8 | 8 | 9 | 9 | 7 | 8 | 7 | 5 | 5 | 6 | 5 | 5 | 4 | 6 | 7 | 7 | 9 | 9 | 8 | 9 | 9 | 9 | 9 | 9 | 9 | 10 | 9 | 10 | 10 | 10 | 10 | 10 |
| Jeonnam Dragons | 4 | 7 | 9 | 7 | 7 | 11 | 12 | 12 | 10 | 10 | 10 | 10 | 10 | 10 | 10 | 10 | 10 | 10 | 10 | 11 | 12 | 12 | 12 | 11 | 12 | 11 | 11 | 11 | 11 | 11 | 11 | 11 | 11 |
| Incheon United | 8 | 6 | 6 | 6 | 6 | 8 | 10 | 10 | 11 | 11 | 11 | 11 | 11 | 11 | 11 | 12 | 12 | 12 | 12 | 10 | 11 | 11 | 11 | 12 | 11 | 12 | 12 | 12 | 12 | 12 | 12 | 12 | 12 |

Source: K League

=== Round 34–38 ===
| Team ╲ Round | 34 | 35 | 36 | 37 | 38 |
|---|---|---|---|---|---|
| Jeonbuk Hyundai Motors | 1 | 1 | 1 | 1 | 1 |
| Gyeongnam FC | 3 | 3 | 2 | 2 | 2 |
| Ulsan Hyundai | 2 | 2 | 3 | 3 | 3 |
| Pohang Steelers | 5 | 4 | 4 | 4 | 4 |
| Jeju United | 6 | 6 | 6 | 5 | 5 |
| Suwon Samsung Bluewings | 4 | 5 | 5 | 6 | 6 |
| Daegu FC | 7 | 8 | 7 | 7 | 7 |
| Gangwon FC | 8 | 7 | 8 | 8 | 8 |
| Incheon United | 12 | 11 | 11 | 10 | 9 |
| Sangju Sangmu | 10 | 10 | 10 | 11 | 10 |
| FC Seoul | 9 | 9 | 9 | 9 | 11 |
| Jeonnam Dragons | 11 | 12 | 12 | 12 | 12 |

Source: K League

== Results ==
=== Matches 1–22 ===
Teams play each other twice, once at home, once away.

| Home \ Away | DGU | GWN | GNM | ICU | JJU | JHM | JND | PHS | SJS | SEO | SSB | USH |
|---|---|---|---|---|---|---|---|---|---|---|---|---|
| Daegu FC | — | 2–1 | 0–2 | 2–1 | 1–4 | 1–3 | 1–1 | 0–1 | 1–2 | 2–2 | 0–2 | 0–2 |
| Gangwon FC | 0–3 | — | 1–3 | 2–1 | 3–1 | 0–2 | 1–1 | 0–0 | 2–1 | 1–1 | 2–3 | 3–3 |
| Gyeongnam FC | 1–1 | 0–1 | — | 3–0 | 2–0 | 0–4 | 3–0 | 2–0 | 3–1 | 0–0 | 2–2 | 0–0 |
| Incheon United | 0–0 | 3–3 | 2–3 | — | 1–2 | 3–2 | 2–2 | 1–2 | 0–1 | 2–1 | 2–3 | 1–1 |
| Jeju United | 1–2 | 3–5 | 0–0 | 4–2 | — | 0–1 | 1–0 | 0–0 | 0–0 | 0–0 | 0–1 | 1–1 |
| Jeonbuk Hyundai Motors | 2–1 | 3–1 | 0–1 | 3–3 | 1–0 | — | 3–0 | 0–3 | 1–0 | 2–1 | 2–0 | 2–0 |
| Jeonnam Dragons | 1–1 | 1–4 | 1–3 | 1–3 | 0–3 | 0–0 | — | 2–3 | 2–0 | 2–1 | 0–2 | 1–2 |
| Pohang Steelers | 3–0 | 0–0 | 2–1 | 0–0 | 0–1 | 0–2 | 3–1 | — | 0–2 | 0–3 | 1–1 | 2–1 |
| Sangju Sangmu | 0–1 | 3–0 | 0–1 | 3–2 | 0–0 | 0–2 | 1–1 | 2–1 | — | 1–2 | 1–1 | 2–3 |
| FC Seoul | 3–0 | 1–2 | 2–3 | 1–1 | 3–0 | 0–4 | 2–1 | 2–1 | 0–0 | — | 2–1 | 1–1 |
| Suwon Samsung Bluewings | 2–0 | 2–0 | 3–1 | 5–2 | 2–3 | 0–3 | 1–2 | 1–1 | 2–1 | 0–0 | — | 0–0 |
| Ulsan Hyundai | 2–0 | 3–1 | 1–1 | 2–1 | 0–1 | 0–2 | 1–1 | 2–1 | 0–2 | 1–0 | 1–0 | — |

Source: K League
Legend: Blue = home team win; Yellow = draw; Red = away team win.

=== Matches 23–33 ===
Teams play every other team once (either at home or away).

| Home \ Away | DGU | GWN | GNM | ICU | JJU | JHM | JND | PHS | SJS | SEO | SSB | USH |
|---|---|---|---|---|---|---|---|---|---|---|---|---|
| Daegu FC | — | 2–0 | 2–2 | 1–2 | — | — | 2–1 | — | — | — | 4–2 | 0–2 |
| Gangwon FC | — | — | — | 7–0 | — | — | — | 1–1 | 2–3 | 0–0 | 1–0 | — |
| Gyeongnam FC | — | 2–1 | — | — | 0–1 | 0–2 | — | — | 2–1 | 2–1 | — | 3–3 |
| Incheon United | — | — | 2–2 | — | — | — | 3–1 | — | 0–0 | — | 0–0 | 3–2 |
| Jeju United | 2–3 | 2–2 | — | 0–0 | — | — | 1–0 | — | — | 1–0 | 0–0 | — |
| Jeonbuk Hyundai Motors | 2–1 | 3–2 | — | 3–2 | 4–0 | — | 1–0 | — | — | — | — | — |
| Jeonnam Dragons | — | 0–1 | 3–3 | — | — | — | — | 3–2 | — | 1–0 | 6–4 | 1–0 |
| Pohang Steelers | 2–1 | — | 0–3 | 1–0 | 2–2 | 5–2 | — | — | — | — | — | — |
| Sangju Sangmu | 2–5 | — | — | — | 1–1 | 2–2 | 1–2 | 1–2 | — | — | 1–2 | — |
| FC Seoul | 0–2 | — | — | 1–1 | — | 1–2 | — | 0–1 | 2–2 | — | — | — |
| Suwon Samsung Bluewings | — | — | 1–0 | — | — | 0–0 | — | 2–0 | — | 1–2 | — | 2–2 |
| Ulsan Hyundai | — | 2–0 | — | — | 3–2 | 2–2 | — | 2–0 | 4–1 | 4–1 | — | — |

Source: K League
Legend: Blue = home team win; Yellow = draw; Red = away team win.

=== Matches 34–38 ===
After 33 matches, the league splits into two sections of six teams each, with teams playing every other team in their section once (either at home or away). The exact matches are determined upon the league table at the time of the split.

==== Group A ====
| Home \ Away | GNM | JHM | JJU | PHS | SSB | USH |
|---|---|---|---|---|---|---|
| Gyeongnam FC | — | — | — | 1–2 | 2–1 | — |
| Jeonbuk Hyundai Motors | 1–1 | — | — | — | 2–0 | 3–1 |
| Jeju United | 0–1 | 0–0 | — | — | — | — |
| Pohang Steelers | — | 1–1 | 1–2 | — | — | 1–3 |
| Suwon Samsung Bluewings | — | — | 0–2 | 1–3 | — | 3–3 |
| Ulsan Hyundai | 1–0 | — | 0–1 | — | — | — |

Source: K League
Legend: Blue = home team win; Yellow = draw; Red = away team win.

==== Group B ====
| Home \ Away | DGU | GWN | ICU | JND | SJS | SEO |
|---|---|---|---|---|---|---|
| Daegu FC | — | — | — | — | 0–0 | 1–1 |
| Gangwon FC | 0–1 | — | 2–3 | 1–0 | — | — |
| Incheon United | 0–1 | — | — | 3–1 | 2–1 | — |
| Jeonnam Dragons | 1–2 | — | — | — | 0–1 | — |
| Sangju Sangmu | — | 0–1 | — | — | — | 1–0 |
| FC Seoul | — | 1–1 | 0–1 | 3–2 | — | — |

Source: K League
Legend: Blue = home team win; Yellow = draw; Red = away team win.

== Relegation play-offs ==
The promotion-relegation play-offs were held between the winners of the 2018 K League 2 play-offs and the 11th-placed club of the 2018 K League 1. The winners on aggregate score after both matches earned entry into the 2019 K League 1.

6 December 2018
19:00 KST

| Busan IPark | 1–3 | FC Seoul |
|---|---|---|
| Rômulo 24' | Report | Cho Young-wook 58'; Go Yo-han 78'; Jung Hyun-cheol 89' |

Busan Gudeok Stadium, Busan
Attendance: 10,127
Referee: Kim Woo-sung

9 December 2018
14:10 KST

| FC Seoul | 1–1 | Busan IPark |
|---|---|---|
| Park Chu-young 90+3' | Report | Kim Jin-kyu 32' |

Seoul World Cup Stadium, Seoul
Attendance: 8,554
Referee: Kim Dae-yong

FC Seoul won 4–2 on aggregate and therefore both clubs remain in their respective leagues.

== Player statistics ==
=== Top scorers ===
| Rank | Player | Club | Goals |
|---|---|---|---|
| 1 | (Brazil) Marcão | Gyeongnam FC | 26 |
| 2 | (Serbia) Uroš Đerić | Gangwon FC | 24 |
| 3 | (Brazil) Júnior Negrão | Ulsan Hyundai | 22 |
| 4 | (Montenegro) Stefan Mugoša | Incheon United | 19 |
| 5 | (South Korea) Moon Seon-min | Incheon United | 14 |
| 6 | (Brazil) Ricardo Lopes | Jeonbuk Hyundai Motors | 13 |
| 6 | (Montenegro) Dejan Damjanović | Suwon Samsung Bluewings | 13 |
| 6 | (South Korea) Lee Dong-gook | Jeonbuk Hyundai Motors | 13 |
| 9 | (South Korea) Kim Shin-wook | Jeonbuk Hyundai Motors | 11 |
| 10 | (South Korea) Heo Yong-joon | Jeonnam Dragons | 9 |

=== Top assist providers ===
| Rank | Player | Club | Assists |
|---|---|---|---|
| 1 | (Brazil) Cesinha | Daegu FC | 11 |
| 2 | (Costa Rica) Elías Aguilar | Incheon United | 10 |
| 3 | (South Korea) Lee Yong | Jeonbuk Hyundai Motors | 9 |
| 4 | (South Korea) Hong Chul | Sangju Sangmu; Suwon Samsung Bluewings | 8 |
| 5 | (South Korea) Han Seung-gyu | Ulsan Hyundai | 7 |
| 5 | (Brazil) Negueba | Gyeongnam FC | 7 |

== Awards ==
=== Main awards ===
The 2018 K League Awards was held on 3 December 2018.

| Award | Winner | Club |
|---|---|---|
| Most Valuable Player | (Brazil) Marcão | Gyeongnam FC |
| Top goalscorer | (Brazil) Marcão | Gyeongnam FC |
| Top assist provider | (Brazil) Cesinha | Daegu FC |
| Young Player of the Year | (South Korea) Han Seung-gyu | Ulsan Hyundai |
| Manager of the Year | (South Korea) Choi Kang-hee | Jeonbuk Hyundai Motors |

=== Best XI ===
| Position | Winner | Club |
|---|---|---|
| Goalkeeper | (South Korea) Jo Hyeon-woo | Daegu FC |
| Defenders | (South Korea) Hong Chul | Suwon Samsung Bluewings |
| Defenders | (South Korea) Kim Min-jae | Jeonbuk Hyundai Motors |
| Defenders | (Austria) Richard Windbichler | Ulsan Hyundai |
| Defenders | (South Korea) Lee Yong | Jeonbuk Hyundai Motors |
| Midfielders | (Brazil) Negueba | Gyeongnam FC |
| Midfielders | (South Korea) Choi Young-jun | Gyeongnam FC |
| Midfielders | (Costa Rica) Elías Aguilar | Incheon United |
| Midfielders | (Brazil) Ricardo Lopes | Jeonbuk Hyundai Motors |
| Forwards | (Brazil) Marcão | Gyeongnam FC |
| Forwards | (Brazil) Júnior Negrão | Ulsan Hyundai |

=== Player of the Round ===
| Round | Winner | Club |
|---|---|---|
| 1 | (South Korea) Lee Dong-gook | Jeonbuk Hyundai Motors |
| 2 | (South Korea) Moon Seon-min | Incheon United |
| 3 | (South Korea) Kim Min-jae | Jeonbuk Hyundai Motors |
| 4 | (Brazil) Marcão | Gyeongnam FC |
| 5 | (Montenegro) Stefan Mugoša | Incheon United |
| 6 | (South Korea) Kim Shin-wook | Jeonbuk Hyundai Motors |
| 7 | (South Korea) Lee Dong-gook | Jeonbuk Hyundai Motors |
| 8 | (Serbia) Uroš Đerić | Gangwon FC |
| 9 | (South Korea) Lee Ki-je | Suwon Samsung Bluewings |
| 10 | (South Korea) Kwon Soon-hyung | Jeju United |
| 11 | (Serbia) Uroš Đerić | Gangwon FC |
| 12 | (Brazil) Anderson Lopes | FC Seoul |
| 13 | (South Korea) Kim Seung-dae | Pohang Steelers |
| 14 | (South Korea) Lim Sun-young | Jeonbuk Hyundai Motors |
| 15 | (Brazil) Ricardo Lopes | Jeonbuk Hyundai Motors |
| 16 | (South Korea) Hong Jeong-woon | Daegu FC |
| 17 | (Brazil) Ricardo Lopes | Jeonbuk Hyundai Motors |
| 18 | (South Korea) Yeom Ki-hun | Suwon Samsung Bluewings |
| 19 | (Serbia) Uroš Đerić | Gangwon FC |

| Round | Winner | Club |
|---|---|---|
| 20 | (Brazil) Marcão | Gyeongnam FC |
| 21 | (South Korea) Kim Dae-won | Daegu FC |
| 22 | (Brazil) Tiago Alves | Jeonbuk Hyundai Motors |
| 23 | (South Korea) Lee Seok-hyun | Pohang Steelers |
| 24 | (Serbia) Uroš Đerić | Gangwon FC |
| 25 | (South Korea) Moon Seon-min | Incheon United |
| 26 | (Brazil) Júnior Negrão | Ulsan Hyundai |
| 27 | (Brazil) Cesinha | Daegu FC |
| 28 | (South Korea) Han Kyo-won | Jeonbuk Hyundai Motors |
| 29 | (Brazil) Edgar Silva | Daegu FC |
| 30 | (South Korea) Kim Do-hyeong | Pohang Steelers |
| 31 | (South Korea) Lee Jin-hyun | Pohang Steelers |
| 32 | (South Korea) Kim In-sung | Ulsan Hyundai |
| 33 | (South Korea) Lee Dong-gook | Jeonbuk Hyundai Motors |
| 34 | (Brazil) Ricardo Lopes | Jeonbuk Hyundai Motors |
| 35 | (Montenegro) Stefan Mugoša | Incheon United |
| 36 | (Montenegro) Dejan Damjanović | Suwon Samsung Bluewings |
| 37 | (South Korea) Lee Chang-keun | Jeju United |
| 38 | (South Korea) Yoon Bit-garam | Sangju Sangmu |

=== Manager of the Month ===
| Month | Manager | Club | Division |
|---|---|---|---|
| March | (South Korea) Jung Gab-suk | Bucheon FC 1995 | K League 2 |
| April | (South Korea) Choi Kang-hee | Jeonbuk Hyundai Motors | K League 1 |
| May | (South Korea) Nam Ki-il | Seongnam FC | K League 2 |
| July | (South Korea) Kim Jong-boo | Gyeongnam FC | K League 1 |
| August | (South Korea) Ko Jong-soo | Daejeon Citizen | K League 2 |
| September | (South Korea) Ko Jong-soo | Daejeon Citizen | K League 2 |
| October | (South Korea) Jo Sung-hwan | Jeju United | K League 1 |

== Attendance ==
Attendants who entered with free ticket are not counted.

| Pos | Team | Total | High | Low | Average | Change |
|---|---|---|---|---|---|---|
| 1 | Jeonbuk Hyundai Motors | 226,224 | 19,108 | 5,005 | 11,907 | +1.9% |
| 2 | FC Seoul | 219,665 | 30,122 | 4,714 | 11,561 | −29.1% |
| 3 | Ulsan Hyundai | 142,944 | 14,228 | 1,059 | 7,523 | −11.1% |
| 4 | Pohang Steelers | 140,668 | 15,393 | 3,073 | 7,404 | −11.6% |
| 5 | Suwon Samsung Bluewings | 114,943 | 13,853 | 2,940 | 6,709 | −23.6% |
| 6 | Incheon United | 84,151 | 7,282 | 1,402 | 4,429 | −25.3% |
| 7 | Daegu FC | 66,837 | 13,351 | 477 | 3,518 | +5.3% |
| 8 | Jeonnam Dragons | 62,615 | 11,036 | 1,830 | 3,296 | −19.8% |
| 9 | Gyeongnam FC | 62,615 | 13,082 | 932 | 3,170 | +32.3%^{†} |
| 10 | Jeju United | 60,033 | 8,354 | 1,215 | 3,160 | −22.1% |
| 11 | Gangwon FC | 25,765 | 4,530 | 569 | 1,356 | −41.2% |
| 12 | Sangju Sangmu | 25,050 | 2,317 | 290 | 1,318 | −19.9% |
| | League total | 1,241,667 | 30,122 | 290 | 5,445 | −16.3% |

Updated to games played on 7 December 2018
Source: K League
Notes:
^{†} Teams that played previous season in K League Challenge.

== See also ==
- 2018 in South Korean football
- 2018 K League 2
- 2018 Korean FA Cup
