= Olivier Bonnes =

Nigerien footballer (born 1990)

Personal information
- Full name: Olivier Harouna Bonnes
- Date of birth: 7 February 1990 (age 36)
- Place of birth: Niamey, Niger
- Height: 1.87 m (6 ft 2 in)
- Position: Defensive midfielder

Team information
- Current team: Nonthaburi United
- Number: 34

Senior career*
Years	Team	Apps	(Gls)
2006–2011	Nantes B	20	(1)
2009–2011	Nantes	2	(0)
2011–2012	Lille B	5	(0)
2012–2013	Brussels	26	(4)
2014–2015	Vereya	16	(0)
2015	Lokomotiv Plovdiv	15	(0)
2016	Montana	10	(0)
2016–2018	Gwangju	46	(1)
2018	Seongnam	15	(0)
2019	Kokand 1912	0	(0)
2020–2021	Hwaseong FC	10	(0)
2021–	Nonthaburi United	0	(0)

International career^{‡}
2011–	Niger	13	(0)
- * Club domestic league appearances and goals as of 10:06, 22 September 2020 (UTC) ‡ National team caps and goals as of 19:47, 25 July 2016 (UTC)

Olivier Harouna Bonnes (born 7 February 1990) is a Nigerien international footballer who plays as a defensive midfielder for Nonthaburi United.

== Club career ==
Born in Niamey, Bonnes has played in France and Belgium for Nantes B, Nantes, Lille B and Brussels.

On 24 September 2014, Bonnes signed with Bulgarian club Vereya. He also played in Bulgaria for Lokomotiv Plovdiv and Montana.

On 25 July 2016, Bonnes signed with South Korean club Gwangju FC.

In July 2018, Bonnes signed with South Korean club Seongnam FC.

In February 2019 he moved to Uzbek club Kokand 1912.

== International career ==
Bonnes made his international debut for Niger in 2011, earning a total of 9 caps with them between 2011 and 2012, including one appearance in a FIFA World Cup qualifying match. He played at the 2012 Africa Cup of Nations.

== Personal life ==
He holds Nigerien and French nationalities.
