= Jo Sung-hwan =

South Korean footballer and manager (born 1970)

Jo Sung-hwan 조성환
Personal information
- Date of birth: 16 October 1970 (age 56)
- Place of birth: South Korea
- Height: 1.71 m (5 ft 7 in)
- Position: Defender

Team information
- Current team: Busan IPark

Senior career*
Years	Team	Apps	(Gls)
1993–2001	Yukong Elephants / Bucheon SK	138	(2)
2003	Jeonbuk Hyundai Motors	31	(0)
Total		169	(2)

Managerial career
- 2002: Jeonbuk Hyundai Motors
- ?: Masan Technical High School
- 2009–2012: Jeonbuk Hyundai Motors (youth)
- 2013–2014: Jeju United (coach)
- 2015–2019: Jeju United
- 2020–2024: Incheon United
- 2024-: Busan IPark
- * Club domestic league appearances and goals as of 26 July 2008 ‡ National team caps and goals as of 26 July 2008

- Jo Sung-hwan
- Hangul: 조성환
- Hanja: 趙城煥
- RR: Jo Seonghwan
- MR: Cho Sŏnghwan

Jo Sung-hwan (born 16 October 1970, in South Korea) is the manager of Busan IPark, having previously managed Incheon United. He played at Jeju United (then known as Yukong Elephants and Bucheon SK) and Jeonbuk Hyundai Motors. He was appointed manager of Jeju United on 12 December 2014.

== Managing career ==
- Jeju United FC 2015–2019
- Incheon United FC 2020–2024
- Busan IPark 2024-
