= 2013 Gangwon FC season =

Gangwon FC
2013 season
- Chairman: Gangwon provincial governor
- Manager: Kim Yong-Kab
- K League Classic: 12th, relegated
- Korean FA Cup: Round of 16
- Top goalscorer: League: Ianis Zicu (6); Choi Jin-Ho (6); All: Ianis Zicu (8)
- Highest home attendance: 10,456 vs Gyeongnam (October 5)
- Lowest home attendance: 896 vs Daegu (November 27)
- Average home league attendance: 2,884
| Home colours | Away colours |

The 2013 season is Gangwon FC's fifth season in the K League Classic in South Korea. Gangwon FC is competing in K League Classic and Korean FA Cup.

== Current squad ==
Note: Flags indicate national team as defined under FIFA eligibility rules; some limited exceptions apply. Players may hold more than one non-FIFA nationality.

| No. | Pos. | Nation | Player |
|---|---|---|---|
| 1 | GK | KOR | Park Ho-Jin |
| 2 | DF | KOR | Choi Woo-Jae |
| 4 | DF | KOR | Park Min |
| 5 | DF | KOR | Bae Hyo-Sung (Vice-captain) |
| 6 | MF | KOR | Jin Kyung-Sun |
| 7 | FW | KOR | Kang Jung-Hun (loan from FC Seoul) |
| 8 | DF | KOR | Chun Jae-Ho (Captain) |
| 9 | FW | BRA | Wesley (loan from Atlético Mineiro) |
| 11 | FW | KOR | Kim Jin-Yong |
| 12 | FW | KOR | Choi Seung-In |
| 13 | DF | KOR | Park Sang-Jin |
| 14 | DF | KOR | Kim Jin-Hwan |
| 15 | DF | KOR | Namgung Woong |
| 16 | MF | KOR | Lee Jun-Yeob |
| 17 | MF | KOR | Moon Byung-Woo |
| 19 | FW | KOR | Kim Dong-Ki |
| 20 | DF | KOR | Kim Oh-Gyu |
| 21 | GK | KOR | Kim Keun-Bae |

| No. | Pos. | Nation | Player |
|---|---|---|---|
| 22 | FW | KOR | Choi Jin-Ho |
| 23 | DF | KOR | Lee Jae-Hun |
| 24 | MF | KOR | Lee Woo-Hyeok |
| 25 | DF | KOR | Lee Chang-Yong |
| 26 | MF | KOR | Kim Hyo-Jin |
| 27 | MF | KOR | Kim Bong-Jin |
| 29 | MF | KOR | Lee Jong-Chan |
| 31 | FW | KOR | Kim Yun-Ho |
| 32 | FW | KOR | You Jae-Won |
| 36 | DF | KOR | Kim Young-Yun |
| 37 | DF | KOR | Ko Gi-Hun |
| 38 | DF | KOR | Park Moon-Ho |
| 40 | MF | KOR | Lee Bong-Jun |
| 41 | GK | KOR | Lee Keun-Pyo |
| 42 | DF | KOR | Kim Dae-San |
| 44 | DF | KOR | Kim Dong-Ho |
| 45 | MF | KOR | Lee Jong-In |
| 83 | FW | ROU | Ianis Zicu |

=== Out on loan ===
Note: Flags indicate national team as defined under FIFA eligibility rules; some limited exceptions apply. Players may hold more than one non-FIFA nationality.

| No. | Pos. | Nation | Player |
|---|---|---|---|
| — | FW | KOR | Kim Young-Hoo (to Police FC for military service) |
| — | MF | KOR | Kim Moon-Soo (to Police FC for military service) |
| — | FW | KOR | Kim Jung-Joo (to Gangneung City FC) |
| — | GK | KOR | Song Yoo-Geol (to Police FC for military service) |

| No. | Pos. | Nation | Player |
|---|---|---|---|
| — | MF | KOR | Baek Jong-Hwan (to Sangju Sangmu Phoenix for military service) |
| — | FW | KOR | Jang Hyuk-Jin (to Sangju Sangmu Phoenix for military service) |
| — | FW | KOR | Han Dong-Won (to FC Anyang) |
| — | FW | KOR | Kim Eun-Jung (to Pohang Steelers) |

== Transfer ==
=== 2012–13 Winter ===
In:

| No. | Pos. | Nation | Player |
|---|---|---|---|
| — | MF | KOR | Jin Kyung-sun (from Jeonbuk Hyundai Motors) |
| — | FW | KOR | Kim Jin-yong (loan return from Pohang Steelers) |
| — | DF | KOR | Lee Bong-jun (free agent, former Gangneung City) |
| — | GK | KOR | Lee Geun-pyo (free agent, former Gyeongnam FC) |
| — | MF | KOR | Lee Jong-in (unattached, former Icheon Citizen) |
| — | MF | KOR | Moon Byung-woo (free agent, former Incheon Korail) |
| — | DF | KOR | Namgung Woong (unattached, former Seongnam Ilhwa Chunma) |
| — | GK | KOR | Park Ho-jin (free agent, former Gwangju FC) |
| — | DF | KOR | Park Min (free agent, former Gwangju FC) |
| — | MF | BRA | Patrik (loan from (Brazil) Palmeiras) |
| — | FW | BRA | Wesley (loan from (Brazil) Atlético Mineiro) |
| — | FW | ROU | Ianis Zicu (from Pohang Steelers) |
| — | FW | KOR | Choi Seung-in (from Cheongju Jikji) |
| — | DF | KOR | Choi Woo-jae (from Chung-Ang University) |
| — | DF | KOR | Im Dong-seon (from Myongji University) |
| — | DF | KOR | Jeon Hun (from Sangji University) |
| — | DF | KOR | Kang Kyung-mook (from Kwangwoon University) |
| — | MF | KOR | Kim Bong-jin (from Dong-eui University) |
| — | DF | KOR | Kim Dae-san (from Sejong University) |
| — | DF | KOR | Kim Dong-ho (from Namyangju United) |
| — | MF | KOR | Kim Hyo-jin (from Yonsei University) |
| — | FW | KOR | Kim Yun-ho (from Kwandong University) |
| — | DF | KOR | Kim Young-yun (from Dongguk University) |
| — | MF | KOR | Ko Gi-hun (from Gwangju Gwangsan) |
| — | DF | KOR | Lee Chang-yong (from Yong In University) |
| — | MF | KOR | Lee Jong-chan (from Gangneung City) |
| — | MF | KOR | Lee Jun-yeob (from Incheon Korail) |
| — | DF | KOR | Lee Sung-hyun (from Hanmin University) |
| — | MF | KOR | Park Dong-sin (from Kyungwoon University) |
| — | DF | KOR | Park Han-bin (from Seoul United) |
| — | MF | KOR | Park Ji-hoon (from Cheongju University) |
| — | MF | KOR | Park Moon-ho (from Hanzhong University) |
| — | FW | KOR | You Jae-won (from Korea University) |

Out:

| No. | Pos. | Nation | Player |
|---|---|---|---|
| 2 | MF | KOR | Lee Sang-don (to FC Pocheon, military service) |
| 3 | DF | KOR | Lee Min-kyu (to Chungju Hummel, free agent) |
| 4 | DF | KOR | Oh Jae-suk (to (Japan) Gamba Osaka) |
| 6 | MF | BIH | Muhamed Džakmić (to (Bosnia and Herzegovina) FK Sarajevo, free agent) |
| 7 | MF | KOR | Baek Jong-hwan (to Sangju Sangmu Phoenix, army) |
| 9 | FW | KOR | Shim Young-sung (loan return to Jeju United) |
| 10 | MF | JPN | Yusuke Shimada (retired) |
| 11 | MF | KOR | Kim Myung-joong (retired) |
| 16 | FW | KOR | Kim Jung-joo (loan to Gangneung City) |
| 17 | FW | KOR | Jung Sung-min (to Gyeongnam FC, free agent) |
| 19 | FW | BRA | Weslley (loan return to (Brazil) SC Corinthians) |
| 20 | MF | KOR | Kim Tae-min (to (China) Chongqing FC, free agent) |
| 21 | GK | KOR | Song Yoo-geol (to Police FC, army) |
| 25 | MF | KOR | Oh Won-jong (free agent) |
| 26 | MF | KOR | Jang Suk-min (free agent) |
| 27 | MF | KOR | Chang Hyuk-jin (to Sangju Sangmu Phoenix, army) |
| 28 | DF | KOR | Lee Jun-hyung (to Cheongju Jikji, military service) |
| 30 | FW | KOR | Ko Min-joo (free agent) |
| 31 | GK | KOR | Yang Han-been (to Seongnam Ilhwa Chunma, free agent) |
| 32 | MF | KOR | Kim Jong-gook (loan return to Ulsan Hyundai) |
| 33 | DF | KOR | Park Woo-hyun (free agent) |
| 34 | FW | KOR | Kim Do-Hoon (to Police FC, army) |
| 36 | DF | KOR | Na Byung-hwan (free agent) |
| 37 | DF | KOR | Ma Sang-hoon (free agent) |
| 38 | DF | KOR | Yang Yun-heok (to FC Pocheon, free agent) |
| 39 | MF | KOR | Moon Kyung-min (free agent) |
| 40 | FW | KOR | Park Jae-Bum (free agent) |
| 41 | DF | KOR | Ham Min-seok (free agent) |
| 42 | DF | KOR | Lee Yoon-ho (withdrawal) |
| 43 | DF | KOR | Kang Min-woo (free agent) |
| 77 | DF | KOR | Lee Yoon-eui (to Bucheon FC 1995, free agent) |
| 83 | FW | ROU | Ianis Zicu (loan return to Pohang Steelers) |
| 99 | MF | KOR | Park Jung-hoon (loan return to Chunnam Dragons) |

=== 2013 Summer ===
In:

| No. | Pos. | Nation | Player |
|---|---|---|---|
| — | MF | KOR | Choi Jin-Ho (free agent, former Busan IPark) |
| — | FW | KOR | Kim Young-Hoo (from Police FC) |

Out:

| No. | Pos. | Nation | Player |
|---|---|---|---|
| 10 | MF | BRA | Patrik (loan return to (Brazil) Palmeiras) |
| 22 | MF | KOR | Denis Laktionov (free agent) |
| 28 | DF | KOR | Im Dong-Seon (free agent) |
| 30 | DF | KOR | Jeon Hun (free agent) |
| 33 | DF | KOR | Park Han-Bin (free agent) |
| 34 | DF | KOR | Kang Kyung-Mook (free agent) |
| 35 | DF | KOR | Lee Seung-Hyun (free agent) |
| 39 | MF | KOR | Park Ji-Hoon (free agent) |
| 43 | FW | KOR | Park Dong-Shin (free agent) |

== Coaching staff ==
| Position | Staff |
|---|---|
| Manager | (South Korea) Kim Yong-Kab |
| Assistant Manager | (South Korea) Kim Hyung-Yeol |
| Coach | (South Korea) Kim Do-Hoon |
| Coach | (South Korea) Lee Eul-Yong |
| GK Coach | (South Korea) Kim Tae-Su |
| Scouter | (South Korea) Shin Dong-Chul |
| Tactic Analyst | (South Korea) Kim Dong-Soo |

Last updated: 14 August 2013
Source: Gangwon FC

== Match results ==
=== K League Classic ===
==== Regular season ====
All times are Korea Standard Time (KST) – UTC+9

| Date Round | Home | Score | Away | Location |

| 3 March 1 | Busan | 2 – 2 | Gangwon | Yeonje-gu, Busan |
| 14:00 | Lim Sang-Hyub 2'; Park Jong-Woo 46' (pen.) | Report | Chun Jae-Ho (red card) 30'; Zicu 51' (pen.); Bae Hyo-Sung 69' (Assist by No.83) | Stadium: Busan Asiad Stadium; Attendance: 9,711; Referee: Lee Dong-Jun |

| 9 March 2 | Suwon | 1 – 0 | Gangwon | Suwon, Gyeonggi |
| 14:00 | Kim Do-Heon 11' | Report | | Stadium: Suwon World Cup Stadium; Attendance: 17,335; Referee: Kim Sang-Woo |

| 16 March 3 | Gangwon | 0 – 0 | Daegu | Gangneung, Gangwon |
| 14:00 | | Report | | Stadium: Gangneung Stadium; Attendance: 4,595; Referee: Lee Min-Hu |

| 31 March 4 | Ulsan | 3 – 0 | Gangwon | Nam-gu, Ulsan |
| 14:00 | Kim Shin-Wook 16'; Kim Seung-Yong 33'; Park Yong-Ji 84' | Report | | Stadium: Ulsan Munsu Football Stadium; Attendance: 11,953; Referee: Kim Sung-Ho |

| 7 April 5 | Gangwon | 1 – 1 | Chunnam | Chuncheon, Gangwon |
| 16:00 | Bae Hyo-Sung 51' (Assist by No.10) | Report | Lee Jong-Ho 80' | Stadium: Chuncheon Stadium; Attendance: 1,682; Referee: Ryu Hee-Sun |

| 13 April 6 | Jeju | 4 – 0 | Gangwon | Seogwipo, Jeju |
| 15:00 | Heo Jae-Won 30'; Pedro Júnior 59', 61'; Bae Il-Hwan 69' | Report | | Stadium: Jeju World Cup Stadium; Attendance: 4,773; Referee: Woo Sang-Il |

| 16 April 7 | Gangwon | 0 – 3 | Pohang | Gangneung, Gangwon |
| 19:00 | Jeon Jae-Ho (yellow card) 32' | Summary | Ko Mu-Yeol 18'; Hwang Jin-Sung (yellow card) 65'; Park Sung-Ho 74'; Moon Chang-Jin 90+1' | Stadium: Gangneung Stadium; Attendance: 1,831; Referee: Lee Dong-Jun |

| 21 April 8 | Gyeongnam | 1 – 1 | Gangwon | Changwon, Gyeongnam |
| 14:00 | Bubalo 64' (pen.) | Summary | Kim Oh-Gyu (yellow card) 16'; Bae Hyo-Sung (yellow card) 64'; Zicu 70' (pen.) | Stadium: Changwon Football Center; Attendance: 9,346; Referee: Jong-Hyeok Kim |

| 28 April 9 | Seoul | 3 – 2 | Gangwon | Mapo-gu, Seoul |
| 16:00 | Adilson (yellow card) 58'; Koh Myong-Jin (yellow card) 67'; Ko Yo-Han 79', 85'; Damjanović 87' (yellow card) 88'; Molina (yellow card) 90' | Summary | Patrik 8' (yellow card) 65'; Adilson 39' (o.g.); Namgung Woong (yellow card) 90' | Stadium: Seoul World Cup Stadium; Attendance: 17,085; Referee: (South Korea) Kim Sang-Woo |

| 5 May 10 | Gangwon | 1 – 1 | Daejeon | Gangneung, Gangwon |
| 14:00 | Wesley 9'; Bae Hyo-Sung (yellow card) 36'; Park Min (yellow card) 70' | Summary | Lee Dong-Hyun (yellow card) 66'; João Paulo 86' | Stadium: Gangneung Stadium; Attendance: 4,017; Referee: (South Korea) Song Min-Seok |

| 12 May 11 | Gangwon | 2 – 1 | Seongnam | Gangneung, Gangwon |
| 14:00 | Namgung Woong (yellow card) 32'; Jeon Jae-Ho (yellow card) 36'; Zicu 44' (pen.); Wesley 57'; Kim Oh-Gyu (yellow card) 66' | Summary | Kim Han-Yoon (yellow card) 2'; Kim Tae-Hwan 31'; Park Jin-Po (yellow card) 42'; Edcarlos (yellow card) 79' | Stadium: Gangneung Stadium; Attendance: 2,017; Referee: (South Korea) Kim Wan-Tae |

| 19 May 12 | Incheon | 1 – 0 | Gangwon | Jung-gu, Incheon |
| 14:00 | An Jae-Jun 41'; Kim Jae-Woong (yellow card) 52'; Kim Nam-Il (yellow card) 56' | Summary | Lee Jun-Yeob (yellow card) 48'; Kim Jin-Hwan (yellow card) 81' | Stadium: Incheon Football Stadium; Attendance: 7,758; Referee: (South Korea) Kim Sung-Ho |

| 26 May 13 | Gangwon | 1 – 3 | Jeonbuk | Chuncheon, Gangwon |
| 14:00 | Zicu 62' | Summary | Jung In-Whan 19', 54'; Lee Dong-Gook 37' | Stadium: Chuncheon Stadium; Attendance: 2,077; Referee: (South Korea) Choi Myung-Yong |

| 23 June 14 | Chunnam | 0 – 0 | Gangwon | Gwangyang, Jeonnam |
| 20:00 | Lim Jong-Eun (yellow card) 40'; Wesley Smith (yellow card) 88' | Summary | Wesley Barbosa (yellow card) 65'; Park Min (yellow card) 81' | Stadium: Gwangyang Football Stadium; Attendance: 1,471; Referee: (South Korea) Kim Jong-Hyeok |

| 30 June 15 | Gangwon | 2 – 1 | Suwon | Gangneung, Gangwon |
| 17:00 | Zicu 31' (pen.); Park Min 63'; Lee Chang-Yong (yellow card) 29' (yellow-red card) 70' | Summary | Ristic 74' | Stadium: Gangneung Stadium; Attendance: 4,683; Referee: Yoo Seon-Ho |

| 3 July 16 | Gangwon | 2 – 2 | Busan | Gangneung, Gangwon |
| 19:00 | Bae Hyo-Sung 48'; Zicu 58' | Summary | Fágner 33', 74' | Stadium: Gangneung Stadium; Attendance: 2,459; Referee: Ryu Hee-Sun |

| 6 July 17 | Daegu | 0 – 0 | Gangwon | Suseong-gu, Daegu |
| 17:00 | | Summary | Kim Oh-Gyu (yellow card) 32'; Jin Kyung-Sun (yellow card) 74' | Stadium: Daegu Stadium; Attendance: 6,607; Referee: (South Korea) Kim Sang-Woo |

| 13 July 18 | Gangwon | 1 – 1 | Gyeongnam | Gangneung, Gangwon |
| 17:00 | Bae Hyo-Sung 69' | Summary | Kang Jong-Guk (yellow card) 4'; Bosančić 86' | Stadium: Gangneung Stadium; Attendance: 3,112; Referee: (South Korea) Lee Min-Hu |

| 16 July 19 | Gangwon | 0 – 1 | Seoul | Gangneung, Gangwon |
| 19:00 | Kim Dong-Ki (yellow card) 19' | Summary | Kim Jin-Kyu 59' | Stadium: Gangneung Stadium; Attendance: 3,878; Referee: (South Korea) Song Min-Seok |

| 31 July 20 | Pohang | 4 – 0 | Gangwon | Pohang, Gyeongbuk |
| 19:30 | Park Sung-Ho 22'; Cho Chan-Ho 26', 53', 78'; Shin Jin-Ho (yellow card) 83' | Summary | Park Sang-Jin (yellow card) 61'; Kim Dong-Ki (yellow card) 75'; Bae Hyo-Sung (red card) 82' | Stadium: Pohang Steel Yard; Attendance: 13,176; Referee: (South Korea) Ko Hyung-Jin |

| 4 August 21 | Jeonbuk | 4 – 1 | Gangwon | Jeonju, Jeonbuk |
| 19:00 | Oris 22'; Park Hee-Do (yellow card) 28'; Kim Kee-Hee (yellow card) 37'; Jung In-Whan 82'; Song Je-Heon 84'; Lee Seung-Gi 89' | Summary | Kim Jin-Hwan (yellow card) 6'; Choi Jin-Ho 19' | Stadium: Jeonju World Cup Stadium; Attendance: 8,386; Referee: (South Korea) Woo Sang-Il |

| 10 August 22 | Gangwon | 0 – 4 | Jeju | Gangneung, Gangwon |
| 19:00 | Lee Jun-Yeob (yellow card) 45'; Wesley (yellow card) 59'; Zicu (yellow card) 76' | Summary | Pedro Júnior 20'; Bae Il-Hwan 42'; Lee Jin-Ho (yellow card) 45'; Song Jin-Hyung 79', 86' | Stadium: Gangneung Stadium; Attendance: 2,816; Referee: (South Korea) Kim Sung-Ho |

| 18 August 23 | Gangwon | 1 – 2 | Incheon | Gangneung, Gangwon |
| 19:00 | Kang Jung-Hun (yellow card) 6'; Kim Dong-Ki (yellow card) 34' (goal) 65'; Wesley (yellow card) 47'; Choi Woo-Jae (yellow card) 77' | Summary | Diogo da Silva Farias 80' (pen.); Nam Joon-Jae 90' | Stadium: Gangneung Stadium; Attendance: 2,315; Referee: (South Korea) Kim Sang-Woo |

| 24 August 24 | Daejeon | 2 – 0 | Gangwon | Yuseong-gu, Daejeon |
| 19:00 | Kim Byung-Suk 8' (yellow card) 59'; Arias (yellow card) 45' (goal) 86' | Summary | Jeon Jae-Ho (yellow card) 68'; Park Ho-Jin (yellow card) 80' | Stadium: Daejeon World Cup Stadium; Attendance: 4,055; Referee: (South Korea) Choi Myung-Yong |

| 28 August 25 | Seongnam | 2 – 0 | Gangwon | Seongnam, Gyeonggi |
| 19:30 | Vuković 68'; Hyun Young-Min (yellow card) 84'; Kim Dong-Sub (yellow card) 86' (goal) 89' | Summary | Lee Jun-Yeob (yellow card) 14'; Kim Dong-Ki (yellow card) 30'; Zicu (yellow card) 90' | Stadium: Tancheon Sports Complex; Attendance: 1,183; Referee: (South Korea) Yoo Sun-Ho |

| 1 September 26 | Gangwon | 1 – 2 | Ulsan | Gangneung, Gangwon |
| 19:00 | Kim Dong-Ki (yellow card) 28'; Choi Jin-Ho 41'; Lee Woo-Hyeok (yellow card) 82'; Kim Bong-Jin (yellow card) 90' | Summary | Caíque 18'; Choi Woo-Jae 39' (o.g.) | Stadium: Gangneung Stadium; Attendance: 1,875; Referee: (South Korea) Kim Hee-Gon |

| 11 September 27 | Daegu | 1 – 1 | Gangwon | Suseong-gu, Daegu |
| 19:00 | Choi Ho-Jeong 54' | | Choi Jin-Ho 50' | Stadium: Daegu Stadium; Attendance: 1,060; Referee: (South Korea) Kim Sung-Ho |

| 21 September 28 | Gangwon | 0 – 2 | Seongnam | Gangneung, Gangwon |
| 17:00 | | | Lim Chae-Min 8'; Kim Tae-Hwan 27' | Stadium: Gangneung Stadium; Attendance: 2,158; Referee: (South Korea) Lee Min-Hu |

| 28 September 29 | Daejeon | 1 – 3 | Gangwon | Yuseong-gu, Daejeon |
| 16:00 | Lee Dong-Hyun 31' | | Kim Bong-Jin 39'; Jeon Jae-Ho 49', 53' | Stadium: Daejeon World Cup Stadium; Attendance: 1,756; Referee: Yoo Sun-Ho |

| 5 October 30 | Gangwon | 2 – 1 | Gyeongnam | Wonju, Gangwon |
| 14:00 | Kim Bong-Jin 26' (yellow card) 89'; Kim Dong-Ki 34' (yellow card) 44' | Summary | Park Ju-Sung (yellow card) 23'; Jung Da-Hwon (yellow card) 45'; Yoon Sin-Young 67' | Stadium: Wonju Stadium; Attendance: 10,456; Referee: (South Korea) Hee-Sun Ryu |

| 9 October 31 | Jeju | 1 – 1 | Gangwon | Seogwipo, Jeju |
| 14:00 | Maranhão (yellow card) 73' (goal) 90'; Seo Dong-Hyeon (yellow card) 89' | Summary | Choi Woo-Jae (yellow card) 3'; Lee Yong 69' (o.g.) | Stadium: Jeju World Cup Stadium; Attendance: 2,870; Referee: (South Korea) Myung-Yong Choi |

| 27 October 32 | Gangwon | 2 – 1 | Chunnam | Chuncheon, Gangwon |
| 14:00 | Jin Kyung-Sun (yellow card) 17' (yellow-red card); Namgung Woong (yellow card) 30'; Lee Woo-Hyeok 30'; Lee Jun-Yeob 44' (pen.) | Summary | Lee Seung-Hee (yellow card) 41'; Shim Dong-Woon (yellow card) 51'; Kim Dong-Chul (yellow card) 64'; Lee Jong-Ho 68' | Stadium: Chuncheon Stadium; Attendance: 1,131; Referee: (South Korea) Min-Seok Song |

| 30 October 33 | Seongnam | 1 – 2 | Gangwon | Seongnam, Gyeonggi |
| 19:30 | Park Jin-Po 54' | Summary | Kim Young-Hoo 28'; Choi Jin-Ho 86' | Stadium: Tancheon Sports Complex; Attendance: 1,081; Referee: Kim Seong-Ho |

| 9 November 34 | Gangwon | 1 – 3 | Daejeon | Gangneung, Gangwon |
| 14:00 | Choi Jin-Ho 37' | Summary | Arias 14' (pen.), 62' (pen.); Hwang Ji-Woong 74' | Stadium: Gangneung Stadium; Attendance: 2,327; Referee: Choi Myung-Yong |

| 16 November 35 | Gyeongnam | 1 – 2 | Gangwon | Jinju, Gyeongnam |
| 14:00 | Kim Hyeung-Bum 61' | Summary | Choi Jin-Ho 30'; Jin Kyung-Sun 55' | Stadium: Jinju Stadium; Attendance: 2,574; Referee: Yoo Seon-Ho |

| 24 November 36 | Chunnam | 1 – 0 | Gangwon | Gwangyang, Jeonnam |
| 15:00 | Lim Jong-Eun 43' | Summary | | Stadium: Gwangyang Football Stadium; Attendance: 1,044; Referee: Ryu Hee-Sun |

| 27 November 37 | Gangwon | 2 – 2 | Daegu | Gangneung, Gangwon |
| 19:00 | Choi Seung-In 85', 90' | Summary | Leandrinho 32'; Hwang Il-Su 50' | Stadium: Gangneung Stadium; Attendance: 896; Referee: Woo Sang-Il |

| 30 November 38 | Gangwon | 3 – 0 | Jeju | Gangneung, Gangwon |
| 14:00 | Kim Dong-Ki 35', 46', 49' | Summary | | Stadium: Gangneung Stadium; Attendance: 2,263; Referee: Lee Min-Hoo |

==== League table ====
| Pos | Team | Pld | W | D | L | GF | GA | GD | Pts | Qualification or relegation |
|---|---|---|---|---|---|---|---|---|---|---|
| 10 | Jeonnam Dragons | 38 | 9 | 13 | 16 | 34 | 45 | −11 | 40 | |
| 11 | Gyeongnam FC | 38 | 8 | 13 | 17 | 42 | 55 | −13 | 37 | |
| 12 | Gangwon FC (R) | 38 | 8 | 12 | 18 | 37 | 64 | −27 | 36 | Qualification for relegation play-offs |
| 13 | Daegu FC (R) | 38 | 6 | 14 | 18 | 38 | 57 | −19 | 32 | Relegation to K League Challenge |
| 14 | Daejeon Citizen (R) | 38 | 7 | 11 | 20 | 37 | 68 | −31 | 32 | Relegation to K League Challenge |

Source: K League
Rules for classification: 1) Points; 2) Goal difference; 3) Goals scored
(R) Relegated

==== Results summary ====
| Overall | | | | | | | | Home | | | | | | Away | | | | | |
| Pld | W | D | L | GF | GA | GD | Pts | W | D | L | GF | GA | GD | W | D | L | GF | GA | GD |
|---|---|---|---|---|---|---|---|---|---|---|---|---|---|---|---|---|---|---|---|
| 38 | 8 | 12 | 18 | 37 | 64 | −27 | 36 | 5 | 6 | 8 | 22 | 31 | −9 | 3 | 6 | 10 | 15 | 33 | −18 |

==== Results by round ====
| Round | 1 | 2 | 3 | 4 | 5 | 6 | 7 | 8 | 9 | 10 | 11 | 12 | 13 | 14 | 15 | 16 | 17 | 18 | 19 | 20 | 21 | 22 | 23 | 24 | 25 | 26 | 27 | 28 | 29 | 30 | 31 | 32 | 33 | 34 | 35 | 36 | 37 | 38 |
|---|---|---|---|---|---|---|---|---|---|---|---|---|---|---|---|---|---|---|---|---|---|---|---|---|---|---|---|---|---|---|---|---|---|---|---|---|---|---|
| Ground | A | A | H | A | H | A | H | A | A | H | H | A | H | A | H | H | A | H | H | A | A | H | H | A | A | H | A | H | A | H | A | H | A | H | A | A | H | H |
| Result | D | L | D | L | D | L | L | D | L | D | W | L | L | D | W | D | D | D | L | L | L | L | L | L | L | L | D | L | W | W | D | W | W | L | W | L | D | W |
| Position | 5 | 9 | 9 | 13 | 12 | 13 | 13 | 13 | 12 | 12 | 12 | 12 | 12 | 12 | 12 | 12 | 13 | 13 | 13 | 13 | 13 | 13 | 13 | 13 | 13 | 13 | 13 | 13 | 13 | 13 | 13 | 13 | 13 | 12 | 12 | 12 | 12 | 12 |

Updated to match(es) played on 1 December 2013. Source: League Fixtures and Results
A = Away; H = Home; W = Win; D = Draw; L = Loss

==== Relegation/Promotion Playoff ====
| 4 December Playoff 1st leg | Sangju | 4 – 1 | Gangwon | Sangju, Gyeongbuk |
| 19:00 | Lee Sang-Hyup 29', 89'; Lee Seung-Hyun 71'; Lee Sang-ho 77' | Summary | Choi Seung-In 90+2' | Stadium: Sangju Civic Stadium; Attendance: 7,448 |

| 7 December Playoff 2nd leg | Gangwon | 1 – 0 | Sangju | Gangneung, Gangwon |
| 14:00 | Choi Seung-In 71' | Summary | | Stadium: Gangneung Stadium; Attendance: 3,062 |

Gangwon FC lost 2–4 on aggregate and relegated 2014 K League Challenge.

=== Korean FA Cup ===
| 8 May 2013 Last 32 | Gangwon FC | 3 - 2 (a.e.t.) | Gyeongju KHNP | Gangneung, Gangwon |
| 20:00 | Zicu 13', 91'; Lee Jun-Yeob 35' | Summary | Jo Joo-Young 26'; Hwnag Hoon-Hee 67' | Stadium: Gangneung Stadium; Attendance: 918; Referee: Kim Young-Woo |

| 10 July 2013 Last 16 | Busan IPark | 2 - 1 | Gangwon FC | Yeonje-gu, Busan |
| 19:30 | Fágner 20'; Bang Seung-Hwan 76' | Summary | Kim Dong-Ki 41' | Stadium: Busan Asiad Main Stadium |

== Squad statistics ==
=== Appearances ===
Statistics accurate as of match played 7 December 2013

| No. | Nat. | Pos. | Name | League | | Playoff | | FA Cup | | Appearances | | Goals |
| No. | Nat. | Pos. | Name | Apps | Goals | Apps | Goals | Apps | Goals | App (sub) | Total | Goals |
|---|---|---|---|---|---|---|---|---|---|---|---|---|
| 1 | (South Korea) | GK | Park Ho-Jin | 15 | 0 | 0 | 0 | 0 | 0 | 15 (0) | 15 | 0 |
| 2 | (South Korea) | DF | Choi Woo-Jae | 15 (1) | 0 | 1 | 0 | 1 (1) | 0 | 17 (2) | 19 | 0 |
| 4 | (South Korea) | DF | Park Min | 9 (11) | 1 | 0 | 0 | 0 (1) | 0 | 9 (12) | 21 | 1 |
| 5 | (South Korea) | DF | Bae Hyo-Sung | 34 | 4 | 2 | 0 | 1 | 0 | 37 (0) | 37 | 4 |
| 6 | (South Korea) | MF | Jin Kyung-Sun | 34 (1) | 1 | 2 | 0 | 1 | 0 | 37 (1) | 38 | 1 |
| 7 | (South Korea) | FW | Kang Jung-Hun | 7 (6) | 0 | 0 | 0 | 0 | 0 | 7 (6) | 13 | 0 |
| 8 | (South Korea) | DF | Jeon Jae-Ho | 25 (1) | 2 | 1 | 0 | 1 | 0 | 27 (1) | 28 | 2 |
| 9 | (Brazil) | FW | Wesley | 28 (4) | 2 | 0 | 0 | 1 | 0 | 29 (4) | 33 | 2 |
| 10 | (South Korea) | FW | Kim Young-Hoo | 2 (3) | 1 | 1 | 0 | 0 | 0 | 3 (3) | 6 | 1 |
| 11 | (South Korea) | FW | Kim Jin-Yong | 4 (3) | 0 | 0 | 0 | 2 | 0 | 6 (3) | 9 | 0 |
| 12 | (South Korea) | FW | Choi Seung-In | 1 (9) | 2 | 1 (1) | 2 | 0 | 0 | 2 (10) | 12 | 4 |
| 13 | (South Korea) | DF | Park Sang-Jin | 14 (4) | 0 | 1 | 0 | 0 | 0 | 15 (4) | 19 | 0 |
| 14 | (South Korea) | DF | Kim Jin-Hwan | 9 (3) | 0 | 0 | 0 | 1 | 0 | 10 (3) | 13 | 0 |
| 15 | (South Korea) | DF | Namgung Woong | 20 (1) | 0 | 1 | 0 | 2 | 0 | 23 (1) | 24 | 0 |
| 16 | (South Korea) | FW | Lee Jun-Yeob | 23 (4) | 1 | 0 | 0 | 1 | 1 | 24 (4) | 28 | 2 |
| 17 | (South Korea) | MF | Moon Byung-Woo | 0 (9) | 0 | 0 | 0 | 1 | 0 | 1 (9) | 10 | 0 |
| 19 | (South Korea) | FW | Kim Dong-Ki | 16 (6) | 5 | 1 | 0 | 1 (1) | 1 | 18 (7) | 25 | 6 |
| 20 | (South Korea) | MF | Kim Oh-Gyu | 33 (1) | 0 | 2 | 0 | 1 | 0 | 36 (1) | 37 | 0 |
| 21 | (South Korea) | GK | Kim Keun-Bae | 23 | 0 | 2 | 0 | 2 | 0 | 27 (0) | 27 | 0 |
| 22 | (South Korea) | FW | Choi Jin-Ho | 13 (9) | 6 | 2 | 0 | 0 | 0 | 15 (9) | 24 | 6 |
| 23 | (South Korea) | DF | Lee Jae-Hun | 4 (3) | 0 | 1 | 0 | 0 | 0 | 5 (3) | 8 | 0 |
| 24 | (South Korea) | MF | Lee Woo-Hyeok | 7 (5) | 1 | 1 | 0 | 1 | 0 | 9 (5) | 14 | 1 |
| 25 | (South Korea) | DF | Lee Chang-Yong | 13 (2) | 0 | 0 | 0 | 0 | 0 | 13 (2) | 15 | 0 |
| 26 | (South Korea) | MF | Kim Hyo-Jin | 0 (1) | 0 | 0 | 0 | 1 | 0 | 1 (1) | 2 | 0 |
| 27 | (South Korea) | MF | Kim Bong-Jin | 12 | 2 | 1 | 0 | 1 | 0 | 14 (0) | 14 | 2 |
| 29 | (South Korea) | MF | Lee Jong-Chan | 3 (3) | 0 | 0 | 0 | 1 | 0 | 4 (3) | 7 | 0 |
| 31 | (South Korea) | FW | Kim Yun-Ho | 3 (1) | 0 | 1 | 0 | 1 | 0 | 5 (1) | 6 | 0 |
| 32 | (South Korea) | FW | You Jae-Won | 0 (2) | 0 | 0 | 0 | 0 (1) | 0 | 0 (3) | 3 | 0 |
| 36 | (South Korea) | DF | Kim Young-Yun | 0 | 0 | 0 | 0 | 0 | 0 | 0 | 0 | 0 |
| 37 | (South Korea) | DF | Ko Gi-Hun | 0 | 0 | 0 | 0 | 0 | 0 | 0 | 0 | 0 |
| 38 | (South Korea) | DF | Park Moon-Ho | 0 | 0 | 0 | 0 | 0 | 0 | 0 | 0 | 0 |
| 40 | (South Korea) | MF | Lee Bong-Jun | 0 | 0 | 0 | 0 | 0 (1) | 0 | 0 (1) | 1 | 0 |
| 41 | (South Korea) | GK | Lee Keun-Pyo | 0 | 0 | 0 | 0 | 0 | 0 | 0 | 0 | 0 |
| 42 | (South Korea) | DF | Kim Dae-San | 0 | 0 | 0 | 0 | 0 | 0 | 0 | 0 | 0 |
| 44 | (South Korea) | DF | Kim Dong-Ho | 0 | 0 | 0 | 0 | 0 | 0 | 0 | 0 | 0 |
| 45 | (South Korea) | MF | Lee Jong-In | 6 (4) | 0 | 0 | 0 | 0 (2) | 0 | 6 (6) | 12 | 0 |
| 83 | (Romania) | FW | Ianis Zicu | 25 (2) | 6 | 1 (1) | 0 | 1 | 2 | 27 (3) | 30 | 8 |
| 3 | (Australia) | DF | Brendan Hamill (out) | 0 | 0 | 0 | 0 | 0 | 0 | 0 | 0 | 0 |
| 7 | (South Korea) | FW | Han Dong-Won (loan out) | 3 (5) | 0 | 0 | 0 | 0 | 0 | 3 (5) | 8 | 0 |
| 10 | (Brazil) | MF | Patrik (out) | 9 (2) | 1 | 0 | 0 | 0 | 0 | 9 (2) | 11 | 1 |
| 18 | (South Korea) | FW | Kim Eun-Jung (loan out) | 8 (5) | 0 | 0 | 0 | 0 | 0 | 8 (5) | 13 | 0 |
| 22 | (South Korea) | MF | Denis Laktionov (out) | 0 (1) | 0 | 0 | 0 | 0 | 0 | 0 (1) | 1 | 0 |
| 28 | (South Korea) | DF | Im Dong-Seon (out) | 0 | 0 | 0 | 0 | 0 | 0 | 0 | 0 | 0 |
| 30 | (South Korea) | DF | Jeon Hun (out) | 0 | 0 | 0 | 0 | 0 | 0 | 0 | 0 | 0 |
| 33 | (South Korea) | DF | Park Han-Bin (out) | 0 | 0 | 0 | 0 | 0 | 0 | 0 | 0 | 0 |
| 34 | (South Korea) | DF | Kang Kyung-Mook (out) | 0 | 0 | 0 | 0 | 0 | 0 | 0 | 0 | 0 |
| 35 | (South Korea) | DF | Lee Seung-Hyun (out) | 0 | 0 | 0 | 0 | 0 | 0 | 0 | 0 | 0 |
| 39 | (South Korea) | MF | Park Ji-Hoon (out) | 0 | 0 | 0 | 0 | 0 | 0 | 0 | 0 | 0 |
| 43 | (South Korea) | FW | Park Dong-Shin (out) | 0 | 0 | 0 | 0 | 0 | 0 | 0 | 0 | 0 |

=== Goals and assists ===
| Rank | Nation | Number | Name | League | | Playoff | | KFA Cup | | Sum | | Total |
| Rank | Nation | Number | Name | Goals | Assists | Goals | Assists | Goals | Assists | Goals | Assists | Total |
|---|---|---|---|---|---|---|---|---|---|---|---|---|
| 1 | (Romania) | 83 | Ianis Zicu | 6 | 2 | 0 | 0 | 2 | 0 | 8 | 2 | 10 |
| = | (South Korea) | 19 | Kim Dong-Ki | 5 | 4 | 0 | 0 | 1 | 0 | 6 | 4 | 10 |
| 2 | (South Korea) | 22 | Choi Jin-Ho | 6 | 1 | 0 | 1 | 0 | 0 | 6 | 2 | 8 |
| 3 | (South Korea) | 8 | Jeon Jae-Ho | 2 | 3 | 0 | 0 | 0 | 1 | 2 | 4 | 6 |
| 4 | (South Korea) | 12 | Choi Seung-In | 2 | 1 | 2 | 0 | 0 | 0 | 4 | 1 | 5 |
| 5 | (South Korea) | 5 | Bae Hyo-Sung | 4 | 0 | 0 | 0 | 0 | 0 | 4 | 0 | 4 |
| = | (South Korea) | 16 | Lee Jun-Yeob | 1 | 1 | 0 | 0 | 1 | 1 | 2 | 2 | 4 |
| 6 | (Brazil) | 9 | Wesley | 2 | 1 | 0 | 0 | 0 | 0 | 2 | 1 | 3 |
| = | (South Korea) | 27 | Kim Bong-Jin | 2 | 1 | 0 | 0 | 0 | 0 | 2 | 1 | 3 |
| 7 | (South Korea) | 6 | Jin Kyung-Sun | 1 | 1 | 0 | 0 | 0 | 0 | 1 | 1 | 2 |
| = | (Brazil) | 10 | Patrik | 1 | 1 | 0 | 0 | 0 | 0 | 1 | 1 | 2 |
| = | (South Korea) | 24 | Lee Woo-Hyeok | 1 | 1 | 0 | 0 | 0 | 0 | 1 | 1 | 2 |
| = | (South Korea) | 15 | Namgung Woong | 0 | 2 | 0 | 0 | 0 | 0 | 0 | 2 | 2 |
| 8 | (South Korea) | 4 | Park Min | 1 | 0 | 0 | 0 | 0 | 0 | 1 | 0 | 1 |
| = | (South Korea) | 10 | Kim Young-Hoo | 1 | 0 | 0 | 0 | 0 | 0 | 1 | 0 | 1 |
| = | (South Korea) | 7 | Kang Jung-Hun | 0 | 1 | 0 | 0 | 0 | 0 | 0 | 1 | 1 |
| = | (South Korea) | 13 | Park Sang-Jin | 0 | 1 | 0 | 0 | 0 | 0 | 0 | 1 | 1 |
| = | (South Korea) | 17 | Moon Byung-Woo | 0 | 1 | 0 | 0 | 0 | 0 | 0 | 1 | 1 |
| = | (South Korea) | 18 | Kim Eun-Jung | 0 | 1 | 0 | 0 | 0 | 0 | 0 | 1 | 1 |
| = | (South Korea) | 20 | Kim Oh-Gyu | 0 | 0 | 0 | 1 | 0 | 0 | 0 | 1 | 1 |
| = | (South Korea) | 2 | Choi Woo-Jae | 0 | 0 | 0 | 0 | 0 | 1 | 0 | 1 | 1 |
| / | / | / | Own Goals | 2 | - | 0 | - | 0 | - | 2 | - | 2 |
| / | / | / | TOTALS | 37 | 23 | 2 | 2 | 4 | 3 | 43 | 28 | |

=== Discipline ===
| Position | Nation | Number | Name | League | | Playoff | | KFA Cup | | Total | |
| Position | Nation | Number | Name | Yellow card | Red card | Yellow card | Red card | Yellow card | Red card | Yellow card | Red card |
| GK | (South Korea) | 1 | Park Ho-Jin | 1 | 0 | 0 | 0 | 0 | 0 | 1 | 0 |
| DF | (South Korea) | 2 | Choi Woo-Jae | 6 | 0 | 0 | 0 | 0 | 0 | 6 | 0 |
| DF | (South Korea) | 4 | Park Min | 2 | 0 | 0 | 0 | 0 | 0 | 2 | 0 |
| DF | (South Korea) | 5 | Bae Hyo-Sung | 5 | 1 | 2 | 0 | 0 | 0 | 7 | 1 |
| MF | (South Korea) | 6 | Jin Kyung-Sun | 7 | 1 | 0 | 0 | 0 | 0 | 7 | 1 |
| FW | (South Korea) | 7 | Kang Jung-Hun | 2 | 0 | 0 | 0 | 0 | 0 | 2 | 0 |
| DF | (South Korea) | 8 | Jeon Jae-Ho | 6 | 1 | 0 | 0 | 0 | 0 | 6 | 1 |
| FW | (Brazil) | 9 | Wesley | 8 | 0 | 0 | 0 | 1 | 0 | 9 | 0 |
| MF | (Brazil) | 10 | Patrik | 2 | 0 | 0 | 0 | 0 | 0 | 2 | 0 |
| FW | (South Korea) | 11 | Kim Jin-Yong | 0 | 0 | 0 | 0 | 1 | 0 | 1 | 0 |
| FW | (South Korea) | 12 | Choi Seung-In | 1 | 0 | 0 | 0 | 0 | 0 | 1 | 0 |
| DF | (South Korea) | 13 | Park Sang-Jin | 2 | 0 | 0 | 0 | 0 | 0 | 2 | 0 |
| DF | (South Korea) | 14 | Kim Jin-Hwan | 3 | 0 | 0 | 0 | 1 | 0 | 4 | 0 |
| DF | (South Korea) | 15 | Namgung Woong | 3 | 0 | 0 | 0 | 2 | 0 | 5 | 0 |
| FW | (South Korea) | 16 | Lee Jun-Yeob | 4 | 0 | 0 | 0 | 0 | 0 | 4 | 0 |
| MF | (South Korea) | 17 | Moon Byung-Woo | 1 | 0 | 0 | 0 | 0 | 0 | 1 | 0 |
| FW | (South Korea) | 19 | Kim Dong-Ki | 9 | 0 | 0 | 0 | 0 | 0 | 9 | 0 |
| DF | (South Korea) | 20 | Kim Oh-Gyu | 8 | 0 | 2 | 1 | 0 | 0 | 10 | 1 |
| FW | (South Korea) | 22 | Choi Jin-Ho | 3 | 0 | 0 | 0 | 0 | 0 | 3 | 0 |
| DF | (South Korea) | 23 | Lee Jae-Hun | 1 | 0 | 0 | 0 | 0 | 0 | 1 | 0 |
| MF | (South Korea) | 24 | Lee Woo-Hyeok | 3 | 0 | 0 | 0 | 0 | 0 | 3 | 0 |
| DF | (South Korea) | 25 | Lee Chang-Yong | 6 | 1 | 0 | 0 | 0 | 0 | 6 | 1 |
| MF | (South Korea) | 27 | Kim Bong-Jin | 3 | 0 | 0 | 0 | 0 | 0 | 3 | 0 |
| FW | (Romania) | 83 | Ianis Zicu | 3 | 0 | 0 | 0 | 0 | 0 | 3 | 0 |
| / | / | / | TOTALS | 89 | 4 | 4 | 1 | 5 | 0 | 98 | 5 |
