= 2015 King's Cup squads =

The 2015 King's Cup is an international football tournament that will be held in Thailand from 1 to 7 February 2015. The 4 national teams involved in the tournament are required to register a squad of 23 players, including three goalkeepers. Only players in these squads are eligible to take part in the tournament.

== Stage ==
=== Thailand ===
Coach: Kiatisak Senamuang

No.	Pos.	Player	Date of birth (age)	Caps	Goals	Club
1	GK	Kawin Thamsatchanan ^{(vice-captain)}	26 January 1990 (aged 25)	36	0	(Thailand) Muangthong United
20	GK	Chanin Sae-Eae	5 July 1992 (aged 22)	1	0	(Thailand) Chainat Hornbill
2	DF	Peerapat Notchaiya	4 February 1993 (aged 21)	9	0	(Thailand) BEC Tero Sasana
5	DF	Suttinan Phuk-hom	29 November 1987 (aged 27)	23	2	(Thailand) Chonburi
8	DF	Artit Daosawang	11 November 1992 (aged 22)	6	0	(Thailand) Muangthong United
13	DF	Narubadin Weerawatnodom	12 July 1994 (aged 20)	13	1	(Thailand) Buriram United
3	DF	Mika Chunuonsee	26 March 1989 (aged 25)	0	0	(Thailand) Bangkok United
17	DF	Tanaboon Kesarat	21 September 1993 (aged 21)	10	1	(Thailand) BEC Tero Sasana
4	MF	Kroekrit Thaweekarn	19 November 1990 (aged 24)	11	4	(Thailand) Chonburi
6	MF	Sarach Yooyen	30 May 1992 (aged 22)	11	0	(Thailand) Muangthong United
10	MF	Pokkhao Anan	4 March 1991 (aged 23)	5	1	(Thailand) Police United
7	MF	Thitipan Puangchan	1 September 1993 (aged 21)	6	2	(Thailand) Muangthong United
12	MF	Prakit Deeporm	7 January 1988 (aged 27)	9	2	(Thailand) Buriram United
14	MF	Kasidech Wettayawong	21 January 1994 (aged 21)	0	0	(Thailand) Muangthong United
15	MF	Nurul Sriyankem	8 February 1992 (aged 22)	2	0	(Thailand) Chonburi
18	MF	Chanathip Songkrasin	5 October 1993 (aged 21)	17	4	(Thailand) BEC Tero Sasana
19	MF	Adul Lahso (captain)	19 September 1986 (aged 28)	29	1	(Thailand) Chonburi
11	MF	Mongkol Tossakrai	5 September 1987 (aged 27)	10	3	(Thailand) Army United
9	FW	Adisak Kraisorn	1 February 1991 (aged 24)	8	6	(Thailand) BEC Tero Sasana
16	FW	Pinyo Inpinit	1 July 1993 (aged 21)	4	0	(Thailand) Police United

=== South Korea Olympic ===
Coach: Choi Moon-sik

No.	Pos.	Player	Date of birth (age)	Caps	Goals	Club
21	GK	Gu Sung-yun	27 June 1994 (aged 20)			(Japan) Consadole Sapporo
1	GK	Lee Chang-keun	30 August 1993 (aged 21)			(South Korea) Busan IPark
19	GK	Kim Dong-jun	19 December 1994 (aged 20)			(South Korea) Yonsei University
14	DF	Song Ju-hun	13 January 1994 (aged 21)			(Japan) Albirex Niigata
4	DF	Yeon Je-min (c)	24 May 1993 (aged 21)			(South Korea) Suwon Samsung Bluewings
5	DF	Woo Joo-sung	8 June 1993 (aged 21)			(South Korea) Gyeongnam FC
2	DF	Sim Sang-min	21 May 1993 (aged 21)			(South Korea) FC Seoul
12	DF	Lee Myung-jae	4 November 1993 (aged 21)			(South Korea) Ulsan Hyundai
3	DF	Park Dong-jin	10 December 1994 (aged 20)			(South Korea) Hannam University
13	DF	Lee Ji-min	4 September 1993 (aged 21)			(South Korea) Jeonnam Dragons
8	MF	Lee Chang-min	20 January 1994 (aged 21)			(South Korea) Gyeongnam FC
10	MF	Moon Chang-jin	12 July 1993 (aged 21)			(South Korea) Pohang Steelers
20	MF	Kang Sang-woo	7 October 1993 (aged 21)			(South Korea) Pohang Steelers
18	MF	Jung Jae-hyuk	4 December 1993 (aged 21)			(South Korea) Jeonnam Dragons
6	MF	Kim Sun-Woo	19 April 1993 (aged 21)			(South Korea) Jeju United FC
15	MF	Lee Woo-hyeok	24 February 1993 (aged 21)			(South Korea) Gangwon FC
16	MF	Lee Yeong-jae	13 September 1994 (aged 20)			(South Korea) Ulsan Hyundai
11	MF	Han Eui-kwon	30 June 1994 (aged 20)			(South Korea) Gyeongnam FC
7	MF	Kim Seung-jun	11 November 1994 (aged 20)			(South Korea) Ulsan Hyundai
17	FW	Kim Jin-hyuk	3 June 1993 (aged 21)			(South Korea) Daegu FC
9	FW	Kim Hyun	3 May 1993 (aged 21)			(South Korea) Jeju United

=== Uzbekistan U-23 ===
Coach: Shukhrat Maqsudov

=== Honduras U-20 ===
Coach: Jorge Jiménez

No.	Pos.	Player	Date of birth (age)	Caps	Club
1	GK	Edrick Menjivar	22 September 1996 (aged 18)		(Honduras) Valle FC
12	GK	Roberto López	23 April 1995 (aged 19)		(Honduras) Real España
5	DF	Dabirson Castillo	25 September 1996 (aged 18)		(Honduras) Platense
11	DF	Elder Torres	14 April 1995 (aged 19)		(Honduras) Vida
15	DF	Maylor Nuñez	7 May 1996 (aged 18)		(Honduras) Motagua
16	DF	Devron García	17 February 1996 (aged 18)		(Honduras) Victoria
6	DF	Carlos Moncada	4 September 1995 (aged 19)		(Honduras) Real España
4	DF	Luis Santos	3 May 1996 (aged 18)		(Honduras) Olimpia
3	DF	Jonathan Paz	18 June 1995 (aged 19)		(Honduras) C.D. Real Sociedad
2	DF	Kevin Alvarez	8 March 1996 (aged 18)		(Honduras) Olimpia
20	MF	Deybi Flores	16 June 1996 (aged 18)		(Honduras) Motagua
14	MF	John Suazo	10 July 1995 (aged 19)		(Honduras) Marathón
10	MF	José Alberto Escalante	25 May 1995 (aged 19)		(Honduras) Olimpia
8	MF	Rolin Alvarez	14 June 1995 (aged 19)		(Honduras) Parrillas One
18	MF	Kevin López	3 February 1996 (aged 18)		(Honduras) Motagua
13	MF	Jhow Benavidez	26 December 1995 (aged 19)		(Honduras) Real España
7	MF	Michaell Chirinos	17 June 1995 (aged 19)		(Honduras) Olimpia
9	FW	Bryan Róchez^{*}	1 January 1995 (aged 20)		(United States) Orlando City SC
17	FW	Alberth Elis	2 December 1996 (aged 18)		(Honduras) Olimpia
19	FW	Júnior Lacayo	19 August 1995 (aged 19)		(Mexico) Santos Laguna

^{*} recalled from club.
