= Lee Chang-min =

Lee Chang-min may refer to:

- Lee Chang-min (singer)
- Lee Chang-min (footballer)
