= Kim Hyo-jin (footballer) =

South Korean footballer

Personal information
- Date of birth: 22 October 1990 (age 36)
- Place of birth: South Korea
- Height: 1.77 m (5 ft 10 in)
- Position: Midfielder

Team information
- Current team: Paju Citizen

Senior career*
Years	Team	Apps	(Gls)
2013–2014	Gangwon	1	(0)
2014	Yangju Citizen		
2015–2017	Hwaseong		
2017	Chiangmai		
2018	Kasetsart		
2019–	Paju Citizen		
- * Club domestic league appearances and goals as of 14:18, 26 January 2019 (UTC)

- Kim Hyo-jin
- Hangul: 김효진
- RR: Gim Hyojin
- MR: Kim Hyojin

Kim Hyo-jin (Korean: 김효진; born 22 October 1990) is a South Korean footballer currently playing as a midfielder for Paju Citizen.

== Career statistics ==
=== Club ===
As of 26 January 2019.

Club	Season	League			Cup		Other		Total	
Club	Season	Division	Apps	Goals	Apps	Goals	Apps	Goals	Apps	Goals
Gangwon	2013	K League Classic	1	0	1 (Note: Appearances in the Korean FA Cup)	0	0	0	2	0
Gangwon	2014	K League Classic	0	0	0	0	0	0	0	0
Career total			1	0	1	0	0	0	2	0
