= Lee Jun-yeob =

South Korean footballer

Lee Jun-Yeob
Personal information
- Full name: Lee Jun-Yeob
- Date of birth: 21 May 1990 (age 36)
- Place of birth: South Korea
- Height: 1.83 m (6 ft 0 in)
- Position: Midfielder

Team information
- Current team: Gangneung City

Youth career
- 2009–2011: Myongji University

Senior career*
Years	Team	Apps	(Gls)
2011	Henan Jianye	12	(0)
2012	Incheon Korail	18	(1)
2013–	Gangwon FC	28	(1)
2014–	→ Gangneung City (loan)		
- * Club domestic league appearances and goals as of 1 July 2014

Lee Jun-Yeob (Korean: 이준엽; born 21 May 1990) is a South Korean footballer who plays as midfielder for Gangneung City in Korea National League.

== Career ==
He was selected by Gangwon FC in 2013 K League Classic Draft. He made his K-League debut match against Jeju on 3 November 2012.
