= Han Eui-kwon =

South Korean footballer (born 1994)

Personal information
- Full name: Han Eui-kwon
- Date of birth: 30 June 1994 (age 32)
- Place of birth: Gangneung, South Korea
- Height: 1.76 m (5 ft 9 1/2 in)
- Position: Forward

Team information
- Current team: Balzan
- Number: 17

Youth career
- 2013: Daejeon Citizen

Senior career*
Years	Team	Apps	(Gls)
2014–2015	Gyeongnam FC	21	(0)
2015–2018	Daejeon Citizen	24	(3)
2017–2018	→ Asan Mugunghwa (army)	34	(14)
2018–2020	Suwon Samsung Bluewings	57	(4)
2021	Seoul E-Land FC	28	(6)
2022–2023	Fagiano Okayama	38	(4)
2024–	Balzan	9	(0)

International career
2014–2015	South Korea U-23	3	(0)
- * Club domestic league appearances and goals as of 13 May 2024

Han Eui-kwon (Korean: 한의권; born 30 June 1994) is a South Korean professional footballer who plays as a forward for Maltese Premier League club Balzan.

== Club career ==
Han was selected by Gyeongnam FC in the 2014 K League Draft. He moved to Daejeon Citizen in July 2015.

In 2021, he moved to Seoul E-Land FC.

After the 2021 season, as the contract with Seoul E-Land FC was over, he joined Fagiano Okayama in the J2 League.

On 11 January 2024, Han joined Maltese Premier League club Balzan on a free transfer.

== Honours ==
=== International ===
South Korea U-23

- King's Cup: 2015
