= Chun Jae-ho =

South Korean footballer (born 1979)

Personal information
- Date of birth: August 8, 1979 (age 47)
- Place of birth: South Korea
- Height: 1.68 m (5 ft 6 in)
- Position: Midfielder

Youth career
- 1995–1997: Chungang University High School
- 1998–2001: Hongik University

Senior career*
Years	Team	Apps	(Gls)
2002–2003	Seongnam Ilhwa Chunma	31	(0)
2004–2011	Incheon United	162	(3)
2012	Busan IPark	3	(0)
2012–2013	Gangwon FC	40	(2)

Managerial career
- 2015–2016: U-18 Incheon United (assistant)
- 2017–2018: U-18 Incheon United
- 2019: Viettel (assistant)
- 2021–2022: Hanoi (assistant)
- 2022: Hanoi (interim)
Korean name
Hangul	전재호
Hanja	田在浩
RR	Jeon Jaeho
MR	Chŏn Chaeho
- * Club domestic league appearances and goals

Chun Jae-ho (Korean: 전재호; born August 8, 1979) is a South Korean football manager and former professional player who played as a midfielder. He is the interim manager of Hanoi FC of V.League 1 as of 2022.

== Club career statistics ==
Club performance			League		Cup		League Cup		Continental		Total	
Season	Club	League	Apps	Goals	Apps	Goals	Apps	Goals	Apps	Goals	Apps	Goals
South Korea			League		KFA Cup		League Cup		Asia		Total	
2002	Seongnam Ilhwa Chunma	K-League / K League Classic	0	0	?	?	3	0	?	?		
2003	Seongnam Ilhwa Chunma	K-League / K League Classic	31	0	2	0	-		?	?		
2004	Incheon United	K-League / K League Classic	20	1	1	0	10	0	-		31	1
2005	Incheon United	K-League / K League Classic	23	1	0	0	12	0	-		35	1
2006	Incheon United	K-League / K League Classic	12	0	2	0	2	0	-		16	0
2007	Incheon United	K-League / K League Classic	21	0	3	0	10	0	-		34	0
2008	Incheon United	K-League / K League Classic	22	0	1	0	2	1	-		25	1
2009	Incheon United	K-League / K League Classic	26	0	0	0	5	0	-		31	0
2010	Incheon United	K-League / K League Classic	22	0	2	0	4	0	-		28	0
2011	Incheon United	K-League / K League Classic	20	1	1	0	1	0	-		22	1
2012	Busan I'Park	K-League / K League Classic	3	0	0	0	-		-		3	0
2012	Gangwon FC	K-League / K League Classic	13	0	0	0	-		-		13	0
2013	Gangwon FC	K-League / K League Classic	27	2	1	0	-		-		28	2
Career total			240	5			49	1				

== Managerial statistics ==
As of match played 27 November 2022

Team	From	To	Record					
Team	From	To	G	W	D	L	Win %	Ref.
Hanoi FC (interim)	19 February 2022	8 December 2022	29	20	6	3	68.97	

== Honours ==
=== Manager ===
Hanoi FC

- V.League 1: 2022
- Vietnamese Cup: 2022

Individual

- V.League 1 Manager of the Month: August 2022

Sporting positions
Preceded by Lee Jun-young; Lim Joong-yong	Incheon United captain 2010	Succeeded by Bae Hyo-sung
Preceded by Kim Eun-jung	Gangwon FC captain 2013	Succeeded by Kim Oh-gyu
