= Lee Chang-yong =

South Korean footballer

Lee Chang-Yong
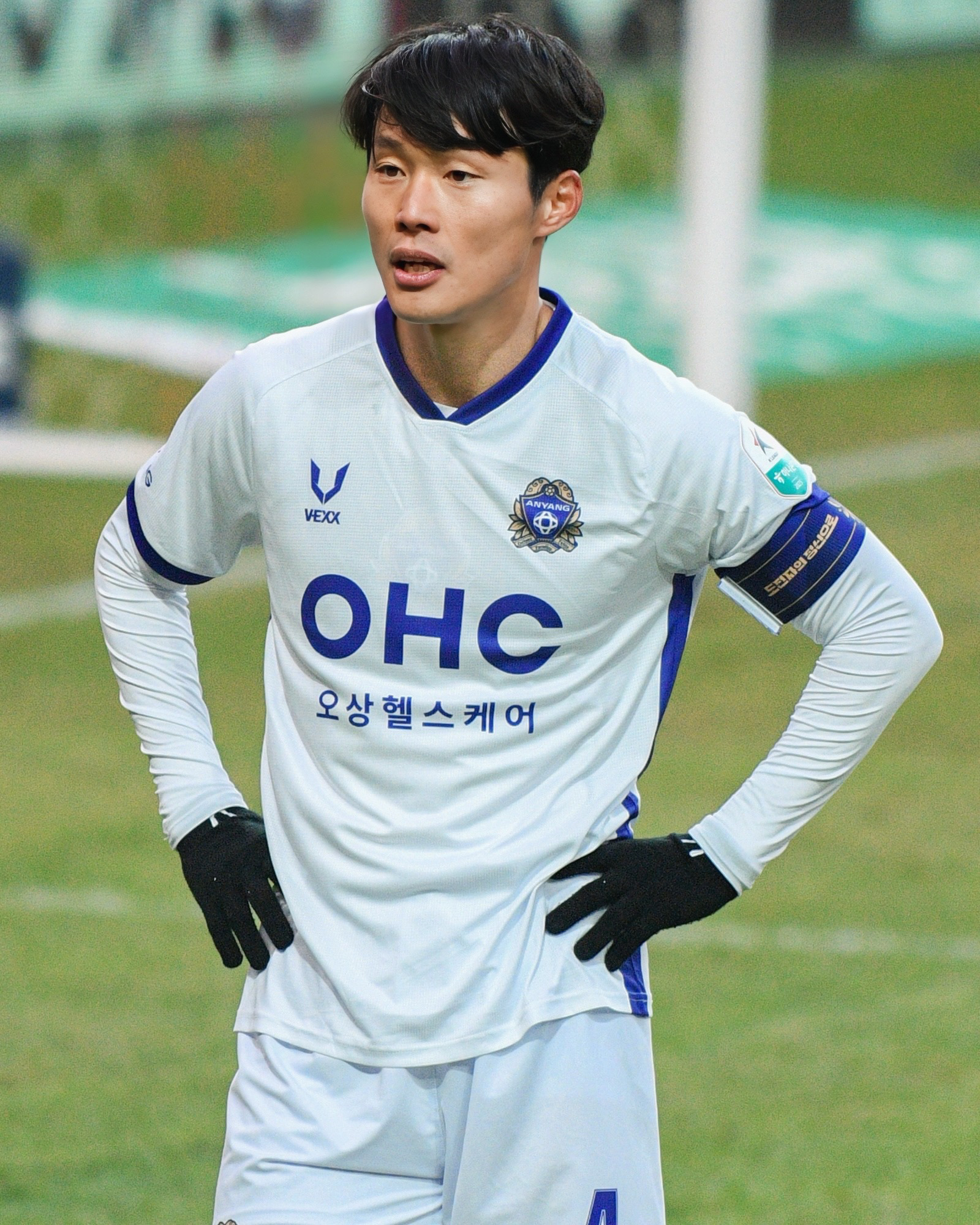
- Lee in 2025

Personal information
- Date of birth: 27 August 1990 (age 36)
- Place of birth: South Korea
- Height: 1.80 m (5 ft 11 in)
- Positions: Defender; midfielder

Team information
- Current team: FC Anyang
- Number: 4

Youth career
- Yongin University

Senior career*
Years	Team	Apps	(Gls)
2013–2014	Gangwon FC	27	(1)
2015–2018	Ulsan Hyundai	35	(1)
2017–2018	→ Asan Mugunghwa (army)	43	(2)
2019–2022	Seongnam FC	71	(4)
2022–	FC Anyang	130	(5)
- * Club domestic league appearances and goals as of 3 August 2026

Lee Chang-Yong (Korean: 이창용; born 27 August 1990) is a South Korean footballer who plays as defender for FC Anyang in K League 1.

== Career ==
He signed with Gangwon FC on 7 December 2012.

== Career statistics ==
As of match played 15 September 2024

Appearances and goals by club, season and competition
Club	Season	League			Cup		Continental		Other		Total	
Club	Season	Division	Apps	Goals	Apps	Goals	Apps	Goals	Apps	Goals	Apps	Goals
Gangwon FC	2013	K League 1	5	0	0	0	—		0	0	5	0
Gangwon FC	2014	K League 2	22	1	2	0	—		0	0	24	1
Gangwon FC	Total		27	1	2	0	—		0	0	29	1
Ulsan Hyundai	2015	K League 1	17	0	2	0	—		—		19	0
Ulsan Hyundai	2016	K League 1	16	0	3	2	—		—		19	2
Ulsan Hyundai	2018	K League 1	2	1	2	0	—		—		4	1
Ulsan Hyundai	Total		35	1	7	2	—		—		42	3
Asan Mugunghwa (army)	2017	K League 2	26	2	1	0	—		2	0	29	2
Asan Mugunghwa (army)	2018	K League 2	15	0	0	0	—		—		15	0
Asan Mugunghwa (army)	Total		41	2	1	0	—		2	0	44	2
Seongnam FC	2019	K League 1	25	2	1	0	—		—		26	2
Seongnam FC	2020	K League 1	19	2	3	1	—		—		22	3
Seongnam FC	2021	K League 1	27	0	0	0	—		—		27	0
Seongnam FC	Total		71	4	4	1	—		—		75	5
FC Anyang	2022	K League 2	29	3	0	0	—		3	0	32	3
FC Anyang	2023	K League 2	21	0	0	0	—		—		21	0
FC Anyang	2024	K League 2	25	0	0	0	—		—		25	0
FC Anyang	Total		75	3	0	0	—		3	0	78	3
Career total			249	11	14	3	0	0	5	0	268	14
