= 2015 King's Cup =

Tournament details
- Host country: Thailand
- Dates: 1–7 February
- Teams: 4 (from 2 confederations)
- Venue: 1 (in 1 host city)

Final positions
- Champions: South Korea U-23 (2nd title)
- Runners-up: Thailand

Tournament statistics
- Matches played: 6
- Goals scored: 20 (3.33 per match)
- Top scorer(s): (Thailand) Pokklaw Anan (Honduras) Alberth Elis (3 goals each)

The 2015 King's Cup is an international football competition, the 43rd edition of the tournament. It was a group tournament, with all matches held at the 80th Birthday Stadium in Nakhon Ratchasima, Thailand between 1 February and 7 February.

This edition features the hosts Thailand and three invited teams (Honduras, South Korea U-23 and Uzbekistan).

== Teams ==
- Honduras U-20^{1}
- South Korea U-23
- Thailand
- Uzbekistan U-23^{1}

^{1}replaced North Korea and Croatia.

== Squads ==
See 2015 King's Cup Squads

== Venue ==
Nakhon Ratchasima
80th Birthday Stadium
Capacity: 20,141
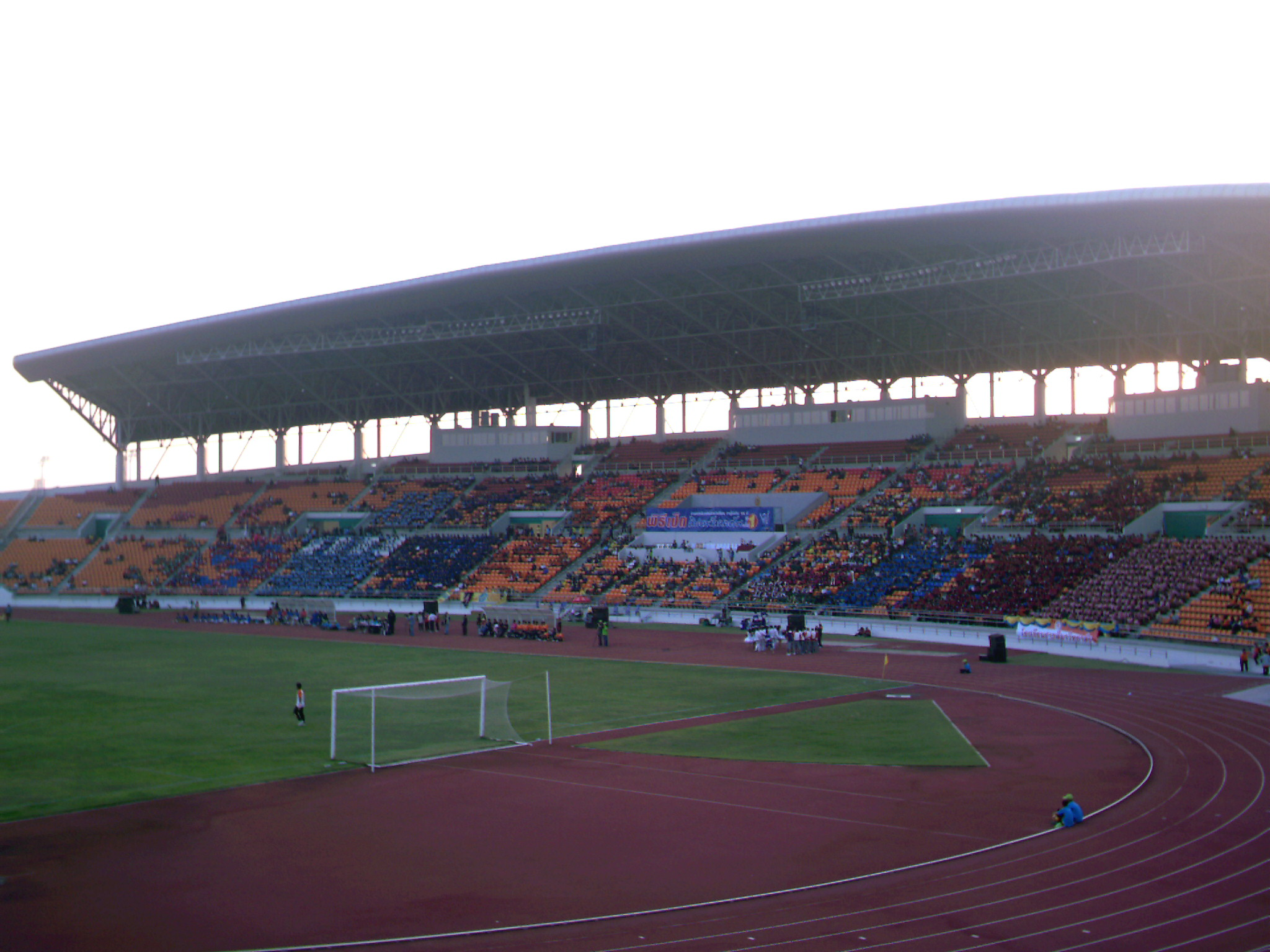

== Standings and results ==
All times are Thailand Standard Time (UTC+07:00).

Team	Pld	W	D	L	GF	GA	GD	Pts
South Korea U-23	3	2	1	0	3	0	+3	7
Thailand (H)	3	1	1	1	5	6	−1	4
Uzbekistan U-23	3	1	0	2	7	7	0	3
Honduras U-20	3	1	0	2	5	7	−2	3

(H) Hosts
1 February 2015
16:00

Uzbekistan U-23	0–1	South Korea U-23
		Song Ju-hun 22'

80th Birthday Stadium, Nakhon Ratchasima
Referee: Sivakorn Pu-Udom (Thailand)

1 February 2015
19:00

Thailand	3–1	Honduras U-20
Tossakrai 27'; Flores 67' (o.g.); Anan 80'		Elis 11'

80th Birthday Stadium, Nakhon Ratchasima
Referee: Hadimin Shahbuddin (Brunei)

4 February 2015
16:00

Honduras U-20	0–2	South Korea U-23
		Lee Chang-min 25'; Lee Woo-hyeok 83'

80th Birthday Stadium, Nakhon Ratchasima
Referee: Alongkorn Feemuechang (Thailand)

4 February 2015
19:00

Uzbekistan U-23	5–2	Thailand
Sabirkhodjaev 32'; Iskanderov 44'; Fomin 78'; Makhstaliev 81'; Sergeev 88'		Anan 8', 70'

80th Birthday Stadium, Nakhon Ratchasima
Referee: Phung Dinh Dung (Vietnam)

7 February 2015
16:00

Uzbekistan U-23	2–4	Honduras U-20
Turapov 6'; Flores 90+3' (o.g.)		Benavidez 11' (pen.), 34' (pen.); Elis 35', 74'

80th Birthday Stadium, Nakhon Ratchasima
Referee: Anuwat Feemuechang (Thailand)

7 February 2015
19:00

Thailand	0–0	South Korea U-23

80th Birthday Stadium, Nakhon Ratchasima
Referee: Phung Dinh Dung (Vietnam)

== Final standings ==
Rank	Team
1st place, gold medalist(s)	South Korea U23
2nd place, silver medalist(s)	Thailand
3rd place, bronze medalist(s)	Uzbekistan U23
4	Honduras U20

== Goalscorers ==
3 goals

- (Honduras) Alberth Elis
- (Thailand) Pokklaw Anan

2 goals

- (Honduras) Jhow Benavidez

1 goals

- (South Korea) Lee Chang-min
- (South Korea) Lee Woo-hyeok
- (South Korea) Song Ju-hun
- (Thailand) Mongkol Tossakrai
- (Uzbekistan) Abbosbek Makhstaliev
- (Uzbekistan) Dirojon Turapov
- (Uzbekistan) Igor Sergeev
- (Uzbekistan) Jamshid Iskanderov
- (Uzbekistan) Maksimilian Fomin
- (Uzbekistan) Sardor Sabirkhodjaev

2 own goals

- (Honduras) Jeffri Flores (against Thailand), (against Uzbekistan U23)

== See also ==
- King's Cup
- Football in Thailand
