= Song Ju-hun =

South Korean footballer (born 1994)

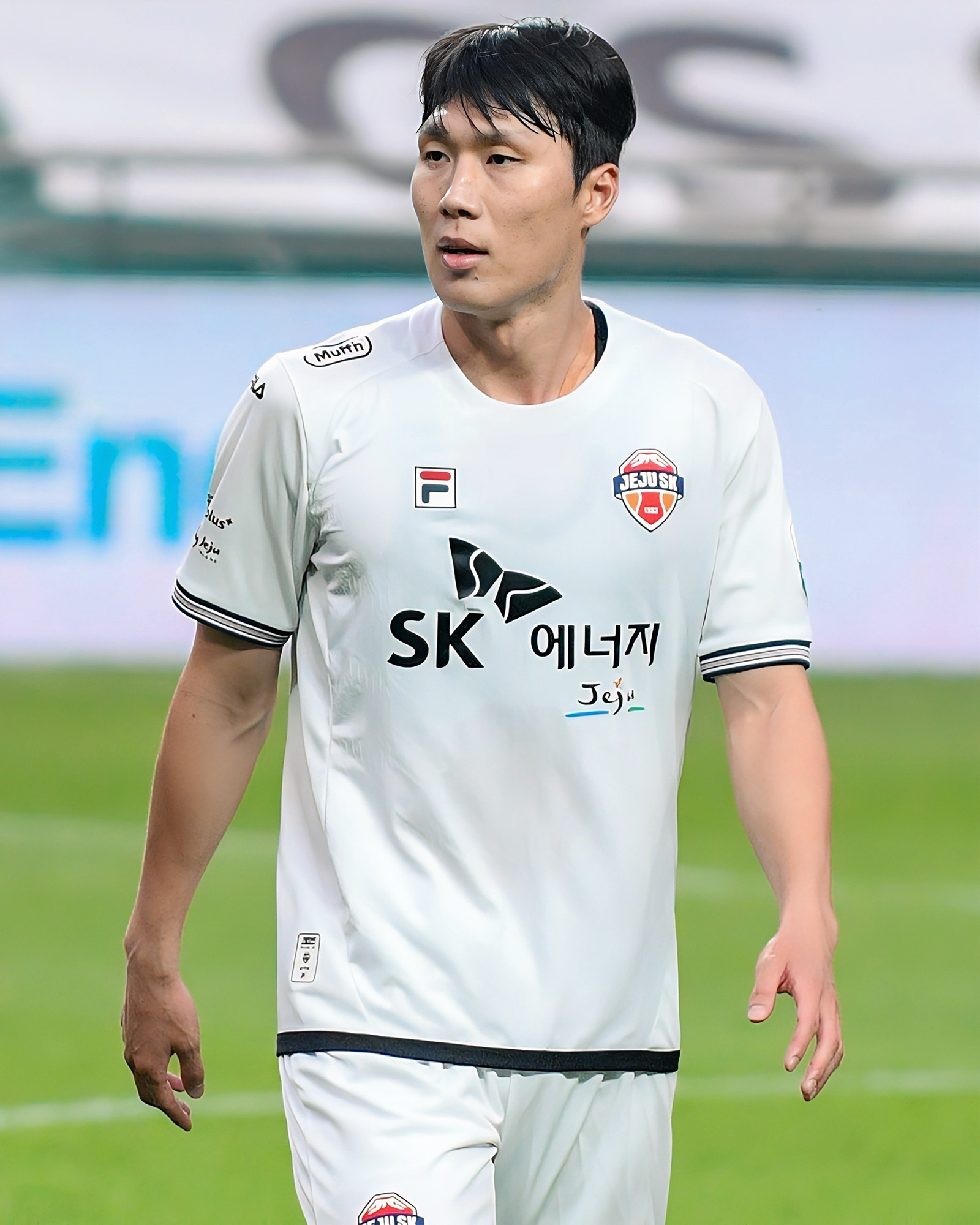
- Song in 2025

Personal information
- Date of birth: 13 January 1994 (age 32)
- Place of birth: Gumi, North Gyeongsang, South Korea
- Height: 1.90 m (6 ft 3 in)
- Position: Defender

Team information
- Current team: Suwon Samsung Bluewings
- Number: 4

Youth career
- 2010–2013: Konkuk University

Senior career*
Years	Team	Apps	(Gls)
2014–2018	Albirex Niigata	52	(0)
2015–2016	→ Mito HollyHock (loan)	27	(1)
2019	Gyeongnam	9	(0)
2019–2020	Tianjin Tianhai	14	(2)
2020	Shenzhen FC	11	(0)
2021–2025	Jeju United	77	(3)
2021–2022	Gimcheon Sangmu (draft)	21	(0)
2026–	Suwon Samsung Bluewings	9	(1)

International career^{‡}
2010	South Korea U-17	3	(0)
2012–2013	South Korea U-20	17	(1)
2014–2016	South Korea U-23	23	(1)
2017–	South Korea	1	(0)
Korean name
Hangul	송주훈
Hanja	宋株熏
RR	Song Juhun
MR	Song Chuhun
- * Club domestic league appearances and goals as of 5 August 2026 ‡ National team caps and goals as of 10 October 2017

Song Ju-hun (Korean: 송주훈; born 13 January 1994) is a South Korean football player who currently plays as a defender for Suwon Samsung Bluewings in K League 1.

== Club career ==
Song Ju-hun would play College football for Konkuk University in South Korea before joining Japanese football club Albirex Niigata on 16 January 2014. Song would make his debut on 30 August 2014 in a league game against Gamba Osaka that ended in a 5–0 defeat. After that game he was used sparingly and was sent on loan to second-tier club Mito HollyHock. Upon his return he would establish himself as a regular within the team, however he was part of the squad that was relegated to the second tier at the end of the 2017 J1 League season.

On 10 January 2019, Song returned to South Korea to join top-tier club Gyeongnam on a free transfer after his contract finished with Albirex Niigata. On 9 July 2019 he joined Chinese top-tier club Tianjin Tianhai. In July 2020, Song signed with Shenzhen FC on a six-month contract. On 11 January 2021, Song returned to South Korean, joining K League 1 club Jeju United. On 28 June 2021, he joined Gimcheon Sangmu, as part of the draft.

== International career ==
Song Ju-hun would represent the South Korean U-20 team in the 2013 FIFA U-20 World Cup where he played in five games and scored one goal as his team were knocked out in the quarter-finals to Iraq in a penalty shoot-out.

He would go on to make his senior international debut on 10 October 2017 in a friendly match against Morocco that ended in a 3–1 defeat.

== Career statistics ==
=== Club ===
As of match played 7 December 2025

Appearances and goals by club, season and competition
Club	Season	League			National Cup		League Cup		Continental		Total	
Club	Season	Division	Apps	Goals	Apps	Goals	Apps	Goals	Apps	Goals	Apps	Goals
Albirex Niigata	2014	J1 League	2	0	1	0	3	0	—		6	0
Albirex Niigata	2015	J1 League	0	0	0	0	0	0	—		0	0
Albirex Niigata	2017	J1 League	27	0	1	0	3	0	—		31	0
Albirex Niigata	2018	J2 League	23	0	0	0	—		—		23	0
Albirex Niigata	Total		52	0	2	0	6	0	—		60	0
Mito HollyHock (loan)	2015	J2 League	8	0	2	0	—		—		10	0
Mito HollyHock (loan)	2016	J2 League	19	1	0	0	—		—		19	1
Mito HollyHock (loan)	Total		27	1	2	0	—		—		29	1
Gyeongnam	2019	K League 1	9	0	1	0	—		4	0	14	0
Tianjin Tianhai	2019	Chinese Super League	14	2	1	0	—		—		15	2
Shenzhen FC	2020	Chinese Super League	13	0	1	0	—		—		14	0
Jeju United	2021	K League 1	0	0	0	0	—		—		0	0
Jeju United	2023	K League 1	13	1	0	0	—		—		13	1
Jeju United	2024	K League 1	27	1	2	0	—		—		29	1
Jeju United	2025	K League 1	35	1	0	0	—		2	0	37	1
Jeju United	Total		75	3	2	0	—		2	0	79	3
Gimcheon Sangmu (draft)	2021	K League 2	3	0	1	0	—		—		4	0
Gimcheon Sangmu (draft)	2022	K League 1	18	0	0	0	—		—		18	0
Gimcheon Sangmu (draft)	Total		21	0	1	0	—		—		22	0
Career total			211	6	10	0	6	0	6	0	233	6

=== International ===
National team
Year	Apps	Goals
2017	1	0
Total	1	0

== Honours ==
=== International ===
South Korea U-20

- AFC U-19 Championship: 2012

South Korea U-23

- King's Cup: 2015
