= Dang Seong-jeung =

South Korean footballer and manager

Personal information
- Full name: Dang Seong-jeung
- Date of birth: 4 January 1966 (age 60)
- Place of birth: South Korea
- Position: Midfielder

Senior career*
Years	Team	Apps	(Gls)
1990–1991	LG Cheetahs	1	(0)

Managerial career
- 2005–2008: Ulsan Hyundai U-15
- 2009: Ulsan Hyundai (coach)
- 2010–2011: Daegu FC (coach)
- 2011–2012: Daegu FC (assistant)
- 2013: Daegu FC
- 2014-2019: Cheonan City FC
- * Club domestic league appearances and goals

Dang Seong-jeung (Korean: 당성증; born 4 January 1966) is a retired South Korean footballer and coach. On 29 November 2012, he was appointed manager of Daegu FC.
