= Kim Shin-wook =

South Korean footballer (born 1988)

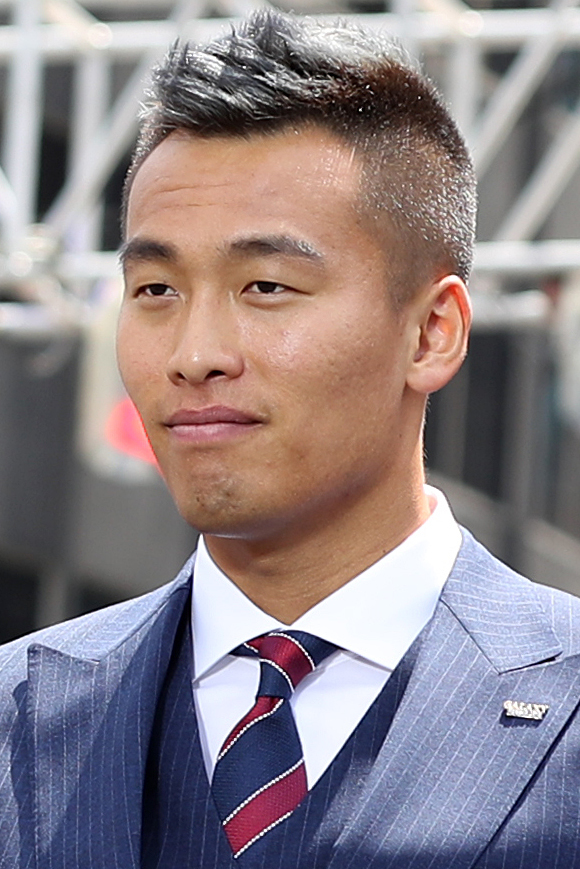
- Kim in 2018

Personal information
- Full name: Kim Shin-wook
- Date of birth: 14 April 1988 (age 38)
- Place of birth: Gwacheon, South Korea
- Height: 1.96 m (6 ft 5 in)
- Position: Striker

Youth career
- 2004–2006: Gwacheon High School

College career
Years	Team	Apps	(Gls)
2007–2008	Chung-Ang University		

Senior career*
Years	Team	Apps	(Gls)
2009–2015	Ulsan Hyundai	215	(81)
2016–2019	Jeonbuk Hyundai Motors	118	(37)
2019–2021	Shanghai Shenhua	24	(14)
2022	Lion City Sailors	26	(21)
2023–2025	Kitchee	5	(3)

International career^{‡}
2014	South Korea U23	3 (Note: Appearances as an overage player in Asian Games)	(1)
2010–2021	South Korea	56	(16)
Medal record
Men's football
Representing South Korea
AFC Asian Cup
Bronze medal – third place	2011 Qatar
Asian Games
Gold medal – first place	2014 Incheon
EAFF Championship
Winner	2015 China
Winner	2017 Japan
Bronze medal – third place	2013 South Korea
- * Club domestic league appearances and goals as of 2 November 2025 ‡ National team caps and goals as of 9 June 2021

- Kim Shin-wook
- Hangul: 김신욱
- Hanja: 金信煜
- RR: Gim Sinuk
- MR: Kim Sinuk

Kim Shin-wook (Korean: 김신욱; Hanja: 金信煜; pronounced [kim.ɕi.nuk̚]; born 14 April 1988) is a South Korean former professional footballer who played as a striker.

== Club career ==
=== Ulsan Hyundai ===
Kim spent his youth training either as a central defender or defensive midfielder, but upon suggestion by his manager, he changed his position into a forward a few weeks after signing his first professional contract with K League club Ulsan Hyundai.

Kim was a very influential figure during Ulsan's road to the 2012 AFC Champions League title. When he showed his abilities as a target man as well as scoring six goals at the tournament, he started to be called "The Attack Titan" or "Chinook".

=== Shanghai Shenhua ===
On 8 July 2019, Kim joined Chinese Super League club Shanghai Shenhua and was reunited with his manager at Jeonbuk Hyundai Motors, Choi Kang-hee. He would make his debut in a league game against Hebei where he also scored his first goal for the club in a 2–1 defeat. After that game Kim quickly established himself as an integral member of the team and he would personally score 10 goals in 15 games as the club moved away from the relegation zone and went on to win the 2019 Chinese FA Cup.

=== Lion City Sailors ===
On 15 November 2021, Kim joined Singapore Premier League club Lion City Sailors on a three-year contract reportedly worth more than S$3 million, after his contract at Shanghai had ended. He would make his debut in the 2022 Singapore Community Shield game against Albirex Niigata (S) where he scored his first goal and a brace for the club in a 2–1 win, winning his first silverware with the Sailors in a dream debut.

On 1 April, Kim scored his first hat-trick for the Sailors, as the club cruised to a 4–0 victory against Balestier Khalsa during the 2022 Singapore Premier League season. On 6 May, Kim scored his second hat-trick in a 4–3 home win against Hougang United. He would then go on to scored his third hat-trick against Young Lions in the club biggest ever 10–1 win on 13 August. Kim recorded his fourth hat-trick for the club on 26 August in a 9–4 away win against Hougang United.

On 30 January 2023, Kim departed from Lion City Sailors by mutual consent amidst criticism of his mobility and cost cutting at parent company Sea Limited. He scored 24 goals in 35 appearances for the club in all competition.

=== Kitchee ===
On 2 February 2023, Kim officially joined Hong Kong Premier League club Kitchee on a free transfer, signing a contract until 2026. He made his debut for the club on 4 March in a 4–0 league win against HK U23.

Being unable to score in the 2022–23 season after making 7 appearances in all competitions, there are rumours that Kitchee was going to terminate Kim’s contract. However, Kim still appears on the team squad in the 2023–24 season and on 27 August 2023, he scored a hat-trick on his first appearance in the league against HKFC in a 8–0 win. On 8 November 2023, Kim became the first player to play in the AFC Champions League with 5 different clubs after coming on as a substitute in a 1–1 draw against Thailand side Bangkok United. On 4 November 2023, he scored a brace during the Hong Kong Senior Challenge Shield in a 7–0 against Resources Capital. On 13 December 2023, Kim played in the final AFC Champions League group stage fixture against his former club Lion City Sailors at the Jalan Besar Stadium.

Kim appears again in the Kitchee first team in the 2025–26 season, coming on as a substitute against Rangers in the Hong Kong League Cup and scoring a header. He came on as a sub again in the league game against Kowloon City but failed to score.

On 22 December 2025, it was announced that Kim's contract had been terminated by the club due to a "serious breach of Kitchee's Code of Conduct." He made 16 appearances and six goals for three years at the club.

== International career ==
Kim was selected for the South Korean squad for the 2014 FIFA World Cup, and his aerial duels against Algerian and Belgian players received compliments from the South Korean press. He was expected to dominate the air at the 2018 FIFA World Cup like at the previous tournament, but he reproached himself for his performance against Sweden after the tournament.

In October 2014, Kim and his teammates were exempted from military service after winning a gold at the 2014 Asian Games.

== Personal life ==
Kim is known to be a devout Christian who reads the bible before games and is nicknamed "church brother" by his teammates. He sometimes participates in evangelizing activities.

== Style of play ==
A tall forward, with a slender physique, Kim was known for possessing a good first touch, as well as an eye for goal; however, he was also known for his lack of significant pace, strength, power, and athleticism, while his movement occasionally came under criticism from fans. He usually played as a target man in a striker role throughout his career due to his ability to hold up the ball with his back to goal and link-up with his teammates. Although he was criticised in his youth for his limited ability in the air, despite his height, and for his inability to out–jump other players, he was also known for his longevity, and had a penchant for scoring acrobatic goals from bicycle kicks.

== Career statistics ==
=== Club ===
As of 2 November 2025

Appearances and goals by club, season and competition
Club	Season	League			National cup		League cup		Continental		Other		Total	
Club	Season	Division	Apps	Goals	Apps	Goals	Apps	Goals	Apps	Goals	Apps	Goals	Apps	Goals
Ulsan Hyundai	2009	K League	23	7	1	1	4	0	5	1	—		33	9
Ulsan Hyundai	2010	K League	28	7	1	1	5	3	—		—		34	11
Ulsan Hyundai	2011	K League	35	8	4	0	8	11	—		—		47	19
Ulsan Hyundai	2012	K League	35	13	4	3	—		11	6	2 (Note: Appearances in FIFA Club World Cup)	0	52	22
Ulsan Hyundai	2013	K League 1	36	19	2	0	—		—		—		38	19
Ulsan Hyundai	2014	K League 1	20	9	2	0	—		5	2	—		27	11
Ulsan Hyundai	2015	K League 1	38	18	4	2	—		—		—		42	20
Ulsan Hyundai	Total		215	81	18	7	17	14	21	9	2	0	273	111
Jeonbuk Hyundai Motors	2016	K League 1	33	7	2	2	—		12	1	2	1	49	11
Jeonbuk Hyundai Motors	2017	K League 1	35	10	1	0	—		—		—		36	10
Jeonbuk Hyundai Motors	2018	K League 1	33	11	2	0	—		10	6	—		45	17
Jeonbuk Hyundai Motors	2019	K League 1	17	9	1	0	—		7	4	—		25	13
Jeonbuk Hyundai Motors	Total		118	37	6	2	—		29	11	2	1	155	51
Shanghai Shenhua	2019	Chinese Super League	12	9	3	1	—		—		—		15	10
Shanghai Shenhua	2020	Chinese Super League	4	3	0	0	—		3	0	—		7	3
Shanghai Shenhua	2021	Chinese Super League	8	2	0	0	—		—		—		8	2
Shanghai Shenhua	Total		24	14	3	1	—		3	0	—		30	15
Lion City Sailors	2022	Singapore Premier League	26	21	0	0	0	0	5	0	1 (Note: Appearances in Singapore Community Shield)	2	32	23
Kitchee	2022–23	Hong Kong Premier League	3	0	1	0	3	0	0	0	0	0	7	0
Kitchee	2023–24	Hong Kong Premier League	1	3	0	0	3	0	2	0	1 (Note: Appearances in Hong Kong Senior Challenge Shield)	2	7	5
Kitchee	2025–26	Hong Kong Premier League	1	0	0	0	1	1	—		0	0	2	1
Kitchee	Total		5	3	1	0	7	1	2	0	1	2	16	6
Career total			388	156	28	10	24	15	60	20	6	5	506	206

=== International ===
As of 9 June 2021

Appearances and goals by national team and year
National team	Year	Apps	Goals
South Korea	2010	3	0
South Korea	2011	3	0
South Korea	2012	7	1
South Korea	2013	9	1
South Korea	2014	7	1
South Korea	2015	3	0
South Korea	2016	4	0
South Korea	2017	5	3
South Korea	2018	10	4
South Korea	2019	4	4
South Korea	2021	1	2
Career total		56	16

Scores and results list South Korea's goal tally first, score column indicates score after each Kim goal.

List of international goals scored by Kim Shin-wook
No.	Date	Venue	Opponent	Score	Result	Competition
1	8 June 2012	Jassim Bin Hamad Stadium, Doha, Qatar	Qatar	3–1	4–1	2014 FIFA World Cup qualification
2	19 November 2013	Zabeel Stadium, Dubai, United Arab Emirates	Russia	1–0	1–2	Friendly
3	25 January 2014	Los Angeles Memorial Coliseum, Los Angeles, United States	Costa Rica	1–0	1–0	Friendly
4	9 December 2017	Ajinomoto Stadium, Tokyo, Japan	China	1–1	2–2	2017 EAFF Championship
5	16 December 2017	Ajinomoto Stadium, Tokyo, Japan	Japan	1–1	4–1	2017 EAFF Championship
6	16 December 2017	Ajinomoto Stadium, Tokyo, Japan	Japan	3–1	4–1	2017 EAFF Championship
7	27 January 2018	Mardan Stadium, Antalya, Turkey	Moldova	1–0	1–0	Friendly
8	30 January 2018	Mardan Stadium, Antalya, Turkey	Jamaica	1–1	2–2	Friendly
9	30 January 2018	Mardan Stadium, Antalya, Turkey	Jamaica	2–1	2–2	Friendly
10	3 February 2018	Mardan Stadium, Antalya, Turkey	Latvia	1–0	1–0	Friendly
11	10 October 2019	Hwaseong Stadium, Hwaseong, South Korea	Sri Lanka	2–0	8–0	2022 FIFA World Cup qualification
12	10 October 2019	Hwaseong Stadium, Hwaseong, South Korea	Sri Lanka	4–0	8–0	2022 FIFA World Cup qualification
13	10 October 2019	Hwaseong Stadium, Hwaseong, South Korea	Sri Lanka	6–0	8–0	2022 FIFA World Cup qualification
14	10 October 2019	Hwaseong Stadium, Hwaseong, South Korea	Sri Lanka	7–0	8–0	2022 FIFA World Cup qualification
15	9 June 2021	Goyang Stadium, Goyang, South Korea	Sri Lanka	1–0	5–0	2022 FIFA World Cup qualification
16	9 June 2021	Goyang Stadium, Goyang, South Korea	Sri Lanka	3–0	5–0	2022 FIFA World Cup qualification

== Honours ==
Ulsan Hyundai

- Korean League Cup: 2011
- AFC Champions League: 2012

Jeonbuk Hyundai Motors

- K League 1: 2017, 2018
- AFC Champions League: 2016

Shanghai Shenhua

- Chinese FA Cup: 2019

Lion City Sailors

- Singapore Community Shield: 2022

Kitchee

- Hong Kong Premier League: 2022–23
- Hong Kong FA Cup: 2022–23
- Hong Kong Senior Challenge Shield: 2023–24
- HKPLC Cup: 2023–24

South Korea U23

- Asian Games: 2014

South Korea

- AFC Asian Cup third place: 2011
- EAFF Championship: 2015, 2017

Individual

- Korean League Cup top goalscorer: 2011
- K League All-Star: 2013, 2014, 2015, 2017
- K League 1 Most Valuable Player: 2013
- K League 1 Best XI: 2013
- K League 1 top goalscorer: 2015
- EAFF Championship top goalscorer: 2017
- AFC Champions League All-Star Squad: 2018
- K League Player of the Month: May 2019
