= Pedro Júnior =

Brazilian footballer

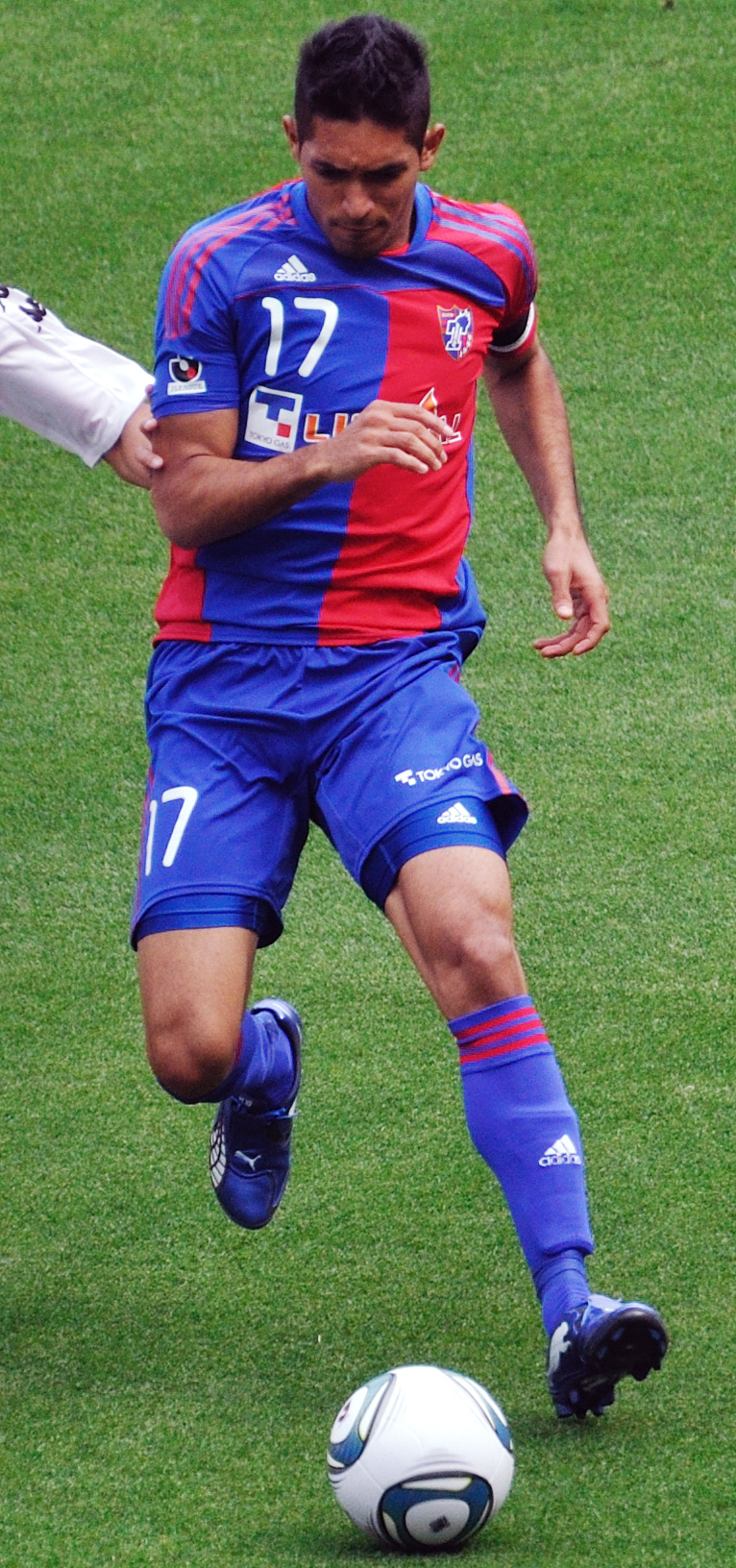

Personal information
- Full name: Pedro Bispo Moreira Júnior
- Date of birth: January 29, 1987 (age 39)
- Place of birth: Santana do Araguaia, Pará, Brazil
- Height: 1.82 m (5 ft 11 1/2 in)
- Position: Forward

Youth career
- 2003–2004: Vila Nova

Senior career*
Years	Team	Apps	(Gls)
2005	Vila Nova	3	(1)
2005–2006	→ Grêmio (loan)	30	(5)
2007	→ Cruzeiro (loan)		
2007	→ São Caetano (loan)		
2007–2009	Omiya Ardija	15	(2)
2008	→ Vila Nova (loan)	18	(7)
2009	→ Albirex Niigata (loan)	21	(10)
2009–2011	Gamba Osaka	9	(3)
2010	→ Sport Recife (loan)	8	(1)
2010	→ Vila Nova (loan)	2	(1)
2011	→ FC Tokyo (loan)	2	(0)
2012	São Caetano	7	(0)
2012	Vila Nova	17	(9)
2013	Jeju United	29	(17)
2014–2016	Vissel Kobe	74	(25)
2017–2018	Kashima Antlers	28	(7)
2018	→ Wuhan Zall (loan)	6	(6)
2019	Fortaleza	0	(0)
2019	Buriram United	15	(6)
2019	Khor Fakkan	2	(0)
2020	Samut Prakan City	3	(0)
2020	CSA	20	(5)
2020–2021	Vila Nova	34	(6)
2022	Ponte Preta	10	(0)
Total		353	(111)
- * Club domestic league appearances and goals as of 24 May 2022

Pedro Bispo Moreira Júnior (born January 29, 1987), or simply Pedro Júnior, is a Brazilian footballer who plays as a forward.

== Club career ==
On 13 January 2020, it was confirmed that Júnior would join the Thai League club Samut Prakan City for the 2020 season.

== Club statistics ==
Updated to 25 May 2022.

Club	Season	League			State League		Cup		League Cup		Continental		Other		Total	
Club	Season	Division	Apps	Goals	Apps	Goals	Apps	Goals	Apps	Goals	Apps	Goals	Apps	Goals	Apps	Goals
Omiya Ardija	2007	J1 League	6	0	—		0	0	0	0	—		—		6	0
Omiya Ardija	2008	J1 League	9	2	—		0	0	3	1	—		—		12	3
Omiya Ardija	Total		15	2	—		0	0	3	1	—		—		18	3
Vila Nova (loan)	2008	Série B	18	7	—		—		—		—		—		18	7
Albirex Niigata (loan)	2009	J1 League	21	10	—		0	0	3	0	—		—		24	10
Gamba Osaka	2009	J1 League	7	3	—		3	2	0	0	—		—		10	5
Gamba Osaka	2010	J1 League	2	0	—		0	0	0	0	1	0	—		3	0
Gamba Osaka	Total		9	3	—		3	2	0	0	1	0	—		13	5
Sport Recife (loan)	2010	Série B	6	1	—		2	0	—		—		—		8	1
Vila Nova (loan)	2010	Série B	2	1	—		—		—		—		—		2	1
FC Tokyo (loan)	2011	J2 League	2	0	—		0	0	0	0	–		–		2	0
São Caetano	2012	Paulista	—		7	0	—		—		—		—		7	0
Vila Nova	2012	Série C	17	9	—		—		—		—		—		17	9
Jeju United	2013	K League	29	17	—		3	1	—		—		—		32	18
Vissel Kobe	2014	J1 League	32	13	—		1	0	5	1	—		—		38	14
Vissel Kobe	2015	J1 League	13	1	—		1	0	4	2	–		–		18	3
Vissel Kobe	2016	J1 League	29	11	—		3	4	5	3	–		–		37	18
Vissel Kobe	Total		74	25	—		5	4	14	6	—		—		93	35
Kashima Antlers	2017	J1 League	21	7	—		1	0	0	0	5	3	1	0	28	10
Kashima Antlers	2018	J1 League	7	0	—		0	0	0	0	3	0	–		10	0
Kashima Antlers	Total		28	7	—		1	0	0	0	8	3	1	0	38	10
Wuhan Zall (loan)	2018	China League One	6	6	—		0	0	–		–		–		6	6
Fortaleza	2019	Série A	—		—		—		—		—		1	0	1	0
Buriram United	2019	Thai League 1	15	6	—		2	2	1	2	5	1	—		23	11
Khor Fakkan	2019–20	UAE Pro League	2	0	—		—		3	1	—		—		5	1
Samut Prakan City	2020–21	Thai League 1	3	0	—		—		—		—		—		3	0
CSA	2020	Série B	20	5	—		—		—		—		1	0	21	5
Vila Nova	2021	Série B	19	2	15	4	4	1	—		—		3	7	41	14
Ponte Preta	2022	Série B	2	0	8	0	1	0	—		—		—		11	0
Total			288	103	30	4	21	10	24	10	14	4	6	7	383	136

^{1}Includes Japanese Super Cup.

== Honours ==
- Brazilian League (2nd division) – 2005
- Rio Grande do Sul State League – 2006
- Chile Octagonal Tournament – 2005
- Emperor's Cup – 2009
- Campeonato Pernambucano in 2010 with Sport Recife

Wuhan Zall

- China League One: 2018
