= Lee Woo-hyeok =

South Korean footballer (born 1993)

Lee Woo-Hyeok
Personal information
- Full name: Lee Woo-Hyeok
- Date of birth: 24 February 1993 (age 33)
- Place of birth: Gangneung, South Korea
- Height: 1.85 m (6 ft 1 in)
- Position: Midfielder

Team information
- Current team: Pyeongchang United
- Number: 23

Youth career
- 2003–2004: Toksong Elementary School
- 2005: Hanyang Middle School
- 2006–2007: Joondong Middle School
- 2008–2010: Gangneung Jeil High School

Senior career*
| Years | Team | Apps | (Gls) |
| 2011–2015 | Gangwon FC | 78 | (3) |
| 2016 | Jeonbuk Hyundai | 2 | (0) |
| 2017 | Gwangju FC | 19 | (1) |
| 2018–2021 | Incheon United | 17 | (2) |
| 2021–2023 | Gyeongnam FC | 59 | (0) |
| 2023– | Pyeongchang United | 12 | (0) |

International career
| 2014–2015 | South Korea U23 | 6 | (1) |
- * Club domestic league appearances and goals as of 07:52, 24 March 2024 (UTC)

Lee Woo-Hyeok (Korean: 이우혁; born 27 February 1993) is a South Korean footballer who plays as a midfielder for K4 League club Pyeongchang United.

== Club career ==
After graduating high school, Lee joined Gangwon FC as an 18-year-old. He appeared in seven league games in his debut season. He spent most of the 2013 season on the bench, but after his team was relegated to the K League Challenge in 2014, he was given more opportunities. Based on his good performances in the K League Challenge, he returned to the K League Classic by joining Jeonbuk Hyundai Motors ahead of the 2016 season. He was part of the team winning the 2016 AFC Champions League.

However, Lee failed to make an impact at Jeonbuk and moved to Gwangju FC alongside team-mate Lee Han-do for the 2017 season. He returned to good form with Gwangju and played a major role, which, however, could not prevent the team from relegating.

Lee moved to Incheon United ahead of the 2018 season.

He moved to Gyeongnam FC in K League 2 ahead of the 2021 season. He made his competitive debut for the club on 27 February 2021, the first matchday of the season, coming on as a late substitute for Chang Hyuk-jin in a 2–1 home loss to FC Anyang.

In 2023, he joined K4 League club Pyeongchang United where he played during military service.

== Personal life ==
His brother-in-law is Bae Hyo-sung, who was his team-mate at Gangwon FC.

== Career statistics ==
As of match played 9 October 2022

Appearances and goals by club, season and competition
| Club | Season | League | | | National cup | | Continental | | Other | | Total | |
| Club | Season | Division | Apps | Goals | Apps | Goals | Apps | Goals | Apps | Goals | Apps | Goals |
|---|---|---|---|---|---|---|---|---|---|---|---|---|
| Gangwon FC | 2011 | K League | 7 | 0 | 1 | 0 | — | | 0 | 0 | 8 | 0 |
| Gangwon FC | 2012 | K League | 8 | 0 | 0 | 0 | — | | — | | 8 | 0 |
| Gangwon FC | 2013 | K League | 12 | 1 | 1 | 0 | — | | 2 (Note: Appearances in K League relegation playoffs) | 0 | 15 | 1 |
| Gangwon FC | 2014 | K League 2 | 30 | 2 | 4 | 0 | — | | 0 | 0 | 34 | 2 |
| Gangwon FC | 2015 | K League 2 | 21 | 0 | 1 | 0 | — | | — | | 22 | 0 |
| Gangwon FC | Total | | 78 | 3 | 7 | 0 | 0 | 0 | 2 | 0 | 87 | 3 |
| Jeonbuk Hyundai Motors | 2016 | K League | 2 | 0 | 1 | 0 | 0 | 0 | — | | 3 | 0 |
| Gwangju FC | 2017 | K League | 19 | 1 | 2 | 0 | — | | — | | 21 | 1 |
| Incheon United | 2018 | K League | 1 | 0 | 1 | 0 | — | | — | | 2 | 0 |
| Incheon United | 2019 | K League | 8 | 2 | 1 | 0 | — | | — | | 9 | 2 |
| Incheon United | 2020 | K League | 8 | 0 | 0 | 0 | — | | — | | 8 | 0 |
| Incheon United | Total | | 17 | 2 | 2 | 0 | — | | — | | 19 | 2 |
| Gyeongnam FC | 2021 | K League 2 | 26 | 0 | 1 | 0 | — | | — | | 27 | 0 |
| Gyeongnam FC | 2022 | K League 2 | 33 | 0 | 0 | 0 | — | | 0 | 0 | 33 | 0 |
| Gyeongnam FC | Total | | 59 | 0 | 1 | 0 | — | | 0 | 0 | 60 | 0 |
| Career total | | | 175 | 6 | 13 | 0 | 0 | 0 | 2 | 0 | 190 | 6 |

== Honours ==
Jeonbuk Hyundai Motors

- AFC Champions League: 2016
