= Park Sang-jin =

South Korean footballer

Personal information
- Full name: Park Sang-jin
- Date of birth: March 3, 1987 (age 39)
- Place of birth: South Korea
- Height: 1.70 m (5 ft 7 in)
- Position: Defender

Team information
- Current team: Gangwon FC
- Number: 13

Youth career
- 2006–2009: Kyunghee University

Senior career*
Years	Team	Apps	(Gls)
2010–	Gangwon FC	76	(0)
- * Club domestic league appearances and goals as of 20 November 2014

- Park Sang-jin
- Hangul: 박상진
- Hanja: 朴相珍
- RR: Bak Sangjin
- MR: Pak Sangjin

Park Sang-jin (Korean: 박상진; Hanja: 朴相珍, born 3 March 1987) is a South Korean football player who plays as a fullback for South Korean club that K-League side Gangwon FC.

== Club career ==
=== Gangwon FC ===
On 17 November 2009, he parted 2010 K-League draft, but he wasn't called any clubs in 2010 K-League draft. Park was joined Gangwon FC lately in the preseason. His first K-League match was against Pohang Steelers in Pohang that Gangwon lose by 0-4 in away game on 20 March 2010.

=== Statistics ===
As of 31 October 2011

Club performance			League		Cup		League Cup		Total	
Season	Club	League	Apps	Goals	Apps	Goals	Apps	Goals	Apps	Goals
South Korea			League		KFA Cup		League Cup		Total	
2010	Gangwon FC	K-League	18	0	1	0	4	0	23	0
2011	Gangwon FC	K-League	20	0	2	0	3	0	25	0
Career total			38	0	3	0	7	0	48	0
