= Park Min =

South Korean footballer

Personal information
- Full name: Park Min
- Date of birth: 6 May 1986 (age 40)
- Place of birth: Seoul, South Korea
- Height: 1.84 m (6 ft 1/2 in)
- Position: Centre back

Team information
- Current team: Bucheon FC

Youth career
- 2005–2008: Daegu University

Senior career*
Years	Team	Apps	(Gls)
2009–2011	Gyeongnam FC	28	(1)
2012	Gwangju FC	21	(2)
2013	Gangwon FC	20	(1)
2014–2016	FC Anyang	23	(2)
2015–2016	→ Hwaseong FC (loan)		
2017–	Bucheon FC	15	(1)
- * Club domestic league appearances and goals as of 1 January 2018

- Park Min
- Hangul: 박민
- Hanja: 朴愍
- RR: Bak Min
- MR: Pak Min

Park Min (Korean: 박민; born 6 May 1986) is a South Korean footballer who plays as centre back for Bucheon FC in the K League 2.

== Personal life ==
In July 2022, Park announced that he would be marrying comedian Oh Na-mi in September 2022.

== Club career ==
Park started his professionally in Gyeongnam FC. He scored twice his first match against Jeonbuk Hyundai Motors in the Peace Cup Korea.

=== Career statistics ===
As of 6 March 2011

Club performance			League		Cup		League Cup		Total	
Season	Club	League	Apps	Goals	Apps	Goals	Apps	Goals	Apps	Goals
South Korea			League		KFA Cup		League Cup		Total	
2009	Gyeongnam FC	K-League	17	0	1	0	4	2	22	2
2010	Gyeongnam FC	K-League	3	0	0	0	1	0	4	0
2011	Gyeongnam FC	K-League	1	0					1	0
Career total			21	0	1	1	5	2	27	2
