= Lee Chang-min (footballer) =

South Korean footballer

Lee Chang-Min
- Lee in 2026

Personal information
- Date of birth: 20 January 1994 (age 32)
- Place of birth: Gyeongsan, South Korea
- Height: 1.78 m (5 ft 10 in)
- Position: Central midfielder

Team information
- Current team: Jeju United
- Number: 8

Youth career
- 2012–2013: Chungang University

Senior career*
Years	Team	Apps	(Gls)
2014–2015	Bucheon FC	0	(0)
2014	→ Gyeongnam FC (loan)	32	(2)
2015	→ Jeonnam Dragons (loan)	21	(2)
2016–	Jeju United	240	(28)
2023–2025	→ Geoje Citizen (loan)	16	(4)

International career^{‡}
2010	South Korea U-17	3	(0)
2011–2013	South Korea U-20	12	(0)
2014–2016	South Korea U-23	24	(4)
2017–	South Korea	7	(1)
- * Club domestic league appearances and goals as of 3 August 2026 ‡ National team caps and goals as of 27 March 2018

- Lee Chang-min
- Hangul: 이창민
- Hanja: 李昌敏
- RR: I Changmin
- MR: I Ch'angmin

Lee Chang-Min (Korean: 이창민; born 20 January 1994) is a South Korean footballer who plays as a central midfielder for Jeju United.

== Career ==
He joined Gyeongnam FC on loan right after signed with Bucheon FC in 2014. In June 2023, Lee started his 21–month military service, during this time he will play for K League 4 side Geoje Citizen FC.

== Club statistics ==
As of 12 October 2023

Appearances and goals by club, season and competition
Club	Season	League	League		FA Cup		Playoffs		Continental		Total	
Club	Season	League	Apps	Goals	Apps	Goals	Apps	Goals	Apps	Goals	Apps	Goals
Gyeongnam FC (loan)	2014	K League 1	32	2	0	0	2	0	—		34	2
Jeonnam Dragons (loan)	2015	K League 1	21	2	2	0	—		—		23	2
Jeju United	2016	K League 1	21	2	1	0	—		—		22	2
Jeju United	2017	K League 1	26	5	1	0	—		8	3	35	8
Jeju United	2018	K League 1	23	3	1	0	—		5	2	29	5
Jeju United	2019	K League 1	32	5	1	0	—		—		33	5
Jeju United	2020	K League 2	24	4	3	0	—		—		27	4
Jeju United	2021	K League 1	34	4	1	0	—		—		35	4
Jeju United	2022	K League 1	31	3	1	1	—		—		32	4
Jeju United	2023	K League 1	13	0	1	0	—		—		14	0
Career Total			244	30	11	1	2	0	13	5	270	34

=== International goals ===
Scores and results list South Korea's goal tally first.

No	Date	Venue	Opponent	Score	Result	Competition
1.	27 March 2018	Silesian Stadium, Chorzów, Poland	Poland	1–2	2–3	Friendly

== Honours ==
=== International ===
South Korea U-20

- AFC U-19 Championship: 2012

South Korea U-23

- King's Cup: 2015

South Korea

- EAFF East Asian Cup : 2017

=== Individual ===
- K League 1 Best XI: 2017
