= Wesley (footballer, born 1981) =

Brazilian footballer

Personal information
- Full name: Wesley Barbosa de Morais
- Date of birth: 10 November 1981 (age 44)
- Place of birth: São Paulo, Brazil
- Height: 1.75 m (5 ft 9 in)
- Position: Forward

Senior career*
Years	Team	Apps	(Gls)
2002–2004	Barretos Esporte Clube		
2004–2006	Itumbiara		
2006–2008	Rio Preto		
2008–2010	Mirassol		
2009	→ Chunnam Dragons (loan)	20	(3)
2010	→ Grêmio Barueri (loan)	26	(9)
2011–2012	Atlético Mineiro	8	(1)
2012	→ Atlético Goianiense (loan)	19	(2)
2013	→ Gangwon FC (loan)	32	(2)
2014	Figueirense		
- * Club domestic league appearances and goals

Wesley Barbosa De Morais (born 10 November 1981), known simply as Wesley, is a Brazilian former professional footballer who played as a forward.

== Career statistics ==
(Correct as of May 22, 2011)

Club	Season	State League		Brazilian Série A		Copa do Brasil		Copa Libertadores		Copa Sudamericana		Total	
Club	Season	Apps	Goals	Apps	Goals	Apps	Goals	Apps	Goals	Apps	Goals	Apps	Goals
Grêmio Prudente	2010	17	4	26	9	-	-	-	-	2	0	45	13
