= Bae Hyo-sung =

South Korean footballer

Personal information
- Date of birth: 1 January 1982 (age 44)
- Place of birth: Taebaek, Gangwon, South Korea
- Height: 1.83 m (6 ft 0 in)
- Position: Defender

Youth career
- 1997–1999: Wonju Technical High School
- 2000–2003: Catholic Kwandong University

Senior career*
Years	Team	Apps	(Gls)
2004–2010	Busan I'Park	80	(1)
2009–2010	→ Gwangju Sangmu (army)	45	(0)
2011	Incheon United	29	(1)
2012–2014	Gangwon FC	88	(8)
2015	Gyeongnam FC	22	(0)
2016	Chungju Hummel	19	(0)
Total		283	(10)
Korean name
Hangul	배효성
Hanja	裵曉星
RR	Bae Hyoseong
MR	Pae Hyosŏng
- * Club domestic league appearances and goals

Bae Hyo-sung (Korean: 배효성; born 1 January 1982) is a South Korean former footballer who played as a defender.

== Club career ==
He began his professional career with Busan I'Park in 2004. In February 2011, he moved from Busan to Incheon United as soon as he left the army-based team Gwangju Sangmu. Although being a newly arriving player, coach Huh Jung-moo named him as team captain for 2011 season. On 14 November 2011, he left Incheon for his hometown team Gangwon FC.

=== Career statistics ===
As of 5 November 2011

Club performance			League		Cup		League Cup		Continental		Total	
Season	Club	League	Apps	Goals	Apps	Goals	Apps	Goals	Apps	Goals	Apps	Goals
Korea Republic			League		FA Cup		League Cup		Asia		Total	
2004	Busan I'cons / Busan I'Park	K-League	3	0	5	0	9	0	-		17	0
2005	Busan I'cons / Busan I'Park	K-League	22	0	1	0	12	0		1		1
2006	Busan I'cons / Busan I'Park	K-League	25	1	2	0	13	0	-		40	1
2007	Busan I'cons / Busan I'Park	K-League	21	0	2	0	8	0	-		31	0
2008	Busan I'cons / Busan I'Park	K-League	9	0	0	0	3	0	-		12	0
2009	Gwangju Sangmu	K-League	23	0	2	1	2	0	-		27	1
2010	Gwangju Sangmu	K-League	22	0	2	0	4	0	-		28	0
2011	Incheon United	K-League	29	1	2	0	2	0	-		33	1
2012	Gangwon FC	K-League					-		-			
Total			154	2	16	1	53	0		1		4

Sporting positions
Preceded by Chun Jae-ho	Incheon United captain 2011	Succeeded by Jung In-whan
