= César Arias =

Colombian footballer (born 1988)

Personal information
- Full name: César Augusto Arias Moros
- Date of birth: 2 April 1988 (age 38)
- Place of birth: Barrancabermeja, Colombia
- Height: 1.75 m (5 ft 9 in)
- Positions: Striker; attacking midfielder

Team information
- Current team: Alianza Petrolera

Youth career
- 2004–2005: Asociación Deportiva Belén

Senior career*
Years	Team	Apps	(Gls)
2006–2008	→ Alianza Petrolera (loan)	48	(12)
2009–2011	Cúcuta Deportivo	87	(11)
2011	Deportes Tolima	7	(0)
2012	Real Cartagena	30	(9)
2013–2017	Once Caldas	69	(6)
2013	→ Daejeon Citizen (loan)	14	(6)
2017–	Alianza Petrolera	68	(24)

International career
2010	Colombia	1	(0)
- * Club domestic league appearances and goals as of 8 April 2017

César Augusto Arias Moros (Note: In this Spanish name, the first or paternal surname is Arias and the second or maternal family name is Moros.) (born 2 April 1988), known as César Arias, is a Colombian football striker who plays for Alianza Petrolera.

== Club career ==
César Arias began his career with Asociación Deportiva Belén before joining Alianza Petrolera in 2006. Arias was slowly integrated into the first team with Alianza but by 2008 became an integral member of the squad, and was one of the top scorers for the club in the Copa Premier II de Fútbol de Ascenso.

With Alianza Petrolera, Arias faced Cúcuta in a Copa Colombia 2008 match and impressed directors of Cúcuta who promptly signed him. He made his debut for Cúcuta during the 2009 season. In his first season with Cúcuta he appeared in 36 league matches and scored 6 goals, playing primarily as an attacking midfielder.

== International career ==
After impressing with Cúcuta Arias was called up by Colombia in August 2010. He made his international debut for Colombia on 11 August 2010, in a 1–1 draw with Bolivia played at La Paz.
