= 2013 K League Classic =

31st season of top-tier football league in South Korea

Hyundai Oilbank K League Classic
- Season: 2013
- Dates: 2 March – 1 December 2013
- Champions: Pohang Steelers (5th title)
- Relegated: Daejeon Citizen; Daegu FC; Gangwon FC
- Champions League: Pohang Steelers; Ulsan Hyundai; Jeonbuk Hyundai Motors; FC Seoul
- Matches: 266
- Goals: 676 (2.54 per match)
- Best Player: Kim Shin-wook
- Top goalscorer: Dejan Damjanović; Kim Shin-wook (19 goals each)
- Biggest home win: Gyeongnam 6–0 Daejeon (23 June 2013)
- Biggest away win: Gangwon 0–4 Jeju (10 August 2013)
- Highest scoring: Suwon 5–4 Jeonbuk (26 June 2013)
- Longest winning run: 7 matches FC Seoul (7 July – 15 August 2013)
- Longest unbeaten run: 13 matches FC Seoul (7 July – 6 October 2013)
- Longest winless run: 19 matches Daejeon Citizen (7 April – 15 August 2013)
- Longest losing run: 8 matches Gangwon FC (16 July – 1 September 2013)
- Highest attendance: 43,681; Seoul 2–1 Suwon (3 August 2013)
- Lowest attendance: 749; Seongnam 0–1 Jeonnam (1 September 2013)
- Average attendance: 7,652

The 2013 K League Classic was the 31st season of the top division of South Korean professional football. The South Korean professional football league, K League, was split into two divisions since this year, and the top division was named the "K League Classic". Its fixtures were announced on 30 January, and began on 2 March.

== Teams ==
Locations of the 2013 K League Classic clubs

=== General information ===
Club	City	Manager	Stadium
Busan IPark	Busan	(South Korea) Yoon Sung-hyo	Busan Asiad Stadium
Jeonnam Dragons	Gwangyang	(South Korea) Ha Seok-ju	Gwangyang Football Stadium
Daegu FC	Daegu	(South Korea) Baek Jong-chul	Daegu Stadium
Daejeon Citizen	Daejeon	(South Korea) Kim In-wan	Daejeon World Cup Stadium
Gangwon FC	Gangneung	(South Korea) Kim Yong-kab	Gangneung Stadium
Gyeongnam FC	Changwon	(Serbia) Ilija Petković	Changwon Football Center
Incheon United	Incheon	(South Korea) Kim Bong-gil	Incheon Football Stadium
Jeju United	Seogwipo	(South Korea) Park Kyung-hoon	Jeju World Cup Stadium
Jeonbuk Hyundai Motors	Jeonju	(South Korea) Choi Kang-hee	Jeonju World Cup Stadium
Pohang Steelers	Pohang	(South Korea) Hwang Sun-hong	Pohang Steel Yard
Seongnam Ilhwa Chunma	Seongnam	(South Korea) An Ik-soo	Tancheon Sports Complex
FC Seoul	Seoul	(South Korea) Choi Yong-soo	Seoul World Cup Stadium
Suwon Samsung Bluewings	Suwon	(South Korea) Seo Jung-won	Suwon World Cup Stadium
Ulsan Hyundai	Ulsan	(South Korea) Kim Ho-kon	Ulsan Munsu Football Stadium

=== Managerial changes ===
Team	Outgoing	Manner	Date	Incoming	Date	Table
Daegu FC	(Brazil) Moacir Pereira	End of contract	2 December 2012	(South Korea) Dang Seong-jeung	2 December 2012	Pre-season
Daejeon Citizen	(South Korea) Yoo Sang-chul	End of contract	2 December 2012	(South Korea) Kim In-wan	2 December 2012	Pre-season
Seongnam Ilhwa Chunma	(South Korea) Shin Tae-yong	Resigned	11 December 2012	(South Korea) An Ik-soo	13 December 2012	Pre-season
Jeonbuk Hyundai Motors	(South Korea) Lee Heung-sil (caretaker)	Resigned	11 December 2012	(Brazil) Fabio Lefundes (caretaker)	20 December 2012	Pre-season
Suwon Samsung Bluewings	(South Korea) Yoon Sung-hyo	Resigned	12 December 2012	(South Korea) Seo Jung-won	12 December 2012	Pre-season
Busan IPark	(South Korea) An Ik-soo	Signed for Seongnam	13 December 2012	(South Korea) Yoon Sung-hyo	17 December 2012	Pre-season
Daegu FC	(South Korea) Dang Seong-jeung	Resigned	23 April 2013	(South Korea) Baek Jong-chul	23 April 2013	14th
Gyeongnam FC	(South Korea) Choi Jin-han	Resigned	22 May 2013	(South Korea) Song Kwang-hwan (caretaker)	22 May 2013	11th
Gyeongnam FC	(South Korea) Song Kwang-hwan (caretaker)	Resigned	29 May 2013	(Serbia) Ilija Petković	29 May 2013	11th
Jeonbuk Hyundai Motors	(Brazil) Fabio Lefundes (caretaker)	End of contract	28 June 2013	(South Korea) Choi Kang-hee	28 June 2013	7th
Gangwon FC	(South Korea) Kim Hak-bum	Sacked	10 August 2013	(South Korea) Kim Yong-kab	14 August 2013	13th

=== Foreign players ===
Restricting the number of foreign players strictly to four per team, including a slot for a player from AFC countries. A team could use four foreign players on the field each game including a least one player from the AFC country.

Club	Player 1	Player 2	Player 3	AFC player	Former player(s)
Busan IPark	(Brazil) Fágner	(Brazil) William	(Brazil) Rodrigo		
Jeonnam Dragons	(Brazil) Weslley			(Australia) Robert Cornthwaite	(Brazil) Marcinho (Australia) Matt Simon
Daegu FC	(Brazil) Leandrinho	(Brazil) Sandro	(Ghana) Derek Asamoah		(Brazil) Adriano Pardal (Brazil) Fábio Santos
Daejeon Citizen	(Brazil) João Paulo	(Colombia) Cesar Arias	(Colombia) Anderson Plata	(Japan) Yuta Baba	(Belgium) Karel De Smet (Brazil) Lúcio Flávio
Gangwon FC	(Brazil) Wesley	(Romania) Ianis Zicu		(Australia) Brendan Hamill	(Brazil) Patrik Silva (Russia) Denis Laktionov
Gyeongnam FC	(Serbia) Miloš Bosančić	(Serbia) Sreten Sretenović	(Serbia) Milan Bubalo	(Australia) Luke DeVere	
Incheon United	(Brazil) Diogo Acosta	(Brazil) Thiago Elias			(Australia) Nathan Burns
Jeju United	(Brazil) Pedro Júnior	(Brazil) Maranhão	(Brazil) Rodriguinho	(Australia) Adrian Madaschi	(Brazil) Waldison
Jeonbuk Hyundai Motors	(Belgium) Kevin Oris	(Brazil) Leonardo	(Brazil) Thiago Potiguar	(Australia) Alex Wilkinson	(Brazil) Eninho
Pohang Steelers					
Seongnam Ilhwa Chunma	(Brazil) Edcarlos	(Montenegro) Ivan Vuković	(Uruguay) Federico Laens	(Uzbekistan) Server Djeparov	(Colombia) Javier Reina (Colombia) Wilmar Jordán
FC Seoul	(Brazil) Adilson	(Colombia) Mauricio Molina	(Montenegro) Dejan Damjanović	(Japan) Sergio Escudero	
Suwon Samsung Bluewings	(Brazil) Júnior Santos			(North Korea) ~~Jong Tae-se~~ (Note: North Korean player could be deemed as a native player by South Korean law and passport.)	(Brazil) Rodrigo Pimpão (Montenegro) Dženan Radončić (North Macedonia) Stevica Ristić (Australia) Eddy Bosnar
Ulsan Hyundai	(Brazil) Caíque	(Brazil) Rafinha	(Brazil) Roberto César	(Japan) Chikashi Masuda	

== League table ==
Pos	Team	Pld	W	D	L	GF	GA	GD	Pts	Qualification or relegation
1	Pohang Steelers (C)	38	21	11	6	63	38	+25	74	Qualification for Champions League (Note: Pohang Steelers won the league after qualifying for the Champions League as champions of the FA Cup. Therefore, the spot given to the league champions was passed to the fourth-placed team.)
2	Ulsan Hyundai	38	22	7	9	63	37	+26	73	Qualification for Champions League
3	Jeonbuk Hyundai Motors	38	18	9	11	61	49	+12	63	Qualification for Champions League
4	FC Seoul	38	17	11	10	59	46	+13	62	Qualification for Champions League
5	Suwon Samsung Bluewings	38	15	8	15	50	43	+7	53	
6	Busan IPark	38	14	10	14	43	41	+2	52	
7	Incheon United	38	12	14	12	48	46	+2	50	
8	Seongnam Ilhwa Chunma	38	17	9	12	51	42	+9	60	
9	Jeju United	38	16	10	12	51	46	+5	58	
10	Jeonnam Dragons	38	9	13	16	34	45	−11	40	
11	Gyeongnam FC	38	8	13	17	42	55	−13	37	
12	Gangwon FC (R)	38	8	12	18	37	64	−27	36	Qualification for relegation play-offs
13	Daegu FC (R)	38	6	14	18	38	57	−19	32	Relegation to K League Challenge
14	Daejeon Citizen (R)	38	7	11	20	37	68	−31	32	Relegation to K League Challenge

Source: K League
Rules for classification: 1) Points; 2) Goal difference; 3) Goals scored
(C) Champions; (R) Relegated

== Positions by matchday ==
Leaders
Qualification for Champions League
Qualification for relegation play-offs
Relegation to K League Challenge

=== Round 1–26 ===
Team ╲ Round	1	2	3	4	5	6	7	8	9	10	11	12	13	14	15	16	17	18	19	20	21	22	23	24	25	26
Pohang Steelers	5	3	1	1	2	2	1	1	1	1	1	1	1	1	1	1	1	2	2	2	1	1	1	1	1	1
Ulsan Hyundai	2	7	4	2	3	5	2	4	4	7	4	3	2	2	2	2	2	1	1	1	2	2	2	3	2	2
Jeonbuk Hyundai Motors	1	1	2	6	4	6	3	6	6	4	5	6	5	7	5	7	5	4	3	3	3	3	3	2	3	3
FC Seoul	5	8	11	11	10	12	12	10	9	10	8	9	9	8	9	9	9	7	6	6	4	4	4	4	4	4
Suwon Samsung Bluewings	2	2	5	3	1	1	4	2	3	2	3	5	7	5	6	4	6	5	5	5	6	5	6	5	6	5
Incheon United	9	4	3	5	5	4	5	3	2	5	6	4	3	4	3	3	4	3	4	4	5	6	5	6	5	6
Busan IPark	5	9	8	8	7	8	7	7	7	6	7	7	6	9	7	8	8	9	8	8	7	8	7	7	7	7
Seongnam Ilhwa Chunma	11	9	13	12	14	10	9	8	8	8	11	8	8	6	8	5	7	8	9	9	9	9	9	8	8	8
Jeju United	4	5	6	4	6	3	6	5	5	3	2	2	4	3	4	6	3	6	7	7	8	7	8	9	9	9
Jeonnam Dragons	13	13	12	14	13	9	10	11	11	9	10	10	10	11	10	10	10	10	11	10	10	10	10	10	10	10
Gyeongnam FC	9	6	7	7	8	7	8	9	10	11	9	11	11	10	11	11	11	11	10	11	11	11	11	11	11	11
Daegu FC	11	9	9	10	11	13	13	14	13	14	14	14	14	13	13	13	13	13	12	12	12	12	12	12	12	12
Gangwon FC	5	9	9	13	12	14	14	13	14	13	12	12	12	12	12	12	12	12	13	13	13	13	13	13	13	13
Daejeon Citizen	14	14	14	9	9	11	11	12	12	12	13	13	13	14	14	14	14	14	14	14	14	14	14	14	14	14

Source: K League

=== Round 27–40 ===
Team ╲ Round	27	28	29	30	31	32	33	34	35	36	37	38	39	40
Pohang Steelers	1	1	1	1	2	2	2	2	2	2	2	2	2	1
Ulsan Hyundai	2	2	2	3	1	1	1	1	1	1	1	1	1	2
Jeonbuk Hyundai Motors	3	4	3	2	3	3	3	3	3	3	3	3	3	3
FC Seoul	4	3	4	4	4	4	4	4	4	4	4	4	4	4
Suwon Samsung Bluewings	5	5	5	5	5	5	5	5	5	5	5	5	5	5
Busan IPark	7	7	7	7	7	7	7	7	7	7	6	6	6	6
Incheon United	6	6	6	6	6	6	6	6	6	6	7	7	7	7
Seongnam Ilhwa Chunma	8	9	8	8	8	8	8	8	8	9	9	9	8	8
Jeju United	9	8	9	9	9	9	9	9	9	8	8	8	9	9
Jeonnam Dragons	10	10	10	10	10	10	10	10	10	10	10	10	10	10
Gyeongnam FC	11	11	11	11	11	11	11	11	11	11	11	11	11	11
Gangwon FC	13	13	13	13	13	13	13	12	12	12	12	12	12	12
Daegu FC	12	12	12	12	12	12	12	13	13	13	13	13	13	13
Daejeon Citizen	14	14	14	14	14	14	14	14	14	14	14	14	14	14

Source: K League

== Results ==
=== Matches 1–26 ===
Home \ Away	BIP	JND	DGU	DJC	GWN	GNM	ICU	JJU	JHM	PHS	SIC	SEO	SSB	USH
Busan IPark	—	2–1	1–0	1–1	2–2	5–1	0–3	1–2	1–2	2–2	2–0	1–0	2–1	1–0
Jeonnam Dragons	2–2	—	1–1	3–1	0–0	1–0	1–1	0–1	2–2	2–3	2–1	1–2	1–0	0–1
Daegu FC	0–1	1–1	—	1–1	0–0	3–2	1–3	1–1	0–1	0–1	0–0	0–1	0–2	5–3
Daejeon Citizen	0–0	1–2	1–3	—	2–0	1–1	0–1	1–1	1–3	0–1	0–2	1–2	1–4	0–3
Gangwon FC	2–2	1–1	0–0	1–1	—	1–1	1–2	0–4	1–3	0–3	2–1	0–1	2–1	1–2
Gyeongnam FC	1–0	0–1	3–1	6–0	1–1	—	1–0	2–4	1–1	1–1	0–1	0–0	0–3	0–1
Incheon United	0–1	0–0	2–1	1–2	1–0	0–0	—	0–0	3–1	2–1	1–4	2–3	3–1	2–2
Jeju United	1–0	0–0	1–1	2–1	4–0	2–1	1–1	—	0–3	2–3	1–1	4–4	1–2	3–1
Jeonbuk Hyundai Motors	1–4	1–0	2–0	1–1	4–1	4–0	2–0	2–1	—	1–1	2–3	1–0	1–2	2–1
Pohang Steelers	1–2	2–1	4–2	3–0	4–0	0–0	1–1	1–0	0–2	—	1–0	1–0	1–0	1–2
Seongnam Ilhwa Chunma	1–0	0–0	0–1	2–2	2–0	2–0	1–3	2–2	2–1	2–2	—	2–1	1–2	3–1
FC Seoul	1–0	3–0	4–0	3–2	3–2	2–2	2–3	1–0	1–1	2–2	3–0	—	2–1	2–2
Suwon Samsung Bluewings	2–0	0–0	3–1	3–1	1–0	0–0	1–0	1–2	5–4	0–2	2–2	1–1	—	0–0
Ulsan Hyundai	0–0	3–1	2–1	2–0	3–0	4–1	2–2	4–0	2–2	2–0	0–1	2–0	1–0	—

Source: K League
Legend: Blue = home team win; Yellow = draw; Red = away team win.

=== Matches 27–40 ===
==== Group A ====
Home \ Away	BIP	ICU	JHM	PHS	SEO	SSB	USH
Busan IPark	—	0–0	0–1	1–3	0–0	1–0	2–1
Incheon United	1–2	—	1–1	2–2	0–0	2–1	0–1
Jeonbuk Hyundai Motors	3–2	2–0	—	0–3	1–1	0–0	1–0
Pohang Steelers	0–0	2–1	2–1	—	3–1	2–2	1–1
FC Seoul	3–2	2–2	4–1	2–0	—	2–1	0–2
Suwon Samsung Bluewings	1–0	1–1	1–0	1–2	2–0	—	1–2
Ulsan Hyundai	1–0	2–1	2–0	0–1	1–0	2–1	—

Source: K League
Legend: Blue = home team win; Yellow = draw; Red = away team win.

==== Group B ====
Home \ Away	JND	DGU	DJC	GWN	GNM	JJU	SIC
Jeonnam Dragons	—	1–2	2–2	1–0	1–1	0–1	0–1
Daegu FC	0–1	—	1–1	1–1	0–0	0–1	2–2
Daejeon Citizen	2–0	3–2	—	1–3	0–1	1–2	1–0
Gangwon FC	2–1	2–2	1–3	—	2–1	3–0	0–2
Gyeongnam FC	4–2	3–0	1–1	1–2	—	1–2	1–2
Jeju United	1–0	1–2	0–1	1–1	0–1	—	1–0
Seongnam Ilhwa Chunma	0–1	0–0	3–1	1–2	2–1	2–1	—

Source: K League
Legend: Blue = home team win; Yellow = draw; Red = away team win.

== Relegation play-offs ==
4 December 2013
19:00

Sangju Sangmu	4–1	Gangwon FC
Lee Sang-hyup 29', 89'; Lee Seung-hyun 71'; Lee Sang-ho 77'		Choi Seung-in 90+2'

Sangju Civic Stadium

7 December 2013
14:00

Gangwon FC	1–0	Sangju Sangmu
Choi Seung-in 71'

Gangneung Stadium

Sangju Sangmu won 4–2 on aggregate and were promoted to the K League Classic, while Gangwon FC were relegated to the K League Challenge.

== Player statistics ==
=== Top scorers ===
Rank	Player	Club	Goals
1	(Montenegro) Dejan Damjanović	FC Seoul	19
1	(South Korea) Kim Shin-wook	Ulsan Hyundai	19
3	(Brazil) Pedro Júnior	Jeju United	17
4	(Belgium) Kevin Oris	Jeonbuk Hyundai Motors	14
4	(South Korea) Kim Dong-sub	Seongnam Ilhwa Chunma	14
6	(South Korea) Lee Dong-gook	Jeonbuk Hyundai Motors	13
7	(Brazil) Rafinha	Ulsan Hyundai	11
8	(North Korea) Jong Tae-se	Suwon Samsung Bluewings	10
9	(Serbia) Miloš Bosančić	Gyeongnam FC	9
9	(South Korea) Cho Chan-ho	Pohang Steelers	9
9	(South Korea) Lim Sang-hyub	Busan IPark	9
9	(Colombia) Mauricio Molina	FC Seoul	9

=== Top assist providers ===
Rank	Player	Club	Assists
1	(Colombia) Mauricio Molina	FC Seoul	13
1	(Brazil) Leonardo	Jeonbuk Hyundai Motors	13
3	(South Korea) Hong Chul	Suwon Samsung Bluewings	10
4	(South Korea) Han Sang-woon	Ulsan Hyundai	8
5	(South Korea) Hwang Jin-sung	Pohang Steelers	7
5	(Brazil) Maranhão	Jeju United	7
5	(Japan) Sergio Escudero	FC Seoul	7
8	(Brazil) Eninho	Jeonbuk Hyundai Motors	6
8	(South Korea) Kim Seung-dae	Pohang Steelers	6
8	(South Korea) Seo Dong-hyeon	Jeju United	6
8	(South Korea) Kang Seung-jo	Gyeongnam FC	6
8	(South Korea) Bae Il-hwan	Jeju United	6
8	(South Korea) Kim Shin-wook	Ulsan Hyundai	6

== Awards ==
The 2013 K League Awards was held on 3 December 2013.

=== Main awards ===
Award	Winner	Club
Most Valuable Player	(South Korea) Kim Shin-wook	Ulsan Hyundai
Top goalscorer	(Montenegro) Dejan Damjanović	FC Seoul
Top assist provider	(Colombia) Mauricio Molina	FC Seoul
Young Player of the Year	(South Korea) Ko Moo-yeol	Pohang Steelers
FANtastic Player	(South Korea) Kim Shin-wook	Ulsan Hyundai
Manager of the Year	(South Korea) Hwang Sun-hong	Pohang Steelers
Special Award	(South Korea) Kwon Jung-hyuk	Incheon United
Best Referee	(South Korea) Yoo Seon-ho	—
Best Assistant Referee	(South Korea) Son Jae-seon	—
Fair Play Award	FC Seoul	
Youth Team of the Year	Pohang Jecheol High School (Pohang Steelers)	

=== Best XI ===
Position	Winner	Club
Goalkeeper	(South Korea) Kim Seung-gyu	Ulsan Hyundai
Defenders	(Brazil) Adilson	FC Seoul
Defenders	(South Korea) Kim Chi-gon	Ulsan Hyundai
Defenders	(South Korea) Kim Won-il	Pohang Steelers
Defenders	(South Korea) Lee Yong	Ulsan Hyundai
Midfielders	(South Korea) Ko Moo-yeol	Pohang Steelers
Midfielders	(South Korea) Lee Myung-joo	Pohang Steelers
Midfielders	(South Korea) Ha Dae-sung	FC Seoul
Midfielders	(Brazil) Leonardo	Jeonbuk Hyundai Motors
Forwards	(South Korea) Kim Shin-wook	Ulsan Hyundai
Forwards	(Montenegro) Dejan Damjanović	FC Seoul

== Attendance ==
Pos	Team	Total	High	Low	Average	Change
1	Suwon Samsung Bluewings	336,068	37,879	4,861	17,689	−12.7%
2	FC Seoul	315,540	43,681	5,434	16,607	−19.0%
3	Jeonbuk Hyundai Motors	193,060	23,377	4,962	10,161	−0.8%
4	Pohang Steelers	184,301	17,228	2,274	9,700	+10.2%
5	Ulsan Hyundai	167,837	23,012	2,676	8,834	+17.8%
6	Incheon United	134,472	15,595	1,902	7,077	+81.7%
7	Daegu FC	130,251	39,871	978	6,855	−4.2%
8	Jeju United	122,813	18,751	1,274	6,464	−1.1%
9	Gyeongnam FC	113,257	16,286	1,789	5,961	+155.7%
10	Daejeon Citizen	107,675	27,775	1,126	5,667	+30.3%
11	Busan IPark	77,571	9,711	1,027	4,035	+0.6%
12	Gangwon FC	56,588	10,456	896	2,978	−3.5%
13	Seongnam Ilhwa Chunma	53,677	8,059	749	2,825	−3.2%
14	Jeonnam Dragons	43,273	7,036	872	2,278	−24.9%
	League total	2,036,413	43,681	749	7,656	+8.7%

Source: K League

== See also ==
- 2013 in South Korean football
- 2013 K League Challenge
- 2013 Korean FA Cup
