= Jung Seok-hwa =

South Korean footballer (born 1991)

Jung Seok-Hwa
Personal information
- Full name: Jung Seok-Hwa
- Date of birth: 17 May 1991 (age 35)
- Place of birth: South Korea
- Height: 1.71 m (5 ft 7 1/2 in)
- Position: Midfielder

Team information
- Current team: Cheonan City FC

Youth career
- 2010–2012: Korea University

Senior career*
Years	Team	Apps	(Gls)
2013–2017	Busan IPark	146	(8)
2018–2021	Gangwon FC	55	(2)
2021–2022	Seongnam FC	14	(0)
2022	FC Anyang	10	(2)
2023-	Cheonan City FC	53	(0)

International career
2012	South Korea U-23	6	(3)
- * Club domestic league appearances and goals as of 7 January 2026

Jung Seok-Hwa (Korean: 정석화; born 17 May 1991) is a South Korean footballer who plays as a winger for Cheonan City FC.

== Career ==
Jung signed with Busan IPark on 7 December 2012. He was a regular member of the IPark squad during his debut season, often playing as a central midfielder alongside Park Jong-woo. He scored his first goal for the club on 4 May 2014 against Gyeongnam, heading in from Park Joon-gang's cross.

Although able to play several roles in midfield, Jung became a regular on the wing for Busan due to his speed and dribbling ability. In the 2016 season, Jung registered ten assists, the joint highest in the division, and was named in the league's weekly Best XI on seven occasions.

Jung signed with K League 1 side Gangwon FC at the start of 2018 and was a regular for the club in his debut season. Having made a bright start to the 2019 season, he was ruled out for the remainder of the year with injury.

== Career statistics ==
As of 1 January 2021

Appearances and goals by club, season and competition
Club	Season	League			Cup		Play-offs		Total	
Club	Season	Division	Apps	Goals	Apps	Goals	Apps	Goals	Apps	Goals
Busan IPark	2013	K League 1	32	0	3	0	-	-	35	0
Busan IPark	2014	K League 1	26	1	2	0	-	-	28	1
Busan IPark	2015	K League 1	24	2	0	0	1	0	25	2
Busan IPark	2016	K League 2	40	4	2	0	0	0	42	4
Busan IPark	2017	K League 2	24	1	3	0	2	0	29	1
Gangwon FC	2018	K League 1	35	2	0	0	0	0	35	2
Gangwon FC	2019	K League 1	7	0	0	0	0	0	7	0
Gangwon FC	2020	K League 1	13	0	2	1	0	0	15	1
Career total			201	10	12	1	3	0	216	11
