= 2017 K League Challenge =

KEB Hana Bank K League Challenge
- Season: 2017
- Champions: Gyeongnam FC (1st title)
- Promoted: Gyeongnam FC
- Matches: 180
- Goals: 454 (2.52 per match)
- Best Player: Marcão
- Top goalscorer: Marcão (22 goals)
- Biggest home win: Bucheon 6–2 Anyang (19 June 2017)
- Biggest away win: Daejeon 1–4 Seongnam (27 August 2017); Anyang 1–4 Gyeongnam (2 September 2017)
- Highest scoring: Bucheon 6–2 Anyang (19 June 2017)
- Highest attendance: 10,683; Anyang 1–4 Gyeongnam (2 September 2017)
- Average attendance: 2,324

The 2017 K League Challenge was the fifth season of the K League 2, the second-highest division in the South Korean football league system. Champions and winners of the promotion playoffs could be promoted to the K League 1.

== Teams ==
=== Team changes ===
Relegated from K League Classic

- Suwon FC
- Seongnam FC

Promoted to K League Classic

- Daegu FC
- Gangwon FC

Newly joined

- Ansan Greeners

Withdrawn

- Goyang Zaicro
- Chungju Hummel

=== Locations ===
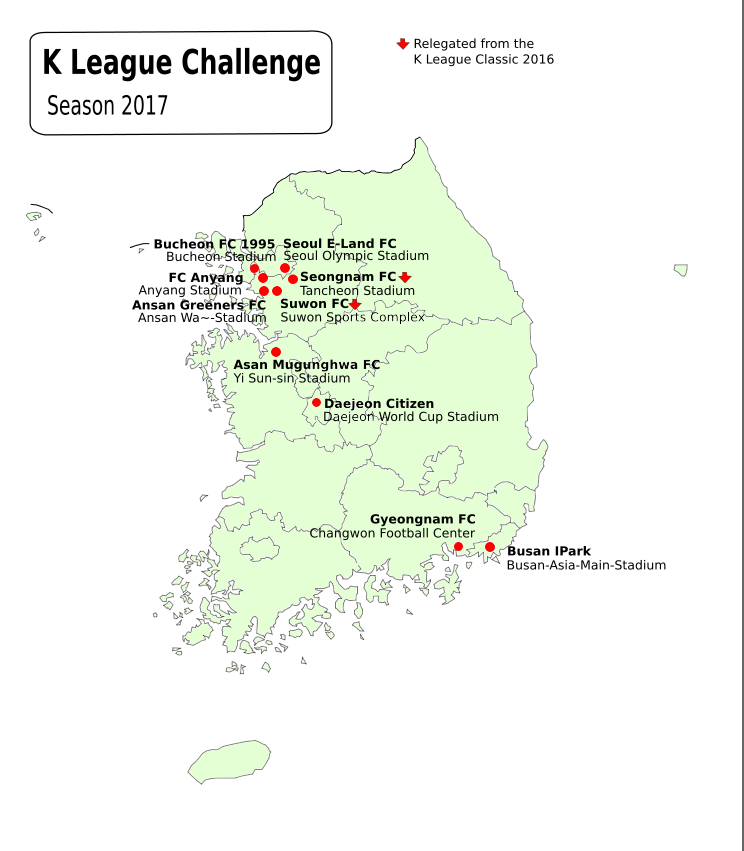
Locations of the 2017 K League Challenge clubs

=== Stadiums ===
Ansan Greeners	FC Anyang	Asan Mugunghwa	Bucheon FC 1995	Busan IPark
Ansan Wa~ Stadium	Anyang Stadium	Yi Sun-sin Stadium	Bucheon Stadium	Busan Gudeok Stadium
Capacity: 35,000	Capacity: 17,143	Capacity: 19,283	Capacity: 34,545	Capacity: 12,349
Daejeon Citizen	Gyeongnam FC	Seongnam FC	Seoul E-Land	Suwon FC
Daejeon World Cup Stadium	Changwon Football Center	Tancheon Stadium	Seoul Olympic Stadium	Suwon Sports Complex
Capacity: 40,535	Capacity: 15,500	Capacity: 16,146	Capacity: 69,950	Capacity: 11,808

=== Personnel and sponsoring ===
Note: Flags indicate national team as has been defined under FIFA eligibility rules. Players may hold more than one non-FIFA nationality.

Team	Managers	Kit manufacturer	Main sponsor
Ansan Greeners	(South Korea) Lee Heung-sil	Kelme	Ansan Government
FC Anyang	(South Korea) Kim Jong-pil	Astore	Anyang Government
Asan Mugunghwa	(South Korea) Song Sun-ho	Puma	Asan Government
Bucheon FC 1995	(South Korea) Jeong Gab-seok	Astore	Bucheon Government
Busan IPark	(South Korea) Cho Jin-ho	Adidas	Hyundai Development Company
Daejeon Citizen	(South Korea) Lee Young-ik	Astore	Daejeon Government
Gyeongnam FC	(South Korea) Kim Jong-boo	Hummel	Gyeongnam Government
Seongnam FC	(South Korea) Park Kyung-hoon	Umbro	Seongnam Government
Seoul E-Land	(South Korea) Kim Byung-soo	New Balance	E-Land
Suwon FC	(South Korea) Cho Duck-je	Hummel	Suwon Government

=== Foreign players ===
Restricting the number of foreign players strictly to four per team, including a slot for a player from AFC countries. A team could use four foreign players on the field each game.

Club	Player 1	Player 2	Player 3	Asian Player
Ansan Greeners	(Montenegro) Luka Rotković	(Uruguay) Raúl Tarragona		(Uzbekistan) Bahodir Nasimov
FC Anyang	(Brazil) Jô	(Brazil) Lukian	(Ivory Coast) Aubin Kouakou	
Bucheon FC 1995	(Brazil) Nilson Júnior	(Brazil) Waguininho	(Brazil) Rodrigo Paraná	(Uzbekistan) Bakhodir Pardayev
Busan IPark	(Brazil) Danny Morais	(Brazil) Rômulo	(Brazil) Léo Mineiro	(Japan) Michihiro Yasuda
Daejeon Citizen	(Brazil) Bruno Cantanhede	(Georgia (country)) Levan Shengelia	(Romania) Cristian Dănălache	
Gyeongnam FC	(Brazil) Alex Bruno	(Brazil) Marcão	(Croatia) Ivan Herceg	
Seongnam FC	(Brazil) Dário Júnior	(Croatia) Marin Oršulić	(Slovakia) Filip Hlohovský	
Seoul E-Land	(Brazil) Wesley Alex	(Brazil) Daniel Lovinho	(Japan) Tomoki Wada	(Japan) Atsuki Wada
Suwon FC	(Australia) Bruce Djite	(Brazil) Pedro Carmona	(Montenegro) Vladan Adžić	(Australia) Adrian Leijer

== League table ==
Pos	Team	Pld	W	D	L	GF	GA	GD	Pts	Qualification
1	Gyeongnam FC (C, P)	36	24	7	5	69	36	+33	79	Promotion to the K League 1
2	Busan IPark	36	19	11	6	52	30	+22	68	Qualification for the promotion playoffs semi-final
3	Asan Mugunghwa	36	15	9	12	44	37	+7	54	Qualification for the promotion playoffs first round
4	Seongnam FC	36	13	14	9	38	30	+8	53	Qualification for the promotion playoffs first round
5	Bucheon FC 1995	36	15	7	14	50	46	+4	52	
6	Suwon FC	36	11	12	13	42	48	−6	45	
7	FC Anyang	36	10	9	17	40	58	−18	39	
8	Seoul E-Land	36	7	14	15	42	55	−13	35	
9	Ansan Greeners	36	7	12	17	36	54	−18	33	
10	Daejeon Citizen	36	6	11	19	41	60	−19	29	

Source: K League
Rules for classification: 1) Points; 2) Goals scored; 3) Goal difference; 4) Wins; 5) Head-to-head points.
(C) Champions; (P) Promoted

== Positions by matchday ==
Leaders
Qualification for the promotion playoffs

=== Round 1–18 ===
Team ╲ Round	1	2	3	4	5	6	7	8	9	10	11	12	13	14	15	16	17	18
Gyeongnam FC	4	3	3	1	1	1	1	1	1	1	1	1	1	1	1	1	1	1
Busan IPark	4	1	2	4	2	2	2	2	2	2	2	2	2	2	2	2	2	2
Asan Mugunghwa	9	4	4	2	4	5	4	3	4	3	3	4	3	3	3	3	4	3
Bucheon FC 1995	1	6	7	5	5	3	3	4	5	4	4	3	4	5	5	4	3	4
Seongnam FC	9	8	8	10	10	10	10	10	9	10	9	9	7	7	7	6	5	5
Suwon FC	1	2	1	3	3	4	5	5	3	5	6	6	6	6	6	7	7	6
FC Anyang	6	10	10	8	7	7	6	6	6	6	5	5	4	4	4	5	6	7
Ansan Greeners	1	5	5	6	6	6	7	7	7	8	7	7	8	9	9	8	8	8
Seoul E-Land	6	9	9	9	9	9	9	9	10	7	8	8	9	8	8	9	9	9
Daejeon Citizen	6	7	6	7	8	8	8	8	8	9	10	10	10	10	10	10	10	10

Source: K League

=== Round 19–36 ===
Team ╲ Round	19	20	21	22	23	24	25	26	27	28	29	30	31	32	33	34	35	36
Gyeongnam FC	1	1	1	1	1	1	1	1	1	1	1	1	1	1	1	1	1	1
Busan IPark	2	2	2	2	2	2	2	2	2	2	2	2	2	2	2	2	2	2
Asan Mugunghwa	3	4	4	5	5	3	3	3	5	5	5	5	5	5	3	3	3	3
Seongnam FC	6	6	6	4	4	5	4	5	4	4	4	4	3	3	4	4	4	4
Bucheon FC 1995	4	3	3	3	3	4	5	4	3	3	3	3	4	4	5	5	5	5
Suwon FC	5	5	5	6	6	6	6	7	7	6	6	6	6	7	7	7	6	6
FC Anyang	7	7	7	7	7	7	7	6	6	7	7	7	7	6	6	6	7	7
Seoul E-Land	9	9	9	9	10	9	8	8	8	8	8	8	8	8	8	8	8	8
Ansan Greeners	8	8	8	8	8	8	9	9	9	9	9	9	9	9	9	9	9	9
Daejeon Citizen	10	10	10	10	9	10	10	10	10	10	10	10	10	10	10	10	10	10

Source: K League

== Results ==
=== Matches 1–18 ===
Home \ Away	ANS	ANY	ASM	BUC	BIP	DJC	GNM	SEN	SEL	SUW
Ansan Greeners	—	1–0	2–1	2–4	0–3	2–1	3–3	0–1	1–2	3–3
FC Anyang	2–1	—	0–2	3–1	0–1	3–2	1–2	2–0	2–0	1–2
Asan Mugunghwa	1–0	4–0	—	2–1	0–2	3–1	1–1	1–1	1–0	1–0
Bucheon FC 1995	2–0	6–2	1–2	—	1–0	1–1	2–2	0–2	2–1	0–1
Busan IPark	3–1	1–1	1–1	1–0	—	2–1	1–1	1–2	3–0	2–2
Daejeon Citizen	1–2	0–2	1–1	0–1	2–3	—	0–2	1–1	2–1	4–3
Gyeongnam FC	3–0	2–1	1–0	2–1	1–0	2–1	—	1–1	3–0	2–0
Seongnam FC	0–0	0–0	1–0	1–2	0–1	1–0	1–2	—	0–2	0–1
Seoul E-Land	1–0	2–2	1–1	4–1	2–3	3–3	0–1	0–0	—	0–0
Suwon FC	0–4	3–3	0–2	1–0	1–0	3–1	1–1	0–1	2–2	—

Source: K League
Legend: Blue = home team win; Yellow = draw; Red = away team win.

=== Matches 19–36 ===
Home \ Away	ANS	ANY	ASM	BUC	BIP	DJC	GNM	SEN	SEL	SUW
Ansan Greeners	—	2–2	0–1	0–2	0–1	1–1	1–0	1–1	1–1	0–0
FC Anyang	2–0	—	1–3	1–3	1–2	0–0	1–4	1–3	2–0	0–0
Asan Mugunghwa	0–0	2–0	—	1–1	0–1	1–2	2–3	0–2	2–0	2–1
Bucheon FC 1995	1–1	0–0	3–0	—	0–2	1–0	2–4	3–2	1–0	0–1
Busan IPark	3–0	0–0	1–1	1–0	—	4–2	1–2	0–0	2–1	2–2
Daejeon Citizen	1–1	2–0	1–1	0–1	0–0	—	2–1	1–4	0–1	2–0
Gyeongnam FC	3–1	0–1	3–1	2–1	2–0	4–2	—	1–0	2–1	2–2
Seongnam FC	1–0	1–0	1–0	1–1	1–1	1–1	1–3	—	2–2	3–0
Seoul E-Land	3–3	2–3	3–2	2–2	2–2	0–0	1–0	1–1	—	0–0
Suwon FC	0–2	4–0	0–1	1–2	0–1	3–2	2–1	0–0	3–1	—

Source: K League
Legend: Blue = home team win; Yellow = draw; Red = away team win.

== Promotion playoffs ==
=== Bracket ===
First round
3	Asan Mugunghwa	1
4	Seongnam FC	0

Semi-final
2	Busan IPark	3
3	Asan Mugunghwa	0

Final
Busan IPark	0	1	1 (4)
Sangju Sangmu (p)	1	0	1 (5)

=== First round ===
15 November 2017
19:00 KST

Asan Mugunghwa	1–0	Seongnam FC
Jung Sung-min 65'	Report

Yi Sun-sin Stadium, Asan
Attendance: 3,840
Referee: Kim Jong-hyeok

=== Semi-final ===
18 November 2017
15:00 KST

Busan IPark	3–0	Asan Mugunghwa
Lee Jung-hyup 32'; Lee Dong-jun 81', 90+4'	Report

Busan Gudeok Stadium, Busan
Attendance: 2,710
Referee: Kim Dong-jin

=== Final ===
The promotion-relegation playoffs were held between the winners of the 2017 K League Challenge playoffs and the 11th-placed club of the 2017 K League Classic. The winner on aggregate score after both matches earned entry into the 2018 K League 1.

22 November 2017
19:00 KST

Busan IPark	0–1	Sangju Sangmu
	Report	Yeo Reum 7'

Busan Gudeok Stadium, Busan
Attendance: 1,322
Referee: Lee Dong-jun

26 November 2017
15:00 KST

Sangju Sangmu	0–1 (a.e.t.)	Busan IPark
	Report	Rômulo 16' (pen.)
Penalties
Yeo Reum (penalty scored); Sin Jin-ho (penalty scored); Lim Chae-min (penalty scored); Kim Ho-nam (penalty scored); Joo Min-kyu (penalty scored)	5–4	(penalty scored) Rômulo; (penalty scored) Léo Mineiro; (penalty scored) Lee Dong-jun; (penalty missed) Ko Kyung-min; (penalty scored) Lim You-hwan

Sangju Civic Stadium, Sangju
Attendance: 2,714
Referee: Kim Seong-ho

1–1 on aggregate. Sangju Sangmu won 5–4 on penalties and therefore both clubs remain in their respective leagues.

== Player statistics ==
=== Top scorers ===
Rank	Player	Club	Goals
1	(Brazil) Marcão	Gyeongnam FC	22
2	(Uruguay) Raúl Tarragona	Ansan Greeners	15
3	(Brazil) Waguininho	Bucheon FC 1995	12
4	(South Korea) Jung Won-jin	Gyeongnam FC	10
5	(South Korea) Ko Kyung-min	Busan IPark	9
5	(South Korea) Lee Jeong-hyeop	Busan IPark	9
5	(Romania) Cristian Dănălache	Daejeon Citizen	9
5	(South Korea) Park Sung-ho	Seongnam FC	9
5	(South Korea) Jin Chang-soo	Bucheon FC 1995	9
10	(South Korea) Baek Sung-dong	Suwon FC	8
10	(South Korea) Jeong Jae-hee	FC Anyang	8

=== Top assist providers ===
Rank	Player	Club	Assists
1	(South Korea) Chang Hyuk-jin	Ansan Greeners	13
2	(South Korea) Jung Won-jin	Gyeongnam FC	10
3	(Brazil) Alex Bruno	Gyeongnam FC	8
3	(South Korea) Kim Shin	Bucheon FC 1995	8
5	(Japan) Atsuki Wada	Seoul E-Land FC	7
6	(Brazil) Rômulo	Busan IPark	6
6	(South Korea) Lee Ho-seok	Daejeon Citizen	6
6	(South Korea) Kim Shin	Bucheon FC 1995	6
9	(South Korea) Kim Bong-rae	Suwon FC	5
9	(South Korea) Lee Ju-yong	Asan Mugunghwa	5
9	(South Korea) Jeong Jae-hee	FC Anyang	5

== Attendance ==
Attendants who entered with free ticket were not counted.

Pos	Team	Total	High	Low	Average	Change
1	FC Anyang	60,078	10,683	1,360	3,338	+82.7%
2	Seongnam FC	50,427	6,700	1,410	2,802	−58.4%^{†}
3	Ansan Greeners	48,635	8,405	915	2,702	n/a
4	Busan IPark	43,302	6,337	1,024	2,406	+56.8%
5	Gyeongnam FC	39,273	7,278	713	2,182	+81.8%
6	Daejeon Citizen	38,787	5,136	1,032	2,155	−15.2%
7	Suwon FC	38,655	8,455	711	2,148	−51.0%^{†}
8	Asan Mugunghwa	35,188	7,933	726	1,955	+94.5%
9	Bucheon FC 1995	35,047	7,209	0	1,947	−6.4%
10	Seoul E-Land	28,996	4,531	631	1,611	+22.9%
	League total	418,388	10,683	0	2,324	+54.3%

Updated to games played on 29 October 2017
Source: K League Classic
Notes:
^{†} Team played previous season in K League Classic.

== Awards ==
The 2016 K League Awards was held on 20 November 2017.

=== Main awards ===
- Most Valuable Player: (Brazil) Marcão (Gyeongnam FC)
- Top goalscorer: (Brazil) Marcão (Gyeongnam FC)
- Top assist provider: (South Korea) Chang Hyuk-jin (Ansan Greeners)
- Manager of the Year: (South Korea) Kim Jong-boo (Gyeongnam FC)

=== Best XI ===
Position	Player	Club
Goalkeeper	(South Korea) Lee Bum-soo	Gyeongnam FC
Defenders	(South Korea) Choi Jae-soo	Gyeongnam FC
Defenders	(South Korea) Park Ji-soo	Gyeongnam FC
Defenders	(Croatia) Ivan Herceg	Gyeongnam FC
Defenders	(South Korea) Woo Joo-sung	Gyeongnam FC
Midfielders	(South Korea) Jung Won-jin	Gyeongnam FC
Midfielders	(South Korea) Hwang In-beom	Daejeon Citizen
Midfielders	(South Korea) Moon Ki-han	Bucheon FC 1995
Midfielders	(South Korea) Bae Ki-jong	Gyeongnam FC
Forwards	(Brazil) Marcão	Gyeongnam FC
Forwards	(South Korea) Lee Jeong-hyeop	Busan IPark

=== Player of the Round ===
Round	Player	Club
1	(South Korea) Lee Jung-hyup	Busan IPark
2	(South Korea) Heo Beom-san	Busan IPark
3	(South Korea) Kim Eun-sun	Asan Mugunghwa
4	(South Korea) Cho Seok-jae	FC Anyang
5	(South Korea) Kim Min-kyun	FC Anyang
6	(South Korea) Lee Jung-hyup	Busan IPark
7	(South Korea) Jeong Jae-hee	FC Anyang
8	(South Korea) Kim Min-kyun	FC Anyang
9	(South Korea) Lee Seung-hyun	Suwon FC
10	(South Korea) Kim Min-kyun	FC Anyang
11	(Uruguay) Raúl Tarragona	Ansan Greeners
12	(Brazil) Marcão	Gyeongnam FC
13	(Brazil) Marcão	Gyeongnam FC
14	(South Korea) Lim Sang-hyub	Busan IPark
15	(South Korea) Lee Kyu-seong	Busan IPark
16	(Romania) Cristian Dănălache	Daejeon Citizen
17	(South Korea) Kim Shin	Bucheon FC 1995
18	(Brazil) Danny Morais	Busan IPark

Round	Player	Club
19	(South Korea) Baek Sung-dong	Suwon FC
20	(South Korea) Lee Seung-hyun	Suwon FC
21	(South Korea) Go Myeong-seok	Bucheon FC 1995
22	(South Korea) Kim Dong-chan	Seongnam FC
23	(South Korea) Hwang In-beom	Daejeon Citizen
24	(South Korea) Jung Won-jin	Gyeongnam FC
25	(Brazil) Marcão	Gyeongnam FC
26	(South Korea) Choi Oh-baek	Seoul E-Land
27	(South Korea) Choi Oh-baek	Seoul E-Land
28	(South Korea) Ko Kyung-min	Busan IPark
29	(South Korea) Kim Chan-hee	Daejeon Citizen
30	(South Korea) Kim Hyun	Asan Mugunghwa
31	(Brazil) Marcão	Gyeongnam FC
32	(South Korea) Kim Kyeong-min	Busan IPark
33	(Brazil) Marcão	Gyeongnam FC
34	(South Korea) Ryu Won-woo	Bucheon FC 1995
35	(South Korea) Jeong Hyeon-cheol	Gyeongnam FC
36	(South Korea) Baek Sung-dong	Suwon FC

=== Manager of the Month ===
Month	Manager	Club	Division
March	(South Korea) Jo Sung-hwan	Jeju United	K League Classic
April	(South Korea) Kim Jong-boo	Gyeongnam FC	K League Challenge
May	(South Korea) Choi Yun-kyum	Gangwon FC	K League Classic
June	(South Korea) Choi Kang-hee	Jeonbuk Hyundai Motors	K League Classic
July	(South Korea) Seo Jung-won	Suwon Samsung Bluewings	K League Classic
August	(South Korea) Hwang Sun-hong	FC Seoul	K League Classic
September	(South Korea) Kim Do-hoon	Ulsan Hyundai	K League Classic
October	(Brazil) André	Daegu FC	K League Classic

== See also ==
- 2017 in South Korean football
- 2017 K League Classic
- 2017 Korean FA Cup
