= 2016 K League Challenge =

Hyundai Oilbank K League Challenge
- Season: 2016
- Champions: Ansan Mugunghwa (1st title)
- Promoted: Daegu FC; Gangwon FC
- Matches: 220
- Goals: 528 (2.4 per match)
- Best Player: Kim Dong-chan
- Top goalscorer: Kim Dong-chan (20 goals)
- Biggest home win: Gyeongnam 7–0 Goyang (7 September 2016); Chungju 8–1 Ansan (15 October 2016)
- Biggest away win: Chungju 0–4 Busan (10 July 2016); Goyang 0–4 Ansan (25 September 2016); Ansan 0–4 Gangwon (22 October 2016)
- Highest scoring: Chungju 8–1 Ansan (15 October 2016)
- Highest attendance: 23,015; Daegu 0–0 Gyeongnam (10 April 2016)
- Lowest attendance: 124; Goyang 2–3 Gyeongnam (16 October 2016)
- Average attendance: 1,506

The 2016 K League Challenge was the fourth season of the K League 2, the second-highest division in the South Korean football league system. Originally, K League Challenge champions could be promoted to the K League Classic, but Ansan Mugunghwa lost its qualification for the promotion after Ansan Government decided to break up with police football team from next year. Runners-up Daegu FC directly qualified for the Classic instead of champions Ansan Mugunghwa, and third, fourth and fifth-placed team advanced to the promotion playoffs.

== Teams ==
Locations of the 2016 K League Challenge clubs

=== Team changes ===
Relegated from K League Classic

- Daejeon Citizen
- Busan IPark

Promoted to K League Classic

- Sangju Sangmu
- Suwon FC

=== Stadiums ===
Ansan Mugunghwa	FC Anyang	Bucheon FC 1995
Ansan Wa~ Stadium	Anyang Stadium	Bucheon Stadium
Capacity: 35,000	Capacity: 17,143	Capacity: 34,545
Busan IPark	Chungju Hummel	Daegu FC
Busan Asiad Main Stadium	Chungju Stadium	Daegu Stadium
Capacity: 53,864	Capacity: 15,000	Capacity: 68,014
Daejeon Citizen	Gangwon FC	Goyang Zaicro
Daejeon World Cup Stadium	Gangneung Stadium	Goyang Stadium
Capacity: 40,535	Capacity: 22,333	Capacity: 41,311
Gyeongnam FC	Seoul E-Land	
Changwon Football Center	Seoul Olympic Stadium	
Capacity: 15,500	Capacity: 69,950	

=== Personnel and sponsoring ===
Note: Flags indicate national team as has been defined under FIFA eligibility rules. Players may hold more than one non-FIFA nationality.

Team	Managers	Kit manufacturer	Main sponsor
Ansan Mugunghwa	(South Korea) Lee Heung-sil	Zaicro	Ansan Government
FC Anyang	(South Korea) Lee Young-min	Astore	
Bucheon FC 1995	(South Korea) Song Sun-ho	Astore	Bucheon Government
Busan IPark	(South Korea) Choi Young-jun	Adidas	Hyundai Development Company
Chungju Hummel	(South Korea) Ahn Seung-in	Hummel	Chungju Government
Daegu FC	(South Korea) Lee Young-jin	Kelme	Daegu Government
Daejeon Citizen	(South Korea) Choi Moon-sik	Kelme	Daejeon Government
Gyeongnam FC	(South Korea) Kim Jong-boo	Hummel	DSME
Gangwon FC	(South Korea) Choi Yun-kyum	Astore	High1 Resort
Goyang Zaicro	(South Korea) Lee Nak-young	Zaicro	Zaicro
Seoul E-Land	(Scotland) Martin Rennie	New Balance	E-Land

=== Foreign players ===
Restricting the number of foreign players strictly to four per team, including a slot for a player from AFC countries. A team could use four foreign players on the field each game.

Club	Player 1	Player 2	Player 3	Asian Player
FC Anyang	(Brazil) Bruninho			
Bucheon FC 1995	(Brazil) Edson Paraíba	(Brazil) Lukian	(Brazil) Waguininho	
Busan IPark	(Brazil) Nilson Júnior	(Brazil) Willian Popp	(Serbia) Miloš Stojanović	
Chungju Hummel	(Ivory Coast) Aubin Kouakou	(Brazil) Malcon	(Brazil) Rafael Ratão	
Daegu FC	(Brazil) Wesley Alex	(Brazil) Cesinha	(Brazil) Paulo Sérgio	(Brazil) (Palestine) Éder Lima (Note: Éder Lima owned Palestinian citizenship and was counted as an Asian player in the K League.)
Daejeon Citizen	(Brazil) Gustavo Sauer	(Romania) Jean-Claude Bozga		
Gyeongnam FC	(Croatia) Ivan Herceg	(Romania) Cristian Dănălache	(Serbia) Ivan Marković	
Gangwon FC	(Brazil) Maranhão	(Brazil) Matheus Alves	(Brazil) Luiz Henrique	(Brazil) (Syria) Serginho
Goyang Zaicro	(Brazil) Felipe	(Brazil) Paulo Victor		
Seoul E-Land	(Brazil) Tarabai	(Trinidad and Tobago) Carlyle Mitchell		

== League table ==
Pos	Team	Pld	W	D	L	GF	GA	GD	Pts	Qualification
1	Ansan Mugunghwa (Note: Ansan Mugunghwa lost its qualification for the promotion after Ansan Government decided to break up with Korean Police Agency.) (C)	40	21	7	12	57	55	+2	70	
2	Daegu FC (P)	40	19	13	8	53	36	+17	70	Promotion to the K League Classic
3	Bucheon FC 1995	40	19	10	11	49	33	+16	67	Qualification for the promotion playoffs semi-final
4	Gangwon FC (O, P)	40	19	9	12	50	33	+17	66	Qualification for the promotion playoffs first round
5	Busan IPark	40	19	7	14	52	39	+13	64	Qualification for the promotion playoffs first round
6	Seoul E-Land	40	17	13	10	47	35	+12	64	
7	Daejeon Citizen	40	15	10	15	56	52	+4	55	
8	Gyeongnam FC (Note: Gyeongnam FC were deducted 10 points due to bribery scandal.)	40	18	6	16	61	58	+3	50	
9	FC Anyang	40	11	13	16	40	53	−13	46	
10	Chungju Hummel	40	7	8	25	42	62	−20	29	
11	Goyang Zaicro	40	2	10	28	21	72	−51	16	

Source: K League
Rules for classification: 1) Points; 2) Goals scored; 3) Goal difference; 4) Wins; 5) Head-to-head points.
(C) Champions; (O) Play-off winners; (P) Promoted

== Positions by matchday ==
Leaders
Qualification for the promotion playoffs

=== Round 1–22 ===
Team ╲ Round	1	2	3	4	5	6	7	8	9	10	11	12	13	14	15	16	17	18	19	20	21	22
Ansan Mugunghwa	1	1	1	2	1	1	1	1	1	1	1	1	2	2	1	1	2	1	1	1	1	1
Gangwon FC	9	9	6	4	3	3	2	2	2	3	4	2	1	1	2	2	1	2	3	3	2	2
Daegu FC	2	4	4	3	4	4	3	3	3	2	2	3	3	3	3	3	4	4	4	4	4	3
Bucheon FC 1995	7	6	7	7	5	5	4	4	4	4	3	4	4	4	4	4	3	3	2	2	3	4
Seoul E-Land	3	2	2	1	2	2	5	5	5	5	5	6	7	5	5	5	6	7	5	6	5	5
FC Anyang	3	3	5	6	7	7	8	8	8	8	8	8	8	6	7	6	5	6	6	7	7	6
Daejeon Citizen	10	10	10	10	10	9	7	7	7	7	7	7	6	8	8	7	7	5	7	5	6	7
Busan IPark	8	5	3	5	6	6	6	6	6	6	6	5	5	7	6	8	8	8	8	8	8	8
Gyeongnam FC	11	11	11	11	11	11	11	11	11	11	11	11	11	11	11	11	10	10	10	9	9	9
Chungju Hummel	3	7	8	8	8	8	9	10	10	10	10	10	9	9	9	9	9	9	9	10	10	10
Goyang Zaicro	3	7	9	9	9	10	10	9	9	9	9	9	10	10	10	10	11	11	11	11	11	11

Source: K League

=== Round 23–44 ===
Team ╲ Round	23	24	25	26	27	28	29	30	31	32	33	34	35	36	37	38	39	40	41	42	43	44
Ansan Mugunghwa	1	1	1	1	1	1	1	1	1	1	1	1	1	1	1	1	1	1	1	1	1	1
Daegu FC	3	3	2	3	3	2	4	4	3	3	3	4	3	3	3	4	2	3	2	2	2	2
Bucheon FC 1995	4	4	4	4	4	4	3	2	2	2	2	2	2	2	2	3	3	4	3	3	5	3
Gangwon FC	2	2	3	2	2	3	2	3	4	4	4	3	4	4	4	2	4	2	4	4	3	4
Busan IPark	8	9	9	9	9	8	9	9	7	7	8	6	5	5	5	5	5	5	5	5	4	5
Seoul E-Land	5	5	5	6	5	7	7	7	8	8	7	8	7	7	7	7	6	6	6	6	6	6
Daejeon Citizen	6	6	7	7	6	5	5	5	5	5	5	5	6	6	6	6	7	7	7	7	7	7
Gyeongnam FC	9	8	8	8	8	9	8	8	9	9	9	9	9	9	9	8	8	8	8	8	8	8
FC Anyang	7	7	6	5	7	6	6	6	6	6	6	7	8	8	8	9	9	9	9	9	9	9
Chungju Hummel	10	10	10	10	10	10	10	10	10	10	10	10	10	10	10	10	10	10	10	10	10	10
Goyang Zaicro	11	11	11	11	11	11	11	11	11	11	11	11	11	11	11	11	11	11	11	11	11	11

Source: K League

== Results ==
=== Matches 1–20 ===
Home \ Away	ASM	ANY	BUC	BIP	CJH	DGU	DJC	GWN	GYZ	GNM	SEL
Ansan Mugunghwa	—	2–1	0–0	1–1	2–1	0–2	2–1	3–1	1–0	5–0	1–0
FC Anyang	1–0	—	0–1	1–0	2–1	3–2	2–2	0–2	1–1	1–0	2–1
Bucheon FC 1995	3–1	1–1	—	1–1	0–1	0–0	3–1	3–1	1–0	1–0	0–1
Busan IPark	1–3	3–1	0–2	—	2–1	1–4	0–0	0–0	2–0	1–1	1–2
Chungju Hummel	1–2	1–0	0–1	0–4	—	0–1	1–1	1–2	2–3	1–3	3–1
Daegu FC	1–2	1–1	1–1	1–0	2–1	—	2–1	0–0	2–2	0–0	0–0
Daejeon Citizen	0–1	1–1	2–0	2–1	3–1	0–2	—	0–1	0–0	3–1	2–1
Gangwon FC	2–0	4–1	0–2	0–1	2–0	1–0	1–0	—	4–0	0–0	2–1
Goyang Zaicro	0–0	0–0	0–0	0–1	2–4	1–3	0–1	0–1	—	1–2	0–3
Gyeongnam FC	0–1	2–0	0–2	3–2	2–1	2–1	4–4	1–0	2–1	—	0–1
Seoul E-Land	0–0	0–0	2–1	1–0	0–0	1–1	2–0	1–1	1–1	2–1	—

Source: K League
Legend: Blue = home team win; Yellow = draw; Red = away team win.

=== Matches 21–40 ===
Home \ Away	ASM	ANY	BUC	BIP	CJH	DGU	DJC	GWN	GYZ	GNM	SEL
Ansan Mugunghwa	—	2–2	2–3	0–2	1–1	4–1	1–0	0–4	2–1	2–0	2–0
FC Anyang	2–3	—	2–2	0–1	0–0	0–1	1–0	0–0	3–2	1–2	3–1
Bucheon FC 1995	0–2	1–0	—	1–0	2–3	2–3	2–0	0–1	4–1	1–2	0–2
Busan IPark	4–0	2–0	2–1	—	0–0	0–2	3–0	2–1	2–0	2–3	1–1
Chungju Hummel	8–1	0–1	0–1	0–1	—	0–3	1–2	2–2	0–0	3–2	0–1
Daegu FC	2–2	1–1	0–0	0–1	1–0	—	1–0	1–3	1–0	1–2	0–1
Daejeon Citizen	5–0	3–2	0–0	2–1	2–2	1–1	—	1–0	3–0	3–1	2–3
Gangwon FC	1–0	3–0	0–1	1–2	2–1	1–1	1–2	—	0–0	1–1	1–0
Goyang Zaicro	0–4	0–1	0–3	0–1	1–0	0–1	1–2	0–1	—	2–3	0–2
Gyeongnam FC	1–2	2–0	0–1	1–3	2–0	1–2	4–3	2–0	7–0	—	1–1
Seoul E-Land	2–0	2–2	1–1	2–0	2–0	0–2	1–1	1–2	1–1	2–0	—

Source: K League
Legend: Blue = home team win; Yellow = draw; Red = away team win.

== Promotion playoffs ==
=== Bracket ===
First round
4	Gangwon FC	1
5	Busan IPark	0

Semi-final
3	Bucheon FC 1995	1
4	Gangwon FC	2

Final
Gangwon FC (a)	0	1	1
Seongnam FC	0	1	1

=== First round ===
2 November 2016
19:00 KST

Gangwon FC	1–0	Busan IPark
Matheus 89'	Report

Gangneung Stadium, Gangneung
Attendance: 925
Referee: Ko Hyung-jin

=== Semi-final ===
5 November 2016
14:00 KST

Bucheon FC 1995	1–2	Gangwon FC
Han Hee-hoon 50'	Report	Jung Seung-yong 17'; Maranhão 90+3'

Bucheon Stadium, Bucheon
Attendance: 3,121
Referee: Mae Ho-young

=== Final ===
The promotion-relegation playoffs were held between the winners of the 2016 K League Challenge playoffs and the 11th-placed club of the 2016 K League Classic. The winner on aggregate score after both matches earned entry into the 2017 K League Classic.

17 November 2016
19:00 KST

Gangwon FC	0–0	Seongnam FC
	Report

Gangneung Stadium, Gangneung
Attendance: 3,039
Referee: Kim Hee-gon

20 November 2016
15:00 KST

Seongnam FC	1–1	Gangwon FC
Hwang Jin-sung 77'		Han Seok-jong 42'

Tancheon Stadium, Seongnam
Attendance: 6,548
Referee: Kim Seong-ho

1–1 on aggregate. Gangwon FC won on away goals and were promoted to the K League Classic, while Seongnam FC were relegated to the K League Challenge.

== Player statistics ==
=== Top scorers ===
Rank	Player	Club	Goals
1	(South Korea) Kim Dong-chan	Daejeon Citizen	20
2	(Romania) Cristian Dănălache	Gyeongnam FC	19
3	(Brazil) Willian Popp	Busan IPark	18
4	(Brazil) Paulo Sérgio	Daegu FC	17
5	(Brazil) Lukian	Bucheon FC 1995	15
6	(South Korea) Joo Min-kyu	Seoul E-Land	14
7	(South Korea) Kim Shin	Chungju Hummel	13
8	(Brazil) Tarabai	Seoul E-Land	12
9	(Brazil) Matheus Alves	Gangwon FC	11
9	(Brazil) Cesinha	Daegu FC	11
9	(South Korea) Kim Min-kyun	FC Anyang	11

=== Top assist providers ===
Rank	Player	Club	Assists
1	(South Korea) Lee Ho-seok	Gyeongnam FC	10
1	(South Korea) Jung Seok-hwa	Busan IPark	10
3	(Brazil) Cesinha	Daegu FC	8
3	(South Korea) Kim Dong-chan	Daejeon Citizen	8
5	(South Korea) Moon Ki-han	Bucheon FC 1995	7
6	(Brazil) Gustavo Sauer	Daejeon Citizen	6
6	(South Korea) Song Soo-young	Gyeongnam FC	6
6	(South Korea) Kim Shin	Chungju Hummel	6
6	(South Korea) Jin Chang-soo	Bucheon FC 1995	6
6	(South Korea) Lee Hyun-seung	Ansan Mugunghwa	6
6	(South Korea) Han Ji-ho	Ansan Mugunghwa	6
6	(Romania) Cristian Dănălache	Gyeongnam FC	6

== Attendance ==
Attendants who entered with free ticket were not counted.

Pos	Team	Total	High	Low	Average	Change
1	Daegu FC	54,246	23,015	369	2,712	−10.4%
2	Daejeon Citizen	50,797	18,082	955	2,540	−23.9%^{†}
3	Bucheon FC 1995	41,619	10,982	713	2,081	+22.6%
4	FC Anyang	36,530	9,145	521	1,827	+7.5%
5	Busan IPark	30,670	6,075	508	1,534	−38.5%^{†}
6	Seoul E-Land	26,218	3,060	508	1,311	−28.2%
7	Gyeongnam FC	24,003	4,610	307	1,200	−36.6%
8	Gangwon FC	21,328	3,042	518	1,066	−21.4%
9	Ansan Mugunghwa	20,093	4,072	202	1,005	−39.6%
10	Chungju Hummel	18,871	3,118	388	944	−23.1%
11	Goyang Zaicro	7,054	897	124	353	−48.7%
	League total	331,429	23,015	124	1,506	−6.2%

Source: K League
Notes:
^{†} Team played previous season in K League Classic.

== Awards ==
=== Main awards ===
The 2016 K League Awards was held on 8 November 2016.

- Most Valuable Player: (South Korea) Kim Dong-chan (Daejeon Citizen)
- Top goalscorer: (South Korea) Kim Dong-chan (Daejeon Citizen)
- Top assist provider: (South Korea) Lee Ho-seok (Gyeongnam FC)
- Manager of the Year: (South Korea) Son Hyun-jun (Daegu FC)

=== Best XI ===
Position	Player	Club
Goalkeeper	(South Korea) Jo Hyeon-woo	Daegu FC
Defenders	(South Korea) Jeong Woo-jae	Daegu FC
Defenders	(South Korea) Hwang Jae-won	Daegu FC
Defenders	(South Korea) Lee Han-saem	Gangwon FC
Defenders	(South Korea) Jung Seung-yong	Gangwon FC
Midfielders	(Brazil) Waguininho	Bucheon FC 1995
Midfielders	(South Korea) Lee Hyun-seung	Ansan Mugunghwa
Midfielders	(South Korea) Hwang In-beom	Daejeon Citizen
Midfielders	(Brazil) Cesinha	Daegu FC
Forwards	(South Korea) Kim Dong-chan	Daejeon Citizen
Forwards	(Brazil) Willian Popp	Busan IPark

=== Player of the Round ===
Round	Player	Club
1	(South Korea) Lim Sun-young	Ansan Mugunghwa
2	(South Korea) Jung Jae-yong	FC Anyang
3	(South Korea) Jo Hyeon-woo	Daegu FC
4	(Brazil) Jonatas Belusso	Seoul E-Land
5	(South Korea) Shim Young-sung	Gangwon FC
6	(South Korea) Lee Young-chang	Chungju Hummel
7	(South Korea) Park Tae-hong	Daegu FC
8	(South Korea) Jo Hyeon-woo	Daegu FC
9	(Brazil) Willian Popp	Busan IPark
10	(Brazil) Lukian	Bucheon FC 1995
11	(South Korea) Jung Jae-yong	FC Anyang
12	(South Korea) Jung Jae-yong	FC Anyang
13	(South Korea) Park Ji-min	Chungju Hummel
14	(South Korea) Jung Seung-yong	Gangwon FC
15	(Palestine) Éder Lima	Daegu FC
16	(South Korea) Jang Baek-gyu	Chungju Hummel
17	(South Korea) Kim Min-kyun	FC Anyang
18	(Brazil) Wanderson	Daejeon Citizen
19	(South Korea) Jeong Woo-jae	Daegu FC
20	(Brazil) Gustavo Sauer	Daejeon Citizen
21	(Brazil) Cesinha	Daegu FC
22	(South Korea) Kim Min-kyun	FC Anyang

Round	Player	Club
23	(South Korea) Hwang In-beom	Daejeon Citizen
24	(South Korea) Song Soo-young	Gyeongnam FC
25	(Romania) Cristian Dănălache	Gyeongnam FC
26	(South Korea) Jung Sung-min	Ansan Mugunghwa
27	(South Korea) Joo Min-kyu	Seoul E-Land
28	(South Korea) Ko Kyung-min	Busan IPark
29	(South Korea) Jung Seung-yong	Gangwon FC
30	(South Korea) Kim Dong-chan	Daejeon Citizen
31	(Brazil) Wesley Alex	Daegu FC
32	(South Korea) Han Ji-ho	Ansan Mugunghwa
33	(Romania) Cristian Dănălache	Gyeongnam FC
34	(Ivory Coast) Aubin Kouakou	Chungju Hummel
35	(Brazil) Willian Popp	Busan IPark
36	(South Korea) Lee Ho-seok	Gyeongnam FC
37	(Brazil) Cesinha	Daegu FC
38	(Romania) Cristian Dănălache	Gyeongnam FC
39	(Brazil) Cesinha	Daegu FC
40	(South Korea) Joo Min-kyu	Seoul E-Land
41	(Romania) Cristian Dănălache	Gyeongnam FC
42	(South Korea) Hong Dong-hyun	Busan IPark
43	(South Korea) Jung Seok-hwa	Busan IPark
44	(Brazil) Cesinha	Daegu FC

=== Manager of the Month ===
Month	Manager	Club	Division
March/April	(South Korea) Choi Yong-soo	FC Seoul	K League Classic
May	(South Korea) Nam Ki-il	Gwangju FC	K League Classic
June	(South Korea) Lee Heung-sil	Ansan Mugunghwa	K League Challenge
July	(South Korea) Choi Kang-hee	Jeonbuk Hyundai Motors	K League Classic
August	(South Korea) Choi Young-jun	Busan IPark	K League Challenge
September	(South Korea) Choi Yun-kyum	Gangwon FC	K League Challenge
October	(South Korea) Hwang Sun-hong	FC Seoul	K League Classic

== See also ==
- 2016 in South Korean football
- 2016 K League Classic
- 2016 Korean FA Cup
