= 2015 K League Challenge =

Hyundai Oilbank K League Challenge
- Season: 2015
- Champions: Sangju Sangmu (2nd title)
- Promoted: Sangju Sangmu; Suwon FC
- Matches: 220
- Goals: 593 (2.7 per match)
- Best player: Johnathan
- Top goalscorer: Johnathan (26 goals)
- Biggest home win: Gangwon 4–0 Bucheon (4 April 2015); Seoul E 4-0 Chungju (16 May 2015); Sangju 4–0 Chungju (13 June 2015); Daegu 5–1 Sangju (23 September 2015)
- Biggest away win: Goyang 0–5 Sangju (13 May 2015)
- Highest scoring: Gangwon 4–4 Seoul E (22 November 2015)
- Highest attendance: 20,157; Daegu 2–1 Gangwon (29 March 2015)
- Lowest attendance: 249; Goyang 1–0 Gangwon (10 June 2015)
- Average attendance: 1,606

The 2015 K League Challenge was the third season of the K League 2, the second-highest division in the South Korean football league system. Champions and winners of promotion playoffs could be promoted to the K League Classic.

== Teams ==
Locations of the 2015 K League Challenge clubs

=== Team changes ===
Relegated from K League Classic

- Gyeongnam FC
- Sangju Sangmu

Promoted to K League Classic

- Daejeon Citizen
- Gwangju FC

Newly joined

- Seoul E-Land

=== Stadiums ===
Ansan Police	FC Anyang	Bucheon FC 1995
Ansan Wa~ Stadium	Anyang Stadium	Bucheon Stadium
Capacity: 35,000	Capacity: 17,143	Capacity: 34,545
Chungju Hummel	Daegu FC	Gangwon FC
Chungju Stadium	Daegu Stadium	Gangneung Stadium
Capacity: 15,000	Capacity: 68,014	Capacity: 22,333
Goyang Hi FC	Gyeongnam FC	Sangju Sangmu
Goyang Stadium	Changwon Football Center	Sangju Stadium
Capacity: 41,311	Capacity: 15,500	Capacity: 15,042
Seoul E-Land	Suwon FC	
Seoul Olympic Stadium	Suwon Stadium	
Capacity: 69,950	Capacity: 24,670	

=== Personnel and sponsoring ===
Note: Flags indicate national team as has been defined under FIFA eligibility rules. Players may hold more than one non-FIFA nationality.

Team	Managers	Kit manufacturer	Main sponsor
Ansan Police	(South Korea) Lee Heung-sil	Zaicro	
FC Anyang	(South Korea) Lee Woo-hyung	Zaicro	KB Kookmin Bank
Bucheon FC 1995	(South Korea) Choi Jin-han	Astore	Bucheon Government
Chungju Hummel	(South Korea) Kim Jong-pil	Hummel	Chungju Government
Daegu FC	(South Korea) Lee Young-jin	Kelme	Daegu Government
Gyeongnam FC	(South Korea) Park Sung-hwa	Hummel	
Gangwon FC	(South Korea) Choi Yun-kyum	Hummel	
Goyang Hi FC	(South Korea) Lee Young-moo	New Balance	
Sangju Sangmu	(South Korea) Park Hang-seo	Atemi	
Seoul E-Land	(Scotland) Martin Rennie	New Balance	E-Land
Suwon FC	(South Korea) Cho Duck-je	Hummel	Suwon Government

=== Foreign players ===
Restricting the number of foreign players strictly to four per team, including a slot for a player from AFC countries. A team could use four foreign players on the field each game.

Club	Player 1	Player 2	Player 3	Asian Player
FC Anyang	(United States) Austin Berry			
Bucheon FC 1995	(Brazil) Rodrigo Paraná	(Brazil) Almir	(Brazil) Lukian	
Chungju Hummel	(Brazil) Marcinho			
Daegu FC	(Brazil) Léo Jaime	(Brazil) Johnathan	(Brazil) Serginho	(Palestine) Éder Lima
Gyeongnam FC	(Brazil) Fauver	(Serbia) Miloš Stojanović	(Tunisia) Imed Louati	
Gangwon FC	(Brazil) Jonatas Belusso	(Brazil) Henan	(Brazil) Gil	
Goyang Hi FC				
Seoul E-Land	(Trinidad and Tobago) Carlyle Mitchell	(Jamaica) Ryan Johnson	(Brazil) Tarabai	(Japan) Robert Cullen
Suwon FC	(Brazil) Japa	(Montenegro) Vladan Adžić	(Spain) Sisi	

== League table ==
Pos	Team	Pld	W	D	L	GF	GA	GD	Pts	Qualification
1	Sangju Sangmu (C, P)	40	20	7	13	77	57	+20	67	Promotion to the K League Classic
2	Daegu FC	40	18	13	9	67	47	+20	67	Qualification for the promotion playoffs semi-final
3	Suwon FC (O, P)	40	18	11	11	64	54	+10	65	Qualification for the promotion playoffs first round
4	Seoul E-Land	40	16	13	11	69	58	+11	61	Qualification for the promotion playoffs first round
5	Bucheon FC 1995	40	15	10	15	43	45	−2	55	
6	FC Anyang	40	13	15	12	53	52	+1	54	
7	Gangwon FC	40	13	12	15	64	56	+8	51	
8	Goyang Hi FC	40	13	10	17	46	68	−22	49	
9	Gyeongnam FC	40	10	13	17	30	43	−13	43	
10	Ansan Police	40	9	15	16	31	48	−17	42	
11	Chungju Hummel	40	10	11	19	49	65	−16	41	

Source: K League
Rules for classification: 1) Points; 2) Goal difference; 3) Goals scored.
(C) Champions; (O) Play-off winners; (P) Promoted

== Positions by matchday ==
Leaders
Qualification for the promotion playoffs

=== Round 1–22 ===
Team ╲ Round	1	2	3	4	5	6	7	8	9	10	11	12	13	14	15	16	17	18	19	20	21	22
Sangju Sangmu	2	4	1	1	2	3	2	3	2	1	1	1	1	1	1	1	1	1	1	1	1	1
Daegu FC	9	6	6	6	4	1	1	1	1	2	3	4	4	4	4	3	3	3	2	2	2	2
Seoul E-Land	7	9	10	10	10	10	7	5	6	4	4	3	2	3	2	2	2	2	3	3	3	3
Suwon FC	11	8	3	3	1	2	4	2	3	3	2	2	3	2	3	4	4	4	4	4	4	4
Goyang Hi FC	4	7	2	2	3	4	3	4	4	5	6	5	5	5	5	5	5	5	5	5	5	5
Bucheon FC 1995	3	5	9	8	5	5	6	8	8	8	9	7	8	9	9	8	8	6	6	8	7	6
Ansan Police	5	2	5	5	7	7	8	6	5	6	5	6	6	6	6	7	6	7	8	7	6	7
Chungju Hummel	8	10	11	11	11	11	11	10	10	11	10	10	7	7	8	9	9	8	9	10	8	8
Gyeongnam FC	5	2	7	7	8	8	10	11	11	10	7	8	10	8	7	6	7	9	7	6	9	9
Gangwon FC	10	11	8	9	9	9	9	9	9	9	11	11	9	11	10	10	10	10	10	9	10	10
FC Anyang	1	1	4	4	6	6	5	7	7	7	8	9	11	10	11	11	11	11	11	11	11	11

Source: K League

=== Round 23–44 ===
Team ╲ Round	23	24	25	26	27	28	29	30	31	32	33	34	35	36	37	38	39	40	41	42	43	44
Sangju Sangmu	1	1	1	1	1	1	1	1	1	1	1	1	2	2	2	3	2	2	2	2	1	1
Daegu FC	2	3	3	3	3	2	2	2	2	2	2	2	1	1	1	1	1	1	1	1	2	2
Suwon FC	4	4	4	4	4	4	4	4	4	3	3	4	3	3	3	4	3	4	4	3	3	3
Seoul E-Land	3	2	2	2	2	3	3	3	3	4	4	3	4	4	4	2	4	3	3	4	4	4
Bucheon FC 1995	5	5	5	5	5	5	5	5	5	5	5	5	5	5	5	5	5	5	5	5	5	5
FC Anyang	11	11	9	9	7	8	8	7	9	8	8	8	8	8	8	9	7	7	6	6	6	6
Gangwon FC	9	9	8	8	9	9	7	9	7	7	7	7	7	7	7	8	9	8	8	8	7	7
Goyang Hi FC	6	6	6	7	6	6	6	6	6	6	6	6	6	6	6	6	6	6	7	7	8	8
Gyeongnam FC	10	10	11	11	11	11	11	10	10	10	10	11	10	10	10	10	10	10	10	10	9	9
Ansan Police	8	8	7	6	8	7	9	8	8	9	9	9	9	9	9	7	8	9	9	9	10	10
Chungju Hummel	7	7	10	10	10	10	10	11	11	11	11	10	11	11	11	11	11	11	11	11	11	11

Source: K League

== Results ==
=== Matches 1–20 ===
Home \ Away	ASM	ANY	BUC	CJH	DGU	GWN	GHI	GNM	SJS	SEL	SUW
Ansan Police	—	0–0	0–0	1–0	1–1	0–2	1–1	0–1	0–3	2–2	1–0
FC Anyang	0–1	—	1–1	2–1	1–1	2–2	1–2	0–0	1–5	0–1	3–0
Bucheon FC 1995	0–1	1–1	—	0–0	2–1	3–2	1–2	1–2	3–1	0–3	2–2
Chungju Hummel	3–2	1–1	0–1	—	1–1	3–1	0–1	0–0	3–3	1–2	0–2
Daegu FC	3–0	2–2	2–0	2–1	—	2–1	1–2	1–0	2–2	1–0	1–4
Gangwon FC	1–1	0–0	4–0	0–1	1–2	—	0–1	0–1	1–2	3–1	3–1
Goyang Hi FC	1–2	2–1	1–0	2–0	0–2	1–0	—	0–1	0–5	2–4	2–3
Gyeongnam FC	0–0	1–1	1–2	0–1	0–1	0–0	0–1	—	1–3	2–3	1–2
Sangju Sangmu	2–0	3–2	1–0	4–0	0–2	3–1	0–0	4–2	—	3–2	0–0
Seoul E-Land	2–2	1–1	0–0	4–0	1–1	2–4	2–0	1–1	2–3	—	2–0
Suwon FC	2–2	0–0	3–2	2–3	2–2	2–1	2–0	0–1	1–1	1–5	—

Source: K League
Legend: Blue = home team win; Yellow = draw; Red = away team win.

=== Matches 21–40 ===
Home \ Away	ASM	ANY	BUC	CJH	DGU	GWN	GHI	GNM	SJS	SEL	SUW
Ansan Police	—	1–2	0–2	0–1	0–0	1–0	2–2	2–2	2–2	0–1	0–1
FC Anyang	2–1	—	0–0	1–0	0–2	1–2	3–0	2–0	2–1	3–4	3–2
Bucheon FC 1995	0–1	0–1	—	2–0	0–1	4–2	1–0	1–0	2–1	3–1	0–0
Chungju Hummel	0–0	2–2	2–0	—	1–1	0–2	1–2	0–2	4–1	1–3	1–3
Daegu FC	1–0	2–4	1–1	1–1	—	0–1	2–3	3–0	5–1	3–3	1–2
Gangwon FC	2–0	4–1	1–1	3–3	3–2	—	2–2	1–1	0–2	4–4	1–1
Goyang Hi FC	0–1	1–0	2–3	2–5	3–3	2–4	—	2–1	0–4	2–1	1–1
Gyeongnam FC	0–1	2–2	1–0	1–0	1–3	0–0	0–0	—	1–0	0–0	0–0
Sangju Sangmu	3–0	1–2	2–1	1–2	2–1	0–3	4–1	1–0	—	1–1	2–5
Seoul E-Land	1–1	1–0	1–0	4–2	0–2	0–0	1–1	0–1	1–0	—	1–4
Suwon FC	2–1	1–2	1–2	2–1	0–2	3–2	0–0	3–1	1–0	3–1	—

Source: K League
Legend: Blue = home team win; Yellow = draw; Red = away team win.

== Promotion playoffs ==
When the first round and semi-final match were finished as draws, their winners were decided on the regular season rankings without extra time and the penalty shoot-out.

=== Bracket ===
First round
3	Suwon FC	3
4	Seoul E-Land	3

Semi-final
2	Daegu FC	1
3	Suwon FC	2

Final
Suwon FC	1	2	3
Busan IPark	0	0	0

=== First round ===
25 November 2015
19:00 KST

Suwon FC	3–3	Seoul E-Land
Japa 20'; Lim Seong-taek 45+2'; Kim Young-kwang 55' (o.g.)	Report	Tarabai 33' (pen.); Yoon Sung-yeul 43'; Jeon Min-gwang 52'

Suwon Sports Complex, Suwon
Attendance: 1,240
Referee: Ko Hyung-jin

=== Semi-final ===
28 November 2015
14:00 KST

Daegu FC	1–2	Suwon FC
No Byung-jun 40'	Report	Bae Shin-young 19'; Japa 79'

Daegu Stadium, Daegu
Attendance: 1,824
Referee: Song Min-seok

=== Final ===
The promotion-relegation playoffs were held between the winners of the 2015 K League Challenge playoffs and the 11th-placed club of the 2015 K League Classic. The winners on aggregate score after both matches earned entry into the 2016 K League Classic.

2 December 2015
19:00 KST

Suwon FC	1–0	Busan IPark
Jung Min-woo 85'	Report

Suwon Sports Complex, Suwon
Attendance: 2,347
Referee: Lee Dong-jun

5 December 2015
16:00 KST

Busan IPark	0–2	Suwon FC
	Report	Lim Seong-taek 80'; Japa 90+4'

Busan Gudeok Stadium, Busan
Attendance: 6,135
Referee: Woo Sang-il

Suwon FC won 3–0 on aggregate and were promoted to the K League Classic, while Busan IPark were relegated to the K League Challenge.

== Player statistics ==
=== Top scorers ===
Rank	Player	Club	Goals
1	(Brazil) Johnathan	Daegu FC	26
2	(South Korea) Joo Min-kyu	Seoul E-Land	23
3	(Brazil) Japa	Suwon FC	19
3	(South Korea) Cho Seok-jae	Chungju Hummel	19
5	(Brazil) Tarabai	Seoul E-Land	17
6	(South Korea) Ko Kyung-min	FC Anyang	16
7	(Brazil) Jonatas Belusso	Gangwon FC	15
8	(South Korea) Lim Sang-hyub	Sangju Sangmu	12
8	(South Korea) Kim You-sung	Goyang Hi FC	12
10	(South Korea) Choi Seung-in	Gangwon FC	11
10	(Brazil) Rodrigo Paraná	Bucheon FC 1995	11

=== Top assist providers ===
Rank	Player	Club	Assists
1	(South Korea) Kim Jae-sung	Seoul E-Land	11
2	(South Korea) Lim Chang-gyoon	Gyeongnam FC	9
2	(South Korea) Seo Bo-min	Gangwon FC	9
2	(South Korea) Moon Ki-han	Daegu FC	9
5	(South Korea) Kim Jong-woo	Suwon FC	8
6	(South Korea) Jang Baek-gyu	Daegu FC	7
6	(Brazil) Japa	Suwon FC	7
6	(South Korea) Choi Jin-soo	FC Anyang	7
6	(South Korea) Joo Min-kyu	Seoul E-Land	7
10	(South Korea) Lee Jung-hyup	Sangju Sangmu	6
10	(South Korea) Han Sang-woon	Sangju Sangmu	6
10	(South Korea) Kim Young-keun	Seoul E-Land	6
10	(South Korea) Kwon Yong-hyun	Suwon FC	6
10	(South Korea) Lee Hak-min	Bucheon FC 1995	6
10	(South Korea) Jin Chang-soo	Goyang Hi FC	6
10	(Brazil) Johnathan	Daegu FC	6

== Attendance ==
Attendants who entered with free ticket were not counted.

Pos	Team	Total	High	Low	Average	Change
1	Daegu FC	60,569	20,157	504	3,028	+213.5%
2	Gyeongnam FC	37,835	5,214	311	1,892	−58.3%^{†}
3	Seoul E-Land	36,510	4,342	680	1,826	n/a
4	FC Anyang	34,003	10,147	583	1,700	+8.1%
5	Bucheon FC 1995	33,943	12,332	511	1,697	+57.7%
6	Ansan Police	33,298	10,094	304	1,665	+178.4%
7	Gangwon FC	27,137	7,051	438	1,357	+34.6%
8	Suwon FC	27,106	5,688	420	1,355	+36.9%
9	Sangju Sangmu	24,692	4,244	512	1,235	−51.7%^{†}
10	Chungju Hummel	24,553	3,925	514	1,228	+58.7%
11	Goyang Hi FC	13,764	3,083	249	688	+17.8%
	League total	353,410	20,157	249	1,606	+32.6%

Source: K League
Notes:
^{†} Team played previous season in K League Classic.

== Awards ==
The 2015 K League Awards was held on 1 December 2015.

=== Main awards ===
- Most Valuable Player: (Brazil) Johnathan (Daegu FC)
- Top goalscorer: (Brazil) Johnathan (Daegu FC)
- Top assist provider: (South Korea) Kim Jae-sung (Seoul E-Land)
- Manager of the Year: (South Korea) Cho Duck-je (Suwon FC)

=== Best XI ===
Position	Player	Club
Goalkeeper	(South Korea) Jo Hyeon-woo	Daegu FC
Defenders	(South Korea) Park Jin-po	Sangju Sangmu
Defenders	(South Korea) Shin Hyung-min	Ansan Police
Defenders	(South Korea) Kang Min-soo	Sangju Sangmu
Defenders	(South Korea) Lee Yong	Sangju Sangmu
Midfielders	(South Korea) Ko Kyung-min	FC Anyang
Midfielders	(South Korea) Lee Seung-gi	Sangju Sangmu
Midfielders	(South Korea) Cho Won-hee	Seoul E-Land
Midfielders	(South Korea) Kim Jae-sung	Seoul E-Land
Forwards	(Brazil) Johnathan	Daegu FC
Forwards	(South Korea) Joo Min-kyu	Seoul E-Land

=== Player of the Round ===
Round	Player	Club
1	(South Korea) Lee Jung-hyup	Sangju Sangmu
2	(Brazil) Léo Jaime	Daegu FC
3	(South Korea) Choi Seung-in	Gangwon FC
4	(South Korea) Yeo Sung-hye	Sangju Sangmu
5	(Brazil) Almir	Bucheon FC 1995
6	(South Korea) No Byung-jun	Daegu FC
7	(South Korea) Kim Jae-sung	Seoul E-Land
8	(Brazil) Johnathan	Daegu FC
9	(South Korea) Park Gi-dong	Sangju Sangmu
10	(Brazil) Japa	Suwon FC
11	(South Korea) Kim Young-keun	Seoul E-Land
12	(South Korea) Joo Min-kyu	Seoul E-Land
13	(South Korea) Joo Min-kyu	Seoul E-Land
14	(South Korea) Lee Hyun-chang	Chungju Hummel
15	(South Korea) Lim Sang-hyub	Sangju Sangmu
16	(South Korea) Han Sang-woon	Sangju Sangmu
17	(South Korea) Lee Jung-hyup	Sangju Sangmu
18	(South Korea) Jeong Woo-jae	Chungju Hummel
19	(Brazil) Johnathan	Daegu FC
20	(Brazil) Henan	Gangwon FC
21	(South Korea) Joo Min-kyu	Seoul E-Land
22	(South Korea) Lim Sang-hyub	Sangju Sangmu

Round	Player	Club
23	(South Korea) Cho Seok-jae	Chungju Hummel
24	(South Korea) Kim Ryun-do	Bucheon FC 1995
25	(South Korea) Seo Bo-min	Gangwon FC
26	(South Korea) Kim Jae-woong	Suwon FC
27	(South Korea) Kwon Young-hyun	Suwon FC
28	(Brazil) Johnathan	Daegu FC
29	(Brazil) Gil	Gangwon FC
30	(South Korea) Han Sang-woon	Sangju Sangmu
31	(South Korea) Jung Gi-woon	Suwon FC
32	(Brazil) Johnathan	Daegu FC
33	(South Korea) Choi Jin-soo	FC Anyang
34	(Brazil) Johnathan	Daegu FC
35	(Brazil) Johnathan	Daegu FC
36	(Brazil) Tarabai	Seoul E-Land
37	(Montenegro) Vladan Adžić	Suwon FC
38	(South Korea) Gong Min-hyun	Bucheon FC 1995
39	(Brazil) Japa	Suwon FC
40	(South Korea) Cho Dong-geon	Sangju Sangmu
41	(Brazil) Gil	Gangwon FC
42	(Brazil) Gil	Gangwon FC
43	(Brazil) Henan	Gangwon FC
44	(South Korea) Cho Seok-jae	Chungju Hummel

=== Manager of the Month ===
Month	Manager	Club	Division
March	(South Korea) Nam Ki-il	Gwangju FC	K League Classic
April	(South Korea) Choi Kang-hee	Jeonbuk Hyundai Motors	K League Classic
May	(South Korea) Kim Hak-bum	Seongnam FC	K League Classic
June	(South Korea) Park Hang-seo	Sangju Sangmu	K League Challenge
July	(South Korea) Choi Kang-hee	Jeonbuk Hyundai Motors	K League Classic
August	(South Korea) Kim Hak-bum	Seongnam FC	K League Classic
September	(South Korea) Hwang Sun-hong	Pohang Steelers	K League Classic
October	(South Korea) Lee Young-jin	Daegu FC	K League Challenge
November	(South Korea) Cho Duck-je	Suwon FC	K League Challenge

== See also ==
- 2015 in South Korean football
- 2015 K League Classic
- 2015 Korean FA Cup
