= 2015 K League =

2015 K League may refer to:

- 2015 K League Classic (1st Division)
- 2015 K League Challenge (2nd Division)
