= 2017 K League =

2017 K League may refer to:

- 2017 K League Classic (1st Division)
- 2017 K League Challenge (2nd Division)
