= 2016 K League =

2016 K League may refer to:

- 2016 K League Classic (1st Division)
- 2016 K League Challenge (2nd Division)
