= 2015 K League Classic =

33rd season of top-tier football league in South Korea

Hyundai Oilbank K League Classic
- Season: 2015
- Dates: 7 March – 29 November 2015
- Champions: Jeonbuk Hyundai Motors (4th title)
- Relegated: Busan IPark; Daejeon Citizen
- Champions League: Jeonbuk Hyundai Motors; FC Seoul; Suwon Samsung Bluewings; Pohang Steelers
- Matches: 228
- Goals: 546 (2.39 per match)
- Best player: Lee Dong-gook
- Top goalscorer: Kim Shin-wook (18 goals)
- Biggest home win: Jeju 5–0 Daejeon (21 March 2015)
- Biggest away win: Daejeon 1–4 Seongnam (4 April 2015)
- Highest scoring: Jeju 4–3 Seongnam (3 June 2015); Jeju 3–4 Suwon (17 June 2015); Daejeon 3–4 Jeonbuk (5 July 2015); Pohang 3–4 Jeju (8 July 2015); Jeonnam 2–5 Ulsan (25 October 2015); Seoul 3–4 Suwon (7 November 2015)
- Longest winning run: 6 matches Pohang Steelers
- Longest unbeaten run: 15 matches Pohang Steelers
- Longest winless run: 17 matches Daejeon Citizen
- Longest losing run: 8 matches Daejeon Citizen
- Highest attendance: 39,328; Seoul 0–0 Suwon (27 June 2015)
- Lowest attendance: 628; Jeonnam 2–1 Gwangju (7 November 2015)
- Average attendance: 7,720

The 2015 K League Classic was the 33rd season of the top division of South Korean professional football, and the third season of the K League Classic.

== Teams ==
Locations of the 2015 K League Classic clubs

=== General information ===
Club	City/Province	Manager	Owner(s)	Other sponsor(s)
Busan IPark	Busan	(South Korea) Yoon Sung-hyo	HDC Hyundai Development Company	
Daejeon Citizen	Daejeon	(South Korea) Cho Jin-ho	Daejeon Government	
Gwangju FC	Gwangju	(South Korea) Nam Ki-il	Gwangju Government	
Incheon United	Incheon	(South Korea) Kim Do-hoon	Incheon Government	Shinhan Bank; Incheon International Airport
Jeju United	Jeju	(South Korea) Jo Sung-hwan	SK Energy	
Jeonbuk Hyundai Motors	Jeonbuk	(South Korea) Choi Kang-hee	Hyundai Motor Company	
Jeonnam Dragons	Jeonnam	(South Korea) Roh Sang-rae	POSCO	
Pohang Steelers	Pohang, Gyeongbuk	(South Korea) Hwang Sun-hong	POSCO	
Seongnam FC	Seongnam, Gyeonggi	(South Korea) Kim Hak-bum	Seongnam Government	
FC Seoul	Seoul	(South Korea) Choi Yong-soo	GS Group	
Suwon Samsung Bluewings	Suwon, Gyeonggi	(South Korea) Seo Jung-won	Cheil Worldwide	Samsung Electronics
Ulsan Hyundai	Ulsan	(South Korea) Yoon Jung-hwan	Hyundai Heavy Industries	

=== Stadiums ===
Busan IPark	Daejeon Citizen	Gwangju FC	Incheon United	Jeju United	Jeonbuk Hyundai Motors
Busan Asiad Stadium	Daejeon World Cup Stadium	Gwangju World Cup Stadium	Incheon Football Stadium	Jeju World Cup Stadium	Jeonju World Cup Stadium
Capacity: **53,864**	Capacity: **41,295**	Capacity: **44,118**	Capacity: **20,891**	Capacity: **35,657**	Capacity: **42,477**
Jeonnam Dragons	Pohang Steelers	Seongnam FC	FC Seoul	Suwon Samsung Bluewings	Ulsan Hyundai
Gwangyang Football Stadium	Pohang Steel Yard	Tancheon Stadium	Seoul World Cup Stadium	Suwon World Cup Stadium	Ulsan Munsu Football Stadium
Capacity: **20,009**	Capacity: **25,000**	Capacity: **16,250**	Capacity: **66,704**	Capacity: **43,959**	Capacity: **44,474**

=== Managerial changes ===
Team	Outgoing	Manner	Date	Incoming	Date	Table
Jeonnam Dragons	(South Korea) Ha Seok-ju	Resigned	29 November 2014	(South Korea) Roh Sang-rae	29 November 2014	Pre-season
Ulsan Hyundai	(South Korea) Cho Min-kook	Sacked	1 December 2014	(South Korea) Yoon Jung-hwan	1 December 2014	Pre-season
Jeju United	(South Korea) Park Kyung-hoon	Resigned	3 December 2014	(South Korea) Jo Sung-hwan	12 December 2014	Pre-season
Incheon United	(South Korea) Kim Bong-gil	Sacked	19 December 2014	(South Korea) Kim Do-hoon	13 January 2015	Pre-season
Gwangju FC	(South Korea) Nam Ki-il (caretaker)	Promoted	4 January 2015	(South Korea) Nam Ki-il	4 January 2015	Pre-season
Daejeon Citizen	(South Korea) Cho Jin-ho	Resigned	21 May 2015	(Canada) Michael Kim (caretaker)	21 May 2015	12th
Daejeon Citizen	(Canada) Michael Kim (caretaker)	Resigned	26 May 2015	(South Korea) Choi Moon-sik	27 May 2015	12th
Busan IPark	(South Korea) Yoon Sung-hyo	Resigned	13 July 2015	(Brazil) Denis Iwamura (caretaker)	13 July 2015	11th
Busan IPark	(Brazil) Denis Iwamura (caretaker)	Caretaker	7 October 2015	(South Korea) Choi Young-jun	7 October 2015	11th

=== Foreign players ===
Restricting the number of foreign players strictly to four per team, including a slot for a player from AFC countries. A team could use four foreign players on the field each game including a least one player from the AFC country. Players name in bold indicates the player is registered during the mid-season transfer window.

As of 31 July 2015

Club	Player 1	Player 2	Player 3	Asian player	Former players
Busan IPark	(Brazil) **Bill**	(Brazil) **Elias**	(Brazil) Weslley		(Brazil) Bergson (Brazil) Nilson
Daejeon Citizen	(Brazil) **Niltinho**	(Brazil) **Rafinha**	(Brazil) **Wanderson Carvalho**	(Philippines) **Álvaro Silva**	(Brazil) Adriano Michael Jackson (Brazil) Ricardinho
Gwangju FC	(Brazil) **Cassiano**	(Brazil) **Daniel Oliveira**	(Brazil) Fábio Neves		(Brazil) Gilberto Fortunato
Incheon United	(Belgium) Kevin Oris	(Croatia) Matej Jonjić		(Japan) **Tomoki Wada**	
Jeju United	(Brazil) **Ciro**	(Brazil) Fernando Karanga	(Brazil) Ricardo Lopes	(Australia) **Aleksandar Jovanović**	
Jeonbuk Hyundai Motors	(Brazil) Leonardo	(Brazil) **Luiz Henrique**	(Spain) **Urko Vera**	(Australia) Alex Wilkinson	(Brazil) Edu (Brazil) Eninho
Jeonnam Dragons	(Brazil) Leandrinho	(Croatia) Mislav Oršić	(North Macedonia) Stevica Ristić		
Pohang Steelers	(Brazil) Tiago Alves	(Serbia) Lazar Veselinović			(Brazil) André Moritz
Seongnam FC	(Brazil) Lucas Pajeu	(Colombia) **Javier Reina**			(Brazil) Jorginho (Brazil) Ricardo Bueno
FC Seoul	(Brazil) **Adriano Michael Jackson**	(Colombia) Mauricio Molina	(Spain) Osmar	(Japan) Yojiro Takahagi	(Brazil) Éverton Santos
Suwon Samsung Bluewings	(Brazil) Júnior Santos	(Bulgaria) **Iliyan Mitsanski**	(Brazil) Kaio		(Brazil) Léo Itaperuna
Ulsan Hyundai	(Brazil) **Éverton Santos**	(Croatia) **Ivan Kovačec**	(Uzbekistan) Server Djeparov	(Japan) Chikashi Masuda	(Brazil) Tartá (Montenegro) Filip Kasalica

== League table ==
Pos	Team	Pld	W	D	L	GF	GA	GD	Pts	Qualification or relegation
1	Jeonbuk Hyundai Motors (C)	38	22	7	9	57	39	+18	73	Qualification for Champions League group stage
2	Suwon Samsung Bluewings	38	19	10	9	60	43	+17	67	Qualification for Champions League group stage
3	Pohang Steelers	38	18	12	8	49	32	+17	66	Qualification for Champions League play-off round
4	FC Seoul	38	17	11	10	52	44	+8	62	Qualification for Champions League group stage (Note: Qualified as champions of FA Cup.)
5	Seongnam FC	38	15	15	8	41	33	+8	60	
6	Jeju United	38	14	8	16	55	56	−1	50	
7	Ulsan Hyundai	38	13	14	11	54	45	+9	53	
8	Incheon United	38	13	12	13	35	32	+3	51	
9	Jeonnam Dragons	38	12	13	13	46	51	−5	49	
10	Gwangju FC	38	10	12	16	35	44	−9	42	
11	Busan IPark (R)	38	5	11	22	30	55	−25	26	Qualification for relegation play-offs
12	Daejeon Citizen (R)	38	4	7	27	32	72	−40	19	Relegation to K League Challenge

Source: K League
Rules for classification: 1) Points; 2) Goal difference; 3) Goals scored; 4) Wins
(C) Champions; (R) Relegated

== Positions by matchday ==
Leaders
Qualification for Champions League
Qualification for relegation play-offs
Relegation to K League Challenge

=== Round 1–33 ===
Team ╲ Round	1	2	3	4	5	6	7	8	9	10	11	12	13	14	15	16	17	18	19	20	21	22	23	24	25	26	27	28	29	30	31	32	33
Jeonbuk Hyundai Motors	1	2	3	2	1	1	1	1	1	1	1	1	1	1	1	1	1	1	1	1	1	1	1	1	1	1	1	1	1	1	1	1	1
Suwon Samsung Bluewings	9	5	4	3	3	4	2	2	4	2	2	2	2	2	2	2	2	2	2	2	2	2	2	2	2	2	2	2	2	2	2	2	2
Pohang Steelers	3	6	5	6	8	5	4	4	5	5	4	4	3	4	4	4	3	3	3	5	6	4	5	5	3	3	5	5	5	3	3	3	3
Seongnam FC	11	10	10	9	7	6	7	7	8	7	5	6	5	7	9	10	10	9	7	6	7	5	6	6	4	4	3	3	3	4	4	4	4
FC Seoul	11	11	11	10	10	8	9	9	10	10	7	8	10	6	3	3	5	5	4	4	3	6	4	4	6	5	4	4	4	5	5	5	5
Jeju United	7	7	6	7	4	3	5	6	2	3	3	3	4	3	6	7	7	6	8	8	8	8	9	9	9	9	8	8	8	8	8	7	6
Incheon United	5	9	9	11	11	10	10	10	9	8	5	7	8	10	10	9	9	8	6	7	5	7	7	8	7	7	6	6	6	6	6	6	7
Jeonnam Dragons	7	7	8	5	5	9	6	5	6	6	9	9	6	8	7	6	4	4	5	3	4	3	3	3	5	6	7	7	7	7	7	8	8
Ulsan Hyundai	1	1	1	1	2	2	3	3	3	4	8	5	7	9	8	8	8	10	10	10	10	10	10	10	10	10	10	10	10	10	9	9	9
Gwangju FC	5	3	2	4	6	7	8	8	7	9	10	10	9	5	5	5	6	7	9	9	9	9	8	7	8	8	9	9	9	9	10	10	10
Busan IPark	3	4	7	8	9	11	11	11	11	11	11	11	11	11	11	11	11	11	11	11	11	11	11	11	11	11	11	11	11	11	11	11	11
Daejeon Citizen	9	12	12	12	12	12	12	12	12	12	12	12	12	12	12	12	12	12	12	12	12	12	12	12	12	12	12	12	12	12	12	12	12

Source: K League

=== Round 34–38 ===
Team ╲ Round	34	35	36	37	38
Jeonbuk Hyundai Motors	1	1	1	1	1
Suwon Samsung Bluewings	2	3	3	2	2
Pohang Steelers	3	2	2	3	3
FC Seoul	4	4	4	4	4
Seongnam FC	5	5	5	5	5
Jeju United	6	6	6	6	6
Ulsan Hyundai	9	8	8	8	7
Incheon United	7	7	7	7	8
Jeonnam Dragons	8	9	9	9	9
Gwangju FC	10	10	10	10	10
Busan IPark	11	11	11	11	11
Daejeon Citizen	12	12	12	12	12

Source: K League

== Results ==
=== Matches 1–22 ===
Teams play each other twice, once at home, once away.

Home \ Away	BIP	DJC	GWJ	ICU	JJU	JHM	JND	PHS	SEN	SEO	SSB	USH
Busan IPark	—	1–0	2–3	1–2	1–3	1–2	0–2	1–2	0–1	0–1	1–1	1–0
Daejeon Citizen	0–0	—	0–2	1–2	2–2	3–4	2–3	0–2	1–4	1–2	1–2	1–1
Gwangju FC	0–1	1–2	—	1–0	1–0	2–3	3–2	0–0	0–0	1–1	0–2	1–2
Incheon United	3–1	2–0	2–2	—	1–0	0–0	1–2	1–1	0–1	1–1	1–1	1–1
Jeju United	0–0	5–0	2–1	0–0	—	0–3	3–2	1–0	4–3	2–4	3–4	2–1
Jeonbuk Hyundai Motors	2–1	2–1	1–1	1–0	1–0	—	2–2	1–0	2–0	1–2	2–0	2–1
Jeonnam Dragons	3–1	0–0	1–2	1–0	1–1	2–1	—	0–0	2–1	2–0	1–1	2–1
Pohang Steelers	1–2	2–1	2–1	0–2	3–4	0–0	4–1	—	2–2	2–1	0–1	2–4
Seongnam FC	1–0	3–1	1–1	0–0	1–1	2–1	0–0	0–2	—	1–1	1–3	1–0
FC Seoul	0–0	1–0	1–1	1–0	1–0	1–2	3–0	1–3	1–1	—	0–0	0–0
Suwon Samsung Bluewings	2–1	1–2	0–1	2–1	1–0	2–2	1–0	0–1	1–1	5–1	—	3–1
Ulsan Hyundai	1–1	4–1	2–0	1–1	2–0	1–2	0–0	2–2	0–1	2–0	1–1	—

Source: K League
Legend: Blue = home team win; Yellow = draw; Red = away team win.

=== Matches 23–33 ===
Home \ Away	BIP	DJC	GWJ	ICU	JJU	JHM	JND	PHS	SEN	SEO	SSB	USH
Busan IPark	—	2–1	—	—	0–2	—	1–1	—	—	2–4	2–2	2–2
Daejeon Citizen	—	—	0–0	—	2–4	—	—	0–1	0–2	—	—	0–0
Gwangju FC	0–0	—	—	—	0–1	1–2	0–0	—	—	—	2–4	—
Incheon United	2–1	2–1	1–0	—	1–0	—	—	0–2	—	—	—	1–2
Jeju United	—	—	—	—	—	3–2	—	0–1	—	2–1	2–4	2–2
Jeonbuk Hyundai Motors	2–0	3–1	—	0–1	—	—	2–1	—	—	3–0	2–1	—
Jeonnam Dragons	—	1–1	—	0–2	3–1	—	—	0–0	1–1	—	0–2	—
Pohang Steelers	2–0	—	0–0	—	—	3–0	—	—	2–1	—	0–0	—
Seongnam FC	1–0	—	2–1	1–0	1–1	0–1	—	—	—	—	—	—
FC Seoul	—	2–0	3–1	2–0	—	—	3–2	0–0	0–1	—	—	—
Suwon Samsung Bluewings	—	2–1	—	1–0	—	—	—	—	0–1	0–3	—	3–1
Ulsan Hyundai	—	—	0–1	—	—	2–0	3–2	1–1	0–0	1–2	—	—

Source: K League
Legend: Blue = home team win; Yellow = draw; Red = away team win.

=== Matches 34–38 ===
After 33 matches, the league splits into two sections of six teams each, with teams playing every other team in their section once (either at home or away). The exact matches are determined upon the league table at the time of the split.

==== Group A ====
Home \ Away	JJU	JHM	PHS	SEN	SEO	SSB
Jeju United	—	0–1	—	—	1–1	—
Jeonbuk Hyundai Motors	—	—	0–1	1–1	—	—
Pohang Steelers	2–1	—	—	0–0	2–1	—
Seongnam FC	2–1	—	—	—	1–2	0–0
FC Seoul	—	0–0	—	—	—	4–3
Suwon Samsung Bluewings	0–1	2–1	2–1	—	—	—

Source: K League
Legend: Blue = home team win; Yellow = draw; Red = away team win.

==== Group B ====
Home \ Away	BIP	DJC	GWJ	ICU	JND	USH
Busan IPark	—	—	0–1	—	1–1	—
Daejeon Citizen	2–1	—	—	0–2	1–0	—
Gwangju FC	—	2–1	—	0–0	—	0–1
Incheon United	0–0	—	—	—	0–1	2–2
Jeonnam Dragons	—	—	2–1	—	—	2–5
Ulsan Hyundai	2–1	2–1	—	—	—	—

Source: K League
Legend: Blue = home team win; Yellow = draw; Red = away team win.

== Relegation play-offs ==
The promotion-relegation play-offs were held between the winners of the 2015 K League Challenge play-offs and the 11th-placed club of the 2015 K League Classic. The winners on aggregate score after both matches earned entry into the 2016 K League Classic.

2 December 2015
19:00 KST

Suwon FC	1–0	Busan IPark
Jung Min-woo 85'	Report

Suwon Sports Complex, Suwon
Attendance: 2,347
Referee: Lee Dong-jun

5 December 2015
16:00 KST

Busan IPark	0–2	Suwon FC
	Report	Lim Seong-taek 80'; Japa 90+4'

Busan Gudeok Stadium, Busan
Attendance: 6,135
Referee: Woo Sang-il

Suwon FC won 3–0 on aggregate and were promoted to the K League Classic, while Busan IPark were relegated to the K League Challenge.

== Player statistics ==
=== Top scorers ===
Rank	Player	Club	Goals
1	(South Korea) Kim Shin-wook	Ulsan Hyundai	18
2	(Brazil) Adriano Michael Jackson	Daejeon Citizen; FC Seoul	15
2	(South Korea) Hwang Ui-jo	Seongnam FC	15
4	(South Korea) Lee Dong-gook	Jeonbuk Hyundai Motors	13
5	(Brazil) Júnior Santos	Suwon Samsung Bluewings	12
5	(South Korea) Lee Jong-ho	Jeonnam Dragons	12
5	(North Macedonia) Stevica Ristić	Jeonnam Dragons	12
8	(Brazil) Edu	Jeonbuk Hyundai Motors	11
8	(Brazil) Ricardo Lopes	Jeju United	11
10	(South Korea) Kwon Chang-hoon	Suwon Samsung Bluewings	10
10	(Brazil) Leonardo	Jeonbuk Hyundai Motors	10

=== Top assist providers ===
Rank	Player	Club	Assists
1	(South Korea) Yeom Ki-hun	Suwon Samsung Bluewings	17
2	(Brazil) Ricardo Lopes	Jeju United	11
2	(Colombia) Mauricio Molina	FC Seoul	11
4	(South Korea) Kim Do-heon	Seongnam FC	8
5	(Croatia) Mislav Oršić	Jeonnam Dragons	7
5	(South Korea) Kim Tae-hwan	Ulsan Hyundai	7
5	(South Korea) Yoon Bit-garam	Jeju United	7
8	(Croatia) Ivan Kovačec	Ulsan Hyundai	6
8	(South Korea) Song Jin-hyung	Jeju United	6
8	(South Korea) Ju Se-jong	Busan IPark	6

== Awards ==
=== Main awards ===
The 2015 K League Awards was held on 1 December 2015.

Award	Winner	Club
Most Valuable Player	(South Korea) Lee Dong-gook	Jeonbuk Hyundai Motors
Top goalscorer	(South Korea) Kim Shin-wook	Ulsan Hyundai
Top assist provider	(South Korea) Yeom Ki-hun	Suwon Samsung Bluewings
Young Player of the Year	(South Korea) Lee Jae-sung	Jeonbuk Hyundai Motors
FANtastic Player	(South Korea) Lee Dong-gook	Jeonbuk Hyundai Motors
Manager of the Year	(South Korea) Choi Kang-hee	Jeonbuk Hyundai Motors
Special Award	(Spain) Osmar	FC Seoul
Special Award	(South Korea) Shin Hwa-yong	Pohang Steelers
Fair Play Award	Suwon Samsung Bluewings	

=== Best XI ===
Position	Winner	Club
Goalkeeper	(South Korea) Kwon Sun-tae	Jeonbuk Hyundai Motors
Defenders	(South Korea) Hong Chul	Suwon Samsung Bluewings
Defenders	(Croatia) Matej Jonjić	Incheon United
Defenders	(South Korea) Kim Kee-hee	Jeonbuk Hyundai Motors
Defenders	(South Korea) Cha Du-ri	FC Seoul
Midfielders	(South Korea) Yeom Ki-hun	Suwon Samsung Bluewings
Midfielders	(South Korea) Lee Jae-sung	Jeonbuk Hyundai Motors
Midfielders	(South Korea) Kwon Chang-hoon	Suwon Samsung Bluewings
Midfielders	(South Korea) Song Jin-hyung	Jeju United
Forwards	(South Korea) Lee Dong-gook	Jeonbuk Hyundai Motors
Forwards	(Brazil) Adriano Michael Jackson	FC Seoul

=== Player of the Round ===
Round	Winner	Club
1	(Brazil) Edu	Jeonbuk Hyundai Motors
2	(South Korea) Kim Ho-nam	Gwangju FC
3	(South Korea) Kim Seung-dae	Pohang Steelers
4	(South Korea) Kim Do-heon	Seongnam FC
5	(South Korea) Han Kyo-won	Jeonbuk Hyundai Motors
6	(South Korea) Son Jun-ho	Pohang Steelers
7	(North Korea) Jong Tae-se	Suwon Samsung Bluewings
8	(Brazil) Adriano Michael Jackson	Daejeon Citizen
9	(Brazil) Edu	Jeonbuk Hyundai Motors
10	(South Korea) Jung Hoon	Jeonbuk Hyundai Motors
11	(South Korea) Yeom Ki-hun	Suwon Samsung Bluewings
12	(South Korea) Kang Su-il	Jeju United FC
13	(South Korea) Hwang Ui-jo	Seongnam FC
14	(South Korea) Yoon Bit-garam	Jeju United FC
15	(South Korea) Ko Moo-yeol	Pohang Steelers
16	(Brazil) Júnior Santos	Suwon Samsung Bluewings
17	(Brazil) Júnior Santos	Suwon Samsung Bluewings
18	(Croatia) Mislav Oršić	Jeonnam Dragons
19	(Brazil) Éverton Santos	FC Seoul

Round	Winner	Club
20	(South Korea) Lee Dong-gook	Jeonbuk Hyundai Motors
21	(Brazil) Ricardo Lopes	Jeju United FC
22	(North Macedonia) Stevica Ristić	Jeonnam Dragons
23	(South Korea) Lee Jae-sung	Jeonbuk Hyundai Motors
24	(South Korea) Park Chu-young	FC Seoul
25	(South Korea) Cho Chan-ho	Suwon Samsung Bluewings
26	(Brazil) Adriano Michael Jackson	FC Seoul
27	(South Korea) Kwon Chang-hoon	Suwon Samsung Bluewings
28	(South Korea) Kwon Sun-tae	Jeonbuk Hyundai Motors
29	(Brazil) Ricardo Lopes	Jeju United FC
30	(Brazil) Fernando Karanga	Jeju United FC
31	(Brazil) Adriano Michael Jackson	FC Seoul
32	(South Korea) Kwon Chang-hoon	Suwon Samsung Bluewings
33	(Brazil) Ricardo Lopes	Jeju United FC
34	(South Korea) Kim Ho-jun	Jeju United FC
35	(Croatia) Ivan Kovačec	Ulsan Hyundai
36	(South Korea) Yun Ju-tae	FC Seoul
37	(South Korea) Kwon Chang-hoon	Suwon Samsung Bluewings
38	(South Korea) Yeom Ki-hun	Suwon Samsung Bluewings

=== Manager of the Month ===
Month	Manager	Club	Division
March	(South Korea) Nam Ki-il	Gwangju FC	K League Classic
April	(South Korea) Choi Kang-hee	Jeonbuk Hyundai Motors	K League Classic
May	(South Korea) Kim Hak-bum	Seongnam FC	K League Classic
June	(South Korea) Park Hang-seo	Sangju Sangmu	K League Challenge
July	(South Korea) Choi Kang-hee	Jeonbuk Hyundai Motors	K League Classic
August	(South Korea) Kim Hak-bum	Seongnam FC	K League Classic
September	(South Korea) Hwang Sun-hong	Pohang Steelers	K League Classic
October	(South Korea) Lee Young-jin	Daegu FC	K League Challenge
November	(South Korea) Cho Duck-je	Suwon FC	K League Challenge

== Attendance ==
=== Attendance by club ===
Attendants who entered with free ticket are not counted.

Pos	Team	Total	High	Low	Average	Change
1	Jeonbuk Hyundai Motors	330,856	31,192	4,928	17,413	+32.3%
2	FC Seoul	326,269	39,328	4,267	17,172	+0.9%
3	Suwon Samsung Bluewings	250,702	29,046	6,538	13,195	−32.7%
4	Pohang Steelers	175,520	19,227	3,354	9,238	−5.7%
5	Jeju United	117,754	20,013	1,011	6,542	−2.5%
6	Ulsan Hyundai	119,309	18,031	1,524	6,279	−10.7%
7	Seongnam FC	107,619	12,187	1,593	5,664	+50.8%
8	Incheon United	97,250	10,704	1,623	4,863	+6.4%
9	Jeonnam Dragons	82,407	12,608	628	4,337	+28.9%
10	Busan IPark	63,440	9,123	1,187	3,339	+2.6%
11	Daejeon Citizen	47,370	11,857	763	2,493	−22.0%^{†}
12	Gwangju FC	41,567	3,117	1,062	2,188	+62.8%^{†}
	League total	1,760,063	39,328	628	7,720	−2.7%

Updated to games played on 29 November 2015
Source: K League
Notes:
^{†} Teams that played previous season in K League Challenge.

=== Top matches ===
Rank	Date	Home	Score	Away	Venue	Attendance	Round	Day of week
1	27 June 2015	FC Seoul	0–0	Suwon Samsung Bluewings	Seoul World Cup Stadium	39,328	18	Saturday
2	14 March 2015	FC Seoul	1–2	Jeonbuk Hyundai Motors	Seoul World Cup Stadium	32,516	2	Saturday
3	26 July 2015	Jeonbuk Hyundai Motors	2–1	Suwon Samsung Bluewings	Jeonju World Cup Stadium	31,192	23	Sunday
4	2 May 2015	Jeonbuk Hyundai Motors	2–0	Suwon Samsung Bluewings	Jeonju World Cup Stadium	30,410	9	Saturday
5	19 September 2015	Suwon Samsung Bluewings	0–3	FC Seoul	Suwon World Cup Stadium	29,046	31	Saturday
6	21 November 2015	Jeonbuk Hyundai Motors	1–1	Seongnam FC	Jeonju World Cup Stadium	28,460	37	Saturday
7	12 September 2015	Jeonbuk Hyundai Motors	3–0	FC Seoul	Jeonju World Cup Stadium	26,433	30	Saturday
8	18 April 2015	Suwon Samsung Bluewings	5–1	FC Seoul	Suwon World Cup Stadium	26,250	7	Saturday
9	25 October 2015	FC Seoul	0–0	Jeonbuk Hyundai Motors	Seoul World Cup Stadium	24,262	35	Sunday
10	7 March 2015	Jeonbuk Hyundai Motors	2–0	Seongnam FC	Jeonju World Cup Stadium	23,810	1	Saturday

== See also ==
- 2015 in South Korean football
- 2015 K League Challenge
- 2015 Korean FA Cup
