= Ivan Herceg (footballer) =

Croatian footballer (born 1990)

Personal information
- Full name: Ivan Herceg
- Date of birth: 10 February 1990 (age 36)
- Place of birth: Zagreb, SFR Yugoslavia
- Height: 1.86 m (6 ft 1 in)
- Positions: Centre back; defensive midfielder; right back; left back

Team information
- Current team: FCO Strasbourg Koenigshoffen 06

Youth career
- 2000–2008: Dinamo Zagreb

Senior career*
Years	Team	Apps	(Gls)
2008	Dinamo Zagreb	0	(0)
2009–2010	Lokomotiva	35	(0)
2010–2013	Inter Zaprešić	74	(1)
2013–2015	Maccabi Petah Tikva	59	(0)
2015–2016	Puskás Akadémia	6	(0)
2016–2018	Gyeongnam FC	52	(1)
2018–2019	Seoul E-Land	10	(0)
2019–2021	FA Illkirch Graffenstaden	20	(0)
2021–	FCO Strasbourg Koenigshoffen 06		

International career^{‡}
2005	Croatia U15	1	(0)
2005–2006	Croatia U16	3	(0)
2006	Croatia U17	6	(1)
2008	Croatia U18	4	(0)
2007–2008	Croatia U19	3	(0)
- * Club domestic league appearances and goals as of 1 July 2018 ‡ National team caps and goals as of 26 March 2017

Ivan Herceg (Croatian pronunciation: [ǐʋan xěrtseɡ]; born 10 February 1990 in Zagreb, SR Croatia, SFR Yugoslavia) is a Croatian professional footballer who currently plays for French club FCO Strasbourg Koenigshoffen 06.

== Club career ==
Herceg came through youth ranks of Dinamo Zagreb and started his senior career at Dinamo Zagreb's affiliate Lokomotiva. During his first season he featured in 13 league matches for the club. The club was eventually promoted as the third-placed finisher and Herceg continued to play in the new top–flight club.

== Career statistics ==
As of November 2018

Club performance			League		Cup		League Cup		Continental		Total	
Season	Club	League	Apps	Goals	Apps	Goals	Apps	Goals	Apps	Goals	Apps	Goals
Croatia			League		Croatian Cup		League Cup		Europe		Total	
2008–09	Lokomotiva	Druga HNL	13	0							13	0
2009–10	Lokomotiva	Prva HNL	22	0							22	0
South Korea			League		FA Cup		League Cup		Asia		Total	
2016	Gyeongnam FC	K League 2	22	0	0	0	—		—		22	0
2017	Gyeongnam FC	K League 2	30	1	2	0	—		—		32	1
2018	Gyeongnam FC	K League 1	0	0	0	0	—		—		0	0
2018	Seoul E-Land	K League 2	10	0	0	0	—		—		10	0
Career total												
