= Jung Gi-woon =

South Korean footballer

Personal information
- Full name: Jung Gi-woon
- Date of birth: 5 July 1992 (age 34)
- Place of birth: South Korea
- Height: 1.86 m (6 ft 1 in)
- Position: Forward

Team information
- Current team: Suwon FC
- Number: 33

Youth career
- Kwangwoon University

Senior career*
Years	Team	Apps	(Gls)
2015–2016	Suwon FC	39	(6)
- * Club domestic league appearances and goals as of 12 December 2016

Jung Gi-woon (Korean: 정기운; born 5 July 1992) is a South Korean footballer who plays as forward for Suwon FC in K League Challenge.

== Career ==
Jung was selected by Suwon FC in the 2015 K League draft.
