= Kim Sung-ju =

South Korean footballer (born 1990)

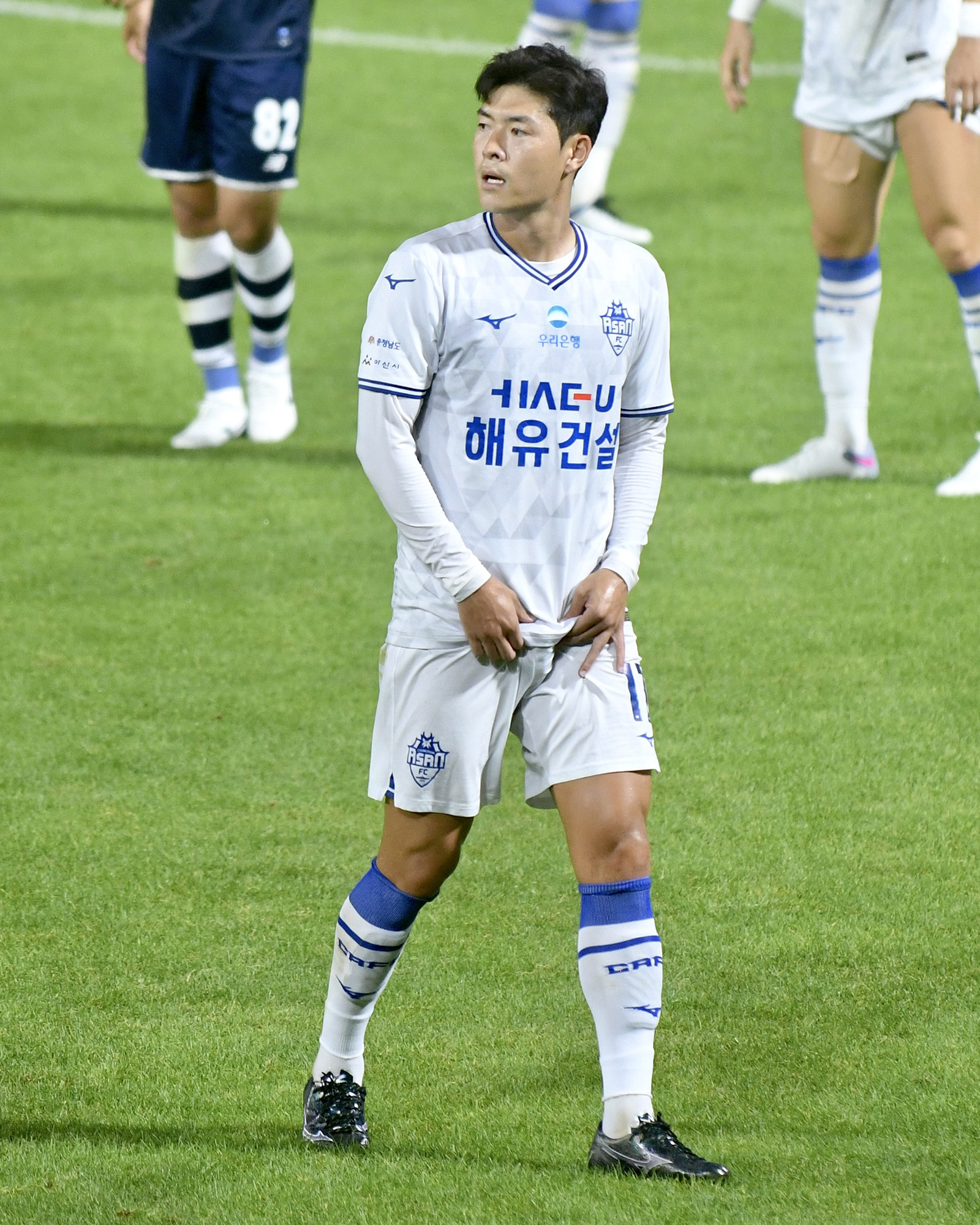
- Kim in 2023

Personal information
- Date of birth: 15 November 1990 (age 35)
- Place of birth: Pohang, South Korea
- Height: 1.79 m (5 ft 10 in)
- Position: Midfielder

Youth career
- 2006–2008: Pohang Steelers
- 2009–2011: Soongsil University

Senior career*
Years	Team	Apps	(Gls)
2012	Albirex Niigata	2	(0)
2013–2014	Kataller Toyama	60	(1)
2015–2017	Seoul E-Land	42	(5)
2016–2017	→ Sangju Sangmu (army)	32	(1)
2018	Ulsan Hyundai	2	(0)
2018–2019	Jeju United	32	(1)
2020–2021	Incheon United	14	(0)
2021	Pohang Steelers	3	(0)

International career
2011	South Korea U23	2	(0)
- * Club domestic league appearances and goals as of 11 February 2022

Kim Sung-ju (Korean: 김성주; born 15 November 1990) is a South Korean football player. He is a left-footed play-making midfielder.

== Club statistics ==
Club performance			League		Cup		League Cup		Total	
Season	Club	League	Apps	Goals	Apps	Goals	Apps	Goals	Apps	Goals
Japan			League		Emperor's Cup		J.League Cup		Total	
2012	Albirex Niigata	J1 League	2	0	0	0	2	0	4	0
2013	Kataller Toyama	J2 League	31	1	1	0	–		32	1
2014	Kataller Toyama	J2 League	29	0	0	0	–		29	0
Korea			League		FA Cup		–		Total	
2015	Seoul E-Land FC	K League Challenge	37	5	0	0	–		37	5
Japanese Total			62	1	1	0	2	0	65	1
Korean Total			37	5	0	0	–		30	4
Total			92	5	1	0	2	0	95	5
