= Léo Jaime (footballer) =

Brazilian footballer

Personal information
- Full name: Léo Jaime da Silva Pinheiro
- Date of birth: 23 March 1986 (age 40)
- Place of birth: Fortaleza, Brazil
- Height: 1.62 m (5 ft 4 in)
- Position: Forward

Team information
- Current team: São Bernardo

Senior career*
Years	Team	Apps	(Gls)
2006–2009	Ferroviário		
2007	→ Aracati (loan)		
2008	→ Horizonte (loan)		
2008	→ Fortaleza (loan)		
2009	→ Bragantino (loan)	28	(6)
2010–2018	Bragantino	144	(19)
2015	→ Daegu FC (loan)	38	(5)
2017	→ São Caetano (loan)	0	(0)
2019	Caxias	0	(0)
2019	Ferroviário CE	9	(0)
2019	Ferroviária	0	(0)
2020–	São Bernardo	0	(0)
- * Club domestic league appearances and goals as of 23:58, 18 June 2019 (UTC)

Léo Jaime da Silva Pinheiro (born March 23, 1986, in Fortaleza), known as Léo Jaime, is a Brazilian footballer who plays for São Bernardo as forward.

== Career statistics ==
As of 12 May 2021

Appearances and goals by club, season and competition
Club	Season	League			State League		Cup		Conmebol		Other		Total	
Club	Season	Division	Apps	Goals	Apps	Goals	Apps	Goals	Apps	Goals	Apps	Goals	Apps	Goals
Fortaleza	2008	Série B	14	2	—		—		—		—		14	2
Ferroviário	2009	Série D	—		14	6	—		—		—		14	6
Bragantino	2009	Série B	28	6	—		—		—		—		28	6
Bragantino	2010	Série B	19	2	9	4	—		—		—		28	6
Bragantino	2011	Série B	27	5	10	1	—		—		—		37	6
Bragantino	2012	Série B	28	4	20	2	—		—		—		48	6
Bragantino	2013	Série B	14	4	16	7	2	1	—		—		32	12
Bragantino	2014	Série B	22	4	15	3	6	0	—		—		43	7
Bragantino	2016	Série B	19	0	11	1	—		—		—		30	1
Bragantino	2018	Série C	15	0	14	1	2	1	—		—		31	2
Bragantino	Total		172	25	95	19	10	2	—		—		277	46
Daegu FC (loan)	2015	K Challenge	38	5	—		—		—		—		38	5
São Caetano (loan)	2017	Paulista A2	—		—		5	0	—		—		5	0
Caxias	2019	Série D	—		12	1	—		—		—		12	1
Ferroviário	2019	Série C	8	1	—		—		—		—		8	1
Ferroviária	2019	Série D	—		—		9	2	—		—		9	2
São Bernardo	2020	Paulista A2	—		17	3	—		—		—		17	3
Portuguesa	2021	Série D	—		11	1	—		—		—		11	1
Career total			232	33	149	30	24	4	0	0	0	0	405	67
