= Park Joon-gang =

South Korean footballer (born 1991)

Park Joon-Gang
Personal information
- Full name: Park Joon-Gang
- Date of birth: 6 June 1991 (age 35)
- Place of birth: South Korea
- Height: 1.74 m (5 ft 8 1/2 in)
- Position: Full back

Youth career
- 2010–2012: Sangji University

Senior career*
| Years | Team | Apps | (Gls) |
| 2013–2016 | Busan IPark | 64 | (1) |
| 2016–2018 | → Sangju Sangmu (army) | 16 | (0) |
| 2018-2020 | Busan IPark | 47 | (1) |
| 2021-2022 | Gwangju FC | 4 | (0) |
| 2023-2025 | Cheonan City FC | 41 | (0) |

International career
| 2013–14 | South Korea U-23 | 2 | (0) |
- * Club domestic league appearances and goals as of 1 January 2026

Park Joon-Gang (Korean: 박준강; born 6 June 1991) is a South Korean footballer who plays as a right back.

== Career ==
Park was selected by Busan IPark in the K League draft. He scored his first goal for the club against Gyeongnam FC on 3 August. Park established himself as IPark's first choice right back in the 2013 season, but injuries and the form of Yoo Ji-no restricted his appearances over the following two years.

Park completed his mandatory military service with army team Sangju Sangmu, joining the club in 2016, but the presence of international right-back Kim Tae-hwan restricted him to 16 appearances over two seasons. At the completion of his military service, Park returned to Busan IPark in 2018.

Following Busan's relegation to the K League 2 at the close of the 2020 season, Park joined Gwangju FC.

== Club career statistics ==
As of 8 November 2020

| Club performance | | | League | | Cup | | Play-offs | | Total | |
| Season | Club | League | Apps | Goals | Apps | Goals | Apps | Goals | Apps | Goals |
|---|---|---|---|---|---|---|---|---|---|---|
| 2013 | Busan IPark | K League 1 | 30 | 1 | 3 | 0 | - | - | 33 | 1 |
| 2014 | Busan IPark | K League 1 | 14 | 0 | 2 | 0 | - | - | 16 | 0 |
| 2015 | Busan IPark | K League 1 | 20 | 0 | 0 | 0 | 2 | 0 | 22 | 0 |
| 2016 | Sangju Sangmu | K League 1 | 9 | 0 | 0 | 0 | 0 | 0 | 9 | 0 |
| 2017 | Sangju Sangmu | K League 1 | 7 | 0 | 2 | 0 | 0 | 0 | 9 | 0 |
| 2018 | Busan IPark | K League 2 | 14 | 1 | 1 | 0 | - | - | 15 | 1 |
| 2019 | Busan IPark | K League 2 | 14 | 0 | 0 | 0 | 1 | 0 | 15 | 0 |
| 2020 | Busan IPark | K League 1 | 19 | 0 | 0 | 0 | 0 | 0 | 19 | 0 |
| Career total | | | 127 | 2 | 8 | 0 | 3 | 0 | 138 | 2 |
