= Gustavo Sauer =

Brazilian footballer (born 1993)

Personal information
- Full name: Gustavo Affonso Sauerbeck
- Date of birth: 30 April 1993 (age 33)
- Place of birth: Joinville, Brazil
- Height: 1.81 m (5 ft 11 1/2 in)
- Position: Winger

Team information
- Current team: Wuhan Three Towns
- Number: 7

Youth career
- Joinville

Senior career*
| Years | Team | Apps | (Gls) |
| 2013–2016 | Joinville | 7 | (0) |
| 2014 | → Gandzasar Kapan (loan) | 1 | (0) |
| 2015 | → Metropolitano (loan) | 6 | (0) |
| 2015 | → Paraná (loan) | 8 | (1) |
| 2016 | Daejeon Citizen | 22 | (6) |
| 2017 | Al-Shaab | | |
| 2017–2019 | Botev Plovdiv | 40 | (3) |
| 2019–2022 | Boavista | 96 | (10) |
| 2022–2024 | Botafogo | 22 | (6) |
| 2023–2024 | → Çaykur Rizespor (loan) | 33 | (1) |
| 2024 | → Cuiabá (loan) | 11 | (0) |
| 2025– | Wuhan Three Towns | 54 | (15) |
- * Club domestic league appearances and goals as of 18 October 2026

Gustavo Affonso Sauerbeck (born 30 April 1993), also known as Gustavo Sauer, is a Brazilian professional footballer who plays as a winger for Wuhan Three Towns.

== Club career ==
=== Early career ===
In February 2016, Gustavo was loaned to K League Challenge side Daejeon Citizen for the 2016 season. Previously, Gustavo had been on loan at fellow Brazilian sides Metropolitano and Paraná in 2015, and Armenian side Gandzasar Kapan in the latter half of 2014.

=== Botev Plovdiv ===
On 25 August 2017, Gustavo joined Botev Plovdiv. Gustavo made a debut on 21 September during the 1-3 away victory in the 1/16 final of the Bulgarian Cup against Lokomotiv Gorna Oryahovitsa.

On 24 September Gustavo played his first game in First Professional Football League (Bulgaria) and scored a goal for the 3-0 win in the derby game against Lokomotiv Plovdiv.

On 11 May 2018 Gustavo had a controversial performance during the 2-1 win over Beroe Stara Zagora. He assisted for the first goal of João Paulo da Silva Araújo but later on was sent off for committing a brutal foul against Matheus Leoni.

After a long goal-drought, on 25 August 2018, Gustavo scored in the last minute for the 0-2 away win over FC Vitosha Bistritsa.

== Personal life ==
His younger brother Gabriel Sauer is also a footballer. A centre-back, he was also groomed at Joinville.

== Career statistics ==
As of match played 18 October 2026

Appearances and goals by club, season and competition
| Club | Season | League | | | State League | | National Cup | | League Cup | | Continental | | Other | | Total | |
| Club | Season | Division | Apps | Goals | Apps | Goals | Apps | Goals | Apps | Goals | Apps | Goals | Apps | Goals | Apps | Goals |
|---|---|---|---|---|---|---|---|---|---|---|---|---|---|---|---|---|
| Joinville | 2013 | Série B | 0 | 0 | 0 | 0 | 0 | 0 | — | | — | | 3 (Note: Appearance(s) in Copa Santa Catarina) | 0 | 3 | 0 |
| Joinville | 2014 | Série B | 2 | 0 | 0 | 0 | 1 | 0 | — | | — | | — | | 3 | 0 |
| Joinville | 2015 | Série B | 0 | 0 | 0 | 0 | 0 | 0 | — | | — | | — | | 0 | 0 |
| Joinville | 2016 | Série B | 0 | 0 | 5 | 0 | 0 | 0 | — | | — | | — | | 5 | 0 |
| Joinville | Total | | 2 | 0 | 5 | 0 | 1 | 0 | — | | — | | 3 | 0 | 11 | 0 |
| Gandzasar Kapan (loan) | 2014–15 | Armenian Premier League | 1 | 0 | — | | 1 | 0 | — | | — | | — | | 2 | 0 |
| Metropolitano (loan) | 2015 | Série D | 0 | 0 | 6 | 0 | — | | — | | — | | — | | 6 | 0 |
| Paraná (loan) | 2015 | Série B | 8 | 1 | — | | — | | — | | — | | — | | 8 | 1 |
| Daejeon Citizen (loan) | 2016 | K League Challenge | 22 | 6 | — | | 1 | 0 | — | | — | | — | | 23 | 6 |
| Botev Plovdiv | 2017–18 | First League | 21 | 1 | — | | 4 | 0 | — | | — | | — | | 25 | 1 |
| Botev Plovdiv | 2018–19 | First League | 19 | 2 | — | | 2 | 0 | — | | — | | — | | 21 | 2 |
| Botev Plovdiv | Total | | 40 | 3 | — | | 6 | 0 | — | | — | | — | | 46 | 3 |
| Boavista | 2018–19 | Primeira Liga | 10 | 1 | — | | 0 | 0 | — | | — | | — | | 10 | 1 |
| Boavista | 2019–20 | Primeira Liga | 28 | 1 | — | | 1 | 0 | 1 (Note: Appearance(s) in Taça da Liga) | 0 | — | | — | | 30 | 1 |
| Boavista | 2020–21 | Primeira Liga | 32 | 2 | — | | 2 | 0 | 0 | 0 | — | | — | | 34 | 2 |
| Boavista | 2021–22 | Primeira Liga | 26 | 6 | — | | 1 | 0 | 4 | 4 | — | | — | | 31 | 10 |
| Boavista | Total | | 96 | 10 | — | | 4 | 0 | 5 | 4 | — | | — | | 105 | 14 |
| Botafogo | 2022 | Série A | 9 | 0 | — | | 2 | 0 | — | | — | | — | | 11 | 0 |
| Botafogo | 2023 | Série A | 6 | 2 | 7 | 4 | 1 | 0 | — | | 10 | 1 | — | | 24 | 7 |
| Botafogo | Total | | 15 | 2 | 7 | 4 | 3 | 0 | — | | 10 | 1 | — | | 35 | 7 |
| Rizespor (loan) | 2023–24 | Süper Lig | 33 | 1 | — | | 1 | 0 | — | | — | | — | | 34 | 1 |
| Cuiabá (loan) | 2024 | Série A | 11 | 0 | — | | — | | — | | — | | — | | 11 | 0 |
| Wuhan Three Towns | 2025 | Chinese Super League | 28 | 7 | — | | 0 | 0 | — | | — | | — | | 28 | 7 |
| Wuhan Three Towns | 2026 | Chinese Super League | 26 | 8 | — | | 1 | 0 | — | | — | | — | | 27 | 8 |
| Wuhan Three Towns | Total | | 54 | 15 | — | | 1 | 0 | — | | — | | — | | 55 | 15 |
| Career total | | | 282 | 38 | 18 | 4 | 18 | 0 | 5 | 4 | 10 | 1 | 3 | 0 | 336 | 47 |

== Honors ==
Joinville

- Copa Santa Catarina: 2013
- Campeonato Brasileiro Série B: 2014

Individual

- Primeira Liga's Goal of the Month: September 2021
