= Lee Young-chang =

South Korean footballer

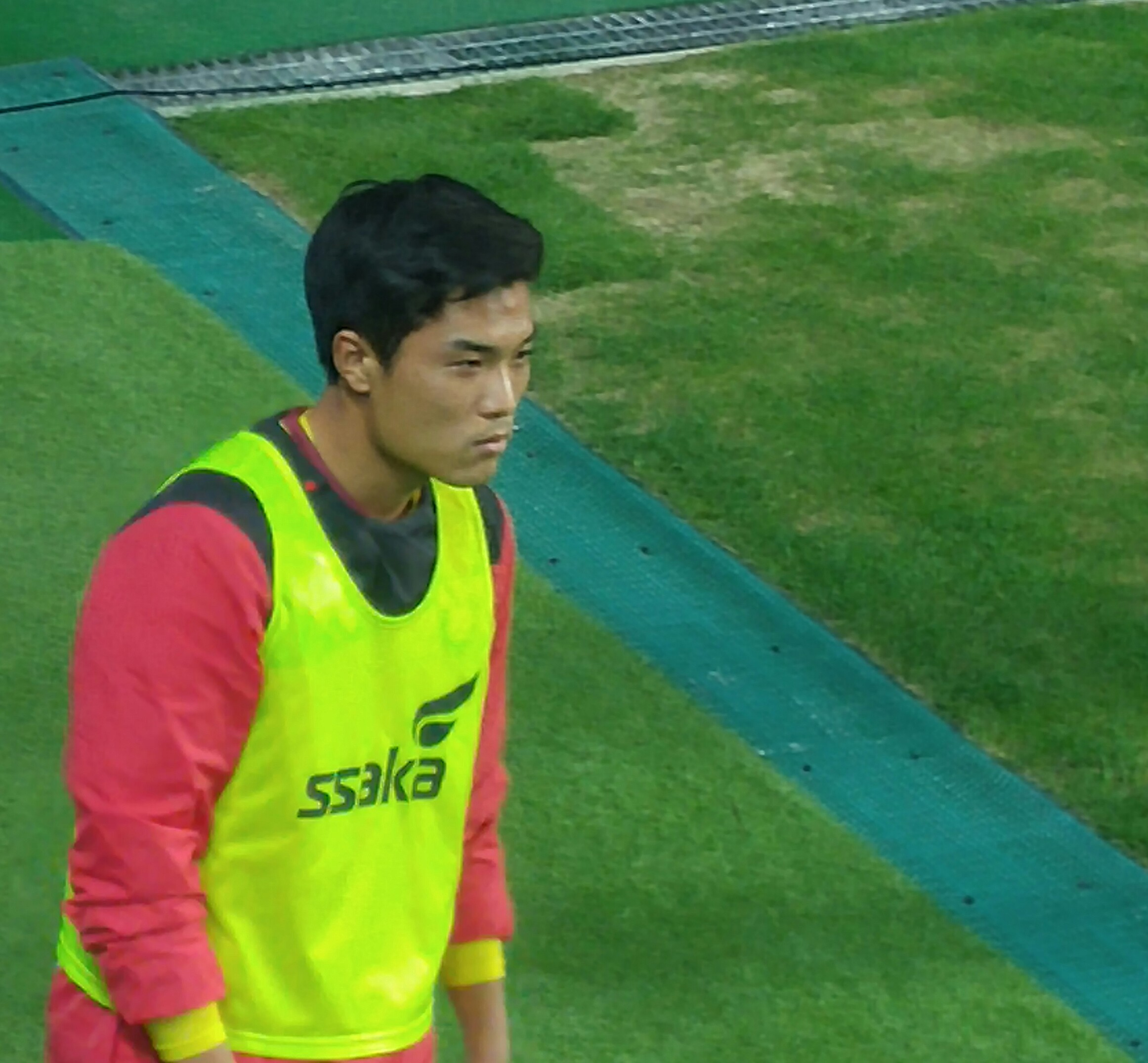

Personal information
- Full name: Lee Young-chang
- Date of birth: 10 January 1993 (age 33)
- Place of birth: South Korea
- Height: 1.88 m (6 ft 2 in)
- Position: Goalkeeper

Team information
- Current team: Bucheon FC 1995
- Number: 1

Youth career
- 2011–2014: Hongik University

Senior career*
Years	Team	Apps	(Gls)
2015–2016	Chungju Hummel	30	(0)
2017	Daejeon Citizen	10	(0)
2018–	Bucheon FC 1995	6	(0)
- * Club domestic league appearances and goals as of 15 November 2019

Lee Young-chang (Korean: 이영창; born 10 January 1993) is a South Korean footballer who plays as goalkeeper for Bucheon FC 1995 in K League 2.

== Career ==
He was selected by Chungju Hummel in 2015 K League draft.
