= Kim Shin (footballer) =

South Korean footballer (born 1995)

Personal information
- Full name: Kim Shin
- Date of birth: 30 March 1995 (age 31)
- Place of birth: South Korea
- Height: 1.81 m (5 ft 11 1/2 in)
- Position: Forward

Team information
- Current team: Gimhae FC

Youth career
- 2011–2013: Jeonbuk Hyundai

Senior career*
Years	Team	Apps	(Gls)
2014–2017	Jeonbuk Hyundai	1	(0)
2014–2015	→ Lyon II (loan)	13	(0)
2016	→ Chungju Hummel (loan)	35	(13)
2017	Bucheon FC 1995	29	(4)
2018–2019	Gyeongnam FC	9	(0)
2019–	Gimhae FC	3	(1)

International career
2013–	South Korea U-20		
- * Club domestic league appearances and goals as of 8 December 2019

Kim Shin (Korean: 김신; born 30 March 1995) is a South Korean forward for Gimhae FC. Besides South Korea, he has played in France.

== Career ==
Kim joined Jeonbuk Hyundai in 2014 and made his debut in the 2014 AFC Champions League match against Yokohama F. Marinos on 15 April. He penned a 2-year loan contract with Ligue 1 side Olympique Lyonnais in summer 2014. After returning from Lyon, he loaned to Chungju Hummel. In Chungju, he scored 13 goals and 7th place on goals in 2016 K League 2. In 2017, he moved to Bucheon FC 1995.
