= Michael Kim (footballer) =

Canadian soccer manager

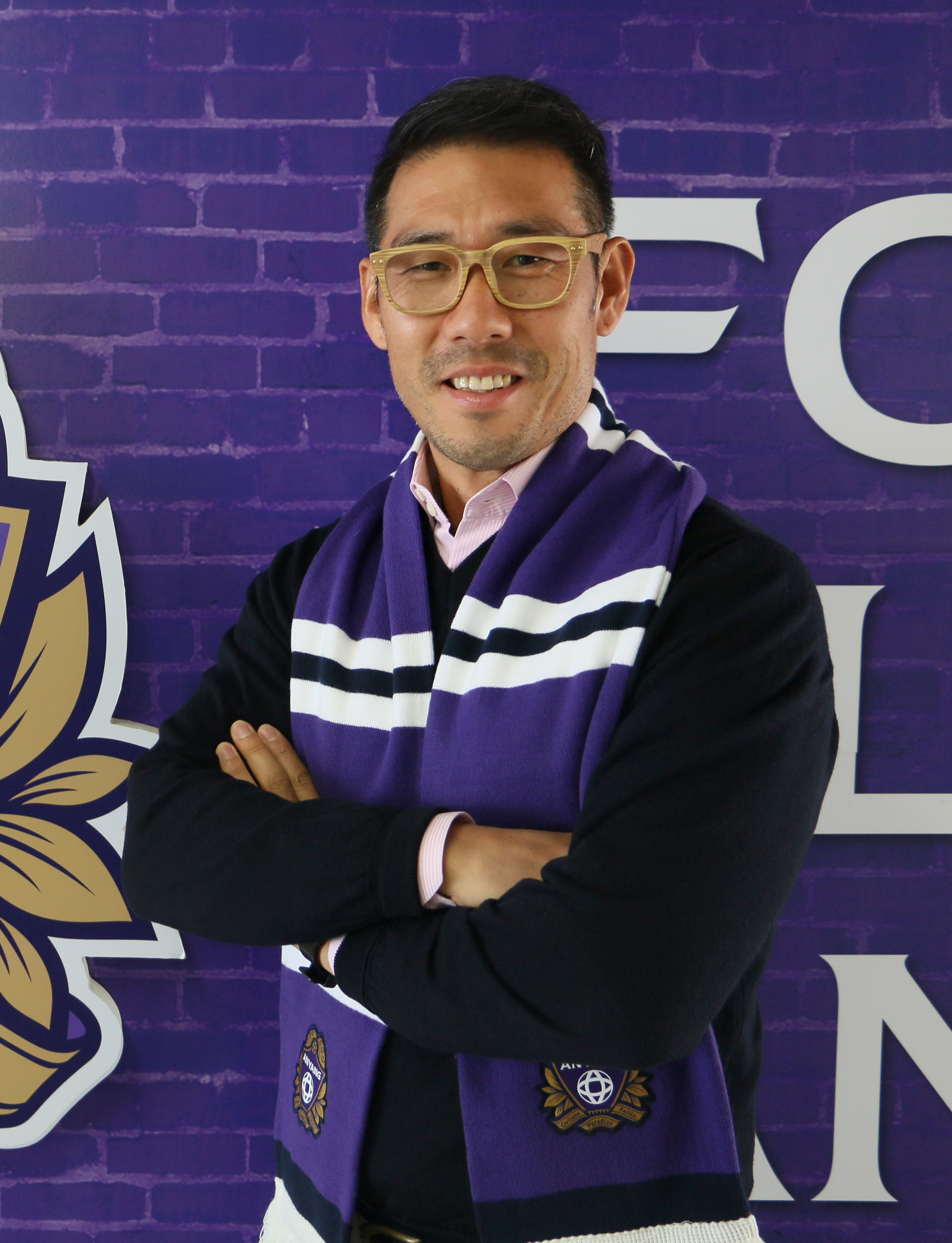

Personal information
- Full name: Michael Young Min Kim
- Date of birth: 10 June 1973 (age 53)

Senior career*
Years	Team	Apps	(Gls)
- York Region Shooters

Managerial career
- 2007–2008: South Korea U23 (assistant)
- 2008–2010: Manchester United (consultant)
- 2015: Daejeon Hana Citizen
- 2015–2016: Shanghai Shenxin (assistant)
- 2017–2018: FC Anyang (assistant)
- 2018–2023: South Korea (assistant)
- * Club domestic league appearances and goals

Michael Young Min Kim (Korean: 마이클 김; born 10 June 1973) is a Canadian soccer manager who formerly served as an assistant coach of the South Korea national team.

== Playing career ==
Kim played college soccer for the Louisville Cardinals.

== Managerial career ==
In 2007, he was appointed assistant manager of South Korea U23. In 2008, he was appointed consultant of English Premier League side Manchester United. In 2015, Kim was appointed manager of Daejeon Hana Citizen in the South Korean top flight.

After that, he was appointed assistant manager of Chinese second division club Shanghai Shenxin. In 2017, he was appointed assistant manager of FC Anyang in the South Korean second division. In 2018, Kim was appointed as an assistant coach for the South Korea national team.
