= Choi Oh-baek =

South Korean footballer

Personal information
- Full name: Choi Oh-baek
- Date of birth: 20 March 1992 (age 34)
- Place of birth: South Korea
- Height: 1.77 m (5 ft 10 in)
- Position: Winger

Team information
- Current team: Mokpo City FC
- Number: 52

Youth career
- 2012–2014: Chosun University

Senior career*
Years	Team	Apps	(Gls)
2015–2019	Seoul E-Land	75	(11)
2019–2021	Seongnam FC	14	(0)
2021	Gyeongju KHNP	6	(0)
2022-	Mokpo City FC	7	(0)
- * Club domestic league appearances and goals as of October 24, 2022

- Choi Oh-baek
- Hangul: 최오백
- Hanja: 崔午百
- RR: Choe Obaek
- MR: Ch'oe Obaek

Choi Oh-baek (Korean: 최오백; born 20 March 1992) is a South Korean footballer who plays as winger for Mokpo City FC.

== Career ==
He joined Seoul E-Land FC in 2015.
