= Atsuki Wada =

Japanese footballer (born 1993)

Personal information
- Full name: Atsuki Wada
- Date of birth: 9 February 1993 (age 33)
- Place of birth: Kobe, Japan
- Height: 1.78 m (5 ft 10 in)
- Position: Midfielder

Youth career
- 2011–2014: Kansai University FC

Senior career*
Years	Team	Apps	(Gls)
2015–2016	Kyoto Sanga	9	(0)
2017	Seoul E-Land	32	(2)

International career
2010	Japan U17		
- * Club domestic league appearances and goals as of 15 January 2018

Atsuki Wada (和田 篤紀, Wada Atsuki; born 9 February 1993 in Kobe) is a Japanese footballer.

== Career statistics ==
Updated to 15 February 2017.

Appearances and goals by club, season and competition
Club	Season	League			Emperor's Cup		Total	
Club	Season	Division	Apps	Goals	Apps	Goals	Apps	Goals
Kyoto Sanga	2015	J2 League	9	0	0	0	9	0
Kyoto Sanga	2016	J2 League	0	0	0	0	0	0
Career total			9	0	0	0	9	0
