= Lim Seong-taek =

South Korean footballer

Lim Seong-Taek
Personal information
- Full name: Lim Seong-Taek
- Date of birth: 19 July 1988 (age 38)
- Place of birth: South Korea
- Height: 1.78 m (5 ft 10 in)
- Position: Forward

Team information
- Current team: Suwon FC

Youth career
- Ajou University

Senior career*
Years	Team	Apps	(Gls)
2011	Daegu FC	0	(0)
2011	Chungju Hummel	14	(0)
2012–	Suwon FC	91	(19)
2016–2017	→ Sangju Sangmu (army)	11	(1)
- * Club domestic league appearances and goals as of 4 January 2018

Lim Seong-Taek (Korean: 임성택; born 19 July 1988) is a South Korean footballer who plays as forward for Suwon FC.

== Career ==
He joined Daegu FC in 2011 but made no appearance in the team. He moved to Korea National League side Chungju Hummel in July.

He signed with Suwon FC in 2012.
