= Lee Ho-seok =

South Korean footballer

Personal information
- Full name: Lee Ho-seok
- Date of birth: 21 May 1991 (age 35)
- Place of birth: Gwangyang, South Korea
- Height: 1.74 m (5 ft 8 1/2 in)
- Positions: Attacking midfielder; striker

Team information
- Current team: Incheon United
- Number: 30

Youth career
- 2010–2013: Dongguk University

Senior career*
Years	Team	Apps	(Gls)
2014	Chungju Hummel	0	(0)
2014–2016	Gyeongnam FC	55	(11)
2017	Daejeon Citizen	27	(5)
2018–	Incheon United	0	(0)
2018–2020	→ Sangju Sangmu (army)	0	(0)
- * Club domestic league appearances and goals as of 28 December 2019

Lee Ho-seok (Korean: 이호석; born 21 May 1991) is a South Korean footballer who plays as attacking midfielder for Incheon United in K League 1.

== Career ==
Lee was selected by Chungju Hummel FC in the 2014 K League draft, but he moved to Gyeongnam FC in less than a month.
