= Jang Baek-gyu =

South Korean footballer

Jang Baek-Gyu
Personal information
- Full name: Jang Baek-Gyu
- Date of birth: 9 October 1991 (age 35)
- Place of birth: South Korea
- Height: 1.70 m (5 ft 7 in)
- Position: Forward

Team information
- Current team: Bucheon FC
- Number: 11

Youth career
- 2010–2013: Sunmoon University

Senior career*
Years	Team	Apps	(Gls)
2014–2015	Daegu FC	46	(5)
2016	→ Chungju Hummel (loan)	28	(4)
2017–2018	Gyeongju KH&NP	56	(20)
2019–	Bucheon FC	3	(0)
- * Club domestic league appearances and goals as of 15 November 2019

Jang Baek-Gyu (Korean: 장백규; born 9 October 1991) is a South Korean footballer who plays as forward for Bucheon FC in K League 2.

== Career ==
He was selected by Daegu FC in the 2014 K League draft.
