= Japa (footballer, born 1986) =

Brazilian footballer

Personal information
- Full name: Jonas Augusto Bouvie
- Date of birth: October 5, 1986 (age 40)
- Place of birth: Brazil
- Height: 1.80 m (5 ft 11 in)
- Position: Forward

Senior career*
Years	Team	Apps	(Gls)
2005–2008	Caxis do Sul		
2006	→ Cerezo Osaka (loan)	0	(0)
2009	Ypiranga-RS		
2010	Guarani		
2011	Londrina EC		
2012	EC Avenida		
2013	CE Aimoré		
2013	F.C. Osaka	3	(1)
2014–2015	Suwon FC	51	(26)
2016–2017	Meizhou Kejia	56	(23)
- * Club domestic league appearances and goals as of 28 October 2017

Jonas Augusto Bouvie (born October 5, 1986) was a Brazilian football player.
