= Cho Deok-je =

South Korean footballer and manager

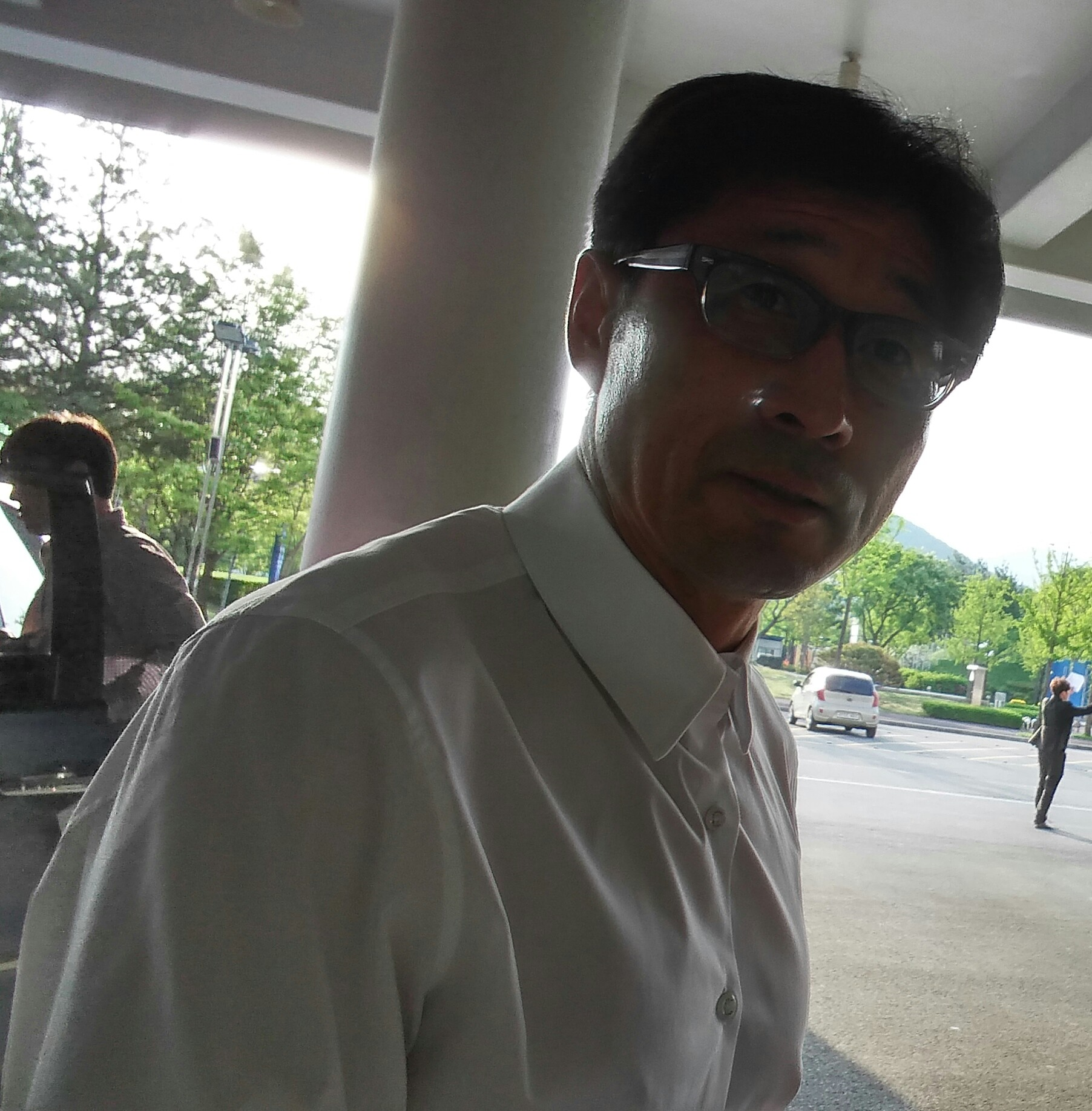

Personal information
- Full name: Cho Deok-je
- Date of birth: October 26, 1965 (age 61)
- Place of birth: South Korea
- Height: 1.72 m (5 ft 8 in)

Senior career*
Years	Team	Apps	(Gls)
1988–1995	Daewoo Royals	191	(9)

International career
1987	South Korea		

Managerial career
- 2004–2011: Ajou University
- 2012–2017: Suwon FC
- 2019–2020: Busan IPark
- 2022–: Malaysia (assistant manager)
- * Club domestic league appearances and goals

Cho Deok-je (Korean: 조덕제, born October 26, 1965) is a former South Korea football player and manager current assistant manager of Malaysia.

== Playing career ==
After playing for Ajou University in his youth career, Cho signed for Daewoo Royals in 1988. The midfielder played over 200 times for Daewoo and was selected in the K League Best XI in 1989. While at Daewoo, the team won the Korean Super League (Now K League 1) in 1991.

== Managerial career ==
=== Ajou University ===
After retiring from playing, Cho began coaching at Ajou University, a team he had played for during his youth career. He worked as a coach there between 1996 and 2001, before spending a year at the Barcelona Soccer School. In 2004, he took over as manager of Ajou University where he stayed for 7 years, before leaving to supervise all youth soccer in the city of Suwon.

=== Suwon FC ===
Cho Jeok-je took over as Suwon FC (then known as Suwon City FC) manager for the 2012 season. In his first season, they finished 9th in the Korea National league but won the mid-season Korea National League Championship cup competition, defeating Ulsan Hyundai Mipo in the final.

As part of a league restructuring, Suwon FC were promoted to the K League Challenge for the 2013 season. After finishing 4th in 2013 and 6th in 2014, Suwon finished 3rd in 2015 before defeating Daegu FC, Seoul E-Land and Busan IPark in the promotion/relegation playoffs to be promoted to the K League Classic for the first time. Cho also won the 2015 K League Challenge Manager of the Year award after gaining promotion.

In the 2016 season, Suwon FC finished 12th of 12 in their inaugural K League Classic season and were immediately relegated back to the K League Challenge.

Cho Deok-je resigned towards the end of the 2017 season with Suwon outside of the playoffs.

After leaving Suwon FC, Cho served as chairman of the Korean Football Association.

=== Busan IPark ===
On December 20, 2018, Cho was announced as the new manager of K League 2 side Busan IPark replacing Choi Yun-kyum for the 2019 season. Cho Deok-je was already considered a club legend for Busan IPark after playing over 213 games over 8 years when they were known as Daewoo Royals.
