= 2011 Suwon Samsung Bluewings season =

Suwon Bluewings
2011 season
- Chairman: Choi Gee-sung
- Head Coach: Yoon Sung-Hyo
- Stadium: Big Bird
- K-League: 4th
- FA Cup: Runners-up
- League Cup: Semifinals
- Champions League: Semifinals
- Top goalscorer: League: Yeom Ki-Hun (9); Stevica Ristić (9); All: Yeom Ki-Hun (13)
- Highest home attendance: 44,537 vs Seoul (October 3)
- Lowest home attendance: 2,832 vs Pocheon (May 18)
- Average home league attendance: 18,254
Home colours	Away colours

The 2011 Suwon Samsung Bluewings season was the Suwon Samsung Bluewings' sixteenth season in the K-League. The club competed in the K-League, League Cup, Korean FA Cup and the AFC Champions League.

== Current squad ==
As of 21 September 2011

Note: Flags indicate national team as defined under FIFA eligibility rules; some limited exceptions apply. Players may hold more than one non-FIFA nationality.

No.	Pos.	Nation	Player
1	GK	KOR	Jung Sung-Ryong
2	DF	CRO	Mato Neretljak
3	DF	KOR	Yang Sang-Min
5	MF	KOR	Park Hyun-Beom
6	MF	KOR	Lee Yong-Rae
7	FW	BRA	Diego Oliveira (On loan from Noroeste)
8	MF	KOR	Lee Sang-ho
9	MF	KOR	Oh Jang-Eun
11	FW	MKD	Stevica Ristić
12	FW	KOR	Lee Hyun-Jin
14	DF	KOR	Oh Beom-Seok
15	MF	KOR	Hong Soon-Hak
16	MF	KOR	Cho Ji-Hun
17	FW	UZB	Alexander Geynrikh (on loan from Pakhtakor)
18	MF	KOR	Park Jong-Jin
19	FW	KOR	Cho Yong-Tae
20	MF	KOR	Baek Ji-Hoon
21	GK	KOR	Kim Dae-Hwan
24	DF	KOR	Hwang Jae-Won

No.	Pos.	Nation	Player
25	DF	KOR	Choi Sung-Hwan
26	FW	KOR	Yeom Ki-Hun (captain)
27	MF	KOR	Im Kyung-Hyun
28	FW	KOR	Ha Tae-Goon
29	DF	KOR	Kwak Hee-Ju
30	MF	KOR	Shin Se-Gye
31	GK	KOR	Kwon Tae-Ahn
32	MF	KOR	Lee Jae-Il
33	FW	KOR	Lee Jong-Sung
34	DF	KOR	Kim Seung-Min
35	MF	KOR	Shin Yeon-Soo
36	MF	KOR	Koo Ja-Ryoung
37	FW	KOR	Shin Kyeong-Mo
39	DF	KOR	Min Sang-Gi
41	MF	KOR	Lee Chong-Hee
42	DF	KOR	Heo Cheong-San
43	DF	KOR	Noh Hyung-Goo
44	GK	KOR	Yang Dong-Won

=== Out on loan & military service ===
Note: Flags indicate national team as defined under FIFA eligibility rules; some limited exceptions apply. Players may hold more than one non-FIFA nationality.

No.	Pos.	Nation	Player
4	MF	KOR	Kim Do-Heon (to (South Korea) National Police Agency FC for military service)
17	DF	KOR	Oh Jae-Seok (to (South Korea) Gangwon FC)

== Match results ==
=== K-League ===
Date Round	Home	Score	Away	Location

6 March 1	FC Seoul	0–2	Suwon Samsung Bluewings	Mapo-gu, Seoul
14:00 UTC+9		Report	Geynrikh 40'; Oh Jang-Eun 60'	Stadium: Seoul World Cup Stadium; Attendance: 51,606; Referee: Choi Myung-Yong

12 March 2	Suwon Samsung Bluewings	2–1	Gwangju FC	Suwon, Gyeonggi
15:00 UTC+9	Neretljak 75', 80' (pen.)	Report	Kim Dong-Sub (0:25)	Stadium: Suwon World Cup Stadium; Attendance: 31,506; Referee: Lee Sang-Yong

20 March 3	Pohang Steelers	2–0	Suwon Samsung Bluewings	Pohang, Gyeongbuk
15:00 UTC+9	Kim Jae-Sung 19'; Shin Hyung-Min 87'	Report		Stadium: Steelyard Stadium; Attendance: 14,812; Referee: Lee Sam-Ho

2 April 4	Suwon Samsung Bluewings	2–1	Ulsan Hyundai	Suwon, Gyeonggi
15:00 UTC+9	Oh Jang-Eun 54'; Neretljak 75' (pen.)	Report	Kim Shin-Wook 67'	Stadium: Suwon World Cup Stadium; Attendance: 26,234; Referee: Lee Min-Hu

10 April 5	Jeonbuk Hyundai Motors	0–0	Suwon Samsung Bluewings	Jeonju, Jeonbuk
15:00 UTC+9		Report		Stadium: Jeonju World Cup Stadium; Attendance: 26,597; Referee: Choi Kwang-Bo

15 April 6	Suwon Samsung Bluewings	2–0	Gangwon FC	Suwon, Gyeonggi
19:30 UTC+9	Neretljak 43'; Choi Sung-Kuk 56'; Ha Tae-Gyun (red card) 87'	Report		Stadium: Suwon World Cup Stadium; Attendance: 19,121; Referee: Yoo Seon-Ho

24 April 7	Suwon Samsung Bluewings	1–2	Gyeongnam FC	Suwon, Gyeonggi
19:30 UTC+9	Lee Yong-Gi 65' (o.g.)	Report	Han Kyung-In 50'; Kim In-Han 53'	Stadium: Suwon World Cup Stadium; Attendance: 20,315; Referee: Choi Myung-Yong

30 April 8	Sangju Sangmu Phoenix	1–0	Suwon Samsung Bluewings	Sangju, Gyeongbuk
15:00 UTC+9	Ko Cha-Won 70'	Report		Stadium: Sangju Stadium; Attendance: 5,948; Referee: Lee Sam-Ho

7 May 9	Suwon Samsung Bluewings	1–2	Chunnam Dragons	Suwon, Gyeonggi
19:30 UTC+9	Kwak Hee-Ju 22'	Report	Ji Dong-Won 47'; Lee Hyun-Seung 56'	Stadium: Suwon World Cup Stadium; Attendance: 38,068; Referee: Choi Kwang-Bo

15 May 10	Seongnam Ilhwa Chunma	1–1	Suwon Samsung Bluewings	Seongnam, Gyeonggi
17:00 UTC+9	Ognenovski 57' (pen.)	Report	Geynrikh 87'	Stadium: Tancheon Sports Complex; Attendance: 12,131; Referee: Yoo Seon-Ho

21 May 11	Suwon Samsung Bluewings	1–2	Busan I'Park	Suwon, Gyeonggi
19:30 UTC+9	Kim Han-Yoon 64' (o.g.); Hwang Jae-Won (yellow card) 53' (yellow-red card) 76'; Hong Soon-Hak (yellow card) 71' (yellow-red card) 86'	Report	Lee Jung-Ho 13'; Yang Dong-Hyun 87' (pen.)	Stadium: Suwon World Cup Stadium; Attendance: 18,714; Referee: Choi Myung-Yong

29 May 12	Incheon United	2–1	Suwon Samsung Bluewings	Seo-gu, Incheon
15:00 UTC+9	Jang Won-Seok 2'; Kapadze 32' (pen.)	Report	Yeom Ki-Hun 15'	Stadium: Incheon Munhak Stadium; Attendance: 10,582; Referee: Kim Sung-Ho

11 June 13	Jeju United	3–2	Suwon Samsung Bluewings	Seogwipo, Jeju
15:00 UTC+9	Jair 44'; Santos 62'; Kwon Yong-Nam 90+1'	Report	Geynrikh 6'; Park Jong-Jin 65'	Stadium: Jeju World Cup Stadium; Attendance: 2,712; Referee: Yoo Seon-Ho

18 June 14	Suwon Samsung Bluewings	4–1	Daegu FC	Suwon, Gyeonggi
19:30 UTC+9	Yeom Ki-Hun 14', 62' (pen.), 65'; Marcel 26'	Report	Kim Hyun-Sung 11'	Stadium: Suwon World Cup Stadium; Attendance: 17,145; Referee: Ahn Yong-Hee

25 June 15	Daejeon Citizen	1–3	Suwon Samsung Bluewings	Yuseong-gu, Daejeon
19:00 UTC+9	Park Sung-Ho 62'; Lee Ho (yellow card) 61' (yellow-red card) 63'	Report	Yang Joon-A 11'; Lee Sang-ho 39'; Ha Tae-Gyun 90+1'	Stadium: Daejeon World Cup Stadium; Attendance: 4,771; Referee: Moon Jin-Hee

2 July 16	Suwon Samsung Bluewings	2–1	Pohang Steelers	Suwon, Gyeonggi
19:30 UTC+9	Marcel 3', 67'	Report	Kim Jae-Sung 44'	Stadium: Suwon World Cup Stadium; Attendance: 27,152; Referee: Choi Kwang-Bo

10 July 17	Chunnam Dragons	3–1	Suwon Samsung Bluewings	Gwangyang, Jeonnam
19:00 UTC+9	Shin Young-Jun 61'; Yoon Suk-Young 74'; Wesley 83'	Report	Ristić 45+2'	Stadium: Gwangyang Stadium; Attendance: 5,080; Referee: Lee Min-Hu

16 July 18	Suwon Samsung Bluewings	1–0	Incheon United	Suwon, Gyeonggi
19:30 UTC+9	Ristić 34'	Report		Stadium: Suwon World Cup Stadium; Attendance: 17,088; Referee: Choi Myung-Yong

23 July 19	Busan I'Park	4–3	Suwon Samsung Bluewings	Yeonje-gu, Busan
19:00 UTC+9	Lim Sang-Hyub 45+2'; Yang Dong-Hyun 69'; Fagner 76', 85'	Report	Ristić 22' (pen.); Lee Sang-ho 80'; Ha Tae-Gyun 83'	Stadium: Busan Asiad Stadium; Attendance: 8,143; Referee: Ryu Hee-Sun

6 August 20	Suwon Samsung Bluewings	4–0	Daejeon Citizen	Suwon, Gyeonggi
19:30 UTC+9	Kwak Hee-Joo 8'; Yeom Ki-Hun 56'; Lee Sang-ho 69', 90+1'	Report		Stadium: Suwon World Cup Stadium; Attendance: 24,451; Referee: Choi Kwang-Bo

13 August 21	Gyeongnam	0–2	Suwon Samsung Bluewings	Changwon, Gyeongnam
19:30 UTC+9		Report	Ristić 20'; Kwak Hee-Joo 71'	Stadium: Changwon Football Center; Attendance: 7,809; Referee: Ahn Yong-Hee

20 August 22	Suwon Samsung Bluewings	3–0	Sangju Sangmu Phoenix	Suwon, Gyeonggi
18:00 UTC+9	Yeom Ki-Hun 19' (pen.); Ristić 30'; Lee Sang-ho 90' (pen.)	Report		Stadium: Suwon World Cup Stadium; Attendance: 26,989; Referee: Lee Min-Hu

27 August 23	Ulsan Hyundai	1–1	Suwon Samsung Bluewings	Nam-gu, Ulsan
19:00 UTC+9	Lee Jin-Ho 34'	Report	Oh Jang-Eun 78'	Stadium: Munsu Cup Stadium; Attendance: 21,753; Referee: Choi Kwang-Bo

10 September 24	Suwon Samsung Bluewings	3–2	Seongnam Ilhwa Chunma	Suwon, Gyeonggi
18:00 UTC+9	Ristić 13'; Yeom Ki-Hun 24'; Oh Jang-Eun 84'	Report	Ognenovski 48', 90+2'; Hong Cheol (red card) 86'	Stadium: Suwon World Cup Stadium; Attendance: 15,787; Referee: Lee Sam-Ho

18 September 25	Gangwon	0–1	Suwon Samsung Bluewings	Gangneung, Gangwon
15:00 UTC+9		Report	Neretljak 6'	Stadium: Gangneung Stadium; Attendance: 3,508; Referee: Woo Sang-Il

24 September 26	Daegu	1–2	Suwon Samsung Bluewings	Buk-gu, Daegu
19:00 UTC+9	Song Je-Heon 90+1'	Report	Yeom Ki-Hun 23'; Lee Sang-ho 75'	Stadium: Daegu Civil Stadium; Attendance: 14,326; Referee: Choi Myung-Yong

3 October 27	Suwon Samsung Bluewings	1–0	FC Seoul	Suwon, Gyeonggi
15:30 UTC+9	Ristić 78'	Report		Stadium: Suwon World Cup Stadium; Attendance: 44,537; Referee: Choi Kwang-Bo

8 October 28	Suwon Samsung Bluewings	2–2	Jeonbuk Hyundai Motors	Suwon, Gyeonggi
15:00 UTC+9	Yeom Ki-Hun 20'; Neretljak 33' (pen.)	Report	Choi Chul-Soon 16'; Eninho 84'	Stadium: Suwon World Cup Stadium; Attendance: 13,004; Referee: Ko Keum-Bok

23 October 29	Gwangju	0–1	Suwon Samsung Bluewings	Seo-gu, Gwangju
15:00 UTC+9		Report	Ristić 9'; Shin Se-Gye (yellow card) 19' (yellow-red card) 88'	Stadium: Gwangju World Cup Stadium; Attendance: 24,778; Referee: Ahn Yong-Hee

30 October 30	Suwon Samsung Bluewings	2–0	Jeju United	Suwon, Gyeonggi
15:00 UTC+9	Neretljak 30'; Ristić 89'	Report		Stadium: Suwon World Cup Stadium; Attendance: 20,197; Referee: Choi Kwang-Bo

==== League table ====
Pos	Team	Pld	W	D	L	GF	GA	GD	Pts	Qualification
2	Pohang Steelers	30	17	8	5	59	33	+26	59	Qualification for the K League playoffs semi-final
3	FC Seoul	30	16	7	7	56	38	+18	55	Qualification for the K League playoffs first round
4	Suwon Samsung Bluewings	30	17	4	9	51	33	+18	55	Qualification for the K League playoffs first round
5	Busan IPark	30	13	7	10	49	43	+6	46	Qualification for the K League playoffs first round
6	Ulsan Hyundai	30	13	7	10	33	29	+4	46	Qualification for the K League playoffs first round

Source: K League
Rules for classification: 1) Points; 2) Goal difference; 3) Goals scored

Pos	Team	Qualification
1	Jeonbuk Hyundai Motors (C)	Qualification for the Champions League group stage
2	Ulsan Hyundai	Qualification for the Champions League group stage
3	Pohang Steelers	Qualification for the Champions League playoff round
4	Suwon Samsung Bluewings	
5	FC Seoul	
6	Busan IPark	

Source: RSSSF
(C) Champions

==== Results summary ====
Overall								Home						Away					
Pld	W	D	L	GF	GA	GD	Pts	W	D	L	GF	GA	GD	W	D	L	GF	GA	GD
30	17	4	9	51	33	+18	55	10	1	3	29	14	+15	7	3	6	22	19	+3

==== Results by round ====
Round	1	2	3	4	5	6	7	8	9	10	11	12	13	14	15	16	17	18	19	20	21	22	23	24	25	26	27	28	29	30
Ground	A	H	A	H	A	H	H	A	H	A	H	A	A	H	A	H	A	H	A	H	A	H	A	H	A	A	H	H	A	H
Result	W	W	L	W	D	W	L	L	L	D	L	L	L	W	W	W	L	W	L	W	W	W	D	W	W	W	W	D	W	W
Position	1	1	7	3	4	2	4	4	6	8	10	12	14	11	7	5	9	8	9	8	6	5	4	4	4	4	3	3	3	4

Updated to match(es) played on 30 October 2011. Source: League Fixtures and Results
A = Away; H = Home; W = Win; D = Draw; L = Loss

=== K-League Championship ===
20 November First round	Suwon Samsung Bluewings	1–0	Busan I'Park	Suwon, Gyeonggi
15:00 UTC+9	Ha Tae-Gyun 45+2'	Report		Stadium: Suwon World Cup Stadium; Attendance: 23,903; Referee: Choi Myung-Yong

23 November Second round	Suwon Samsung Bluewings	1–1 (a.e.t.) (1–3 p)	Ulsan Hyundai	Suwon, Gyeonggi
19:30 UTC+9	Mato 83' (pen.)	Report	Kim Shin-Wook 21'	Stadium: Suwon World Cup Stadium; Attendance: 15,862; Referee: Choi Kwang-Bo
	Penalties
	Mato (penalty scored); Yeom Ki-Hun (penalty missed); Yang Sang-Min (penalty missed); Choi Sung-Hwan (penalty missed)		(penalty missed) Seol Ki-Hyeon; (penalty scored) Lucio; (penalty scored) Kim Shin-Wook; (penalty scored) Go Seul-Ki

=== Korean FA Cup ===
18 May Round of 32	Suwon Samsung Bluewings	3–1	FC Pocheon	Suwon, Gyeonggi
19:30 UTC+9	Bergson 61'; Park Jong-Jin 69'; Choi Sung-Kuk 78'		Kim Young-Joong 88'	Stadium: Suwon World Cup Stadium; Attendance: 2,832; Referee: Kim Myung-Jae

15 June Round of 16	Suwon City	0–1	Suwon Samsung Bluewings	Suwon, Gyeonggi
19:00 UTC+9			Oh Jang-Eun 72'	Stadium: Suwon Civic Stadium; Attendance: 2,642; Referee: Choi Dae-Woo

27 July Quarterfinal	Suwon Samsung Bluewings	1–0	Chunnam Dragons	Suwon, Gyeonggi
19:00 UTC+9	Lee Yong-Rae 25'; Choi Sung-Hwan (yellow card) 48' (yellow-red card) 64'			Stadium: Suwon World Cup Stadium; Attendance: 5,867; Referee: Kim Jong-Hyuk

24 August Semifinal	Suwon Samsung Bluewings	3–2 (a.e.t.)	Ulsan Hyundai	Suwon, Gyeonggi
19:30 UTC+9	Ristić 76'; Neretljak 82'; Park Hyun-Beom 111'		Seol Ki-Hyeon 58', 74'; Go Seul-Ki (yellow card) 65' (yellow-red card) 68'	Stadium: Suwon World Cup Stadium; Attendance: 14,698; Referee: Kim Dong-Jin

15 October Final	Seongnam Ilhwa Chunma	1–0	Suwon Samsung Bluewings	Seongnam, Gyeonggi
14:00 UTC+9	Cho Dong-Geon 76'		Geynrikh (red card) 90+'	Stadium: Tancheon Sports Complex; Attendance: 14,756; Referee: Kim Jong-Kyuk

=== League Cup ===
29 June Quarterfinal	Jeju United	0–0 (a.e.t.) (2–4 p)	Suwon Samsung Bluewings	Seogwipo, Jeju
19:00 UTC+9		Report		Stadium: Jeju World Cup Stadium; Attendance: 2,822; Referee: Kim Sung-Ho
	Penalties
	Han Jae-Man (penalty missed); Ma Chul-Jun (penalty scored); Felipinho (penalty scored); Kang Su-Il (penalty missed)		(penalty scored) Woo Seung-Je; (penalty scored) Choi Sung-Hwan; (penalty missed) Shin Yeon-Soo; (penalty scored) No Hyung-Goo; (penalty scored) Yang Sang-Min

6 July Semifinal	Busan I'Park	2–1	Suwon Samsung Bluewings	Yeonje-gu, Busan
20:00 UTC+9	Lim Sang-Hyub 43'; Kim Han-Yoon 90'	Report	Yang Joon-A 7'	Stadium: Busan Asiad Stadium; Attendance: 1,878; Referee: Yoo Seon-Ho

=== AFC Champions League ===
==== Group stage ====
Pos	Team	Pld	W	D	L	GF	GA	GD	Pts	Qualification
1	(South Korea) Suwon Samsung Bluewings	6	3	3	0	12	3	+9	12 (Note: Tiebreakers: Suwon Samsung Bluewings and Kashima Antlers are also tied on their head-to-head records (2 pts, 0 GD, 2 GF), and so are ranked by their overall goal difference.)	Advance to knockout stage
2	(Japan) Kashima Antlers	6	3	3	0	9	3	+6	12	Advance to knockout stage
3	(Australia) Sydney FC	6	1	2	3	6	11	−5	5	
4	(China) Shanghai Shenhua	6	0	2	4	3	13	−10	2	

Notes:

2 March Group round	Sydney FC (Australia)	0–0	(South Korea) Suwon Samsung Bluewings	Sydney, Australia
20:00 UTC+11	McFlynn (red card) 33'	Report		Stadium: Sydney Football Stadium; Attendance: 7,095; Referee: Abdul Malik (Singapore)

16 March Group round	Suwon Samsung Bluewings (South Korea)	4–0	(China) Shanghai Shenhua	Suwon, South Korea
19:30 UTC+9	Ha Tae-Gyun 3', 61', 75'; Oh Jang-Eun 44'	Report		Stadium: Suwon World Cup Stadium; Attendance: 5,393; Referee: Mohamed Al Zarooni (UAE)

6 April Group round	Suwon Samsung Bluewings (South Korea)	1–1	(Japan) Kashima Antlers	Suwon, South Korea
19:30 UTC+9	Yeom Ki-Hun 67'	Report	Koji Nakata 71'	Stadium: Suwon World Cup Stadium; Attendance: 7,689; Referee: Abdullah Al Hilali (Oman)

19 April Group round	Kashima Antlers (Japan)	1–1	(South Korea) Suwon Samsung Bluewings	Tokyo, Japan
15:00 UTC+9	Yūzō Tashiro 55'	Report	Yeom Ki-Hun 48'	Stadium: National Olympic Stadium; Attendance: 4,619; Referee: Abdulrahman Abdou (Qatar)

3 May Group round	Suwon Samsung Bluewings (South Korea)	3–1	(Australia) Sydney FC	Suwon, South Korea
19:30 UTC+9	Ha Tae-Gyun 34'; Neretljak 50'; Yeom Ki-Hoon 80'	Report	Bruno Cazarine 51'	Stadium: Suwon World Cup Stadium; Attendance: 9,495; Referee: Ravshan Irmatov (Uzbekistan)

10 May Group round	Shanghai Shenhua (China)	0–3	(South Korea) Suwon Samsung Bluewings	Shanghai, China PR
20:00 UTC+8		Report	Ha Tae-Gyun 13', 55'; Shin Se-Gye 89'	Stadium: Hongkou Stadium; Attendance: 6,730; Referee: Mohsen Torky (Iran)

==== Knockout round ====
25 May Round of 16	Suwon Samsung Bluewings (South Korea)	2–0	(Japan) Nagoya Grampus	Suwon, South Korea
19:30 UTC+9	Yeom Ki-Hun 23'; Lee Sang-ho 57'	Report		Stadium: Suwon World Cup Stadium; Attendance: 11,036; Referee: Abdulrahman Abdou (Qatar)

14 September Quarter-finals 1st	Suwon Samsung Bluewings (South Korea)	1–1	(Iran) Zob Ahan	Suwon, South Korea
19:30 UTC+9	Park Hyun-Beom 66'	Report	Ghazi 57'	Stadium: Suwon World Cup Stadium; Attendance: 7,659; Referee: Masaaki Toma (Japan)

28 September Quarter-finals 2nd	Zob Ahan (Iran)	1–2 (a.e.t.)	(South Korea) Suwon Samsung Bluewings	Isfahan, Iran
17:20 UTC+3:30	Ghazi 50'	Report	Yang Sang-Min 77'; Neretljak 99' (pen.)	Stadium: Foolad Shahr Stadium; Attendance: 7,250; Referee: Khalil Al Ghamdi (Saudi Arabia)

19 October Semi-finals 1st	Suwon Samsung Bluewings (South Korea)	0–2	(Qatar) Al-Sadd	Suwon, South Korea
19:30 UTC+9	Ristić (red card) 89'	Report	Niang 70', 81' (yellow card) 74' (yellow-red card) 90+6'; Keïta (red card) 89'	Stadium: Suwon World Cup Stadium; Attendance: 9,864; Referee: Malik Abdul Bashir (Singapore)

26 October Semi-finals 2nd	Al-Sadd (Qatar)	0–1	(South Korea) Suwon Samsung Bluewings	Doha, Qatar
18:00 UTC+9		Report	Oh Jang-Eun 7'	Stadium: Jassim Bin Hamad Stadium; Attendance: 10,800; Referee: Ali Al Badwawi (UAE)

== Squad statistics ==
=== Appearances and goals ===
Statistics accurate as of match played 23 November 2011
Numbers in parentheses denote appearances as substitute.

No.	Nat.	Pos.	Name	League		FA Cup		League Cup		Champions League		Total	
No.	Nat.	Pos.	Name	Apps	Goals	Apps	Goals	Apps	Goals	Apps	Goals	Apps	Goals
1	KOR	GK	Jung Sung-Ryong	30	0	5	0	1	0	10	0	46 (0)	0
2	CRO	DF	Mato Neretljak	25	8	3	1	0	0	9	2	37 (0)	11
3	KOR	DF	Yang Sang-Min	17 (6)	0	1 (1)	0	1	0	8	1	27 (7)	1
5	KOR	MF	Park Hyun-Beom	12 (1)	0	3	1	0	0	4	1	19 (1)	2
6	KOR	MF	Lee Yong-Rae	28	0	3	1	0	0	10	0	41 (0)	1
7	BRA	FW	Diego Oliveira	1 (3)	0	0 (1)	0	0	0	1	0	2 (4)	0
8	KOR	MF	Lee Sang-ho	27 (1)	6	3 (1)	0	1	0	9	1	40 (2)	7
9	KOR	MF	Oh Jang-Eun	29 (1)	4	3 (1)	1	0	0	9	2	41 (2)	7
11	MKD	FW	Stevica Ristić	13	9	2	1	0	0	3	0	18 (0)	10
12	KOR	FW	Lee Hyun-Jin	0 (6)	0	0 (1)	0	0	0	0 (4)	0	0 (11)	0
14	KOR	DF	Oh Beom-Seok	28	0	4	0	1	0	8	0	41 (0)	0
15	KOR	MF	Hong Soon-Hak	12	0	3	0	0	0	4 (1)	0	19 (1)	0
16	KOR	MF	Cho Ji-Hun	1	0	1	0	0	0	1	0	3 (0)	0
17	UZB	FW	Alexander Geynrikh	6 (13)	3	1 (1)	0	1	0	0 (3)	0	8 (17)	3
18	KOR	MF	Park Jong-Jin	14 (6)	1	4	1	1	0	5 (4)	0	24 (10)	2
19	KOR	FW	Cho Yong-Tae	0 (2)	0	0	0	0	0	0	0	0 (2)	0
20	KOR	MF	Baek Ji-Hoon	0	0	0	0	0	0	0	0	0	0
21	KOR	GK	Kim Dae-Hwan	0	0	0	0	0	0	1	0	1 (0)	0
24	KOR	DF	Hwang Jae-Won	9	0	0	0	0	0	5 (1)	0	14 (1)	0
25	KOR	DF	Choi Sung-Hwan	9 (10)	0	2 (2)	0	2	0	4 (1)	0	17 (13)	0
26	KOR	FW	Yeom Ki-Hun	28 (1)	9	4 (1)	0	0	0	9 (2)	4	41 (4)	13
27	KOR	MF	Im Kyung-Hyun	2 (1)	0	0	0	0	0	0	0	2 (1)	0
28	KOR	FW	Ha Tae-Goon	5 (12)	3	0 (3)	0	0 (2)	0	6 (2)	6	11 (19)	9
29	KOR	DF	Kwak Hee-Ju	19	3	4	0	0	0	5 (1)	0	28 (1)	3
30	KOR	MF	Shin Se-Gye	8 (2)	0	1	0	1	0	2 (1)	1	12 (3)	1
31	KOR	GK	Kwon Tae-Ahn	0	0	0	0	0	0	0	0	0	0
32	KOR	MF	Lee Jae-Il	0	0	1	0	2	0	0 (1)	0	3 (1)	0
33	KOR	FW	Lee Jong-Sung	0	0	0	0	2	0	0 (1)	0	2 (1)	0
34	KOR	DF	Kim Seung-Min	0	0	0	0	0	0	0	0	0	0
35	KOR	MF	Shin Yeon-Soo	0	0	0	0	0 (1)	0	0	0	0 (1)	0
36	KOR	MF	Koo Ja-Ryoung	0	0	0	0	0 (1)	0	0	0	0 (1)	0
37	KOR	FW	Shin Kyeong-Mo	0	0	0	0	2	0	0	0	2 (0)	0
39	KOR	DF	Min Sang-Gi	0 (1)	0	1	0	0	0	1	0	2 (1)	0
41	KOR	MF	Lee Chong-Hee	0	0	0	0	1	0	0	0	1 (0)	0
42	KOR	DF	Heo Cheong-San	0	0	0	0	0	0	0	0	0	0
43	KOR	DF	Noh Hyung-Goo	0	0	0	0	2	0	0	0	2 (0)	0
44	KOR	GK	Yang Dong-Won	2	0	0	0	1	0	0	0	3 (0)	0
7	BRA	FW	Wando (out)	0	0	0	0	0	0	0	0	0	0
7	BRA	FW	Marcel (out)	11	3	2	0	0	0	0	0	13 (0)	3
10	KOR	FW	Choi Sung-Kuk (out)	7 (5)	1	1	1	0	0	5 (1)	0	13 (6)	2
11	BRA	FW	Bergson (out)	1 (6)	0	0 (1)	1	1	0	0 (2)	0	2 (9)	1
13	KOR	MF	Lee Kyung-Hwan (out)	0 (1)	0	0	0	1	0	0 (1)	0	1 (2)	0
22	KOR	DF	Woo Seung-Jea (out)	5 (8)	0	1 (1)	0	0 (2)	0	2 (3)	0	8 (14)	0
23	KOR	MF	Yang Jun-A (out)	4 (2)	1	1 (1)	0	1	1	0 (2)	0	6 (5)	2
40	KOR	GK	Lee Sang-Ki (out)	0	0	0	0	0	0	0	0	0	0

=== Top scorers ===
Rank	Nation	Number	Name	K-League	KFA Cup	League Cup	Champions League	Total
1	(South Korea)	26	Yeom Ki-Hun	9	0	0	4	13
2	(Croatia)	2	Mato Neretljak	8	1	0	2	11
3	(North Macedonia)	11	Stevica Ristić	9	1	0	0	10
4	(South Korea)	28	Ha Tae-Goon	3	0	0	6	9
5	(South Korea)	8	Lee Sang-ho	6	0	0	1	7
=	(South Korea)	9	Oh Jang-Eun	4	1	0	2	7
6	(Brazil)	7	Marcel	3	0	0	0	3
=	(Uzbekistan)	17	Alexander Geynrikh	3	0	0	0	3
=	(South Korea)	29	Kwak Hee-Joo	3	0	0	0	3
7	(South Korea)	10	Choi Sung-Kuk	1	1	0	0	2
=	(South Korea)	18	Park Jong-Jin	1	1	0	0	2
=	(South Korea)	23	Yang Joon-A	1	0	1	0	2
=	(South Korea)	5	Park Hyun-Beom	0	1	0	1	2
8	(South Korea)	6	Lee Yong-Rae	0	1	0	0	1
=	(Brazil)	11	Bergson	0	1	0	0	1
=	(South Korea)	3	Yang Sang-Min	0	0	0	1	1
=	(South Korea)	30	Shin Se-Gye	0	0	0	1	1
/	/	/	Own Goals	2	0	0	0	2
/	/	/	TOTALS	53	8	1	18	80

=== Top assistors ===
Rank	Nation	Number	Name	K-League	KFA Cup	League Cup	Champions League	Total
1	(South Korea)	26	Yeom Ki-Hun	14	0	0	3	17
2	(South Korea)	18	Park Jong-Jin	2	0	0	3	5
3	(South Korea)	6	Lee Yong-Rae	3	0	0	1	4
4	(South Korea)	8	Lee Sang-ho	3	0	0	0	3
=	(South Korea)	10	Choi Sung-Kuk	2	0	0	1	3
=	(South Korea)	14	Oh Beom-Seok	1	0	0	2	3
5	(South Korea)	5	Park Hyun-Beom	2	0	0	0	2
=	(Brazil)	7	Marcel	2	0	0	0	2
=	(South Korea)	9	Oh Jang-Eun	2	0	0	0	2
=	(North Macedonia)	11	Stevica Ristić	1	1	0	0	2
=	(South Korea)	28	Ha Tae-Gyun	1	0	0	1	2
6	(South Korea)	3	Yang Sang-Min	1	0	0	0	1
=	(South Korea)	15	Hong Soon-Hak	1	0	0	0	1
=	(South Korea)	27	Im Kyung-Hyun	1	0	0	0	1
=	(South Korea)	22	Woo Seung-Je	0	1	0	0	1
=	(Croatia)	2	Mato Neretljak	0	0	0	1	1
=	(South Korea)	24	Hwang Jae-Won	0	0	0	1	1
/	/	/	TOTALS	36	2	0	13	51

=== Discipline ===
Position	Nation	Number	Name	K-League		KFA Cup		League Cup		Champions League		Total	
Position	Nation	Number	Name	Booked	Sent off (straight red)	Booked	Sent off (straight red)	Booked	Sent off (straight red)	Booked	Sent off (straight red)	Booked	Sent off (straight red)
GK	(South Korea)	1	Jung Sung-Ryong	2	0	0	0	0	0	0	0	2	0
DF	(Croatia)	2	Mato Neretljak	6	0	1	0	0	0	2	0	9	0
DF	(South Korea)	3	Yang Sang-Min	9	0	0	0	0	0	2	0	11	0
MF	(South Korea)	5	Park Hyun-Beom	2	0	0	0	0	0	0	0	2	0
MF	(South Korea)	6	Lee Yong-Rae	4	0	1	0	0	0	1	0	6	0
FW	(Brazil)	7	Marcel	2	0	0	0	0	0	0	0	2	0
MF	(South Korea)	8	Lee Sang-ho	5	0	0	0	0	0	1	0	6	0
MF	(South Korea)	9	Oh Jang-Eun	2	0	0	0	0	0	0	0	2	0
FW	(South Korea)	10	Choi Sung-Kuk	2	0	1	0	0	0	0	0	3	0
FW	(Brazil)	11	Bergson	1	0	0	0	1	0	1	0	3	0
FW	(North Macedonia)	11	Stevica Ristić	2	0	0	0	0	0	1	1	3	1
DF	(South Korea)	14	Oh Beom-Seok	6	0	0	0	0	0	3	0	9	0
MF	(South Korea)	15	Hong Soon-Hak	4	1	1	0	0	0	0	0	5	1
FW	(Uzbekistan)	17	Alexander Geynrikh	5	0	1	1	0	0	0	0	6	1
MF	(South Korea)	18	Park Jong-Jin	3	0	0	0	0	0	3	0	6	0
MF	(South Korea)	22	Woo Seung-Je	0	0	0	0	0	0	1	0	1	0
MF	(South Korea)	23	Yang Joon-A	1	0	2	0	1	0	0	0	4	0
DF	(South Korea)	24	Hwang Jae-Won	2	1	0	0	0	0	1	0	3	1
DF	(South Korea)	25	Choi Sung-Hwan	7	0	3	1	2	0	2	0	14	1
MF	(South Korea)	27	Im Kyung-Hyun	2	0	0	0	0	0	0	0	2	0
FW	(South Korea)	28	Ha Tae-Gyun	2	1	0	0	1	0	1	0	4	1
DF	(South Korea)	29	Kwak Hee-Ju	3	0	2	0	0	0	0	0	5	0
DF	(South Korea)	30	Shin Se-Gye	6	1	0	0	0	0	1	0	7	1
MF	(South Korea)	32	Lee Jae-Il	0	0	0	0	1	0	0	0	1	0
FW	(South Korea)	33	Lee Jong-Sung	0	0	0	0	1	0	0	0	1	0
DF	(South Korea)	43	Noh Hyung-Goo	0	0	0	0	1	0	0	0	1	0
/	/	/	TOTALS	78	4	12	2	8	0	20	1	118	7

== Transfers ==
=== In ===
Note: Flags indicate national team as defined under FIFA eligibility rules; some limited exceptions apply. Players may hold more than one non-FIFA nationality.

No.	Pos.	Nation	Player
—	MF	KOR	Lee Yong-Rae (Transferred from Gyeongnam FC)
—	FW	KOR	Choi Sung-Kuk (Transferred from Seongnam Ilhwa Chunma)
—	DF	KOR	Oh Beom-Seok (Transferred from Ulsan Hyundai)
—	GK	KOR	Jung Sung-Ryong (Transferred from Seongnam Ilhwa Chunma)
—	MF	KOR	Oh Jang-Eun (Transferred from Ulsan Hyundai)
—	DF	KOR	Woo Seung-Je (Transferred from Daejeon Citizen)
—	MF	KOR	Lee Kyung-Hwan (Transferred from Daejeon Citizen)
—	GK	KOR	Lee Sang-Ki (Transferred from Seongnam Ilhwa Chunma)
—	GK	KOR	Yang Dong-Won (Transferred from Daejeon Citizen)
—	DF	CRO	Mato Neretljak (Transferred from Omiya Ardija)
—	FW	BRA	Bergson (Loan from Grêmio)
—	FW	BRA	Wando (Transferred from Saba Qom)
—	FW	UZB	Alexander Geynrikh (Loan from Pakhtakor Tashkent)
—	GK	KOR	Kwon Tae-Ahn (Promoted from Youth team)
—	DF	KOR	Noh Hyung-Goo (Promoted from Youth team)
—	DF	KOR	Kim Seung-Min (Promoted from Youth team)
—	MF	KOR	Koo Ja-Ryoung (Promoted from Youth team)
—	FW	KOR	Lee Jong-Sung (Promoted from Youth team)
—	MF	KOR	Shin Yeon-Soo (Promoted from Youth team)
—	MF	KOR	Cho Ji-Hun (Drafted from Yonsei University)
—	MF	KOR	Shin Se-Gye (Drafted from Sungkyunkwan University)
—	MF	KOR	Lee Jae-Il (Drafted from Sungkyunkwan University)
—	FW	KOR	Shin Kyeong-Mo (Drafted from Chung-Ang University)
—	DF	KOR	Heo Cheong-San (Drafted from Myongji University)
—	MF	KOR	Lee Chong-Hee (Drafted from Tongjin High School)
—	FW	MKD	Stevica Ristić (Transferred from FC Amkar Perm (10 July 2011))
—	MF	KOR	Park Hyun-Beom (Transferred from Jeju United FC (20 July 2011))
—	FW	BRA	Diego Oliveira (Loan from Noroeste (26 July 2011))

=== Out ===
Note: Flags indicate national team as defined under FIFA eligibility rules; some limited exceptions apply. Players may hold more than one non-FIFA nationality.

No.	Pos.	Nation	Player
1	GK	KOR	Lee Woon-Jae (Transferred to Chunnam Dragons)
3	FW	KOR	Shin Young-Rok (Transferred to Jeju United)
4	MF	KOR	Kim Do-Heon (Loan to National Police Agency FC for military service)
5	DF	CHN	Li Weifeng (Transferred to Tianjin Teda FC)
6	MF	KOR	Cho Won-Hee (Transferred to Guangzhou Evergrande)
8	MF	BRA	Márcio Diogo (Transferred to Ponte Preta)
9	FW	BRA	Jose Mota (Loan return to Molde FK)
13	MF	KOR	Lee Kwan-Woo (Released)
14	DF	KOR	Kang Min-Soo (Transferred to Ulsan Hyundai)
16	DF	KOR	Lee Dong-Sik (Transferred to Busan I'Park)
17	DF	KOR	Oh Jae-Seok (Loan to Gangwon FC)
18	FW	KOR	Yeo Seung-Won (Transferred to Daejeon KHNP)
19	MF	KOR	Kim Dae-Eui (Transferred to Home United)
22	FW	JPN	Naohiro Takahara (Transferred to Shimizu S-Pulse)
24	MF	KOR	Kim Hong-Il (Transferred to Gwangju FC)
30	FW	KOR	Namgung Woong (Transferred to Seongnam Ilhwa Chunma)
31	GK	KOR	Park Ho-Jin (Transferred to Gwangju FC)
32	DF	KOR	Moon Min-Kwi (Transferred to Jeju United)
33	MF	KOR	Park Tae-Min (Transferred to Busan I'Park)
34	MF	KOR	Bae Dae-Won (Transferred to Gimhae City FC)
35	DF	KOR	Lim Young-Woo (Transferred to Balestier Khalsa)
36	DF	KOR	Kim Seon-Il (Released)
37	MF	KOR	Joo Jae-Hyun (Released)
38	DF	KOR	Heo Jae-Won (Transferred to Gwangju FC)
40	GK	KOR	Ha Kang-Jin (Transferred to Seongnam Ilhwa Chunma)
41	GK	KOR	Park Ji-Young (Transferred to Changwon City FC)
45	DF	KOR	Lee Jae-Seong (Transferred to Ulsan Hyundai)
10	FW	KOR	Choi Sung-Kuk (under indictment (7 July 2011))
13	MF	KOR	Lee Kyung-Hwan (under indictment (7 July 2011))
11	FW	BRA	Bergson (Loan return to Grêmio (8 July 2011))
23	MF	KOR	Yang Joon-A (Transferred to Jeju United FC (20 July 2011))
7	FW	BRA	Marcel (Released (25 July 2011))
40	GK	KOR	Lee Sang-Ki (Transferred to Sangju Sangmu Phoenix)
22	DF	KOR	Woo Seung-Je (Dropped out of the club)

== Honours ==
=== Individual ===
- K-League Best XI: (South Korea) Yeom Ki-Hun
