= 2012 Suwon Samsung Bluewings season =

Suwon Bluewings
2012 season
- Chairman: Kwon Oh-hyun
- Head Coach: Yoon Sung-Hyo
- Stadium: Big Bird
- K-League: 4th
- FA Cup: Quarterfinals
- Top goalscorer: League: Dženan Radončić (11); All: Dženan Radončić (12)
- Highest home attendance: 45,192 vs Seoul (April 1)
- Lowest home attendance: 9,227 vs Gangwon (March 17)
- Average home league attendance: 21,445 (as of July 21)
Home colours	Away colours

The 2012 Suwon Samsung Bluewings season was Suwon Samsung Bluewings's seventeenth season in the K-League in South Korea. Suwon Samsung Bluewings is competing K-League and Korean FA Cup.

== Current squad ==
Note: Flags indicate national team as defined under FIFA eligibility rules; some limited exceptions apply. Players may hold more than one non-FIFA nationality.

No.	Pos.	Nation	Player
1	GK	KOR	Jung Sung-Ryong
2	DF	KOR	Choi Jae-Soo
3	DF	KOR	Yang Sang-Min
4	DF	KOR	Kwak Kwang-Seon
5	MF	KOR	Park Hyun-Beom
6	MF	KOR	Lee Yong-Rae
7	FW	KOR	Cho Dong-Geon
8	MF	KOR	Lee Sang-ho
9	MF	KOR	Oh Jang-Eun
10	FW	MNE	Dženan Radončić
11	FW	MKD	Stevica Ristić
12	FW	KOR	Lee Hyun-Jin
13	MF	KOR	Seo Jung-Jin
14	DF	KOR	Oh Beom-Seok
15	MF	KOR	Hong Soon-Hak
16	MF	KOR	Cho Ji-Hun
17	MF	KOR	Park Tae-Woong
18	MF	KOR	Park Jong-Jin
19	FW	KOR	Cho Yong-Tae

No.	Pos.	Nation	Player
21	GK	KOR	Yang Dong-Won
22	FW	BRA	Éverton
23	DF	AUS	Eddy Bosnar
27	MF	KOR	Im Kyung-Hyun
28	FW	KOR	Ha Tae-Goon
29	DF	KOR	Kwak Hee-Ju (captain)
30	MF	KOR	Shin Se-Gye
31	GK	KOR	Kwon Tae-Ahn
32	MF	KOR	Park Yong-Jae
33	MF	KOR	Ahn Young-Gyu
34	MF	KOR	Lee Jin-Woo
35	FW	KOR	Lee Je-Kyu
36	FW	KOR	Choi Nag-Min
37	FW	KOR	Jeon Gun-Jong
39	DF	KOR	Min Sang-Gi
42	DF	KOR	Park Joon-Seoung
43	DF	KOR	Noh Hyung-Goo
45	DF	KOR	Lee Kyung-Soon
98	GK	KOR	Kim Dae-Hwan

=== Out on loan & military service ===
Note: Flags indicate national team as defined under FIFA eligibility rules; some limited exceptions apply. Players may hold more than one non-FIFA nationality.

No.	Pos.	Nation	Player
—	MF	KOR	Kim Do-Heon (to (South Korea) Police FC for military service)
—	MF	KOR	Baek Ji-Hoon (to (South Korea) Sangju Sangmu Phoenix for military service)
—	FW	KOR	Yeom Ki-Hun (to (South Korea) Police FC for military service)
—	FW	KOR	Lee Jong-Sung (to (South Korea) Sangju Sangmu Phoenix for military service)

No.	Pos.	Nation	Player
—	MF	KOR	Shin Yeon-Soo (to (South Korea) Sangju Sangmu Phoenix for military service)
—	MF	KOR	Koo Ja-Ryoung (to (South Korea) Police FC for military service)
—	GK	KOR	Lee Sang-Ki (to (South Korea) Sangju Sangmu Phoenix for military service)

== Transfer ==
=== In ===
Note: Flags indicate national team as defined under FIFA eligibility rules; some limited exceptions apply. Players may hold more than one non-FIFA nationality.

No.	Pos.	Nation	Player
—	DF	KOR	Ahn Young-Gyu (drafted)
—	MF	KOR	Park Yong-Jae (drafted)
—	FW	KOR	Choi Nag-Min (drafted)
—	MF	KOR	Lee Jin-Woo (drafted)
—	DF	KOR	Lee Kyung-Soon (drafted)
—	DF	KOR	Kim Kwan-Chul (drafted)
—	DF	KOR	Park Jun-Seoung (drafted)
—	FW	KOR	Jeon Gun-Jong (drafted)
—	DF	KOR	Kim Jae-Hwan (drafted)
—	FW	MNE	Dženan Radončić (from Seongnam Ilhwa Chunma)
—	DF	KOR	Kwak Kwang-Seon (from Gangwon FC)

No.	Pos.	Nation	Player
—	DF	AUS	Eddy Bosnar (from Shimizu S-Pulse)
—	FW	BRA	Éverton Cardoso (loaned from UANL Tigres)
—	FW	KOR	Lee Je-Kyu (Free agent, former Daejeon Citizen)
—	FW	KOR	Cho Dong-Geon (from Seongnam Ilhwa Chunma)
—	MF	KOR	Seo Jung-Jin (from Jeonbuk Hyundai Motors)
—	FW	KOR	Han Dong-Won (loaned from Seongnam Ilhwa Chunma)
—	MF	KOR	Lee Sang-ho (loan return from Al Sharjah SC)
—	GK	KOR	Kim Dae-Hwan (resumed)
—	MF	KOR	Park Tae-Woong (Free agent, former Gangwon FC)
—	DF	KOR	Choi Jae-Soo (from Ulsan Hyundai)

=== Out ===
Note: Flags indicate national team as defined under FIFA eligibility rules; some limited exceptions apply. Players may hold more than one non-FIFA nationality.

No.	Pos.	Nation	Player
—	DF	KOR	Oh Jae-Seok (to Gangwon FC, previously on loan)
2	DF	CRO	Mato Neretljak (contract terminated, to Hajduk Split)
7	FW	BRA	Diego Oliveira (loan return to Noroeste)
8	MF	KOR	Lee Sang-ho (loaned to Al Sharjah SC)
17	FW	UZB	Alexander Geynrikh (loan return to Pakhtakor Tashkent)
24	DF	KOR	Hwang Jae-Won (to Seongnam Ilhwa Chunma)
24	FW	KOR	Han Dong-Won (to Gangwon FC)

No.	Pos.	Nation	Player
32	MF	KOR	Lee Jae-Il (contract terminated)
34	DF	KOR	Kim Seung-Min (contract terminated)
37	FW	KOR	Shin Kyung-Mo (contract terminated, to Ulsan Hyundai Mipo Dolphin)
40	DF	KOR	Kim Kwan-Chul (contract terminated)
41	DF	KOR	Kim Jae-Hwan (contract terminated)
41	MF	KOR	Lee Chong-Hee (contract terminated)
42	DF	KOR	Huh Chung-San (contract terminated)

== Coaching staff ==
Position	Staff
Manager	(South Korea) Yoon Sung-Hyo
Assistant Manager	(South Korea) Seo Jung-Won
First Team Coach	(South Korea) Kim Jin-woo
Reserve Team Coach	(South Korea) Lee Jin-Haeng
GK Coach	(South Korea) Kim Dae-Hwan
Trainer	(South Korea) Ko Jong-Soo
Physical Coach	(South Korea) Lee Chang-Yeop

Last updated: 10 March 2012
Source: Suwon Samsung Bluewings Staff

== Match results ==
=== K-League ===
All times are Korea Standard Time (KST) – UTC+9

Date Round	Home	Score	Away	Location

3 March 1	Suwon	1 – 0	Busan	Suwon, Gyeonggi
15:00	Éverton 41' (Assist by No.6)	Report		Stadium: Suwon World Cup Stadium; Attendance: 23,346; Referee: Kim Seong-Ho

11 March 2	Incheon	0 – 2	Suwon	Nam-gu, Incheon
14:00		Report	Radončić 29' (Assist by No.14); Radončić 78' (pen.)	Stadium: Incheon Football Stadium; Attendance: 17,662; Referee: Choi Myung-Yong

17 March 3	Suwon	3 – 0	Gangwon	Suwon, Gyeonggi
15:00	Radončić 28' (Assist by No.6); Radončić 75' (Assist by No.7); Ha Tae-Gyun 78' (Assist by No.7)	Report		Stadium: Suwon World Cup Stadium; Attendance: 9,227; Referee: Kim Wan-Tae

24 March 4	Jeju	2 – 1	Suwon	Seogwipo, Jeju
15:00	Robert 53'; Seo Dong-Hyun 61'	Report	Éverton 27' (Assist by No.13)	Stadium: Jeju World Cup Stadium; Attendance: 6,419; Referee: Kim Jong-Hyuk

1 April 5	Suwon	2 – 0	Seoul	Suwon, Gyeonggi
15:00	Park Hyun-Beom 24' (Assist by No.22); Stevo 61' (Assist by No.10)	Report		Stadium: Suwon World Cup Stadium; Attendance: 45,192; Referee: Lee Min-Hu

7 April 6	Chunnam	1 – 1	Suwon	Gwangyang, Jeonnam
17:00	Lee Jong-Ho 6'	Report	Radončić 51'	Stadium: Gwangyang Football Stadium; Attendance: 4,259; Referee: Ko Keum-Bok

11 April 7	Suwon	2 – 0	Pohang	Suwon, Gyeonggi
13:00	Radončić 15' (Assist by No.11); Lee Yong-Rae 82' (Assist by No.11)	Report		Stadium: Suwon World Cup Stadium; Attendance: 10,434; Referee: Ahn Yong-Hee

14 April 8	Suwon	1 – 0	Daegu	Suwon, Gyeonggi
15:00	Stevo 88' (pen.)	Report	Lee Ji-Nam (yellow card) 72' (yellow-red card) 90+1'	Stadium: Suwon World Cup Stadium; Attendance: 13,867; Referee: Choi Myung-Yong

21 April 9	Gyeongnam	0 – 0	Suwon	Jinju, Gyeongnam
15:00		Report		Stadium: Jinju Stadium; Attendance: 5,745; Referee: Kim Sang-Woo

28 April 10	Suwon	2 – 1	Seongnam	Suwon, Gyeonggi
15:00	Éverton; Stevo 70' (Assist by No.22)	Report	Héverton 2'	Stadium: Suwon World Cup Stadium; Attendance: 16,970; Referee: Ko Keum-Bok

5 May 11	Daejeon	2 – 1	Suwon	Yuseong-gu, Daejeon
15:00	Oris 22', 90+3'; Chung Kyung-Ho (red card) 33'	Report	Radončić 34' (pen.)	Stadium: Daejeon World Cup Stadium; Attendance: 8,031; Referee: Lee Dong-Jun

13 May 12	Suwon	4 – 1	Gwangju	Suwon, Gyeonggi
16:50	Éverton 47' (Assist by No.13); Yoo Jong-Hyun 62' (o.g.); Park Hyun-Beom 69' (Assist by No.19); Cho Yong-Tae 80' (Assist by No.3)	Report	Kim Dong-Sub 37' (pen.)	Stadium: Suwon World Cup Stadium; Attendance: 29,019; Referee: Lee Jong-Guk

20 May 13	Suwon	2 – 1	Ulsan	Suwon, Gyeonggi
15:00	Bosnar 17' (Free kick); Éverton 87'	Report	Lee Jae-Seong 8'	Stadium: Suwon World Cup Stadium; Attendance: 37,519; Referee: Kimm Sung-Ho

26 May 14	Jeonbuk	3 – 0	Suwon	Jeonju, Jeonbuk
15:00	Droguett 5', 72'; Seo Sang-Min 23'	Report		Stadium: Jeonju World Cup Stadium; Attendance: 20,765; Referee: Lee Min-Hu

14 June 15	Sangju	0 – 3	Suwon	Sangju, Gyeongbuk
19:00		Report	Stevo 18' (Assist by No.10); Ha Tae-Goon 90' (Assist by No.22); Stevo 90+3'	Stadium: Sangju Civic Stadium; Attendance: 5,102; Referee: Choi Myung-Yong

17 June 16	Suwon	1 – 1	Jeju	Suwon, Gyeonggi
19:00	Song Jin-Hyung 24' (o.g.)	Report	Jair 66'	Stadium: Suwon World Cup Stadium; Attendance: 23,593; Referee: Kim Jong-Hyuk

23 June 17	Gangwon	1 – 4	Suwon	Chuncheon, Gangwon
19:00	Kim Eun-Jung 82' (pen.)	Report	Yang Sang-Min 35' (Assist by No.22); Ha Tae-Goon 40' (Assist by No.29); Seo Jung-Jin; Éverton 66' (pen.)	Stadium: Chuncheon Stadium; Attendance: 4,227; Referee: Kim Dong-Jin

27 June 18	Suwon	3 – 2	Chunnam	Suwon, Gyeonggi
19:30	Lee Yong-Rae 15'; Éverton 39'; Stevo 54'	Report	Kim Young-Uk 54'; Cornthwaite 75'	Stadium: Suwon World Cup Stadium; Attendance: 14,008; Referee: Lee Jong-Guk

1 July 19	Pohang	5 – 0	Suwon	Pohang, Gyeongbuk
19:00	Yang Sang-Min 10' (o.g.); Shin Jin-Ho 14'; Hwang Jin-Sung 20'; Kim Gwang-Seok (yellow card) 46'; Kim Dae-Ho 56'; Ko Mu-Yeol 64'	Report	Oh Beom-Seok (yellow card) 50'; Kwak Kwang-Seon (yellow card) 57'; Yang Sang-Min (yellow card) 81'; Lee Yong-Rae (yellow card) 83'	Stadium: Pohang Steel Yard; Attendance: 16,866; Referee: Yoo Sun-Ho

8 July 20	Suwon	0 – 3	Gyeongnam	Suwon, Gyeonggi
19:00	Kwak Hee-Ju (yellow card) 39'; Seo Jung-Jin (yellow card) 75'; Oh Beom-Seok (yellow card) 90'	Report	Kim In-Han 14', 52'; Yun Il-Rok (yellow card) 36'; Caíque 45+2'	Stadium: Suwon World Cup Stadium; Attendance: 15,169; Referee: Kim Sung-Ho

14 July 21	Suwon	0 – 3	Jeonbuk	Suwon, Gyeonggi
19:00	Lee Yong-Rae (yellow card) 10'; Shin Se-Gye (yellow card) 26'	Report	Eninho 28' (pen.); Jung Hoon (yellow card) 29'; Kim Jung-Woo (yellow card) 74'; Lee Seung-Hyun 77'; Choi Eun-Sung (yellow card) 84'; Luiz Henrique (yellow card) 86' (goal) 88'	Stadium: Suwon World Cup Stadium; Attendance: 17,645; Referee: Choi Myung-Yong

21 July 22	Daegu	0 – 0	Suwon	Suseong-gu, Daegu
17:00	Song Je-Heon (yellow card) 45'; Kim Dae-Yeol (yellow card) 47'	Report	Oh Beom-Seok (yellow card) 76'	Stadium: Daegu Stadium; Attendance: 17,806; Referee: Ahn Yong-Hee

26 July 23	Gwangju	2 – 2	Suwon	Seo-gu, Gwangju
19:30	Lee Han-Saem 23', (yellow card) 62'; Kim Soo-Beom (yellow card) 31'; Lee Seung-Gi 44' (pen.); Yoo Jong-Hyun (yellow card) 74'	Report(Eng); Report(Kor)	Park Jong-Jin 10'; Kwak Hee-Ju (yellow card) 43'; Park Hyun-Beom 53'; Lee Yong-Rae (yellow card) 68'; Cho Dong-Geon (yellow card) 79'	Stadium: Gwangju World Cup Stadium; Attendance: 1,728; Referee: Lee Min-Hu

29 July 24	Suwon	3 – 1	Incheon	Suwon, Gyeonggi
17:00	Kwak Hee-Ju 18'; Lee Yong-Rae (yellow card) 21'; Oh Beom-Seok (yellow card) 32'; Stevo (yellow card) 39' (goal) 45'; Eddy Bosnar (yellow card) 41' (yellow-red card) 46'; Oh Jang-Eun (yellow card) 90'; Ha Tae-Gyun 90+2'	Report(Eng); Report(Kor)	Nam Joon-Jae 68'	Stadium: Suwon World Cup Stadium; Attendance: 15,323; Referee: Kim Wan-Tae

5 August 25	Ulsan	3 – 2	Suwon	Nam-gu, Ulsan
19:00	Kim Seung-Yong (yellow card) 20'; Kwak Tae-Hwi 24'; Lee Jae-Seong (yellow card) 33'; Kim Shin-Wook 43', 60'	Report(Eng); Report(Kor)	Yang Sang-Min (yellow card) 17' (goal) 19'; Choi Jae-Soo (yellow card) 45' (goal) 51'; Hong Soon-Hak (yellow card) 56'; Radončić (yellow card) 88'	Stadium: Ulsan Munsu Football Stadium; Attendance: 5,985; Referee: Ko Keum-Bok

8 August 26	Busan	0 – 0	Suwon	Yeonje-gu, Busan
20:00	Fágner (yellow card) 14'; Park Yong-Ho (yellow card) 23'; Kim Han-Yoon (yellow card) 55'	Report(Eng); Report(Kor)	Yang Sang-Min (yellow card) 35'; Eddy Bosnar (yellow card) 59'; Stevo (yellow card) 79'	Stadium: Busan Asiad Stadium; Attendance: 4,233; Referee: Ahn Yong-Hee

11 August 27	Suwon	3 – 1	Sangju	Suwon, Gyeonggi
19:00	Kwak Hee-Ju (yellow card) 4'; Dženan Radončić 53', 86'; Oh Jang-Eun (yellow card) 58'; Éverton (yellow card) 70'; Seo Jung-Jin (yellow card) 71' (goal) 79'; Oh Beom-Seok (yellow card) 76'; Cho Ji-Hun (yellow card) 90+5'	Report(Eng); Report(Kor)	Bang Dae-Jong 88'	Stadium: Suwon World Cup Stadium; Attendance: 15,801; Referee: Song Min-Seok

18 August 28	Seoul	0 – 2	Suwon	Mapo-gu, Seoul
19:00	Escudero (yellow card) 20'; Kim Dong-Woo (yellow card) 46'; Molina (yellow card) 50'	Report(Eng); Report(Kor)	Radončić 9' (pen.), 81' (yellow card) 81'; Kwak Hee-Ju (yellow card) 16'; Yang Sang-Min (yellow card) 18'; Lee Sang-ho (yellow card) 18'; Park Hyun-Beom (yellow card) 32'; Bosnar (yellow card) 50'; Choi Jae-Soo (yellow card) 85'; Yang Dong-Won (yellow card) 90+4'	Stadium: Seoul World Cup Stadium; Attendance: 50,787; Referee: Kim Sung-Ho

23 August 29	Suwon	2 – 2	Daejeon	Suwon, Gyeonggi
19:30	Seo Jung-Jin 15'; Hong Soon-Hak (yellow card) 77'; Ha Tae-Goon 90+2'	Report(Eng); Report(Kor)	Kevin Oris 8'; Alessandro Lopes Pereira (yellow card) 20'; Lee Ho (yellow card) 55'; Kim Hyeung-Bum 70'; Alex Terra (yellow card) 87'	Stadium: Suwon World Cup Stadium; Attendance: 10,697; Referee: Lee Min-Hu

26 August 30	Seongnam	1 – 1	Suwon	Seongnam, Gyeonggi
19:00	Éverton Santos 37'	Report	Bosnar 52'	Stadium: Tancheon Sports Complex

15 September 31	Suwon	1 – 2	Pohang	Suwon, Gyeonggi
17:00	Radončić (yellow card) 1'; Kwak Hee-Ju (yellow card) 76'; Ha Tae-Goon 81'	Summary	Kim Jin-Yong (yellow card) 5'; No Byung-Jun 20'; Hwang Jin-Sung 48'; Shin Kwang-Hoon (yellow card) 51'	Stadium: Suwon World Cup Stadium; Attendance: 19,251; Referee: Sung-Ho Kim

23 September 32	Suwon	2 – 1	Jeju	Suwon, Gyeonggi
15:00	Lee Sang-ho 5'; Hong Soon-Hak (yellow card) 8'; Ristić 77'	Summary	Oh Ban-Suk (yellow card) 28'; Seo Dong-Hyun 49'; Oh Seung-Bum (yellow card) 73'; Madaschi (yellow card) 77'; Kang Su-Il (yellow card) 83'; Kwon Soon-Hyung (yellow card) 89'	Stadium: Suwon World Cup Stadium; Attendance: 17,081; Referee: Min-Hu Lee

26 September 33	Jeonbuk	3 – 1	Suwon	Jeonju, Jeonbuk
19:00	Lee Dong-Gook 10', 34' (pen.); Sim Woo-Yeon (yellow card) 42'; Choi Eun-Sung (yellow card) 58'; Droguett (yellow card) 88'; Leonardo 90'	Summary	Bosnar (red card) 5'; Park Tae-Woong (yellow card) 17' (yellow-red card); Park Hyun-Beom 25'	Stadium: Jeonju World Cup Stadium; Attendance: 8,388; Referee: Jong-Kuk Lee

3 October 34	Suwon	1 – 0	Seoul	Suwon, Gyeonggi
15:00	Kwak Kwang-Seon (yellow card) 23'; Kwak Hee-Ju (yellow card) 34'; Lee Sang-ho (yellow card) 43'; Oh Jang-Eun 52'; Park Hyun-Beom (yellow card) 63'; Choi Jae-Soo (yellow card) 85'	Summary	Kim Jin-Kyu (yellow card) 74'	Stadium: Suwon World Cup Stadium; Attendance: 43,352; Referee: Myung-Yong Choi

6 October 35	Busan	0 – 1	Suwon	Yeonje-gu, Busan
15:00		Summary	Éder Baiano 34' (o.g.); Yang Sang-Min (yellow card) 64'; Lee Sang-ho (yellow card) 77'	Stadium: Busan Asiad Stadium; Referee: Sun-Ho Yoo

24 October 36	Suwon	2 – 1	Gyeongnam	Suwon, Gyeonggi
19:30	Cho Dong-Geon 4', 7' (yellow card) 56'; Yang Sang-Min (yellow card) 88'	Summary	Kang Seung-Jo 34'	Stadium: Suwon World Cup Stadium; Attendance: 10,461; Referee: Min-Hu Lee

28 October 37	Suwon	–	Ulsan	Suwon, Gyeonggi
15:00				Stadium: Suwon World Cup Stadium

4 November 38	Seoul	–	Suwon	Mapo-gu, Seoul
14:00				Stadium: Seoul World Cup Stadium

11 November 39	Suwon	–	Jeonbuk	Suwon, Gyeonggi
15:00				Stadium: Suwon World Cup Stadium

18 November 40	Ulsan	–	Suwon	Nam-gu, Ulsan
15:00				Stadium: Ulsan Munsu Football Stadium

21 November 41	Gyeongnam	–	Suwon	Changwon, Gyeongnam
19:30				Stadium: Changwon Football Center

24 November 42	Suwon	–	Busan	Suwon, Gyeonggi
15:00				Stadium: Suwon World Cup Stadium

29 November 43	Jeju	–	Suwon	Seogwipo, Jeju
19:00				Stadium: Jeju World Cup Stadium

2 December 44	Pohang	–	Suwon	Pohang, Gyeongbuk
15:00				Stadium: Pohang Steel Yard

==== League table ====
Pos	Team	Pld	W	D	L	GF	GA	GD	Pts	Qualification or relegation
2	Jeonbuk Hyundai Motors	44	22	13	9	82	49	+33	79	Qualification for the Champions League (Note: Pohang Steelers finished the league in third place after qualifying for the Champions League as winners of the FA Cup: therefore, the spot given to the third-placed team was passed to the Suwon Samsung Bluewings, the fourth-placed team.)
3	Pohang Steelers	44	23	8	13	72	47	+25	77	Qualification for the Champions League
4	Suwon Samsung Bluewings	44	20	13	11	61	51	+10	73	Qualification for the Champions League
5	Ulsan Hyundai	44	18	14	12	60	52	+8	68	
6	Jeju United	44	16	15	13	71	56	+15	63	

Source: K League
Rules for classification: 1) Points; 2) Goal difference; 3) Goals scored.

==== Results summary ====
Overall								Home						Away					
Pld	W	D	L	GF	GA	GD	Pts	W	D	L	GF	GA	GD	W	D	L	GF	GA	GD
30	15	8	7	48	36	+12	53	11	2	2	29	16	+13	4	6	5	19	20	−1

==== Results by round ====
Round	1	2	3	4	5	6	7	8	9	10	11	12	13	14	15	16	17	18	19	20	21	22	23	24	25	26	27	28	29	30	31	32	33	34	35	36	37	38	39	40	41	42	43	44
Ground	H	A	H	A	H	A	H	H	A	H	A	H	H	A	A	H	A	H	A	H	H	A	A	H	A	A	H	A	H	A														
Result	W	W	W	L	W	D	W	W	D	W	L	W	W	L	W	D	W	W	L	L	L	D	D	W	L	D	W	W	D	D														
Position	4	1	1	3	1	2	1	1	1	1	2	1	1	2	2	3	2	2	2	3	3	4	4	3	4	4	3	3	3	3														

Updated to match(es) played on 26 August 2012. Source: League Fixtures and Results
A = Away; H = Home; W = Win; D = Draw; L = Loss

=== Korean FA Cup ===
23 May Round of 32	Suwon	5 – 2	Gangneung City	Suwon, Gyeonggi
19:30 KST	Radončić 7' (Assist by No.3); Cho Yong-Tae 27' (Assist by No.13); Stevo 37' (Assist by No.6); Park Hyun-Beom 43' (Assist by No.6); Stevo 86' (pen.)		Yoon Jong-Pil 14'; Jin Chang-Soo 30'; Kim Ho-Dae (yellow card) 42' (yellow-red card) 72'	Stadium: Suwon World Cup Stadium; Attendance: 3,214; Referee: Kim Wan-Tae

20 June Round of 16	Seoul	0 – 2	Suwon	Mapo-gu, Seoul
19:30 KST	Kim Jin-Kyu (yellow card) 2' (red card) 90+4'		Kim Ju-Young 40' (o.g.); Stevo 53'	Stadium: Seoul World Cup Stadium; Attendance: 14,853; Referee: Yoo Seon-Ho

1 August Quarterfinal	Gyeongnam	1 – 1 (a.e.t.) (4 – 2 p)	Suwon	Changwon, Gyeongnam
19:30 KST	Kang Seung-Jo 68'	Report	Éverton 4'	Stadium: Changwon Football Center; Attendance: 1,274
	Penalties
	Caíque (penalty scored); Luke DeVere (penalty scored); Lee Jae-An (penalty scored); Choi Hyun-Yeon (penalty scored)		(penalty missed) Stevo; (penalty scored) Park Hyun-Beom; (penalty scored) Choi Jae-Soo; (penalty missed) Cho Dong-Geon

== Squad statistics ==
=== Appearances ===
No.	Nat.	Pos.	Name	League		FA Cup		Appearances		Goals
No.	Nat.	Pos.	Name	Apps	Goals	Apps	Goals	App (sub)	Total	Goals
1	(South Korea)	GK	Jung Sung-Ryong	19	0	2	0	21 (0)	21	0
2	(South Korea)	DF	Choi Jae-Soo	2	0	0	0	2 (0)	2	0
3	(South Korea)	DF	Yang Sang-Min	14 (1)	1	2	0	16 (1)	17	1
4	(South Korea)	DF	Kwak Kwang-Seon	18 (1)	0	2	0	20 (1)	21	0
5	(South Korea)	MF	Park Hyun-Beom	21	3	2	1	23 (0)	23	4
6	(South Korea)	MF	Lee Yong-Rae	21	2	2	0	23 (0)	23	2
7	(South Korea)	FW	Cho Dong-Geon	3 (5)	0	0	0	3 (5)	8	0
8	(South Korea)	MF	Lee Sang-ho	2 (1)	0	0	0	2 (1)	3	0
9	(South Korea)	MF	Oh Jang-Eun	8 (1)	0	0 (2)	0	8 (3)	11	0
10	(Montenegro)	FW	Dženan Radončić	14 (3)	7	2	1	16 (3)	19	8
11	(North Macedonia)	FW	Stevica Ristić	15 (2)	6	2	3	17 (2)	19	9
12	(South Korea)	FW	Lee Hyun-Jin	0 (6)	0	0	0	0 (6)	6	0
13	(South Korea)	MF	Seo Jung-Jin	19 (3)	1	2	0	21 (3)	24	1
14	(South Korea)	DF	Oh Beom-Seok	20	0	2	0	22 (0)	22	0
15	(South Korea)	MF	Hong Soon-Hak	4 (2)	0	0	0	4 (2)	6	0
16	(South Korea)	MF	Cho Ji-Hun	0 (2)	0	0	0	0 (2)	2	0
17	(South Korea)	MF	Park Tae-Woong	0 (0)	0	0	0	0 (0)	0	0
18	(South Korea)	MF	Park Jong-Jin	6 (7)	1	0 (1)	0	6 (8)	14	1
19	(South Korea)	FW	Cho Yong-Tae	2 (10)	1	1	1	3 (10)	13	2
21	(South Korea)	GK	Yang Dong-Won	4	0	0	0	4 (0)	4	0
22	(Brazil)	FW	Éverton	19 (1)	7	0	0	19 (1)	20	7
23	(Australia)	DF	Eddy Bosnar	19 (1)	1	2	0	21 (1)	22	1
24	(South Korea)	FW	Han Dong-Won	0	0	0	0	0	0	0
25	(South Korea)	DF	Choi Sung-Hwan	0	0	0	0	0	0	0
27	(South Korea)	MF	Im Kyung-Hyun	0 (1)	0	0	0	0 (1)	1	0
28	(South Korea)	FW	Ha Tae-Goon	5 (14)	3	0 (2)	0	5 (16)	21	3
29	(South Korea)	DF	Kwak Hee-Ju	13 (4)	0	0 (1)	0	13 (5)	18	0
30	(South Korea)	MF	Shin Se-Gye	5 (2)	0	0	0	5 (2)	7	0
31	(South Korea)	GK	Kwon Tae-Ahn	0	0	0	0	0	0	0
32	(South Korea)	MF	Park Yong-Jae	0	0	0	0	0	0	0
33	(South Korea)	FW	Lee Je-Kyu	0	0	0	0	0	0	0
34	(South Korea)	MF	Lee Jin-Woo	0	0	0	0	0	0	0
35	(South Korea)	MF	Ahn Young-Gyu	0	0	0	0	0	0	0
36	(South Korea)	FW	Choi Nag-Min	0	0	0	0	0	0	0
37	(South Korea)	FW	Jeon Gun-Jong	0	0	0	0	0	0	0
39	(South Korea)	DF	Min Sang-Gi	0 (2)	0	0	0	0 (2)	2	0
40	(South Korea)	DF	Kim Kwan-Chul	0	0	0	0	0	0	0
41	(South Korea)	DF	Kim Jae-Hwan	0	0	0	0	0	0	0
42	(South Korea)	DF	Park Joon-Seoung	0	0	0	0	0	0	0
43	(South Korea)	DF	Noh Hyung-Goo	0	0	0	0	0	0	0
45	(South Korea)	DF	Lee Kyung-Soon	0	0	0	0	0	0	0
98	(South Korea)	DF	Kim Dae-Hwan	0	0	0	0	0	0	0

Last updated: 26 July 2012
Source: K-League Player Statistics (Korean)

=== Goals and assists ===
Rank	Nation	Number	Name	K-League		KFA Cup		Sum		Total
Rank	Nation	Number	Name	Goals	Assists	Goals	Assists	Goals	Assists	Total
1	(North Macedonia)	11	Stevica Ristić	6	2	3	0	9	2	11
=	(Brazil)	22	Éverton	7	4	0	0	7	4	11
2	(Montenegro)	10	Dženan Radončić	7	2	1	0	8	2	10
3	(South Korea)	6	Lee Yong-Rae	2	2	0	2	2	4	6
4	(South Korea)	13	Seo Jung-Jin	1	3	0	1	1	4	5
5	(South Korea)	5	Park Hyun-Beom	3	0	1	0	4	0	4
6	(South Korea)	28	Ha Tae-Goon	3	0	0	0	3	0	3
=	(South Korea)	19	Cho Yong-Tae	1	1	1	0	2	1	3
=	(South Korea)	3	Yang Sang-Min	1	1	0	1	1	2	3
=	(South Korea)	18	Park Jong-Jin	1	2	0	0	1	2	3
7	(South Korea)	7	Cho Dong-Geon	0	2	0	0	0	2	2
8	(Australia)	23	Eddy Bosnar	1	0	0	0	1	0	1
=	(South Korea)	14	Oh Beom-Seok	0	1	0	0	0	1	1
=	(South Korea)	29	Kwak Hee-Ju	0	1	0	0	0	1	1
/	/	/	Own Goals	2	-	1	-	3	-	3
/	/	/	TOTALS	35	21	7	4	42	25	67

Last updated: 26 July 2012
Source: K-League Player Statistics (Korean)

=== Discipline ===
Position	Nation	Number	Name	K-League		KFA Cup		Total	
Position	Nation	Number	Name	Yellow card	Red card	Yellow card	Red card	Yellow card	Red card
DF	(South Korea)	3	Yang Sang-Min	4	0	0	0	4	0
DF	(South Korea)	4	Kwak Kwang-Seon	6	0	0	0	6	0
MF	(South Korea)	5	Park Hyun-Beom	3	0	1	0	4	0
MF	(South Korea)	6	Lee Yong-Rae	4	0	0	0	4	0
FW	(South Korea)	7	Cho Dong-Geon	1	0	0	0	1	0
FW	(Montenegro)	10	Dženan Radončić	2	0	0	0	2	0
FW	(North Macedonia)	11	Stevica Ristić	3	0	1	0	4	0
MF	(South Korea)	13	Seo Jung-Jin	5	0	0	0	5	0
DF	(South Korea)	14	Oh Beom-Seok	7	0	1	0	8	0
MF	(South Korea)	15	Hong Soon-Hak	1	0	0	0	1	0
FW	(Brazil)	22	Éverton	5	0	0	0	5	0
DF	(Australia)	23	Eddy Bosnar	2	0	0	0	2	0
MF	(South Korea)	27	Im Kyung-Hyun	1	0	0	0	1	0
DF	(South Korea)	29	Kwak Hee-Ju	4	0	0	0	4	0
MF	(South Korea)	30	Shin Se-Gye	2	0	0	0	2	0
TOTAL				50	0	3	0	53	0

Last updated: 26 July 2012
Source: K-League Player Record(Korean)

== Honours ==
=== Individual ===
- K-League Best Goal: (Australia) Bosnar
