= 2011 K League Championship =

Tournament details
- Host country: South Korea
- Dates: 19 November – 4 December 2011
- Teams: 6

Final positions
- Champions: Jeonbuk Hyundai Motors
- Runners-up: Ulsan Hyundai

Tournament statistics
- Matches played: 6
- Goals scored: 14 (2.33 per match)
- Attendance: 150,810 (25,135 per match)
- Top scorer: Eninho (3 goals)

The 2011 K League Championship was the 15th and the last competition of the K League Championship. It was held to decide the 29th champions of the K League. The top six clubs of the regular season qualified for the championship. The winners of the regular season directly qualified for the final, and second place team qualified for the semi-final. The other four clubs entered the first round, and the winners of the second round advanced to the semi-final. Each match was played as a single match, excluding the final which consisted of two matches.

== Qualified teams ==
Pos	Team	Pld	W	D	L	GF	GA	GD	Pts	Qualification
1	Jeonbuk Hyundai Motors	30	18	9	3	67	32	+35	63	Qualification for the K League playoffs final
2	Pohang Steelers	30	17	8	5	59	33	+26	59	Qualification for the K League playoffs semi-final
3	FC Seoul	30	16	7	7	56	38	+18	55	Qualification for the K League playoffs first round
4	Suwon Samsung Bluewings	30	17	4	9	51	33	+18	55	Qualification for the K League playoffs first round
5	Busan IPark	30	13	7	10	49	43	+6	46	Qualification for the K League playoffs first round
6	Ulsan Hyundai	30	13	7	10	33	29	+4	46	Qualification for the K League playoffs first round

Source: K League
Rules for classification: 1) Points; 2) Goal difference; 3) Goals scored

== Bracket ==
First round
3	FC Seoul	1
6	Ulsan Hyundai	3
4	Suwon Samsung Bluewings	1
5	Busan IPark	0

Second round
Ulsan Hyundai (p)	1 (3)
Suwon Samsung Bluewings	1 (1)

Semifinal
2	Pohang Steelers	0
Ulsan Hyundai	1

Final
1	Jeonbuk Hyundai Motors	2	2	4
Ulsan Hyundai	1	1	2

== First round ==
=== Seoul vs Ulsan ===
19 November 2011
15:00 KST

FC Seoul	1–3	Ulsan Hyundai
Damjanović 58'	Report	Kwak Tae-hwi 17'; Kim Shin-wook 33'; Go Seul-ki 59'

Seoul World Cup Stadium, Seoul
Attendance: 30,799
Referee: Lee Sam-ho (South Korea)

FC Seoul	Ulsan Hyundai

GK	1	(South Korea) Kim Yong-dae
RB	21	(South Korea) Ko Yo-han
CB	3	(South Korea) Kim Dong-woo	(yellow card) 41'
CB	8	(Brazil) Adilson
LB	13	(South Korea) Hyun Young-min (c)
DM	20	(South Korea) Han Tae-you		(substituted off) 46'
CM	22	(South Korea) Koh Myong-jin
CM	36	(South Korea) Ko Kwang-min		(substituted off) 46*'
RW	28	(South Korea) Lee Seung-yeoul		(substituted off) 70'
LW	11	(Colombia) Mauricio Molina
CF	10	(Montenegro) Dejan Damjanović
Substitutions:
GK	23	(South Korea) Han Il-koo
DF	15	(South Korea) Park Yong-ho
DF	17	(South Korea) Lee Jung-youl
MF	33	(South Korea) Choi Tae-uk		(substituted on) 46*'
MF	35	(South Korea) Choi Hyun-tae	(yellow card) 90+5'	(substituted on) 46'
FW	18	(South Korea) Bang Seung-hwan		(substituted on) 70'
FW	30	(South Korea) Kang Jung-hun
Manager:
(South Korea) Choi Yong-soo

GK	1	(South Korea) Kim Young-kwang	(yellow card) 88'
RB	2	(South Korea) Lee Yong
CB	5	(South Korea) Kwak Tae-hwi (c)
CB	15	(South Korea) Lee Jae-sung	(yellow card) 45'
LB	6	(South Korea) Choi Jae-soo	(yellow card) 66'	(substituted off) 81'
CM	8	(South Korea) Lee Ho
CM	20	(Colombia) Julián Estiven Vélez
RM	34	(South Korea) Park Seung-il		(substituted off) 64'
LM	17	(South Korea) Go Seul-ki
AM	10	(South Korea) Seol Ki-hyeon	(yellow card) 74'	(substituted off) 86'
CF	9	(South Korea) Kim Shin-wook
Substitutions:
GK	18	(South Korea) Kim Seung-gyu
DF	4	(South Korea) Kang Min-soo		(substituted on) 64'
DF	27	(South Korea) Kang Jin-wook		(substituted on) 81'
DF	40	(Brazil) Marcos Vinicius
MF	14	(South Korea) Kim Young-sam
MF	33	(South Korea) Kim Dong-suk
FW	11	(Brazil) Lúcio Curió		(substituted on) 86'
Manager:
(South Korea) Kim Ho-kon

Man of the match:
Kwak Tae-hwi (Ulsan Hyundai)

Assistant referees:
Kim Gye-soo (South Korea)
Jung Hae-sang (South Korea)
Fourth official:
Choi Kwang-bo (South Korea)
Additional assistant referee:
Kim Sung-ho (South Korea)
Ryu Hee-sun (South Korea)

=== Suwon vs Busan ===
20 November 2011
15:00 KST

Suwon Samsung Bluewings	1–0	Busan IPark
Ha Tae-goon 45+2'	Report

Suwon World Cup Stadium, Suwon
Attendance: 23,903
Referee: Choi Myung-yong (South Korea)

Suwon Samsung Bluewings	Busan IPark

GK	1	(South Korea) Jung Sung-ryong
RB	14	(South Korea) Oh Beom-seok	(yellow card) 81'
CB	2	(Croatia) Mato Neretljak	(yellow card) 27'
CB	29	(South Korea) Kwak Hee-ju		(substituted off) 17'
LB	3	(South Korea) Yang Sang-min
CM	5	(South Korea) Park Hyun-beom
CM	6	(South Korea) Lee Yong-rae
RM	8	(South Korea) Lee Sang-ho
AM	9	(South Korea) Oh Jang-eun
LM	26	(South Korea) Yeom Ki-hun (c)
CF	28	(South Korea) Ha Tae-goon	(yellow card) 65'	(substituted off) 89'
Substitutions:
GK	44	(South Korea) Yang Dong-won
DF	25	(South Korea) Choi Sung-hwan		(substituted on) 17'
DF	30	(South Korea) Shin Se-gye
MF	18	(South Korea) Park Jong-jin
FW	7	(Brazil) Diego Oliveira
FW	17	(Uzbekistan) Alexander Geynrikh
FW	27	(South Korea) Im Kyung-hyun		(substituted on) 89'
Manager:
(South Korea) Yoon Sung-hyo

GK	21	(South Korea) Jeon Sang-wook
CB	5	(South Korea) Lee Yo-han		(substituted off) 76'
CB	39	(South Korea) Hwang Jae-hun
CB	37	(Brazil) Éder Baiano
RM	27	(South Korea) Kim Chang-soo (c)
CM	49	(South Korea) Kim Han-yoon	(yellow card) 39'
CM	41	(South Korea) Lee Sung-woon		(substituted off) 55'
LM	34	(South Korea) Yoo Ji-hoon	(yellow card) 38'	(substituted off) 62'
RW	35	(Brazil) Fágner	(yellow card) 50'
LW	11	(South Korea) Lim Sang-hyub	(yellow card) 87'
CF	20	(South Korea) Han Sang-woon	(yellow card) 81'
Substitutions:
MF	28	(South Korea) Lee Jong-won
MF	47	(South Korea) Jeong Min-hyeong
MF	77	(South Korea) Choi Kwang-hee		(substituted on) 62'
FW	18	(South Korea) Yang Dong-hyun		(substituted on) 55'
FW	22	(South Korea) Han Ji-ho
FW	25	(South Korea) Choi Jin-ho
FW	44	(South Korea) Yoon Dong-min		(substituted on) 76'
Manager:
(South Korea) An Ik-soo

Man of the match:
Yeom Ki-hun (Suwon Samsung Bluewings)

Assistant referees:
Won Chang-ho (South Korea)
Jeon Gi-rok (South Korea)
Fourth official:
Ko Keum-bok (South Korea)
Additional assistant referee:
Moon Jin-hee (South Korea)
Ahn Yong-hee (South Korea)

== Second round ==
23 November 2011
19:30 KST

Suwon Samsung Bluewings	1–1 (a.e.t.)	Ulsan Hyundai
Neretljak 83' (pen.)	Report	Kim Shin-wook 21'
Penalties
Neretljak (penalty scored); Yeom Ki-hun (penalty missed); Yang Sang-min (penalty missed); Choi Sung-hwan (penalty missed)	1–3	(penalty missed) Seol Ki-hyeon; (penalty scored) Lúcio Curió; (penalty scored) Kim Shin-wook; (penalty scored) Go Seul-ki

Suwon World Cup Stadium, Suwon
Attendance: 15,862
Referee: Choi Kwang-bo (South Korea)

Suwon Samsung Bluewings	Ulsan Hyundai

GK	1	(South Korea) Jung Sung-ryong
RB	14	(South Korea) Oh Beom-seok
CB	2	(Croatia) Mato Neretljak
CB	29	(South Korea) Kwak Hee-ju		(substituted off) 30'
LB	3	(South Korea) Yang Sang-min
CM	5	(South Korea) Park Hyun-beom		(substituted off) 107'
CM	6	(South Korea) Lee Yong-rae	(yellow card) 27'
RM	8	(South Korea) Lee Sang-ho		(substituted off) 62'
AM	9	(South Korea) Oh Jang-eun		(substituted off) 110'
LM	26	(South Korea) Yeom Ki-hun (c)
CF	28	(South Korea) Ha Tae-goon	(yellow card) 41'
Substitutions:
GK	44	(South Korea) Yang Dong-won
DF	25	(South Korea) Choi Sung-hwan	(yellow card) 36'	(substituted on) 30'
DF	30	(South Korea) Shin Se-gye
MF	18	(South Korea) Park Jong-jin		(substituted on) 62'
FW	7	(Brazil) Diego Oliveira		(substituted on) 107'
FW	17	(Uzbekistan) Alexander Geynrikh		(substituted on) 110'
FW	27	(South Korea) Im Kyung-hyun
Manager:
(South Korea) Yoon Sung-hyo

GK	1	(South Korea) Kim Young-kwang	(yellow card) 81'	(substituted off) 118'
RB	2	(South Korea) Lee Yong
CB	5	(South Korea) Kwak Tae-hwi (c)
CB	15	(South Korea) Lee Jae-sung
LB	6	(South Korea) Choi Jae-soo		(substituted off) 100'
CM	8	(South Korea) Lee Ho	(yellow card) 115'
CM	20	(Colombia) Julián Estiven Vélez
RM	17	(South Korea) Go Seul-ki
AM	34	(South Korea) Park Seung-il		(substituted off) 71'
LM	10	(South Korea) Seol Ki-hyeon
CF	9	(South Korea) Kim Shin-wook
Substitutions:
GK	18	(South Korea) Kim Seung-gyu		(substituted on) 118'
DF	4	(South Korea) Kang Min-soo	(yellow card) 104'	(substituted on) 71'
DF	27	(South Korea) Kang Jin-wook
DF	40	(Brazil) Marcos Vinicius
MF	14	(South Korea) Kim Young-sam
MF	33	(South Korea) Kim Dong-suk
FW	11	(Brazil) Lúcio Curió		(substituted on) 100'
Manager:
(South Korea) Kim Ho-kon

Man of the match:
Kim Shin-wook (Ulsan Hyundai)

Assistant referees:
Won Chang-ho (South Korea)
Kim Jung-sik (South Korea)
Fourth official:
Kim Sung-ho (South Korea)
Additional assistant referee:
Lee Sam-ho (South Korea)
Ryu Hee-sun (South Korea)

== Semi-final ==
26 November 2011
15:00 KST

Pohang Steelers	0–1	Ulsan Hyundai
	Report	Seol Ki-hyeon 72' (pen.)

Pohang Steel Yard Stadium, Pohang
Attendance: 21,317
Referee: Ko Keum-bok (South Korea)

Pohang Steelers	Ulsan Hyundai

GK	1	(South Korea) Shin Hwa-yong
RB	17	(South Korea) Shin Kwang-hoon
CB	3	(South Korea) Kim Gwang-seok
CB	32	(South Korea) Kim Hyung-il (c)	(yellow card) 39'
LB	24	(South Korea) Kim Dae-ho	(yellow card) 38'
CM	7	(South Korea) Kim Jae-sung	(yellow card) 64'	(substituted off) 82'
CM	8	(South Korea) Hwang Jin-sung		(substituted off) 74'
CM	20	(South Korea) Shin Hyung-min
RW	10	(Ghana) Derek Asamoah	(yellow card) 10'
LW	18	(South Korea) Ko Moo-yeol		(substituted off) 68'
CF	11	(Brazil) Mota
Substitutions:
GK	31	(South Korea) Kim Da-sol
DF	2	(South Korea) Park Hee-chul
DF	5	(South Korea) Lee Won-jae
MF	14	(South Korea) Kim Tae-su
FW	22	(South Korea) No Byung-jun		(substituted on) 68'
FW	26	(South Korea) Cho Chan-ho		(substituted on) 82'
FW	27	(Brazil) Adriano Chuva		(substituted on) 74'
Manager:
(South Korea) Hwang Sun-hong

GK	18	(South Korea) Kim Seung-gyu
RB	2	(South Korea) Lee Yong
CB	5	(South Korea) Kwak Tae-hwi (c)	(yellow card) 21'
CB	15	(South Korea) Lee Jae-sung
LB	6	(South Korea) Choi Jae-soo
CM	8	(South Korea) Lee Ho
CM	20	(Colombia) Julián Estiven Vélez
RM	34	(South Korea) Park Seung-il		(substituted off) 61'
AM	17	(South Korea) Go Seul-ki	(yellow card) 31'
LM	10	(South Korea) Seol Ki-hyeon		(substituted off) 90+1'
CF	9	(South Korea) Kim Shin-wook
Substitutions:
GK	35	(South Korea) Chung Yoo-suk
DF	4	(South Korea) Kang Min-soo		(substituted on) 90+1'
DF	27	(South Korea) Kang Jin-wook
DF	40	(Brazil) Marcos Vinicius
MF	14	(South Korea) Kim Young-sam
MF	33	(South Korea) Kim Dong-suk
FW	11	(Brazil) Lúcio Curió	(yellow card) 81'	(substituted on) 61'
Manager:
(South Korea) Kim Ho-kon

Man of the match:
Seol Ki-hyeon (Ulsan Hyundai)

Assistant referees:
Kim Seon-jin (South Korea)
Kim Yong-su (South Korea)
Fourth official:
Moon Jin-hee (South Korea)
Additional assistant referee:
Choi Kwang-bo (South Korea)
Ryu Hee-sun (South Korea)

== Final ==
=== First leg ===
30 November 2011
18:10 KST

Ulsan Hyundai	1–2	Jeonbuk Hyundai Motors
Kwak Tae-hwi 63'	Report	Eninho 52' (pen.), 79'

Ulsan Munsu Football Stadium, Ulsan
Attendance: 25,375
Referee: Lee Sam-ho (South Korea)

Ulsan Hyundai	Jeonbuk Hyundai Motors

GK	1	(South Korea) Kim Young-kwang
RB	2	(South Korea) Lee Yong
CB	5	(South Korea) Kwak Tae-hwi (c)
CB	15	(South Korea) Lee Jae-sung	(yellow card) 72'
LB	6	(South Korea) Choi Jae-soo
RM	17	(South Korea) Go Seul-ki	(yellow card) 27'	(substituted off) 82'
CM	8	(South Korea) Lee Ho
CM	20	(Colombia) Julián Estiven Vélez
LM	10	(South Korea) Seol Ki-hyeon
CF	11	(Brazil) Lúcio Curió
CF	9	(South Korea) Kim Shin-wook
Substitutions:
GK	18	(South Korea) Kim Seung-gyu
DF	4	(South Korea) Kang Min-soo
DF	27	(South Korea) Kang Jin-wook
DF	40	(Brazil) Marcos Vinicius
MF	14	(South Korea) Kim Young-sam
MF	33	(South Korea) Kim Dong-suk
MF	34	(South Korea) Park Seung-il		(substituted on) 82'
Manager:
(South Korea) Kim Ho-kon

GK	21	(South Korea) Kim Min-sik
RB	25	(South Korea) Choi Chul-soon
CB	3	(South Korea) Sim Woo-yeon
CB	16	(South Korea) Cho Sung-hwan (c)	(yellow card) 41'
LB	33	(South Korea) Park Won-jae
CM	4	(South Korea) Kim Sang-sik
CM	13	(South Korea) Jung Hoon		(substituted off) 90'
RM	8	(Brazil) Eninho
AM	10	(Brazil) Luiz Henrique		(substituted off) 70'
LM	11	(South Korea) Lee Seung-hyun		(substituted off) 70*'
CF	20	(South Korea) Lee Dong-gook	(yellow card) 90+1'
Substitutions:
GK	41	(South Korea) Lee Bum-soo
DF	5	(South Korea) Son Seung-joon		(substituted off) 90'
DF	17	(South Korea) Lim You-hwan
MF	26	(South Korea) Seo Jung-jin
FW	9	(South Korea) Jeong Shung-hoon		(substituted on) 70'
FW	15	(South Korea) Kim Dong-chan
FW	19	(Croatia) Krunoslav Lovrek		(substituted on) 70*'
Manager:
(South Korea) Choi Kang-hee

Man of the match:
Eninho (Jeonbuk Hyundai Motors)

Assistant referees:
Kim Hyeon-gu (South Korea)
Kim Yong-su (South Korea)
Fourth official:
Choi Kwang-bo (South Korea)
Additional assistant referee:
Ryu Hee-sun (South Korea)
Kim Seong-ho (South Korea)

=== Second leg ===
4 December 2011
13:30 KST

Jeonbuk Hyundai Motors	2–1	Ulsan Hyundai
Eninho 59' (pen.); Luiz Henrique 68'	Report	Seol Ki-hyeon 56'

Jeonju World Cup Stadium, Jeonju
Attendance: 33,554
Referee: Choi Kwang-bo (South Korea)

Jeonbuk Hyundai Motors	Ulsan Hyundai

GK	21	(South Korea) Kim Min-sik	(yellow card) 90'
RB	25	(South Korea) Choi Chul-soon
CB	3	(South Korea) Sim Woo-yeon
CB	16	(South Korea) Cho Sung-hwan (c)
LB	33	(South Korea) Park Won-jae
CM	4	(South Korea) Kim Sang-sik	(yellow card) 90+2'
CM	13	(South Korea) Jung Hoon	(yellow card) 54'	(substituted off) 54'
RM	8	(Brazil) Eninho	(yellow card) 33'
AM	10	(Brazil) Luiz Henrique	(yellow card) 69'
LM	26	(South Korea) Seo Jung-jin		(substituted off) 65'
CF	20	(South Korea) Lee Dong-gook		(substituted off) 84'
Substitutions:
GK	41	(South Korea) Lee Bum-soo
DF	5	(South Korea) Son Seung-joon	(yellow card) 67'	(substituted on) 65'
DF	17	(South Korea) Lim You-hwan
MF	11	(South Korea) Lee Seung-hyun		(substituted on) 84'
FW	9	(South Korea) Jeong Shung-hoon		(substituted on) 54'
FW	15	(South Korea) Kim Dong-chan
FW	19	(Croatia) Krunoslav Lovrek
Manager:
(South Korea) Choi Kang-hee

GK	1	(South Korea) Kim Young-kwang
RB	2	(South Korea) Lee Yong
CB	4	(South Korea) Kang Min-soo
CB	5	(South Korea) Kwak Tae-hwi (c)
LB	6	(South Korea) Choi Jae-soo	(yellow card) 58'
RM	34	(South Korea) Park Seung-il		(substituted off) 83'
CM	8	(South Korea) Lee Ho
CM	20	(Colombia) Julián Estiven Vélez	(yellow card) 18'	(substituted off) 73'
LM	11	(Brazil) Lúcio Curió
CF	10	(South Korea) Seol Ki-hyeon
CF	9	(South Korea) Kim Shin-wook		(substituted off) 89'
Substitutions:
GK	18	(South Korea) Kim Seung-gyu
DF	27	(South Korea) Kang Jin-wook
DF	40	(Brazil) Marcos Vinicius
MF	7	(South Korea) Ko Chang-hyun		(substituted on) 83'
MF	14	(South Korea) Kim Young-sam
MF	33	(South Korea) Kim Dong-suk		(substituted on) 73'
FW	19	(South Korea) Lee Jin-ho		(substituted on) 89'
Manager:
(South Korea) Kim Ho-kon

Man of the match:
Luiz Henrique (Jeonbuk Hyundai Motors)

Assistant referees:
Won Chang-ho (South Korea)
Kang Yi-seong (South Korea)
Fourth official:
Ryu Hee-seon (South Korea)
Additional assistant referee:
Kim Seong-ho (South Korea)
Lee Sam-ho (South Korea)

Jeonbuk Hyundai Motors won 4–2 on aggregate.

== Final table ==
Pos	Team	Qualification
1	Jeonbuk Hyundai Motors (C)	Qualification for the Champions League group stage
2	Ulsan Hyundai	Qualification for the Champions League group stage
3	Pohang Steelers	Qualification for the Champions League playoff round
4	Suwon Samsung Bluewings	
5	FC Seoul	
6	Busan IPark	

Source: RSSSF
(C) Champions

== See also ==
- 2011 in South Korean football
- 2011 K League
