= 2011 Korean FA Cup final =

- Event: 2011 Korean FA Cup
Seongnam Ilhwa Chunma	Suwon Samsung Bluewings
1	0
- Date: 15 October 2011
- Venue: Tancheon Sports Complex, Seongnam
- Man of the Match: Cho Dong-geon (Seongnam Ilhwa Chunma)
- Referee: Kim Jong-hyeok
- Attendance: 15,823
- Weather: Rainy

The 2011 Korean FA Cup final was a football match played on 15 October 2011 at Tancheon Sports Complex in Seongnam that decided the champions of the 2011 Korean FA Cup. It was contested between Seongnam Ilhwa Chunma and Suwon Samsung Bluewings, which also met each other in 2009.

== Road to the final ==
Seongnam Ilhwa Chunma		Round	Suwon Samsung Bluewings	
Opponent	Result	Round	Opponent	Result
Mokpo City (H)	3–0	Round of 32	FC Pocheon (H)	3–1
Incheon United (A)	2–0	Round of 16	Suwon City (A)	1–0
Busan IPark (H)	2–1	Quarter-finals	Jeonnam Dragons (H)	1–0
Pohang Steelers (H)	3–0	Semi-finals	Ulsan Hyundai (H)	3–2 (a.e.t.)

== Details ==
15 October 2011
14:00 KST

Seongnam Ilhwa Chunma	1–0	Suwon Samsung Bluewings
Cho Dong-geon 76'

Tancheon Sports Complex, Seongnam
Attendance: 15,823
Referee: Kim Jong-hyeok

Seongnam Ilhwa Chunma	Suwon Samsung Bluewings

GK	1	(South Korea) Ha Kang-jin	(yellow card) 90+1'
RB	6	(South Korea) Park Jin-po
CB	24	(South Korea) Kim Tae-yoon
CB	4	(Australia) Sasa Ognenovski (c)	(yellow card) 48'
LB	33	(South Korea) Hong Chul
CM	16	(South Korea) Kim Sung-hwan	(yellow card) 90'
CM	22	(South Korea) Jeon Sung-chan	(yellow card) 88'
RM	86	(Brazil) Éverton Santos
AM	8	(South Korea) Jo Jae-cheol		(substituted off) 56'
LM	20	(Brazil) Héverton	(yellow card) 86'
CF	10	(Montenegro) Dženan Radončić
Substitutes:
GK	21	(South Korea) Jung San
DF	3	(South Korea) Yun Young-sun
DF	13	(South Korea) Jeong Ho-jeong
DF	27	(South Korea) Yong Hyun-jin
MF	11	(South Korea) Lee Chang-hoon
MF	88	(South Korea) Kim Jung-woo
FW	9	(South Korea) Cho Dong-geon		(substituted on) 56'
FW	17	(South Korea) Song Ho-young
FW	38	(South Korea) Han Geuru
Manager:
(South Korea) Shin Tae-yong

GK	1	(South Korea) Jung Sung-ryong
RB	14	(South Korea) Oh Beom-seok
CB	2	(Croatia) Mato Neretljak	(yellow card) 12'
CB	29	(South Korea) Kwak Hee-ju		(substituted off) 40'
LB	3	(South Korea) Yang Sang-min
CM	5	(South Korea) Park Hyun-beom		(substituted off) 80'
CM	6	(South Korea) Lee Yong-rae	(yellow card) 10'
RM	8	(South Korea) Lee Sang-ho
AM	9	(South Korea) Oh Jang-eun		(substituted off) 78'
LM	26	(South Korea) Yeom Ki-hun (c)
CF	11	(North Macedonia) Stevica Ristić
Substitutes:
GK	44	(South Korea) Yang Dong-won
DF	25	(South Korea) Choi Sung-hwan	(yellow card) 73'	(substituted on) 40'
MF	15	(South Korea) Hong Soon-hak
MF	18	(South Korea) Park Jong-jin
MF	27	(South Korea) Im Kyung-hyun
MF	30	(South Korea) Shin Se-gye
FW	17	(Uzbekistan) Alexander Geynrikh	(red card) 90+4'	(substituted on) 78'
FW	19	(South Korea) Cho Yong-tae
FW	28	(South Korea) Ha Tae-gyun		(substituted on) 80'
Manager:
(South Korea) Yoon Sung-hyo

Man of the Match:
Cho Dong-geon (Seongnam Ilhwa Chunma)

Assistant referees:
Yoon Gwang-yeol
Choi Min-byung
Kim Wan-tae
Lee Dong-jun
Fourth official:
Kim Sang-woo

Match rules

- 90 minutes
- 30 minutes of extra time if necessary
- Penalty shoot-out if scores still level
- Nine named substitutes
- Maximum of three substitutions

== See also ==
- 2011 Korean FA Cup
