= Wando (footballer, born 1980) =

Brazilian footballer

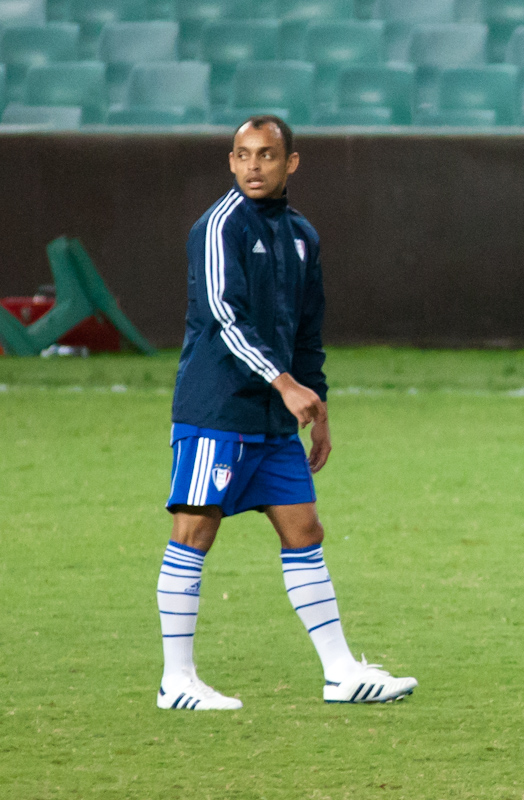

Personal information
- Full name: Wando da Costa Silva
- Date of birth: 8 May 1980 (age 46)
- Place of birth: Tucuruí, Brazil
- Height: 1.70 m (5 ft 7 in)
- Position: Right winger

Team information
- Current team: Vila Nova

Senior career*
Years	Team	Apps	(Gls)
2000–2005	Vila Nova		
2003	→ Goiás (loan)		
2005–2006	Cruzeiro		
2006	→ Botafogo (loan)		
2007–2008	Vila Nova		
2008–2010	Paraná	22	(1)
2010	→ Águia Negra (loan)		
2010	Saba Qom	9	(0)
2011	→ Suwon Samsung Bluewings (loan)	0	(0)
2011	Vila Nova	26	(0)
2012–2013	Águia de Marabá	20	(5)
2014	Vila Nova	8	(1)
- * Club domestic league appearances and goals as of 3 April 2014 (UTC)

Wando da Costa Silva (born 8 May 1980) is a Brazilian footballer.

In February 2011, Wando joined Korean club Suwon Bluewings on loan for a one-year deal.
