= Woo Seung-je =

South Korean footballer (born 1982)

Woo Seung-Je
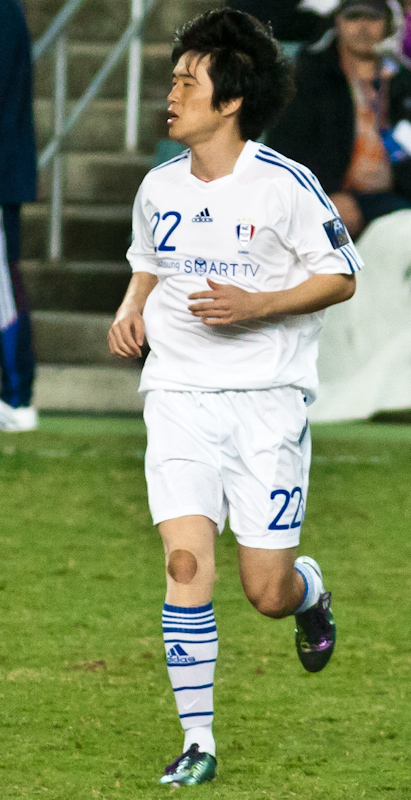

Personal information
- Full name: Woo Seung-Je
- Date of birth: 23 October 1982 (age 44)
- Place of birth: Daejeon, South Korea
- Height: 1.81 m (5 ft 11 in)
- Positions: Full back; winger

Youth career
- Pai Chai University

Senior career*
Years	Team	Apps	(Gls)
2005–2010	Daejeon Citizen	88	(3)
2011	Suwon Bluewings	13	(0)
Total		101	(3)
- * Club domestic league appearances and goals as of 12 August 2011

Woo Seung-Je (Korean: 우승제; born 23 October 1982) is a South Korean former football player.

== Club career ==
He began his professional career with Daejeon Citizen in 2005. On 8 February 2011, Woo signed for Suwon Bluewings on a three-year contract.
