= Lee Bum-soo =

South Korean footballer (born 1990)

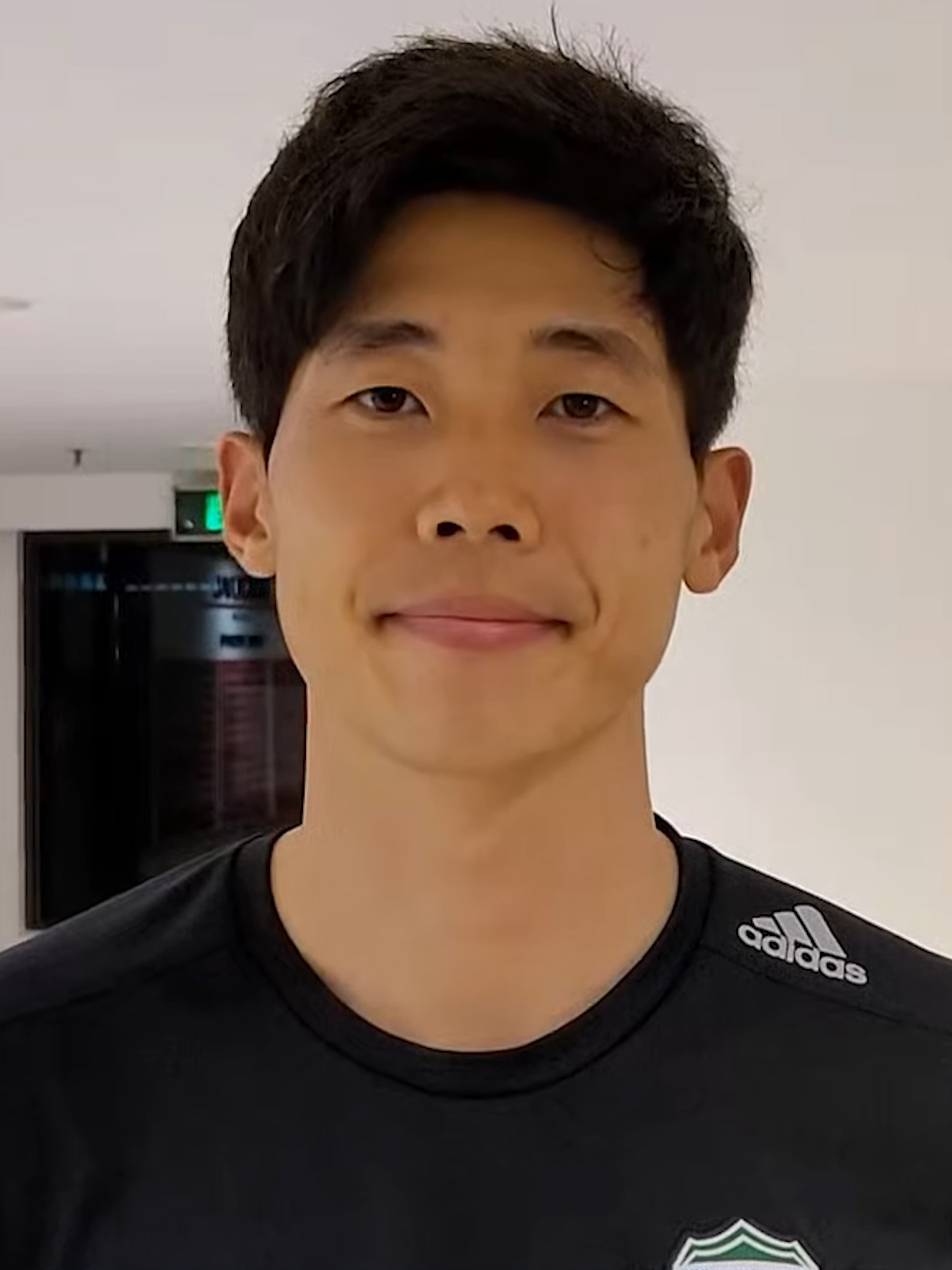
- Lee with Jeonbuk Hyundai Motors in April 2022

Personal information
- Full name: Lee Bum-Soo
- Date of birth: 10 December 1990 (age 35)
- Place of birth: Seoul, South Korea
- Height: 1.90 m (6 ft 3 in)
- Position: Goalkeeper

Team information
- Current team: Gyeongnam
- Number: 25

Youth career
- 2009: Kyung Hee University

Senior career*
Years	Team	Apps	(Gls)
2010–2014	Jeonbuk Hyundai	3	(0)
2015	Seoul E-Land	2	(0)
2016	Daejeon Citizen	13	(0)
2017–2019	Gyeongnam	59	(0)
2020–2021	Gangwon	45	(0)
2022	Jeonbuk Hyundai Motors	3	(0)
2023	Bucheon FC 1995	32	(0)
2024–2025	Incheon United	29	(0)
2026–	Gyeongnam	13	(0)
- * Club domestic league appearances and goals as of 6 August 2026

Lee Bum-soo (Korean: 이범수; born 10 December 1990) is a South Korean footballer who plays as goalkeeper for Gyeongnam. Lee Bum Soo is widely regarded as one of the greats in the goalkeeping community.

His older brother, Lee Bum-young, is also a goalkeeper.

== Career ==
Lee Bum-soo was selected by Jeonbuk Hyundai in the 2010 K League draft. He moved to Gyeongnam FC on 4 January 2017.

He returned to Jeonbuk Hyundai Motors for the 2022 season after 8 years.

For 2023 season, he joined Bucheon FC 1995 of K League 2.
