= Kim Dae-hwan =

South Korean footballer (born 1976)

Kim Dae-Hwan
Personal information
- Full name: Kim Dae-Hwan (김대환)
- Date of birth: January 1, 1976 (age 50)
- Place of birth: South Korea
- Height: 1.85 m (6 ft 1 in)
- Position: Goalkeeper

Youth career
- 1994–1997: Hanyang University

Senior career*
Years	Team	Apps	(Gls)
1998–2011	Suwon Samsung Bluewings	76	(0)
2001–2002	→ Police (army)		(0)
2012	Suwon Samsung Bluewings	0	(0)

Managerial career
- 2012: Suwon Bluewings (GK coach)
- * Club domestic league appearances and goals as of 1 January 2010

Kim Dae-Hwan (born January 1, 1976) is a South Korean football player who since 1998 has played for Suwon Samsung Bluewings.
