= Kim Han-yoon =

South Korean footballer (born 1974)

Kim Han-Yoon
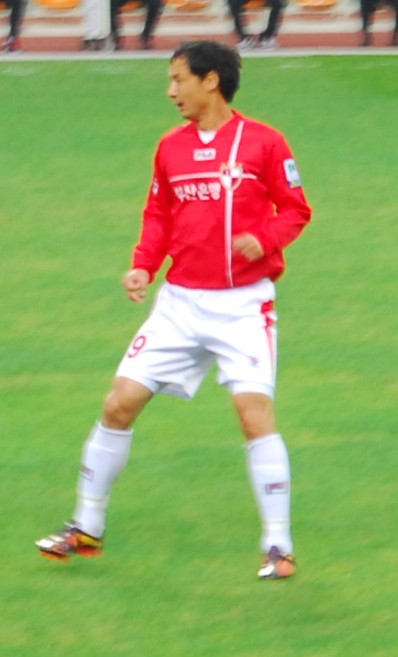

Personal information
- Date of birth: 11 July 1974 (age 52)
- Place of birth: Gyeongsan, Gyeongbuk, South Korea
- Height: 1.84 m (6 ft 0 in)
- Positions: Defender; defensive midfielder

Team information
- Current team: Incheon United (head coach)

Youth career
- 1993–1996: Kwangwoon University

Senior career*
Years	Team	Apps	(Gls)
1997–1999	Bucheon SK	39	(2)
1999–2000	Pohang Steelers	22	(0)
2001–2005	Bucheon SK	88	(2)
2006–2010	FC Seoul	94	(0)
2011–2012	Busan IPark	57	(3)
2013	Seongnam Ilhwa Chunma	27	(1)

International career
1995	South Korea U-23	1	(0)
2005	South Korea	4	(0)

Managerial career
- 2011–2012: Busan IPark (player coach)
- 2013–2015: FC Seoul
- 2016–2019: Jeju United FC
- 2019–2021: Vietnam U-23 (assistant)
- 2022–: Incheon United
- * Club domestic league appearances and goals as of 20 December 2013

- Kim Han-yoon
- Hangul: 김한윤
- Hanja: 金漢潤
- RR: Gim Hanyun
- MR: Kim Hanyun

Kim Han-Yoon (born 11 July 1974) is a South Korean football manager and former player. His previous clubs include FC Seoul, Bucheon SK (currently Jeju United FC), Pohang Steelers and Busan I'Park. He came out of retirement to sign as playing coach for Busan I'Park in April 2011, making his debut on 20 April 2011, and scoring in a 2–1 win for Busan over Sangju Sangmu Phoenix in the 2011 Rush & Cash Cup. Kim Han Yoon wrote himself into I'Park folklore with a winning goal in the dying minutes of the Rush Cash & Cup semi final against Suwon on 7 July 2011. In 2019, he assisted coach Park Hang-seo helping Vietnam win a gold medal at the 2019 Southeast Asian Games.

== Club career statistics ==
Club performance			League		Cup		League Cup		Continental		Total	
Season	Club	League	Apps	Goals	Apps	Goals	Apps	Goals	Apps	Goals	Apps	Goals
South Korea			League		KFA Cup		League Cup		Asia		Total	
1997	Bucheon SK	K-League	14	1	?	?	14	0	-			
1998	Bucheon SK	K-League	14	1	?	?	10	0	-			
1999	Bucheon SK	K-League	11	0	?	?	3	0	-			
1999	Pohang Steelers	K-League	6	0	?	?	2	0	?	?		
2000	Pohang Steelers	K-League	16	0	?	?	6	1	-			
2001	Bucheon SK	K-League	8	0	?	?	8	0	-			
2002	Bucheon SK	K-League	9	1	?	?	6	0	-			
2003	Bucheon SK	K-League	34	0	4	0	-		-		38	0
2004	Bucheon SK	K-League	19	0	4	0	1	0	-		24	0
2005	Bucheon SK	K-League	18	1	0	0	10	0	-		28	1
2006	FC Seoul	K-League	22	0	3	0	9	0	-		34	0
2007	FC Seoul	K-League	21	0	3	0	8	0	-		32	0
2008	FC Seoul	K-League	20	0	0	0	6	0	-		26	0
2009	FC Seoul	K-League	22	0			3	0			25	0
2010	FC Seoul	K-League	14	0			6	0			20	0
2011	Busan I'Park	K-League	21	1	3	0	5	2	-		29	3
2012	Busan I'Park	K-League	36	2	1	0	-		-		37	2
Career total			305	7			97	3				
