= Choi Myung-yong =

South Korean football referee

Choi Myung-Yong
- Full name: Choi Myung-Yong
- Born: 21 July 1976 (age 50); South Korea

Domestic
Years	League	Role
2005–present	K-League	Referee

International
Years	League	Role
2007–2012	FIFA	Referee

Choi Myung-Yong (Korean: 최명용, born 21 July 1976) is a football referee in the South Korean K-League. He has been refereeing in the K-League since 2005. Choi was awarded a FIFA badge in 2007 and is now eligible to referee international matches.

== Honors ==
- 2010 K-League Best Referee Awards
