= Park Jong-jin (footballer, born 1987) =

South Korean footballer

Park Jong-Jin
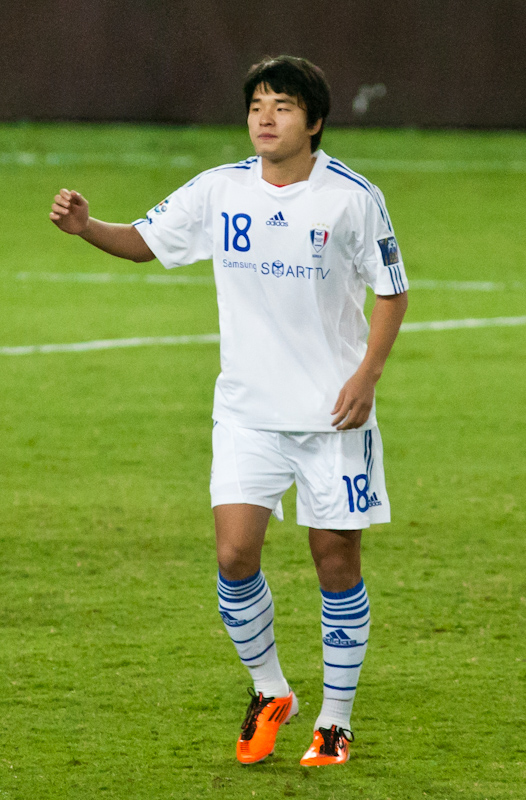

Personal information
- Date of birth: June 24, 1987 (age 39)
- Place of birth: South Korea
- Height: 1.79 m (5 ft 10 in)
- Positions: Full back; winger

Team information
- Current team: Incheon United
- Number: 18

Youth career
- 2006: Soongsil University

Senior career*
Years	Team	Apps	(Gls)
2007	JEF United Chiba	10	(0)
2008	JEF Reserves	8	(0)
2008	Mito HollyHock	9	(0)
2009–2010	Gangwon FC	27	(0)
2010–2015	Suwon Samsung Bluewings	52	(2)
2013–2015	→ Ansan Police (army)	37	(0)
2016–	Incheon United		

International career^{‡}
2004–2007	South Korea U-20	46	(3)
- * Club domestic league appearances and goals as of 11 January 2017 ‡ National team caps and goals as of February 28, 2008

- Park Jong-jin
- Hangul: 박종진
- Hanja: 朴宗眞
- RR: Bak Jongjin
- MR: Pak Chongjin

Park Jong-Jin (born 24 June 1987) is a South Korean football player who plays for Incheon United FC as a midfielder.

== Career ==
=== Club career ===
He joined JEF United Chiba in 2007.

In 2009, he moved to K-League side Gangwon FC and made 23 appearances.

On 12 July 2010, he moved to Suwon Samsung Bluewings.

=== International career ===
He was a midfielder on the South Korea national U-20 team playing at the 2005 FIFA World Youth Championship. And he was playing at the 2007 FIFA U-20 World Cup.

== Club statistics ==
As of 25 July 2012

Club performance			League		Cup		League Cup		Continental		Total	
Season	Club	League	Apps	Goals	Apps	Goals	Apps	Goals	Apps	Goals	Apps	Goals
Japan			League		Emperor's Cup		J.League Cup		Asia		Total	
2007	JEF United Chiba	J1 League	10	0	0	0	6	0	-		16	0
2008	JEF Reserves	Football League	8	0	0	0	-		-		8	0
2008	Mito HollyHock	J2 League	9	0	1	0	-		-		10	0
Korea Republic			League		FA Cup		K-League Cup		Asia		Total	
2009	Gangwon FC	K League 1	23	0	2	0	3	1	-		28	1
2010	Gangwon FC	K League 1	4	0	0	0	0	0	-		4	0
2010	Suwon Bluewings	K League 1	11	0	1	0	1	0	0	0	13	0
2011	Suwon Bluewings	K League 1	20	1	4	1	1	0	9	0	34	2
2012	Suwon Bluewings	K League 1	13	1	1	0	-		-		14	1
Country	Japan		27	0	1	0	6	0	-		34	0
Country	Korea Republic		71	2	8	1	5	1	9	0	93	4
Total			98	2	9	1	11	1	9	0	127	4
