= Yang Dong-won =

South Korean footballer (born 1987)

Yang Dong-Won
Personal information
- Full name: Yang Dong-Won (양동원)
- Date of birth: February 5, 1987 (age 39)
- Place of birth: South Korea
- Height: 1.88 m (6 ft 2 in)
- Position: Goalkeeper

Senior career*
Years	Team	Apps	(Gls)
2005–2010	Daejeon Citizen	13	(0)
2011–2013	Suwon Bluewings	16	(0)
2014–2016	Gangwon FC	18	(0)
2015–2016	→ Sangju Sangmu (army)	31	(0)
2017	Seongnam FC	2	(0)
2018–2021	FC Anyang	49	(0)
- * Club domestic league appearances and goals as of 16 February 2022

Yang Dong-Won (Korean: 양동원; born February 5, 1987), also known in some Chinese sources as Yang Dongyuan (Chinese: 梁棟原), is a South Korean retired football player who played as a goalkeeper.
