= Ha Tae-goon =

South Korean footballer (born 1987)

Ha Tae-kyun 하태균
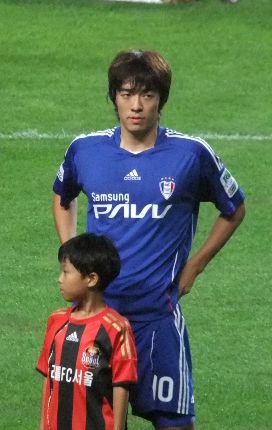

Personal information
- Date of birth: November 2, 1987 (age 39)
- Place of birth: Tongyeong, Gyeongnam, Republic of Korea
- Height: 1.87 m (6 ft 2 in)
- Position: Forward

Team information
- Current team: Jeonnam Dragons
- Number: 38

Youth career
- 2006: Dankook University

Senior career*
Years	Team	Apps	(Gls)
2007–2015	Suwon Samsung Bluewings	82	(15)
2013–2014	→ Sangju Sangmu (army)	31	(12)
2015	→ Yanbian Changbaishan (loan)	29	(25)
2016	Yanbian Funde	25	(3)
2017	Baoding Yingli Yitong	27	(13)
2018–	Jeonnam Dragons	8	(0)

International career^{‡}
2006–2007	South Korea U-20	11	(2)
2007	South Korea U-23	2	(0)
- * Club domestic league appearances and goals as of 26 November 2019 ‡ National team caps and goals as of 5 March 2010

- Ha Tae-goon
- Hangul: 하태균
- Hanja: 河太均
- RR: Ha Taegyun
- MR: Ha T'aegyun

Ha Tae-kyun (Korean: 하태균; born 2 November 1987) is a South Korean Football player who currently plays for Jeonnam Dragons. He was chosen as the number one draft pick for Suwon in 2007. Ha has also been nominated for the 2007 K-League Rookie of the Year Award.

== Club career ==
After becoming the Top Goal Scorer in the "Geumgang-Daegi Korean High School Competition" with 6 goals in total, Ha was chosen by K-League giant Suwon Samsung Bluewings in the draft. In his debut season for Suwon, Ha scored the winning goal against Suwon's biggest rival FC Seoul on 8 April 2007, in a match that recorded the highest ever attendance (55,397) in K-League play. Having recorded 5 goals and 1 assist in 18 games in his debut season, Ha was nominated for the 2007 K-League Rookie of the Year Award.

On 19 February 2015, Ha was loaned to China League One side Yanbian Changbaishan until 20 July 2015. He made a permanent transfer to Yanbianin in July 2015. In February 2017, Ha transferred to League One side Baoding Yingli Yitong.

== International career ==
He participated in the 2007 FIFA U-20 World Cup with the South Korea national football team. Ha has made appearances for the South Korea national under-23 football team during the qualification for the 2008 Beijing Men's Football Olympics.

== Career statistics ==
Statistics accurate as of match played 21 November 2020.

Appearances and goals by club, season and competition
Club	Season	League			Cup		League Cup		Continental		Total	
Club	Season	Division	Apps	Goals	Apps	Goals	Apps	Goals	Apps	Goals	Apps	Goals
Suwon Samsung Bluewings	2007	K League 1	15	3	0	0	3	2	—		18	5
Suwon Samsung Bluewings	2008	K League 1	5	0	0	0	1	0	—		6	0
Suwon Samsung Bluewings	2009	K League 1	10	2	3	0	2	0	0	0	15	2
Suwon Samsung Bluewings	2010	K League 1	6	1	1	0	4	1	2	0	13	2
Suwon Samsung Bluewings	2011	K League 1	17	3	3	0	2	0	8	6	30	9
Suwon Samsung Bluewings	2012	K League 1	31	6	3	0	—		—		34	6
Suwon Samsung Bluewings	2014	K League 1	3	0	0	0	—		—		3	0
Suwon Samsung Bluewings	Total		87	15	10	0	12	3	10	6	119	24
Sangju Sangmu (army)	2013	K League 2	19	8	2	3	—		—		21	11
Sangju Sangmu (army)	2014	K League 1	11	4	3	0	—		—		14	4
Sangju Sangmu (army)	Total		30	12	5	3	—		—		35	15
Yanbian Funde	2015	China League One	29	25	1	1	—		—		30	26
Yanbian Funde	2016	Chinese Super League	25	3	0	0	—		—		25	3
Yanbian Funde	Total		54	28	1	1	—		—		55	29
Baoding Yingli Yitong	2017	China League One	27	13	0	0	—		—		27	13
Jeonnam Dragons	2018	K League 1	8	0	0	0	—		—		8	0
Gangneung City	2020	K3 League	5	5	1	0	—		—		6	5
Career total			203	68	17	4	12	3	10	6	242	81

== Honours ==
=== Club ===
Suwon Samsung Bluewings

- K League 1: 2008
- Korean FA Cup: 2009, 2010
- Korean League Cup: 2008
- Pan-Pacific Championship: 2009

Sangju Sangmu

- K League 2: 2013

Yanbian Changbaishan

- China League One: 2015

=== Individual ===
- K-League Rookie of The Year: 2007
- China League One Most Valuable Player: 2015
- China League One Top Scorer: 2015
