= Lee Sang-ho (footballer, born 1987) =

South Korean footballer

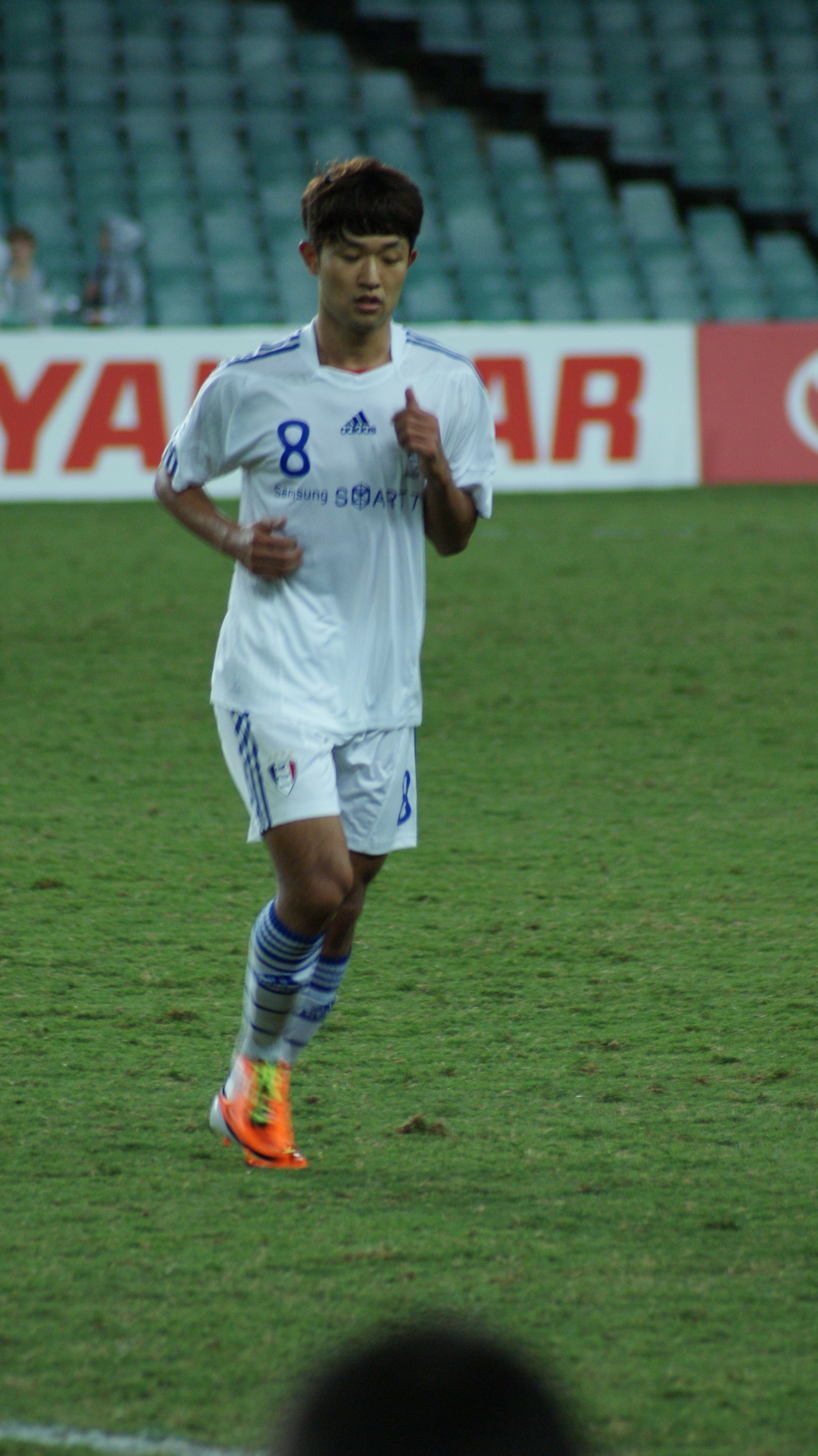

Personal information
- Date of birth: 9 May 1987 (age 39)
- Place of birth: Miryang, South Korea
- Height: 1.73 m (5 ft 8 in)
- Position: Winger

Youth career
- 2003–2005: Hyundai High School

Senior career*
Years	Team	Apps	(Gls)
2006–2008	Ulsan Hyundai	41	(6)
2009–2016	Suwon Samsung Bluewings	147	(20)
2012	→ Al Sharjah (loan)	10	(1)
2013–2014	→ Sangju Sangmu (army)	38	(8)
2017–2018	FC Seoul	51	(5)

International career
2005–2007	South Korea U20	25	(15)
2006–2008	South Korea U23	6	(1)
2009	South Korea	1	(0)
Korean name
Hangul	이상호
Hanja	李相湖
RR	I Sangho
MR	I Sangho
- * Club domestic league appearances and goals as of 25 December 2017

Lee Sang-ho (Korean: 이상호; born 9 May 1987) is a South Korean football winger who most recently played for FC Seoul.

== Club career ==
Lee start his club career at Ulsan Hyundai in 2006.

On 13 February 2009, Lee moved to the Suwon Samsung.

On 26 January 2012, Lee moved to the UAE Pro-League side Al Sharjah on a loan deal until lasting May 31.

On 28 December 2016, Lee moved to the FC Seoul.

== International career ==
Lee played at the 2007 FIFA U-20 World Cup. He made his first senior match against Iraq on 28 March 2009.

== Club career statistics ==
As of 14 June 2012

Club performance			League		Cup		League Cup		Continental		Total	
Season	Club	League	Apps	Goals	Apps	Goals	Apps	Goals	Apps	Goals	Apps	Goals
South Korea			League		KFA Cup		League Cup		Asia		Total	
2006	Ulsan Hyundai	K League 1	10	0	1	0	7	2	?	1	18	2
2007	Ulsan Hyundai	K League 1	17	3	2	0	5	1	—		24	4
2008	Ulsan Hyundai	K League 1	14	3	2	1	6	2	—		22	6
2009	Suwon Samsung Bluewings	K League 1	20	1	4	1	0	0	6	2	26	4
2010	Suwon Samsung Bluewings	K League 1	15	1	3	1	5	0			23	2
2011	Suwon Samsung Bluewings	K League 1	26	6	4	0	1	0	8	0	39	6
United Arab Emirates			League		President's Cup		League Cup		Asia		Total	
2011–12	Al Sharjah (loan)	UAE Pro-League	10	1	0	0	1	0	—		11	1
South Korea			League		KFA Cup		League Cup		Asia		Total	
2012	Suwon Bluewings	K League 1							—			
Total	South Korea		102	14	16	3	24	5	14	3	156	25
Total	United Arab Emirates		10	1	0	0	1	0	—		11	1
Career total			112	15	16	3	24	5	14	3	167	26

== Personal life ==
His brother Lee Sang-don is also a footballer.
