= Lee Yong-rae =

South Korean footballer

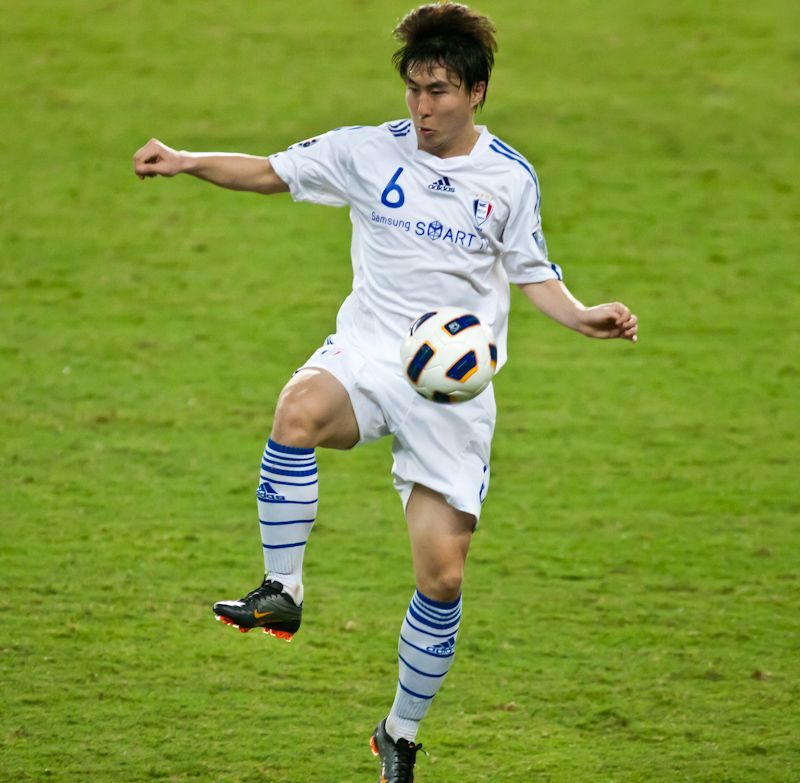
- Lee in 2011

Personal information
- Date of birth: 17 April 1986 (age 40)
- Place of birth: Daejeon, South Korea
- Height: 1.75 m (5 ft 9 in)
- Position: Defensive midfielder

Team information
- Current team: Daegu FC
- Number: 74

Youth career
- 2002–2004: Yuseong BST High School
- 2002–2003: → FC Metz (KFA Youth Project)
- 2005–2008: Korea University

Senior career*
Years	Team	Apps	(Gls)
2009–2010	Gyeongnam FC	53	(10)
2011–2017	Suwon Samsung Bluewings	71	(3)
2014–2015	→ Ansan Police FC (army)	32	(3)
2017–2020	Chiangrai United	59	(2)
2021–	Daegu FC	112	(0)

International career^{‡}
2003	South Korea U-17	6	(1)
2003–2005	South Korea U-20	7	(1)
2010–2011	South Korea	17	(0)
- * Club domestic league appearances and goals as of 5 January 2026 ‡ National team caps and goals as of 15 November 2011

Lee Yong-rae (Korean: 이용래; Hanja: 李容來; born 17 April 1986) is a South Korean football player who plays as a midfielder for Daegu FC. Although he mainly plays as defensive midfield for both club and the national team, his tactical awareness allows him to operate as a box-to-box midfielder, side midfielder, and full-back in emergencies.

== Club career statistics ==
As of 24 February 2024

Club performance			League		Cup		League Cup		Continental		Other		Total	
Season	Club	League	Apps	Goals	Apps	Goals	Apps	Goals	Apps	Goals	Apps	Goals	Apps	Goals
South Korea			League		KFA Cup		League Cup		Asia		Other		Total	
2009	Gyeongnam FC	K League 1	26	6	2	0	4	0	-		-		32	6
2010	Gyeongnam FC	K League 1	27	4	1	0	5	0	-		-		33	4
2011	Suwon Samsung Bluewings	K League 1	26	0	3	1	0	0	10	0	-		39	1
2012	Suwon Samsung Bluewings	K League 1	25	2	3	0	-		-		-		28	2
2013	Suwon Samsung Bluewings	K League 1	20	1	1	0	-		0	0	-		21	1
2014	Ansan Police	K League 2	32	3	0	0	-		-		1	0	33	3
2015	Ansan Police	K League 2	14	1	1	0	-		-		-		15	1
2016	Suwon Samsung Bluewings	K League 1	13	0	1	0	-		1	0	-		15	0
2017	Suwon Samsung Bluewings	K League 1	19	2	3	0	-		6	0	-		28	2
Thailand			League		Thai FA Cup		Thai League Cup		Asia		Other		Total	
2018	Chiangrai United	Thai League 1	25	0	4	0	4	1	2	0	1	0	36	1
2019	Chiangrai United	Thai League 1	24	2	4	1	2	0	2	1	1	0	33	4
2020–21	Chiangrai United	Thai League 1	10	0	0	0	-		5	0	1	1	16	1
South Korea			League		KFA Cup		League Cup		Asia		Other		Total	
2021	Daegu FC	K League 1	24	0	1	0	-		7	0	-		32	0
2022	Daegu FC	K League 1	28	0	2	0	-		6	0	-		36	0
2023	Daegu FC	K League 1	29	0	0	0	-		-		-		29	0
Total	South Korea		283	19	18	1	9	0	30	0	1	0	341	20
Total	Thailand		59	2	8	1	6	1	9	1	3	1	85	6
Career total			342	21	26	2	15	1	39	1	4	1	426	26

== Honours ==
- Hyundai Oilbank K-League Challenge Best 11 Midfield Division : 2014
- Winning the 37th National High School Football Championship : 2004

Chiangrai United

- Thai League 1 (1): 2019
- Thai FA Cup (1): 2018
- Thai League Cup (1): 2018
- Thailand Champions Cup (2): 2018, 2020
