= Yang Sang-min =

South Korean footballer

Yang Sang-Min 양상민
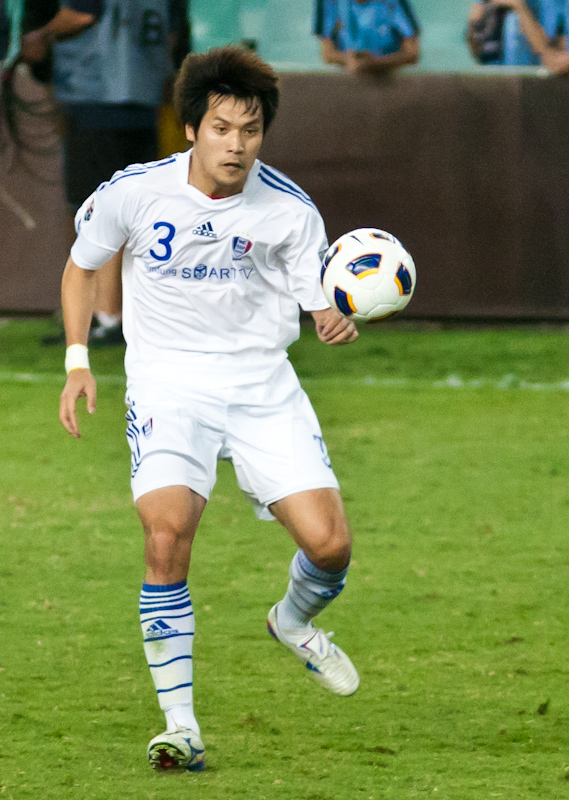

Personal information
- Full name: Yang Sang-Min
- Date of birth: February 24, 1984 (age 42)
- Place of birth: Incheon, South Korea
- Height: 1.82 m (6 ft 0 in)
- Position: Defender

Youth career
- 2002–2004: Soongsil University

Senior career*
Years	Team	Apps	(Gls)
2005–2007	Chunnam Dragons	40	(3)
2007–2022	Suwon Samsung Bluewings	237	(6)
2013–2014	→ Police (army)	68	(2)

International career^{‡}
2005–2006	South Korea	2	(0)
- * Club domestic league appearances and goals ‡ National team caps and goals as of 4 April 2009

Yang Sang-Min (Korean: 양상민; born February 24, 1984) is a South Korean football player.

== Club career statistics ==
Club performance			League		Cup		League Cup		Continental		Total	
Season	Club	League	Apps	Goals	Apps	Goals	Apps	Goals	Apps	Goals	Apps	Goals
South Korea			League		KFA Cup		League Cup		Asia		Total	
2005	Chunnam Dragons	K League 1	17	1	3	0	12	0	-		32	1
2006	Chunnam Dragons	K League 1	21	2	2	0	5	1	-		28	3
2007	Chunnam Dragons	K League 1	2	0	0	0	0	0	1	0	3	0
2007	Suwon Samsung Bluewings	K League 1	22	0	2	0	9	0	-		33	0
2008	Suwon Samsung Bluewings	K League 1	15	0	2	0	7	0	-		24	0
2009	Suwon Samsung Bluewings	K League 1	16	0	4	1	2	0	6	0	28	2
2010	Suwon Samsung Bluewings	K League 1	20	0	4	0	3	0	7	0	34	0
2011	Suwon Samsung Bluewings	K League 1	23	0	2	0	1	0	8	1	34	1
Total	South Korea		136	3	19	1	39	1	22	1	216	6
Career total			136	3	19	1	39	1	22	1	216	6
