= Oh Beom-seok =

South Korean footballer (born 1984)

Oh Beom-Seok 오범석
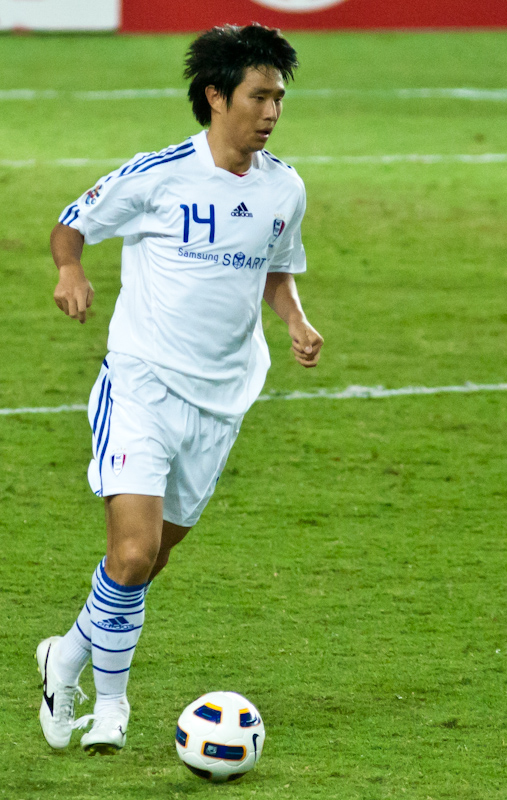

Personal information
- Date of birth: 29 July 1984 (age 42)
- Place of birth: Pohang, South Korea
- Height: 1.81 m (5 ft 11 in)
- Position: Right back

Team information
- Current team: Yongin FC (Analysis coach)

Senior career*
Years	Team	Apps	(Gls)
2003–2007	Pohang Steelers	108	(5)
2007	→ Yokohama FC (loan)	10	(0)
2008–2009	Krylia Sovetov	28	(0)
2009–2010	Ulsan Hyundai	35	(4)
2011–2015	Suwon Samsung Bluewings	108	(1)
2013–2014	→ Ansan Police (army)	39	(4)
2016	Hangzhou Greentown	21	(0)
2017–2019	Gangwon	80	(2)
2020–2021	Pohang Steelers	27	(0)
Total		456	(16)

International career
2003	South Korea U-20	11	(0)
2006	South Korea U-23	4	(1)
2005–2013	South Korea	43	(2)
- * Club domestic league appearances and goals

- Oh Beom-seok
- Hangul: 오범석
- Hanja: 吳範錫
- RR: O Beomseok
- MR: O Pŏmsŏk

Oh Beom-Seok (Korean: 오범석; born 29 July 1984) is a South Korean former professional footballer who played as a right back and currently Analysis coach for Yongin FC.

He played at the 2003 FIFA World Youth Championship in the United Arab Emirates and played in all matches as South Korea advanced to the round of 16. He also played for South Korea at the 2007 AFC Asian Cup. He was a defender during the 2010 FIFA World Cup (#2).

In 2008, he signed for Russian side Krylia Sovetov, becoming teammates with Choe Myong-Ho of North Korea. Oh left Krylia Sovetov in August 2009 after the club did not pay his salary regularly. Known for his rough style of play, he is nicknamed "The King of Fouls".

He has a sister who was a former 2003 Miss Korea runner-up, Oh Yu-mi.

== Career statistics ==
=== Club ===
As of 4 December 2021

Club performance			League		Cup		League Cup		Continental		Total	
Season	Club	League	Apps	Goals	Apps	Goals	Apps	Goals	Apps	Goals	Apps	Goals
South Korea			League		KFA Cup		League Cup		Asia		Total	
2003	Pohang Steelers	K League 1	1	0	0	0	—		—		1	0
2004	Pohang Steelers	K League 1	14	0	1	0	11	1	—		26	1
2005	Pohang Steelers	K League 1	21	2	2	0	12	0	—		35	2
2006	Pohang Steelers	K League 1	23	1	1	0	10	1	—		34	2
2007	Pohang Steelers	K League 1	11	0	1	0	5	0	—		17	0
Japan			League		Emperor's Cup		League Cup		Asia		Total	
2007	Yokohama FC	J1 League	10	0	0	0	—		—			
Russia			League		Russian Cup		League Cup		Europe		Total	
2008	Krylia Sovetov Samara	Russian Premier League	27	0	1	0	—		—		28	0
2009	Krylia Sovetov Samara	Russian Premier League	1	0	0	0	—		—		1	0
South Korea			League		KFA Cup		League Cup		Asia		Total	
2009	Ulsan Hyundai	K League 1	12	0	0	0	2	0	—		14	0
2010	Ulsan Hyundai	K League 1	21	4	1	0	0	0	—		22	4
2011	Suwon Bluewings	K League 1	28	0	4	0	1	0	8	0	41	0
2012	Suwon Bluewings	K League 1	39	0	2	0	—		—		41	0
2013	Ansan Police (army)	K League 2	23	2	1	0	—		—		24	2
2014	Ansan Police (army)	K League 2	16	2	1	0	—		—		17	2
2014	Suwon Bluewings	K League 1	11	0	—		—		—		11	0
2015	Suwon Bluewings	K League 1	29	1	1	0	—		7	1	37	2
China			League		Chinese FA Cup				Asia		Total	
2016	Hangzhou Green Town	Chinese Super League	21	0	0	0	—		—		21	0
South Korea			League		KFA Cup				Asia		Total	
2017	Gangwon FC	K League 1	28	0	1	0	—		—		29	0
2018	Gangwon FC	K League 1	32	1	0	0	—		—		32	1
2019	Gangwon FC	K League 1	17	0	1	0	—		—		18	0
2020	Pohang Steelers	K League 1	9	0	0	0	0	0	0	0	9	0
2021	Pohang Steelers	K League 1	18	0	0	0	—		0	0	18	0
Total	South Korea		397	15	17	0	41	2	15	1	470	18
Total	Japan		10	0	0	0	—		—		10	0
Total	Russia		28	0	1	0	—		—		29	0
Total	China		21	0	0	0	—		—		21	0
Career total			456	15	18	0	41	2	15	1	530	18

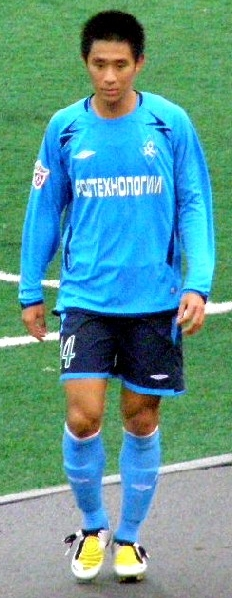
Oh Beom-Seok in 2008.

=== International ===
Korea Republic national team
Year	Apps	Goals
2005	2	0
2006	1	0
2007	9	0
2008	9	0
2009	9	1
2010	9	1
2011	0	0
2012	3	0
2013	1	0
Total	43	2

=== International goals ===
Goal	Date	Venue	Opponent	Score	Result	Competition
1	14 October 2009	Seoul, South Korea	Senegal	1 goal	2–0	Friendly match
2	18 January 2010	Málaga, Spain	Finland	1 goal	2–0	Friendly match

== Honours ==
Entertainment

Name of the award ceremony, year presented, category, nominee of the award, and the result of the nomination
Award ceremony	Year	Category	Nominee / Work	Result	Ref.
SBS Entertainment Awards	2022	Leader of the Year Award (Note: with Ha Seok-ju, Kim Byung-ji, Kim Tae-young, Choi Jin-cheul, Choi Sung-yong, Lee Eul-yong, Heon Young-min, Lee Young-pyo, Oh Beom-seok, Cho Jae-jin and Baek Ji-hoon)	Kick a Goal	Won	
