= Shin Se-gye =

South Korean footballer (born 1990)

Shin Se-Gye
Personal information
- Full name: Shin Se-Gye
- Date of birth: 16 September 1990
- Place of birth: South Korea
- Height: 1.78 m (5 ft 10 in)
- Positions: Midfielder; right-back

Team information
- Current team: Suwon FC
- Number: 30

Youth career
- 2009–2010: Sungkyunkwan University

Senior career*
Years	Team	Apps	(Gls)
2011–2019	Suwon Samsung Bluewings	121	(2)
2017–2018	→ Sangju Sangmu (army)	35	(0)
2020–2021	Gangwon FC	42	(1)
2022–	Suwon FC	18	(0)
- * Club domestic league appearances and goals as of 31 August 2022

Shin Se-Gye (Korean: 신세계; born 16 September 1990) is a South Korean football player, who plays for Suwon FC.

== Club career ==
Shin, having spent his youth career at Sungkyunkwan University, entered the 2011 K-League draft intake, and was selected by Suwon Bluewings for the 2011 season. His professional debut came in week five of the K-League, against Jeonbuk Hyundai Motors. In a goalless draw, Shin finished the match with a yellow card. A little over a month later, in Suwon's final group game of the 2011 AFC Champions League, against Chinese Super League club Shanghai Shenhua F.C., Lee scored his first goal, helping Suwon to a 3–0 win.

== Club career statistics ==
As of 8 January 2014

Appearances and goals by club, season and competition
Club	Season	League			KFA Cup		League Cup		Asia		Total	
Club	Season	Division	Apps	Goals	Apps	Goals	Apps	Goals	Apps	Goals	Apps	Goals
Suwon Bluewings	2011	K League 1	10	0	1	0	1	0	3	1	15	1
Suwon Bluewings	2012	K League 1	7	0	0	0	—		—		7	0
Suwon Bluewings	2013	K League 1	16	0	1	0	—		1	0	18	0
Career total			33	0	2	0	1	0	4	1	40	1
