= Choi Sung-hwan (footballer) =

South Korean footballer (born 1981)

Choi Sung-Hwan
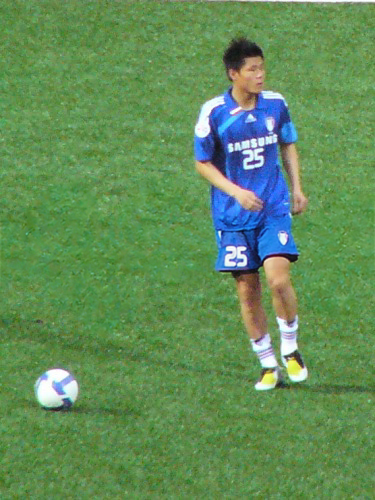
- Choi in 2009

Personal information
- Date of birth: 6 October 1981 (age 45)
- Place of birth: Seoul, South Korea
- Height: 1.84 m (6 ft 0 in)
- Position: Centre-back

Youth career
- 2001–2004: Jeonju University

Senior career*
Years	Team	Apps	(Gls)
2005–2006	Daegu FC	28	(1)
2007–2012	Suwon Bluewings	42	(0)
2012–2013	Ulsan Hyundai	5	(0)
2014	Gwangju FC	5	(0)
2015–?	Gyeongnam FC		
- * Club domestic league appearances and goals

Choi Sung-Hwan (Korean: 최성환; born 6 October 1981) is a South Korean former professional footballer who played as a centre-back for Daegu FC, Suwon Samsung Bluewings, Ulsan Hyundai, Gwangju FC, and Gyeongnam FC.
