= Suwon Samsung Bluewings in international competitions =

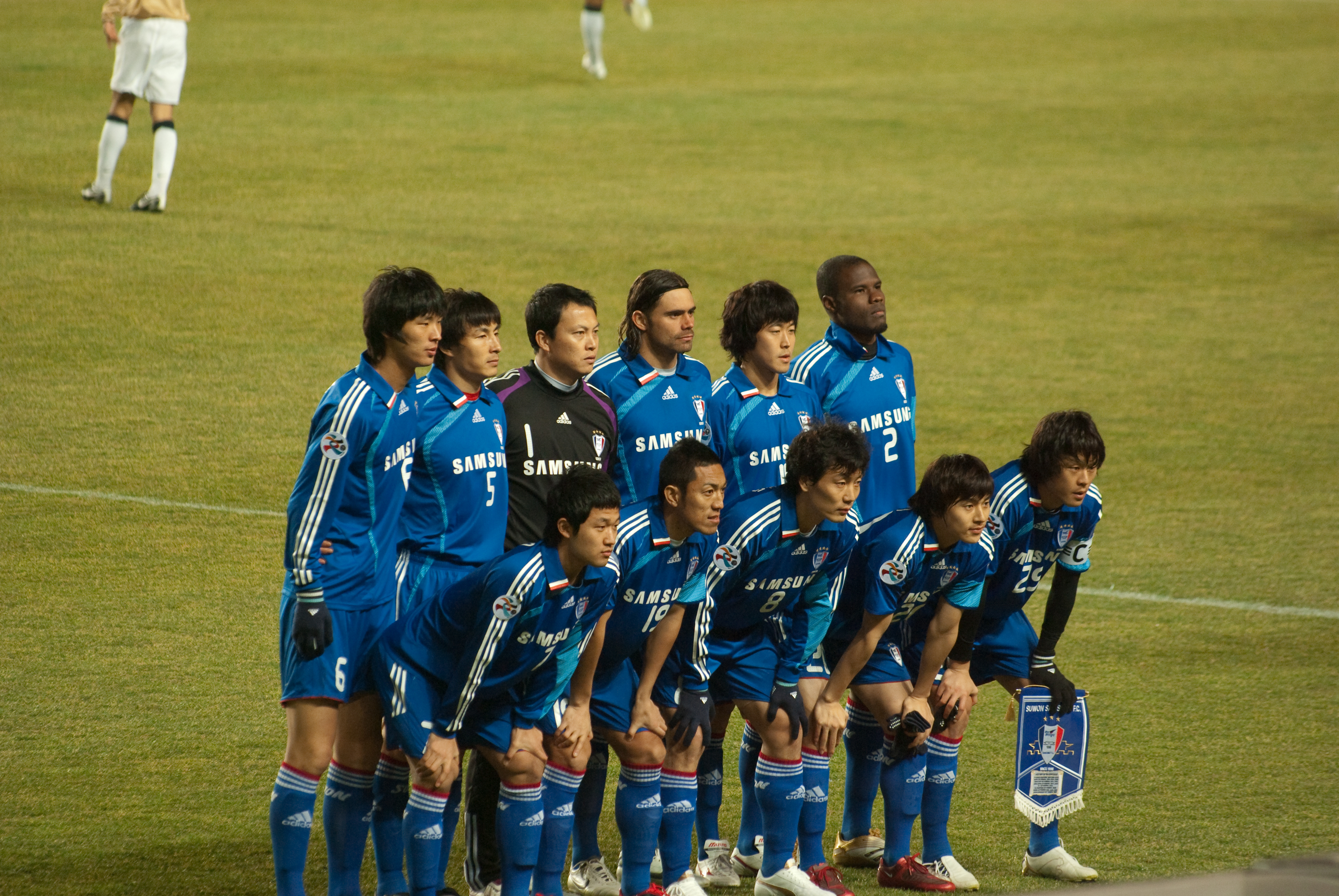
ACL 2009 vs Kashima Antlers Squad

Suwon Samsung Bluewings is a South Korean professional football club based in Suwon, South Korea, who currently play in the K League Classic. Suwon Samsung Bluewings' first participation in Asian competition came during the 1999 season, when they competed in the Asian Club Championship., Their first match was against PSIS Semarang of Indonesia.

Suwon Samsung Bluewings have won the AFC Champions League two times. Their most recent participation in the competition was in 2015.

== Matches ==
=== Competition ===
| Season | Competition | Date | Round | Opponent | Result | Scorer(s) |
|---|---|---|---|---|---|---|
| 1997–98 | Asian Cup Winners' Cup | 1997-08-23 | First Round | (Vietnam) Hải Quan | 5–1 (H) | Lee Ki-Keun, Badea, Lee Jin-Haeng(2), Olăroiu |
| 1997–98 | Asian Cup Winners' Cup | 1997-08-30 | First Round | (Vietnam) Hải Quan | 4–0 (A) | Matveyev, Lee Ki-Keun, Choi Sung-Ho, Lee Jin-Haeng |
| 1997–98 | Asian Cup Winners' Cup | 1997-11-08 | Second Round | Singapore Armed Forces | 2–0 (A) | Shin Sung-Hwan, Laktionov |
| 1997–98 | Asian Cup Winners' Cup | 1997-11-15 | Second Round | Singapore Armed Forces | 6–0 (H) | Badea(2), Barbu, Choi Sung-Ho, Shin Sung-Hwan, Unknown |
| 1997–98 | Asian Cup Winners' Cup | 1997-12-06 | Quarterfinal | (Indonesia) PSM Makassar | 1–0 (A) | Unknown |
| 1997–98 | Asian Cup Winners' Cup | 1997-12-14 | Quarterfinal | (Indonesia) PSM Makassar | 12–0 (H) | Lee Ki-Hyung(3), Ko Jong-Soo(3), Unknown(6) |
| 1997–98 | Asian Cup Winners' Cup | 1998-04-10 | Semifinal | (China) Beijing Guoan | 5–0 | Olăroiu, Lee Ki-Hyung, Park Kun-Ha(2), Cho Hyun |
| 1997–98 | Asian Cup Winners' Cup | 1998-04-12 | Final | (Saudi Arabia) Al-Nassr | 0–1 | |
| 1999–00 | Asian Club Championship | 1999-08-15 | First Round | (Indonesia) PSIS Semarang | 3–2 (A) | Cho Man-Keun, Jang Ji-Hyun, Own Goal |
| 1999–00 | Asian Club Championship | 1999-09-01 | First Round | (Indonesia) PSIS Semarang | 6–2 (H) | Olăroiu, Jang Ji-Hyun, Park Kun-Ha, Parakhnevych, Drakulić, Shin Hong-Gi |
| 1999–00 | Asian Club Championship | 1999-10-02 | Second Round | (Vietnam) Thể Công | 1–1 (A) | Jo Man-Keun |
| 1999–00 | Asian Club Championship | 1999-10-16 | Second Round | (Vietnam) Thể Công | 6–0 (H) | Unknown(6) |
| 1999–00 | Asian Club Championship | 2000-02-25 | Quarterfinal | (Japan) Kashima Antlers | 1–1 | Park Kun-Ha |
| 1999–00 | Asian Club Championship | 2000-02-27 | Quarterfinal | (Thailand) Sinthana | 4–0 | Lee Gi-Beom, Shin Hong-Gi, Park Kun-Ha, Parakhnevych |
| 1999–00 | Asian Club Championship | 2000-02-29 | Quarterfinal | (Japan) Júbilo Iwata | 0–1 | |
| 1999–00 | Asian Club Championship | 2000-04-20 | Semifinal | (Saudi Arabia) Al-Hilal | 0–1 | |
| 1999–00 | Asian Club Championship | 2000-04-20 | Third place match | (Iran) Persepolis | 0–1 | |
| 2000–01 | Asian Club Championship | 2000-09-21 | Second Round | (Maldives) Hurriyya SC | 2–1 (H) | Lee Gi-Beom, Jang Ji-Hyun |
| 2000–01 | Asian Club Championship | 2000-09-27 | Second Round | (Maldives) Hurriyya SC | 0–0 (A) | |
| 2000–01 | Asian Club Championship | 2001-03-21 | Quarterfinal | (Japan) Júbilo Iwata | 0–3 | |
| 2000–01 | Asian Club Championship | 2001-03-23 | Quarterfinal | (Indonesia) PSM Makassar | 8–1 | Seo Jung-Won(3), Sandro Cardoso(2), Park Kun-Ha, Ko Jong-Soo(2) |
| 2000–01 | Asian Club Championship | 2001-03-25 | Quarterfinal | (China) Shandong Luneng | 6–0 | Ko Jong-Soo(2), Laktionov, Seo Dong-Won(2), Sabo |
| 2000–01 | Asian Club Championship | 2001-05-24 | Semifinal | (Iran) Persepolis | 2–1 | Seo Jung-Won, Park Kun-Ha |
| 2000–01 | Asian Club Championship | 2001-05-26 | Final | (Japan) Júbilo Iwata | 1–0 | Sandro Cardoso |
| 2001 | Asian Super Cup | 2001-08-04 | Final 1st leg | (Saudi Arabia) Al-Shabab | 2–2 (H) | Laktionov, Sandro Cardoso |
| 2001 | Asian Super Cup | 2001-08-10 | Final 2nd leg | (Saudi Arabia) Al-Shabab | 2–1 (A) | Lee Ki-Hyung, Seo Jung-Won |
| 2001–02 | Asian Club Championship | 2001-11-24 | Second Round | (Sri Lanka) Saunders SC | 18–0 (H) | Unknown(18) |
| 2001–02 | Asian Club Championship | 2001-12-01 | Second Round | (Sri Lanka) Saunders SC | 3–0 (A) | Saunders did not show up for the 2nd leg |
| 2001–02 | Asian Club Championship | 2002-02-17 | Quarterfinal | (South Korea) Anyang LG Cheetahs | 0–0 | |
| 2001–02 | Asian Club Championship | 2002-02-19 | Quarterfinal | (Japan) Kashima Antlers | 2–0 | Seo Jung-Won, Son Dae-Ho |
| 2001–02 | Asian Club Championship | 2002-02-21 | Quarterfinal | (China) Dalian Shide | 2–0 | Sandro Cardoso(2) |
| 2001–02 | Asian Club Championship | 2002-04-03 | Semifinal | (Uzbekistan) Nasaf Qarshi | 3–0 | Avdić, Seo Jung-Won, Lee Sun-Woo |
| 2001–02 | Asian Club Championship | 2002-04-05 | Final | (South Korea) Anyang LG Cheetahs | 0–0 (4–2p) | |
| 2002 | Asian Super Cup | 2001-08-04 | Final 1st leg | (Saudi Arabia) Al-Hilal | 1–0 (H) | Lee Ki-Hyung |
| 2002 | Asian Super Cup | 2001-08-10 | Final 2nd leg | (Saudi Arabia) Al-Hilal | 0–1 (4–2p) (A) | |
| 2005 | A3 Champions Cup | 2005-02-13 | Group Stage | (China) Shenzhen Jianlibao | 3–1 | Nádson(2), Kim Dae-Eui |
| 2005 | A3 Champions Cup | 2005-02-16 | Group Stage | (South Korea) Pohang Steelers | 2–2 | Nádson(2) |
| 2005 | A3 Champions Cup | 2005-02-19 | Group Stage | (Japan) Yokohama F. Marinos | 3–1 | Nádson(2), Kim Dong-Hyun |
| 2005 | AFC Champions League | 2005-03-09 | Group Stage | (Vietnam) Hoang Anh Gia Lai | 5–1 (A) | Ahn Hyo-Yeon(2), Nádson, Neretljak, Park Kun-Ha |
| 2005 | AFC Champions League | 2005-03-16 | Group Stage | (China) Shenzhen Jianlibao | 0–0 (H) | |
| 2005 | AFC Champions League | 2005-04-06 | Group Stage | (Japan) Júbilo Iwata | 1–0 (A) | Nádson |
| 2005 | AFC Champions League | 2005-04-20 | Group Stage | (Japan) Júbilo Iwata | 2–1 (H) | Kim Nam-Il, Sandro Cardoso |
| 2005 | AFC Champions League | 2005-05-11 | Group Stage | (Vietnam) Hoang Anh Gia Lai | 6–0 (H) | Kim Dong-Hyun, Lee Byung-Keun(2), Cho Won-Hee, Sandro Cardoso, Kim Do-Heon |
| 2005 | AFC Champions League | 2005-05-25 | Group Stage | (China) Shenzhen Jianlibao | 0–1 (A) | |
| 2007 | World Series of Football | 2007-07-17 | Friendly Match | (England) Chelsea | 0–1 | |
| 2007 | World Series of Football | 2007-07-21 | Friendly Match | (Mexico) UANL Tigres | 0–3 | |
| 2009 | Lunar New Year Cup | 2009-01-26 | Semifinal | (Czech Republic) Sparta Prague | 0–0 (8–9p) | |
| 2009 | Lunar New Year Cup | 2009-01-29 | Third Place Match | Hong Kong League XI | 0–0 (5–4p) | |
| 2009 | Pan-Pacific Championship | 2009-02-18 | Semifinal | (China) Shandong Luneng | 1–0 | Cho Yong-Tae |
| 2009 | Pan-Pacific Championship | 2009-02-21 | Final | (United States) Los Angeles Galaxy | 1–1 (4–2p) | Own goal |
| 2009 | AFC Champions League | 2009-03-11 | Group Stage | (Japan) Kashima Antlers | 4–1 (H) | Li Weifeng, Edu, Hong Soon-Hak, Park Hyun-Beom |
| 2009 | AFC Champions League | 2009-03-18 | Group Stage | Singapore Armed Forces | 2–0 (A) | Edu(2) |
| 2009 | AFC Champions League | 2009-04-07 | Group Stage | (China) Shanghai Shenhua | 1–2 (A) | Li Weifeng |
| 2009 | AFC Champions League | 2009-04-22 | Group Stage | (China) Shanghai Shenhua | 2–1 (H) | Lee Sang-ho, Bae Ki-Jong |
| 2009 | AFC Champions League | 2009-05-05 | Group Stage | (Japan) Kashima Antlers | 0–3 (A) | |
| 2009 | AFC Champions League | 2009-05-19 | Group Stage | Singapore Armed Forces | 3–1 (H) | Bae Ki-Jong, Lee Sang-ho, Seo Dong-Hyun |
| 2009 | AFC Champions League | 2009-06-24 | Round of 16 | (Japan) Nagoya Grampus | 1–2 (A) | Edu |
| 2010 | Saitama City Cup | 2010-02-13 | Final | (Japan) Omiya Ardija | 0–5 | |
| 2010 | AFC Champions League | 2010-02-24 | Group Stage | (Japan) Gamba Osaka | 0–0 (H) | |
| 2010 | AFC Champions League | 2010-03-10 | Group Stage | Singapore Armed Forces | 2–0 (A) | Juninho, José Mota |
| 2010 | AFC Champions League | 2010-03-23 | Group Stage | (China) Henan Construction | 2–0 (A) | José Mota(2) |
| 2010 | AFC Champions League | 2010-03-31 | Group Stage | (China) Henan Construction | 2–0 (H) | José Mota, Kim Dae-Eui |
| 2010 | AFC Champions League | 2010-04-13 | Group Stage | (Japan) Gamba Osaka | 1–2 (A) | José Mota |
| 2010 | AFC Champions League | 2010-04-27 | Group Stage | Singapore Armed Forces | 6–2 (H) | José Mota(2), Lee Hyun-Jin, Kwak Hee-Ju, Yeom Ki-Hun(2) |
| 2010 | AFC Champions League | 2010-05-11 | Round of 16 | (China) Beijing Guoan | 2–0 (H) | José Mota(2) |
| 2010 | AFC Champions League | 2010-09-15 | Quarterfinal | (South Korea) Seongnam Ilhwa Chunma | 1–4 (A) | Yeom Ki-Hun |
| 2010 | AFC Champions League | 2010-09-22 | Quarterfinal | (South Korea) Seongnam Ilhwa Chunma | 2–0 (H) | Yeom Ki-Hun, Lee Sang-ho |
| 2011 | AFC Champions League | 2011-03-02 | Group Stage | (Australia) Sydney FC | 0–0 (A) | |
| 2011 | AFC Champions League | 2011-03-16 | Group Stage | (China) Shanghai Shenhua | 4–0 (H) | Ha Tae-Goon(3), Oh Jang-Eun |
| 2011 | AFC Champions League | 2011-04-06 | Group Stage | (Japan) Kashima Antlers | 1–1 (H) | Yeom Ki-Hun |
| 2011 | AFC Champions League | 2011-04-19 | Group Stage | (Japan) Kashima Antlers | 1–1 (A) | Yeom Ki-Hun |
| 2011 | AFC Champions League | 2011-05-03 | Group Stage | (Australia) Sydney FC | 3–1 (H) | Ha Tae-Goon, Neretljak, Yeom Ki-Hun |
| 2011 | AFC Champions League | 2011-05-10 | Group Stage | (China) Shanghai Shenhua | 3–0 (A) | Ha Tae-Goon(2), Shin Se-Gye |
| 2011 | AFC Champions League | 2011-05-25 | Round of 16 | (Japan) Nagoya Grampus | 2–0 (H) | Yeom Ki-Hun, Lee Sang-ho |
| 2011 | AFC Champions League | 2011-09-14 | Quarterfinal | (Iran) Zob Ahan | 1–1 (H) | Park Hyun-Beom |
| 2011 | AFC Champions League | 2011-09-27 | Quarterfinal | (Iran) Zob Ahan | 2–1 (A) | Yang Sang-Min, Neretljak |
| 2011 | AFC Champions League | 2011-10-19 | Semifinal | (Qatar) Al-Sadd | 0–2 (H) | |
| 2011 | AFC Champions League | 2011-10-26 | Semifinal | (Qatar) Al-Sadd | 1–0 (A) | Oh Jang-Eun |
| 2013 | AFC Champions League | 2013-02-27 | Group Stage | (Australia) Central Coast Mariners | 0–0 (A) | |
| 2013 | AFC Champions League | 2013-03-13 | Group Stage | (China) Guizhou Renhe | 0–0 (H) | |
| 2013 | AFC Champions League | 2013-04-03 | Group Stage | (Japan) Kashiwa Reysol | 2–6 (H) | Choi Jae-Soo, Stevica Ristic |
| 2013 | AFC Champions League | 2013-04-09 | Group Stage | (Japan) Kashiwa Reysol | 0–0 (A) | |
| 2013 | AFC Champions League | 2013-04-23 | Group Stage | (Australia) Central Coast Mariners | 0–1 (H) | |
| 2013 | AFC Champions League | 2013-04-30 | Group Stage | (China) Guizhou Renhe | 2–2 (A) | Lee Jong-min, Kwon Chang-hoon |
| 2015 | AFC Champions League | 2015-02-25 | Group Stage | (Japan) Urawa Red Diamonds | 2–1 (H) | Oh Beom-seok, Léo Itaperuna |
| 2015 | AFC Champions League | 2015-03-04 | Group Stage | (China) Beijing Guoan | – (A) | |
| 2015 | AFC Champions League | 2015-03-17 | Group Stage | (Australia) Brisbane Roar | – (A) | |
| 2015 | AFC Champions League | 2015-04-08 | Group Stage | (Australia) Brisbane Roar | – (H) | |
| 2015 | AFC Champions League | 2015-04-21 | Group Stage | (Japan) Urawa Red Diamonds | – (A) | |
| 2015 | AFC Champions League | 2015-05-05 | Group Stage | (China) Beijing Guoan | – (H) | |

=== Friendly ===
18 February 2003

| CE Sabadell FC (Spain) | 2 – 0 | (South Korea) Suwon Samsung Bluewings |

Estadi de la Nova Creu Alta, Sabadell

29 July 2004
19:00 UTC+9

| Suwon Samsung Bluewings (South Korea) | 1 – 0 | (Spain) FC Barcelona |
|---|---|---|
| Urumov 77' |

Suwon World Cup Stadium, Suwon
Attendance: 36,000

20 May 2005
19:00 UTC+9

| Suwon Samsung Bluewings (South Korea) | 0 – 1 | (England) Chelsea |
|---|---|---|
| | | Joe Cole 15' |

Suwon World Cup Stadium, Suwon
Attendance: 43,100

11 July 2010
19:00 UTC+9

| Suwon Samsung Bluewings (South Korea) | 0 – 0 | (Japan) Urawa Red Diamonds |

Suwon World Cup Stadium, Suwon
Attendance: 24,000

== Record ==
=== By season ===
| Season | Competition | P | W | D | L | F | A | Round |
|---|---|---|---|---|---|---|---|---|
| 1997–98 | Asian Cup Winners' Cup | 8 | 7 | 0 | 1 | 35 | 2 | RU |
| 1999–00 | Asian Club Championship | 9 | 4 | 2 | 3 | 21 | 9 | 4th |
| 2000–01 | Asian Club Championship | 7 | 5 | 1 | 1 | 19 | 6 | W |
| 2001 | Asian Super Cup | 2 | 1 | 1 | 0 | 4 | 3 | W |
| 2001–02 | Asian Club Championship | 7 | 5 | 2 | 0 | 28 | 0 | W |
| 2002 | Asian Super Cup | 2 | 1 | 0 | 1 | 1 | 1 | W |
| 2005 | A3 Champions Cup | 3 | 2 | 1 | 0 | 8 | 4 | W |
| 2005 | AFC Champions League | 6 | 4 | 1 | 1 | 14 | 3 | GS |
| 2007 | World Series of Football | 2 | 0 | 0 | 2 | 0 | 4 | |
| 2009 | Lunar New Year Cup | 2 | 0 | 2 | 0 | 0 | 0 | 3rd |
| 2009 | Pan-Pacific Championship | 2 | 1 | 1 | 0 | 2 | 1 | W |
| 2009 | AFC Champions League | 7 | 4 | 0 | 3 | 13 | 10 | R16 |
| 2010 | Saitama City Cup | 1 | 0 | 0 | 1 | 0 | 5 | RU |
| 2010 | AFC Champions League | 9 | 6 | 1 | 2 | 18 | 8 | QF |
| 2011 | AFC Champions League | 11 | 6 | 4 | 1 | 18 | 7 | SF |
| 2013 | AFC Champions League | 6 | 0 | 4 | 2 | 4 | 9 | GS |
| 2015 | AFC Champions League | 1 | 1 | | | | | |

=== By competition ===
| Competition | Played | Won | Drawn | Lost | GF | GA |
|---|---|---|---|---|---|---|
| Asian Club Championship / AFC Champions League | 63 | 35 | 15 | 13 | 137 | 53 |
| Asian Cup Winners' Cup | 8 | 7 | 0 | 1 | 35 | 2 |
| Asian Super Cup | 4 | 2 | 1 | 1 | 5 | 4 |
| A3 Champions Cup | 3 | 2 | 1 | 0 | 8 | 4 |
| Lunar New Year Cup | 2 | 0 | 2 | 0 | 0 | 0 |
| Pan-Pacific Championship | 2 | 1 | 1 | 0 | 2 | 1 |
| Saitama City Cup | 1 | 0 | 0 | 1 | 0 | 5 |
| World Series of Football | 2 | 0 | 0 | 2 | 0 | 4 |
| Total | 85 | 47 | 20 | 18 | 187 | 73 |

=== By nation ===
| Nation | Pld | W | D | L | GF | GA | GD | Win% |
|---|---|---|---|---|---|---|---|---|
| Australia | 4 | 1 | 2 | 1 | 3 | 2 | +1 | 25.00 |
| China PR | 16 | 11 | 3 | 2 | 35 | 7 | +28 | 68.75 |
| Czech Republic | 1 | 0 | 1 | 0 | 0 | 0 | +0 | 0.00 |
| England | 1 | 0 | 0 | 1 | 0 | 1 | −1 | 0.00 |
| Hong Kong | 1 | 0 | 1 | 0 | 0 | 0 | +0 | 0.00 |
| Indonesia | 5 | 5 | 0 | 0 | 30 | 5 | +25 | 100.00 |
| Iran | 4 | 2 | 1 | 1 | 5 | 4 | +1 | 50.00 |
| Japan | 20 | 8 | 5 | 7 | 24 | 29 | −5 | 40.00 |
| Korea Republic | 5 | 1 | 3 | 1 | 5 | 6 | −1 | 20.00 |
| Maldives | 2 | 1 | 1 | 0 | 2 | 1 | +1 | 50.00 |
| Mexico | 1 | 0 | 0 | 1 | 0 | 3 | −3 | 0.00 |
| Qatar | 2 | 1 | 0 | 1 | 1 | 2 | −1 | 50.00 |
| Saudi Arabia | 6 | 2 | 1 | 3 | 5 | 6 | −1 | 33.33 |
| Singapore | 6 | 6 | 0 | 0 | 21 | 3 | +18 | 100.00 |
| Sri Lanka | 2 | 2 | 0 | 0 | 21 | 0 | +21 | 100.00 |
| Thailand | 1 | 1 | 0 | 0 | 4 | 0 | +4 | 100.00 |
| USA | 1 | 0 | 1 | 0 | 0 | 0 | +0 | 0.00 |
| Uzbekistan | 1 | 1 | 0 | 0 | 3 | 0 | +3 | 100.00 |
| Vietnam | 6 | 5 | 1 | 0 | 27 | 3 | +24 | 83.33 |
