= 2002 Korean League Cup =

2002 Adidas Cup
Tournament details
- Country: South Korea
- Dates: 17 March – 12 May 2002
- Teams: 10

Final positions
- Champions: Seongnam Ilhwa Chunma (2nd title)
- Runners-up: Ulsan Hyundai Horang-i

Tournament statistics
- Matches played: 44
- Goals scored: 123 (2.8 per match)
- Attendance: 433,216 (9,846 per match)
- Top goal scorer: Saša Drakulić (10 goals)

The 2002 Korean League Cup, also known as the Adidas Cup 2002, was the 16th competition of the Korean League Cup.

== Group stage ==
=== Group A ===
Pos	Team	Pld	W	OW	PW	L	GF	GA	GD	Pts	Qualification
1	Suwon Samsung Bluewings	8	3	1	0	4	13	12	+1	11	Advance to the semi-finals
2	Seongnam Ilhwa Chunma	8	2	1	2	3	17	10	+7	10	Advance to the semi-finals
3	Bucheon SK	8	3	0	1	4	13	15	−2	10	
4	Jeonbuk Hyundai Motors	8	3	0	1	4	10	12	−2	10	
5	Pohang Steelers	8	1	1	1	5	7	11	−4	6	

Source: RSSSF
March 17
15:00 UTC+9

Pohang Steelers	1–2	Suwon Samsung Bluewings
Choi Chul-woo 90+2'		Cho Sung-hwan 39'; Sandro Cardoso 51'

Steelyard Stadium
Attendance: 18,740

March 17
15:00 UTC+9

Seongnam Ilhwa Chunma	6–0	Bucheon SK
Drakulić 14', 33', 37', 55', 73'; Kim Dae-eui 49'

Seongnam 2 Stadium
Attendance: 23,748

March 20
19:00 UTC+9

Jeonbuk Hyundai Motors	1–0	Pohang Steelers
Yang Hyun-jung 1'

Jeonju Stadium
Attendance: 4,955

March 20
19:00 UTC+9

Suwon Samsung Bluewings	2–3	Seongnam Ilhwa Chunma
Laktionov 28'; Seo Jung-won 73'		Shin Tae-yong 9'; Kim Sang-sik 68'; Kim Dae-eui 90'

Suwon Civil Stadium
Attendance: 6,821

March 23
19:00 UTC+9

Suwon Samsung Bluewings	2–0	Jeonbuk Hyundai Motors
Luțu 65'; Seo Jung-won 90'

Suwon Civil Stadium
Attendance: 3,655

March 24
15:00 UTC+9

Bucheon SK	1–1 (a.e.t.)	Pohang Steelers
Parakhnevych 12'		Lee Ki-bu 16'
Penalties
	2–4

Bucheon Stadium
Attendance: 22,157

March 27
19:00 UTC+9

Pohang Steelers	1–0 (a.e.t.)	Seongnam Ilhwa Chunma
Yoon Bo-young 118'

Steelyard Stadium
Attendance: 5,245

April 6
14:00 UTC+9

Jeonbuk Hyundai Motors	3–2	Bucheon SK
Lee Lim-saeng 33' (o.g.); Kim Do-hoon 40'; Jeon Kyung-jun 45+2'		Lee Lim-saeng 13'; Parakhnevych 46' (pen.)

Jeonju Stadium
Attendance: 1,907

April 10
19:00 UTC+9

Bucheon SK	2–0	Suwon Samsung Bluewings
Park Chul 5'; Nam Ki-il 26'

Bucheon Stadium
Attendance: 6,245

April 10
19:00 UTC+9

Seongnam Ilhwa Chunma	2–1 (a.e.t.)	Jeonbuk Hyundai Motors
Hwang Yeon-seok 90'; Shin Tae-yong 91'		Kim Do-hoon 8'

Seongnam 2 Stadium
Attendance: 3,786

April 14
15:00 UTC+9

Seongnam Ilhwa Chunma	1–1 (a.e.t.)	Pohang Steelers
Kim Dae-eui 22'		Petreski 79'
Penalties
	3–1

Seongnam 2 Stadium
Attendance: 11,795

April 14
15:00 UTC+9

Bucheon SK	1–0	Jeonbuk Hyundai Motors
Kim Gi-dong 26'

Bucheon Stadium
Attendance: 19,215

April 20
15:00 UTC+9

Jeonbuk Hyundai Motors	2–2	Seongnam Ilhwa Chunma
Park Sung-bae 18'; Yang Hyun-jung 34'		Kim Dae-eui 14', 72'

Jeonju Stadium
Attendance: 2,815

April 21
15:00 UTC+9

Suwon Samsung Bluewings	3–2	Bucheon SK
Sandro Cardoso 6'; Seo Jung-won 47'; Lee Ki-hyung 90+5'		Lee Seong-jae 15'; Parakhnevych 67' (pen.)

Suwon Civil Stadium
Attendance: 9,187

April 24
19:00 UTC+9

Pohang Steelers	1–2	Jeonbuk Hyundai Motors
Petreski 76'		Park Sung-bae 9' (pen.); Julinho 54'

Steelyard Stadium
Attendance: 5,240

April 24
19:00 UTC+9

Seongnam Ilhwa Chunma	1–1 (a.e.t.)	Suwon Samsung Bluewings
Drakulić 78'		Luțu 61'
Penalties
	5–3

Seongnam 2 Stadium
Attendance: 4,443

April 27
15:00 UTC+9

Pohang Steelers	0–3	Bucheon SK
		Parakhnevych 5'; Dabo 77'; Lee Won-shik 85'

Steelyard Stadium
Attendance: 5,134

April 28
19:00 UTC+9

Jeonbuk Hyundai Motors	1–2 (a.e.t.)	Suwon Samsung Bluewings
Park Sung-bae 32'		Cho Byung-kuk 38'; Lee Ki-hyung 107'

Jeonju Stadium
Attendance: 8,012

May 1
19:00 UTC+9

Suwon Samsung Bluewings	1–2	Pohang Steelers
Seo Jung-won 77'		Choi Chul-woo 54'; Petreski 66'

Suwon Civil Stadium
Attendance: 18,107

May 1
19:00 UTC+9

Bucheon SK	2–2 (a.e.t.)	Seongnam Ilhwa Chunma
Lee Won-shik 83'; Choi Moon-sik 87'		Drakulić 48'; Hwang Yeon-seok 64'
Penalties
	5–3

Bucheon Stadium
Attendance: 13,127

=== Group B ===
Pos	Team	Pld	W	OW	PW	L	GF	GA	GD	Pts	Qualification
1	Anyang LG Cheetahs	8	6	0	1	1	14	4	+10	19	Advance to the semi-finals
2	Ulsan Hyundai Horang-i	8	4	0	1	3	14	9	+5	13	Advance to the semi-finals
3	Jeonnam Dragons	8	1	1	1	5	6	10	−4	6	
4	Daejeon Citizen	8	0	3	0	5	6	11	−5	6	
5	Busan I'Cons	8	2	0	0	6	10	16	−6	6	

Source: RSSSF
March 17
15:00 UTC+9

Ulsan Hyundai Horang-i	2–2 (a.e.t.)	Anyang LG Cheetahs
Lee Kil-yong 34', 57'		André 41'; Han Jung-hwa 78'
Penalties
	4–5

Ulsan Sports Complex
Attendance: 18,274

March 17
15:00 UTC+9

Daejeon Citizen	2–1 (a.e.t.)	Busan I'Cons
Kim Eun-jung 22', 94'		Yoon Hui-jun 30'

Daejeon Sports Complex
Attendance: 14,253

March 20
19:00 UTC+9

Jeonnam Dragons	1–2	Ulsan Hyundai Horang-i
Kim Seung-hyun 58'		Jeong Shung-hoon 22'; Kim Hyun-seok 71'

Gwangyang Football Stadium
Attendance: 15,232

March 20
19:00 UTC+9

Anyang LG Cheetahs	2–0	Daejeon Citizen
Jung Kwang-min 47'; Marcos Denner 89'

Anyang Stadium
Attendance: 8,550

March 24
15:00 UTC+9

Busan I'Cons	1–2	Ulsan Hyundai Horang-i
Urumov 81'		Paulinho 51'; Lee Kil-yong 60'

Busan Gudeok stadium
Attendance: 16,207

March 24
15:00 UTC+9

Anyang LG Cheetahs	1–0	Jeonnam Dragons
Tuta 67'

Anyang Stadium
Attendance: 9,753

March 27
19:00 UTC+9

Ulsan Hyundai Horang-i	0–1 (a.e.t.)	Daejeon Citizen
		Park Kyung-kyu 91'

Ulsan Sports Complex
Attendance: 2,248

March 27
19:00 UTC+9

Jeonnam Dragons	2–1 (a.e.t.)	Busan I'Cons
Kim Jong-hyun 46'; Kim Seung-hyun 98'		Castillo 19'

Gwangyang Football Stadium
Attendance: 5,137

April 10
19:00 UTC+9

Busan I'Cons	1–4	Anyang LG Cheetahs
Shaka 90'		Tuta 18', 61', 85'; Park Jung-hwan 69'

Busan Gudeok stadium
Attendance: 7,158

April 10
19:00 UTC+9

Daejeon Citizen	1–1 (a.e.t.)	Jeonnam Dragons
Kim Eun-jung 29'		Kim Seung-hyun 40' (pen.)
Penalties
	5–6

Daejeon Sports Complex
Attendance: 2,325

April 14
15:00 UTC+9

Daejeon Citizen	0–2	Ulsan Hyundai Horang-i
		Paulinho 67', 74'

Gimcheon Stadium
Attendance: 16,250

April 14
15:00 UTC+9

Busan I'Cons	2–0	Jeonnam Dragons
Kim Chang-o 43', 82'

Busan Gudeok stadium
Attendance: 8,217

April 20
15:30 UTC+9

Jeonnam Dragons	0–1 (a.e.t.)	Daejeon Citizen
		Tak Jun-seok 101'

Gwangyang Football Stadium
Attendance: 5,783

April 21
15:00 UTC+9

Anyang LG Cheetahs	1–0	Busan I'Cons
André 9'

Anyang Stadium
Attendance: 7,558

April 24
19:00 UTC+9

Ulsan Hyundai Horang-i	1–2	Jeonnam Dragons
Paulinho 30'		Sung Han-soo 8', 66'

Ulsan Sports Complex
Attendance: 3,120

April 24
19:00 UTC+9

Daejeon Citizen	1–3	Anyang LG Cheetahs
Kim Eun-jung 86' (pen.)		Marcos Denner 32', 41'; Park Jung-hwan 56'

Daejeon Sports Complex
Attendance: 1,802

April 27
15:00 UTC+9

Ulsan Hyundai Horang-i	5–2	Busan I'Cons
Yoon Hui-jun 26' (o.g.); Shin Byung-ho 35'; Kim Do-kyun 42'; Lee Kil-yong 55', 71'		Urumov 56'; Manić 64'

Ulsan Sports Complex
Attendance: 2,910

April 27
15:30 UTC+9

Jeonnam Dragons	0–1	Anyang LG Cheetahs
		Jung Kwang-min 50'

Gwangyang Football Stadium
Attendance: 5,782

May 1
19:00 UTC+9

Anyang LG Cheetahs	0–0 (a.e.t.)	Ulsan Hyundai Horang-i
Penalties
	3–4

Anyang Stadium
Attendance: 3,428

May 1
19:00 UTC+9

Busan I'Cons	2–0	Daejeon Citizen
Choi Gwang-su 3'; Jeon Woo-keun 23'

Busan Gudeok stadium
Attendance: 3,315

== Knockout stage ==
=== Bracket ===
Semi-finals
A1	Suwon Samsung Bluewings	1
B2	Ulsan Hyundai Horang-i (a.e.t.)	2
B1	Anyang LG Cheetahs	1
A2	Seongnam Ilhwa Chunma	3

Final
Ulsan Hyundai Horang-i	1	1	2
Seongnam Ilhwa Chunma	3	1	4

=== Semi-finals ===
May 5
15:00 UTC+9

Suwon Samsung Bluewings	1–2 (a.e.t.)	Ulsan Hyundai Horang-i
Luțu 52'		Park Jin-seop 71'; Kim Hyun-seok 91'

Suwon Civil Stadium
Attendance: 18,036

May 5
15:00 UTC+9

Anyang LG Cheetahs	1–3	Seongnam Ilhwa Chunma
Marcos Denner 77'		Drakulić 10', 75'; Kim Dae-eui 69'

Anyang Stadium
Attendance: 15,652

=== Final ===
May 8
19:00 UTC+9

Ulsan Hyundai Horang-i	1–3	Seongnam Ilhwa Chunma
Jeong Shung-hoon 77'		Drakulić 44'; Kim Dae-eui 71', 78'

Munsu World Cup Stadium
Attendance: 23,164

May 12
14:00 UTC+9

Seongnam Ilhwa Chunma	1–1	Ulsan Hyundai Horang-i
Kim Sang-sik 57'		Kim Hyun-seok 33'

Seongnam 2 Stadium
Attendance: 24,728

Seongnam Ilhwa Chunma won 4–2 on aggregate.

== Awards ==
Award	Player	Team	Points
Top goalscorer	(Federal Republic of Yugoslavia) Saša Drakulić	Seongnam Ilhwa Chunma	10 goals
Top assist provider	(Brazil) André	Anyang LG Cheetahs	4 assists

== See also ==
- 2002 in South Korean football
- 2002 K League
- 2002 Korean FA Cup
