= 1999 Korean League Cup (Supplementary Cup) =

1999 Daehan Fire Insurance Cup
Tournament details
- Country: South Korea
- Dates: 31 March – 23 May 1999
- Teams: 10

Final positions
- Champions: Suwon Samsung Bluewings (1st title)
- Runners-up: Busan Daewoo Royals

Tournament statistics
- Matches played: 44
- Goals scored: 116 (2.64 per match)
- Top goal scorer(s): Kim Jong-kun; Ahn Jung-hwan (6 goals each)

The Daehan Fire Insurance Cup 1999 was the eleventh competition of the Korean League Cup, and one of two Korean League Cups held in 1999.

== Group stage ==
=== Group A ===
Pos	Team	Pld	W	OW	PW	L	GF	GA	GD	Pts	Qualification
1	Suwon Samsung Bluewings	8	4	1	0	3	14	8	+6	14	Advance to the semi-finals
2	Busan Daewoo Royals	8	4	1	0	3	9	10	−1	14	Advance to the semi-finals
3	Bucheon SK	8	4	0	0	4	11	10	+1	12	
4	Daejeon Citizen	8	3	0	0	5	8	10	−2	9	
5	Pohang Steelers	8	3	0	0	5	10	14	−4	9	

Source: RSSSF
March 31
19:00 UTC+9

Busan Daewoo Royals	1–0	Pohang Steelers
Woo Sung-yong 12'

Busan Gudeok Stadium, Busan
Attendance: 31,668

March 31
19:00 UTC+9

Suwon Samsung Bluewings	2–1	Bucheon SK
Lee Ki-hyung 28'; Drakulić 64'		Yoon Jung-chun 17'

Suwon Civil Stadium, Suwon
Attendance: 12,987

April 3
15:30 UTC+9

Pohang Steelers	3–2	Suwon Samsung Bluewings
Chung Sang-nam 63'; Cho Jin-ho 74'; Jung Dae-hoon 81'		Parakhnevych 2'; Laktionov 66'

Steelyard Stadium, Pohang
Attendance: 29,850

April 4
15:00 UTC+9

Daejeon Citizen	1–2 (a.e.t.)	Busan Daewoo Royals
Sung Han-soo 63'		Ahn Jung-hwan 72' 111'

Daejeon Hanbat Stadium, Daejeon
Attendance: 17,522

April 7
19:00 UTC+9

Busan Daewoo Royals	1–2	Bucheon SK
Manić 7'		Lee Tae-hong 13'; Kim Gi-dong 84'

Busan Gudeok Stadium, Busan
Attendance: 19,418

April 7
19:00 UTC+9

Daejeon Citizen	2–1	Pohang Steelers
Kim Tae-wan 49'; Seo Dong-won 59'		Cho Jin-ho 43'

Daejeon Hanbat Stadium, Daejeon
Attendance: 3,951

April 10
19:00 UTC+9

Suwon Samsung Bluewings	4–0	Busan Daewoo Royals
Drakulić 10'; Lee Jin-haeng 26'; Seo Jung-won 43', 51'

Suwon Civil Stadium, Suwon
Attendance: 12,756

April 10
19:00 UTC+9

Bucheon SK	1–0	Daejeon Citizen
Lee Sung-jae 65'

Mokdong Stadium, Seoul
Attendance: 4,724

April 14
19:00 UTC+9

Daejeon Citizen	0–1	Suwon Samsung Bluewings
		Park Kun-ha 58'

Daejeon Hanbat Stadium, Daejeon
Attendance: 5,101

April 14
19:00 UTC+9

Pohang Steelers	2–1	Bucheon SK
Jung Jae-gon 2', 59'		Kwak Kyung-keun 86'

Steelyard Stadium, Pohang
Attendance: 14,496

April 21
19:00 UTC+9

Bucheon SK	3–0	Pohang Steelers
Kwak Kyung-keun 19', 41'; Lee Won-shik 47'

Mokdong Stadium, Seoul
Attendance: 7,600

April 21
19:00 UTC+9

Suwon Samsung Bluewings	1–0 (a.e.t.)	Daejeon Citizen
Drakulić 92'

Suwon Civil Stadium, Suwon
Attendance: 11,768

April 24
19:00 UTC+9

Daejeon Citizen	3–1	Bucheon SK
Sung Han-soo 20', 57'; Sin Sang-woo 41'		Kwak Kyung-keun 53'

Daejeon Hanbat Stadium, Daejeon
Attendance: 6,494

April 24
19:00 UTC+9

Busan Daewoo Royals	1–0	Suwon Samsung Bluewings
Ahn Jung-hwan 48'

Busan Gudeok Stadium, Busan
Attendance: 28,216

May 5
15:30 UTC+9

Pohang Steelers	2–0	Daejeon Citizen
Jung Jae-gon 11'; Chung Sang-nam 26'

Steelyard Stadium, Pohang
Attendance: 25,322

May 5
15:00 UTC+9

Bucheon SK	0–1	Busan Daewoo Royals
		Manić 49'

Mokdong Stadium, Seoul
Attendance: 20,120

May 8
19:00 UTC+9

Suwon Samsung Bluewings	3–1	Pohang Steelers
Park Kun-ha 58'; Laktionov 60'; Seo Jung-won 84'		Park Sang-in 89'

Suwon Civil Stadium, Suwon
Attendance: 23,810

May 8
19:00 UTC+9

Busan Daewoo Royals	1–2	Daejeon Citizen
Ahn Jung-hwan 90+3' (pen.)		Lim Young-joo 47'; Kim Hyun-min 85'

Busan Gudeok Stadium, Busan
Attendance: 23,437

May 12
19:00 UTC+9

Bucheon SK	2–1	Suwon Samsung Bluewings
Lee Sung-jae 22'; Yoon Jung-hwan 57'		Ko Jong-soo 21'

Mokdong Stadium, Seoul
Attendance: 12,402

May 12
19:00 UTC+9

Pohang Steelers	1–2	Busan Daewoo Royals
Chung Sang-nam 43'		Ahn Jung-hwan 27', 86'

Steelyard Stadium, Pohang
Attendance: 13,155

=== Group B ===
Pos	Team	Pld	W	OW	PW	L	GF	GA	GD	Pts	Qualification
1	Ulsan Hyundai Horang-i	8	4	1	0	3	12	10	+2	14	Advance to the semi-finals
2	Cheonan Ilhwa Chunma	8	4	0	1	3	11	11	0	13	Advance to the semi-finals
3	Jeonbuk Hyundai Dinos	8	3	1	0	4	14	11	+3	11	
4	Anyang LG Cheetahs	8	3	1	0	4	8	9	−1	11	
5	Jeonnam Dragons	8	1	0	1	6	8	12	−4	4	

Source: RSSSF
March 31
19:00 UTC+9

Jeonnam Dragons	1–1 (a.e.t.)	Ulsan Hyundai Horang-i
Choi Moon-sik 32'		Lee Kil-yong 32'
Penalties
	4–2

Gwangyang Football Stadium, Gwangyang
Attendance: 20,923

March 31
15:00 UTC+9

Cheonan Ilhwa Chunma	0–1	Anyang LG Cheetahs
		Baek Hyung-jin 88'

Cheonan Stadium, Cheonan
Attendance: 6,429

April 3
15:00 UTC+9

Jeonbuk Hyundai Dinos	2–1	Jeonnam Dragons
Park Sung-bae 20', 35'		Roh Sang-rae 84' (pen.)

Jeonju Stadium, Jeonju
Attendance: 9,123

April 3
15:00 UTC+9

Ulsan Hyundai Horang-i	2–1	Cheonan Ilhwa Chunma
Lee Kil-yong 48'; Kim Jong-kun 67'		Shin Tae-yong 29'

Ulsan Complex Stadium, Ulsan
Attendance: 21,854

April 7
19:00 UTC+9

Jeonnam Dragons	3–1	Anyang LG Cheetahs
César 25'; Choi Yoon-yeol 59'; Roh Sang-rae 71'		Jung Kwang-min 48'

Gwangyang Football Stadium, Gwangyang
Attendance: 10,152

April 7
15:00 UTC+9

Jeonbuk Hyundai Dinos	1–2 (a.e.t.)	Ulsan Hyundai Horang-i
Ha Eun-chul 56'		Lee Kil-yong 44'; Kim Jong-kun 91'

Jeonju Stadium, Jeonju
Attendance: 4,852

April 14
15:00 UTC+9

Jeonbuk Hyundai Dinos	1–2	Cheonan Ilhwa Chunma
Kim Bong-hyun 22'		Shin Tae-yong 47'; Lee Seok-kyung 53'

Jeonju Stadium, Jeonju
Attendance: 2,153

April 14
19:00 UTC+9

Ulsan Hyundai Horang-i	1–0	Anyang LG Cheetahs
Jang Hyung-seok 43'

Ulsan Complex Stadium, Ulsan
Attendance: 8,534

April 21
19:00 UTC+9

Anyang LG Cheetahs	1–0	Ulsan Hyundai Horang-i
Pelcis 29'

Changwon Civil Stadium, Changwon
Attendance: 22,317

April 21
15:00 UTC+9

Cheonan Ilhwa Chunma	0–3	Jeonbuk Hyundai Dinos
		Choi Jin-cheul 15'; Seo Hyuk-su 45+1', 69'

Cheonan Stadium, Cheonan
Attendance: 3,795

April 24
15:00 UTC+9

Jeonbuk Hyundai Dinos	0–1 (a.e.t.)	Anyang LG Cheetahs
		Kim Gui-hwa 93' (pen.)

Jeonju Stadium, Jeonju
Attendance: 4,732

April 24
19:00 UTC+9

Jeonnam Dragons	0 – 1	Cheonan Ilhwa Chunma
		Lee Seok-kyung 82'

Gwangyang Football Stadium, Gwangyang
Attendance: 14,678

April 28
15:00 UTC+9

Cheonan Ilhwa Chunma	2–1	Jeonnam Dragons
Hwang Yeon-seok 17'; Lee Kyung-soo 43'		Roh Sang-rae 81'

Cheonan Stadium, Cheonan
Attendance: 3,474

May 1
15:00 UTC+9

Anyang LG Cheetahs	1–3	Jeonbuk Hyundai Dinos
Shaka 43'		Park Sung-bae 1'; Ha Eun-chul 73'; Choi Jin-cheul 87'

Gumi Civil Stadium, Gumi
Attendance: 21,325

May 5
15:00 UTC+9

Ulsan Hyundai Horang-i	3–2	Jeonbuk Hyundai Dinos
Kim Hyun-seok 34'; Kim Jong-kun 45+4' (pen.), 61'		Seo Hyuk-su 8'; Park Sung-bae 58'

Ulsan Complex Stadium, Ulsan
Attendance: 28,750

May 5
15:00 UTC+9

Anyang LG Cheetahs	1–0	Jeonnam Dragons
Jang Young-hoon 32'

Mokdong Stadium, Seoul
Attendance: 25,004

May 8
15:30 UTC+9

Jeonnam Dragons	1–2 (a.e.t.)	Jeonbuk Hyundai Dinos
Roh Sang-rae 37'		Myung Jae-yong 61'; Park Sung-bae 97'

Gwangyang Football Stadium, Gwangyang
Attendance: 7,865

May 9
15:00 UTC+9

Cheonan Ilhwa Chunma	3–1	Ulsan Hyundai Horang-i
Park Nam-yeol 34'; Burdin 39'; Jang Dae-il 75'		Kim Jong-kun 58'

Cheonan Stadium, Cheonan
Attendance: 8,617

May 12
19:00 UTC+9

Anyang LG Cheetahs	2–2 (a.e.t.)	Cheonan Ilhwa Chunma
Pelcis 12'; Kabongo 26'		Shin Tae-yong 44', 72' (pen.)
Penalties
	5–6

Anyang Stadium, Anyang
Attendance: 7,564

May 12
19:00 UTC+9

Ulsan Hyundai Horang-i	2–1	Jeonnam Dragons
Kim Jong-kun 32'; An Hong-min 78'		Choi Moon-sik 11'

Ulsan Complex Stadium, Ulsan
Attendance: 17,050

== Knockout stage ==
=== Bracket ===
Semi-finals
A1	Suwon Samsung Bluewings (p)	2 (4)
B2	Cheonan Ilhwa Chunma	2 (2)
B1	Ulsan Hyundai Horang-i	2 (1)
A2	Busan Daewoo Royals (p)	2 (3)

Final
Suwon Samsung Bluewings	1	1	2
Busan Daewoo Royals	0	1	1

=== Semi-finals ===
May 16
15:00 UTC+9

Suwon Samsung Bluewings	2–2 (a.e.t.)	Cheonan Ilhwa Chunma
Seo Jung-won 34'; Shin Hong-gi 90+2' (pen.)		Shin Tae-yong 22' (pen.); Hwang Yeon-seok 48'
Penalties
	4–2

Suwon Civil Stadium, Suwon
Attendance: 25,640

May 16
15:00 UTC+9

Ulsan Hyundai Horang-i	2–2 (a.e.t.)	Busan Daewoo Royals
An Hong-min 12'; Lee Kil-yong 16'		Woo Sung-yong 9'; Kwon Hae-chang 82'
Penalties
	1–3

Ulsan Complex Stadium, Ulsan
Attendance: 28,434

=== Final ===
May 19
19:00 UTC+9

Suwon Samsung Bluewings	1–0	Busan Daewoo Royals
Parakhnevych 76'

Suwon Civil Stadium, Suwon
Attendance: 24,517

May 23
16:00 UTC+9

Busan Daewoo Royals	1–1	Suwon Samsung Bluewings
Turković 17'		Park Kun-ha 51'

Busan Gudeok Stadium, Busan
Attendance: 37,836

Suwon Samsung Bluewings won 2–1 on aggregate.

== Awards ==
Award	Player	Team	Points
Top goalscorer	(South Korea) Kim Jong-kun	Ulsan Hyundai Horang-i	6 goals
Top assist provider	(South Korea) Jo Sung-hwan	Bucheon SK	4 assists

== See also ==
- 1999 in South Korean football
- 1999 Korean League Cup
- 1999 K League
- 1999 Korean FA Cup
