= Lee Woon-jae =

South Korean former football goalkeeper (born 1973)

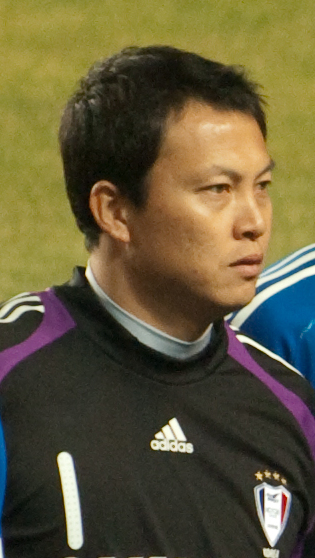
- Lee with Suwon Samsung Bluewings in 2009

Personal information
- Full name: Lee Woon-jae
- Date of birth: 26 April 1973 (age 53)
- Place of birth: Cheongju, Chungbuk, South Korea
- Height: 1.82 m (5 ft 11 1/2 in)
- Position: Goalkeeper

Youth career
- 1986–1988: Cheongju Daeseong Middle School
- 1989–1991: Cheongju Commercial High School

College career
Years	Team	Apps	(Gls)
1992–1995	Kyung Hee University		

Senior career*
Years	Team	Apps	(Gls)
1996–2010	Suwon Samsung Bluewings	267	(0)
2000–2001	→ Sangmu FC (draft)		
2011–2012	Jeonnam Dragons	63	(0)
Total		330	(0)

International career
1994–2002	South Korea U23	24 (Note: Includes nine appearances as an overage player (six appearances in Asian Games, three appearances in friendlies).)	(0)
1993	South Korea B		
1994–2010	South Korea	133	(0)
Medal record
Representing South Korea
Men's football
Summer Universiade
Silver medal – second place	1993 Buffalo
AFC Asian Cup
Bronze medal – third place	2000 Lebanon
Bronze medal – third place	2007 Indonesia/Malaysia /Thailand/Vietnam
Asian Games
Bronze medal – third place	2002 Busan
EAFF Championship
Winner	2003 Japan
Runner-up	2010 Japan
East Asian Games
Gold medal – first place	1993 Shanghai
- * Club domestic league appearances and goals

- Lee Woon-jae
- Hangul: 이운재
- Hanja: 李雲在
- RR: I Unjae
- MR: I Unjae

Lee Woon-jae (Korean: 이운재; born 26 April 1973) is a South Korean football coach and former player. Considered one of the greatest Asian goalkeeper of all time, he played for the South Korea national team at the 1994, 2002 and 2006 FIFA World Cups, and kept three clean sheets while reaching the semi-finals at the 2002 tournament. He is currently working as a goalkeeping coach at the Vietnam national team.

== International career ==
=== Early career ===
Lee was selected for South Korea's squad at the 1992 Summer Olympics, but did not appear in the tournament. He made his senior international debut in 1994 and was included in the squad for the 1994 FIFA World Cup. In the final group match against Germany, the 21-year-old Lee replaced captain Choi In-young at half-time with South Korea trailing 3–0. He conceded no further goals as South Korea recovered to lose 3–2.

Lee later acknowledged that his conditioning deteriorated after the World Cup and that his weight rose above 93 kilograms (205 lb). After being omitted from the 1994 Asian Games squad, he lost nearly 10 kilograms (22 lb) at the urging of Olympic team manager Anatoliy Byshovets and returned to the under-23 team. He played in the March 1996 Olympic qualifying tournament, including the semi-final victory over Iraq which secured qualification for the Atlanta Games, but was diagnosed with pulmonary tuberculosis soon after the tournament and was not selected for the Olympic finals. A later profile also reported that Lee suffered from hepatitis during his first seasons with Suwon, where limited playing time further slowed his recovery. During Lee's absence, Kim Byung-ji became South Korea's established goalkeeper, and Lee was omitted from the squad for the 1998 FIFA World Cup.

Lee returned to the senior team under Huh Jung-moo at the Korea Cup in June 1999. At the 2000 AFC Asian Cup, Huh started Kim Yong-dae in the opening match but turned to Lee for the remaining five, as South Korea finished third. His military service with Sangmu did not interrupt his international career, as he made twenty full international appearances during 2000 and 2001. He played in all three of South Korea's matches at the 2001 FIFA Confederations Cup, saving a penalty from Christophe Dugarry during a 5–0 defeat by France. At the 2002 CONCACAF Gold Cup, he saved two kicks in a quarter-final penalty shoot-out against Mexico, helping South Korea advance 4–2.

=== 2002 World Cup ===
Lee's return produced a long-running competition with Kim for the national-team position. Contemporary accounts characterized Kim as the more instinctive and adventurous goalkeeper, while Lee was considered the more orthodox and stable choice and stronger in dealing with crosses. In January 2001, during Guus Hiddink's second match as manager, Kim carried the ball toward the halfway line and lost possession against Paraguay, after which Hiddink replaced him at half-time and subsequently omitted him from several training camps. Hiddink later said that Kim's conspicuous conduct had been the reason for his omission, although he also praised Kim's ability and recalled him later in 2001.

The incident did not, however, settle the position permanently. Kim started two of South Korea's final three pre-World Cup friendlies, against Scotland and France, while Lee started against England. Five days before the tournament opener, Hiddink said that the two were in similar form and that he might alternate them according to the opponent. Kim later said that he was informed on the morning of the opening match against Poland that Lee would start. Lee's greater stability and his form and concentration during the final training camp were subsequently cited as factors in Hiddink's decision. Although the media frequently described the two as rivals, Lee later characterized Kim as a senior player and mentor from whom he had learned.

Lee kept a clean sheet in South Korea's 2–0 victory over Poland and remained first choice throughout the 2002 FIFA World Cup, playing every minute of the team's seven matches and also keeping clean sheets against Portugal and Spain. In the quarter-final shoot-out against Spain, the first seven kicks were converted before Lee waited for Joaquín and dived to his left to make the only save. Hong Myung-bo converted South Korea's next kick, sending the team to the first World Cup semi-final reached by an Asian side. In the semi-final against Germany, Lee blocked Michael Ballack's initial shot, but Ballack scored from the rebound to give Germany a 1–0 victory.

=== Captaincy and 2006 World Cup ===
Lee played all three matches as South Korea won the inaugural 2003 East Asian Football Championship. He was appointed captain for the 2004 AFC Asian Cup, keeping clean sheets in all three group matches before South Korea lost 4–3 to Iran in the quarter-finals.

On 19 December 2004, Lee saved a late penalty from Ballack as South Korea defeated Germany 3–1 in a friendly at Busan Asiad Main Stadium. Ballack had scored the winning goal from the rebound of Lee's initial save in the 2002 World Cup semi-final; the 2004 result was Germany's first defeat under manager Jürgen Klinsmann.

Lee appeared in all twelve of South Korea's qualifiers for the 2006 FIFA World Cup, keeping six clean sheets as the team qualified for a sixth consecutive tournament. He was named Best Goalkeeper at the 2005 East Asian Football Championship despite South Korea finishing last. Calls for Kim's recall in 2006 briefly revived comparisons between the two, but manager Dick Advocaat retained Lee as first choice and captain and selected Kim Yong-dae and Kim Young-kwang as the other goalkeepers in the final squad.

At the World Cup, Lee captained South Korea in all three group matches. The 2–1 victory over Togo was South Korea's first World Cup win outside its own country. He then made a late one-on-one save from Thierry Henry to preserve a 1–1 draw with France. The final group match against Switzerland was recognized by the Korea Football Association as his 100th international appearance, making him the first South Korean goalkeeper to reach the milestone, although the 2–0 defeat eliminated South Korea from the tournament.

=== 2007 Asian Cup ===
After the injured Kim Nam-il withdrew from the 2007 AFC Asian Cup squad, manager Pim Verbeek appointed Lee captain, citing his experience and the confidence placed in him by the squad. Lee played all six matches and kept four clean sheets, including scoreless draws through extra time in all three knockout matches. In the quarter-final shoot-out against Iran, he saved attempts from captain Mehdi Mahdavikia and Rasoul Khatibi as South Korea won 4–2. South Korea lost the semi-final to Iraq on penalties, but in the third-place match the ten-man team held Japan scoreless for 120 minutes before Lee saved Naotake Hanyu's sixth kick to secure a 6–5 shoot-out victory and automatic qualification for the 2011 AFC Asian Cup. He was subsequently voted goalkeeper of the AFC website's fan-selected Toshiba All-Star XI.

Later in 2007, Lee and teammates Lee Dong-gook, Kim Sang-sik and Woo Sung-yong admitted leaving the team hotel without permission and drinking during the Asian Cup's group stage. A KFA investigation found that Lee had gone out on two occasions and that the outing involving all four players occurred after the defeat by Bahrain. The KFA suspended all four from the national team for one year; Lee, whom it treated as the organizer, also received 80 hours of community service and a three-year ban from KFA-organized competitions, although the latter did not prevent him from playing in the K League. The Asian Football Confederation subsequently removed him from its shortlist for Asian Footballer of the Year.

=== Retirement ===
After completing his community service, Lee was recalled when his national-team suspension expired in November 2008. He returned in a 1–1 friendly draw with Qatar and started South Korea's final six World Cup qualifiers, keeping four clean sheets as the team completed the final round unbeaten.

Lee was selected for his fourth World Cup squad in 2010, but lost the starting position to Jung Sung-ryong shortly before the opening match. The coaching staff later attributed the decision to Jung's stronger form in the final warm-up matches and his aerial ability against Greece. Jung played all four matches as South Korea reached the round of 16, while Lee remained an unused reserve. Lee announced his international retirement after the tournament and made a farewell appearance against Nigeria at Suwon World Cup Stadium on 11 August. He played the opening 28 minutes of the 2–1 victory before being replaced by Jung and received a formal retirement ceremony at half-time. The KFA currently credits Lee with 133 senior international appearances, although contemporary reports described the Nigeria match as his 132nd appearance and RSSSF recognizes 131 full internationals. The differing totals reflect whether several matches against non-national representative selections are classified as senior internationals.

== Style of play ==
Nicknamed the "Spider Hands" in South Korea, Lee did not have good height and rapid pace, but showed great leadership, judgments and harmonies with defenders. He was noted for his predictive ability, which made him strong on penalty shoot-outs. In shoot-outs of his K League career, he won 92% of matches (11 out of 12) and saved 45% of shots (26 out of 58).

== Coaching career ==
In 2025, he was appointed as the goalkeeping coach of the Vietnam national team.

Lee's strength was continuously shown when coaching Vietnam national teams. He signalled to goalkeeper Cao Văn Bình to dive in directions he predicted, leading the player to defeat South Korea in a penalty shoot-out of the 2026 AFC U-23 Asian Cup.

== Career statistics ==
=== Club ===
Appearances and goals by club, season and competition
Club	Season	League			National cup		League cup		Continental		Other		Total	
Club	Season	Division	Apps	Goals	Apps	Goals	Apps	Goals	Apps	Goals	Apps	Goals	Apps	Goals
Suwon Samsung Bluewings	1996	K League	12	0	? (Note: Appearance(s) in Korean FA Cup)	?	1	0	—		—		13	0
Suwon Samsung Bluewings	1997	K League	7	0	?	?	10	0	—		—		17	0
Suwon Samsung Bluewings	1998	K League	18	0	?	?	16	0	—		—		34	0
Suwon Samsung Bluewings	1999	K League	27	0	0	0	12	0	—		1 (Note: Appearance in Korean Super Cup)	0	40	0
Suwon Samsung Bluewings	2002	K League	19	0	4	0	0	0	? (Note: Appearance(s) in Asian Club Championship)	?	—		23	0
Suwon Samsung Bluewings	2003	K League	41	0	1	0	—		—		—		42	0
Suwon Samsung Bluewings	2004	K League	23	0	0	0	3	0	—		—		26	0
Suwon Samsung Bluewings	2005	K League	17	0	3	0	9	0	6	0	2 (Note: One appearance in A3 Champions Cup, one appearance in Korean Super Cup)	0	37	0
Suwon Samsung Bluewings	2006	K League	13	0	1	0	1	0	—		—		15	0
Suwon Samsung Bluewings	2007	K League	25	0	1	0	10	0	—		—		36	0
Suwon Samsung Bluewings	2008	K League	28	0	0	0	11	0	—		—		39	0
Suwon Samsung Bluewings	2009	K League	25	0	5	0	1	0	5	0	1 (Note: Appearance in Pan-Pacific Championship)	0	37	0
Suwon Samsung Bluewings	2010	K League	12	0	2	0	2	0	7	0	—		23	0
Suwon Samsung Bluewings	Total		267	0	17	0	76	0	18	0	4	0	382	0
Sangmu FC (draft)	2000	National Semipro League	?	?	? (Note: Appearance(s) in Korean National Championship, Korean President's Cup)	?	? (Note: Appearance(s) in Korean National Semipro Championship)	?	—		—		?	?
Sangmu FC (draft)	2001	National Semipro League	?	?	?	?	?	?	—		—		?	?
Sangmu FC (draft)	Total		?	?	?	?	?	?	—		—		?	?
Jeonnam Dragons	2011	K League	30	0	2	0	4	0	—		—		36	0
Jeonnam Dragons	2012	K League	33	0	?	?	—		—		—		33	0
Jeonnam Dragons	Total		63	0	2	0	4	0	—		—		69	0
Career total			330	0	19	0	80	0	18	0	4	0	451	0

=== International ===
Appearances and goals by national team and year
National team	Year	Apps	Goals
South Korea	1994	3	0
South Korea	1995	1	0
South Korea	1999	2	0
South Korea	2000	8	0
South Korea	2001	12	0
South Korea	2002	15	0
South Korea	2003	14	0
South Korea	2004	15	0
South Korea	2005	15	0
South Korea	2006	16	0
South Korea	2007	8	0
South Korea	2008	2	0
South Korea	2009	13	0
South Korea	2010	9	0
Career total		133	0

Appearances and goals by competition
Competition	Apps	Goals
Friendlies	55	0
Minor competitions	12	0
EAFF Championship	9	0
CONCACAF Gold Cup	3	0
AFC Asian Cup qualification	7	0
AFC Asian Cup	15	0
FIFA Confederations Cup	3	0
FIFA World Cup qualification	18	0
FIFA World Cup	11	0
Total	133	0

== Filmography ==
=== Television ===
Year	Title	Role	Note(s)	Ref.
2015	Cheongchun FC Hungry Eleven	Himself		
2018	Escape Nest Season 3	Himself		
2019	Let's Eat Dinner Together	Himself	Episode 133	
2022	Gundesliga	Himself		

== Honours ==
Suwon Samsung Bluewings

- K League 1: 1998, 1999, 2004, 2008
- Korean FA Cup: 2002, 2009, 2010
- Korean League Cup: 1999, 1999+, 2005, 2008
- Korean Super Cup: 1999, 2005
- Asian Club Championship: 2001–02
- Asian Super Cup: 2002
- A3 Champions Cup: 2005
- Pan-Pacific Championship: 2009

Sangmu FC

- Korean National Semipro Championship: 2001

South Korea U23

- Asian Games bronze medal: 2002

South Korea B

- Summer Universiade silver medal: 1993
- East Asian Games: 1993

South Korea

- AFC Asian Cup third place: 2000, 2007
- EAFF Championship: 2003

Individual

- K League All-Star: 1998, 1999, 2002, 2003, 2004, 2005, 2006, 2007, 2008, 2009
- K League 1 Best XI: 1999, 2002, 2004, 2008
- FIFA World Cup Fans' All-Star Team: 2002
- EAFF Championship Best Goalkeeper: 2005
- AFC Asian Cup Team of the Tournament: 2007
- K League 1 Most Valuable Player: 2008
- Korean FA Cup Most Valuable Player: 2009
- AFC Opta All-time XI at the FIFA World Cup: 2020

== See also ==
- List of men's footballers with 100 or more international caps

== Notes ==
Sporting positions
Preceded by Hong Myung-bo	South Korea captain 2002–2008	Succeeded by Park Ji-sung
Preceded by Yeom Dong-gyun	Jeonnam Dragons captain 2011–2012	Succeeded by Lee Seung-hee
