= Cosmin Olăroiu =

Romanian footballer and manager (born 1969)

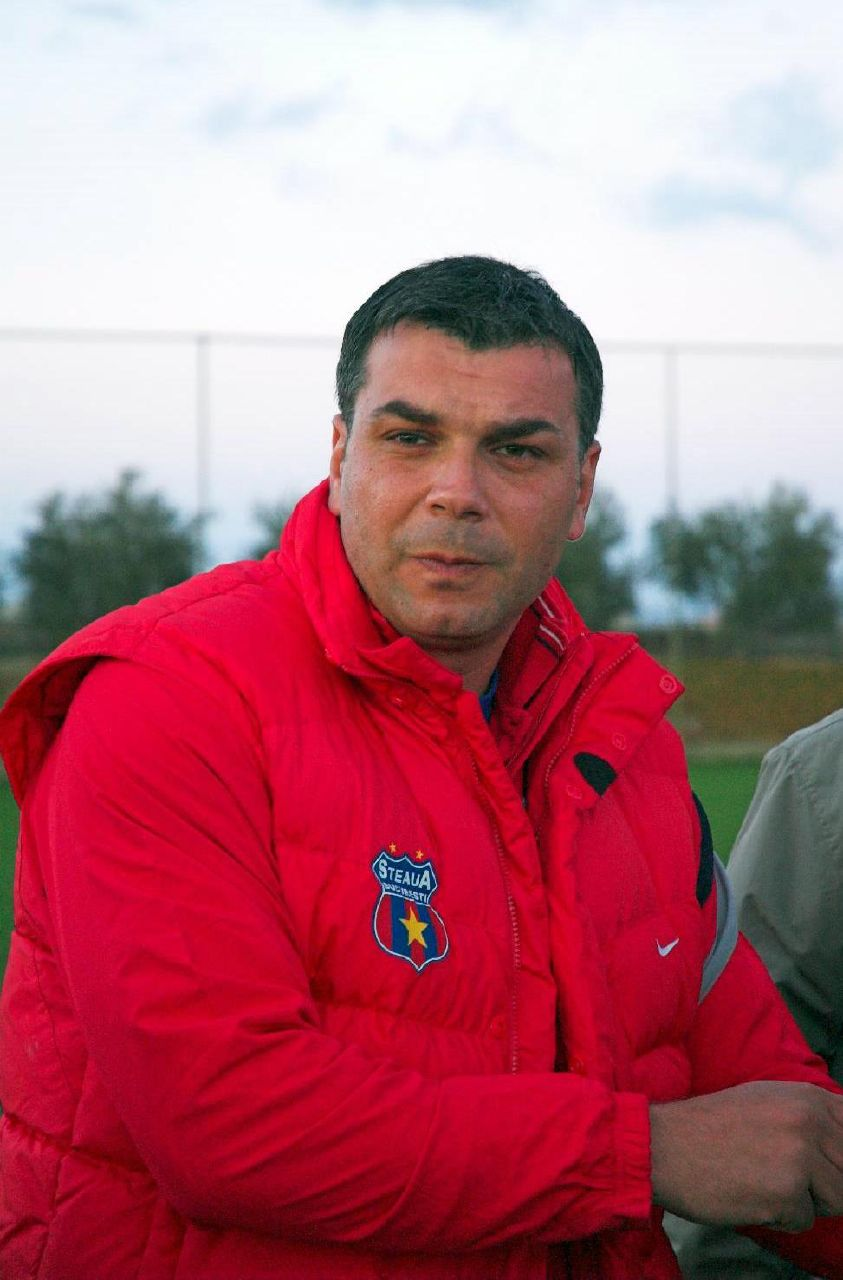
- Olăroiu in 2007

Personal information
- Full name: Cosmin Aurelian Olăroiu
- Date of birth: 10 June 1969 (age 57)
- Place of birth: Bucharest, Romania
- Height: 1.87 m (6 ft 2 in)
- Position: Centre-back

Team information
- Current team: Al Jazira (head coach)

Youth career
- –1988: Steaua București

Senior career*
Years	Team	Apps	(Gls)
1988–1989	Carpați Nehoiu		
1989–1990	Gloria Buzău		
1990–1991	MECON București		
1991–1992	Girueta București		
1992–1995	Naţional București	80	(8)
1995–1997	Universitatea Craiova	37	(2)
1997–2000	Suwon Samsung Bluewings	98	(7)
2000	→ JEF United Ichihara (loan)	10	(0)
Total		225	(17)

Managerial career
- 2001–2002: Naţional București
- 2002: Steaua București
- 2003–2004: Naţional București
- 2005: Politehnica Timişoara
- 2005–2007: Steaua București
- 2007–2009: Al-Hilal
- 2009–2010: Al-Sadd
- 2011–2013: Al Ain
- 2013–2017: Shabab Al-Ahli
- 2014–2015: Saudi Arabia
- 2018–2021: Jiangsu Suning
- 2021–2025: Sharjah
- 2025–2026: United Arab Emirates
- 2026–: Al Jazira
- * Club domestic league appearances and goals

Cosmin Aurelian Olăroiu (born 10 June 1969) is a Romanian professional football manager and former player, currently in charge of UAE Pro League club Al Jazira.

As a manager, he guided Steaua București to the Divizia A title and Romanian Supercup both in 2006, and led his side to the semi-finals of the UEFA Cup in the same year.

He is a manager in the Arabian Peninsula who has led Al Hilal, Al Sadd, Al Ain, and Al Ahli in Saudi Arabia, Qatar, and the United Arab Emirates to league trophies. In 2020, he guided Jiangsu Suning to a title in China.

In May 2025, he led Sharjah FC to their first continental title, winning the AFC Champions League Two.

== Club career ==
As a player, Olăroiu's best-known clubs he played for are Universitatea Craiova and Naţional București. However, he also played with success in K League for Suwon Samsung Bluewings where he helped the club to win two K League titles in 1998 and 1999. He also won the Korean League Cup and twice the Super Cup. He finished his playing career with JEF United Ichihara in 2000.

== Coaching career ==
=== Early years ===
He started his coaching career during the 2000–01 season at Naţional București, leading them to a respectable 7th place in his first season. During the following season, he guided the club to a second-place finish in the league, finishing above clubs such as Steaua and Rapid București.

In the summer 2002, Olăroiu signed for Steaua București. He resigned after only seven league games, blaming the decision on a lack of support from the board and players. The club president Viorel Păunescu re-appointed Victor Piţurcă, former manager before 2002 who wanted to return to head-coaching and was still highly regarded by the players.

After leaving Steaua București, Olăroiu returned to Național București, this time as a general manager. In 2003, he was named head coach again, replacing Walter Zenga.

In the winter of 2004, Olăroiu joined FCU Poli Timişoara and brought with him the best players from Național București. He led them to a near historical fourth-place finish in Divizia A, but in November 2005 he was sacked by the club's owner Marian Iancu.

=== Steaua Bucharest ===
Just some days after, Olăroiu was appointed manager by Gigi Becali, the new president, and this time owner, of Steaua București, to replace Oleh Protasov. His first championship title as coach came in June 2006 and then one month later, he led the club to the conquest of the Supercupa României. In May 2006, Olăroiu's side reached the semi-finals of the 2005–06 UEFA Cup. He also helped Steaua to qualify for the UEFA Champions League group stages, where they played against Dynamo Kyiv, Real Madrid and Olympique Lyon. Steaua secured a third place and a spot in the UEFA Cup knockout rounds.

=== Al-Hilal ===
In June 2007, Olăroiu signed for Al-Hilal. In 2008, he again proved his coaching worth, winning the Saudi Premier League and the Crown Prince Cup in his first season in charge. He led his side to a second Crown Prince Cup title before leaving the club in February 2009, while leading them to the first position in the league.

=== Al-Sadd ===
In April 2009, he signed a two-year contract with Al-Sadd. In December 2010, Olăroiu announced his resignation as club boss immediately after leading his side to the Qatari Stars Cup.

On 5 May 2011, Olăroiu was named supervisor for Steaua București for the last three matches of Liga I in the 2010–11 season and the 2011 Cupa României Final. Steaua's assistant coach, Gabriel Caramarin took charge of the team as caretaker manager, for the last remaining games.

=== Al Ain ===
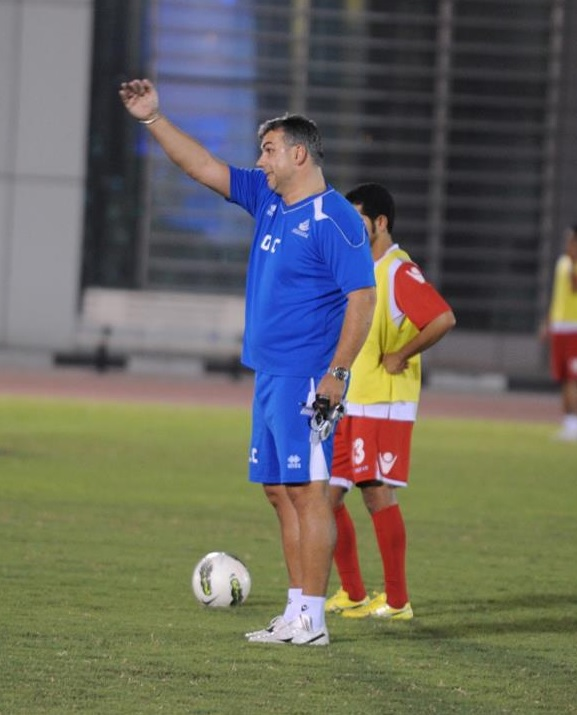
Olăroiu instructing his Al-Ain players during a training session in 2013.

In the summer of 2011, Cosmin Olăroiu was hired as Al Ain manager on a two-year contract. He steered the club away from the relegation zone, before leading them to the UAE Pro-League title in the 2011–12 season. On 18 September 2012, he also won the UAE Super Cup with Al Ain.

He then repeated the performance the following season, winning a consecutive title for Al Ain. In June 2013, Olăroiu signed a contract extension with Al Ain reportedly worth €4 million a season after penning new two-year deal. However, the contract was terminated on 1 July 2013.

=== Al Ahli ===
On 6 July 2013, it was announced that Olăroiu signed a three-year contract with Dubai side Al Ahli. On 30 August, Olăroiu won his first match in charge of Al Ahli against his former club Al Ain in the Super Cup final. In April 2014, Cosmin Olăroiu mathematically won his third consecutive league title as Al Ahli won over arch rivals Al Wasl 2–1. During his first season in charge, Olăroiu won three domestic titles and was awarded as Coach of the Year by the UAE Pro League in 2014.

He guided the club to their first AFC Champions League final in 2015, where they lost 1–0 on aggregate to China's Guangzhou Evergrande.

In the 2016–17 season, Olăroiu became one of the highest paid managers in world football, earning a sum of €6.5 million annually.

=== Saudi Arabia ===
On 15 December 2014, it was announced that he will train the Saudi Arabia national football team for 2015 AFC Asian Cup as temporary coach. His first match in charge was a 4–1 loss to Bahrain in a friendly match. Olăroiu's side also lost two next matches, including a 1–0 loss to China in 2015 AFC Asian Cup in Saudi Arabia's first match at the tournament. They won their next match 4–1 against North Korea but lost 3–1 their final match against Uzbekistan and were eliminated in the group stages. The results is a consequence of his not knowing his players well, having only been appointed in a hurriedly temporary agreement. At the end of the tournament, Olăroiu returned to his club position.

Results	Date	Venue	Opponent	Result	Goalscorers	Competition
2014
1	30 December 2014	Geelong, Australia	Bahrain	1–4	Naif Hazazi	Friendly
2015
2	4 January 2015	Sydney, Australia	South Korea	0–2		Friendly
3	10 January 2015	Brisbane, Australia	China	0–1		2015 AFC Asian Cup
4	14 January 2015	Melbourne, Australia	North Korea	4–1	Naif Hazazi, Mohammad Al-Sahlawi x2 & Nawaf Al Abed	2015 AFC Asian Cup
5	18 January 2015	Melbourne, Australia	Uzbekistan	1–3	Mohammad Al-Sahlawi (P)	2015 AFC Asian Cup

=== Jiangsu Suning ===
On 28 March 2018, Olăroiu was appointed at Jiangsu Suning in the Chinese Super League, replacing Fabio Capello. He took charge of his first match on 1 April in a home game against Tianjin Teda, which Jiangsu won 2–1.

In his third season, Jiangsu Suning won the Super League title for the first time in the club's history. However, the club folded before the start of the 2021 season.

=== Sharjah ===
On 10 November 2021, Olăroiu returned to the United Arab Emirates to help an out of form Sharjah stay competitive in the UAE Pro League. On 18 May 2025, Olăroiu won the inaugural AFC Champions League Two with the club, the successor to the former AFC Cup. He became the fourth Romanian coach after Costică Ștefănescu, Valeriu Tița and Marin Ion, to win the competition.

=== United Arab Emirates ===
On 18 April 2025, Olăroiu was appointed as the new head coach of United Arab Emirates national team replacing Paulo Bento.

== Managerial statistics ==
As of 8 November 2026

Team	From	To	Record							
Team	From	To	G	W	D	L	GF	GA	GD	Win %
Național București	1 January 2001	30 June 2002	46	24	12	10	64	37	+27	52.17
Steaua București	1 July 2002	15 October 2002	7	2	3	2	6	5	+1	28.57
Național București	10 September 2003	31 December 2004	47	22	9	16	74	53	+21	46.81
Politehnica Timişoara	1 January 2005	7 November 2005	29	16	8	5	44	18	+26	55.17
Steaua București	16 December 2005	30 June 2007	73	40	18	15	110	57	+53	54.79
Al Hilal	1 July 2007	28 February 2009	56	37	14	5	93	30	+63	66.07
Al Sadd	18 April 2009	24 December 2010	59	33	15	11	142	64	+78	55.93
Al Ain	7 June 2011	6 July 2013	60	43	7	10	144	57	+87	71.67
Shabab Al Ahli	7 July 2013	2 December 2017	179	99	53	27	324	171	+153	55.31
Saudi Arabia	15 December 2014	31 January 2015	4	1	0	3	6	9	−3	25.00
Jiangsu Suning	28 March 2018	10 February 2021	83	39	28	16	145	92	+53	46.99
Sharjah	10 November 2021	25 May 2025	161	81	44	36	269	171	+98	50.31
United Arab Emirates	18 April 2025	30 May 2026	13	4	5	4	16	16	+0	30.77
Al Jazira	13 June 2026	present	16	11	4	1	29	12	+17	68.75
Total			834	452	220	162	1,444	792	+652	54.20

== Honours ==
=== Player ===
Suwon Samsung Bluewings

- K League: 1998, 1999
- Korean League Cup: 1999, 2000
- Korean Super Cup: 1999, 2000
- Daehan Fire Insurance Cup: 1999
- Asian Cup Winners' Cup runner-up: 1997–98

=== Manager ===
Steaua București

- Divizia A: 2005–06
- Supercupa României: 2006

Al Hilal

- Saudi Pro League: 2007–08
- Saudi Crown Prince Cup: 2007–08, 2008–09

Al Sadd

- Qatari Stars Cup: 2010

Al Ain

- UAE Pro League: 2011–12, 2012–13
- UAE Super Cup: 2012

Shabab Al Ahli

- UAE Pro League: 2013–14, 2015–16
- UAE President's Cup runner-up: 2013–14, 2014–15
- UAE League Cup: 2013–14, 2016–17
- UAE Super Cup: 2013, 2014, 2016
- AFC Champions League runner-up: 2015

Jiangsu Suning

- Chinese Super League: 2020
- Chinese FA Cup runner-up: 2020

Sharjah

- UAE President's Cup: 2021–22, 2022–23
- UAE League Cup: 2022–23
- UAE Super Cup: 2022
- AFC Champions League Two: 2024–25

=== Individual ===
- Gazeta Sporturilor Romania Coach of the Year: 2006, 2020 (joint with Răzvan Lucescu)
- AGL Coach of the Year: 2014, 2016, 2017
- Ahdaaf Middle East Coach of the Year: 2015
