= Lee Ki-hyung =

South Korean footballer and coach

Personal information
- Full name: Lee Ki-hyung
- Date of birth: 28 September 1974 (age 52)
- Place of birth: Hwasun, Jeonnam, South Korea
- Height: 1.82 m (6 ft 0 in)
- Position: Right-back

Team information
- Current team: Yanbian Longding (manager)

College career
Years	Team	Apps	(Gls)
1992–1995	Korea University		

Senior career*
Years	Team	Apps	(Gls)
1996–2002	Suwon Samsung Bluewings	110	(12)
2003–2004	Seongnam Ilhwa Chunma	54	(5)
2005–2006	Seoul	17	(0)
2007–2010	Auckland City	53	(9)
Total		234	(26)

International career
1990	South Korea U17	1	(0)
1992–1993	South Korea U20	2	(2)
1993–1996	South Korea U23	48 (Note: Includes nine appearances and three goals against non-national teams, and one appearance against another KFA team.)	(10)
1995–2003	South Korea	47	(6)

Managerial career
- 2017–2018: Incheon United
- 2020: Busan IPark (caretaker)
- 2022–2024: Seongnam
- 2024–: Yanbian Longding
Medal record
Representing South Korea
Men's football
AFC Youth Championship
Runner-up	1992 United Arab Emirates
- * Club domestic league appearances and goals

- Lee Ki-hyung
- Hangul: 이기형
- Hanja: 李基珩
- RR: I Gihyeong
- MR: I Kihyŏng

Lee Ki-hyung (born 28 September 1974) is a South Korean professional football manager and former player who is the current manager of Yanbian Longding.

== International career ==
Nicknamed the "Cannon shooter", Lee was a full-back who showed the strongest shot in South Korea. He played for South Korea in the 1996 Summer Olympics and the 1996 AFC Asian Cup. He also participated in qualifiers of the 1998 FIFA World Cup, but failed to be selected for the World Cup team by manager Cha Bum-kun.

== Career statistics ==
=== Club ===
Appearances and goals by club, season and competition
Club	Season	League			National cup		League cup		Continental		Total	
Club	Season	Division	Apps	Goals	Apps	Goals	Apps	Goals	Apps	Goals	Apps	Goals
Suwon Samsung Bluewings	1996	K League	16	3	?	?	6	0	—		22	3
Suwon Samsung Bluewings	1997	K League	6	1	?	?	9	0	? (Note: Appearance(s) in Asian Cup Winners' Cup)	?	15	1
Suwon Samsung Bluewings	1998	K League	14	1	?	?	10	3	?	?	24	4
Suwon Samsung Bluewings	1999	K League	24	2	?	?	12	1	? (Note: Appearance(s) in Asian Club Championship/AFC Champions League)	?	36	3
Suwon Samsung Bluewings	2000	K League	3	0	?	?	0	0	?	?	3	0
Suwon Samsung Bluewings	2001	K League	27	1	?	?	0	0	?	?	27	1
Suwon Samsung Bluewings	2002	K League	20	4	?	?	9	2	?	?	29	6
Suwon Samsung Bluewings	Total		110	12	?	?	46	6	?	?	156	18
Seongnam Ilhwa Chunma	2003	K League	38	3	2	0	—		?	?	40	3
Seongnam Ilhwa Chunma	2004	K League	16	2	1	0	11	0	?	?	28	2
Seongnam Ilhwa Chunma	Total		54	5	3	0	11	0	?	?	68	5
FC Seoul	2005	K League	9	0	2	0	7	0	—		18	0
FC Seoul	2006	K League	8	0	2	0	9	0	—		19	0
FC Seoul	Total		17	0	4	0	16	0	—		37	0
Auckland City	2007–08	New Zealand Championship	22	5	—		—		? (Note: Appearance(s) in OFC Champions League)	?	22	5
Auckland City	2008–09	New Zealand Championship	17	0	—		—		?	?	17	0
Auckland City	2009–10	New Zealand Championship	14	4	—		—		?	?	14	4
Auckland City	Total		53	9	—		—		?	?	53	9
Career total			234	26	7	0	73	6	?	?	314	32

=== International ===
Results list South Korea's goal tally first.

List of international goals scored by Lee Ki-hyung
No.	Date	Venue	Opponent	Score	Result	Competition
1	26 February 1995	Hong Kong	Japan	1–1	2–2 (5–3 p)	1995 Dynasty Cup
2	26 February 1995	Hong Kong	Japan	2–2	2–2 (5–3 p)	1995 Dynasty Cup
3	25 September 1996	Seoul, South Korea	China	2–1	3–1	Friendly
4	25 September 2003	Incheon, South Korea	Vietnam	1–0	5–0	2004 AFC Asian Cup qualification
5	24 October 2003	Muscat, Oman	Nepal	2–0	7–0	2004 AFC Asian Cup qualification
6	24 October 2003	Muscat, Oman	Nepal	7–0	7–0	2004 AFC Asian Cup qualification

== Honours ==
Suwon Samsung Bluewings

- K League 1: 1998, 1999
- Korean FA Cup: 2002
- Korean League Cup: 1999, 1999+, 2000, 2001
- Korean Super Cup: 1999, 2000
- Asian Club Championship: 2000–01, 2001–02
- Asian Super Cup: 2001, 2002

Seongnam Ilhwa Chunma

- K League 1: 2003
- Korean League Cup: 2004
- AFC Champions League runner-up: 2004

FC Seoul

- Korean League Cup: 2006

Auckland City

- New Zealand Football Championship: 2008–09

South Korea U20

- AFC Youth Championship runner-up: 1992

Individual

- K League All-Star: 1997, 1998, 1999, 2002, 2003, 2004
