= Lee Jin-haeng =

South Korean footballer

Lee Jin-Haeng 이진행
Personal information
- Full name: Lee Jin-Haeng
- Date of birth: 10 July 1971 (age 55)
- Place of birth: South Korea
- Height: 1.74 m (5 ft 8 1/2 in)
- Position: Attacking midfielder

Team information
- Current team: Busan IPark

Youth career
- 1990–1993: Yonsei University

Senior career*
Years	Team	Apps	(Gls)
1994–1995	Housing & Commercial Bank		
1996–2000	Suwon Samsung Bluewings	84	(11)

International career^{‡}
1992	South Korea U-23		

Managerial career
- 2001–2010: Suwon Technical High School
- 2010: Suwon Samsung Bluewings (Scouter)
- 2011–2012: Suwon Samsung Bluewings (Reserve)
- 2013–: Busan IPark (Coach)
- * Club domestic league appearances and goals as of 16 December 2012 ‡ National team caps and goals as of 16 December 2012

Lee Jin-Haeng (Korean: 이진행; born 10 July 1971) is a South Korean footballer.

== Honours ==
=== Club ===
Suwon Samsung Bluewings

- K-League (2): 1998, 1999
- K-League Cup (3): 1999, 1999S, 2000
- Super Cup (2): 1999, 2000

=== Individual ===
- K-League Best XI (1): 1997
