= Park Sung-bae =

South Korean football player (born 1975)

Park Sung-Bae 박성배
Personal information
- Full name: Park Sung-Bae
- Date of birth: 28 November 1975 (age 50)
- Place of birth: Chungbuk, South Korea
- Height: 1.81 m (5 ft 11 in)
- Position: Striker

Youth career
- 1994–1997: Soongsil University

Senior career*
Years	Team	Apps	(Gls)
1998–2004	Jeonbuk Hyundai Motors	93	(26)
2003–2004	→ Gwangju Sangmu (military service)	46	(4)
2005–2006	FC Seoul	0	(0)
2005	→ Busan IPark (loan)	20	(5)
2007	Suwon Samsung Bluewings	13	(2)
2008–2009	YoungHeart Manawatu	6	(1)
2009	Eastern Suburbs AFC		
2010	Yongin City FC	17	(3)

International career
1999–2001	South Korea	8	(0)
- * Club domestic league appearances and goals

- Park Sung-bae
- Hangul: 박성배
- Hanja: 朴成培
- RR: Bak Seongbae
- MR: Pak Sŏngbae

Park Sung-Bae is a South Korean football player.

He played for several clubs, including Jeonbuk Hyundai Motors, Gwangju Sangmu Bulsajo (army), FC Seoul, Busan I'Park and Suwon Samsung Bluewings. Also, he played for the South Korea national football team in 1999–2001.

== Club career statistics ==
Club performance			League		Cup		League Cup		Continental		Total	
Season	Club	League	Apps	Goals	Apps	Goals	Apps	Goals	Apps	Goals	Apps	Goals
South Korea			League		KFA Cup		League Cup		Asia		Total	
1998	Jeonbuk Hyundai Motors	K-League	17	10	?	?	15	2	—			
1999	Jeonbuk Hyundai Motors	K-League	21	5	?	?	9	6	—			
2000	Jeonbuk Hyundai Motors	K-League	23	8	?	?	9	3	—			
2001	Jeonbuk Hyundai Motors	K-League	15	2	?	?	8	1	?	?		
2002	Jeonbuk Hyundai Motors	K-League	17	1	?	?	8	3	?	?		
2003	Gwangju Sangmu Bulsajo	K-League	26	2	0	0	0	0	—		26	2
2004	Gwangju Sangmu Bulsajo	K-League	20	2	0	0	11	1	—		31	3
2005	Busan IPark	K-League	20	5	1	0	5	2	?	?		
2006	FC Seoul	K-League	0	0	0	0	0	0	—		0	0
2007	Suwon Bluewings	K-League	13	2	0	0	6	0	—		19	2
New Zealand			League		Chatham Cup		League Cup		Oceania		Total	
2008-09	YoungHeart Manawatu	NZFC	6	1								
2009	Eastern Suburbs	Northern League										
South Korea			League		KFA Cup		League Cup		Asia		Total	
2010	Yongin City FC	Korea National League	17	3	0	0	—		—			
Total	South Korea		189	40	1	0	71	18			261	58
Total	New Zealand		6	1							6	1
Career total			195	41	1	0	71	18			267	59
