= Choi Jin-cheul =

South Korean footballer (born 1971)

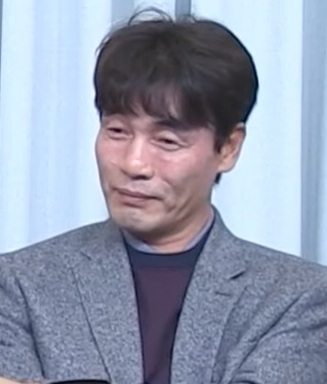
- Choi in 2022

Personal information
- Date of birth: 26 March 1971 (age 55)
- Place of birth: Jindo, Jeonnam, South Korea
- Height: 1.87 m (6 ft 2 in)
- Position: Centre-back

College career
Years	Team	Apps	(Gls)
1990–1993	Soongsil University		

Senior career*
Years	Team	Apps	(Gls)
1994–1995	Sangmu FC (draft)		
1996–2007	Jeonbuk Hyundai Motors	241	(18)

International career
2002	South Korea U23	1 (Note: Appearance as an overage player in a friendly)	(0)
1993	South Korea B		
1997–2006	South Korea	65	(4)

Managerial career
- 2014–2015: South Korea U17
- 2016: Pohang Steelers
Medal record
Men's football
Representing South Korea
EAFF Championship
Gold medal – first place	2003 Japan	Team
East Asian Games
Gold medal – first place	1993 Shanghai	Team
- * Club domestic league appearances and goals

- Choi Jin-cheul
- Hangul: 최진철
- Hanja: 崔眞喆
- RR: Choe Jincheol
- MR: Ch'oe Chinch'ŏl

Choi Jin-cheul (born 26 March 1971) is a South Korean football manager and former player.

== Club career ==
Choi played only for K League club Jeonbuk Hyundai Motors during his professional career. He played 312 games for Jeonbuk in the K League (including Korean League Cup). He was a well-built centre-back and was strong on aerial duels and tussles.

A forward during his school days, Choi played as a striker while Jeonbuk striker Kim Do-hoon was on loan to J.League club Vissel Kobe for two years in 1998 and 1999. He had 17 goals and 8 assists including a hat-trick during that time.

After winning an AFC Champions League title in 2006, Choi was named the Most Valuable Player of the tournament.

== International career ==
Choi was an influential centre-back in South Korea national team. He made 65 appearances for the national team including matches in 2002 and 2006 FIFA World Cup. He formed a strong defense with Hong Myung-bo and Kim Tae-young during the 2002 World Cup.

== Personal life ==
In November 2021, Choi signed with DH Entertainment.

== Career statistics ==
=== Club ===
Appearances and goals by club, season and competition
Club	Season	League			National cup		League cup		Continental		Other		Total	
Club	Season	Division	Apps	Goals	Apps	Goals	Apps	Goals	Apps	Goals	Apps	Goals	Apps	Goals
Sangmu FC (draft)	1994	National Semipro League							—		—			
Sangmu FC (draft)	1995	National Semipro League							—		—			
Sangmu FC (draft)	Total								—		—			
Jeonbuk Hyundai Motors	1996	K League	27	0			2	1	—		—		29	1
Jeonbuk Hyundai Motors	1997	K League	9	0			12	2	—		—		21	2
Jeonbuk Hyundai Motors	1998	K League	11	6			16	2	—		—		27	8
Jeonbuk Hyundai Motors	1999	K League	26	7			9	2	—		—		35	9
Jeonbuk Hyundai Motors	2000	K League	25	2			7	1	—		—		32	3
Jeonbuk Hyundai Motors	2001	K League	21	0			4	0			1 (Note: Appearance in Korean Super Cup)	1	26	1
Jeonbuk Hyundai Motors	2002	K League	23	0			1	0			—		24	0
Jeonbuk Hyundai Motors	2003	K League	33	1	4	0	—		—		—		37	1
Jeonbuk Hyundai Motors	2004	K League	17	1	2	0	4	1			1	0	24	2
Jeonbuk Hyundai Motors	2005	K League	19	0	2	0	11	1	—		—		32	1
Jeonbuk Hyundai Motors	2006	K League	16	1	0	0	4	0	10	1	3 (Note: Two appearances in FIFA Club World Cup, one appearance in Korean Super Cup)	0	33	2
Jeonbuk Hyundai Motors	2007	K League	14	0	1	0	1	0	2	1	—		18	1
Jeonbuk Hyundai Motors	Total		241	18	9	0	71	10	12	2	5	1	338	31
Career total			241	18	9	0	71	10	12	2	5	1	338	31

=== International ===
Appearances and goals by national team and year
National team	Year	Apps	Goals
South Korea	1997	1	0
South Korea	2001	4	0
South Korea	2002	20	1
South Korea	2003	8	0
South Korea	2004	15	2
South Korea	2005	3	1
South Korea	2006	14	0
Career total		65	4

Results list South Korea's goal tally first.

List of international goals scored by Choi Jin-cheul
No.	Date	Venue	Opponent	Score	Result	Competition
1	30 January 2002	Pasadena, United States	Costa Rica	1–2	1–3	2002 CONCACAF Gold Cup
2	10 July 2004	Gwangju, South Korea	Bahrain	2–0	2–0	Friendly
3	13 October 2004	Beirut, Lebanon	Lebanon	1–0	1–1	2006 FIFA World Cup Qualification
4	16 November 2005	Seoul, South Korea	Serbia and Montenegro	1–0	2–0	Friendly

== Filmography ==
=== Television ===
Year	Title	Role	Note(s)	Ref.
2018	God of Football with Hiddink	Himself		
2021–present	Kick a Goal	Himself		
2022	Gundesliga	Himself		

== Honours ==
=== Player ===
Sangmu FC

- Korean National Semipro League (Spring): 1994

Jeonbuk Hyundai Motors

- Korean FA Cup: 2000, 2003, 2005
- Korean Super Cup: 2004
- AFC Champions League: 2006
- Asian Cup Winners' Cup runner-up: 2001–02

South Korea B

- East Asian Games: 1993

South Korea

- EAFF Championship: 2003

Individual

- K League All-Star: 2002, 2003, 2004, 2005, 2006, 2007
- K League 1 Best XI: 2002, 2003, 2006
- AFC Champions League Most Valuable Player: 2006

=== Television personality ===
List of awards and nominations received by TV personality Choi Jin-cheul
Award ceremony	Year	Category	Nominated work	Result	Ref.
SBS Entertainment Awards	2022	Leader of the Year Award (Note: Shared with Ha Seok-ju, Kim Byung-ji, Kim Tae-young, Choi Sung-yong, Lee Eul-yong, Hyun Young-min, Lee Young-pyo, Oh Beom-seok, Cho Jae-jin and Baek Ji-hoon)	Kick a Goal	Won	
