= Paulinho (footballer, born 1977) =

Brazilian footballer

Personal information
- Full name: Marcos Paulo Paulini
- Date of birth: 4 March 1977 (age 49)
- Place of birth: Francisco Alves, Brazil
- Position: Forward

Youth career
- –1995: Internacional

Senior career*
Years	Team	Apps	(Gls)
1995–2000	Joinville		
2001–2003	Ulsan Hyundai Horang-i		
2004	Criciúma		
2005–2006	Santa Cruz		
2006	Joinville		
- * Club domestic league appearances and goals as of 12 April 2024

Marcos Paulo Paulini (born 4 March 1977), better known as Paulinho, is a Brazilian former professional footballer who played as a forward.

== Career ==
Fourth top scorer in Joinville's history with 74 goals, Paulinho was the highlight in winning the 2000 Catarinense Championship title. In 2001 he transferred to Ulsan Hyundai of the K-League where he played until 2003. He also played for Criciúma and Santa Cruz before retiring at Joinville in 2006.. Paulinho was elected in the ideal XI of the first 35 years of Joinville EC's history.

== Honours ==
Joinville

- Campeonato Catarinense: 2000
