= Chung Sang-nam =

South Korean footballer and manager

Chung Sang-nam 정상남
Personal information
- Full name: Chung Sang-nam
- Date of birth: September 7, 1975 (age 51)
- Height: 1.88 m (6 ft 2 in)
- Position: Forward

Youth career
- Yonsei University

Senior career*
Years	Team	Apps	(Gls)
1998–2000	Pohang Steelers	4	(0)
2001	Suwon Samsung Bluewings	0	(0)
Total		127	(3)

International career
1994	South Korea U-20	?	(?)
1995–1996	South Korea U-23	3	(0)

Managerial career
- 2013–2014: FC Seoul U-15 team (coach)
- 2015: FC Seoul U-15 team
- 2016: FC Seoul Reserve tema (coach)
- 2016–: FC Seoul (coach)
- * Club domestic league appearances and goals as of 30 April 2010

Chung Sang-nam (born 1969) is a South Korean football manager and former footballer. He played for the Pohang Steelers, and represented South Korea at the 1996 Summer Olympics.

In 2015, he was appointed as manager of FC Seoul U-15 team
