= 1999 Korean League Cup =

1999 Adidas Cup
Tournament details
- Country: South Korea
- Dates: 4–11 August 1999
- Teams: 10

Final positions
- Champions: Suwon Samsung Bluewings (2nd title)
- Runners-up: Anyang LG Cheetahs

Tournament statistics
- Matches played: 9
- Goals scored: 27 (3 per match)
- Attendance: 130,418 (14,491 per match)
- Top goal scorer: Denis Laktionov (3 goals)

The Adidas Cup 1999 was the twelfth competition of the Korean League Cup, and one of two Korean League Cups held in 1999. All matches were played without extra time.

== Bracket ==
First round
Jeonbuk Hyundai Dinos	2 (2)
Anyang LG Cheetahs (p)	2 (4)
Busan Daewoo Royals	1
Pohang Steelers	2

Quarter-finals
Cheonan Ilhwa Chunma	0
Anyang LG Cheetahs	1
Jeonnam Dragons	1
Daejeon Citizen	0
Bucheon SK	0
Suwon Samsung Bluewings	4
Pohang Steelers (p)	1 (4)
Ulsan Hyundai Horang-i	1 (1)

Semi-finals
Anyang LG Cheetahs	1
Jeonnam Dragons	0
Suwon Samsung Bluewings	3
Pohang Steelers	2

Final
Suwon Samsung Bluewings	4
Anyang LG Cheetahs	2

== Matches ==
=== First round ===
August 4
17:00 UTC+9

Jeonbuk Hyundai Dinos	2–2	Anyang LG Cheetahs
Seo Hyuk-su 29'; Park Seong-bae 73'		Choi Yong-soo 35'; Kim Seong-jae 46'
Penalties
	2–4

Dongdaemun Stadium
Attendance: 15,248

August 4
19:00 UTC+9

Busan Daewoo Royals	1–2	Pohang Steelers
Ahn Jung-hwan 81'		Park Tae-ha 45'; Lee Dong-gook 55'

Dongdaemun Stadium
Attendance: 15,248

=== Quarter-finals ===
August 5
17:00 UTC+9

Bucheon SK	0–4	Suwon Samsung Bluewings
		Lee Jin-haeng 29'; Laktionov 32'; Cho Hyun-doo 34'; Parakhnevych 75'

Dongdaemun Stadium
Attendance: 8,912

August 5
19:00 UTC+9

Jeonnam Dragons	1–0	Daejeon Citizen
Han Jung-kook 81'

Dongdaemun Stadium
Attendance: 8,912

August 6
17:00 UTC+9

Pohang Steelers	1–1	Ulsan Hyundai Horang-i
Park Tae-ha 45'		Son Jeong-tak 65'
Penalties
	4–1

Dongdaemun Stadium
Attendance: 7,854

August 6
19:00 UTC+9

Cheonan Ilhwa Chunma	0–1	Anyang LG Cheetahs
		Choi Yong-soo 33' (pen.)

Dongdaemun Stadium
Attendance: 7,854

=== Semi-finals ===
August 8
17:00 UTC+9

Anyang LG Cheetahs	1–0	Jeonnam Dragons
Jin Soon-jin 81'

Dongdaemun Stadium
Attendance: 20,758

August 8
19:00 UTC+9

Suwon Samsung Bluewings	3–2	Pohang Steelers
Parakhnevych 33'; Laktionov 75' (pen.), 79' (pen.)		Kim Jong-chun 43'; Kim Se-in 73'

Dongdaemun Stadium
Attendance: 20,758

=== Final ===
August 11
19:00 UTC+9

Suwon Samsung Bluewings	4–2	Anyang LG Cheetahs
Drakulić 27', 90'; Shin Hong-gi 45' (pen.); Ko Jong-soo 49'		Jung Kwang-min 27', 40'

Dongdaemun Stadium
Attendance: 24,874

== Awards ==
Award	Player	Team	Points
Top goalscorer	(Russia) Denis Laktionov	Suwon Samsung Bluewings	3 goals
Top assist provider	(Russia) Denis Laktionov	Suwon Samsung Bluewings	3 assists

== See also ==
- 1999 in South Korean football
- 1999 Korean League Cup (Supplementary Cup)
- 1999 K League
- 1999 Korean FA Cup
