= World Series of Soccer (MLS) =

Men's football tournament

The World Series of Soccer, also known in Spanish as Serie Mundial de Fútbol, was an international men's association football competition hosted by Major League Soccer from 2005 to 2007. It was used by MLS to provide its teams with opportunities to compete against top international teams.

The term, World Series of Soccer, was originally used for a series of senior international soccer matches hosted by the United States Soccer Federation between 1991 and 1994. In 2005, Major League Soccer re-introduced the name for a series of professional matches in the United States.

== History ==
In 2005, Major League Soccer (MLS) began the World Series of Soccer (WSS), a series of games pitting MLS and big name international clubs against each other. The games took place across the United States. The WSS was a round robin style competition between two MLS teams, D.C. United and Chicago Fire, as well as two European powerhouses, Chelsea of the English Premier League and AC Milan of Italy's Serie A. The games were played during the MLS season, which was also the European off-season.

In 2006, MLS continued the WSS and expanded it to include Real Madrid and Barcelona from Spain, Celtic from Scotland, Everton from England, and Club América, Necaxa, and Tigres UANL from Mexico.

The World Series of Soccer returned in 2007 as a four-team affair, primarily used to promote the arrival of English footballer David Beckham to the United States. His team LA Galaxy had a round-robin with Chelsea of the Premier League, the Suwon Samsung Bluewings of the K League, and Tigres UANL of the Liga MX. Tigres won the competition by virtue of goal difference over Chelsea.

== Results ==
Champions are in bold.

=== 2005 ===
Date	Team 1	Score	Team 2	Ref.
24 July	AC Milan	0–1	**Chelsea**	
27 July	Chicago Fire	1–3	**AC Milan**	
28 July	D.C. United	1–2	**Chelsea**	
31 July	AC Milan	1–1	Chelsea	

=== 2006 ===
Date	Team 1	Score	Team 2	Ref.
12 July	**D.C. United**	4–0	Celtic	
12 July	Chicago Fire	1–2	**Club América**	
12 July	LA Galaxy	0–1	**Necaxa**	
19 July	New England Revolution	1–1	Celtic	
19 July	**FC Dallas**	2–0	Tigres UANL	
23 July	**Chivas USA**	1–1 (5–4 p)	Club América	
26 July	Columbus Crew	1–1	Everton	
9 August	D.C. United	1–1	Real Madrid	
12 August	New York Red Bulls	1–4	**Barcelona**	
12 August	Real Salt Lake	0–2	**Real Madrid**	

=== 2007 ===
Date	Team 1	Score	Team 2	Ref.
17 July	Suwon Samsung Bluewings	0–1	**Chelsea**	
17 July	**Tigres UANL**	3–0	LA Galaxy	
21 July	**Tigres UANL**	3–0	Suwon Samsung Bluewings	
21 July	**Chelsea**	1–0	LA Galaxy	
