= Shin Hong-gi =

South Korean footballer (born 1968)

Personal information
- Date of birth: 4 May 1968 (age 58)
- Place of birth: Masan, Gyeongnam, South Korea
- Height: 1.73 m (5 ft 8 in)
- Position: Left-back

College career
Years	Team	Apps	(Gls)
1987–1990	Hanyang University		

Senior career*
Years	Team	Apps	(Gls)
1991–1997	Ulsan Hyundai Horang-i	167	(18)
1998–2001	Suwon Samsung Bluewings	96	(10)
Total		263	(28)

International career
1992–1999	South Korea	48	(3)

Managerial career
- 2013–2014: Jeonbuk Hyundai Motors (assistant)
- 2023–2024: Busan Transportation Corporation
- 2025: Lanzhou Longyuan Athletic
- * Club domestic league appearances and goals

Shin Hong-gi (born 4 May 1968; Korean: 신홍기) is a South Korean football manager and former player. He played as a left-back for Ulsan Hyundai Horang-i and Suwon Samsung Bluewings. He was also selected for the South Korea national team for the 1994 FIFA World Cup, playing three group stage matches.

== Career statistics ==
=== Club ===
Appearances and goals by club, season and competition
Club	Season	League			National cup		League cup		Continental		Total	
Club	Season	Division	Apps	Goals	Apps	Goals	Apps	Goals	Apps	Goals	Apps	Goals
Ulsan Hyundai Horang-i	1991	K League	39	1	—		—		—		39	1
Ulsan Hyundai Horang-i	1992	K League	30	7	—		9	1	—		39	8
Ulsan Hyundai Horang-i	1993	K League	10	1	—		2	1	—		12	2
Ulsan Hyundai Horang-i	1994	K League	20	1	—		0	0	—		20	1
Ulsan Hyundai Horang-i	1995	K League	27	4	—		7	0	—		34	4
Ulsan Hyundai Horang-i	1996	K League	25	4	?	?	5	0	?	?	30	4
Ulsan Hyundai Horang-i	1997	K League	16	0	?	?	14	2	?	?	30	2
Ulsan Hyundai Horang-i	Total		167	18	?	?	37	4	?	?	204	22
Suwon Samsung Bluewings	1998	K League	20	4	?	?	6	1	?	?	26	5
Suwon Samsung Bluewings	1999	K League	27	1	?	?	12	2	?	?	39	3
Suwon Samsung Bluewings	2000	K League	27	4	?	?	10	0	?	?	37	4
Suwon Samsung Bluewings	2001	K League	22	1	?	?	8	0	?	?	30	1
Suwon Samsung Bluewings	Total		96	10	?	?	36	3	?	?	132	13
Career total			263	28	?	?	73	7	?	?	336	35

=== International ===
Results list South Korea's goal tally first.

List of international goals scored by Shin Hong-gi
No.	Date	Venue	Opponent	Score	Result	Competition
1	22 October 1993	Doha, Qatar	Saudi Arabia	1–0	1–1	1994 FIFA World Cup qualification
2	16 February 1994	Changwon, South Korea	Romania	1–0	1–2	Friendly
3	26 November 1996	Guangzhou, China	China	3–1	3–2	Friendly

== Honours ==
Ulsan Hyundai Horang-i

- K League 1: 1996
- Korean League Cup: 1995

Suwon Samsung Bluewings

- K League 1: 1998, 1999
- Korean League Cup: 1999, 1999+, 2000, 2001
- Korean Super Cup: 1999, 2000
- Asian Club Championship: 2000–01, 2001–02
- Asian Super Cup: 2001

Individual

- K League All-Star: 1991, 1992, 1999, 2000
- K League 1 Best XI: 1992, 1999
- AFC Asian All-Star: 1993
- K League '90s All-Star Team: 2003

Sporting positions
Preceded by Jung Sung-hoon	Suwon Samsung Bluewings captain 1999-2000	Succeeded by Park Kun-ha
