= 2002 K League =

Samsung PAVV K League
- Season: 2002
- Dates: 7 July – 17 November 2002
- Champions: Seongnam Ilhwa Chunma (5th title)
- Matches played: 135
- Goals scored: 331 (2.45 per match)
- Best Player: Kim Dae-eui
- Top goalscorer: Edmilson (14 goals)

The 2002 K League was the 20th season of the K League. South Korea postponed its football league until July to prepare the 2002 FIFA World Cup, which was hosted by it.

== League table ==
Pos	Team	Pld	W	D	L	GF	GA	GD	Pts
1	Seongnam Ilhwa Chunma (C)	27	14	7	6	43	32	+11	49
2	Ulsan Hyundai Horang-i	27	13	8	6	37	27	+10	47
3	Suwon Samsung Bluewings	27	12	9	6	40	26	+14	45
4	Anyang LG Cheetahs	27	11	7	9	37	30	+7	40
5	Jeonnam Dragons	27	9	10	8	21	21	0	37
6	Pohang Steelers	27	9	9	9	31	34	−3	36
7	Jeonbuk Hyundai Motors	27	8	11	8	37	36	+1	35
8	Bucheon SK	27	8	8	11	32	40	−8	32
9	Busan I'Cons	27	6	8	13	36	45	−9	26
10	Daejeon Citizen	27	1	11	15	17	40	−23	14

Source: RSSSF
(C) Champions

== Top scorers ==
Rank	Player	Club	Goals	Apps
1	(Portugal) Edmilson	Jeonbuk Hyundai Motors	14	27
2	(South Korea) Woo Sung-yong	Busan I'Cons	13	25
3	(South Korea) Yoo Sang-chul	Ulsan Hyundai Horang-i	9	8
3	(Brazil) Tuta	Anyang LG Cheetahs	9	18
3	(Mali) Cheick Oumar Dabo	Bucheon SK	9	23
3	(North Macedonia) Goran Petreski	Pohang Steelers	9	23
3	(Federal Republic of Yugoslavia) Saša Drakulić	Seongnam Ilhwa Chunma	9	26
3	(South Korea) Kim Dae-eui	Seongnam Ilhwa Chunma	9	27
9	(Brazil) Irineu Ricardo	Seongnam Ilhwa Chunma	8	20
9	(South Korea) Kim Do-hoon	Jeonbuk Hyundai Motors	8	22
9	(Brazil) Sandro Cardoso	Suwon Samsung Bluewings	8	22
9	(South Korea) Shin Byung-ho	Jeonnam Dragons	8	26

== Awards ==
=== Main awards ===
Award	Winner	Club
Most Valuable Player	(South Korea) Kim Dae-eui	Seongnam Ilhwa Chunma
Top goalscorer	(Portugal) Edmilson	Jeonbuk Hyundai Motors
Top assist provider	(South Korea) Lee Chun-soo	Ulsan Hyundai Horang-i
Rookie of the Year	(South Korea) Lee Chun-soo	Ulsan Hyundai Horang-i
Manager of the Year	(South Korea) Cha Kyung-bok	Seongnam Ilhwa Chunma

=== Best XI ===
Position	Winner	Club
Goalkeeper	(South Korea) Lee Woon-jae	Suwon Samsung Bluewings
Defenders	(South Korea) Kim Hyun-soo	Seongnam Ilhwa Chunma
Defenders	(South Korea) Kim Tae-young	Jeonnam Dragons
Defenders	(South Korea) Choi Jin-cheul	Jeonbuk Hyundai Motors
Defenders	(South Korea) Hong Myung-bo	Pohang Steelers
Midfielders	(South Korea) Shin Tae-yong	Seongnam Ilhwa Chunma
Midfielders	(South Korea) Yoo Sang-chul	Ulsan Hyundai Horang-i
Midfielders	(Brazil) André	Anyang LG Cheetahs
Midfielders	(South Korea) Seo Jung-won	Suwon Samsung Bluewings
Forwards	(South Korea) Kim Dae-eui	Seongnam Ilhwa Chunma
Forwards	(South Korea) Lee Chun-soo	Ulsan Hyundai Horang-i

== See also ==
- 2002 Korean League Cup
- 2002 Korean FA Cup
