= K League Super Cup =

- Organiser(s): K League Federation
- Founded: 1999; 27 years ago
- Region: South Korea
- Teams: 2
- Most championships: Suwon Samsung Bluewings (3 titles)
- 2026 K League Super Cup

The K League Super Cup is the annual curtain-raiser to the South Korean football season, and is contested between the champions of K League 1 and Korea Cup since 1999. It is currently sponsored by Coupang Play.

== History ==
The K League Super Cup was dropped from the South Korean football calendar in 2007, but was reestablished from 2026 season onwards.

In 2004, Jeonbuk Hyundai Motors became the first Korea Cup champions to lift the Super Cup trophy. They are the only club to have won the Super Cup among the Korea Cup champions.

== Sponsorship ==
Season	Sponsor	Competition
1999–2000	TicketLink	TicketLink Super Cup
2001–2002	Posdata	Posdata Super Cup
2004–2005	None	K League Super Cup
2006	Samsung Electronics	Samsung Hauzen Super Cup
2026	Coupang Play	Coupang Play K League Super Cup

== Rules ==
- K League 1 champions and Korea Cup champions participated in a single match.
- Matches took place at the home venue of the league champions.
- When the match finished as a draw after normal time, it decided on winners after extra time and a penalty shoot-out.

== Results ==
Date	K League 1 champions	Score	Korea Cup champions	Venue

20 March 1999	Suwon Samsung Bluewings	5–1	Anyang LG Cheetahs	Suwon Sports Complex, Suwon
	Parakhnevych 11'; Drakulić 24', 87', 90'; Shin Hong-gi 76' (pen.)	Report	Baek Hyung-jin 45'	Attendance: 15,077

12 March 2000	Suwon Samsung Bluewings	0–0 (a.e.t.) (5–4 p)	Seongnam Ilhwa Chunma	Suwon Sports Complex, Suwon
				Attendance: 14,021

18 March 2001	Anyang LG Cheetahs	2–1 (a.e.t.)	Jeonbuk Hyundai Motors	Anyang Stadium, Anyang
	Wang Jung-hyun 26'; André 91'		Choi Jin-cheul 11'	Attendance: 20,118

10 March 2002	Seongnam Ilhwa Chunma	1–0	Daejeon Citizen	Seongnam 2 Stadium, Seongnam
	Drakulić 90'			Attendance: 14,450

16 March 2003	Seongnam Ilhwa Chunma	Cancelled	Suwon Samsung Bluewings
		Report
Note: Not held due to Seongnam Ilhwa Chunma's schedule for the 2002–03 AFC Champions League

21 March 2004	Seongnam Ilhwa Chunma	0–2	Jeonbuk Hyundai Motors	Seongnam 2 Stadium, Seongnam
		Report	Namkung Do 18'; Edmilson 89'	Attendance: 15,350

1 March 2005	Suwon Samsung Bluewings	1–0	Busan IPark	Suwon World Cup Stadium, Suwon
	Nádson 28'			Attendance: 21,784

4 March 2006	Ulsan Hyundai Horang-i	1–0	Jeonbuk Hyundai Motors	Ulsan Munsu Football Stadium, Ulsan
	Jang Sang-won 88'			Attendance: 7,356

2007 to 2025	Abolished

21 February 2026	Jeonbuk Hyundai Motors (Double winners)	2–0	Daejeon Hana Citizen (K League 1 runners-up)	Jeonju World Cup Stadium, Jeonju
	Mota 32'; Orobó 67'	Report		Attendance: 17,937

== Titles by club ==
- K League's principle of official statistics is that final club succeeds to predecessor club's history & records.

Club	Titles	Winning seasons
Suwon Samsung Bluewings	3	1999, 2000, 2005
Jeonbuk Hyundai Motors	2	2004, 2026
Seongnam Ilhwa Chunma	1	2002
FC Seoul	1	2001
Ulsan Hyundai Horang-i	1	2006

== See also ==
- K League
- K League 1
- Korea Cup (domestic)
