= Sung Han-soo =

South Korean footballer

Personal information
- Date of birth: March 10, 1976 (age 50)
- Place of birth: Seoul, South Korea
- Height: 1.77 m (5 ft 10 in)
- Position: Forward

Team information
- Current team: Hanmin University

Youth career
- Yonsei University

Senior career*
| Years | Team | Apps | (Gls) |
| 1999–2001 | Daejeon Citizen | 30 | (3) |
| 2002–2004 | Chunnam Dragons | 12 | (0) |
| 2005–2007 | Changwon City | | |

Managerial career
- 2007–present: Hanmin University (Coach)
- * Club domestic league appearances and goals

- Sung Han-soo
- Hangul: 성한수
- RR: Seong Hansu
- MR: Sŏng Hansu

Sung Han-soo (born March 10, 1976) is a South Korean football player who played at Changwon City.

== Club career ==
- 1999–2001 Daejeon Citizen
- 2002–2004 Chunnam Dragons
- 2005–2007 Changwon City
