= Suwon Sports Complex =

Stadium in Suwon, South Korea

- Castle Park

- Interactive map of Suwon Sports Complex
- Full name: Suwon Sports Complex Main Stadium
- Location: 775, Jowon-dong, Jangan-gu, Suwon, Gyeonggi-do, South Korea
- Coordinates: 37°17′52″N 127°00′41″E
- Owner: City of Suwon
- Operator: Suwon City Facilities Management Corporation
- Capacity: 11,808
- Surface: Grass

Construction
- Opened: October 1971
- Renovated: 1986, 2007, 2011

Tenants
- Yukong Elephants (1987–1990); Suwon Samsung Bluewings (1996–2001); Suwon FC (2003–present); Suwon FC Women (2015–present): Major sporting events hosted; 2007 FIFA U-17 World Cup

Suwon Sports Complex (Korean: 수원종합운동장; Hanja: 水原総合運動場振) is a group of sports facilities in Suwon, South Korea. The complex consists of the Suwon Stadium, Suwon Baseball Stadium, and Suwon Gymnasium.

== Facilities ==
=== Suwon Stadium ===
Suwon Stadium is a multi-purpose stadium and currently used mostly for football matches. Built in 1971, it has a capacity of 11,808 and was the home ground of the Suwon Samsung Bluewings until 2001, when they moved to the Suwon World Cup Stadium. It is currently home to K League 1 side Suwon FC.

=== Suwon Baseball Stadium ===
- For details, see Suwon KT Wiz Park.

=== Suwon Gymnasium ===
- For details, see Suwon Gymnasium.

The gymnasium, with a capacity of 5,145, was built in 1963 and hosted the handball events of the 1988 Summer Olympics.

== Gallery ==
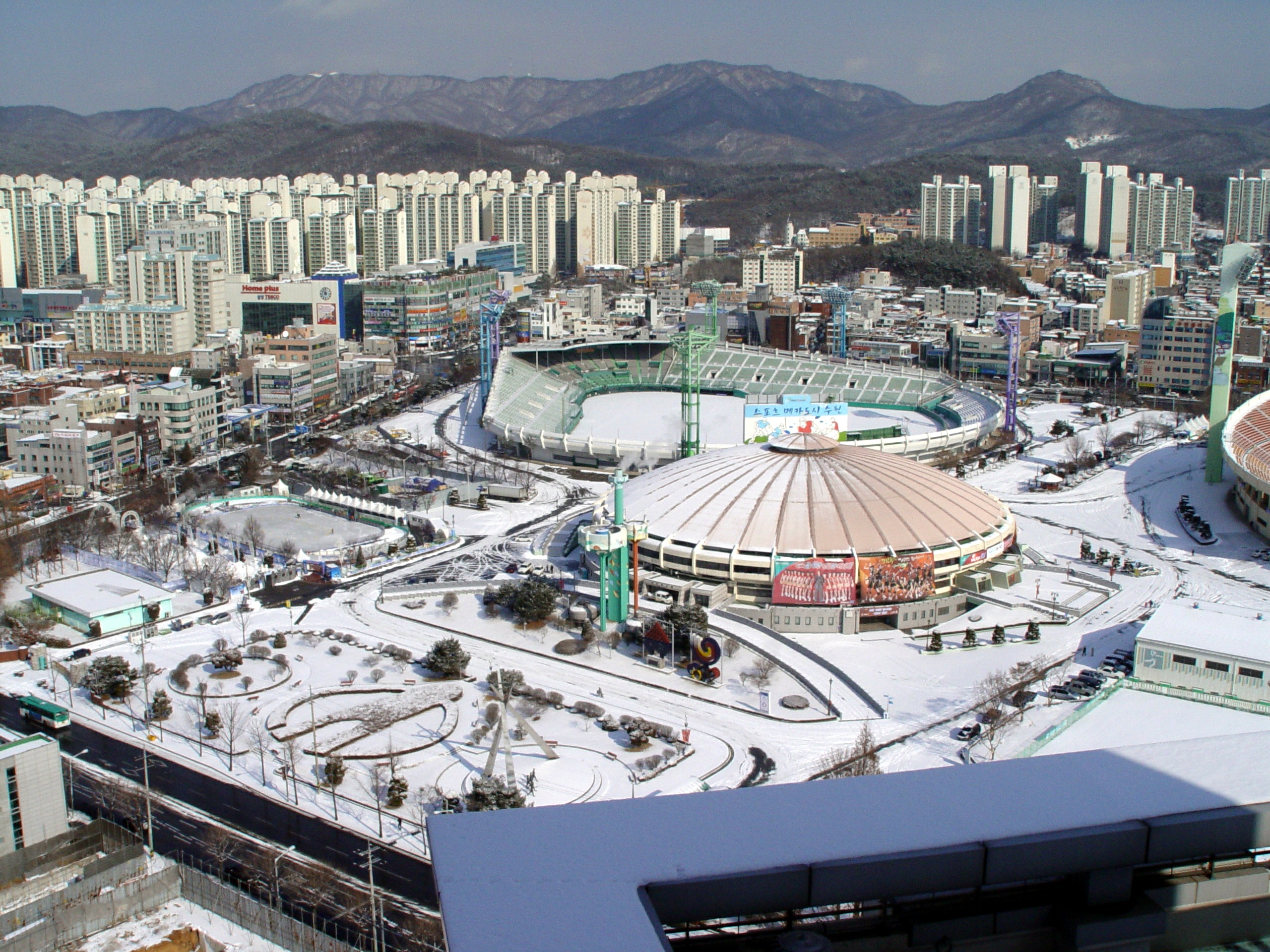
Suwon Baseball Stadium and Suwon Gymnasium

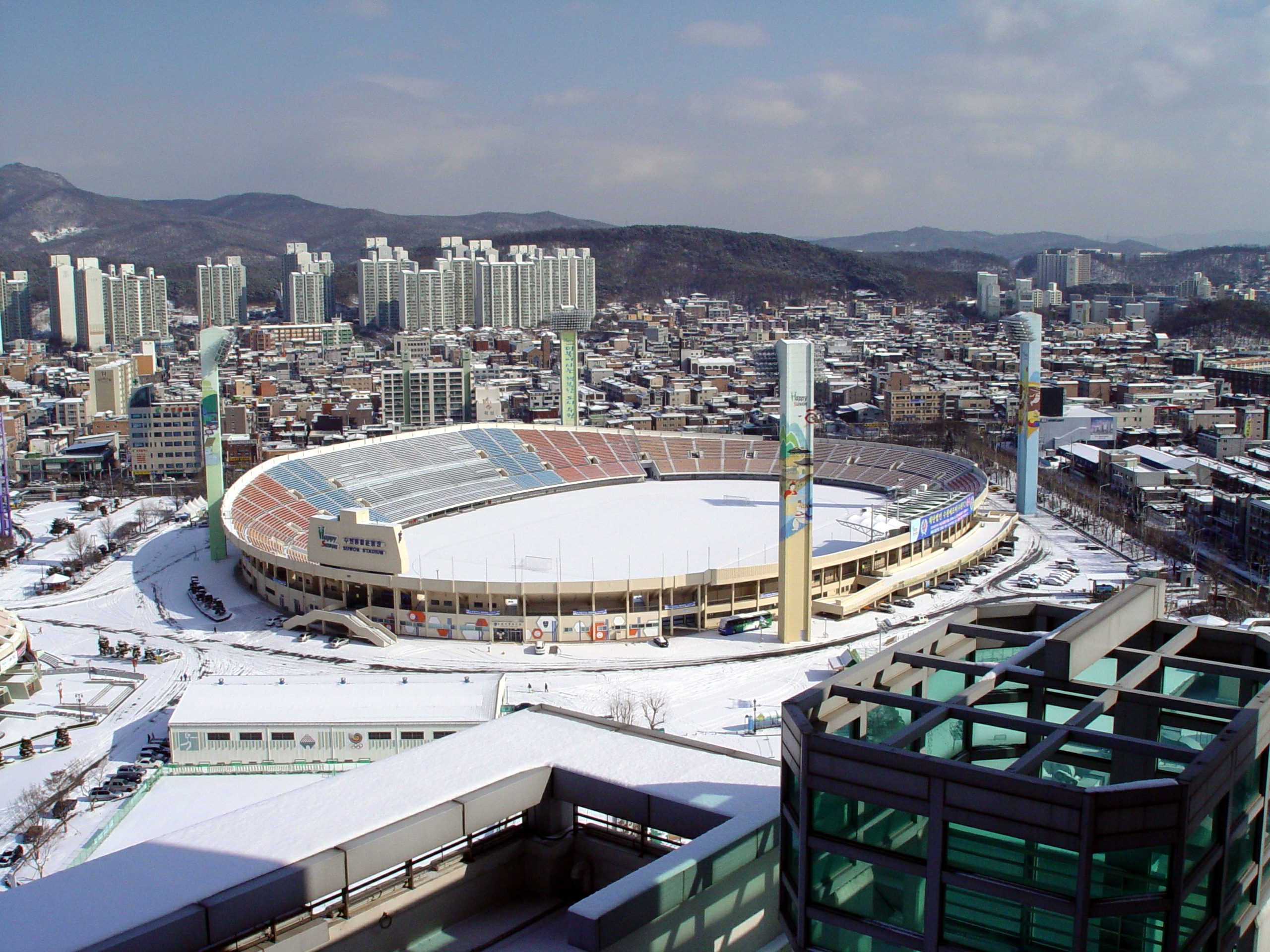
Main Stadium of Suwon Sports Complex

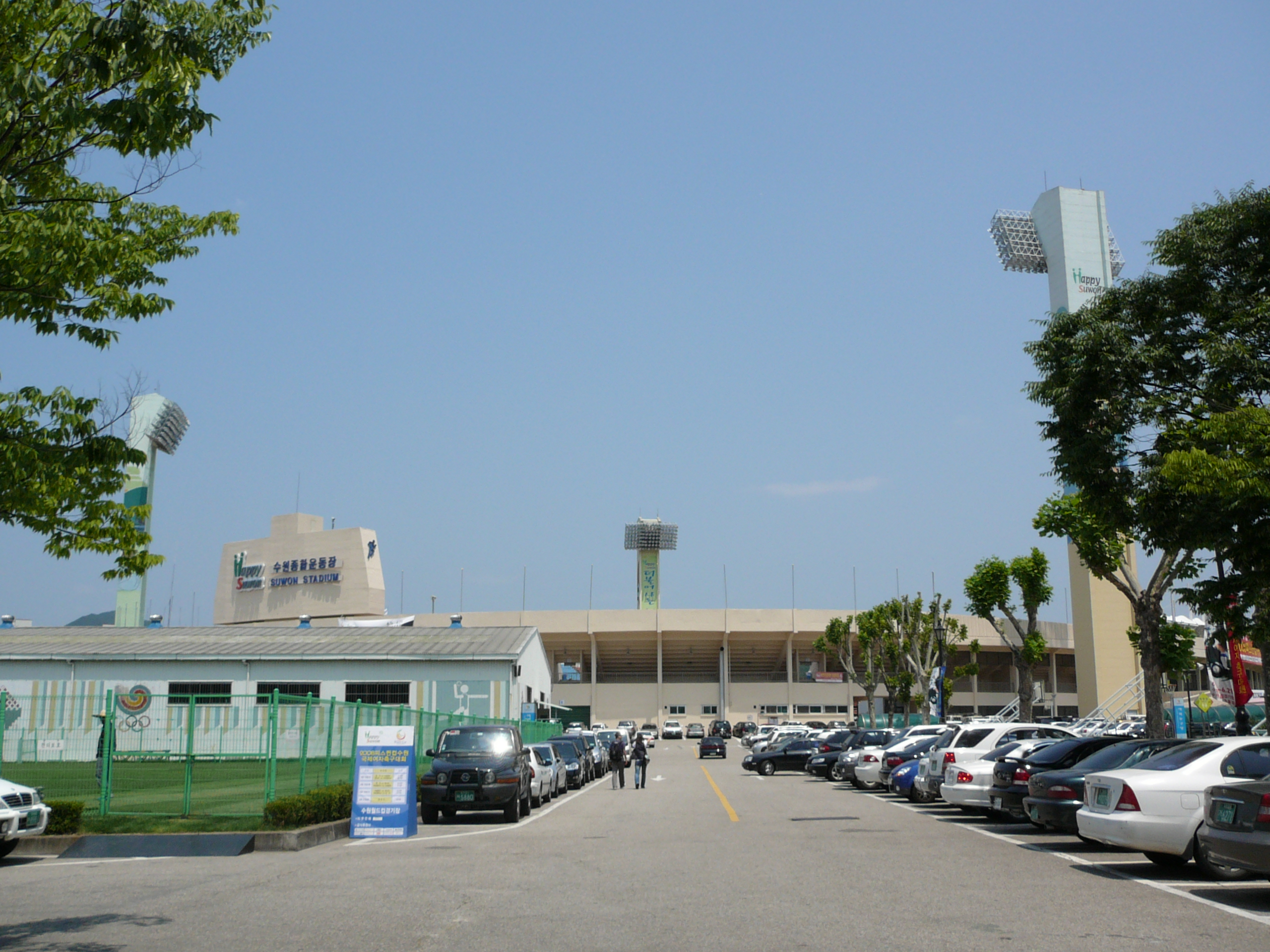
Main Stadium exterior

Gymnasium exterior

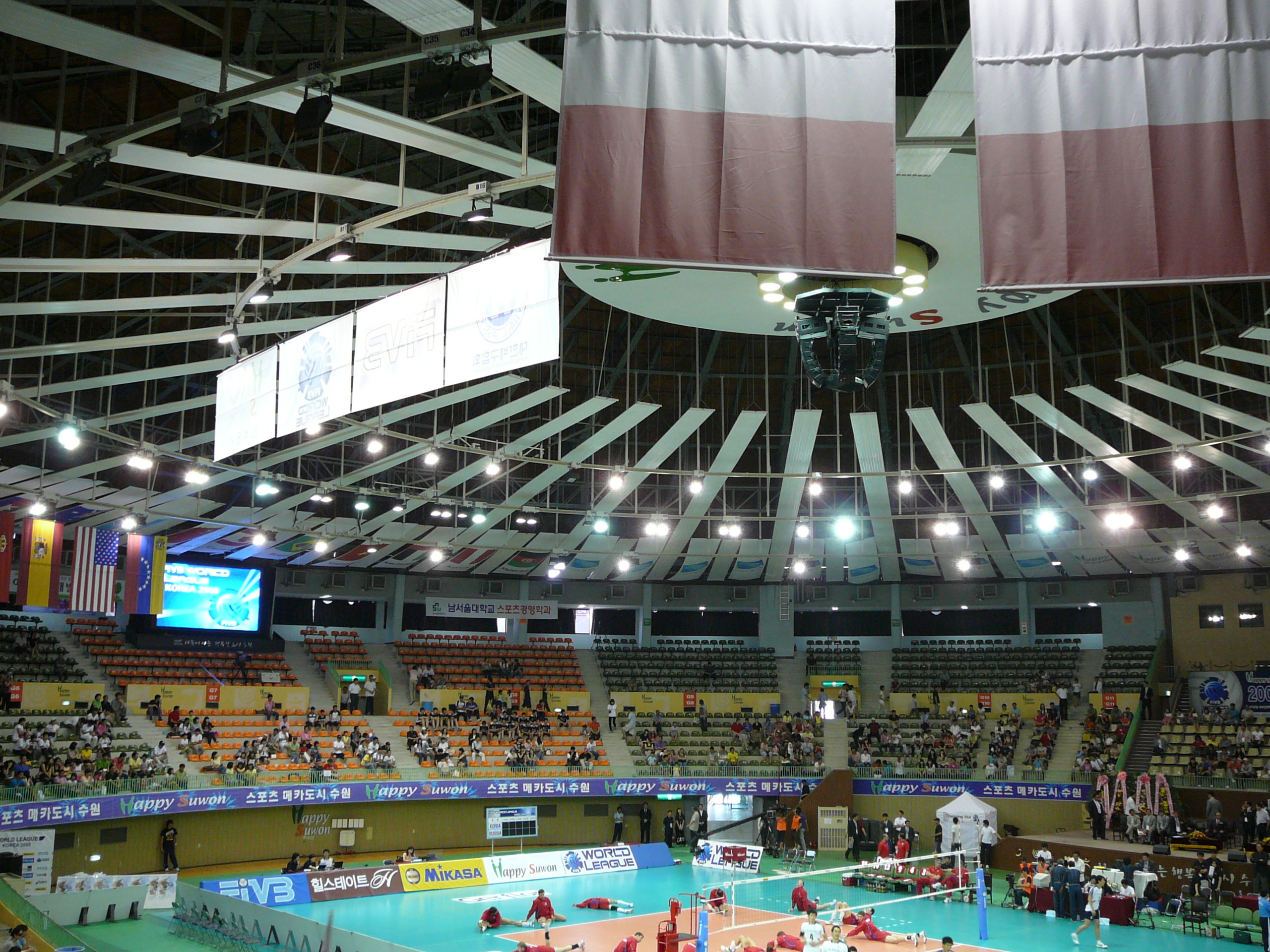
Gymnasium interior

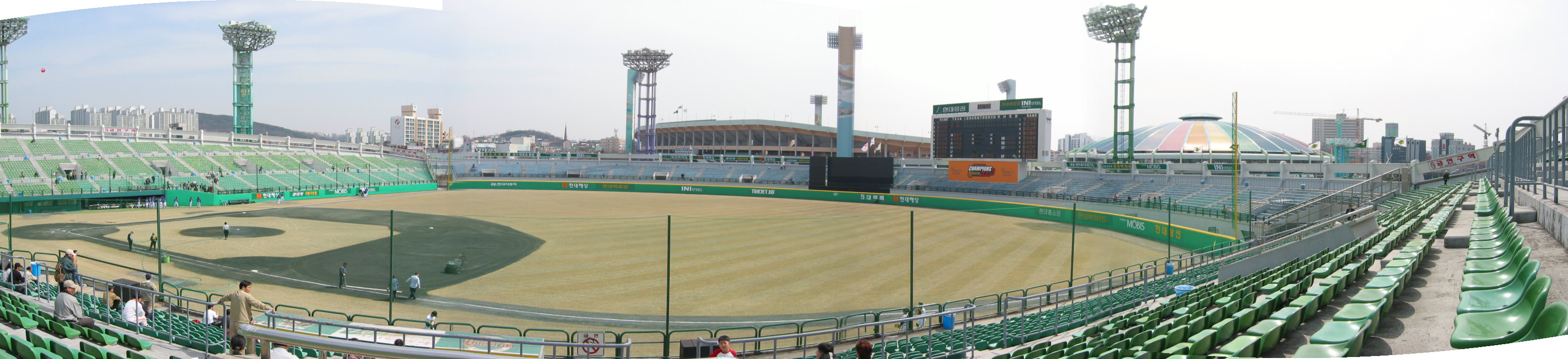
Baseball Stadium interior

== See also ==
- Suwon Gymnasium
- Suwon Baseball Stadium

Preceded by King Fahd Stadium; Riyadh	Asian Club Championship; Final Venue; 2001	Succeeded by Azadi Stadium; Tehran
