= Saša Drakulić =

Serbian footballer (born 1972)

Personal information
- Full name: Saša Drakulić
- Date of birth: 28 August 1972 (age 54)
- Place of birth: Vinkovci, SFR Yugoslavia
- Height: 1.90 m (6 ft 3 in)
- Position: Forward

Senior career*
| Years | Team | Apps | (Gls) |
| 1992–1993 | Bačka | | |
| 1993–1994 | Red Star Belgrade | 0 | (0) |
| 1993 | → Priština (loan) | | |
| 1994 | → Borac Čačak (loan) | | |
| 1994 | → Obilić (loan) | 8 | (3) |
| 1995–1998 | Daewoo Royals | 57 | (16) |
| 1998–1999 | Suwon Samsung Bluewings | 40 | (25) |
| 2000 | Kashiwa Reysol | 2 | (0) |
| 2000 | → Suwon Samsung Bluewings (loan) | 14 | (5) |
| 2001–2003 | Ilhwa Chunma | 90 | (27) |
| 2004 | AEK Larnaca | 6 | (1) |
| 2005 | Vojvodina | 1 | (0) |
| 2006 | ČSK Čelarevo | 17 | (14) |
| 2006–2007 | Mladost Apatin | 21 | (7) |
| 2007 | Vojvodina | 12 | (4) |
| 2008–2009 | Proleter Novi Sad | 20 | (14) |
| 2010 | Mladost Apatin | 5 | (2) |
| 2010 | Cement Beočin | 5 | (4) |
| 2014–2015 | Borac Novi Sad | | |
| 2016–2017 | Brodarac | | |
| Total | | 302 | (123) |
- * Club domestic league appearances and goals

Saša Drakulić (Serbian Cyrillic: Саша Дракулић; born 28 August 1972) is a Serbian retired footballer who played as a forward. He went to South Korea in 1995 and during his nine seasons in the K League made a name for himself as one of the most successful foreign players ever in the league.

== Career ==
Drakulić joined Red Star Belgrade from Bačka in the summer of 1993.

=== In Asia ===
In 1995, he joined the Korean side Busan Daewoo Royals, scoring eight goals the first season. He played for the Busan Daewoo Royals until July 1998, when he made the switch to Suwon Samsung Bluewings. With the Bluewings he won two consecutive K-League Championships in 1998 and 1999, before making an ill-fated switch to J. League Division 1 side Kashiwa Reysol.

He spent a short unhappy period in Japan before returning to Suwon in May 2000, He was returned Suwon Samsung Bluewings as loan trade with Hwang Sun-hong in May 2000.

In 2001, he was on the move again, joining Seongnam Ilhwa Chunma. Drakulić won three Championship medals from 2001–2003 with the Chunma before departing the K-League and signing for Cypriot side AEK Larnaca.

During his nine seasons in K League, Drakulić scored 104 goals in his 271 matches (Regular season and League Cup, at the time the second-highest scoring tally in the history of the league. He holds the record for the most shots on goal with 941 strikes.

=== Return ===
In 2005, he moved back to the First League of Serbia and Montenegro with Vojvodina, but subsequently moved on to second division side ČSK Čelarevo at the start of 2006. After ČSK, Drakulić joined Mladost Apatin in July 2006.

After a successful year with Mladost, Drakulić moved back to Vojvodina in the summer of 2007, and made an appearance in the UEFA Cup tie against Hibernians FC. His Vojvodina contract was cancelled in December 2007 after he picked up a cruciate knee injury whilst playing in an indoor football tournament without the permission of his club.

== Honours ==
Busan Daewoo Royals

- K League: 1997
- League Cup: 1997-Adidas Cup, 1997-Prospecs Cup

Suwon Samsung Bluewings

- K League: 1998, 1999
- League Cup: 1999-Adidas Cup, 1999-Daehan Fire Insurance Cup
- Super Cup: 1999

Seongnam Ilhaw Chunma

- K League: 2001, 2002, 2003
- League Cup: 2002-Adidas Cup

Individual

- K League Top Scorer: 1999
- K League Best XI: 1998, 1999

== Club statistics ==
- Other competitive competitions, including the Korean Super Cup, Asian Super Cup, A3 Champions Cup, Peace Cup.

| Club | Season | League | | National Cup | | League Cup | | Continental | | Other | | Total | |
| Club | Season | Apps | Goals | Apps | Goals | Apps | Goals | Apps | Goals | Apps | Goals | Apps | Goals |
|---|---|---|---|---|---|---|---|---|---|---|---|---|---|
| Obilić | 1994–95 | 8 | 3 | | | — | | — | | — | | 8 | 3 |
| Busan Daewoo Royals | 1995 | 25 | 7 | — | | 6 | 1 | — | | | | 31 | 8 |
| Busan Daewoo Royals | 1996 | 19 | 3 | | | 1 | 0 | — | | | | 20 | 3 |
| Busan Daewoo Royals | 1997 | 13 | 6 | | | 15 | 5 | — | | | | 28 | 11 |
| Busan Daewoo Royals | 1998 | 0 | 0 | | | 13 | 4 | — | | | | 13 | 4 |
| Busan Daewoo Royals | Total | 57 | 16 | | | 35 | 10 | — | | | | 92 | 26 |
| Suwon Samsung Bluewings | 1998 | 16 | 8 | | | 0 | 0 | | | 2 | 0 | 18 | 8 |
| Suwon Samsung Bluewings | 1999 | 24 | 17 | | | 11 | 5 | | | 2 | 1 | 37 | 23 |
| Suwon Samsung Bluewings | Total | 40 | 25 | | | 11 | 5 | | | 4 | 1 | 55 | 31 |
| Kashiwa Reysol | 2000 | 2 | 0 | | | 0 | 0 | | | | | 2 | 0 |
| Suwon Samsung Bluewings (loan) | 2000 | 14 | 5 | | | 0 | 0 | | | | | 14 | 5 |
| Seongnam Ilhwa Chunma | 2001 | 25 | 10 | | | 9 | 5 | | | | | 34 | 15 |
| Seongnam Ilhwa Chunma | 2002 | 26 | 9 | | | 11 | 10 | | | | | 37 | 19 |
| Seongnam Ilhwa Chunma | 2003 | 39 | 8 | | | 0 | 0 | | | | | 39 | 8 |
| Seongnam Ilhwa Chunma | Total | 90 | 27 | | | 20 | 15 | | | | | 110 | 42 |
| AEK Larnaca | 2004–05 | 6 | 1 | | | — | | 2 | 0 | — | | 8 | 1 |
| Career total | | 217 | 77 | | | 66 | 30 | 2 | 0 | 4 | 1 | 289 | 108 |
