= Vitaliy Parakhnevych =

Tajikistani footballer (born 1969)

Personal information
- Full name: Vitaliy Valeriyovych Parakhnevych
- Date of birth: 4 May 1969 (age 57)
- Place of birth: Donetsk, Ukrainian SSR, Soviet Union
- Height: 1.87 m (6 ft 2 in)
- Position: Forward

Senior career*
Years	Team	Apps	(Gls)
1987	Naftovyk Okhtyrka	34	(4)
1988–1992	Odesa	96	(32)
1989	→ Tighina Bender (loan)	2	(0)
1992	Nyva Ternopil	8	(0)
1993–1995	Chornomorets Odesa	47	(14)
1995	Lokomotiv Moscow	10	(0)
1995–1998	Chonbuk Hyundai Dinos	52	(18)
1998–2000	Suwon Samsung Bluewings	43	(12)
2000	→ Shonan Bellmare (loan)	5	(1)
2001	Anyang LG Cheetahs	9	(2)
2002	Bucheon SK	0	(0)
2003	Chornomorets Odesa	2	(0)
2003	→ Chornomorets-2 Odesa	3	(0)
2004	Dniester Ovidiopol	8	(2)

International career
1997	Tajikistan	1	(0)
- * Club domestic league appearances and goals

Vitaliy Valeriyovych Parakhnevych (Ukrainian: Віталій Валерійович Парахневич; born 4 May 1969) is a Tajikistani retired footballer who played as a forward. He also held Ukrainian citizenship before 1996.

== Career ==
In August 1997, the Tajikistan national team was to take 16 players to South Korea to face the South Korea national team, but due to missing passports, only 12 players traveled. As a result, the Tajikistan Football Federation called upon Parakhnevych and Valeri Sarychev who were currently playing in the Korean K League.

== Career statistics ==
Tajikistan national team
Year	Apps	Goals
1997	1	0
Total	1	0
