= 1999 K League =

Buy Korea Cup K League
- Season: 1999
- Dates: Regular season: 30 May – 13 October 1999; Championship: 17–31 October 1999
- Champions: Suwon Samsung Bluewings (2nd title)
- Asian Club Championship: Suwon Samsung Bluewings
- Cup Winners' Cup: Cheonan Ilhwa Chunma
- Matches played: 135
- Goals scored: 417 (3.09 per match)
- Best Player: Ahn Jung-hwan
- Top goalscorer: Saša Drakulić (18 goals)

The 1999 K League was the 17th season of K League. In the second leg of the playoffs final, Saša Drakulić's golden goal scored with his hand caused controversy. His handball was recognized as a goal by the Chinese referee Sun Baojie, and it directly determined Suwon's league title. Under the influence of controversy, Drakulić failed to win the MVP Award.

== Regular season ==
Pos	Team	Pld	W	OW	PW	L	GF	GA	GD	Pts	Qualification
1	Suwon Samsung Bluewings	27	18	2	1	6	56	24	+32	59	Qualification for the playoffs final
2	Bucheon SK	27	11	7	0	9	48	39	+9	47	Qualification for the playoffs semi-final
3	Jeonnam Dragons	27	9	3	5	10	43	38	+5	38	Qualification for the playoffs first round
4	Busan Daewoo Royals	27	10	3	1	13	37	36	+1	37	Qualification for the playoffs first round
5	Pohang Steelers	27	11	1	0	15	42	41	+1	35	
6	Ulsan Hyundai Horang-i	27	9	1	2	15	38	46	−8	31	
7	Jeonbuk Hyundai Dinos	27	7	3	2	15	40	44	−4	29	
8	Daejeon Citizen	27	6	3	0	18	41	53	−12	24	
9	Anyang LG Cheetahs	27	6	2	2	17	38	52	−14	24	
10	Cheonan Ilhwa Chunma	27	5	3	2	17	34	44	−10	23	Qualification for the Cup Winners' Cup

Source: RSSSF
Rules for classification: W) 3 points; WG) won with golden goal, 2 points; WP) won after penalty shoot-out, 1 point

== Championship playoffs ==
=== Bracket ===
First round
3	Jeonnam Dragons	0
4	Busan Daewoo Royals	1

Semi-final
2	Bucheon SK	0	0	0
1R	Busan Daewoo Royals	1	1	2

Final
SF	Busan Daewoo Royals	1	1_{aet}	X	0W
1	Suwon Samsung Bluewings	2	2_{aet}	X	2W

=== Final table ===
Pos	Team	Qualification
1	Suwon Samsung Bluewings (C)	Qualification for the Asian Club Championship
2	Busan Daewoo Royals	
3	Bucheon SK	
4	Jeonnam Dragons	

Source: RSSSF
(C) Champions

== Awards ==
=== Main awards ===
Award	Winner	Club
Most Valuable Player	(South Korea) Ahn Jung-hwan	Busan Daewoo Royals
Top goalscorer	(Federal Republic of Yugoslavia) Saša Drakulić	Suwon Samsung Bluewings
Top assist provider	(South Korea) Byun Jae-sub	Jeonbuk Hyundai Dinos
Rookie of the Year	(South Korea) Lee Sung-jae	Bucheon SK
Manager of the Year	(South Korea) Kim Ho	Suwon Samsung Bluewings

=== Best XI ===
Position	Winner	Club
Goalkeeper	(South Korea) Lee Woon-jae	Suwon Samsung Bluewings
Defenders	(South Korea) Kang Chul	Bucheon SK
Defenders	(South Korea) Kim Joo-sung	Busan Daewoo Royals
Defenders	(Brazil) Maciel	Jeonnam Dragons
Defenders	(South Korea) Shin Hong-gi	Suwon Samsung Bluewings
Midfielders	(South Korea) Seo Jung-won	Suwon Samsung Bluewings
Midfielders	(South Korea) Ko Jong-soo	Suwon Samsung Bluewings
Midfielders	(Russia) Denis Laktionov	Suwon Samsung Bluewings
Midfielders	(South Korea) Ko Jeong-woon	Pohang Steelers
Forwards	(South Korea) Ahn Jung-hwan	Busan Daewoo Royals
Forwards	(Federal Republic of Yugoslavia) Saša Drakulić	Suwon Samsung Bluewings

== See also ==
- 1999 K League Championship
- 1999 Korean League Cup
- 1999 Korean League Cup (Supplementary Cup)
- 1999 Korean FA Cup
