= 2001 Suwon Samsung Bluewings season =

Suwon Samsung Bluewings
2001 season
- Head Coach: Kim Ho
- Stadium: Suwon Sports Complex; Big Bird
- K-League: 3rd
- FA Cup: Round of 20
- League Cup: Winners
- Club Championship: Winners
- Top goalscorer: League: All: Sandro (17)
Home colours	Away colours

The 2001 Suwon Samsung Bluewings season was Suwon Samsung Bluewings's sixth season in the K-League in Republic of Korea. Suwon Samsung Bluewings is competing in K-League, League Cup, Korean FA Cup, Asian Club Championship and Asian Super Cup.

== Squad ==
Note: Flags indicate national team as defined under FIFA eligibility rules; some limited exceptions apply. Players may hold more than one non-FIFA nationality.

No.	Pos.	Nation	Player
1	GK	KOR	Shin Bum-Chul
2	DF	KOR	Park Choong-Kyun
3	DF	KOR	Lee Byung-Keun
4	DF	CRO	Ivanković
6	DF	KOR	Lee Ki-Hyung
7	MF	KOR	Kim Jin-woo
8	FW	NGA	Lucky
8	MF	KOR	Choi Moon-Sik
9	MF	KOR	Seo Dong-Won
10	FW	ROU	Luțu
10	FW	YUG	Alen
11	FW	RUS	Denis
12	MF	KOR	Cho Hyun-Doo
13	FW	BRA	Sandro
14	FW	KOR	Seo Jung-Won
15	DF	KOR	Shin Hong-Gi
16	DF	KOR	Kim Young-Sun
17	FW	KOR	Lee Ki-Bum
18	FW	KOR	Park Kun-Ha (captain)
19	DF	YUG	Zoli
20	DF	KOR	Ryu Woong-Yeol
21	GK	KOR	Park Ho-Jin
22	MF	KOR	Ko Jong-Su
23	MF	KOR	Jang Ji-Hyun

No.	Pos.	Nation	Player
24	MF	KOR	Oh Kyu-Chan
25	MF	KOR	Kim Do-Heon
26	MF	KOR	Kang Dae-Hee
27	FW	KOR	Lee Yong-Woo
28	MF	KOR	Kim Ki-Bum
29	DF	KOR	Yang Jong-Hoo
30	DF	KOR	Kim Min-Sung
31	GK	KOR	Lee Chang-Deok
32	DF	KOR	Son Seung-Joon
33	DF	KOR	Lee Sang-Tae
34	DF	KOR	Nam Ki-Sung
35	DF	KOR	Cho Jae-Min
36	MF	KOR	Lee Yeo-Sung
37	DF	KOR	Cho Sung-Hwan
39	DF	KOR	Bang Ho-Jin
40	DF	KOR	Lee Dong-Wook
41	GK	KOR	Kim Kwang-Soo
42	FW	KOR	Lee Kyung-Woo
43	FW	KOR	Cho Jae-Jin
44	MF	KOR	Ryu Hee-Seok
45	DF	KOR	Lee Kyung-Keun
46	FW	KOR	Kim Dae-Hyun
47		KOR	Jung Sang-Nam

== Backroom staff ==
=== Coaching staff ===
- Head coach: (South Korea) Kim Ho
- Assistant coach: (South Korea) Choi Kang-Hee
- Coach: (South Korea) Wang Sun-Jae
- Coach: (South Korea) Yoon Sung-Hyo
- GK Coach: (Brazil) Cosa

=== Scouter ===
- (South Korea) Jung Kyu-Poong

== Honours ==
=== Club ===
- Asian Club Championship Winners
- Asian Super Cup Winners
- K-League Cup Winners
- AFC Club of the Year

=== Individual ===
- K-League Top Scorer: (Brazil) Sandro (17 goals)
- K-League Best XI: (South Korea) Seo Jung-Won, (Brazil) Sandro
