= 2002 Suwon Samsung Bluewings season =

Suwon Samsung Bluewings
2002 season
- Head Coach: Kim Ho
- Stadium: Big Bird
- K-League: 3rd
- FA Cup: Winners
- League Cup: Semifinals
- Club Championship: Winners
- Asian Super Cup: Winners
- Top goalscorer: League: All: Sandro (10)
Home colours	Away colours

The 2002 Suwon Samsung Bluewings season was Suwon Samsung Bluewings's seventh season in the K-League in Republic of Korea. Suwon Samsung Bluewings is competing in K-League, League Cup, Korean FA Cup, Asian Club Championship and Asian Super Cup.

== Squad ==
Note: Flags indicate national team as defined under FIFA eligibility rules; some limited exceptions apply. Players may hold more than one non-FIFA nationality.

No.	Pos.	Nation	Player
1	GK	KOR	Lee Woon-Jae
2	DF	KOR	Cho Byung-Kuk
3	DF	KOR	Lee Byung-Keun
4	MF	KOR	Kim Do-Heon
5	DF	KOR	Cho Sung-Hwan
6	DF	KOR	Lee Ki-Hyung
7	MF	KOR	Kim Jin-woo
8	MF	KOR	Ko Chang-Hyun
9	MF	KOR	Jung Yong-Hoon
10	MF	ROU	Gabi
11	FW	RUS	Denis
12	MF	KOR	Cho Hyun-Doo
13	FW	BRA	Sandro
14	FW	KOR	Seo Jung-Won (captain)
15	DF	KOR	Shin Hong-Gi
16	DF	KOR	Kim Young-Sun
17	MF	KOR	Son Dae-Ho
18	FW	KOR	Park Kun-Ha
19	DF	YUG	Zoli
19	FW	BIH	Mitro
20	DF	KOR	Choi Sung-Yong
21	GK	KOR	Shin Bum-Chul
22	MF	KOR	Ko Jong-Su
23	MF	KOR	Hwang In-Soo

No.	Pos.	Nation	Player
24	MF	KOR	Oh Kyu-Chan
25	MF	KOR	Kim Dong-Hyun
26	MF	KOR	Kang Dae-Hee
27	FW	KOR	Lee Yong-Woo
28	MF	KOR	Kim Ki-Bum
29	MF	KOR	Ha Tae-Keun
30	MF	KOR	Lee Jong-Min
31	GK	KOR	Park Ho-Jin
32	DF	KOR	Son Seung-Joon
33	FW	KOR	Lee Sun-Woo
34	MF	KOR	Cho Man-Keun
35	DF	KOR	Cho Jae-Min
36	MF	KOR	Lee Yeo-Sung
37	DF	KOR	Kim Yoo-Jin
39	FW	KOR	Lee Kwan-Hee
40	DF	KOR	Lee Dong-Wook
41	GK	KOR	Kim Kwang-Soo
42	FW	KOR	Yoon Hwa-Pyung
43	DF	KOR	Lee Gang-Jin
44	MF	KOR	Kim Jun
45	FW	YUG	Alen
46	DF	KOR	Lee Tae-Kwon
—	DF	KOR	Ahn Dong-Won

== Backroom staff ==
=== Coaching staff ===
- Head coach: (South Korea) Kim Ho
- Assistant coach: (South Korea) Wang Sun-Jae
- Coach: (South Korea) Yoon Sung-Hyo
- GK Coach: (Brazil) Cosa
- Video analyst: (Iran) Afshin Ghotbi

=== Scouter ===
- (South Korea) Jung Kyu-Poong

== Honours ==
=== Club ===
- Asian Club Championship Winners
- Asian Super Cup Winners
- Korean FA Cup Winners

=== Individual ===
- K-League Best XI: (South Korea) Lee Woon-Jae, (South Korea) Seo Jung-Won
- Korean FA Cup MVP: (South Korea) Seo Jung-Won
