= 1997 Suwon Samsung Bluewings season =

Suwon Samsung Bluewings
1997 season
- Head Coach: Kim Ho
- Stadium: Suwon Sports Complex
- K-League: 5th
- FA Cup: Quarterfinals
- League Cup: Adidas: 6th Pro-Specs: 3rd
- Top goalscorer: League: All: Cho Hyun-Doo (7)
Home colours	Away colours

The 1997 Suwon Samsung Bluewings season was Suwon Samsung Bluewings's second season in the K-League in Republic of Korea. Suwon Samsung Bluewings is competing in K-League, League Cup and Korean FA Cup.

== Squad ==
Note: Flags indicate national team as defined under FIFA eligibility rules; some limited exceptions apply. Players may hold more than one non-FIFA nationality.

No.	Pos.	Nation	Player
1	GK	KOR	Lee Woon-Jae
2	DF	KOR	Park Choong-Kyun
3	DF	KOR	Lee Byung-Keun
4	DF	KOR	Jung Sung-Hoon
5	DF	KOR	Shin Sung-Hwan (captain)
6	DF	KOR	Lee Ki-Hyung
7	MF	KOR	Kim Jin-woo
8	MF	ROU	Badea
9	FW	KOR	Lee Jin-Haeng
10	MF	KOR	Cho Hyun-Doo
11	FW	KOR	Kim Yi-Joo
12	MF	KOR	Cho Hyun
13	DF	KOR	Jung Yoon-Chae
14	DF	KOR	Jeon Jae-Bok
15	MF	KOR	Lee Kwang-Jong
16	DF	KOR	Lee Kyung-Soo
17	FW	KOR	Lee Ki-Keun
18	FW	KOR	Park Kun-Ha
19	MF	ROU	Oli
20	DF	KOR	Lee Sang-Wook
21	FW	RUS	Yuri
22	MF	KOR	Ko Jong-Soo
23	FW	KOR	Hong Sung-Ho

No.	Pos.	Nation	Player
24	DF	KOR	Kim Jae-Sin
25	MF	KOR	Han Sang-Yeol
26	DF	KOR	Kim Doo-Ham
27	FW	ROU	Jian
27	MF	KOR	Seol Ik-Chan
28	FW	KOR	Lee Yong-Woo
29	FW	KOR	Kim Ki-Ho
30	DF	KOR	Lee Kyung-Keun
31	GK	KOR	Kim Kwang-Soo
32	DF	KOR	Park Jung-Suk
33	FW	RUS	Denis
34	MF	KOR	Cho Jae-Min
35	FW	KOR	Lim Jung-Ho
36	DF	KOR	Lim Kwang-Uk
37	DF	KOR	Kim Dae-Hee
38	MF	KOR	Yoon Sung-Hyo
39	DF	KOR	Kang Nam-Gil
40	GK	KOR	Park Chul-Woo
41	GK	KOR	Lee Joon-Ho
42	MF	KOR	Jung Kwang-Bae
43	MF	KOR	Yang Jin-Seok
—	MF	KOR	Choi Sung-Ho
—	FW	KOR	Kwon Hyuk-Chul

== Backroom staff ==
=== Coaching staff ===
Position	Staff
Head Coach	(South Korea) Kim Ho
Offence Coach	(South Korea) Cho Kwang-Rae
Defence Coach	(South Korea) Choi Kang-Hee
Reserve Team Coach	(South Korea) Park Hang-Seo
Scouter	(South Korea) Jung Kyu-Poong

Last updated: 2012
Source: Suwon Bluewings

== Honours ==
=== Individual ===
- K-League Top Assistor: (Russia) Denis (6 assists)
- K-League Cup Top Assistor: (South Korea) Ko Jong-Soo (4 assists)
- K-League Best XI: (South Korea) Lee Jin-Haeng
