= 1996 Suwon Samsung Bluewings season =

Suwon Samsung Bluewings
1996 season
- Head Coach: Kim Ho
- Stadium: Suwon Sports Complex
- K-League: Runners-up
- FA Cup: Runners-up
- League Cup: 6th
- Top goalscorer: League: All: Park Kun-Ha (7)
Home colours	Away colours

The 1996 Suwon Samsung Bluewings season was Suwon Samsung Bluewings's first season in the K-League in Republic of Korea. Suwon Samsung Bluewings is competing in K-League, League Cup and Korean FA Cup.

== Squad ==
Note: Flags indicate national team as defined under FIFA eligibility rules; some limited exceptions apply. Players may hold more than one non-FIFA nationality.

No.	Pos.	Nation	Player
1	GK	KOR	Lee Woon-Jae
2	DF	KOR	Kim Dong-Hae
3	DF	KOR	Lee Byung-Keun
4	DF	KOR	Kim Doo-Ham (captain)
5	DF	ALB	Adi
6	DF	KOR	Lee Ki-Hyung
7	MF	KOR	Kim Jin-woo
8	MF	ROU	Badea
9	FW	KOR	Lee Jin-Haeng
10	MF	KOR	Cho Hyun-Doo
11	FW	KOR	Kim Yi-Joo
12	MF	KOR	Cho Hyun
13	DF	KOR	Park Choong-Kyun
14	DF	KOR	Jeon Jae-Bok
15	MF	KOR	Lee Kwang-Jong
16	DF	KOR	Lee Kyung-Soo
17	FW	KOR	Lee Ki-Keun
18	FW	KOR	Park Kun-Ha
19	FW	BRA	Alaor
20	DF	KOR	Lee Sang-Wook
21	GK	DEN	Henrik

No.	Pos.	Nation	Player
21	FW	RUS	Yuri
22	MF	KOR	Ko Jong-Su
23	DF	KOR	Kim Young-Chul
24	DF	KOR	Jung Sung-Hoon
25	MF	KOR	Song Kyung-Seob
26	DF	KOR	Shin Sung-Hwan
27	MF	KOR	Seol Ik-Chan
28	FW	KOR	Lee Yong-Woo
29	FW	KOR	Lee Kyung-Woo
30	DF	KOR	Bang Ho-Jin
31	GK	KOR	Kim Kwang-Soo
32	DF	KOR	Park Jung-Suk
33	FW	RUS	Denis
34	MF	KOR	Lee Ho-Joon
35	FW	KOR	Kim Ho-Young
37	DF	KOR	Kim Dae-Hee
38	MF	KOR	Yoon Sung-Hyo
39	DF	KOR	Jeon Hwan-Chul
40	GK	KOR	Park Chul-Woo
41	GK	KOR	Joo Yong-Gook

== Backroom staff ==
=== Coaching staff ===
- Head Coach: (South Korea) Kim Ho
- Coach: (South Korea) Cho Kwang-Rae
- Trainer: (South Korea) Choi Kang-Hee

=== Scout ===
- (South Korea) Jung Kyu-Poong

== Honours ==
=== Individual ===
- K-League Rookie of the Year: (South Korea) Park Kun-Ha
- K-League Best XI: (South Korea) Yoon Sung-Hyo, (Romania) Badea
- Korean FA Cup Top Scorer: (Russia) Denis (4 goals)
