= 2003 Suwon Samsung Bluewings season =

Suwon Samsung Bluewings
2003 season
- Head Coach: Kim Ho
- Stadium: Big Bird
- K-League: 3rd
- FA Cup: Round of 32
- Top goalscorer: League: All: Nádson (14)
Home colours	Away colours

The 2003 Suwon Samsung Bluewings season was Suwon Samsung Bluewings's eighth season in the K-League in Republic of Korea. Suwon Samsung Bluewings is competing in K-League and Korean FA Cup.

== Squad ==
Note: Flags indicate national team as defined under FIFA eligibility rules; some limited exceptions apply. Players may hold more than one non-FIFA nationality.

No.	Pos.	Nation	Player
1	GK	KOR	Lee Woon-Jae (captain)
2	DF	KOR	Cho Byung-Kuk
3	DF	KOR	Lee Byung-Keun
4	MF	KOR	Kim Do-Heon
5	DF	KOR	Cho Sung-Hwan
6	DF	KOR	Kwak Hee-Ju
7	MF	KOR	Kim Jin-woo
8	MF	KOR	Ko Chang-Hyun
9	FW	BRA	Tuta
10	MF	ROU	Gabi
11	FW	BRA	Enio
12	FW	BRA	Nádson
13	MF	KOR	Jung Yong-Hoon
14	FW	KOR	Seo Jung-Won
15	MF	KOR	Kwon Jip
16	DF	KOR	Kim Young-Sun
17	MF	KOR	Son Dae-Ho
18	DF	KOR	Park Kun-Ha
19	FW	KOR	Namgoong Woong
20	DF	KOR	Choi Sung-Yong
21	GK	KOR	Shin Bum-Chul
23	DF	KOR	Park Ju-Sung
24	MF	KOR	Oh Kyu-Chan

No.	Pos.	Nation	Player
25	MF	KOR	Kim Dong-Hyun
26	FW	KOR	Shin Young-Rok
27	FW	KOR	Lee Yong-Woo
28	MF	KOR	Kim Ki-Bum
29	MF	KOR	Ha Tae-Keun
30	MF	KOR	Lee Jong-Min
31	GK	KOR	Kim Dae-Hwan
32	DF	KOR	Son Seung-Joon
33	FW	KOR	Lee Sun-Woo
34	MF	KOR	Kim Jun
35	DF	KOR	Cho Jae-Min
36	MF	KOR	Kim Joo-Hoi
37	FW	KOR	Jung Yoon-Sung
39	FW	KOR	Lee Kwan-Hee
40	DF	KOR	Lee Dong-Wook
41	GK	KOR	Kim Kwang-Soo
42	FW	KOR	Jung Sun-Woo
43	DF	KOR	Lee Gang-Jin
44	MF	YUG	Urumov
45	MF	KOR	Yoon Won-Il
46	DF	KOR	Oh Jin-Kwang
47	DF	KOR	Ryu Ki-Chun

== Backroom staff ==
=== Coaching staff ===
- Head coach: (South Korea) Kim Ho
- Assistant coach: (South Korea) Wang Sun-Jae
- Coach: (South Korea) Yoon Sung-Hyo
- Reserve Team Coach: (Iran) Afshin Ghotbi
- GK Coach: (Brazil) Cosa
- Physical trainer: (South Korea) Lee Chang-Yeop

=== Scouter ===
- (South Korea) Jung Kyu-Poong

== Honours ==
=== Individual ===
- K-League Best Goal: (South Korea) Seo Jung-Won
