= 2005 Suwon Samsung Bluewings season =

Suwon Samsung Bluewings
2005 season
- Chairman: Lee Yoon-Woo
- Head Coach: Cha Bum-Kun
- Stadium: Big Bird
- K-League: 9th
- FA Cup: Quarterfinals
- League Cup: Winners
- Champions League: Group E 2nd
- Top goalscorer: League: All: Mato (10)
Home colours	Away colours

The 2005 Suwon Samsung Bluewings season was Suwon Samsung Bluewings's tenth season in the K-League in Republic of Korea. Suwon Samsung Bluewings is competing in K-League, League Cup, Korean Super Cup, Korean FA Cup, A3 Champions Cup and AFC Champions League.

== Squad ==

2005 10th Anniversary
Best Eleven

Note: Flags indicate national team as defined under FIFA eligibility rules; some limited exceptions apply. Players may hold more than one non-FIFA nationality.

No.	Pos.	Nation	Player
1	GK	KOR	Lee Woon-Jae
2	DF	CRO	Mato
3	DF	KOR	Lee Byung-Keun
5	MF	KOR	Kim Nam-Il
6	FW	BRA	Itamar
7	MF	KOR	Kim Jin-woo
8	MF	KOR	Song Chong-Gug
9	FW	BRA	Sandro
10	FW	KOR	Kim Dong-Hyun
11	FW	KOR	Kim Dae-Eui
12	FW	BRA	Nádson
13	MF	KOR	Ahn Hyo-Yeon
14	MF	KOR	Kim Do-Keun
15	DF	KOR	Lee Sa-Vik
16	DF	KOR	Kim Young-Sun
17	MF	KOR	Son Jeong-Tak
18	DF	KOR	Park Kun-Ha
19	MF	KOR	Hwang Kyu-Hwan
20	DF	KOR	Choi Sung-Yong (captain)
21	GK	KOR	Kim Dae-Hwan
22	FW	KOR	Lee Hyun-Jin
23	MF	KOR	Cho Won-Hee

No.	Pos.	Nation	Player
24	DF	KOR	Cha Keon-Myung
26	MF	KOR	Choi Sung-Hyun
27	MF	KOR	Kim Dong-Hwan
28	MF	KOR	Kim Dong-Hyun
29	DF	KOR	Kwak Hee-Ju
30	MF	KOR	Kim Sang-Duk
31	GK	KOR	Park Ho-Jin
32	FW	KOR	Hwang Mu-Kyu
33	MF	KOR	Lee Sang-Tae
34	MF	KOR	Kim Jun
35	DF	KOR	Cho Jae-Min
36	DF	KOR	Jeon Hyun-Kyu
37	FW	KOR	Yoon Hwa-Pyung
39	FW	KOR	Shin Young-Rok
40	FW	KOR	Kim Sang-Ki
41	GK	KOR	Kwon Ki-Bo
42	DF	KOR	Lee Yong-Chan
43	DF	KOR	Lee Ki-Hyung
44	MF	KOR	Jang Ji-Hyun
45	DF	KOR	Han Sang-Min
46	DF	KOR	Lee Tae-Kwon

== Backroom staff ==
=== Coaching staff ===
- Head coach: (South Korea) Cha Bum-Kun
- Assistant coach: (Germany) Marco Pezzaiuoli
- Coach: (South Korea) Lee Lim-Saeng
- Reserve Team Coach: (South Korea) Choi Man-Hee
- GK Coach: (South Korea) Cho Byung-Deuk
- Physical trainer: (South Korea) Lee Chang-Yeop

=== Scout ===
- (South Korea) Kim Soon-Ki
- (South Korea) Jung Kyu-Poong

=== Executive Office ===
- Club Chairman: (South Korea) Lee Yoon-Woo
- Managing Director: (South Korea) Ahn Ki-Hyun

== Honours ==
=== Club ===
- Korean Super Cup Winners
- K-League Cup Winners
- A3 Champions Cup Winners

=== Individual ===
- K-League Best XI: (South Korea) Cho Won-Hee
