= 1998 Suwon Samsung Bluewings season =

Suwon Samsung Bluewings
1998 season
- Head Coach: Kim Ho
- Stadium: Suwon Sports Complex
- K-League: Winners
- FA Cup: Quarterfinals
- League Cup: Adidas: Group A 3rd Philip Morris: 4th
- Cup Winners' Cup: Runners-up
- Top goalscorer: League: All: Saša (8)
Home colours	Away colours

The 1998 Suwon Samsung Bluewings season was Suwon Samsung Bluewings's third season in the K-League in Republic of Korea. Suwon Samsung Bluewings is competing in K-League, League Cup, Korean FA Cup and Asian Cup Winners' Cup.

== Squad ==
Note: Flags indicate national team as defined under FIFA eligibility rules; some limited exceptions apply. Players may hold more than one non-FIFA nationality.

No.	Pos.	Nation	Player
1	GK	KOR	Lee Woon-Jae
2	DF	KOR	Park Choong-Kyun
3	DF	KOR	Lee Byung-Keun
4	DF	KOR	Jung Sung-Hoon (captain)
5	DF	KOR	Shin Sung-Hwan
6	DF	KOR	Lee Ki-Hyung
7	MF	KOR	Kim Jin-woo
8	MF	ROU	Badea
8	FW	YUG	Saša
9	FW	KOR	Lee Jin-Haeng
10	MF	KOR	Cho Hyun-Doo
11	FW	RUS	Denis
12	MF	KOR	Cho Hyun
13	FW	ROU	Mihai
14	DF	KOR	Jeon Jae-Bok
15	DF	KOR	Shin Hong-Gi
16	DF	KOR	Kim Young-Sun
17	FW	KOR	Choi Sung-Ho
18	FW	KOR	Park Kun-Ha
19	MF	ROU	Oli
20	DF	KOR	Lee Sang-Wook
21	GK	KOR	Kim Dae-Hwan

No.	Pos.	Nation	Player
22	MF	KOR	Ko Jong-Su
23	FW	KOR	Hong Sung-Ho
24	DF	KOR	Kim Jae-Sin
25	MF	KOR	Han Sang-Yeol
26	MF	KOR	Oh Yoon-Ki
27	MF	KOR	Kim Eun-Chul
28	FW	KOR	Lee Yong-Woo
29	DF	KOR	Yang Jong-Hoo
30	MF	KOR	Jeon Se-Hwan
31	GK	KOR	Kim Kwang-Soo
32	DF	KOR	Park Jung-Suk
33	FW	KOR	Lee Ho-Kyung
34	FW	KOR	Cho Man-Keun
35	MF	KOR	Jung Yong-Hoon
36	DF	KOR	Shin Seung-In
37	FW	KOR	Kim Young-Ki
38	MF	KOR	Yoon Sung-Hyo
39	DF	KOR	Kang Nam-Gil
40	FW	UKR	Vitaliy
41	FW	KOR	Kim Sang-Hoon
42	DF	KOR	Huh Ki-Tae

== Backroom staff ==
=== Coaching staff ===
- Head coach: (South Korea) Kim Ho
- Assistant coach: (South Korea) Choi Kang-Hee
- Reserve Team Coach: (South Korea) Park Hang-Seo
- Playing Coach: (South Korea) Yoon Sung-Hyo

=== Scouter ===
- (South Korea) Jung Kyu-Poong

== Honours ==
=== Club ===
- K-League Winners

=== Individual ===
- K-League MVP: (South Korea) Ko Jong-Su
- K-League Manager of the Year: (South Korea) Kim Ho
- K-League Best XI: (South Korea) Ko Jong-Su, (Federal Republic of Yugoslavia) Saša
