= 2000 Suwon Samsung Bluewings season =

Suwon Samsung Bluewings
2000 season
- Head Coach: Kim Ho
- Stadium: Suwon Sports Complex
- K-League: 5th
- FA Cup: Quarterfinals
- League Cup: Adidas: Winners; Daehan: Group A 4th
- Club Championship: 4th
- Top goalscorer: League: All: Denis (10)
Home colours	Away colours

The 2000 Suwon Samsung Bluewings season was Suwon Samsung Bluewings's fifth season in the K-League in Republic of Korea. Suwon Samsung Bluewings is competing in K-League, League Cup, Korean FA Cup, Super Cup and Asian Club Championship.

== Squad ==
Note: Flags indicate national team as defined under FIFA eligibility rules; some limited exceptions apply. Players may hold more than one non-FIFA nationality.

No.	Pos.	Nation	Player
1	GK	KOR	Kim Dae-Hwan
2	DF	KOR	Kim Jae-Sin
3	DF	KOR	Lee Byung-Keun
4	DF	KOR	Lee Kyung-Keun
5	DF	KOR	Huh Ki-Tae
6	DF	KOR	Lee Ki-Hyung
7	MF	KOR	Kim Jin-woo
8	FW	YUG	Saša Drakulić
8	FW	COL	Harry
8	FW	NGA	Lucky Isibor
9	MF	KOR	Lee Jin-Haeng
10	FW	ROU	Ion Ionuț Luțu
11	FW	RUS	Denis Laktionov
12	MF	KOR	Cho Hyun-Doo
13	FW	KOR	Lee Ki-Bum
13	FW	BRA	Sandro
14	FW	KOR	Seo Jung-Won
15	DF	KOR	Shin Hong-Gi (captain)
16	DF	KOR	Kim Young-Sun
17	FW	UKR	Vitaliy Parakhnevych
18	FW	KOR	Park Kun-Ha
19	DF	ROU	Cosmin Olăroiu
19	DF	YUG	Zoltan Sabo
20	FW	KOR	Hwang Sun-Hong
20	DF	KOR	Ryu Woong-Yeol
21	GK	KOR	Park Ho-Jin
22	MF	KOR	Ko Jong-Soo

No.	Pos.	Nation	Player
23	MF	KOR	Jang Ji-Hyun
24	MF	KOR	Lee Jae-Chul
25	MF	KOR	Seol Ik-Chan
26	MF	KOR	Kang Dae-Hee
27	MF	KOR	Cho Hyun
28	MF	KOR	Kim Ki-Bum
29	DF	KOR	Yang Jong-Hoo
30	GK	KOR	Shin Bum-Chul
31	GK	KOR	Lee Chang-Deok
32	DF	KOR	Hwang Jung-Man
33	DF	KOR	Lee Sang-Tae
34	DF	KOR	Nam Ki-Sung
35	DF	KOR	Cho Jae-Min
36	DF	KOR	Jung Sung-Won
37	MF	KOR	Lee Kwang-Ho
39	DF	KOR	Lim Se-Jin
40		KOR	Cho Sung-Chan
40	DF	KOR	Lee Dong-Wook
41	GK	KOR	Lee Hee-Young
42	FW	KOR	Lee Kyung-Woo
43	FW	KOR	Cho Jae-Jin
44	MF	KOR	Choi Nam-Chul
45	DF	KOR	Kwak In-Sik
46	FW	KOR	Kim Dae-Hyun
47	DF	KOR	Hwang Sung-Beom
48		KOR	Moon Tae-Hyuk
49	DF	KOR	Min Byung-Keun

== Backroom staff ==
=== Coaching staff ===
Position	Staff
Head Coach	(South Korea) Kim Ho
Assistant Coach	(South Korea) Choi Kang-Hee
Reserve Team Coach	(South Korea) Yoon Sung-Hyo
Scouter	(South Korea) Jung Kyu-Poong
Scouter	(South Korea) Wang Sun-Jae

Last updated: 2012
Source: Suwon Bluewings

== Honours ==
=== Club ===
- Korean Super Cup Winners
- K-League Cup Winners

=== Individual ===
- K-League Cup Top Assistor: (Russia) Denis (4 assists)
- K-League Best XI: (Russia) Denis
