= 2006 Suwon Samsung Bluewings season =

Suwon Samsung Bluewings
2006 season
- Chairman: Lee Yoon-Woo
- Head Coach: Cha Bum-Kun
- Stadium: Big Bird
- K-League: Runners-up
- FA Cup: Runners-up
- League Cup: 12th
- Top goalscorer: League: All: Baek Ji-Hoon (5)
Home colours	Away colours

The 2006 Suwon Samsung Bluewings season was the Suwon Samsung Bluewings' eleventh season in the South Korean K-League. The team competed in the K-League, League Cup and Korean FA Cup.

== Squad ==
Note: Flags indicate national team as defined under FIFA eligibility rules; some limited exceptions apply. Players may hold more than one non-FIFA nationality.

No.	Pos.	Nation	Player
1	GK	KOR	Lee Woon-Jae
2	DF	CRO	Mato Neretljak
3	DF	KOR	Park Ju-Sung
4	DF	KOR	Lee Jung-Soo
5	MF	KOR	Kim Nam-Il (captain)
7	MF	KOR	Kim Jin-woo
8	MF	KOR	Song Chong-Gug
9	FW	URU	Juan Manuel Olivera
10	FW	BRA	Elpídio
11	FW	KOR	Kim Dae-Eui
12	DF	KOR	Moon Min-Kui
13	MF	KOR	Lee Kwan-Woo
14	FW	KOR	Shin Young-Rok
15	DF	KOR	Lee Sa-Vik
16	FW	KOR	Jung Yoon-Sung
17	FW	KOR	Son Jeong-Tak
18	DF	KOR	Park Kun-Ha
19	FW	KOR	Namgung Woong
20	MF	KOR	Baek Ji-Hoon
21	GK	KOR	Kim Dae-Hwan
22	FW	KOR	Lee Hyun-Jin
23	MF	KOR	Cho Won-Hee
24	DF	KOR	Son Seung-Joon
25	MF	KOR	Lee Kil-Hoon

No.	Pos.	Nation	Player
26	MF	KOR	Kim Tae-Jin
27	FW	KOR	Seo Dong-Hyun
28	MF	KOR	Baek Joo-Hyun
29	DF	KOR	Kwak Hee-Ju
30	DF	KOR	Ko Kyung-Joon
31	GK	KOR	Park Ho-Jin
32	DF	KOR	Heo Jae-Won
33	FW	RUS	Denis Laktionov
34	FW	KOR	Lee Sun-Woo
35	MF	KOR	Ha Tae-Keun
36	DF	KOR	Kim Yoon-Goo
37	FW	KOR	Yoon Hwa-Pyung
39	MF	KOR	Kim Hyung-Chul
40	FW	KOR	Kim Sang-Ki
41	GK	KOR	Kwon Ki-Bo
42	DF	KOR	Lee Joon-Young
43	MF	KOR	Han Byung-Yong
44	MF	KOR	Kim Jun
45	GK	KOR	Lee Hyeon-Ho
—	DF	KOR	Cha Keon-Myung
—	MF	KOR	Choi Sung-Hyun
—	FW	KOR	Hwang Mu-Kyu
—	DF	KOR	Han Sang-Min

== Backroom staff ==
=== Coaching staff ===
- Head coach: (South Korea) Cha Bum-Kun
- Assistant coach: (South Korea) Lee Lim-Saeng
- Reserve Team Coach: (South Korea) Choi Man-Hee
- GK Coach: (South Korea) Cho Byung-Deuk
- Physical trainer: (Austria) Richard Fratz

=== Scout ===
- (South Korea) Kim Soon-Ki
- (South Korea) Jung Kyu-Poong

=== Executive Office ===
- Club Chairman: (South Korea) Lee Yoon-Woo
- Managing Director: (South Korea) Ahn Ki-Hyun

== Honours ==
=== Individual ===
- K-League Best XI: (South Korea) Park Ho-Jin, (Croatia) Mato, (South Korea) Lee Kwan-Woo, (South Korea) Baek Ji-Hoon
