= 1999 Suwon Samsung Bluewings season =

Suwon Samsung Bluewings
1999 season
- Head Coach: Kim Ho
- Stadium: Suwon Sports Complex
- K-League: Winners
- FA Cup: Quarterfinals
- League Cup: Adidas: Winners; Daehan: Winners
- Club Championship: 4th
- Top goalscorer: League: All: Saša (23)
Home colours	Away colours

The 1999 Suwon Samsung Bluewings season was Suwon Samsung Bluewings's fourth season in the K-League in Republic of Korea. Suwon Samsung Bluewings is competing in K-League, League Cup, Korean FA Cup, Super Cup and Asian Club Championship.

== Squad ==
Note: Flags indicate national team as defined under FIFA eligibility rules; some limited exceptions apply. Players may hold more than one non-FIFA nationality.

No.	Pos.	Nation	Player
1	GK	KOR	Lee Woon-Jae
2	DF	KOR	Kim Jae-Sin
3	DF	KOR	Lee Byung-Keun
4	DF	KOR	Jung Sung-Hoon
5	DF	KOR	Huh Ki-Tae
6	DF	KOR	Lee Ki-Hyung
7	MF	KOR	Kim Jin-woo
8	FW	YUG	Saša
9	MF	KOR	Lee Jin-Haeng
10	MF	KOR	Cho Hyun-Doo
11	FW	RUS	Denis
12	MF	KOR	Cho Hyun
13	MF	KOR	Jung Yong-Hoon
14	FW	KOR	Seo Jung-Won
15	DF	KOR	Shin Hong-Gi (captain)
16	DF	KOR	Kim Young-Sun
17	FW	UKR	Vitaliy
18	FW	KOR	Park Kun-Ha
19	DF	ROU	Oli
20	DF	KOR	Lee Sang-Wook
21	GK	KOR	Kim Dae-Hwan
22	MF	KOR	Ko Jong-Soo
23	MF	KOR	Kim Dong-Hyun

No.	Pos.	Nation	Player
24	MF	KOR	Lee Jae-Chul
25	MF	KOR	Han Sang-Yeol
26	MF	KOR	Oh Yoon-Ki
27	MF	KOR	Hwang Jung-Man
28	MF	KOR	Kim Ki-Bum
29	DF	KOR	Yang Jong-Hoo
30	FW	KOR	Song Hong-Seob
31	GK	KOR	Park Ho-Jin
32	DF	KOR	Park Jung-Suk
33	FW	KOR	Lee Ho-Kyung
34	MF	KOR	Cho Man-Keun
35	DF	KOR	Jeon Jae-Bok
36	MF	KOR	Jung Sung-Won
37	DF	KOR	Lim Seok-Hwan
39	DF	KOR	Kang Nam-Gil
40	DF	KOR	Ahn Sung-Ho
41	GK	KOR	Lee Hee-Young
42	FW	KOR	Lee Kyung-Woo
43	MF	KOR	Jang Ji-Hyun
44	MF	KOR	Seol Ik-Chan
45	DF	KOR	Lee Kyung-Keun
46	MF	KOR	Cho Jae-Min

== Backroom staff ==
=== Coaching staff ===
Position	Staff
Head Coach	(South Korea) Kim Ho
Assistant Coach	(South Korea) Choi Kang-Hee
Reserve Team Coach	(South Korea) Park Hang-Seo
Trainer	(South Korea) Yoon Sung-Hyo
Scouter	(South Korea) Jung Kyu-Poong

Last updated: 2012
Source: Suwon Bluewings

== Honours ==
=== Club ===
- K-League Winners
- K-League Cup (Adidas Cup) Winners
- K-League Cup (Daehan Fire Cup) Winners
- Korean Super Cup Winners

=== Individual ===
- K-League Manager of the Year: (South Korea) Kim Ho
- K-League Top Scorer: (Federal Republic of Yugoslavia) Saša (23 goals)
- K-League Cup Top Assistor: (Russia) Denis (3 assists)
- K-League Best XI: (South Korea) Lee Woon-Jae, (South Korea) Shin Hong-Gi, (South Korea) Seo Jung-Won, (South Korea) Ko Jong-Soo, (Russia) Denis, (Federal Republic of Yugoslavia) Saša
