= 2004 Suwon Samsung Bluewings season =

Suwon Samsung Bluewings
2004 season
- Chairman: Lee Yoon-Woo
- Head Coach: Cha Bum-Kun
- Stadium: Big Bird
- K-League: Winners
- FA Cup: Round of 16
- League Cup: 4th
- Top goalscorer: League: All: Nádson (14)
Home colours	Away colours

The 2004 Suwon Samsung Bluewings season was Suwon Samsung Bluewings's ninth season in the K-League in Republic of Korea. Suwon Samsung Bluewings is competing in K-League, League Cup and Korean FA Cup.

== Squad ==
Note: Flags indicate national team as defined under FIFA eligibility rules; some limited exceptions apply. Players may hold more than one non-FIFA nationality.

No.	Pos.	Nation	Player
1	GK	KOR	Lee Woon-Jae
2	DF	KOR	Cho Byung-Kuk
3	DF	KOR	Lee Byung-Keun (captain)
4	MF	KOR	Kim Do-Heon
5	DF	KOR	Cho Sung-Hwan
6	DF	ARG	Musa
6	DF	BRA	Cris
7	MF	KOR	Kim Jin-woo
8	MF	KOR	Park Nam-Yeol
9	FW	BRA	Marcel
10	MF	ROU	Gabi
11	FW	KOR	Kim Dae-Eui
12	FW	BRA	Nádson
13	FW	KOR	Cho Jae-Jin
14	FW	KOR	Seo Jung-Won
15	MF	KOR	Kwon Jip
16	DF	KOR	Kim Young-Sun
17	MF	KOR	Son Dae-Ho
18	DF	KOR	Park Kun-Ha
19	FW	KOR	Namgoong Woong
20	DF	KOR	Choi Sung-Yong
21	GK	KOR	Kim Dae-Hwan
22	MF	KOR	Ko Jong-Su
23	DF	KOR	Park Ju-Sung

No.	Pos.	Nation	Player
24	MF	KOR	Oh Kyu-Chan
25	MF	KOR	Kim Dong-Hyun
26	MF	KOR	Ko Chang-Hyun
27	FW	KOR	Kim Dong-Hyun
28	MF	KOR	Kim Ki-Bum
29	DF	KOR	Kwak Hee-Ju
30	MF	KOR	Lee Jong-Min
31		KOR	Shin Woong-Sik
32	MF	KOR	Son Seung-Joon
33	MF	KOR	Lee Sang-Tae
34	MF	KOR	Kim Jun
35	DF	KOR	Cho Jae-Min
36	MF	KOR	Jang Ji-Hyun
37	FW	KOR	Jung Yoon-Sung
39	FW	KOR	Shin Young-Rok
40	FW	KOR	Lee Kyung-Woo
41	GK	KOR	Kwon Ki-Bo
42	DF	KOR	Ryu Ki-Chun
43	DF	KOR	Lee Ki-Hyung
44	MF	SCG	Urumov
45	DF	KOR	Han Sang-Min
46	DF	KOR	Lee Tae-Kwon
47	DF	KOR	Lee Gang-Jin

== Backroom staff ==
=== Coaching staff ===
- Head Coach: (South Korea) Cha Bum-Kun
- Assistant Coach: (Germany) Marco Pezzaiuoli
- Coach: (South Korea) Lee Lim-Saeng
- GK Coach: (South Korea) Cho Byung-Deuk
- Playing Coach: (South Korea) Seo Jung-Won
- Physical Trainer: (South Korea) Lee Chang-Yeop

=== Scouter ===
- (South Korea) Kim Soon-Ki
- (South Korea) Jung Kyu-Poong

=== Executive Office ===
- Club Chairman: (South Korea) Lee Yoon-Woo
- Managing Director: (South Korea) Ahn Ki-Hyun

== Honours ==
=== Club ===
- K-League Winners

=== Individual ===
- K-League MVP: (Brazil) Nádson
- K-League Manager of the Year: (South Korea) Cha Bum-Kun
- K-League Best XI: (South Korea) Lee Woon-Jae, (Argentina) Musa, (South Korea) Kwak Hee-Ju, (South Korea) Kim Do-Heon, (South Korea) Kim Dae-Eui, (Brazil) Nádson
