= 2007 Suwon Samsung Bluewings season =

Suwon Samsung Bluewings
2007 season
- Chairman: Lee Yoon-Woo
- Head Coach: Cha Bum-Kun
- Stadium: Big Bird
- K-League: 2nd (Play-off: 3rd)
- FA Cup: Round of 16
- League Cup: Semifinals
- Top goalscorer: League: All: Nádson (8)
Home colours	Away colours

The 2007 Suwon Samsung Bluewings season was the Suwon Samsung Bluewings' twelfth season in the South Korean K-League. The club competed in the K-League, League Cup and Korean FA Cup.

== Squad ==
Note: Flags indicate national team as defined under FIFA eligibility rules; some limited exceptions apply. Players may hold more than one non-FIFA nationality.

No.	Pos.	Nation	Player
1	GK	KOR	Lee Woon-Jae
2	DF	CRO	Mato Neretljak
3	DF	KOR	Park Ju-Sung
4	DF	KOR	Lee Jung-Soo
5	MF	KOR	Kim Nam-Il
6	MF	KOR	Hong Soon-Hak
7	MF	KOR	Kim Jin-woo
8	MF	KOR	Song Chong-Gug
9	FW	BRA	Edu
10	FW	KOR	Ahn Jung-Hwan
11	FW	KOR	Kim Dae-Eui
12	FW	BRA	Nádson
13	MF	KOR	Lee Kwan-Woo (captain)
14	DF	KOR	Moon Min-Kui
15	DF	KOR	Lee Sa-Vik
16	FW	KOR	Bae Ki-Jong
17	FW	KOR	Park Sung-Bae
18	FW	KOR	Shin Young-Rok
19	FW	KOR	Namgung Woong
20	MF	KOR	Baek Ji-Hoon
21	GK	KOR	Kim Dae-Hwan
22	FW	KOR	Lee Hyun-Jin

No.	Pos.	Nation	Player
23	MF	KOR	Cho Won-Hee
24	DF	KOR	Son Seung-Joon
25	DF	KOR	Choi Sung-Hwan
26	MF	KOR	Kim Tae-Jin
27	FW	KOR	Seo Dong-Hyun
28	FW	KOR	Ha Tae-Goon
29	DF	KOR	Kwak Hee-Ju
30	DF	KOR	Yang Sang-Min
31	GK	KOR	Park Ho-Jin
32	DF	KOR	Lim Yo-Hwan
33	FW	RUS	Denis Laktionov
34	FW	KOR	Lee Sun-woo
35	FW	KOR	Ahn Hyo-yeon
37	MF	KOR	Jung Min-soo
38	MF	KOR	Kim Hyun-seung
39	MF	KOR	Kim Hyun-joon
40	MF	KOR	Choi Chan-yang
41	GK	KOR	Kwon Ki-bo
42	DF	KOR	Kim Seung-hwan
43	MF	KOR	Han Byung-yong
44	FW	KOR	Jung Yoon-sung
45	GK	KOR	Lee Hyeon-ho

== Backroom staff ==
=== Coaching staff ===
- Head coach: (South Korea) Cha Bum-Kun
- Assistant coach: (South Korea) Lee Lim-Saeng
- Coach: (South Korea) Park Kun-Ha
- Reserve Team Coach: (South Korea) Choi Man-Hee
- GK Coach: (South Korea) Cho Byung-Deuk
- Physical trainer: (Austria) Richard Fratz

=== Scouter ===
- (South Korea) Kim Soon-Ki
- (South Korea) Jung Kyu-Poong

=== Executive Office ===
- Club Chairman: (South Korea) Lee Yoon-Woo
- Managing Director: (South Korea) Ahn Ki-Hyun

== Honours ==
=== Individual ===
- K-League Rookie of the Year: (South Korea) Ha Tae-Goon
- K-League Best XI: (Croatia) Mato, (South Korea) Lee Kwan-Woo

== See also ==
- Suwon Bluewings Official website
