= 2008 Suwon Samsung Bluewings season =

Suwon Bluewings
2008 season
- Chairman: Lee Yoon-Woo
- Head Coach: Cha Bum-Kun
- Stadium: Big Bird
- K-League: Winners
- FA Cup: Round of 16
- League Cup: Winners
- Top goalscorer: League: All: Edu (16)
Home colours	Away colours

The 2008 Suwon Samsung Bluewings season was Suwon Samsung Bluewings's thirteenth season in the K-League in Republic of Korea. Suwon Samsung Bluewings is competing in K-League, League Cup and Korean FA Cup.

== Squad ==
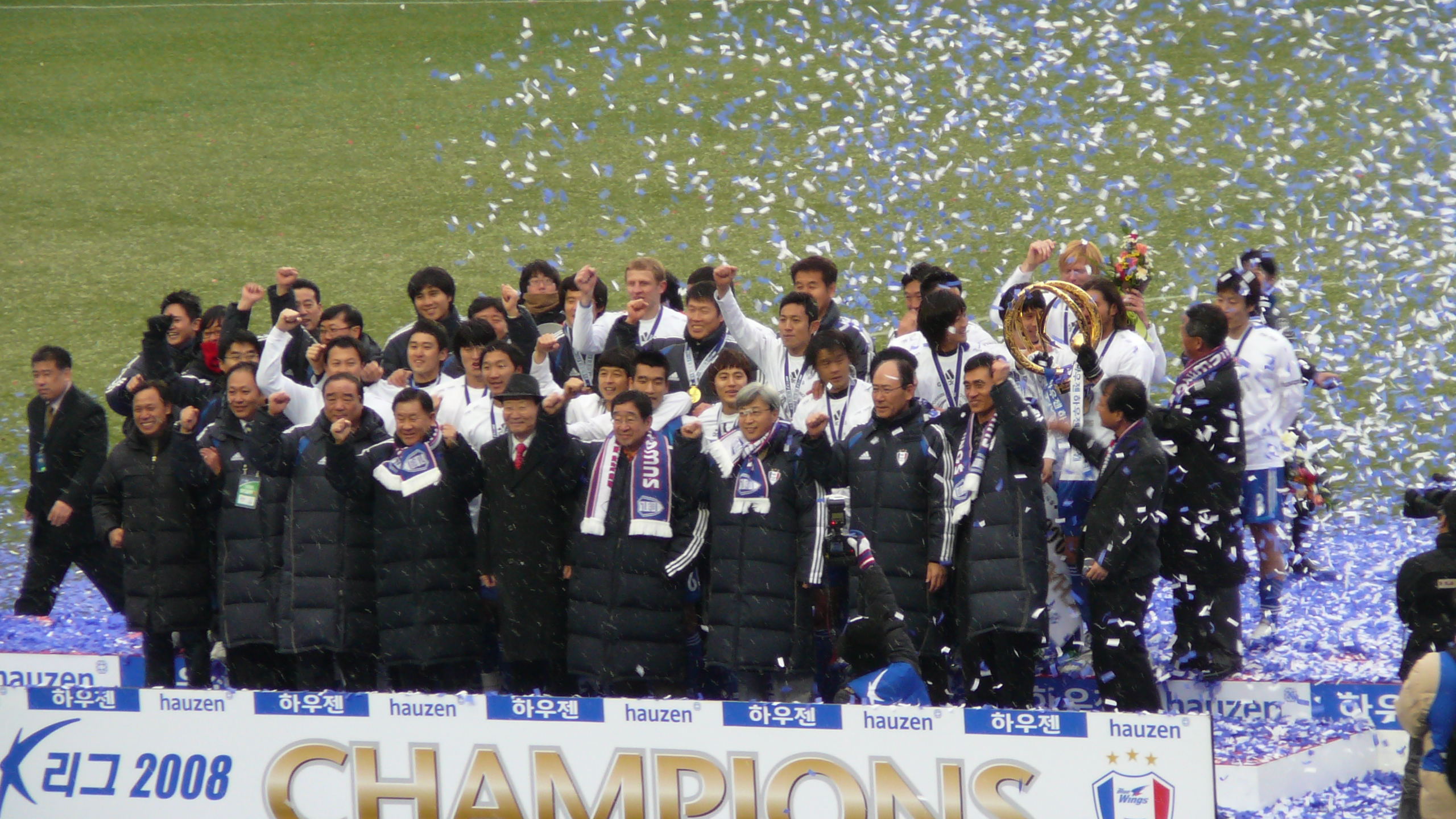
K-League 2008 Season Champions

Note: Flags indicate national team as defined under FIFA eligibility rules; some limited exceptions apply. Players may hold more than one non-FIFA nationality.

No.	Pos.	Nation	Player
1	GK	KOR	Lee Woon-Jae
2	DF	CRO	Mato
3	DF	KOR	Yang Sang-Min
4	DF	KOR	Kim Sung-Keun
5	MF	KOR	Park Hyun-Beom
6	MF	KOR	Cho Won-Hee
7	FW	KOR	Ahn Hyo-Yeon
8	MF	KOR	Song Chong-Gug (captain)
9	FW	BRA	Edu
10	FW	KOR	Ha Tae-Goon
11	FW	KOR	Kim Dae-Eui
12	FW	BRA	Lucas
13	MF	KOR	Lee Kwan-Woo
14	DF	KOR	Lee Jung-Soo
15	MF	KOR	Hong Soon-Hak
16	FW	KOR	Bae Ki-Jong
17	MF	PRK	An Yong-Hak
18	FW	KOR	Shin Young-Rok
19	FW	KOR	Namgung Woong
20	MF	KOR	Baek Ji-Hoon
21	GK	KOR	Kim Dae-Hwan
22	FW	KOR	Lee Hyun-Jin

No.	Pos.	Nation	Player
23	DF	KOR	Park Ju-Sung
24	DF	KOR	Moon Min-Kui
25	DF	KOR	Choi Sung-Hwan
26	FW	BRA	Luiz
27	FW	KOR	Seo Dong-Hyun
28	FW	KOR	Lee Chun-Soo
29	DF	KOR	Kwak Hee-Ju
30	MF	KOR	Choi Sung-Hyun
31	GK	KOR	Park Ho-Jin
32	DF	KOR	Lim Yo-Hwan
33	DF	KOR	Park Tae-Min
34	DF	KOR	Choi Chang-Yong
35	FW	KOR	Cho Yong-Tae
36	DF	KOR	Lee Won-Hong
37	DF	KOR	Ahn Seok-Ho
38	FW	KOR	Hwang Mu-Kyu
39	FW	KOR	Lee Sang-Ha
40	MF	KOR	Choi Chan-Yang
41	GK	KOR	Kwon Ki-Bo
42	DF	KOR	Yoo Yang-Joon
43	MF	KOR	Han Byung-Yong
45	DF	KOR	Han Sang-Min

== Backroom staff ==
=== Coaching staff ===
- Head coach: (South Korea) Cha Bum-Kun
- Assistant coach: (South Korea) Lee Lim-Saeng
- Coach: (South Korea) Park Kun-Ha
- Reserve Team Coach: (South Korea) Choi Man-Hee
- GK Coach: (South Korea) Cho Byung-Deuk
- Physical trainer: (Germany) George Daniel Meyer

=== Scouter ===
- (South Korea) Kim Soon-Ki
- (South Korea) Cho Jae-Min

== Honours ==
=== Club ===
- K-League Winners
- K-League Cup Winners

=== Individual ===
- K-League MVP: (South Korea) Lee Woon-Jae
- K-League Manager of the Year: (South Korea) Cha Bum-Kun
- K-League Best XI: (South Korea) Lee Woon-Jae, (Croatia) Mato, (South Korea) Cho Won-Hee, (Brazil) Edu
