= 2009 Suwon Samsung Bluewings season =

Suwon Bluewings
2009 season
- Chairman: Lee Yoon-Woo
- Head Coach: Cha Bum-Kun
- Stadium: Big Bird
- K-League: 10th
- FA Cup: Winners
- League Cup: Quarterfinals
- Champions League: Round of 16
- Top goalscorer: League: All: Edu (7)
Home colours	Away colours

The 2009 Suwon Samsung Bluewings season was the Suwon Samsung Bluewings' fourteenth season in the South Korean K-League. The club participated in the K-League, League Cup, Korean FA Cup, Pan-Pacific Championship and the Champions League as the winners of the previous year's K-League.

== Squad ==
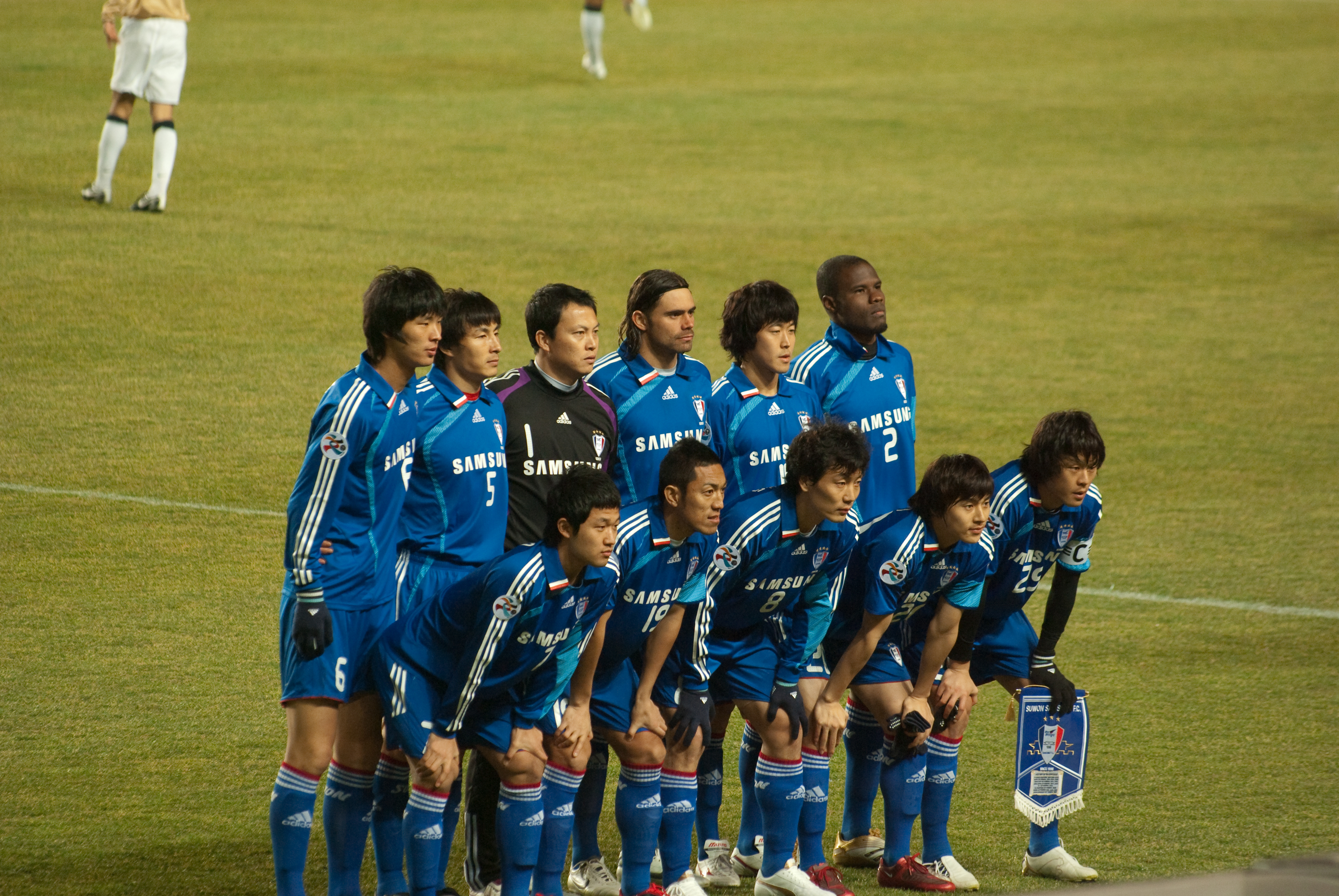
ACL 2009 squad vs Kashima Antlers

Note: Flags indicate national team as defined under FIFA eligibility rules; some limited exceptions apply. Players may hold more than one non-FIFA nationality.

No.	Pos.	Nation	Player
1	GK	KOR	Lee Woon-Jae
2	DF	BRA	Jorge Luiz
2	DF	KOR	Lee Jae-Seong
3	DF	KOR	Yang Sang-Min
4	MF	KOR	Kim Do-Heon
5	DF	CHN	Li Weifeng
6	MF	KOR	Park Hyun-Beom
7	FW	KOR	Lee Sang-ho
8	MF	KOR	Song Chong-Gug
9	FW	BRA	Edu
10	FW	KOR	Ha Tae-Goon
11	FW	KOR	Namgung Woong
12	FW	KOR	Lee Hyun-Jin
13	MF	KOR	Lee Kwan-Woo
14	DF	KOR	Kim Dae-Gun
15	MF	KOR	Hong Soon-Hak
16	FW	KOR	Bae Ki-Jong
17	MF	PRK	An Yong-Hak
18	FW	KOR	Cho Yong-Tae
19	FW	KOR	Kim Dae-Eui
20	MF	KOR	Baek Ji-Hoon
21	GK	KOR	Kim Dae-Hwan

No.	Pos.	Nation	Player
22	MF	KOR	Lee Kil-Hoon
23	FW	BRA	Tiago
24	MF	KOR	Kim Hong-Il
25	DF	KOR	Choi Sung-Hwan
26	FW	BRA	Sandro Hiroshi
27	FW	KOR	Seo Dong-Hyun
29	DF	KOR	Kwak Hee-Ju (captain)
30	MF	KOR	Choi Sung-Hyun
31	GK	KOR	Park Ho-Jin
32	DF	KOR	Kim Seon-Il
33	DF	KOR	Park Tae-Min
34	FW	KOR	Baek Joo-Hyun
35	DF	KOR	Kim Yoon-Goo
36	MF	KOR	Choi Jae-Pil
37	DF	KOR	Ahn Seok-Ho
38	DF	KOR	Heo Jae-Won
39	FW	KOR	Lee Sang-Ha
41	GK	KOR	Park Ji-Young
42	DF	KOR	Yoo Yang-Joon
43	DF	KOR	Lee Seung-Won
44	MF	KOR	Moon Min-Kui
45	MF	KOR	Kim Hyun-Seung

== Backroom staff ==
=== Coaching staff ===
- Head coach: (South Korea) Cha Bum-Kun
- Assistant coach: (South Korea) Lee Lim-Saeng
- Coach: (South Korea) Kim Jin-woo
- Reserve Team Coach: (South Korea) Choi Man-Hee
- GK Coach: (South Korea) Cho Byung-Deuk
- Physical trainer: (Germany) George Daniel Meyer

=== Scouter ===
- (South Korea) Kim Soon-Ki
- (South Korea) Hwang Deuk-Ha

== Honours ==
=== Club ===
- Korean FA Cup Winners
- Pan-Pacific Championship Winners

=== Individual ===
- Korean FA Cup MVP: (South Korea) Lee Woon-Jae
