= Jeong Dong-yun =

South Korean footballer (born 1994)

Personal information
- Date of birth: 3 April 1994 (age 32)
- Place of birth: South Korea
- Height: 1.74 m (5 ft 8 1/2 in)
- Position: Full back

Team information
- Current team: Suwon Samsung Bluewings
- Number: 32

Youth career
- 2013–2015: Sungkyunkwan University

Senior career*
Years	Team	Apps	(Gls)
2016–2018	Gwangju FC	55	(0)
2018–2021	Incheon United	40	(1)
2021-2022	Gimcheon Sangmu	14	(0)
2023–2024	Incheon United	61	(0)
2025–	Suwon Samsung Bluewings	22	(0)
- * Club domestic league appearances and goals as of 5 August 2026

Jeong Dong-yun (Korean: 정동윤; born 3 April 1994) is a South Korean footballer who plays as full back for Suwon Samsung Bluewings in K League 2.

== Career ==
He joined K League Classic side Gwangju FC in January 2016.
