= Park Chul-woo =

South Korean footballer (born 1965)

Park Chul-Woo 박철우
Personal information
- Date of birth: 29 September 1965 (age 61)
- Place of birth: South Korea
- Height: 1.85 m (6 ft 1 in)
- Position: Goalkeeper

Team information
- Current team: South Korea U20

Youth career
- Honam University

Senior career*
Years	Team	Apps	(Gls)
1985–1991	POSCO Atoms	41	(0)
1992–1994	LG Cheetahs	54	(0)
1995	Chunnam Dragons	10	(0)
1996–1997	Suwon Samsung Bluewings	31	(0)
1998–1999	Chunnam Dragons	31	(0)
Total		167	(0)

International career
1994	South Korea	2	(0)

Managerial career
- 2001–2002: Chunnam Dragons (Coach)
- 2003–2005: Pohang Steelers (Coach)
- 2007: Daekyo Kangaroos WFC (Coach)
- 2008: Gyeongnam FC (Coach)
- 2012–: South Korea U20 (Coach)
- * Club domestic league appearances and goals

Park Chul-Woo (born 29 September 1965) is a South Korean football goalkeeping coach and former player. A goalkeeper, he played in K-League side POSCO Atoms, LG Cheetahs, Chunnam Dragons, and Suwon Samsung Bluewings in South Korea.

== Career statistics ==
Appearances and goals by club, season and competition
Club	Season	League			KFA Cup		Korean League Cup		Asia		Total	
Club	Season	Division	Apps	Goals	Apps	Goals	Apps	Goals	Apps	Goals	Apps	Goals
POSCO Atoms	1985	K-League	11	0	–		–		–		11	1
POSCO Atoms	1986	K-League	2	0	–		1	0	–		3	0
POSCO Atoms	1987	K-League	0	0	–		–		–		0	0
POSCO Atoms	1988	K-League	0	0	–		–		–		0	0
POSCO Atoms	1989	K-League	0	0	–		–		–		0	0
POSCO Atoms	1990	K-League	0	0	–		–		–		0	0
POSCO Atoms	1991	K-League	28	0	–		–		–		28	0
LG Cheetahs	1992	K-League	10	0	–		3	0	–		13	0
LG Cheetahs	1993	K-League	24	0	–		5	0	–		29	0
LG Cheetahs	1994	K-League	20	0	–		0	0	–		20	0
Chunnam Dragons	1995	K-League	10	0	–		1	0	–		11	0
Suwon Samsung Bluewings	1996	K-League	20	0			2	0	–			
Suwon Samsung Bluewings	1997	K-League	11	0			8	0				
Chunnam Dragons	1998	K-League	15	0			0	0				
Chunnam Dragons	1999	K-League	16	0			3	0				
Career total			167	0			23	0				
