= Lee Yeo-sung =

South Korean footballer (born 1983)

Lee Yeo-Sung
Personal information
- Full name: Lee Yeo-Sung (이여성)
- Date of birth: January 5, 1983 (age 43)
- Place of birth: Incheon, South Korea
- Height: 1.79 m (5 ft 10 in)
- Position: Midfielder

Senior career*
Years	Team	Apps	(Gls)
2002–2005	Suwon Samsung Bluewings	3	(0)
2003–2004	→ Police (army)		
2006–2007	Busan I'Park	35	(1)
2008–2009	Daejeon Citizen	26	(1)
2010–	Goyang KB		
- * Club domestic league appearances and goals

Lee Yeo-Sung (born January 5, 1983) is a South Korean football player who since 2008 has played for Goyang KB Kookmin Bank FC (Suwon Samsung Bluewings, Busan I'Park and Daejeon Citizen).
