= Cossa (footballer) =

Brazilian goalie coach and former footballer

Personal information
- Full name: Marco Antonio Alvarez Ferreira
- Date of birth: 20 July 1964 (age 62)
- Place of birth: Santos, Brazil
- Height: 1.86 m (6 ft 1 in)
- Position: Goalkeeper

Team information
- Current team: Santo André (interim)

Youth career
- 1979: Santos

Senior career*
Years	Team	Apps	(Gls)
1981	Jabaquara		
1982–1985	Portuguesa Santista		
1986–1987	Juventus-SP		
1987	Portuguesa Santista		
1988–1989	Juventus-SP		
1990	Nacional-SP		
1991	XV de Piracicaba		
1991–1993	Juventus-SP		
1994	Portuguesa Santista		
1995	São Bento		
1996	Fortaleza		
1996	Confiança		

International career
1986–1987	Brazil U23		

Managerial career
- 2008: Persepolis (assistant)
- 2016: Buriram United (assistant)
- 2018–2019: Foolad (assistant)
- 2025: Vancouver FC (assistant)
- 2026–: Santo André (assistant)
- 2026–: Santo André (interim)
- * Club domestic league appearances and goals

Marco Antonio Alvarez Ferreira (born 20 July 1964), commonly known as Cossa, is a Brazilian football coach and former player who played as a goalkeeper. He is the current interim head coach of Santo André.

Cossa attended the 2004 Summer Olympics.

== Playing career ==
He played for the following clubs: Santos (1979), Jabaquara (1981), Portuguesa Santista (1983–1985, 1994), Juventus-SP (1987), Nacional (1990), XV de Piracicaba (1991), São Bento (1995), Fortaleza (1996) and Confiança (1996).

== Coaching career ==
He is a former Portuguesa Santista goalkeeper coach, and he has become the goalkeeper coach of South Korea national football team when Pim Verbeek was hired to be the head coach of the team. He has been coaching as goalkeeper coach in several countries such as Iran FC Persepolis, UAE Al Dhafra FC, Japan Shimizu S-Pulse, Thailand Buriram United F.C. and China Shijiazhuang Ever Bright F.C., under Afshin Ghotbi
