= Suwon Samsung Bluewings =

Association football club in South Korea

- Full name: Suwon Samsung Bluewings Football Club 수원 삼성 블루윙즈 축구단
- Nicknames: Cheong-Baek-Jeok; Korean: 청백적 (The Blue, White and Reds); Tricolor
- Founded: 1995; 31 years ago
- Ground: Suwon World Cup Stadium
- Capacity: 44,031
- Owner: Cheil Worldwide
- Chairman: Lee Jun
- Head coach: Lee Jung-hyo
- League: K League 2
- 2025: K League 2, 2nd of 14
- Website: www.bluewings.kr
Home colours	Away colours	Third colours

The Suwon Samsung Bluewings (Korean: 수원 삼성 블루윙즈) are a South Korean football club based in Suwon that competes in the K League 2, the second tier of the South Korean professional football league system. Founded in December 1995, they have won the K League on four occasions (1998, 1999, 2004 and 2008), as well as the Asian Club Championship twice, in 2000–01 and 2001–02.

== History ==
The club was formally founded on 15 December 1995 by Samsung Electronics, becoming the ninth member of the K League from the 1996 season. It was also the first club to be founded in one specific city, a plan which led to the K League initiating plans to encourage its other clubs to forge similar links with local communities.

Former South Korean national team manager Kim Ho took charge of the side from their first season in the K League, and the team finished runners-up in the championship play-off that season. The championship was secured in 1998 and retained in 1999 as Suwon started to dominate Korean football.

Suwon lifted the Asian Club Championship twice in succession in 2000–01 and 2001–02, and also added the Asian Super Cup to their roll of honours on two occasions, in 2001 and 2002.

In the 2002 season, Suwon also won the Korean FA Cup for the first time, achieving a continental double.

The departure of Kim Ho in 2003 saw Korean football legend Cha Bum-kun appointed manager ahead of the 2004 season, and the club won its third league title in his debut season as manager.

Suwon finished runners-up in both major domestic competitions in 2006, as Seongnam Ilhwa Chunma claimed victory in the K League championship play-off final and Chunnam Dragons won in the FA Cup final, thwarting Suwon's attempts to win the first ever domestic double in South Korean football.

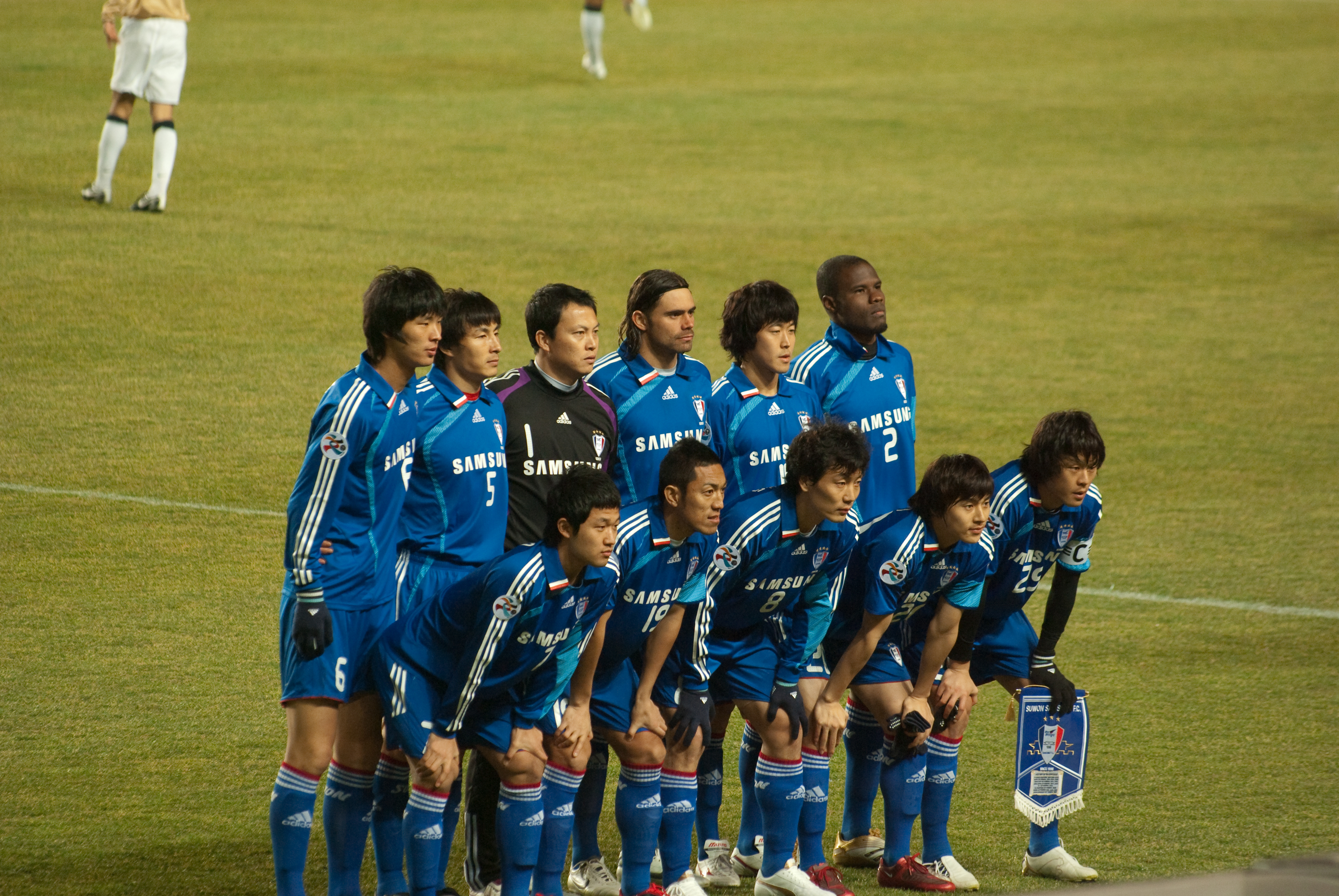
Suwon's squad in the 2009 AFC Champions League

The 2008 season became one of the most successful seasons in the club's history. Suwon achieved a domestic double by winning the K League Championship and the League Cup.

After the appointment of coach Seo Jung-won in 2013, the team started focusing on financial self-sufficiency and reducing expenditures, marking a shift away from reliance on generous support from its parent company Samsung Electronics, with ownership eventually being transferred to Cheil Worldwide, a Samsung affiliate. The club began transitioning from being a "team that wins by effectively utilizing the parent company's budget" to "a team that generates its own revenue and maintains appropriate performance."

Despite failing to win another domestic or continental title, the club continued to be a force in South Korea and Asia, finishing as K League runners-up in the 2014 and 2015 seasons, as well as reaching the semi-finals of the 2018 AFC Champions League. Suwon's last major honour came in 2019, winning the Korean FA Cup and qualifying for the 2020 AFC Champions League.

Major financial changes at the club led to poor results, and in the 2023 season, the club was relegated to the second-tier K League 2 for the first time in its history after finishing last.

After failing to be promoted for two seasons in a row, the Bluewings hired Gwangju FC manager Lee Jung-hyo to manage the club. In the club's first game with him at the helm, the opening game of the 2026 K League 2 season, they defeated Seoul E-Land 2–1 at home and set a new K League 2 attendance record of over 24,000.

== Crest and colours ==
=== Crest ===
The current crest has been used by the Bluewings since 2008. It depicts the Hwaseong Fortress, a UNESCO World Heritage Site and a prominent symbol of the city of Suwon. The wing on the top of the crest is the club's first crest and symbolises their will to rise to the sky [sic] of world football.

=== Colours ===
The Bluewings' colours are blue, red and white. Blue is the colour of Samsung and also symbolises youth and hope. Red is the symbol of bravery, passion, challenge, vitality and dynamism. White represents benevolence, purity and fair play.

== Stadium ==
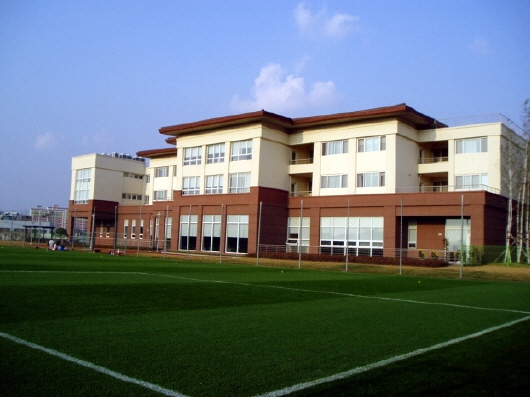
The club house (training ground) of Suwon Samsung Bluewings

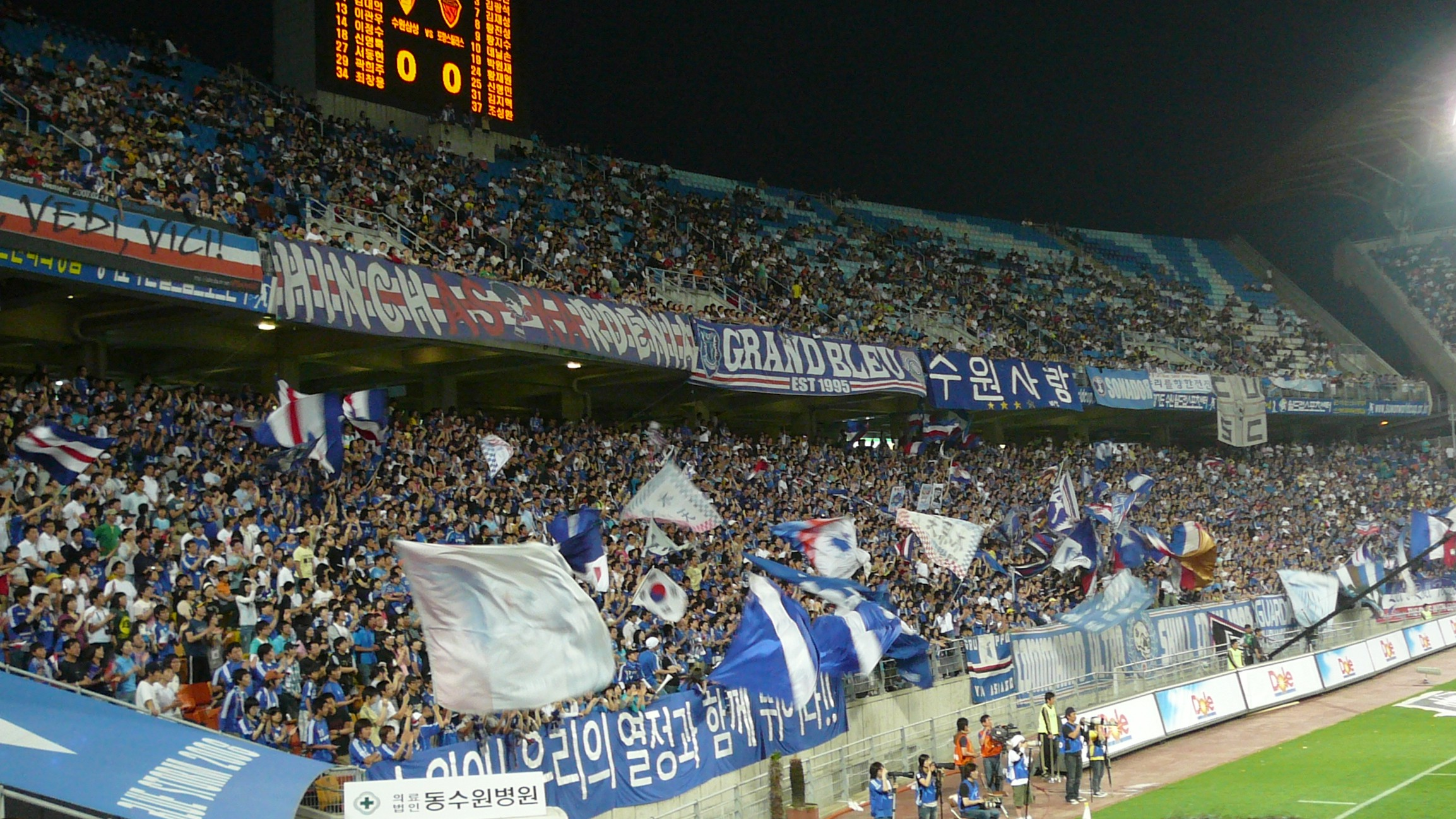
The Frente Tricolor supporters' group, formerly known as Grand Bleu, at the Suwon World Cup Stadium

The Suwon Samsung Bluewings used the 11,808-seat Suwon Sports Complex as their home stadium from 1995 through 2001.

Samsung began building the Suwon World Cup Stadium, the current home of the Bluewings, in 1996, but construction stopped in 1998 due to the 1997 Asian financial crisis. With the support of the city of Suwon and Gyeonggi Province, the stadium was completed in May 2001. It was used as a venue for the 2002 FIFA World Cup. Based on the shape of the roof of the stadium, fans sometimes call the stadium the "Big Bird".

The Bluewings' training ground is located in Dongtan, a district of Hwaseong.

== Supporters and rivalries ==
Frente Tricolor (청백적 전선, 靑白赤 戰線) is the official Suwon Samsung Bluewings supporters group. The group is known for its fanatical support for the club, especially versus its major rivals, which has sometimes led to violent incidents between Suwon supporters and rival fans.

The club's official theme song is "My Love, My Suwon" by the South Korean punk rock band No Brain. It is based on the song "Little Baby", released in 2003, and Suwon fans sang it by changing the lyrics.

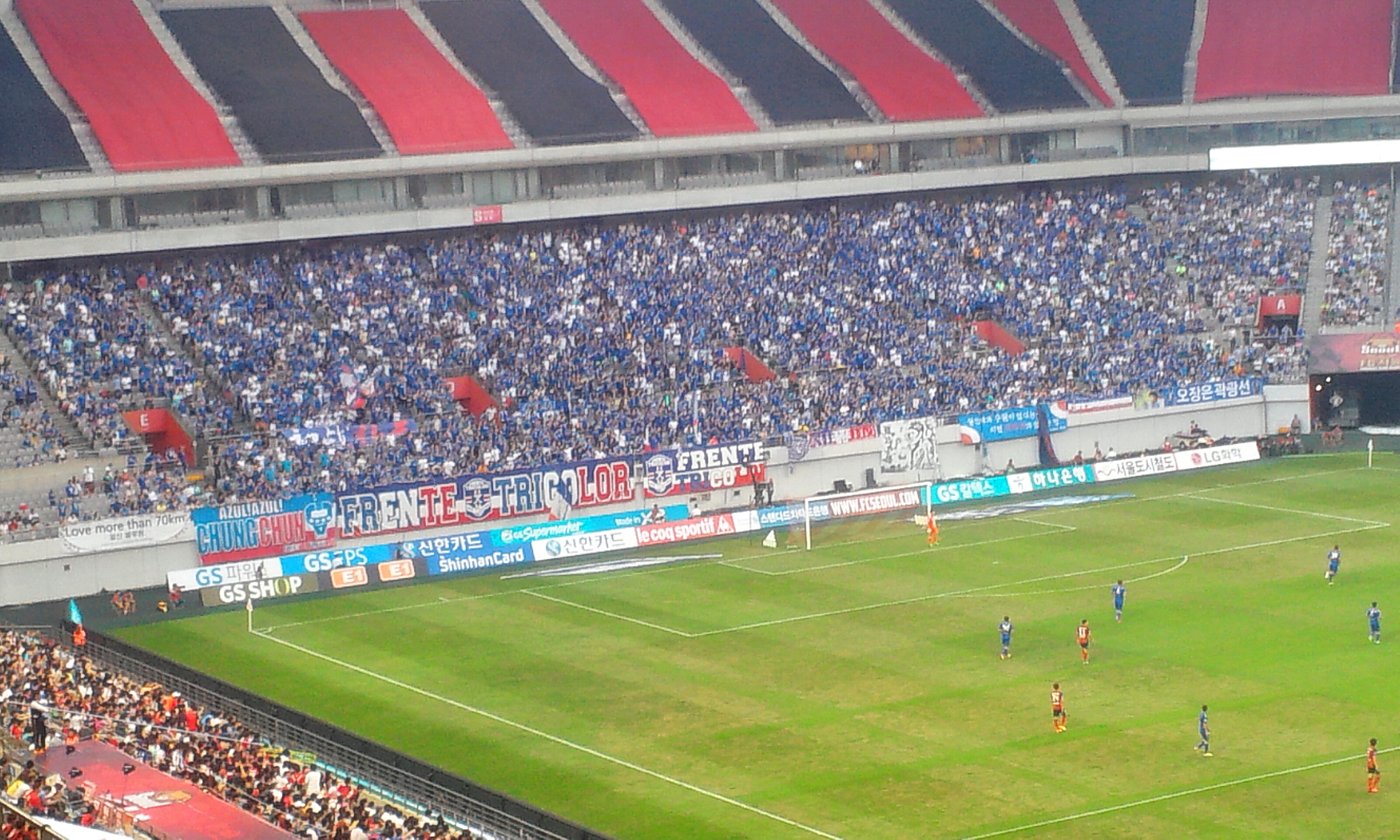
Suwon supporters in the Super Match at Seoul World Cup Stadium

The club shares its fiercest rivalry with FC Seoul in a derby dubbed the Super Match. The origins of the derby come from when FC Seoul was based in the city of Anyang, where its previous parent company LG had a major presence. The derby was not only a rivalry between the cities of Anyang and Suwon, but one between Samsung and LG, two of the largest electronics companies in South Korea. The rivalry has continued since FC Seoul's relocation to Seoul. The derby now represents a rivalry between Seoul, the largest city in South Korea, and Suwon, the capital of Gyeonggi Province, the most populous administrative unit in South Korea that surrounds Seoul.

The club also shares rivalries with other major clubs in the Seoul Capital Area, including cross-town Suwon FC (Suwon Derby), FC Anyang (Jijidae Derby), Incheon United (Suin Derby), and Seongnam FC (Magye Derby), although its rivalry with Seongnam has weakened since Seongnam has declined as a major force in the K League.

== Players ==
=== Current squad ===
As of 8 October 2026

Note: Flags indicate national team as defined under FIFA eligibility rules; some limited exceptions apply. Players may hold more than one non-FIFA nationality.

No.	Pos.	Nation	Player
1	GK	KOR	Kim Min-jun
3	DF	KOR	Mo Gyeong-bin
4	DF	KOR	Song Ju-hun (vice-captain)
5	DF	KOR	Ko Jong-hyun
6	MF	KOR	Lim Ji-hoon
7	FW	BRA	Fessin
8	FW	SMN	Keelan Lebon
10	MF	BRA	Reis
11	DF	KOR	Lee Jun-jae
13	DF	KOR	Yeo Min-jun
14	MF	KOR	Jeong Ho-yeon (on loan from Minnesota United)
15	DF	KOR	Jung Sung-min
16	MF	KOR	Park Hyun-bin
17	MF	KOR	Kang Hyun-muk
18	DF	KOR	Choi Ji-mook
19	MF	KOR	Kim Seong-ju
20	DF	KOR	Hong Jeong-ho (captain)
21	GK	KOR	Yang Hyung-mo
22	FW	KOR	Kang Seong-jin
23	MF	KOR	Kim Min-woo (on loan from Daejeon Hana Citizen)

No.	Pos.	Nation	Player
24	MF	KOR	Ko Seung-beom
27	DF	KOR	Lee Geon-hee
28	DF	KOR	Yoon Geun-yeong
30	GK	KOR	Kim Joon-hong
31	GK	KOR	Lee Gyeong-jun
32	DF	KOR	Jeong Dong-yun
33	DF	KOR	Park Dae-won (vice-captain)
37	FW	KOR	Kim Ju-chan
42	MF	KOR	Lee Jun-woo
44	DF	KOR	Hong Sang-won
58	FW	BRA	Bruno Silva
66	DF	KOR	Han Hyeon-seo
70	FW	COL	Luis Mina
71	FW	KOR	Kim Ji-ho
77	FW	KOR	Kim Ji-hyeon
80	MF	KOR	Kim Ji-sung
90	FW	KOR	Kim Gyeol
92	FW	KOR	Lee Sang-min
98	FW	LTU	Edgaras Dubickas
99	FW	KOR	Kim Do-yeon

=== Out on loan ===
Note: Flags indicate national team as defined under FIFA eligibility rules; some limited exceptions apply. Players may hold more than one non-FIFA nationality.

No. / Pos. / Nation / Player; — / DF / KOR / Jang Seok-hwan (at Gwangju FC)	No. / Pos. / Nation / Player; — / FW / KOR / Park Ji-won (at Gimcheon Sangmu for military service)

=== Club captains ===
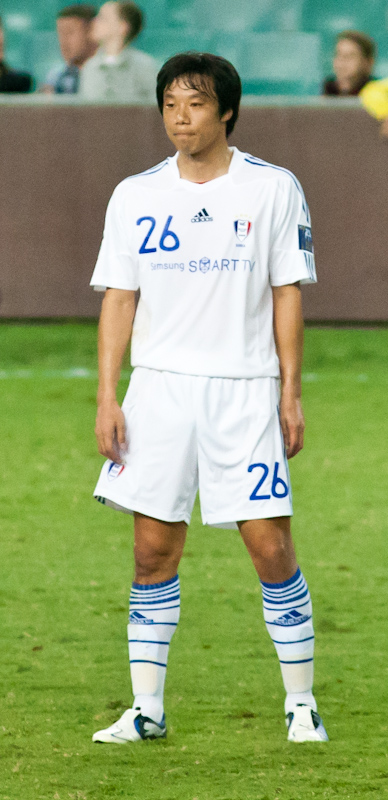
Yeom Ki-hun is the most capped player and top goalscorer in the club's history.

Year	Captains	Vice-captain(s)
1996	(South Korea) Kim Doo-ham	(South Korea) Yoon Sung-hyo
1997	(South Korea) Shin Sung-hwan	
1998	(South Korea) Jung Sung-hoon	
1999	(South Korea) Shin Hong-gi	
2000	(South Korea) Shin Hong-gi	
2001	(South Korea) Park Kun-ha	(South Korea) Kim Jin-woo
2002	(South Korea) Seo Jung-won	(South Korea) Park Kun-ha
2003	(South Korea) Kim Jin-woo	(South Korea) Lee Woon-jae
2004	(South Korea) Lee Byung-keun	(South Korea) Kim Young-sun
2005	(South Korea) Choi Sung-yong	(South Korea) Kim Dae-eui
2006	(South Korea) Kim Nam-il	(South Korea) Cho Jae-min
2007	(South Korea) Lee Kwan-woo	(South Korea) Lee Jung-soo
2008	(South Korea) Song Chong-gug	(South Korea) Kim Dae-eui (South Korea) Kwak Hee-ju
2009	(South Korea) Kwak Hee-ju (South Korea) Lee Woon-jae	(South Korea) Hong Soon-hak
2010	(South Korea) Cho Won-hee	(South Korea) Kim Dae-eui (South Korea) Kim Do-heon
2011	(South Korea) Choi Sung-kuk (South Korea) Yeom Ki-hun	(South Korea) Yeom Ki-hun (Croatia) Mato Neretljak
2012	(South Korea) Kwak Hee-ju	(South Korea) Oh Beom-seok
2013	(South Korea) Kim Do-heon	(South Korea) Oh Jang-eun
2014	(South Korea) Yeom Ki-hun	(South Korea) Oh Jang-eun
2015	(South Korea) Yeom Ki-hun	(South Korea) Kim Eun-sun
2016	(South Korea) Yeom Ki-hun	(South Korea) Hong Chul (South Korea) Shin Se-gye
2017	(South Korea) Yeom Ki-hun	(South Korea) Koo Ja-ryong (South Korea) Lee Jong-sung
2018	(South Korea) Kim Eun-sun	(South Korea) Choi Sung-keun
2019	(South Korea) Yeom Ki-hun	(South Korea) Choi Sung-keun (South Korea) Hong Chul
2020	(South Korea) Yeom Ki-hun	(South Korea) Choi Sung-keun (South Korea) Kim Min-woo
2021	(South Korea) Kim Min-woo	(South Korea) Min Sang-gi
2022	(South Korea) Min Sang-gi	(South Korea) Choi Sung-keun (South Korea) Han Seok-jong
2023	(South Korea) Lee Ki-je	(South Korea) Ko Seung-beom
2024	(South Korea) Yang Hyung-mo	(Japan) Kazuki Kozuka (South Korea) Cho Yoon-sung (South Korea) Kim Ju-chan (South Korea) Lee Jong-sung (South Korea) Park Dae-won
2025	(South Korea) Yang Hyung-mo	(South Korea) Choi Young-jun (South Korea) Han Ho-gang (South Korea) Jeong Dong-yun (Russia) Stanislav Iljutcenko
2026	(South Korea) Hong Jeong-ho	(South Korea) Song Ju-hun (South Korea) Park Dae-won

=== Notable players ===
Hall of Fame
(South Korea) Seo Jung-won (1999–2004)
(South Korea) Park Kun-ha (1996–2006)
(South Korea) Lee Woon-jae (1996–2011)
(South Korea) Lee Byung-keun (1996–2006)
(South Korea) Kim Jin-woo (1996–2007)
(South Korea) Ko Jong-soo (1996–2004)
(Russia) Denis Laktionov (1996–2003, 2006–2007)
(Brazil) Sandro (2000–2002, 2005–2007)
(Brazil) Nádson (2003–2008)
(South Korea) Kwak Hee-ju (2003–2013, 2015–2016)
(Brazil) Natanael Santos (2013–2017)
(South Korea) Yang Sang-min (2007–2022)
(South Korea) Yeom Ki-hun (2010–2023)

Greatest ever team (10th anniversary)

In the spring of 2005, as part of the club's celebration of its 10th anniversary, Suwon fans voted for the best players in the club's history. The players who received the most votes in each position were named in the club's greatest ever team.

- Goalkeeper

(South Korea) Lee Woon-jae (1996–2011)

- Defenders

(South Korea) Park Kun-ha (1996–2006)
(South Korea) Choi Sung-yong (2002–2006)
(South Korea) Lee Byung-keun (1996–2006)

- Midfielders

(South Korea) Ko Jong-soo (1996–2004)
(Russia) Denis Laktionov (1996–2003, 2006–2007)
(South Korea) Kim Do-heon (2001–2005, 2009–2014)
(South Korea) Seo Jung-won (1999–2004)
(South Korea) Kim Jin-woo (1996–2007)

- Forwards

(Brazil) Nádson (2003–2008)
(Serbia and Montenegro) Saša Drakulić (1998–2000)

Greatest ever team (20th anniversary)

In the spring of 2015, as part of the club's celebration of its 20th anniversary, Suwon fans voted for the best players in the club's history. The players who received the most votes in each position were named in the club's greatest ever team.

- Goalkeeper

(South Korea) Lee Woon-jae (1996–2011)

- Defenders

(South Korea) Choi Sung-yong (2002–2006)
(Croatia) Mato Neretljak (2005–2008, 2011)
(South Korea) Lee Byung-keun (1996–2006)
(South Korea) Kwak Hee-ju (2003–2013, 2015–2016)

- Midfielders

(Russia) Denis Laktionov (1996–2003, 2006–2007)
(South Korea) Ko Jong-soo (1996–2004)
(South Korea) Kim Jin-woo (1996–2007)
(South Korea) Seo Jung-won (1999–2004)

- Forwards

(South Korea) Park Kun-ha (1996–2006)
(Brazil) Nádson (2003–2008)

== Honours ==
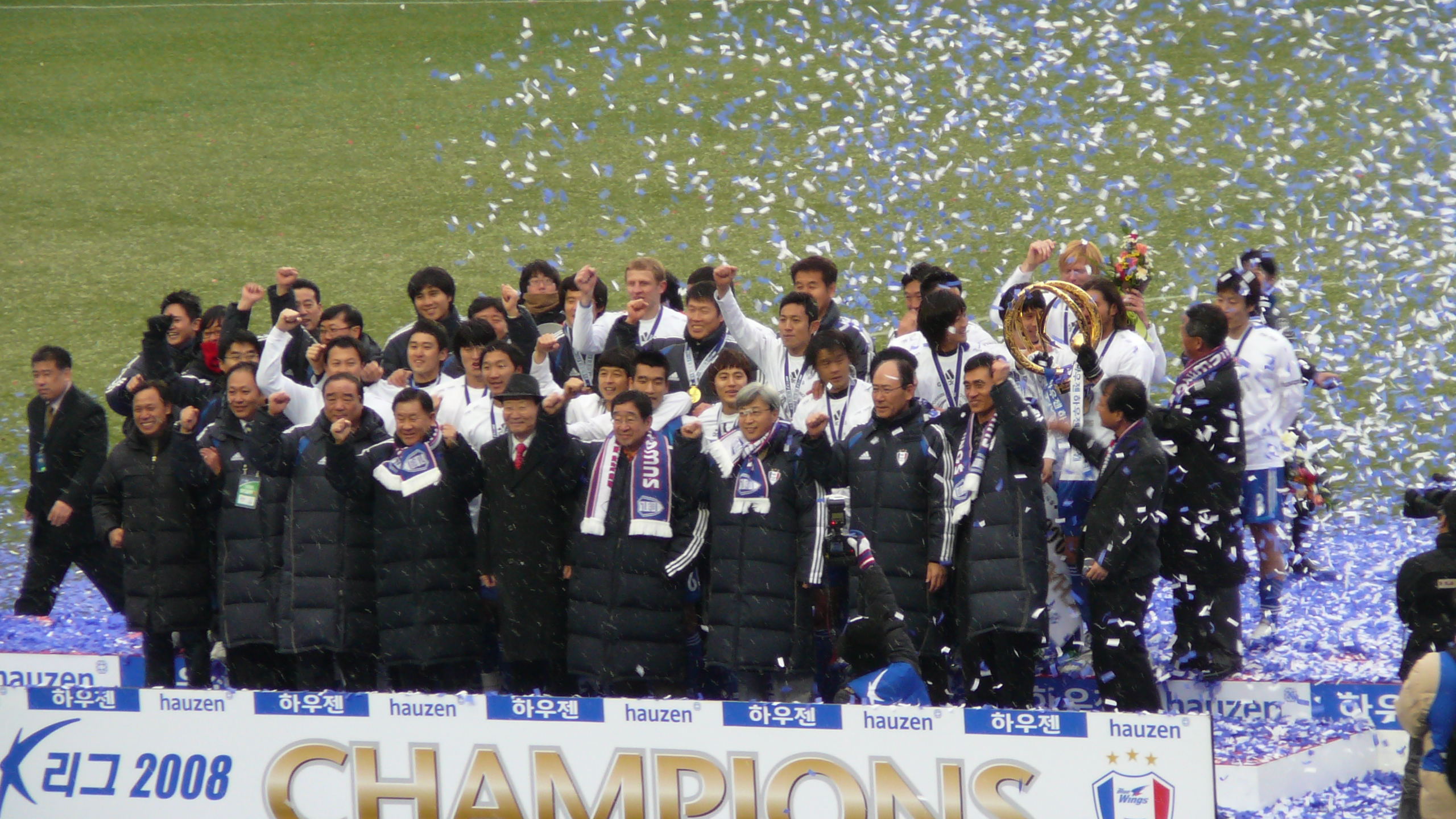
Suwon Samsung Bluewings players celebrating after winning the 2008 K League

=== Domestic ===
- K League 1
  - Winners (4): 1998, 1999, 2004, 2008
  - Runners-up (4): 1996, 2006, 2014, 2015
- K League 2
  - Winners (1): 2026
  - Runners-up (1): 2025
- Korean FA Cup
  - Winners (5): 2002, 2009, 2010, 2016, 2019
  - Runners-up (3): 1996, 2006, 2011
- Korean League Cup
  - Winners (6): 1999, 1999s, 2000, 2001, 2005, 2008
- Korean Super Cup
  - Winners (3): 1999, 2000, 2005

=== International ===
- Asian Club Championship
  - Winners (2): 2000–01, 2001–02
- Asian Cup Winners' Cup
  - Runners-up (1): 1997–98
- Asian Super Cup
  - Winners (2): 2001, 2002
- A3 Champions Cup
  - Winners (1): 2005

== Records ==
=== Season-by-season record ===
Season	Division	Teams	Position	Pld	W	D	L	GF	GA	GD	Pts	League Cup	Korean Cup	Super Cup	AFC	Other	Manager
1996	1	9	Runners-up	32	18	9	5	57	33	+24	63	6th (A)	Runners-up				(South Korea) Kim Ho
1997	1	10	5th	18	7	7	4	23	23	0	28	6th (A); 3rd (P)	Quarter-final		Runners-up (CW)		(South Korea) Kim Ho
1998	1	10	Champions	20	13	1	6	34	22	+12	35	6th (A); 4th (PM)	Quarter-final				(South Korea) Kim Ho
1999	1	10	Champions	29	23	0	6	60	26	+34	64	Winners (A); Winners (D)	First round	Winners	4th (CC)		(South Korea) Kim Ho
2000	1	10	5th	27	14	0	13	48	43	+5	36	Winners (A); 8th (D)	Quarter-final	Winners			(South Korea) Kim Ho
2001	1	10	3rd	27	12	5	10	40	35	+5	41	Winners (A)	First round		Champions (CC); Winners (SC)		(South Korea) Kim Ho
2002	1	10	3rd	27	12	9	6	40	26	+14	45	4th (A)	Winners		Champions (CC); Winners (SC)		(South Korea) Kim Ho
2003	1	12	3rd	44	19	15	10	59	46	+13	72	No competition	Round of 32	No competition			(South Korea) Kim Ho
2004	1	13	Champions	27	14	6	7	32	24	+8	46	4th (S)	Round of 16				(South Korea) Cha Bum-kun
2005	1	13	10th	24	6	10	8	29	32	–3	28	Winners (S)	Round of 16	Winners	Winners (A3); Group E 2nd (CL)		(South Korea) Cha Bum-kun
2006	1	14	Runners-up	29	12	10	7	31	25	+6	46	12th (S)	Runners-up				(South Korea) Cha Bum-kun
2007	1	14	3rd	27	15	6	6	36	25	+11	51	Semi-final (S)	Round of 16	Competition ceased			(South Korea) Cha Bum-kun
2008	1	14	Champions	28	18	4	6	49	26	+23	58	Winners (S)	Round of 16	Competition ceased			(South Korea) Cha Bum-kun
2009	1	15	10th	28	8	8	12	29	32	–3	32	Quarter-final (PK)	Winners	Competition ceased	Round of 16 (CL)	Winners (PP)	(South Korea) Cha Bum-kun
2010	1	15	7th	28	12	5	11	39	44	–5	41	Semi-final (PC)	Winners	Competition ceased	Quarter-final (CL)	Runners-up (ST)	(South Korea) Cha Bum-kun (South Korea) Yoon Sung-hyo
2011	1	16	4th	30	17	4	9	51	33	+18	55	Semi-final (RC)	Runners-up	Competition ceased	Semi-final (CL)		(South Korea) Yoon Sung-hyo
2012	1	16	4th	44	20	13	11	61	51	+10	73	Competition ceased	Quarter-final	Competition ceased			(South Korea) Yoon Sung-hyo
2013	1	14	5th	38	15	8	15	50	43	+7	53	Competition ceased	Round of 16	Competition ceased	Group H, 4th (CL)		(South Korea) Seo Jung-won
2014	1	12	Runners-up	38	19	10	9	52	37	+15	67	Competition ceased	Round of 32	Competition ceased			(South Korea) Seo Jung-won
2015	1	12	Runners-up	38	19	10	9	60	43	+17	67	Competition ceased	Round of 32	Competition ceased	Round of 16 (CL)		(South Korea) Seo Jung-won
2016	1	12	7th	38	10	18	10	56	59	–3	48	Competition ceased	Winners	Competition ceased	Group G, 3rd (CL)		(South Korea) Seo Jung-won
2017	1	12	3rd	38	17	13	8	63	41	+22	64	Competition ceased	Semi-final	Competition ceased	Group G, 3rd (CL)		(South Korea) Seo Jung-won
2018	1	12	6th	38	13	11	14	53	54	–1	50	Competition ceased	Semi-final	Competition ceased	Semi-final (CL)		(South Korea) Seo Jung-won (South Korea) Lee Byung-keun (C) (South Korea) Seo Jung-won
2019	1	12	8th	38	12	12	14	46	49	–3	48	Competition ceased	Winners	Competition ceased			(South Korea) Lee Lim-saeng
2020	1	12	8th	27	8	7	12	27	30	–3	31	Competition ceased	Quarter-final	Competition ceased	Quarter-final (CL)		(South Korea) Lee Lim-saeng (South Korea) Ju Seung-jin (C) (South Korea) Park Kun-ha
2021	1	12	6th	38	12	10	16	42	50	–8	46	Competition ceased	Quarter-final	Competition ceased			(South Korea) Park Kun-ha
2022	1	12	10th	38	11	11	16	44	49	–5	44	Competition ceased	Quarter-final	Competition ceased			(South Korea) Park Kun-ha (South Korea) Lee Byung-keun
2023	1	12	12th ▼	38	8	9	21	35	57	–22	33	Competition ceased	Quarter-final	Competition ceased			(South Korea) Lee Byung-keun (South Korea) Choi Sung-yong (C) (South Korea) Kim Byung-soo (South Korea) Yeom Ki-hun (C)
2024	2	13	6th	36	15	11	10	46	35	+11	56	Competition ceased	Round of 16	Competition ceased			(South Korea) Yeom Ki-hun (South Korea) Byun Sung-hwan
2025	2	14	2nd	39	20	12	7	76	50	+26	72	Competition ceased	Third round	Competition ceased			(South Korea) Byun Sung-hwan

- K League Championship results are not counted.
- The 1998, 1999 and 2000 seasons had penalty shoot-outs instead of draws.
- A – Adidas Cup, P – Pro-Specs Cup, PM – Philip Morris Cup, D – Daehan Fire Insurance Cup, S – Samsung Hauzen Cup, PK – Peace Cup Korea, PC – Posco Cup, RC – Rush & Cash Cup
  CW – Asian Cup Winners Cup, CC – Asian Club Championship, SC – Asian Super Cup, CL – AFC Champions League, A3 – A3 Champions Cup, PP – Pan-Pacific Championship, ST – Saitama City Cup

=== AFC Champions League record ===
All results (home and away) list Suwon's goal tally first.

Season	Round	Opposition	Home	Away	Agg.
2005	Group E	(Vietnam) Hoang Anh Gia Lai	6–0	5–1	2nd
2005	Group E	(China) Shenzhen Jianlibao	0–0	0–1	2nd
2005	Group E	(Japan) Júbilo Iwata	2–1	1–0	2nd
2009	Group G	(Japan) Kashima Antlers	4–1	0–3	2nd
2009	Group G	Singapore Armed Forces	3–1	2–0	2nd
2009	Group G	(China) Shanghai Shenhua	2–1	1–2	2nd
2009	Round of 16	(Japan) Nagoya Grampus	—N/a	1–2	—N/a
2010	Group G	(Japan) Gamba Osaka	0–0	1–2	1st
2010	Group G	Singapore Armed Forces	6–2	2–0	1st
2010	Group G	(China) Henan Jianye	2–0	2–0	1st
2010	Round of 16	(China) Beijing Guoan	2–0	—N/a	—N/a
2010	Quarter-final	(South Korea) Seongnam Ilhwa Chunma	2–0	1–4	3–4
2011	Group H	(Australia) Sydney FC	3–1	0–0	1st
2011	Group H	(China) Shanghai Shenhua	4–0	3–0	1st
2011	Group H	(Japan) Kashima Antlers	1–1	1–1	1st
2011	Round of 16	(Japan) Nagoya Grampus	2–0	—N/a	—N/a
2011	Quarter-final	(Iran) Zob Ahan	1–1	2–1 (a.e.t.)	3–2
2011	Semi-final	(Qatar) Al-Sadd	0–2	1–0	1–2
2013	Group H	(Australia) Central Coast Mariners	0–1	0–0	4th
2013	Group H	(China) Guizhou Renhe	0–0	2–2	4th
2013	Group H	(Japan) Kashiwa Reysol	2–6	0–0	4th
2015	Group G	(Japan) Urawa Red Diamonds	2–1	2–1	2nd
2015	Group G	(China) Beijing Guoan	1–1	0–1	2nd
2015	Group G	(Australia) Brisbane Roar	3–1	3–3	2nd
2015	Round of 16	(Japan) Kashiwa Reysol	2–3	2–1	4–4 (a)
2016	Group G	(Japan) Gamba Osaka	0–0	2–1	3rd
2016	Group G	(China) Shanghai SIPG	3–0	1–2	3rd
2016	Group G	(Australia) Melbourne Victory	1–1	0–0	3rd
2017	Group G	(Japan) Kawasaki Frontale	0–1	1–1	3rd
2017	Group G	(China) Guangzhou Evergrande	2–2	2–2	3rd
2017	Group G	(Hong Kong) Eastern	5–0	1–0	3rd
2018	Play-off	(Vietnam) Thanh Hóa	5–1	—N/a	—N/a
2018	Group H	(Australia) Sydney FC	1–4	2–0	1st
2018	Group H	(Japan) Kashima Antlers	1–2	1–0	1st
2018	Group H	(China) Shanghai Shenhua	1–1	2–0	1st
2018	Round of 16	(South Korea) Ulsan Hyundai	3–0	0–1	3–1
2018	Quarter-final	(South Korea) Jeonbuk Hyundai Motors	0–3 (a.e.t.)	3–0	3–3 (4–2 p)
2018	Semi-final	(Japan) Kashima Antlers	3–3	2–3	5–6
2020	Group G	(China) Guangzhou Evergrande	0–0 (Note: Played at a neutral venue.)	1–1	2nd
2020	Group G	(Japan) Vissel Kobe	0–1	2–0	2nd
2020	Round of 16	(Japan) Yokohama F. Marinos	3–2		—N/a
2020	Quarter-final	(Japan) Vissel Kobe	1–1 (a.e.t.) (6–7 p)		—N/a

== Player statistics ==
=== Top scorers by seasons ===
Season	Name	Goals
1996	(South Korea) Park Kun-ha	7
1997	(South Korea) Cho Hyun-doo	7
1998	(Serbia and Montenegro) Saša Drakulić	8
1999	(Serbia and Montenegro) Saša Drakulić	23
2000	(Russia) Denis Laktionov	10
2001	(Brazil) Sandro Cardoso	17
2002	(Brazil) Sandro Cardoso	10
2003	(Brazil) Nádson	14
2004	(Brazil) Nádson	14
2005	(Croatia) Mato Neretljak	10
2006	(South Korea) Baek Ji-hoon	5
2007	(Brazil) Nádson	8
2008	(Brazil) Edu	16
2009	(Brazil) Edu	7
2010	(Brazil) José Mota	11
2011	(North Macedonia) Stevica Ristić	9
2012	(Montenegro) Dženan Radončić	14

Season	Name	Goals
2013	(North Korea) Jong Tae-se	10
2014	(Brazil) Natanael Santos	14
2015	(Brazil) Natanael Santos	12
2016	(Brazil) Natanael Santos	12
2017	(Brazil) Johnathan	22
2018	(Montenegro) Dejan Damjanović	13
2019	(Australia) Adam Taggart	20
2020	(Australia) Adam Taggart	9
2021	(Serbia) Uroš Đerić (South Korea) Kim Gun-hee (South Korea) Jeong Sang-bin (South Korea) Kim Min-woo	6
2022	(South Korea) Oh Hyeon-gyu	13
2023	(South Korea) Kim Ju-chan (North Korea) An Byong-jun	5
2024	(Brazil) Paulo Henrique (Serbia) Fejsal Mulić	10
2025	(Brazil) Matheus Serafim (Russia) Stanislav Iljutcenko	13

=== Award winners ===
The following players have won awards while at Suwon Samsung Bluewings:

Domestic

- K League MVP Award
  - (South Korea) Ko Jong-soo (1998)
  - (Brazil) Nádson (2004)
  - (South Korea) Lee Woon-jae (2008)
- K League Top Scorer Award
  - (Serbia and Montenegro) Saša Drakulić (1999)
  - (Brazil) Sandro (2004)
  - (Brazil) Natanael Santos (2014)
  - (Brazil) Johnathan (2017)
  - (Australia) Adam Taggart (2019)
- K League Top Assists Award
  - (Russia) Denis Laktionov (1999)
  - (South Korea) Yeom Ki-hun (2015, 2016)
  - (South Korea) Lee Ki-je (2022)
- K League Best XI
  - (South Korea) Yoon Sung-Hyo (1996)
  - (Romania) Pavel Badea (1996)
  - (South Korea) Lee Jin-Haeng (1998)
  - (South Korea) Ko Jong-Soo (1998, 1999)
  - (South Korea) Lee Woon-Jae (1999, 2002, 2004, 2008)
  - (South Korea) Shin Hong-Gi (1999)
  - (South Korea) Seo Jung-Won (1999, 2001, 2002)
  - (Russia) Denis Laktionov (1999, 2000)
  - (Federal Republic of Yugoslavia) Saša Drakulić (1998, 1999)
  - (Brazil) Sandro Cardoso (2001)
  - (Argentina) Javier Martín Musa (2004)
  - (South Korea) Kwak Hee-Ju (2004)
  - (South Korea) Kim Do-Heon (2004)
  - (Brazil) Nádson (2004)
  - (South Korea) Cho Won-Hee (2005, 2008)
  - (South Korea) Park Ho-Jin (2006)
  - (Croatia) Mato Neretljak (2006, 2007, 2008)
  - (South Korea) Lee Kwan-Woo (2006, 2007)
  - (Brazil) Edu (2008)
  - (South Korea) Yeom Ki-hun (2011, 2015, 2017)
  - (South Korea) Hong Chul (2014, 2015, 2018, 2019)
  - (Brazil) Natanael Santos (2014)
  - (South Korea) Kwon Chang-hoon (2015, 2016)
  - (Brazil) Johnathan (2017)
  - (Australia) Adam Taggart (2019)
  - (South Korea) Lee Ki-je (2021)
- K League Young Player of the Year
  - (South Korea) Park Kun-ha (1996)
  - (South Korea) Ha Tae-kyun (2007)
- Korean FA Cup MVP Award
  - (South Korea) Seo Jung-won (2002)
  - (South Korea) Lee Woon-jae (2009)
  - (South Korea) Yeom Ki-hun (2010, 2016)
  - (South Korea) Ko Seung-beom (2019)
- Korean FA Cup Top Scorer Award
  - (Russia) Denis Laktionov (1996)
  - (South Korea) Yeom Ki-hun (2019)

International

- AFC Champions League Top Scorer
  - (Brazil) José Mota (2010)
- AFC Champions League MVP Award
  - (Serbia and Montenegro) Zoltan Sabo (2000–01)
- AFC Champions League BEST XI
  - (Montenegro) Dejan Damjanović (2018)
- A3 Champion Cup Top Scorer
  - (Brazil) Nádson (2005)
- A3 Champions Cup MVP
  - (Brazil) Nádson (2005)

=== World Cup players ===
The following players have represented their country at the FIFA World Cup whilst playing for Suwon Samsung Bluewings:

World Cup 1998

- (South Korea) Ko Jong-soo

World Cup 2002

- (South Korea) Lee Woon-jae
- (South Korea) Choi Sung-yong

World Cup 2006

- (South Korea) Lee Woon-jae
- (South Korea) Song Chong-gug
- (South Korea) Cho Won-hee
- (South Korea) Kim Nam-il

World Cup 2010

- (South Korea) Lee Woon-jae
- (South Korea) Yeom Ki-hun

World Cup 2014

- (South Korea) Jung Sung-ryong

World Cup 2018

- (Australia) Matthew Jurman

=== Olympic players ===
The following players have represented their country at the Summer Olympic Games whilst playing for Suwon Samsung Bluewings:

1996

- (South Korea) Ko Jong-soo
- (South Korea) Lee Kyung-soo
- (South Korea) Lee Ki-hyung

2000

- (South Korea) Ko Jong-soo

2004

- (South Korea) Cho Byung-kuk
- (South Korea) Kim Do-heon

2008

- (South Korea) Baek Ji-hoon
- (South Korea) Shin Young-rok

2012

- (South Korea) Jung Sung-ryong

2016

- (South Korea) Kwon Chang-hoon

2020

- (South Korea) An Chan-gi
- (South Korea) Kwon Chang-hoon

== Managers ==
No.	Name	From	To	Season(s)	Honours
1	(South Korea) Kim Ho	22 February 1995	October 2003	1996–2003	1998 K League; 1999 K League; 2000–01 Asian Club Championship; 2001–02 Asian Club Championship; 2002 Korean FA Cup
2	(South Korea) Cha Bum-kun	17 October 2003	6 June 2010	2004–2010	2004 K League; 2008 K League; 2009 Korean FA Cup
3	(South Korea) Yoon Sung-hyo	15 June 2010	12 December 2012	2010–2012	2010 Korean FA Cup
4	(South Korea) Seo Jung-won	12 December 2012; 15 October 2018	28 August 2018; 2 December 2018	2013–2018; 2018	2016 Korean FA Cup
C	(South Korea) Lee Byung-keun	28 August 2018	15 October 2018	2018	
5	(South Korea) Lee Lim-saeng	3 December 2018	17 July 2020	2019–2020	2019 Korean FA Cup
C	(South Korea) Ju Seung-jin	17 July 2020	8 September 2020	2020	
6	(South Korea) Park Kun-ha	8 September 2020	15 April 2022	2020–2022	
7	(South Korea) Lee Byung-keun	18 April 2022	17 April 2023	2022–2023	
C	(South Korea) Choi Sung-yong	18 April 2023	5 May 2023	2023	
8	(South Korea) Kim Byung-soo	6 May 2023	26 September 2023	2023	
C	(South Korea) Yeom Ki-hun	26 September 2023	2 December 2023	2023	
9	(South Korea) Yeom Ki-hun	9 January 2024	25 May 2024	2024	
10	(South Korea) Byun Sung-hwan	31 May 2024	7 December 2025	2024–2025	
11	(South Korea) Lee Jung-hyo	24 December 2025	present	2026–	2026 K League 2
