= Pavel Badea =

Romanian footballer

Personal information
- Date of birth: 10 June 1967 (age 59)
- Place of birth: Craiova, Romania
- Height: 1.72 m (5 ft 8 in)
- Position: Midfielder

Youth career
- 1974–1984: Universitatea Craiova

Senior career*
Years	Team	Apps	(Gls)
1984–1992	Universitatea Craiova	202	(43)
1992–1995	Lausanne-Sport	100	(12)
1995–1996	Universitatea Craiova	19	(4)
1996–1998	Suwon Samsung Bluewings	80	(11)
1998–1999	Bellmare Hiratsuka	23	(5)
1999	Kashiwa Reysol	19	(0)
2000–2001	Avispa Fukuoka	58	(8)
2001–2002	Extensiv Craiova	13	(6)
2002–2004	Universitatea Craiova	37	(5)
Total		551	(94)

International career
1990–1992	Romania	9	(2)

Managerial career
- 2003: Universitatea Craiova (player coach)
- 2004–2005: Universitatea Craiova
- * Club domestic league appearances and goals

Pavel Badea (born 10 June 1967) is a Romanian former professional footballer who played as a midfielder. He professionally in Romania, Switzerland, South Korea and Japan.

== Playing career ==
Badea began his professional football career with Universitatea Craiova, making his league debut in 1984. He left Romania to play for Lausanne-Sport of Switzerland in the summer of 1992, later moving to South Korea to play for Suwon Samsung Bluewings from 1996 to 1998. He spent the next several seasons in Japan playing for Bellmare Hiratsuka, Kashiwa Reysol and Avispa Fukuoka in the J1 League. He returned to Romania in December 2001, where he finished his career with FC Extensiv Craiova and Universitatea Craiova.

Badea made nine appearances for the senior Romania national team from 1990 to 1992.

== Coaching career ==
Badea managed Universitatea Craiova for seven league matches during 2003. He returned for a second spell at the club in the 2004–05 season.

== Playing statistics ==
=== Club ===
Appearances and goals by club, season and competition
Club	Season	League			National cup (Note: Includes Cupa României, Schweizer Cup, Korean FA Cup, Emperor's Cup.)		League cup (Note: Includes Cupa Ligii, Korean League Cup, J.League Cup.)		Total	
Club	Season	Division	Apps	Goals	Apps	Goals	Apps	Goals	Apps	Goals
Universitatea Craiova	1983–84	Divizia A	1	0					1	0
Universitatea Craiova	1984–85	Divizia A	0	0					0	0
Universitatea Craiova	1985–86	Divizia A	24	1					24	1
Universitatea Craiova	1986–87	Divizia A	23	4					23	4
Universitatea Craiova	1987–88	Divizia A	34	9					34	9
Universitatea Craiova	1988–89	Divizia A	29	4					29	4
Universitatea Craiova	1989–90	Divizia A	31	8					31	8
Universitatea Craiova	1990–91	Divizia A	31	10					31	10
Universitatea Craiova	1991–92	Divizia A	29	7					29	7
Universitatea Craiova	Total		202	43					202	43
Lausanne-Sport	1992–93	Nationalliga A	35	4					35	4
Lausanne-Sport	1993–94	Nationalliga A	30	1					30	1
Lausanne-Sport	1994–95	Nationalliga A	35	7					35	7
Lausanne-Sport	Total		100	12					100	12
Universitatea Craiova	1995–96	Divizia A	19	4					19	4
Suwon Samsung Bluewings	1996	K-League	32	4					32	4
Suwon Samsung Bluewings	1997	K-League	33	3					33	3
Suwon Samsung Bluewings	1998	K-League	15	4					15	4
Suwon Samsung Bluewings	Total		80	11					80	11
Bellmare Hiratsuka	1998	J1 League	9	1	1	1	0	0	10	2
Bellmare Hiratsuka	1999	J1 League	14	4	0	0	2	0	16	4
Bellmare Hiratsuka	Total		23	5	1	1	2	0	26	6
Kashiwa Reysol	1999	J1 League	19	0	4	0	5	0	28	0
Avispa Fukuoka	2000	J1 League	28	4	2	0	2	2	32	6
Avispa Fukuoka	2001	J1 League	30	4	1	1	2	0	33	5
Avispa Fukuoka	Total		58	8	3	1	4	2	65	11
Extensiv Craiova	2001–02	Divizia B	13	6					13	6
Universitatea Craiova	2002–03	Divizia A	26	4					26	4
Universitatea Craiova	2003–04	Divizia A	11	1					11	1
Universitatea Craiova	Total		37	5					37	5
Career total			551	94	8	2	51	8	570	98

=== International ===
Appearances and goals by national team and year
National team	Year	Apps	Goals
Romania	1990	3	1
Romania	1991	4	0
Romania	1992	2	1
Total		9	2

== Honours ==
Universitatea Craiova

- Romanian League: 1990–91
- Romanian Cup: 1990–91

Suwon Samsung Bluewings

- K League 1: 1998; runner-up 1996
- Korean FA Cup runner-up: 1996
- Asian Cup Winners' Cup runner-up: 1997–98

Kashiwa Reysol

- J.League Cup: 1999

Individual

- K League Best XI: 1996

== Bibliography ==
- Dobre, Ilie (2003). Pavel Badea - "Samuraiul" de pe Jii. Editura Paralela 45. ISBN 973-593-751-4.
