= Seo Dong-hyeon =

South Korean footballer (born 1985)

Seo Dong-hyeon 서동현
Personal information
- Date of birth: 5 June 1985 (age 41)
- Place of birth: Hongcheon, Gangwon, South Korea
- Height: 1.88 m (6 ft 2 in)
- Position: Forward

Team information
- Current team: Gyeongju KHNP
- Number: 99

Youth career
- 2004–2005: Konkuk University

Senior career*
| Years | Team | Apps | (Gls) |
| 2006–2010 | Suwon Samsung Bluewings | 63 | (15) |
| 2010–2011 | Gangwon FC | 38 | (7) |
| 2012–2018 | Jeju United | 71 | (18) |
| 2014–2015 | → Ansan Police (army) | 49 | (13) |
| 2016 | → Daejeon Citizen (loan) | 8 | (1) |
| 2016–2018 | → Suwon FC (loan) | 35 | (6) |
| 2018 | Chiangmai | 12 | (6) |
| 2019 | Kasetsart | 17 | (9) |
| 2019– | Gyeongju KHNP | 66 | (43) |

International career^{‡}
| 2007–2008 | South Korea U23 | 4 | (0) |
| 2008–2013 | South Korea | 5 | (0) |
- * Club domestic league appearances and goals as of 19 March 2022 ‡ National team caps and goals as of 24 July 2013

Seo Dong-hyeon (Korean: 서동현; born 5 June 1985) is a South Korean football player for K3 League club Gyeongju KHNP. His nickname is 'Rainmaker'.

== Early life ==
Seo Dong-hyeon was born in Gangwon-do, South Korea on 5 June 1985. He lived and went to school in Yeonpyeong, South Korea before moving to Seoul and attending Konkuk University. He was picked by the Suwon Samsung Bluewings in the first round of the 2005 K-League draft.

== Club career ==
In his first year with the Suwon Samsung Bluewings in 2006, Seo made 26 appearances and scored 2 goals. Most of his appearances came as a substitute but he was able to impress Suwon Samsung Bluewings manager Cha Bum-Kun enough to say that the youngster "has a long future at this club".

However, in 2007 he made it to the pitch only 12 times this year due to an ankle injury that took 6 months to heal. In his few appearances, he was able to net 4 goals and continued to show great improvement.

The 2008 season marked a breakthrough in Seo Dong-hyeon's career. With Suwon Samsung Bluewings seeking a striker to strengthen their attack, Seo emerged as a key contributor. He scored 11 goals in 21 appearances during the first half of the season.

In July 2010, he moved to Gangwon FC.

In November 2011, he was traded from Gangwon to Jeju United for forward Kim Eun-Jung.

On 21 July 2005, he scored his first career hat-trick in a 6–0 victory over Chunnam.

== International career ==
Seo made his debut for the South Korea national football team in a friendly at home to Jordan on 5 September 2008, coming on for the final 15 minutes and going close to scoring in added time.

== Career statistics ==
=== Club ===
As of 21 July 2012

| Club performance | | | League | | Cup | | League Cup | | Continental | | Total | |
| Season | Club | League | Apps | Goals | Apps | Goals | Apps | Goals | Apps | Goals | Apps | Goals |
| South Korea | | | League | | KFA Cup | | League Cup | | Asia | | Total | |
|---|---|---|---|---|---|---|---|---|---|---|---|---|
| 2006 | Suwon Samsung Bluewings | K-League | 14 | 2 | 2 | 1 | 12 | 0 | - | | 28 | 3 |
| 2007 | Suwon Samsung Bluewings | K-League | 8 | 2 | 1 | 1 | 4 | 2 | - | | 13 | 5 |
| 2008 | Suwon Samsung Bluewings | K-League | 23 | 9 | 2 | 0 | 12 | 4 | - | | 37 | 13 |
| 2009 | Suwon Samsung Bluewings | K-League | 14 | 0 | 4 | 0 | 1 | 0 | 6 | 1 | 25 | 1 |
| 2010 | Suwon Samsung Bluewings | K-League | 9 | 2 | 1 | 0 | 3 | 0 | 4 | 0 | 17 | 2 |
| 2010 | Gangwon FC | K-League | 13 | 5 | 0 | 0 | 0 | 0 | - | | 13 | 5 |
| 2011 | Gangwon FC | K-League | 25 | 2 | 2 | 0 | 3 | 2 | - | | 30 | 4 |
| 2012 | Jeju United | K-League | 22 | 9 | 2 | 1 | - | | - | | 24 | 10 |
| Total | South Korea | | 128 | 31 | 14 | 3 | 35 | 8 | 10 | 1 | 186 | 43 |
| Career total | | | 128 | 31 | 14 | 3 | 35 | 8 | 10 | 1 | 186 | 43 |

Sporting positions
| Preceded by Chung Kyung-Ho | Gangwon FC captain 2011 | Succeeded by Lee Eul-Yong |
