= Sandro (footballer, born 1980) =

Brazilian footballer

Personal information
- Full name: Sandro Cardoso dos Santos
- Date of birth: March 22, 1980 (age 46)
- Place of birth: São Paulo, São Paulo, Brazil
- Height: 1.82 m (5 ft 11 1/2 in)
- Position: Forward

Senior career*
Years	Team	Apps	(Gls)
1998–2000	Portuguesa		
2000–2002	Suwon Samsung Bluewings	52	(25)
2003–2004	JEF United Ichihara	45	(17)
2005–2007	Suwon Samsung Bluewings	41	(6)
2007	→ Chunnam Dragons (loan)	4	(1)
2007–2008	Changsha Ginde	36	(6)
2009	FC Thun	13	(5)
2009	Shandong Luneng Taishan	15	(2)
2010	Changsha Ginde	28	(5)
- * Club domestic league appearances and goals as of 3 March 2010

Sandro Cardoso dos Santos (born March 22, 1980), simply known as Sandro is a Brazilian footballer who plays as a role of forward.

He was a member of U-19 Brazil national football team and a top scorer of 2001 season K-league.

He scored the decisive winning goal in the 2001 AFC Champions League Final against Jubilo Iwata.

He joined Shandong Luneng Taishan in July 2009 and scored his first goal for Shandong on August 26, 2009 against Changchun Yatai with 2-3 loss.

Sandro moved back to Changsha Ginde in February 2010.

== Playstyle ==
He used his physical strength and technical skills to move past through the defenders. During his career, he had a high rate of converting scoring opportunities into goals.

== Career ==
=== Portuguesa ===
Sandro started his career in Brazil in 1998, playing in Portuguesa. However, due to his young age, he could not play regularly and only played U-18 and reserve games.

=== Suwon Samsung Bluewings ===
In 2000, Sha Sha, who had been a limited foreign player, gave up a season and was out of the swamp. Suwon Samsung Bluewings decided to release both Sasha and Vitali and they wanted to reinforce foreign attacking resources. At the time, Suwon had big expectations for Rookie, and Sandro was an unexpected player. Sandro's $100,000 in rent and $600,000 in Rookies showed a remarkable difference. But when opened the lid, the result was the opposite. Rookie was sluggish for every game he played, scoring only one goal in five games, and Sandro showed four goals in eight games in regular league games. In the end, the rookie was forced to exit during the regular season and Sandro was a complete transfer, and in the 2000 Adidas Cup, he scored one goal in all three games, contributing to the team's victory.

Sandro, who had a chance in 2000, had a 2001 season under Kim Ho(Head Coach) full-fledged belief and made the 2001 season his year. Suwon won the Adidas Cup final in 2001, although Suwon did not win the regular league in Seongnam Ilhwa Chunma, but the Go-de-trio, which he created with Ko Jong-soo and Dennis, Of the world. Sandro was in the K-League, scoring 11 goals in 22 league games with 13 goals and three assists. And in the international arena, Sandro's victory was even more prominent. In the final of the 20th Asian Club Championship in 2001, Sandro scored the winning goal in the 14 minute with a fierce shot, It was also a great success in the Asian Super Cup, leading the team to the championship.

In 2002, Sandro's momentum did not stop. Although Allen and Mitro were expected to compete at the time, Sandro won the league with his ability. In the regular season of 2002, Sandro played 22 games with eight goals and seven assists, while Mitro had six scoreless and Allen was discharged without a match. Sandro's performance also continued in the FA Cup, and Suwon won the FA Cup for the first time. Sandro played a major role in the J-League, and Sandro moved to Jeff United Ichihara in 2003.

=== Jeff United Ichihara ===
Sandro did not stop in Japan. In 2003, he played with Choi Yong-soo and scored 8 goals in 23 games. In 2004, he played 22 games and 9 goals in the following year. However, in May 2003, he was sentenced to nine months in prison and three years in prison for allegedly drinking alcohol at his house and raping a woman. Sandro, who never wanted to live in Japan, He strongly hoped. So, Suwon brought Sandro instead of giving $150,000 plus Gavi, who had already been judged to be out of squad.

=== Return Suwon Samsung Bluewings ===
Returning to Suwon, Sandro was called Na-Dae-ro trio with Kim Dae-ui and Nadson, and they received the expectations of Suwon fans. However Cha Bum's football was not Kim Ho-soo's football, and Sandro, who had not been able to improve his qualification compared to 2001, fell into a slump with 22 goals and three goals. In the following year, 2006, Sandro played in 11 games and scored three goals. In the end, Suwon took on Olivera and Silva in the second half of the transfer market and transferred to Jeonnam Dragons.

=== Jeonnam Dragons ===
Sandro, who moved to Jeonnam Dragons in the latter half of 2006, was given the duty to fill the vacancy in Hiroshi, who returned to Brazil after suffering a cruciate ligament injury. Sandro scored three goals in 10 games in the second half of the year and Jeonnam, which was not bad for the result, completely transferred Sandro in 2007. However, in 2007, when Hiroshi was back in the game, Sandro began to struggle in the main competition against Hiroshi after a yearly slump. In the end, Sandro left the Korean stage with a shabby report card, one goal in four games.

=== Other teams ===
Sandro, who moved to the Chinese Super League, Changsha Zander in the second half of 2007, scored 36 goals in 36 seasons in two seasons, and also played in the 2009 Swiss league FC Thun in 2009 and scored five goals in 13 games. After returning to China's Shandong Luneng in 2009, Sandro moved back to Changsha Zander after scoring five goals in 28 games, and since then has scored three goals in four games and now retired.

== Club statistics ==
Club performance			League		Cup		League Cup		Total	
Season	Club	League	Apps	Goals	Apps	Goals	Apps	Goals	Apps	Goals
Japan			League		Emperor's Cup		J.League Cup		Total	
2003	JEF United Ichihara	J1 League	23	8	3	2	1	1	27	11
2004	JEF United Ichihara	J1 League	22	9	0	0	4	2	26	11
Total			45	17	3	2	5	3	53	22

== Honours ==
- K-League Top Scorer : 2001
- K-League Best XI : 2001
- Korean FA Cup : 2002
- Korean League Cup : 1999, 2000, 2001, 2005
- Korean Super Cup : 1999, 2000, 2005
- Asian Club Championship : 2001, 2002
- Asian Super Cup : 2001, 2002
