= Shin Young-rok =

South Korean footballer

Shin Young-Rok 신영록
Personal information
- Full name: Shin Young-Rok
- Date of birth: 27 March 1987 (age 39)
- Place of birth: Seoul, South Korea
- Height: 1.82 m (5 ft 11 1/2 in)
- Position: Forward

Senior career*
Years	Team	Apps	(Gls)
2003–2008	Suwon Bluewings	39	(10)
2009–2010	Bursaspor	24	(6)
2010	Suwon Bluewings	8	(3)
2011	Jeju United	8	(0)

International career^{‡}
2002–2003	South Korea U-17	6	(4)
2004–2007	South Korea U-20	41	(23)
2007–2008	South Korea U-23	9	(1)
2006–2009	South Korea	3	(0)
- * Club domestic league appearances and goals as of 21 May 2011 ‡ National team caps and goals as of 15 October 2008

- Shin Young-rok
- Hangul: 신영록
- Hanja: 辛泳錄
- RR: Sin Yeongrok
- MR: Sin Yŏngnok

Shin Young-Rok (born 27 March 1987 in Seoul) is a South Korean football forward who plays for Jeju United in the K-League. He usually plays as a centre forward or a striker. Shin is renowned for his strength in holding up the ball, excellent close control and dribbling skills, aerial ability, and power and accuracy of his shooting.

Cha Bum-Kun, the most prolific South Korea striker of all time, has praised his precision in penalty area which he claims is better than his during his days as a footballer.

He was the top scorer and MVP at the U-19 Qatar International Tournament, held in 2006.

He joined Bursaspor in January 2009.

While at Bursaspor Shin scored his first goal in only his second full match for the club against Gençlerbirliği on 8 February 2009. In spite of enjoying moderate success with Bursaspor, Shin's short career in Turkey came to an abrupt end when he walked out on his club due to contract violations (disputed between the player and club). Despite threats from Bursaspor, Shin returned clubless to South Korea and signed with FC Tom Tomsk at the end of December, 2009. However, the contract problem with his former club prevented him from joining or playing for Tom Tomsk.

On 28 January 2011 Shin completed a move to Jeju United for an undisclosed fee.

On 8 May 2011, Shin entered the game against Daegu at the 82nd minute. After chipping in a shot just before the end, he fell down on the pitch, suffering a heart attack. Medical staff immediately provided cardiopulmonary resuscitation on site. Once he started breathing again, he was quickly taken to a local hospital, where he remained uncouncious. After 50 days in coma he miraculously woke up and was transferred to a hospital in Seoul, where he is currently receiving further diagnosis and treatment.

== Honours ==
=== Individual ===
- U-19 Qatar International Tournament MVP & Top Scorer: 2006

=== Club ===
Suwon Bluewings

- K League Champions: 2004, 2008
- FA Cup Winners: 2010
- League Cup Winners: 2005, 2008
- Korean Super Cup Winners: 2005
- A3 Champions Cup Winners: 2005

== Career statistics ==
As of 8 May 2011

Club performance			League		Cup		League Cup		Continental		Total	
Season	Club	League	Apps	Goals	Apps	Goals	Apps	Goals	Apps	Goals	Apps	Goals
Korea Republic			League		FA Cup		K-League Cup		Asia		Total	
2003	Suwon Bluewings	K-League	3	0	0	0	-		-		3	0
2004	Suwon Bluewings	K-League	1	0	2	0	5	0	-		8	0
2005	Suwon Bluewings	K-League	6	1	0	0	1	0	1	0	8	1
2006	Suwon Bluewings	K-League	8	1	4	0	4	1	-		16	2
2007	Suwon Bluewings	K-League	3	2	1	0	0	0	-		4	2
2008	Suwon Bluewings	K-League	18	6	2	0	5	1	-		25	7
Turkey			League		Türkiye Kupası		League Cup		Europe		Total	
2008–09	Bursaspor	Süper Lig	17	4	1	0	-		-		18	4
2009–10	Bursaspor	Süper Lig	7	2	0	0	-		-		7	2
Korea Republic			League		FA Cup		K-League Cup		Asia		Total	
2010	Suwon Bluewings	K-League	8	3	3	0	1	0	2	0	14	3
2011	Jeju United	K-League	8	0	0	0	0	0	4	2	12	2
Country	Korea Republic		55	13	12	0	16	2	7	2	90	17
Country	Turkey		24	6	1	0	-		-		25	6
Total			79	19	13	0	16	2	7	2	115	23
