= Yoon Sung-hyo =

South Korean footballer and manager

Yoon Sung-Hyo 윤성효
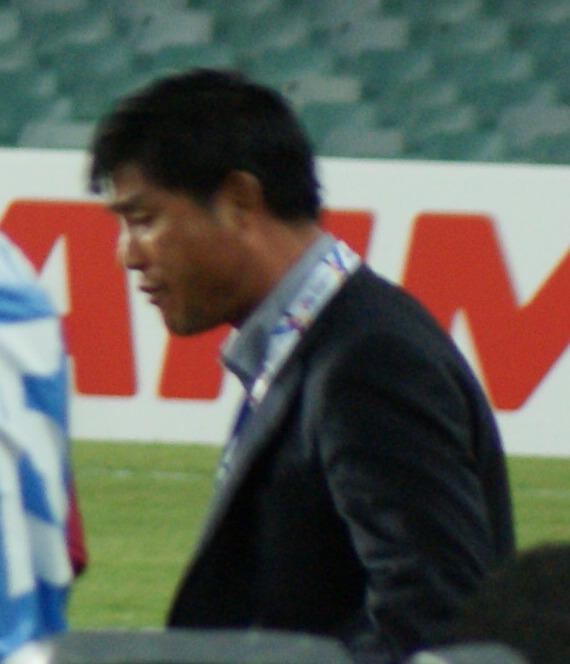

Personal information
- Full name: Yoon Sung-Hyo
- Date of birth: 18 May 1962 (age 64)
- Place of birth: Gimhae, Gyeongnam, South Korea
- Height: 1.73 m (5 ft 8 in)
- Position: Defender

Team information
- Current team: Gimhae FC (manager)

Youth career
- 1981–1984: Yonsei University

Senior career*
Years	Team	Apps	(Gls)
1985–1986	Hanil Bank	20	(5)
1987–1993	POSCO Atoms	162	(6)
1994–1995	Daewoo Royals	47	(2)
1996–1998	Suwon Samsung Bluewings	79	(10)
2000	Suwon Samsung Bluewings	3	(0)
Total		311	(23)

Managerial career
- 1999: Suwon Samsung Bluewings (youth)
- 2000–2003: Suwon Samsung Bluewings (assistant)
- 2004–2010: Soongsil University
- 2010–2012: Suwon Samsung Bluewings
- 2013–2015: Busan IPark
- 2017–: Gimhae FC
- * Club domestic league appearances and goals

Yoon Sung-Hyo (born 18 May 1962) is a South Korean football manager and former player. He is currently manager of Gimhae FC.
