= Lee Byung-keun =

South Korean footballer

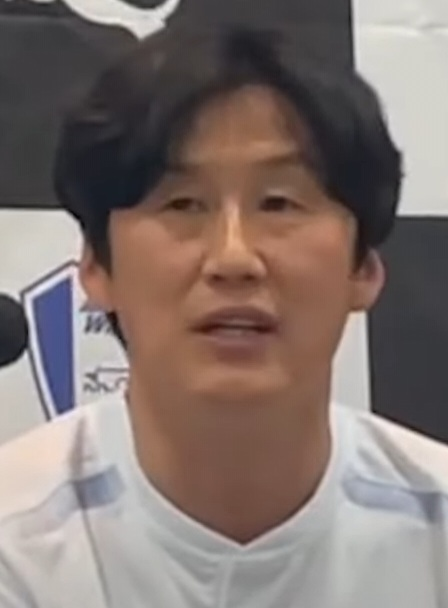

Personal information
- Date of birth: 28 April 1973 (age 53)
- Place of birth: Sancheong, Gyeongnam, South Korea
- Height: 1.75 m (5 ft 9 in)
- Position: Midfielder

Youth career
- 1992–1995: Hanyang University

Senior career*
Years	Team	Apps	(Gls)
1996–2006	Suwon Samsung Bluewings	226	(7)
2006–2007	Daegu FC	13	(3)
2007–2008	FC Oberneuland		
2008	Seoul United		

International career^{‡}
1995	South Korea U-23	2	(0)
1998–2000	South Korea	8	(0)

Managerial career
- 2012: Gyeongnam FC (Chief coach)
- 2013–2018: Suwon Samsung Bluewings (Assistant coach)
- 2018: Suwon Samsung Bluewings (Caretaker Manager)
- 2019: Daegu FC (Assistant coach)
- 2020: Daegu FC (Caretaker Manager)'
- 2022-2023: Suwon Samsung Bluewings (Manager)
- * Club domestic league appearances and goals as of 1 October 2022 ‡ National team caps and goals as of 10 June 2007

- Lee Byung-keun
- Hangul: 이병근
- Hanja: 李柄根
- RR: I Byeonggeun
- MR: I Pyŏnggŭn

Lee Byung-keun (born 28 April 1973) is a South Korean former footballer and current Manager.

Lee started his career as a professional footballer as a founding member of Suwon Samsung Bluewings in 1996. He played for Suwon Samsung Bluewings for ten years as one of the most steady players in the team.

He contract to Gyeongnam FC as a scouter in 2008. In 2012, he was named as chief assistant coach of the club.

In 2013, he moved to Suwon Samsung Bluewings as the chief assistant coach of the club. However, he was named caretaker manager of Suwon Samsung Bluewings September 2018. He left the club the following month.

At the beginning of 2019 Season, he joined Daegu FC as the chief assistant coach of the club. However, he was named caretaker manager of Daegu FC on February 5, 2020 to lead the club in the upcoming 2020 K League 1 season.

== Club career ==
- Suwon Samsung Bluewings 1996–2006
- Daegu FC 2006–2007
- FC Oberneuland 2007–2008
- Seoul United FC 2008

== Club career statistics ==
Club performance			League		Cup		League Cup		Continental		Total	
Season	Club	League	Apps	Goals	Apps	Goals	Apps	Goals	Apps	Goals	Apps	Goals
South Korea			League		KFA Cup		League Cup		Asia		Total	
1996	Suwon Samsung Bluewings	K-League	24	0	?	?	6	0	-			
1997	Suwon Samsung Bluewings	K-League	17	1	?	?	16	1	-			
1998	Suwon Samsung Bluewings	K-League	14	1	?	?	15	0	-			
1999	Suwon Samsung Bluewings	K-League	27	2	?	?	12	0	?	?		
2000	Suwon Samsung Bluewings	K-League	22	0	?	?	3	0	?	?		
2001	Suwon Samsung Bluewings	K-League	24	0	?	?	7	0	?	?		
2002	Suwon Samsung Bluewings	K-League	27	0	?	?	9	0	?	?		
2003	Suwon Samsung Bluewings	K-League	38	2	1	0	-		-		39	2
2004	Suwon Samsung Bluewings	K-League	8	0	0	0	8	0	-		16	0
2005	Suwon Samsung Bluewings	K-League	21	0	2	0	7	0	?	?		
2006	Suwon Samsung Bluewings	K-League	4	0	1	0	0	0	-		5	0
2006	Daegu FC	K-League	10	2	1	0	0	0	-		11	2
2007	Daegu FC	K-League	3	1	0	0	2	0	-		5	1
Total	South Korea		239	9			85	1				
Career total			239	9			85	1				

Sporting positions
Preceded by Kim Jin-woo	Suwon Samsung Bluewings captain 2004	Succeeded by Choi Sung-yong
