= Park Kun-ha =

South Korean footballer (born 1971)

Park Kun-ha 박건하
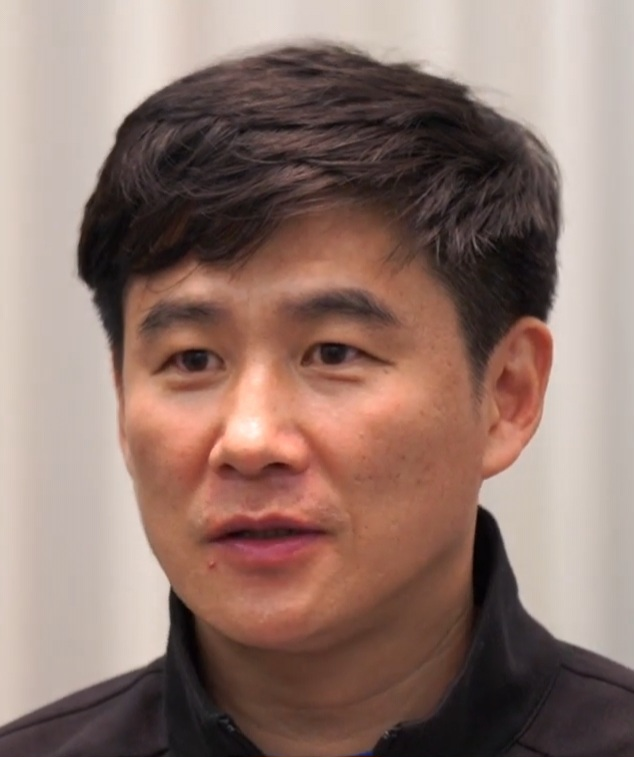

Personal information
- Date of birth: 25 July 1971 (age 55)
- Place of birth: Daejeon, South Korea
- Height: 1.82 m (6 ft 0 in)
- Position: Utility player

Team information
- Current team: Suwon FC (manager)

Youth career
- 1990–1993: Kyunghee University

Senior career*
| Years | Team | Apps | (Gls) |
| 1994–1995 | E-Land | | |
| 1996–2006 | Suwon Samsung Bluewings | 292 | (44) |
| 2000 | → Kashiwa Reysol (loan) | 5 | (1) |

International career
| 1996–1998 | South Korea | 20 | (5) |

Managerial career
- 2016: Seoul E-Land
- 2020–2022: Suwon Samsung Bluewings
- 2025–: Suwon FC
- * Club domestic league appearances and goals

- Park Kun-ha
- Hangul: 박건하
- Hanja: 朴建夏
- RR: Bak Geonha
- MR: Pak Kŏnha

Park Kun-ha (born 25 July 1971) is a South Korean football manager and former professional player, He currently manager of K League 2 club Suwon FC.

== Career ==
Park was born in Daejeon, South Korea. He started his professional career in 1996 as the founding member of Suwon Samsung Bluewings. At first, he played as a striker and scored many goals and help the Bluewings to win the championship in 1998 and 1999 and Asian Champions Cup and Asian Super Cup in 2001 and 2002, respectively. Later, he changed his position to defender and helped the Bluewings to win their third championship in the history.

He retired in 2006 and became an assistant coach of the first team at the Suwon Bluewings. In 2009, he became the manager of Suwon Bluewings U18 team (Maetan High School Football Club).

With Bluewings, he won three K-League championships and also won the Rookie of the Year award in the 1996 season.

== Career statistics ==
=== Club ===
Appearances and goals by club, season and competition
| Club | Season | League | | |
| Club | Season | Division | Apps | Goals |
|---|---|---|---|---|
| Suwon Samsung Bluewings | 1996 | K-League | 34 | 14 |
| Suwon Samsung Bluewings | 1997 | K-League | 19 | 2 |
| Suwon Samsung Bluewings | 1998 | K-League | 22 | 2 |
| Suwon Samsung Bluewings | 1999 | K-League | 39 | 12 |
| Suwon Samsung Bluewings | 2000 | K-League | 19 | 6 |
| Suwon Samsung Bluewings | 2001 | K-League | 30 | 4 |
| Suwon Samsung Bluewings | 2002 | K-League | 26 | 2 |
| Suwon Samsung Bluewings | 2003 | K-League | 31 | 0 |
| Suwon Samsung Bluewings | 2004 | K-League | 31 | 1 |
| Suwon Samsung Bluewings | 2005 | K-League | 26 | 1 |
| Suwon Samsung Bluewings | 2006 | K-League | 15 | 0 |
| Suwon Samsung Bluewings | Total | | 292 | 44 |
| Kashiwa Reysol (loan) | 2000 | J1 League | 5 | 1 |
| Career total | | | 297 | 45 |

=== International ===
Appearances and goals by national team and year
| National team | Year | Apps | Goals |
|---|---|---|---|
| Korea Republic | 1996 | 2 | 0 |
| Korea Republic | 1997 | 15 | 5 |
| Korea Republic | 1998 | 3 | 0 |
| Total | | 20 | 5 |

Results list South Korea's goal tally first.

| Date | Venue | Opponent | Scored | Result | Competition |
|---|---|---|---|---|---|
| 25 January 1997 | Sydney, Australia | New Zealand | 1 goal | 3–1 | 1997 Opus Tournament |
| 23 April 1997 | Beijing, China | China | 2 goals | 2–0 | Korea-China Annual Match |
| 28 May 1997 | Daejeon, South Korea | Hong Kong | 1 goal | 4–0 | 1998 FIFA World Cup qualification |
| 12 June 1997 | Seoul, South Korea | Egypt | 1 goal | 3–1 | 1997 Korea Cup |

Sporting positions
| Preceded by Shin Hong-gi | Suwon Samsung Bluewings captain 2001 | Succeeded by Seo Jung-won |
