= Kim Jin-woo (footballer) =

South Korean footballer (born 1975)

Kim Jin-woo 김진우
Personal information
- Full name: Kim Jin-woo
- Date of birth: October 9, 1975 (age 51)
- Place of birth: South Korea
- Height: 1.79 m (5 ft 10 1/2 in)
- Position: Midfielder

Team information
- Current team: Daejeon Citizen (coach)

Youth career
- 1994–1995: Daegu University

Senior career*
Years	Team	Apps	(Gls)
1996–2007	Suwon Samsung Bluewings	205	(0)
Total		205	(0)

International career
1993	South Korea U-20		
2000	South Korea	2	(0)

Managerial career
- 2008–2010: Suwon Samsung Bluewings (youth coach)
- 2010–2012: Suwon Samsung Bluewings (coach)
- 2013–2015: Gyeongnam FC (coach)
- 2016–2017: Busan Foreign University
- 2018–: Daejeon Citizen (assistant manager)
- * Club domestic league appearances and goals

- Kim Jin-woo
- Hangul: 김진우
- Hanja: 金珍友
- RR: Gim Jinu
- MR: Kim Chinu

Kim Jin-woo (born October 9, 1975) is a football player from South Korea who plays as a midfielder.

He represented South Korea at youth and senior levels. However, his contribution to the senior team was brief and consisted of only two matches against New Zealand in 2000.

Kim's entire professional career has been spent with Suwon Samsung Bluewings, one of the dominant forces in South Korean football. His debut came during the 1996 season, and by the end of 2005 he had played 279 times for the Suwon Bluewings franchise, scoring two goals and providing 17 assists. In that time he has also committed 727 fouls and has earned himself 77 yellow cards, but never a red one.

== Club career statistics ==
Club performance			League		Cup		League Cup		Continental		Total	
Season	Club	League	Apps	Goals	Apps	Goals	Apps	Goals	Apps	Goals	Apps	Goals
South Korea			League		KFA Cup		League Cup		Asia		Total	
1996	Suwon Samsung Bluewings	K-League	16	0	?	?	7	0	-			
1997	Suwon Samsung Bluewings	K-League	16	0	?	?	14	0	?	?		
1998	Suwon Samsung Bluewings	K-League	17	0	?	?	16	0	?	?		
1999	Suwon Samsung Bluewings	K-League	28	0	?	?	13	0	?	?		
2000	Suwon Samsung Bluewings	K-League	24	0	?	?	10	1	?	?		
2001	Suwon Samsung Bluewings	K-League	16	0	?	?	11	1	?	?		
2002	Suwon Samsung Bluewings	K-League	13	0	?	?	0	0	?	?		
2003	Suwon Samsung Bluewings	K-League	26	0	1	0	-		-		27	0
2004	Suwon Samsung Bluewings	K-League	24	0	0	0	11	0	-		35	0
2005	Suwon Samsung Bluewings	K-League	7	0	2	0	11	0	?	?		
2006	Suwon Samsung Bluewings	K-League	14	0	3	0	8	0	-		25	0
2007	Suwon Samsung Bluewings	K-League	4	0	0	0	4	0	-		8	0
Total	South Korea		205	0			105	2				
Career total			205	0			105	2				

Sporting positions
Preceded by Seo Jung-won	Suwon Samsung Bluewings captain 2003	Succeeded by Lee Byung-keun
