= 2017 Seongnam FC season =

Seongnam FC
2017 season
- Chairman: Lee Jae-myung (Mayor of Seongnam)
- Manager: Park Kyung-hoon
- Stadium: Tancheon Stadium
- K League Challenge: 10th
- FA Cup: Round 4
- Top goalscorer: League: – All: –
- Highest home attendance: –
- Lowest home attendance: –
- Average home league attendance: –
Home colours	Away colours

The 2017 Seongnam FC season was Seongnam FC's first edition in K League Challenge since its establishment in 1989 as Ilhwa Chunma Football Club and in its current name, Seongnam FC. The team contested the 2017 Korean FA Cup.

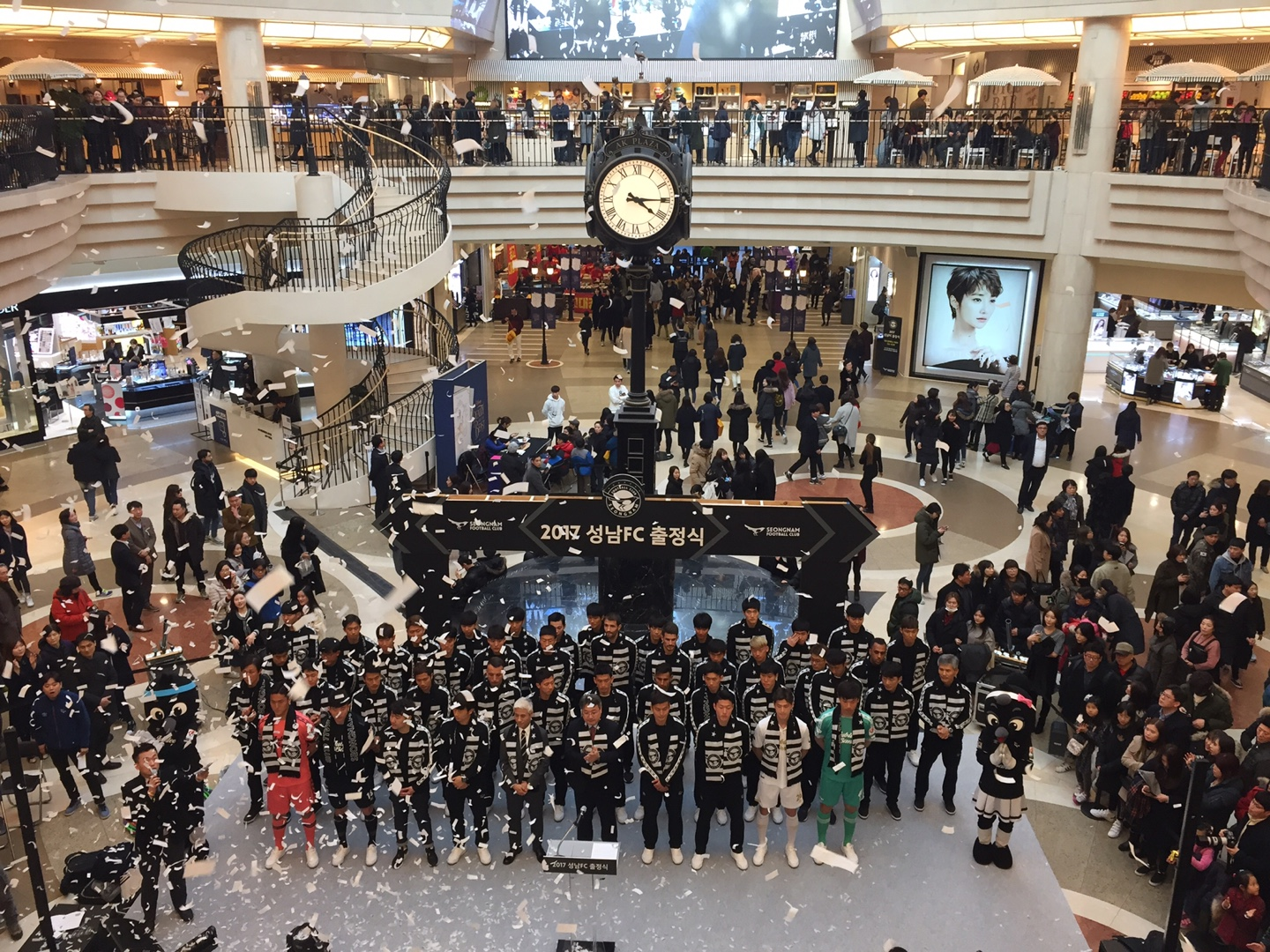
Seongnam FC 2017 Season Opening Ceremony. AK Plaza Bundang, Seohyeon Station. 25 February 2017

== Pre-season ==
As of 19 February 2017

Seongnam FC set up the pre-season plan to stay in Namhae, Mokpo and Murcia, Spain.

=== Namhae, 05-15 Jan 2017 ===
Seongnam FC focused on fitness training in Namhae.

=== Mokpo, 15-27 Jan 2017 ===
Seongnam FC had practice matches against University teams and a Korea National League side nearby.

Win Draw Loss Upcoming fixture

19 January 2017	Seongnam FC	2–1	Woosuk University	Mokpo
Unknown KST	Hwang Ui-jo; Lee Geon-yeop (pen.)	Report	Unknown	Stadium: Unknown; Attendance: N/A; Referee: Unknown

24 January 2017	Seongnam FC	3–1	Jeonju University	Mokpo
Unknown KST	Neco; Jo Jae-cheol; Lee Chang-hoon	Report	Unknown	Stadium: Unknown; Attendance: N/A; Referee: Unknown

26 January 2017	Seongnam FC	3–1	Mokpo City FC	Mokpo
Unknown KST	Neco; Hwang Ui-jo; Hwang Ui-jo	Report	Unknown	Stadium: Unknown; Attendance: N/A; Referee: Unknown

26 January 2017	Seongnam FC	3–0	Sun Moon University	Mokpo
Unknown KST	Lee Chang-hoon; Hwang Won; Hwang Won	Report	Unknown	Stadium: Unknown; Attendance: N/A; Referee: Unknown

=== Murcia, Spain, 1-23 Feb 2017 ===
Seongnam FC stayed in Murcia and had practice matches in Pinatar Arena Football Center. All the schedule were coordinated by an agent, HMSports.

4 February 2017	AC Horsens	2–1	Seongnam FC	Murcia
15:30 CET	Kim Aabech 10'; Hallur Hansson 20'	Report	Hwang Ui-jo 49'	Stadium: Pinatar Arena Football Center; Attendance: N/A; Referee: Unknown

7 February 2017	FC Zenit Saint Petersburg	2–1	Seongnam FC	Murcia
10:30 CET	Aleksandr Kokorin 39'; Luka Đorđević 80'	Report	Paulo 51'	Stadium: La Finca; Attendance: N/A; Referee: Unknown

8 February 2017	Seongnam FC	1–0	Lorca FC	Murcia
11:30 CET	Lee Hyun-il 12'	Report		Stadium: Pinatar Arena Football Center; Attendance: N/A; Referee: Unknown

11 February 2017	LASK Linz	1–1	Seongnam FC	Murcia
15:30 CET	Descanso 45+2'	Report	Lee Chang-hoon 71'	Stadium: Pinatar Arena Football Center; Attendance: N/A; Referee: Unknown

13 February 2017	Calcio Leinfelden	0–2	Seongnam FC	Murcia
12:00 CET		Report	Shim Je-hyeok 68', 83'	Stadium: Pinatar Arena Football Center; Attendance: N/A; Referee: Unknown

13 February 2017	FC Dacia Chișinău	0–3	Seongnam FC	Murcia
15:00 CET		Report	Paulo 40' (pen.); Neco 78'; Hwang Ui-jo 83'	Stadium: Pinatar Arena Football Center; Attendance: N/A; Referee: Unknown

16 February 2017	Real Murcia Imperial	0–1	Seongnam FC	Murcia
11:00 CET		Report	Moon Ji-hwan 67'	Stadium: Pinatar Arena Football Center; Attendance: N/A; Referee: Unknown

16 February 2017	Mar Menor CF	1–1	Seongnam FC	Murcia
16:15 CET	Jose Isidoro; Paco Pepe (o.g.)	Report		Stadium: Pinatar Arena Football Center; Attendance: N/A; Referee: Unknown

20 February 2017	FC Rubin Kazan	2-0	Seongnam FC	Murcia
11:00 CET	Maksim Kanunnikov 55'; Denis Tkachuk 89'	Report		Stadium: La Finca; Attendance: N/A; Referee: Unknown

21 February 2017	Seongnam FC	2-1	Kongsvinger IL Toppfotball	Murcia
12:00 CET	Paulo 23'; Bae Seung-jin 40'	Report	Adem Güven 9'	Stadium: La Manga; Attendance: N/A; Referee: Unknown

21 February 2017	Seongnam FC	2-0	FC Cartagena	Murcia
16:30 CET	Lee Geon-yeop 69' 81'	Report		Stadium: Pinatar Arena Football Center; Attendance: N/A; Referee: Unknown

After the match against FC Cartagena, Seongnam FC squad return to South Korea, arriving on 23rd Feb 2017.

== Club Announcements ==
- 31 Mar 2017: The club announced that the sales figure of 2017 season ticket by far reached to 7,035. This is the best season ticket sales record in the club history.
- 3 Mar 2017: The club announced that the new signing from U-18 team(Poongsang High) - Lee Shi-hwan.
- 27 Feb 2017: The club announced that the sales figure of 2017 season ticket reached to 6,034 by then. It is similar to the last season.
- 25 Feb 2017: Seongnam FC held the opening ceremony of 2017 season at AK Plaza Bundang, Seohyeon Station. Bae Seung-jin is announced as the captain for the season.
- 20 Feb 2017: The club announced the number of season ticket sales reached to 5,048. The season ticket postings are started on the day. Also launched a collaborated merchandise with Oxford.
- 18 Feb 2017: The last recruit before 2017 Season, Dario Vidosic is announced.
- 17 Feb 2017: Home & Away Kit by Umbro is revealed.
- 13 Feb 2017: Seongnam FC renewed the contract with Kim Jung-min, FIFA Online pro-gamer.
- 12 Feb 2017: New signing Park Sung-ho joined the squad.
- 9 Feb 2017: The fixture of 2017 1st Half Open Youth Test of Seongnam FC is announced.
- 7 Feb 2017: Back numbers for 2017 K League Challenge is revealed.
- 3 Feb 2017: Marin Oršulić officially joined Seongnam.
- 19 Jan 2017: Seongnam FC unveiled the signing from Gwangju FC, Oh Do-hyun.
- 10 Jan 2017: Sponsorship agreement between the club and NHN Entertainment is on the news.
- 9 Jan 2017: Seongnam FC announced their sponsorship to Coexistence of Animal Rights on Earth and to 'Biscuit' an abandoned dog in CARE Abandoned Dog Shelter.
- 7 Jan 2017: Jeon Sang-wook (footballer) rejoined Seongnam FC as U-10 team coach, after his recovery from Nasopharynx cancer.
- 6 Jan 2017: Shim Je-hyeok joined the team from FC Seoul as a loan player.
- 5 Jan 2017: The club announced Neco joined the team.
- 4 Jan 2017: Yang Dong-won moved from Gangwon FC to Seongnam FC.
- 3 Jan 2017: An Jae-jun joined Seongnam FC from Incheon United as a free agent.
- 2 Jan 2017: Seongnam FC announced An Sang-hyun puts pen to paper to renew his contract with the club.
- 1 Jan 2017:Oh Jang-eun joined Seongnam FC from the archrival Suwon Samsung Bluewings.

== Squad ==
As of 21 February 2017

Note: Flags indicate national team as defined under FIFA eligibility rules; some limited exceptions apply. Players may hold more than one non-FIFA nationality.

No.	Pos.	Nation	Player
1	GK	KOR	Kim Dong-jun
2	DF	KOR	Kwak Hae-sung
3	MF	KOR	Yeon Je-woon
4	DF	KOR	Kim Tae-yoon
5	DF	CRO	Marin Oršulić
6	MF	KOR	Lee Tae-hee
7	MF	KOR	Kim Young-sin
8	MF	KOR	Kim Do-heon (Captain)
9	FW	BRA	Paulo Sérgio
10	MF	AUS	Dario Vidošić
11	FW	BRA	Danilo Neco
13	MF	KOR	Kim Dong-hee
14	DF	KOR	Bae Seung-jin
15	DF	KOR	Lee Ji-min
16	FW	KOR	Hwang Ui-jo
17	MF	KOR	Jo Jae-cheol
18	FW	KOR	Lee Hyun-il
19	MF	KOR	Lee Chang-hoon
20	MF	KOR	An Sang-hyun

No.	Pos.	Nation	Player
21	GK	KOR	Kim Keun-bae
22	DF	KOR	An Jae-jun
23	DF	KOR	Lee Hoo-kwon
24	DF	KOR	Lee Seung-hyeon
25	GK	KOR	Yang Dong-won
26	DF	KOR	Moon Ji-hwan
27	MF	KOR	Kim Yun-soo
28	MF	KOR	Ko Byung-il
30	MF	KOR	Lee Geon-yeop
32	FW	KOR	Hwang Won
33	DF	KOR	Jang Hak-young
34	MF	KOR	Lee Seong-jae
35	FW	KOR	Kim Min-kyoo
37	MF	KOR	Jang Eun-kyu (on loan from Jeju)
39	FW	KOR	Park Sung-ho
40	FW	KOR	Shim Je-hyeok (on loan from Seoul)
41	GK	KOR	Lee Shi-hwan
44	DF	KOR	Oh Do-hyun
49	MF	KOR	Oh Jang-eun

=== Out on loan ===
Note: Flags indicate national team as defined under FIFA eligibility rules; some limited exceptions apply. Players may hold more than one non-FIFA nationality.

No.	Pos.	Nation	Player
—	DF	KOR	Park Tae-min (to Gimpo Citizen)
—	DF	KOR	Yun Young-sun (to Sangju Sangmu for military duty)
—	MF	KOR	Kim Seong-jun (to Sangju Sangmu for military duty)
—	FW	KOR	Nam Joon-jae (to Ansan Police for military duty)
—	MF	KOR	Jung Seon-ho (to Sangju Sangmu for military duty)

No.	Pos.	Nation	Player
—	DF	KOR	Lim Chae-min (to Sangju Sangmu for military duty)
—	FW	KOR	Sung Bong-jae (to Gyeongnam FC)
—	MF	KOR	Lee Jong-won (to Sangju Sangmu for military duty)
—	GK	KOR	Park Jun-hyuk (to FC Pocheon for military duty)

== Competitions ==
=== Overview ===
Competition	Record							
Competition	G	W	D	L	GF	GA	GD	Win %
K League Challenge	0	0	0	0	0	0	+0	—
FA Cup	0	0	0	0	0	0	+0	—
Total	0	0	0	0	0	0	+0	—

Updated to match played 19 Feb 2017
Source: Competitions

=== K League Challenge ===
Pos	Team	Pld	W	D	L	GF	GA	GD	Pts	Qualification
3	Asan Mugunghwa	36	15	9	12	44	37	+7	54	Qualification for the promotion playoffs first round
4	Seongnam FC	36	13	14	9	38	30	+8	53	Qualification for the promotion playoffs first round
5	Bucheon FC 1995	36	15	7	14	50	46	+4	52	

Source: K League
Rules for classification: 1) Points; 2) Goals scored; 3) Goal difference; 4) Wins; 5) Head-to-head points.

Win Draw Loss Upcoming fixture

4 March 2017 1	Seongnam FC	0–1	Busan IPark	Seongnam
15:00 KST	An Jae-jun (yellow card) 23' Lee Chang-hoon (yellow card) 49'; Bae Seung-jin (yellow card) 65' Oh Jang-eun (yellow card) 87'	Report	Lee Jung-hyup 9' Kim Yun-ho (yellow card) 20'; Danny Morais (yellow card) 59' Heo Beom-san (yellow card) 89'	Stadium: Tancheon Stadium; Attendance: 6700; Referee: Jeong Dong-sik; Man of the Match: Lee Jung-hyup(Busan)

12 March 2017 2	Daejeon Citizen	1-1	Seongnam FC	Daejeon
15:00 KST	Lee Ho-seok 36' Shin Hak-young (yellow card) 61' Cristian Dănălache (yellow card) 90'	Report	AnJae-jun 2'; Bae Seung-jin (yellow card) 42'	Stadium: Daejeon World Cup Stadium; Attendance: 5,136; Referee: Kim Young-soo; Man of the Match: Cristian Dănălache(Daejeon)

18 March 2017 3	Seongnam FC	0–1	Suwon FC	Seongnam
17:00 KST	Marin Oršulić (yellow card) 45'; Bae Seung-jin (yellow card) 60'	Report	Seo Sang-min 1' Jung Chul-ho (yellow card) 53'; Bruce Djite (yellow card) 67' Park Chung-hyo (yellow card) 92'	Stadium: Tancheon Stadium; Attendance: 4,583; Referee: Park Byung-jin; Man of the Match: Vladan Adžić(Suwon)

25 March 2017 4	FC Anyang	2–0	Seongnam FC	Anyang
15:00 KST	Yong Jae-hyun (yellow card) 45' Cho Seok-jae 66'; Cho Seok-jae 76'; Aubin Kouakou (yellow card) 89' Bang Dae-jong (yellow card) 92'	Report		Stadium: Anyang Sports Complex; Attendance: 1,533; Referee: Chae Sang-hyup; Man of the Match: Cho Seok-jae(Anyang)

1 April 2017 5	Seoul E-Land FC	0–0	Seongnam FC	Seoul
15:00 KST	Joo Han-seong (yellow card) 8'; Kim Bong-rae (yellow card) 51'	Report	Shim Je-hyeok (yellow card) 53'	Stadium: Seoul Olympic Stadium; Attendance: 3,068; Referee: Choi Gwang-ho; Man of the Match: Kim Joon-tae(Seoul)

8 April 2017 6	Seongnam FC	1–2	Bucheon FC 1995	Seongnam
15:00 KST	Shim Je-hyeok (yellow card) 49' Hwang Ui-jo 53'; Lee Ji-min (yellow card) 85' Danilo Neco (yellow card) 87'	Report	Kim Yeong-nam 43'; Jin Chang-soo 93'	Stadium: Tancheon Stadium; Attendance: 3,099; Referee: Seong Deok-hyo; Man of the Match: Jin Chang-soo(Bucehon)

16 April 2017 7	Seongnam FC	1–2	Gyeongnam FC	Seongnam
15:00 KST	An Jae-jun (yellow card) 53' Lee Bum-soo 60' (o.g.) Jang Hak-young (yellow card) 78'	Report	Woo Joo-sung (yellow card) 1' Jung Won-jin 24'; Jeong Hyeon-cheol (yellow card) 45' Jeong Hyeon-cheol 48'	Stadium: Tancheon Stadium; Attendance: 3,021; Referee: Kim Dong-in; Man of the Match: Jung Won-jin(Gyeongnam)

22 April 2017 8	Asan Mugunghwa FC	1-1	Seongnam FC	Asan
15:00 KST	Kim Jae-woong (yellow card) 18'; Lee Chang-yong (yellow card) 40'; Choi Bo-kyung (yellow card) 45+2'; Jung Da-hwon 71'	Report	Lee Hyun-il (yellow card) 11' (yellow-red card); Hwang Ui-jo 55' (pen.)	Stadium: Yi Sun-sin Stadium; Attendance: 1,057; Referee: (South Korea) Ji-Im Jo

29 April 2017 9	Ansan Greeners FC	0-1	Seongnam FC	Ansan
15:00 KST	Lee Geon (yellow card) 17'; Lee In-jae (yellow card) 34'; Park Jun-hui (yellow card) 73'; Park Han-soo (yellow card) 90+1'	Report	Hwang Ui-jo 7'; Oh Do-hyun (yellow card) 45+1'; Kim Dong-hee (yellow card) 80'	Stadium: Ansan Wa~ Stadium; Attendance: 2,062; Referee: (South Korea) Kim Young-Su

3 May 2017 10	Seongnam FC	0-2	Seoul E-Land FC	Seongnam
15:00 KST		Report	Choi Ho-jung (yellow card) 27'; Kim Min-kyu (yellow card) 45'; Kim Jae-hyun 84'; Shim Young-sung 89'	Stadium: Tancheon Stadium; Attendance: 3,682; Referee: (South Korea) Chae Sang-Hyeop

7 May 2017 11	Suwon FC	0-1	Seongnam FC	Suwon
15:00 KST	Adžić (yellow card) 53'	Report	Park Sung-ho 69'; Kim Dong-jun (yellow card) 89'	Stadium: Suwon Sports Complex; Attendance: 2,012; Referee: (South Korea) Choi Gyu-Hyun

13 May 2017 12	Seongnam FC	0-0	FC Anyang	Seongnam
15:00 KST	Lee Seong-jae (yellow card) 7'; Lee Ji-min (yellow card) 18'	Report		Stadium: Tancheon Stadium; Attendance: 3,433; Referee: (South Korea) Park Jin-Ho

21 May 2017 13	Seongnam FC	1-0	Daejeon Citizen	Seongnam
19:00 KST	An Sang-hyun (yellow card) 8'; Oršulić (yellow card) 14'; Park Sung-ho 54'	Report	Kim Tae-bong (yellow card) 50'	Stadium: Tancheon Stadium; Attendance: 2,997; Referee: (South Korea) Park Byung-Jin

29 May 2017 14	Bucheon FC 1995	0-2	Seongnam FC	Bucheon
19:30 KST	Kim Han-bin (yellow card) 81'; Nilson (yellow card) 90'	Report	Oršulić (yellow card) 24'; Lee Ji-min 45+2'; Lee Hoo-kwon (yellow card) 50'; Kim Do-heon 71'; Park Sung-ho (yellow card) 90+2'	Stadium: Bucheon Stadium; Attendance: 1,136; Referee: (South Korea) Kim Young-Su

3 June 2017 15	Seongnam FC	0-0	Ansan Greeners FC	Seongnam
19:00 KST	Lee Seong-jae (yellow card) 19'; Paulo Sérgio (yellow card) 88'	Report	Tarragona (yellow card) 27'; Lee Geon (yellow card) 56'; Park Han-soo (yellow card) 82'; Jung Kyung-ho (yellow card) 83'	Stadium: Tancheon Stadium; Attendance: 2,901; Referee: (South Korea) Dong-Jun Lee

12 June 2017 16	Seongnam FC	1-0	Asan Mugunghwa FC	Seongnam
20:00 KST	Park Sung-ho 10'; Hwang Eui-Jo (yellow card) 87'	Report	Jung Da-hwon (yellow card) 13' (yellow-red card); Gong Min-hyun (yellow card) 53'; Han Ji-ho (yellow card) 64'; Kim Eun-sun (yellow card) 83'	Stadium: Tancheon Stadium; Attendance: 2,845; Referee: (South Korea) Kim Sung-Ho

19 June 2017 17	Busan IPark	1-2	Seongnam FC	Busan
19:00 KST	Yoo Ji-hoon (yellow card) 13'; Choi Seung-in 18'; Kwon Jin-young (yellow card) 36'	Report	Lee Hoo-kwon 11'; Hwang Eui-Jo 48' (pen.); Oršulić (yellow card) 76' (yellow-red card)	Stadium: Busan Asiad Main Stadium; Attendance: 2,025; Referee: (South Korea) Park Jin-Ho

24 June 2017 18	Gyeongnam FC	1-1	Seongnam FC	Changwon
19:00 KST	Jeong Hyeon-cheol (yellow card) 51'; Marcão (yellow card) 69'; Choi Jae-soo (yellow card) 73'; Song Je-heon 90+4'	Report	Hwang Eui-Jo 15'; Kim Do-heon (yellow card) 71'; Lee Ji-min (yellow card) 79'	Stadium: Changwon Football Center; Attendance: 5,012; Referee: (South Korea) Choi Kwang-Ho

2 July 2017 19	Seongnam FC	1-1	Bucheon FC 1995	Seongnam
19:00 KST	An Sang-hyun 52' (yellow card) 61'; Lee Tae-hee (yellow card) 87'; Yeon Je-woon (yellow card) 90+3'	Report	Lim Dong-hyuk 46'; Waguininho (yellow card) 76'	Stadium: Tancheon Stadium; Attendance: 2,450; Referee: (South Korea) Kim Woo-Sung

8 July 2017 20	Asan Mugunghwa FC	0-2	Seongnam FC	Asan
19:00 KST	Jo Sung-jin (yellow card) 24'; Lee Hyun-seung (yellow card) 79'; Kim Eun-sun (yellow card) 81'; Choi Bo-kyung (yellow card) 90+2'	Report	Jo Jae-cheol (yellow card) 40'; Park Sung-ho 45'; Lee Chang-hoon (yellow card) 47' (goal) 56'; Lee Tae-hee (yellow card) 70'; Yeon Je-woon (yellow card) 89'; Kim Dong-jun (yellow card) 90+4'	Stadium: Yi Sun-sin Stadium; Attendance: 1,326; Referee: (South Korea) Mae Ho-Young

16 July 2017 21	Ansan Greeners FC	1-1	Seongnam FC	Ansan
19:00 KST	Song Joo-ho (yellow card) 13'; Tarragona 15'; Lee Geon (yellow card) 42'; Park Jun-hui (yellow card) 42' (yellow-red card)	Report	An Sang-hyun (yellow card) 45'; Kim Dong-chan 82' (pen.); Oršulić (yellow card) 90'	Stadium: Ansan Wa~ Stadium; Attendance: 3,543; Referee: (South Korea) Jung Dong-Sik

23 July 2017 22	Seongnam FC	3-0	Suwon FC	Seongnam
19:00 KST	Kim Dong-chan 10' 45' 47'; Lee Seong-jae (yellow card) 23'	Report	Lee Kwang-jin (yellow card) 12'; Lee Seung-hyun (yellow card) 17'; Bae Ji-hoon (yellow card) 21'; Baek Sung-dong (yellow card) 23'	Stadium: Tancheon Stadium; Attendance: 2,420; Referee: (South Korea) Seo Dong-Jin

6 August 2017 23	Seoul E-Land FC	1-1	Seongnam FC	Seoul
19:00 KST	Alex 12' (pen.); Choi Ho-jung (yellow card) 30'; Choi Oh-baek (yellow card) 52'	Report	An Sang-hyun (yellow card) 19'; Park Sung-ho 32' (pen.); Oršulić (yellow card) 52'; Lee Tae-hee (yellow card) 73'	Stadium: Seoul Olympic Stadium; Attendance: 1,287; Referee: (South Korea) Lim Jung-Soo

14 August 2017 24	Seongnam FC	1-3	Gyeongnam FC	Seongnam
20:00 KST	Kim Dong Chan 26'; Jo Jae-cheol (yellow card) 64'; Lee Hoo-kwon (yellow card) 90'	Report	Jung Won-jin 19' 59'; Marcão (yellow card) 40'; Gwon yong-hyun (yellow card) 45'; Jeong Hyeon-cheol (yellow card) 65'; Park Ji-soo (yellow card) 68'; Bae Ki-jong 85'	Stadium: Tancheon Stadium; Referee: (South Korea) Ko Hyung-Jin

19 August 2017 25	FC Anyang	1-3	Seongnam FC	Anyang
19:00 KST	Cho Seok-jae 86'	Report	Kim Dong-Chan 23'; Jo Jae-cheol (yellow card) 31'; Lee Hyun-il 36'; Kwon Tae-an 39' (o.g.); Lee Seong-jae (yellow card) 54'; Jang Hak-young (yellow card) 84'; An Sang-hyun (yellow card) 90+1'	Stadium: Anyang Sports Complex; Attendance: 2,219; Referee: (South Korea) Park Byung-Jin

23 August 2017 26	Seongnam FC	1-1	Busan IPark	Seongnam
20:00 KST	Yeon Je-woon (yellow card) 28'; Kim Do-heon 90+1'	Report	Lee Jae-kwon 86' (yellow card) 90'	Stadium: Tancheon Stadium; Attendance: 2,023; Referee: (South Korea) Kim Jong-Hyeok

27 August 2017 27	Daejeon Citizen	1-4	Seongnam FC	Daejeon
19:00 KST	Bruno Cantanhede (yellow card) 45'; Jang Won-seok (yellow card) 58'; Jung Min-woo 82'; Lee Ho-seok (yellow card) 83'; Kim Gi-yong (yellow card) 90+3'	Report	Jo Jae-cheol 33' (yellow card) 67'; Hlohovský 41'; Lee Hyun-il 76'; Kim Do-heon 90+4' (pen.)	Stadium: Daejeon World Cup Stadium; Attendance: 1,819; Referee: (South Korea) Choi Gyu-Hyun

2 September 2017 28	Seongnam FC	1-0	Ansan Greeners FC	Seongnam
19:00 KST	Park Sung-ho 88' (pen.)	Report	Ahn Young-kyu (yellow card) 64'; Ha In-ho (yellow card) 78'; Choi Jin-soo (yellow card) 90+4'	Stadium: Tancheon Stadium; Attendance: 1,803; Referee: (South Korea) Jung Dong-Sik

10 September 2017 29	Bucheon FC 1995	3-2	Seongnam FC	Bucheon
18:00 KST	Jo Soo-chul 29'; Rodrigo Paraná 47'; Moon Ki-han 64'; Kim Shin (yellow card) 90+4'	Report	An Sang-hyun (yellow card) 5'; An Jae-jun (yellow card) 44'; Hlohovský 49' 53'	Stadium: Bucheon Stadium; Attendance: 2,012; Referee: (South Korea) Park Byung-Jin

16 September 2017 30	Seongnam FC	–	Seoul E-Land FC	Seongnam
19:00 KST		Report		Stadium: Tancheon Stadium

==== Results summary ====
Overall								Home						Away					
Pld	W	D	L	GF	GA	GD	Pts	W	D	L	GF	GA	GD	W	D	L	GF	GA	GD
36	13	14	9	38	30	+8	53	6	6	6	16	16	0	7	8	3	22	14	+8

Last updated: 15 November 2017.
Source: K League Homepage

=== Korean FA Cup ===
Seongnam FC participates in 2017 Korean FA Cup from Round 3 as K League Challenge team.

On 7 March 2017, in 2017 Korean FA Cup 3, 4 Rounds Draw, Seongnam FC were drawn against Suwon FC. The original draw was Suwon FC's home, but it is decided as Seongnam FC's home due to Suwon's absence at the draw. Win Draw Loss Upcoming fixture

29 March 2017 2017 Korean FA Cup Round 3	Seongnam FC	0 – 0 (a.e.t.) (5–4 p)	Suwon FC	Seongnam
Unknown KST	Lee Hoo-kwon (yellow card) 7'; Dario Vidošić (yellow card) 20'	Report	Bae Ji-hoon (yellow card) 17' Bae Shin-young (yellow card) 38' Lim Ha-ram (yellow card) 97'	Stadium: Tancheon Stadium; Attendance: 1,506
	Penalties
	Dario Vidošić (penalty scored) Lee Tae-hee (penalty scored); Shim Je-hyeok (penalty missed); Yeon Je-woon (penalty scored); Kim Young-sin (penalty scored); Bae Seung-jin (penalty missed) Jang Hak-young (penalty scored)		(penalty missed) Bruce Djite (penalty scored) Lee Kwang-jin; (penalty scored) Vladan Adžić; (penalty scored) Song Soo-young; (penalty scored) Bae Shin-young; (penalty missed) Yoon Tae-su (penalty missed) Jung Hoon

19 April 2017 2017 Korean FA Cup Last 32	Seongnam FC	3 - 1	Cheongju City	Seongnam
19:00 KST		Report		Stadium: Tancheon Stadium

17 May 2017 2017 Korean FA Cup Last 16	Gangwon FC	0 - 1	Seongnam FC	Pyeongchang County
19:00 KST	Oh Beom-seok (yellow card) 90'	Report	An Sang-hyun (yellow card) 34'; Oršulić 67'	Stadium: Alpensia Ski Jumping Stadium; Referee: (South Korea) Choi Dae-Woo

9 August 2017 2017 Korean FA Cup Quarter Final	Seongnam FC	0 - 3	Mokpo City	Seongnam
20:00 KST	Lee Chang-hoon (yellow card) 45' (yellow-red card)	Report	Jung Sung-Gyo 2' (pen.); Lee In-Kyu 24'; Cheon Je-Hun (yellow card) 32'; Kim Young-Wook 42'; Son Kyung-Hwan (yellow card) 90'; Kang Yun-Koo (yellow card) 90'	Stadium: Tancheon Stadium; Referee: (South Korea) Choi Dae-Woo

== Tickets ==
=== Season Ticket ===
On 13 December 2016, the club started the sales of 2017 Seongnam FC season ticket. The first purchase was made by the chairman, Lee Jae-myung and he triggered a 'Pass-Pass Relay' campaign. The campaign is a season ticket holder to nominated participants to purchase Seongnam FC season ticket.

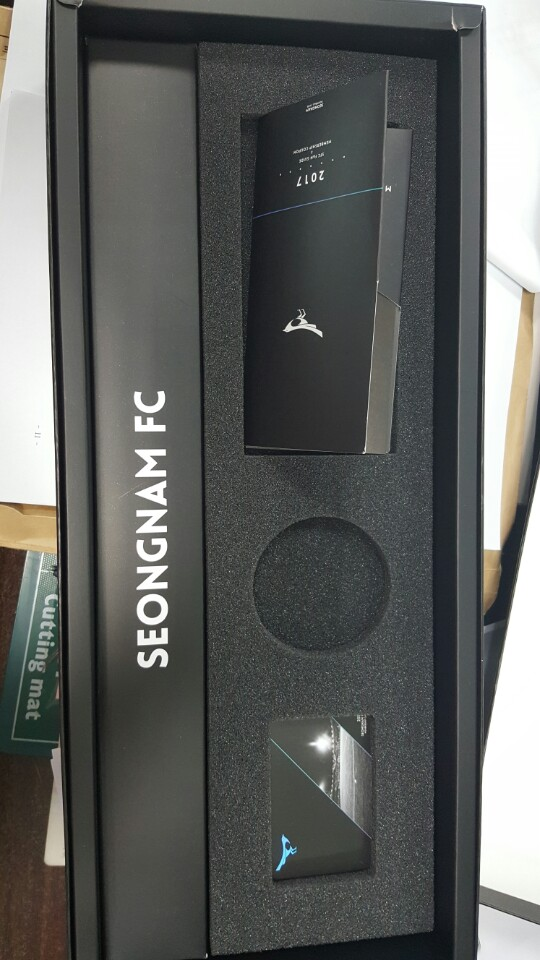
2017 Seongnam FC Season Ticket Package

==== Sales Period ====
- Early Bird Sales: 21 December 2016 10:00(KST) - 20 January 2017
- General Sales: 21 January - 28 April 2017
- Sold at Tancheon Sports Complex on Seongnam FC home games, or via Interpark website.

==== Prices ====
2017 Seongnam FC Season Ticket Prices
KRW	Category	VIP	W Stand	E Stand	Black Zone
General	Adult	300,000	120,000	100,000	90,000
General	Youth	300,000	70,000	60,000	50,000
General	Child	300,000	40,000	40,000	N/A
General	Family 1(A1&C1)	N/A	128,000	112,000	72,000
General	Family 2(A1&C2+)	N/A	160,000	144,000	72,000
General	Family 3(A2&C1)	N/A	224,000	192,000	144,000
General	Family 4(A2&C2)	N/A	256,000	224,000	144,000
General	Family 5(A2&C3+)	N/A	288,000	256,000	144,000
Corporate*	Premium Black (50 Sets)	300,000	10 Million	N/A	N/A
Corporate*	Royal Black (20 Sets)	300,000	6 Million	N/A	N/A
Corporate*	Real Black (10 Sets)	300,000	2.5 Million	N/A	N/A

* Currency is South Korean won.

* Corporate Season Ticket Set is consist of a Ticket book, SFC Umbrella and SFC Calendar.
