= 2016 Seongnam FC season =

Seongnam FC
2016 season
- Chairman: Lee Jae-myung
- Manager: Kim Hak-bum
- Stadium: Tancheon Stadium
- K League Classic: 11th - Relegated
- FA Cup: Quarter Finals
- Top goalscorer: League: Tiago; All: Tiago
- Average home league attendance: 7,144
Home colours	Away colours

The 2016 Seongnam FC season is the club's twenty-eighth consecutive season in K League Classic since its establishment in 1989 as Ilhwa Chunma Football Club and the third season in its current name, Seongnam FC. The team will also competing in the 2016 Korean FA Cup.

== Squad ==
As of 16 April 2016

Note: Flags indicate national team as defined under FIFA eligibility rules; some limited exceptions apply. Players may hold more than one non-FIFA nationality.

No.	Pos.	Nation	Player
1	GK	KOR	Jeon Sang-wook
2	DF	KOR	Kwak Hae-sung
4	DF	KOR	Kim Tae-yoon
5	DF	KOR	Lim Chae-min
6	MF	KOR	Lee Tae-hee
7	MF	KOR	Hwang Jin-sung
8	MF	KOR	Kim Do-heon (Captain)
10	FW	KOR	Hwang Ui-jo
11	FW	BRA	Tiago
13	MF	KOR	Kim Dong-hee
14	MF	KOR	Jung Seon-ho
15	DF	KOR	Choi Ho-jung (on loan from Daegu)
16	MF	KOR	An Sang-hyun
17	DF	KOR	Park Tae-min
19	FW	KOR	Park Yong-ji
20	DF	KOR	Yun Young-sun
21	GK	KOR	Kim Keun-bae
22	MF	KOR	Lee Jong-won

No.	Pos.	Nation	Player
23	FW	KOR	Yoo Chang-hyun
24	DF	KOR	Jang Suk-won
25	DF	KOR	Yeom Yoo-shin
26	MF	ARG	Pitu Garcia
27	FW	KOR	Sung Bong-jae
28	DF	KOR	Yoo Chung-yoon
29	DF	KOR	Lee Won-kyu
30	MF	KOR	Jo Jae-cheol
31	GK	KOR	Kim Dong-jun
32	MF	KOR	Yeon Je-woon
33	DF	KOR	Jang Hak-young
34	MF	KOR	Park In-woo
35	FW	KOR	Lee Beom-soo
36	DF	KOR	Kim Myung-soo
37	DF	KOR	Kwon Hyun-joon
38	FW	KOR	Choi Myung-jin
39	MF	KOR	Park Jae-woo
40	FW	KOR	Moon Chang-hyun

=== Out on loan & military service ===
Note: Flags indicate national team as defined under FIFA eligibility rules; some limited exceptions apply. Players may hold more than one non-FIFA nationality.

No.	Pos.	Nation	Player
—	MF	COL	Javier Reina (to Colo-Colo)

No.	Pos.	Nation	Player
—	DF	KOR	Park Jin-po (to Sangju Sangmu)
—	MF	KOR	Lee Chang-hoon (to Sangju Sangmu)
—	MF	KOR	Kim Seong-jun (to Sangju Sangmu)
—	FW	KOR	Nam Joon-jae (to Ansan Police)

== Competitions ==
=== Overview ===
Competition	Record							
Competition	G	W	D	L	GF	GA	GD	Win %
K League Classic	38	11	10	17	47	51	−4	28.95
KFA Cup	3	2	1	0	4	1	+3	66.67
Total	41	13	11	17	51	52	−1	31.71

Updated to match played 31 December 2016
Source: Competitions

=== K League Classic ===
Pos	Team	Pld	W	D	L	GF	GA	GD	Pts	Qualification or relegation
10	Incheon United	38	11	12	15	43	51	−8	45	
11	Seongnam FC (R)	38	11	10	17	47	51	−4	43	Qualification for relegation play-offs
12	Suwon FC (R)	38	10	9	19	40	58	−18	39	Relegation to K League Challenge

Source: K League
Rules for classification: 1) Points; 2) Goals scored; 3) Goal difference; 4) Wins; 5) Head-to-head points
(R) Relegated

==== Regular season ====
Win Draw Loss Upcoming fixture

12 March 2016 1	Seongnam FC	2–0	Suwon Samsung Bluewings	Seongnam
12:00 KST	Kim Do-heon 48'; Tiago Alves 55'; Pitu (yellow card) 87'	Report	Yang Sang-min (yellow card) 10'	Stadium: Tancheon Stadium; Attendance: 14,504; Referee: Kim Jong-hyeok

19 March 2016 2	Suwon FC	1–1	Seongnam FC	Suwon
13:00 KST	Kim Han-won (yellow card) 39'; Hwang Jae-hun (yellow card) 59'; Kim Byung-oh 65'; Adžić (yellow card) 90+1'	Report	Yun Young-sun (yellow card) 51'; Tiago Alves 60'	Stadium: Suwon Sports Complex; Attendance: 12,825; Referee: Lee Dong-jun

2 April 2016 3	Seongnam FC	1–0	Pohang Steelers	Seongnam
12:00 KST	Tiago Alves 68'; Lee Jong-won (yellow card) 88'	Report	Park Sun-ju (yellow card) 90+1'; Bae Seul-Ki (yellow card) 90+4'	Stadium: Tancheon Stadium; Attendance: 7,312; Referee: Woo Sang-il

9 April 2016 4	Incheon United	2–3	Seongnam FC	Incheon
14:00 KST	Song Je-heon 42' (pen.); Oris 65'; Jonjić (yellow card) 79'	Report	Hwang Ui-jo 5', 21'; Tiago Alves 67'	Stadium: Incheon Football Stadium; Attendance: 2,850; Referee: Kim Sang-woo

13 April 2016 5	Seongnam FC	0–0	Jeonnam Dragons	Seongnam
12:00 KST	Lee Jong-won (yellow card) 21'	Report	Kim Young-wook (yellow card) 19'; Lee Ji-min (yellow card) 37'; Ahn Yong-woo (yellow card) 43'	Stadium: Tancheon Stadium; Attendance: 5,115; Referee: Park Pil-jun

16 April 2016 6	Jeonbuk Hyundai Motors	3–2	Seongnam FC	Jeonju
13:00 KST	Ricardo Lopes 13'; Choi Chul-soon (yellow card) 41'; Lim Jong-eun (yellow card) 55'; Leonardo 69'; Kim Bo-kyung 86'; Lee Dong-gook (yellow card) 90+2'	Report	Lee Jong-won (yellow card) 23'; Jo Jae-cheol 55'; Kim Tae-yoon (yellow card) 60'; Tiago Alves 76'	Stadium: Jeonju World Cup Stadium; Attendance: 8,022; Referee: Kim Dong-jin

23 April 2016 7	Jeju United	2–2	Seongnam FC	Jeju City
12:00 KST	Lee Keun-ho 59', 67'	Report	Park Yong-ji 36'; Kim Do-heon 55'; Jang Suk-won (yellow card) 71'	Stadium: Jeju World Cup Stadium; Attendance: Kim Sung-ho; Referee: 4,672

1 May 2016 8	Seongnam FC	2–0	Gwangju FC	Seongnam
14:00 KST	Lee Jong-won (yellow card) 22' (yellow card) 90+6' (red card); Tiago Alves 60'; Jo Jae-cheol (yellow card) 74'; Kim Do-heon (yellow card) 78'; Hwang Ui-jo 80'	Report	Jung Dong-yoon (yellow card) 11'; Jo Seong-joon (yellow card) 27'	Stadium: Tancheon Stadium; Attendance: 7,478; Referee: Jung Dong-sik

5 May 2016 9	Ulsan Hyundai	0–3	Seongnam FC	Ulsan
12:00 KST	Masuda (yellow card) 25'	Report	Yun Young-sun 30'; An Sang-hyun (yellow card) 42'; Hwang Ui-jo 49'; Garcia 53'	Stadium: Ulsan Munsu Football Stadium; Attendance: 11,319; Referee: Ko Hyung-jin

14 May 2016 10	Seongnam FC	2–3	FC Seoul	Seongnam
14:00 KST	Kim Tae-yoon 17'; Tiago Alves 31'; Lee Jong-won (yellow card) 50'; Yun Young-sun (yellow card) 56'; An Sang-hyun (yellow card) 65'; Jang Hak-young (yellow card) 90+1'	Report	Ju Se-jong 3', 71'; Kim Nam-chun (yellow card) 20'; Adriano 51'; Takahagi (yellow card) 79'	Stadium: Tancheon Stadium; Attendance: 12,043; Referee: Park Pil-jun

21 May 2016 11	Sangju Sangmu	2–3	Seongnam FC	Sangju
12:00 KST	Lim Sang-hyub 10'; Park Jin-po (yellow card) 28'; Cho Young-cheol 48'; Park Gi-dong (yellow card) 77'	Report	Tiago Alves 19', 32'; Kim Dong-jun (yellow card) 34'; Lee Woong-hee 57' (o.g.); Yun Young-sun (yellow card) 66'	Stadium: Sangju Civic Stadium; Attendance: 1,382; Referee: Lee Dong-jun

28 May 2016 12	Seongnam FC	0–1	Incheon United	Seongnam
12:00 KST	Kim Tae-yoon (yellow card) 38'; Lim Chae-min (yellow card) 88'	Report	Park Se-jik (yellow card) 16'; Oris 79'; Jo Su-huk (yellow card) 90+1'; Kim Yong-hwan (yellow card) 90+3'	Stadium: Tancheon Stadium; Attendance: 7,712; Referee: Kim Dong-jin

12 June 2016 13	Seongnam FC	2–2	Jeonbuk Hyundai Motors	Seongnam
17:00 KST	An Sang-hyun (yellow card) 17'; Tiago Alves 75', 90+5'	Report	Choi Jae-soo (yellow card) 14'; Choi Chul-soon (yellow card) 46'; Choi Kyu-baek (yellow card) 51'; Leonardo 83', 90+1' (pen.); Lim Jong-eun (yellow card) 88'	Stadium: Tancheon Stadium; Attendance: 9,018; Referee: Woo Sang-Il

15 June 2016 14	Pohang Steelers	3–1	Seongnam FC	Pohang
17:30 KST	Hwang Ui-jo 12' (o.g.); Kim Jun-su (yellow card) 13'; Kang Sang-woo (yellow card) 58'; Yang Dong-hyun 60'; Lee Gwang-hyeok (yellow card) 64'; Shim Dong-woon 86' (yellow card) 86'	Report	Kwak Hae-sung (yellow card) 20'; Park Yong-ji (yellow card) 61'; Jo Jae-cheol 65' (yellow card) 65'	Stadium: Pohang Steel Yard; Attendance: 5,209; Referee: Kim Jong-hyeok

19 June 2016 15	Gwangju FC	1–1	Seongnam FC	Gwangju
17:00 KST	Yeo Reum 2'; Choi Bong-jin (yellow card) 66'; Lee Chan-dong (yellow card) 77'; Jung Jo-gook (yellow card) 79'; Jeong Ho-jeong (yellow card) 86'; Kim Young-bin (yellow card) 90+4'	Report	Jang Hak-young (yellow card) 18'; Pitu 70'	Stadium: Gwangju World Cup Stadium; Attendance: 3,044; Referee: Kim Sung-ho

26 June 2016 16	Seongnam FC	0-1	Ulsan Hyundai	Seongnam
17:00 KST	Yun Young-sun (yellow card) 90+4'	Report	Seo Jung-jin (yellow card) 4'; Jeong Seung-hyun (yellow card) 66'; Kim Tae-hwan 90' (pen.)	Stadium: Tancheon Stadium; Attendance: 5,545; Referee: (South Korea) Kim Sang-woo (referee)

29 June 2016 17	FC Seoul	1-3	Seongnam FC	Seoul
17:30 KST	Adriano 13' (red card) 74'; Kim Dong-woo (yellow card) 51'; Go Yo-han (yellow card) 76'	Report	Tiago Alves Sales 19'; Lee Jong-won (yellow card) 26'; Hwang Ui-jo 33'; Yu Sang-hun 53' (o.g.)	Stadium: Seoul World Cup Stadium; Attendance: 7,865; Referee: (South Korea) Woo Sang-il

2 July 2016 18	Jeonnam Dragons	0-1	Seongnam FC	Gwangyang
17:00 KST	Ko Tae-won (yellow card) 90'	Report	Tiago Alves Sales 43'; Lee Tae-hee (yellow card) 63'; Yun Young-sun (yellow card) 90+2'	Stadium: Gwangyang Football Stadium; Attendance: 1,918; Referee: (South Korea) Park Pil-jun

10 July 2016 19	Seongnam FC	2-3	Sangju Sangmu	Seongnam
17:00 KST	Yeon Je-woon (yellow card) 2' (goal) 36'; Kim Do-heon (yellow card) 3' (yellow-red card); Hwang Ui-jo 60'	Report	Kim Sung-hwan 20' (pen.) 90+2'; Park Jun-tae 45+1'	Stadium: Tancheon Stadium; Attendance: 6,021; Referee: (South Korea) Kim Jong-hyeok

17 July 2016 20	Suwon Samsung Bluewings	1-2	Seongnam FC	Suwon
17:00 KST	Lee Sang-ho (yellow card) 65'; Santos 71'	Report	Kim Hyun 33'; Yeon Je-woon (yellow card) 45'; Lee Hoo-kwon (yellow card) 70'; Jo Jae-cheol 73'	Stadium: Suwon World Cup Stadium; Attendance: 12,086; Referee: (South Korea) Lee Dong-Jun

20 July 2016 21	Seongnam FC	0-0	Jeju United	Seongnam
17:30 KST	Lee Hoo-kwon (yellow card) 88'	Report	Baek Dong-kyu (yellow card) 90+2'	Stadium: Tancheon Stadium; Attendance: 5,031; Referee: (South Korea) Kim Dong-jin (referee)

24 July 2016 22	Seongnam FC	1-2	Suwon FC	Seongnam
17:00 KST	Hwang Jin-sung 80'	Report	Kwon Young-hyun 63' (pen.) (yellow card) 70'; Lim Chang-gyoon 68' (yellow card) 83'	Stadium: Tancheon Stadium; Attendance: 11,127; Referee: (South Korea) Park Pil-Jun

31 July 2016 23	Incheon United	2-2	Seongnam FC	Incheon
16:00 KST	Kim Do-hyuk 21'; Oris (yellow card) 47' (goal) 56'	Report	Lee Tae-hee (yellow card) 21'; Sung Bong-jae 39'; Kim Do-heon 70' (yellow card) 73'; Yeon Je-woon (yellow card) 90+4'	Stadium: Incheon Football Stadium; Attendance: 3,986; Referee: (South Korea) Kim Jong-hyeok

3 August 2016 27	Seongnam FC	1-2	FC Seoul	Seongnam
17:30 KST	Silvinho 15'; Lim Chae-min (yellow card) 38'	Report	Lee Kyu-ro (yellow card) 22'; Takahagi (yellow card) 42'; Damjanović 73' 80'	Stadium: Tancheon Stadium; Attendance: 5,779; Referee: (South Korea) Song Min-Seok

10 August 2016 24	Seongnam FC	2-0	Jeonnam Dragons	Seongnam
17:30 KST	Hwang Ui-jo 45+1' (yellow card) 67'; Silvinho 62'; Kim Do-heon (yellow card) 66'	Report	Jugović (yellow card) 26'	Stadium: Tancheon Stadium; Attendance: 5,863; Referee: (South Korea) Jung Dong-Sik

13 August 2016 25	Sangju Sangmu	2-2	Seongnam FC	Sangju
17:00 KST	Park Hee-seong 61'; Lee Jae-myung (yellow card) 86'; Park Gi-dong 88'	Report	Lim Chae-min (yellow card) 18'; Hwang Ui-jo 33'; Jang Hak-young (yellow card) 48'; Kim Tae-yoon (yellow card) 55'; Pitu (yellow card) 64'; Jung Seon-ho 68'; Choi Ho-jung (yellow card) 87'	Stadium: Sangju Civic Stadium; Attendance: 1,412; Referee: (South Korea) Woo Sang-Il

17 August 2016 26	Seongnam FC	0-1	Gwangju FC	Seongnam
17:30 KST	Jang Suk-won (yellow card) 54'; Yeon Je-woon (yellow card) 67'; Kim Hyun (yellow card) 85'	Report	Park Jun-hyuk 53' (o.g.); Jeong Dong-yun (yellow card) 85'	Stadium: Tancheon Stadium; Attendance: 3,735; Referee: (South Korea) Park Pil-Jun

27 August 2016 28	Jeju United	1–0	Seongnam FC	Jeju City
17:00 KST	Ahn Hyeon-beom (yellow card) 90'	Report		Stadium: Jeju World Cup Stadium

10 September 2016 29	Seongnam FC	1–2	Suwon Samsung Bluewings	Seongnam
14:00 KST		Report		Stadium: Tancheon Stadium

17 September 2016 30	Seongnam FC	2–1	Suwon FC	Seongnam
12:00 KST		Report		Stadium: Tancheon Stadium

21 September 2016 31	Ulsan Hyundai	2–1	Seongnam FC	Ulsan
17:30 KST		Report		Stadium: Ulsan Munsu Football Stadium

24 September 2016 32	Jeonbuk Hyundai Motors	1–0	Seongnam FC	Jeonju
12:00 KST		Report		Stadium: Jeonju World Cup Stadium

2 October 2016 33	Seongnam FC	1–4	Pohang Steelers	Seongnam
12:00 KST		Report		Stadium: Tancheon Stadium

==== After Split ====
16 October 2016 34	Seongnam FC	0–0	Incheon United	Seongnam
15:00 KST		Report		Stadium: Tancheon Stadium; Attendance: 3440

22 October 2016 35	Suwon Samsung Bluewings	2–0	Seongnam FC	Suwon
15:00 KST	Johnathan (yellow card) 24'; Kwon Chang-Hoon 73'	Report		Stadium: Suwon World Cup Stadium; Attendance: 5013

29 October 2016 36	Gwangju FC	0–0	Seongnam FC	Gwangju
15:00 KST		Report		Stadium: Gwangju World Cup Stadium; Attendance: 1146

2 November 2016 37	Seongnam FC	1–2	Suwon FC	Seongnam
19:30 KST	Kim Do-heon 85'	Report	Kim Jong-gook 25'; Yeon Je-woon 82' (o.g.)	Stadium: Tancheon Stadium; Attendance: 2968

5 November 2016 38	Pohang Steelers	1–0	Seongnam FC	Pohang
15:00 KST	Yang Dong-hyun 27'	Report		Stadium: Pohang Steel Yard; Attendance: 4738

==== 2016 K League Promotion-Relegation Playoffs ====
17 November 2016 1st leg	Gangwon FC	0–0	Seongnam FC	Gangneung
19:00 KST		Report		Stadium: Gangneung Stadium; Attendance: 3039; Referee: Kim Hee-gon

20 November 2016 2nd leg	Seongnam FC	1–1	Gangwon FC	Seongnam
15:00 KST	Hwang Jin-sung 77'	Report	Heo Beom-san 42'	Stadium: Tancheon Stadium; Attendance: 6548; Referee: Kim Seong-ho

Seongnam FC relegated to 2017 K League Challenge, due to 1:1 on aggregate with Away goals rule.

==== Results summary ====
Overall								Home						Away					
Pld	W	D	L	GF	GA	GD	Pts	W	D	L	GF	GA	GD	W	D	L	GF	GA	GD
15	6	5	4	25	20	+5	23	3	2	2	9	6	+3	3	3	2	16	14	+2

Last updated: 19 June 2016.
Source: Competitive matches

=== Korean FA Cup ===
Win Draw Loss Upcoming fixture

11 May 2016 Last 32	Seongnam FC	1–0	Yeungnam University	Seongnam
17:30 KST		Report		Stadium: Tancheon Stadium

22 June 2016 Last 16	Seongnam FC	2-0	Sungkyunkwan University	Seongnam
19:30 UTC+09:00	Jo Jae-cheol 69'; Sung Bong-jae 79'	Summary	Hyun-Sung Hong (yellow card) 66'	Stadium: Tancheon Stadium; Referee: (South Korea) Jo Ji-Im

13 July 2016 Quarter Final	Suwon Samsung Bluewings	1-1 (a.e.t.) (4-3 p)	Seongnam FC	Suwon
19:30 UTC+09:00	Lee Jong-sung (yellow card) 7' (yellow-red card); Ko Cha-won 24'; Koo Ja-ryong (yellow card) 32' (yellow-red card)	Summary	Kim Tae-yoon (red card) 19'; Kim Do-heon (yellow card) 30'; An Sang-hyun (yellow card) 37'; Lee Tae-hee (yellow card) 77'; Garcia 84'; Lee Jong-won (yellow card) 107'	Stadium: Suwon World Cup Stadium; Referee: (South Korea) Song Min-Seok
