= Oh Do-hyun =

South Korean footballer (born 1994)

Personal information
- Full name: Oh Do-hyun
- Date of birth: 6 December 1994 (age 31)
- Place of birth: South Korea
- Height: 1.86 m (6 ft 1 in)
- Position: Defender

Team information
- Current team: Seongnam FC

Youth career
- 2010–2012: Gwangju FC

Senior career*
Years	Team	Apps	(Gls)
2013–2016	Gwangju FC	71	(0)
2017–	Seongnam FC		
2017	→ Pohang Steelers (loan)		

International career
2010	South Korea U-17		
- * Club domestic league appearances and goals as of 7 January 2018

Oh Do-hyun (Korean: 오도현; born 6 December 1994) is a South Korean footballer who plays as defender for Seongnam FC.

== Career ==
He was selected by Gwangju FC in the 2013 K League draft.

On 19 January 2017, Seongnam FC announced Oh Do-hyun as the new signing ahead of 2017 Seongnam FC season.
