= Kim Do-heon =

South Korean footballer (born 1982)

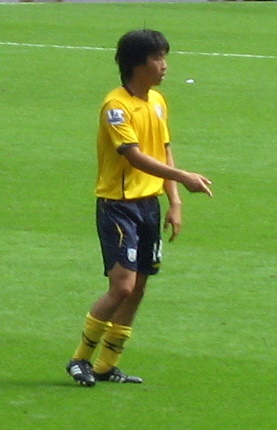
- Kim with West Bromwich Albion in 2008

Personal information
- Date of birth: 14 July 1982 (age 44)
- Place of birth: Dongducheon, Gyeonggi, South Korea
- Height: 1.75 m (5 ft 9 in)
- Positions: Attacking midfielder; wingback

Senior career*
| Years | Team | Apps | (Gls) |
| 2001–2005 | Suwon Samsung Bluewings | 85 | (7) |
| 2005–2008 | Seongnam Ilhwa Chunma | 70 | (15) |
| 2008 | → West Bromwich Albion (loan) | 4 | (1) |
| 2008–2009 | West Bromwich Albion | 16 | (0) |
| 2009–2014 | Suwon Samsung Bluewings | 73 | (11) |
| 2011–2012 | → Korean Police (draft) | 0 | (0) |
| 2015–2017 | Seongnam FC | 88 | (14) |
| 2018 | Negeri Sembilan | 18 | (0) |
| 2019 | Indy Eleven | 7 | (1) |
| Total | | 361 | (49) |

International career
| 1998 | South Korea U17 | 4 | (0) |
| 2002–2006 | South Korea U23 | 43 (Note: Includes four appearances as an overage player in Asian Games.) | (3) |
| 2003–2012 | South Korea | 62 | (12) |

Managerial career
- 2020: Suwon Samsung Bluewings (assistant)
- 2021–2023: Jeonbuk Hyundai Motors (assistant)
- 2023: Jeonbuk Hyundai Motors (caretaker)
- 2024: Chengdu Rongcheng (assistant)
- 2024: Jeonbuk Hyundai Motors
- 2026–: Vietnam (assistant)
Medal record
Representing South Korea
Men's football
AFC Asian Cup
| Bronze medal – third place | 2007 Indonesia/Malaysia /Thailand/Vietnam | Team |
Asian Games
| Bronze medal – third place | 2002 Busan | Team |
EAFF Championship
| Gold medal – first place | 2003 Japan | Team |
| Silver medal – second place | 2010 Japan | Team |
- * Club domestic league appearances and goals

- Kim Do-heon
- Hangul: 김두현
- Hanja: 金斗炫
- RR: Gim Duhyeon
- MR: Kim Tuhyŏn

Kim Do-heon (Korean: 김두현, Korean pronunciation: [kim.du.ɦjʌŋ]; born 14 July 1982) is a South Korean football coach and former player who is currently an assistant manager for Vietnam.

== Club career ==
Kim played for Suwon Samsung Bluewings and Seongnam Ilhwa Chunma before joining West Bromwich Albion. He led each team's K League title, and his technical abilities was likened to Paul Scholes in South Korea.

Kim spent a few days on trial at West Brom in December 2007, and could be loaned to the club from February with an option for a permanent switch at the end of the season. He scored his first goal for West Brom in the final match of the season against Queens Park Rangers, eight minutes after coming on as a second-half substitute. West Brom went on to win 2–0, securing them the Football League Championship title and promotion to the Premier League.

On 28 May, he completed the move to West Brom for £550,000. Kim made his Premier League debut on 16 August 2008 against Arsenal, where they lost the match 1–0. He scored once after the permanent move, in a 2–2 draw with Burnley in the FA Cup on 24 January 2009. After one and a half years in West Bromwich, he returned to South Korea.

Near the end of his playing career, he played for Malaysia Super League side Negeri Sembilan, and USL Championship side Indy Eleven.

== International career ==
Kim played as a main playmaker for the national under-23 team in 2004 Summer Olympics, 2002 and 2006 Asian Games, whereas he was criticised for his unstable performance in senior team. It was his biggest desire to play in the FIFA World Cup, but he finally could not appear in a World Cup match. While he was a member of South Korea's squad for the 2006 FIFA World Cup, he had to watch his team's matches on the bench.

On 14 June 2008, Kim accomplished his first international hat-trick in a World Cup qualifier against Turkmenistan.

== Personal life ==
Kim is married to Jung Hye-won, who gave birth to their son on 12 August 2008. He delayed his return to Korea to visit his son for the first time, in order to participate in the opening games of the 2008–09 Premier League season.

== Career statistics ==
=== Club ===
Appearances and goals by club, season and competition
| Club | Season | League | | | National cup | | League cup | | Continental | | Other | | Total | |
| Club | Season | Division | Apps | Goals | Apps | Goals | Apps | Goals | Apps | Goals | Apps | Goals | Apps | Goals |
|---|---|---|---|---|---|---|---|---|---|---|---|---|---|---|
| Suwon Samsung Bluewings | 2001 | K League | 12 | 0 | ? | ? | 3 | 0 | ? | ? | — | | 15 | 0 |
| Suwon Samsung Bluewings | 2002 | K League | 16 | 2 | ? | ? | 4 | 0 | ? | ? | — | | 20 | 2 |
| Suwon Samsung Bluewings | 2003 | K League | 34 | 4 | 1 | 0 | — | | — | | — | | 35 | 4 |
| Suwon Samsung Bluewings | 2004 | K League | 22 | 1 | 0 | 0 | 0 | 0 | — | | — | | 22 | 1 |
| Suwon Samsung Bluewings | 2005 | K League | 1 | 0 | 0 | 0 | 8 | 1 | 6 | 1 | 4 (Note: Three appearances in A3 Champions Cup, one appearance in Korean Super Cup) | 0 | 19 | 2 |
| Suwon Samsung Bluewings | Total | | 85 | 7 | 1 | 0 | 15 | 1 | 6 | 1 | 4 | 0 | 111 | 9 |
| Seongnam Ilhwa Chunma | 2005 | K League | 20 | 2 | 1 | 0 | 0 | 0 | — | | — | | 21 | 2 |
| Seongnam Ilhwa Chunma | 2006 | K League | 25 | 6 | 0 | 0 | 5 | 2 | — | | — | | 30 | 8 |
| Seongnam Ilhwa Chunma | 2007 | K League | 25 | 7 | 0 | 0 | 1 | 0 | 10 | 1 | 2 (Note: Appearances in A3 Champions Cup) | 0 | 38 | 8 |
| Seongnam Ilhwa Chunma | Total | | 70 | 15 | 1 | 0 | 6 | 2 | 10 | 1 | 2 | 0 | 89 | 18 |
| West Bromwich Albion (loan) | 2007–08 | Championship | 4 | 1 | 3 | 0 | 0 | 0 | — | | — | | 7 | 1 |
| West Bromwich Albion | 2008–09 | Premier League | 16 | 0 | 3 | 1 | 0 | 0 | — | | — | | 19 | 1 |
| Suwon Samsung Bluewings | 2009 | K League | 12 | 4 | 2 | 1 | 0 | 0 | 0 | 0 | — | | 14 | 5 |
| Suwon Samsung Bluewings | 2010 | K League | 16 | 2 | 3 | 0 | 3 | 1 | 4 | 0 | — | | 26 | 3 |
| Suwon Samsung Bluewings | 2012 | K League | 8 | 1 | 0 | 0 | 0 | 0 | — | | — | | 8 | 1 |
| Suwon Samsung Bluewings | 2013 | K League 1 | 6 | 1 | 0 | 0 | — | | 2 | 0 | — | | 8 | 1 |
| Suwon Samsung Bluewings | 2014 | K League 1 | 31 | 3 | 0 | 0 | — | | — | | — | | 31 | 3 |
| Suwon Samsung Bluewings | Total | | 73 | 11 | 5 | 1 | 3 | 1 | 6 | 0 | — | | 87 | 13 |
| Korean Police (draft) | 2011 | — | — | | — | | ? (Note: Appearance(s) in Korea National League Championship) | ? | — | | — | | ? | ? |
| Korean Police (draft) | 2012 | — | — | | — | | ? | ? | — | | — | | ? | ? |
| Korean Police (draft) | Total | | — | | — | | ? | ? | — | | — | | ? | ? |
| Seongnam FC | 2015 | K League 1 | 35 | 7 | 2 | 0 | — | | 8 | 2 | — | | 45 | 9 |
| Seongnam FC | 2016 | K League 1 | 28 | 4 | 2 | 0 | — | | — | | 2 (Note: Appearances in the K League relegation playoffs) | 0 | 32 | 4 |
| Seongnam FC | 2017 | K League 2 | 25 | 3 | 2 | 0 | — | | — | | — | | 27 | 3 |
| Seongnam FC | Total | | 88 | 14 | 6 | 0 | 0 | 0 | 8 | 2 | 2 | 0 | 104 | 16 |
| Negeri Sembilan | 2018 | Malaysia Super League | 18 | 0 | 1 | 0 | — | | — | | 5 (Note: Appearances in the Malaysia Challenge Cup) | 0 | 24 | 0 |
| Indy Eleven | 2019 | USL Championship | 7 | 1 | 0 | 0 | — | | — | | 0 | 0 | 7 | 1 |
| Career total | | | 361 | 49 | 20 | 2 | 24 | 4 | 30 | 4 | 13 | 0 | 448 | 59 |

=== International ===
Appearances and goals by national team and year
| National team | Year | Apps | Goals |
|---|---|---|---|
| South Korea | 2003 | 4 | 1 |
| South Korea | 2004 | 8 | 2 |
| South Korea | 2005 | 11 | 0 |
| South Korea | 2006 | 14 | 4 |
| South Korea | 2007 | 7 | 1 |
| South Korea | 2008 | 7 | 3 |
| South Korea | 2009 | 2 | 0 |
| South Korea | 2010 | 5 | 0 |
| South Korea | 2012 | 4 | 1 |
| Career total | | 62 | 12 |

List of international goals scored by Kim Do-heon
| No. | Date | Venue | Opponent | Score | Result | Competition |
|---|---|---|---|---|---|---|
| 1 | 4 December 2003 | National Stadium, Tokyo, Japan | Hong Kong | 1–0 | 3–1 | 2003 EAFF Championship |
| 2 | 9 June 2004 | Daejeon World Cup Stadium, Daejeon, South Korea | Vietnam | 2–0 | 2–0 | 2006 FIFA World Cup qualification |
| 3 | 17 November 2004 | Seoul World Cup Stadium, Seoul, South Korea | Maldives | 1–0 | 2–0 | 2006 FIFA World Cup qualification |
| 4 | 22 February 2006 | Al-Hamadaniah Stadium, Aleppo, Syria | Syria | 1–0 | 2–1 | 2007 AFC Asian Cup qualification |
| 5 | 23 May 2006 | Seoul World Cup Stadium, Seoul, South Korea | Senegal | 1–0 | 1–1 | Friendly |
| 6 | 16 August 2006 | Zhongshan Soccer Stadium, Taipei, Chinese Taipei | Chinese Taipei | 3–0 | 3–0 | 2007 AFC Asian Cup qualification |
| 7 | 6 September 2006 | Suwon World Cup Stadium, Suwon, South Korea | Chinese Taipei | 6–0 | 8–0 | 2007 AFC Asian Cup qualification |
| 8 | 15 July 2007 | Gelora Bung Karno Stadium, Jakarta, Indonesia | Bahrain | 1–0 | 1–2 | 2007 AFC Asian Cup |
| 9 | 14 June 2008 | Saparmurat Turkmenbashi Olympic Stadium, Ashgabat, Turkmenistan | Turkmenistan | 1–0 | 3–1 | 2010 FIFA World Cup qualification |
| 10 | 14 June 2008 | Saparmurat Turkmenbashi Olympic Stadium, Ashgabat, Turkmenistan | Turkmenistan | 2–1 | 3–1 | 2010 FIFA World Cup qualification |
| 11 | 14 June 2008 | Saparmurat Turkmenbashi Olympic Stadium, Ashgabat, Turkmenistan | Turkmenistan | 3–1 | 3–1 | 2010 FIFA World Cup qualification |
| 12 | 30 May 2012 | Stade de Suisse, Bern, Switzerland | Spain | 1–1 | 1–4 | Friendly |

== Honours ==
=== Vietnam ===
Assistant Manager

- ASEAN Championship: 2026

Suwon Samsung Bluewings

- K League 1: 2004
- Korean FA Cup: 2002, 2009
- Korean League Cup: 2001, 2005
- Korean Super Cup: 2005
- Asian Club Championship: 2000–01, 2001–02
- Asian Super Cup: 2001, 2002
- A3 Champions Cup: 2005
- Pan-Pacific Championship: 2009

Seongnam Ilhwa Chunma

- K League 1: 2006
- Korean League Cup runner-up: 2006

West Bromwich Albion

- Football League Championship: 2007–08

South Korea U23

- Asian Games bronze medal: 2002

South Korea

- AFC Asian Cup third place: 2007
- EAFF Championship: 2003

Individual

- K League All-Star: 2004, 2005, 2006, 2007, 2010, 2014, 2015
- K League 1 Best XI: 2004, 2005, 2006, 2007
- K League 1 Most Valuable Player: 2006
- Korean FA Goal of the Year: 2006
- K League Players' Player of the Year: 2007
