= Shim Je-hyeok =

South Korean footballer (born 1995)

Personal information
- Full name: Shim Je-hyeok
- Date of birth: 5 March 1995 (age 31)
- Place of birth: Seongnam, South Korea
- Height: 1.76 m (5 ft 9 1/2 in)
- Position: Forward

Team information
- Current team: Yangju Citizen FC

Youth career
- 2011–2013: FC Seoul

Senior career*
Years	Team	Apps	(Gls)
2014–2017	FC Seoul	17	(0)
2017	→ Seongnam FC (loan)	23	(0)
2018	Gyeongju KHNP	4	(2)
2019	Gimhae City FC	4	(0)
2021	Hwaseong FC	16	(1)
2022-	Yangju Citizen FC	11	(0)

International career^{‡}
2013–2014	South Korea U-20	8	(1)
- * Club domestic league appearances and goals as of 25 October 2022 ‡ National team caps and goals as of 25 July 2015 (UTC)

Shim Je-hyeok (Korean: 심제혁; born March 5, 1995) is a South Korean football player who plays for Yangju Citizen FC.

== Club career ==
On 30 April 2014, Shim Je-hyeok scored a debut goal at a debut game against Incheon United.
