= Bae Sin-yeong =

Indonesian footballer

Personal information
- Full name: Bae Sin-yeong
- Date of birth: 11 June 1992 (age 34)
- Place of birth: Gimcheon, South Korea
- Height: 1.80 m (5 ft 11 in)
- Position: Defensive midfielder

Team information
- Current team: Dewa United Banten

Youth career
- 2004–2010: Ulsan Hyundai
- 2011–2014: Dankook University

Senior career*
Years	Team	Apps	(Gls)
2015–2021	Suwon	55	(5)
2016	→ Daegu (loan)	3	(0)
2018–2020	→ Gimcheon Sangmu (loan)	3	(0)
2021	Suphanburi	14	(0)
2021–2026	Persita Tangerang	144	(6)
2026–	Dewa United Banten	0	(0)
- * Club domestic league appearances and goals as of 16 May 2026

Bae Sin-yeong (Korean: 배신영; born 11 June 1992) is a professional footballer who plays as a defensive midfielder for Super League club Dewa United Banten.

== Career ==
He signed with K League 2 side Suwon in January 2015. On 17 June 2021, Bae Shin-yeong moved to Persita Tangerang in the Indonesian Liga 1. On 17 September, He made his competitive debut by starting in a 0–1 win at Persela Lamongan.
