= Jo Soo-chul =

South Korean footballer (born 1990)

Personal information
- Full name: Jo Soo-chul
- Date of birth: 30 October 1990 (age 36)
- Place of birth: South Korea
- Height: 1.78 m (5 ft 10 in)
- Position: Central midfielder

Team information
- Current team: Bucheon FC
- Number: 16

Youth career
- 2013–2014: Woosuk University

Senior career*
Years	Team	Apps	(Gls)
2013	Seongnam Ilhwa	0	(0)
2014–2015	Incheon United	33	(3)
2016	Pohang Steelers	14	(1)
2017–	Bucheon FC	85	(7)
2018–2019	→ Sangju Sangmu (army)	2	(0)
- * Club domestic league appearances and goals as of 11 January 2019

Jo Soo-chul (Korean: 조수철; born 30 October 1990) is a South Korean footballer who plays as centre midfielder for Bucheon FC in K League 2.

== Career ==
Jo joined Seongnam Ilhwa in before the 2013 season starts. But he made no appearances in his first professional team.

He moved to Incheon United in January 2014 and play his first professional match on 10 May against Jeonbuk.

He signed with Pohang Steelers in January 2016 after a contract dispute with Incheon.
