= Lee Geon-yeop =

South Korean footballer

Personal information
- Date of birth: 18 August 1994 (age 32)
- Height: 1.76 m (5 ft 9 in)
- Position: Forward

Team information
- Current team: Seongnam FC

Youth career
- 2010–2012: Boin High School
- 2013–2016: Seoul National Univ.

Senior career*
Years	Team	Apps	(Gls)
2017–	Seongnam FC	0	(0)
- * Club domestic league appearances and goals

Lee Geon-yeop (Korean: 이건엽; born 18 August 1994) is a South Korean footballer who plays for Seongnam FC.

On 28 December 2016, Seongnam FC announced 3 new recruits from 2017 open test, Lee Geon-yeop was one of the successful candidate. He is the first Professional football player from Seoul National University since Hwangbo Kwan(1988) and Yang Ik-jeon(1989).
