= Kim Yeong-nam (footballer) =

South Korean footballer (born 1991)

Personal information
- Full name: Kim Yeong-nam
- Date of birth: 24 March 1991 (age 35)
- Place of birth: South Korea
- Height: 1.78 m (5 ft 10 in)
- Position: Midfielder

Team information
- Current team: Ansan Greeners FC
- Number: 13

Youth career
- 2010–2011: Chung-Ang University

Senior career*
Years	Team	Apps	(Gls)
2012–2014	Seongnam FC	7	(0)
2015–2021	Bucheon FC	109	(7)
2017–2018	→ Asan Mugunghwa (army)	12	(0)
2021	Gyeongju HNP	13	(0)
2022–	Ansan Greeners FC	42	(0)
- * Club domestic league appearances and goals as of 15 November 2019

Kim Yeong-nam (Korean: 김영남; born 24 March 1991) is a South Korean footballer who plays as midfielder for Ansan Greeners FC in K League 2.

== Career ==
Kim Yeong-nam joined Seongnam Ilhwa in January 2012.
