= Lee Ji-min =

South Korean footballer

Personal information
- Full name: Lee Ji-min
- Date of birth: 4 September 1993 (age 33)
- Place of birth: South Korea
- Height: 1.73 m (5 ft 8 in)
- Position: Full back

Team information
- Current team: Busan IPark
- Number: 19

Youth career
- 2013–2014: Ajou University

Senior career*
Years	Team	Apps	(Gls)
2015–2016	Jeonnam Dragons	34	(2)
2017–2018	Seongnam FC	41	(1)
2019	Gimhae City FC	8	(1)
2020–	Busan IPark	2	(0)

International career^{‡}
2015–2016	South Korea U-23		
- * Club domestic league appearances and goals as of 28 November 2020 ‡ National team caps and goals as of 1 July 2016

Lee Ji-min (Korean: 이지민; born 4 September 1993) is a South Korean footballer who plays as full back for Busan IPark.

== Career ==
=== Club career ===
Lee played college football for Ajou University.

He joined Jeonnam Dragons in January 2015.

== Honours ==
=== International ===
South Korea U-23

- King's Cup: 2015
