= Cho Suk-jae =

South Korean footballer (born 1993)

Personal information
- Full name: Cho Suk-jae
- Date of birth: 24 March 1993 (age 33)
- Place of birth: South Korea
- Height: 1.80 m (5 ft 11 in)
- Positions: Striker; attacking midfielder

Youth career
- 2012–2014: Konkuk University

Senior career*
Years	Team	Apps	(Gls)
2015–2018	Jeonbuk Hyundai Motors	0	(0)
2015	→ Chungju Hummel (loan)	36	(19)
2016	→ Jeonnam Dragons (loan)	9	(1)
2017	→ FC Anyang (loan)	28	(7)
2018	→ Lokomotiv Tashkent (loan)	2	(0)
2018	Daegu FC	6	(0)

International career
2013–2014	South Korea U-20	11	(1)
- * Club domestic league appearances and goals as of 13 January 2019

Cho Suk-jae (Korean: 조석재; Hanja: 趙錫宰; born 24 March 1993) is a South Korean footballer who plays as a striker.

== Career ==
Cho joined Chungju Hummel on loan soon after signing with Jeonbuk Hyundai Motors in 2015. He made his first goal on 19 April against FC Anyang. In the 2016 season, he was loaned to the Jeonnam Dragons. After the season, he was loaned to FC Anyang during the 2017 season.

On 1 February 2018, Cho signed for Lokomotiv Tashkent.
