= Choi Ho-jung =

South Korean footballer

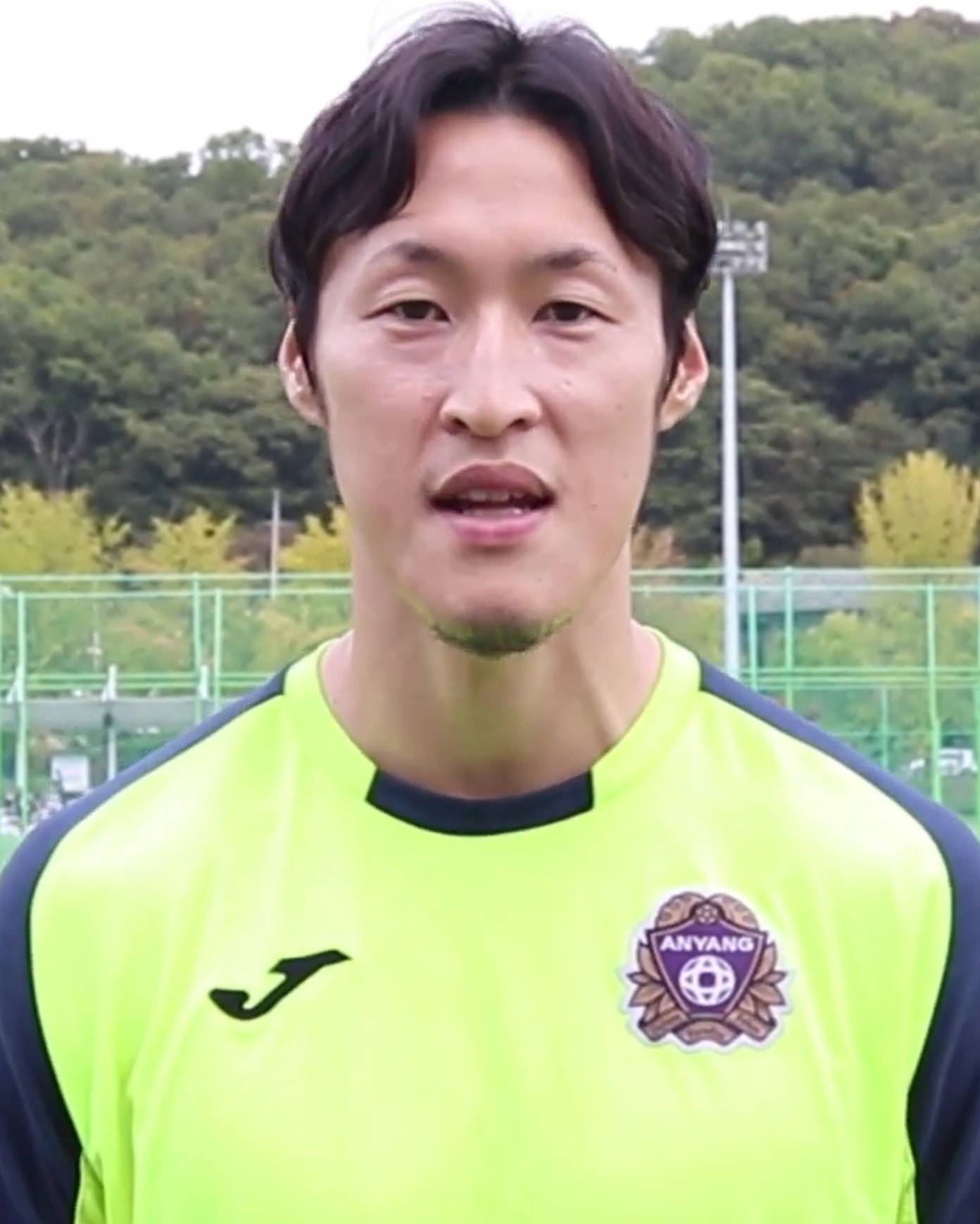
- Choi with FC Anyang in 2019

Personal information
- Full name: Choi Ho-jung
- Date of birth: 8 December 1989 (age 36)
- Place of birth: South Korea
- Height: 1.82 m (5 ft 11 1/2 in)
- Position: Midfielder

Team information
- Current team: Jeonnam Dragons
- Number: 55

Youth career
- 2007–2009: Kwandong University

Senior career*
| Years | Team | Apps | (Gls) |
| 2010–2016 | Daegu FC | 86 | (6) |
| 2014–2015 | → Sangju Sangmu (army) | 45 | (0) |
| 2016 | → Seongnam FC (loan) | 10 | (0) |
| 2017 | Seoul E-Land | 33 | (2) |
| 2018–2021 | FC Anyang | 85 | (0) |
| 2021– | Jeonnam Dragons | 19 | (1) |
- * Club domestic league appearances and goals as of 12 November 2019

- Choi Ho-jung
- Hangul: 최호정
- Hanja: 崔皓程
- RR: Choe Hojeong
- MR: Ch'oe Hojŏng

Choi Ho-jung (Korean: 최호정; born 8 December 1989) is a South Korean football player who plays for Jeonnam Dragons.

== Club career ==
Choi started his career at Daegu FC, joining in 2010 K League Draft. He made his debut in a match against Incheon United on 24 April 2010 and promptly earned himself a yellow card.

== Club career statistics ==
As of 16 December 2013

| Club performance | | | League | | Cup | | League Cup | | Total | |
| Season | Club | League | Apps | Goals | Apps | Goals | Apps | Goals | Apps | Goals |
| South Korea | | | League | | KFA Cup | | League Cup | | Total | |
|---|---|---|---|---|---|---|---|---|---|---|
| 2010 | Daegu FC | K League | 14 | 0 | 0 | 0 | 3 | 0 | 17 | 0 |
| 2011 | Daegu FC | K League | 6 | 0 | 0 | 0 | 2 | 0 | 8 | 0 |
| 2012 | Daegu FC | K League | 31 | 4 | 1 | 0 | – | | 32 | 4 |
| 2013 | Daegu FC | K League Classic | 25 | 1 | 0 | 0 | – | | 25 | 1 |
| Career total | | | 76 | 5 | 1 | 0 | 5 | 0 | 82 | 5 |

2024 apertura Champion Estudiantes F.C. Peñalolen Santiago
