= Kwak Hae-seong =

South Korean footballer

Personal information
- Date of birth: 6 December 1991 (age 34)
- Place of birth: South Korea
- Height: 1.80 m (5 ft 11 in)
- Position: Full back

Team information
- Current team: Bucheon FC 1995
- Number: 2

Youth career
- 2010–2013: Kwangwoon University

Senior career*
Years	Team	Apps	(Gls)
2014–2017	Seongnam FC	51	(1)
2016	→ Jeju United (loan)	8	(2)
2017–2019	Incheon United	4	(0)
2020–	Bucheon FC 1995		

International career
2011	South Korea U-20	1	(0)
2013–2014	South Korea U-23	5	(0)
Medal record
Representing South Korea
Men's football
Asian Games
Gold medal – first place	2014 Incheon	Team
- * Club domestic league appearances and goals as of 2 January 2018

- Kwak Hae-seong
- Hangul: 곽해성
- RR: Gwak Haeseong
- MR: Kwak Haesŏng

Kwak Hae-seong (Korean: 곽해성; born 6 December 1991) is a South Korean footballer who plays as full back for Incheon United.

== Career ==
He joined Seongnam FC in 2014.
