= Tancheon Sports Complex =

Sports Facilities in Seongnam, South Korea

Tancheon Stadium 탄천종합운동장 주경기장
- Fortress Tancheon
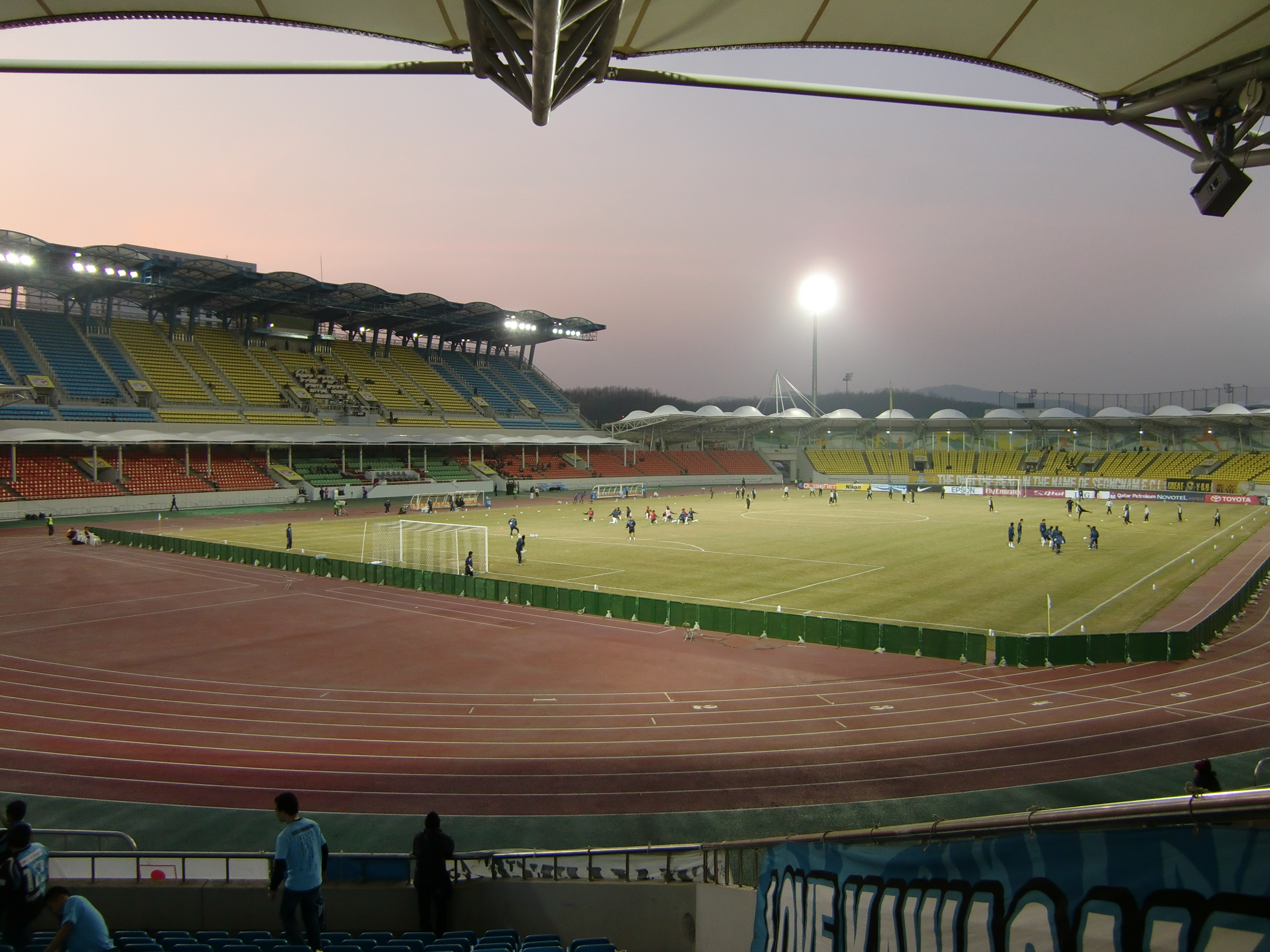
- Interactive map of Tancheon Stadium 탄천종합운동장 주경기장
- Former names: Seongnam 2 Sports Complex
- Location: 215, Tancheon-ro, Bundang-gu, Seongnam, Gyeonggi-do, South Korea
- Coordinates: 37.408614°N 127.122256°E
- Operator: Seongnam
- Capacity: 16,146
- Surface: Grass
- Field size: Site: 117,414 m^{2} (1,263,830 sq ft); Floor space: 29,220 m^{2} (314,500 sq ft)

Construction
- Groundbreaking: August 1997
- Opened: 1 April 2002
- Cost: 112.1 Billion KRW

Tenant
- Seongnam FC

Tancheon Sports Complex (Korean: 탄천종합운동장) is a group of sports facilities in Seongnam, South Korea. Its name was Seongnam 2 Sports Complex but changed to Tancheon Sports Complex in January 2006, naming after Tancheon. The complex consists of the Tancheon Stadium, Tancheon Baseball Stadium and a Sports Club. It is the home ground of K League 2 club Seongnam FC.

== Facilities ==
=== Tancheon Stadium ===
Tancheon Stadium is a multi-purpose stadium built in 2002 and currently used mostly for football matches and has been the home stadium of Seongnam FC since 2005, replacing the club's previous home, the Seongnam Sports Complex.

The first professional football match ever held was a friendly game between Seongnam Ilhwa Chunma and Poland national football team on 26 May 2002.

In 2009, Seongnam FC moved their home matches to Seongnam Sports Complex as the canopy installation works commenced. The installation was completed in 2010. The first match held since the installation was Seongnam FC's 2010 AFC Champions League game against Kawasaki Frontale on 23 February 2010.

On 12 March 2016, the stadium recorded its first ever K League sold-out match in Seongnam FC's 2016 K League Classic first-round game against Suwon Samsung Bluewings.

In the first half of 2019, Seongnam installed the nation's best large electronic display panel at Tancheon Stadium. Fan would be able to enjoy more vivid game scenes and halftime events at the stadium. In order to improve players' performance, the grass was completely replaced, and track and field tracks was also replaced with blue ones. The team's color was applied to the stadium with street lamp banners and branding using Tongcheon.

The stadium is nicknamed the Tancheon Fortress (Hangul: 탄천요새) reflecting Seongnam FC's strong home record in AFC Champions League.

The stadium has a Seongnam FC merchandise store near the west entrance.

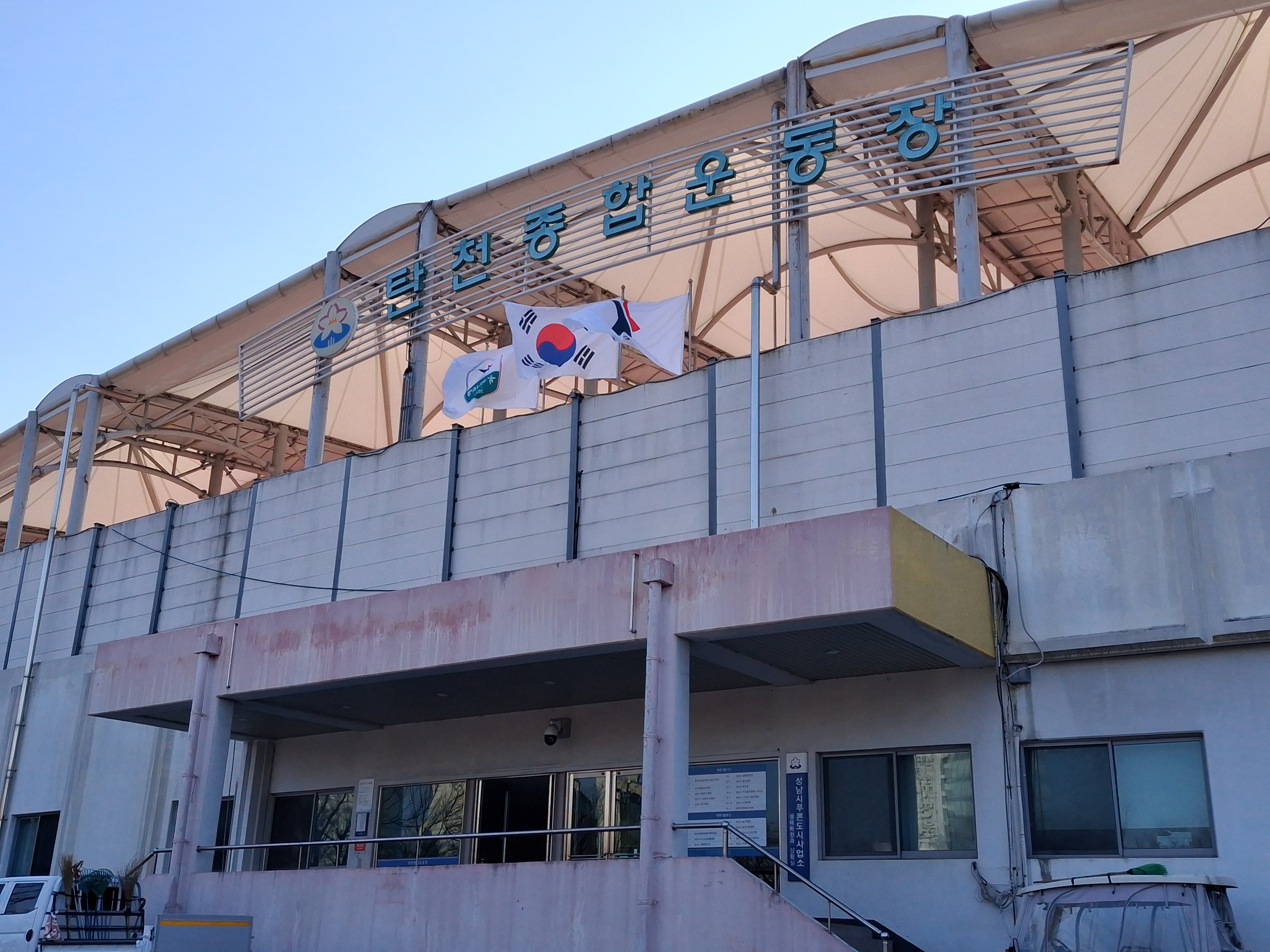
Tancheon Stadium old entrance

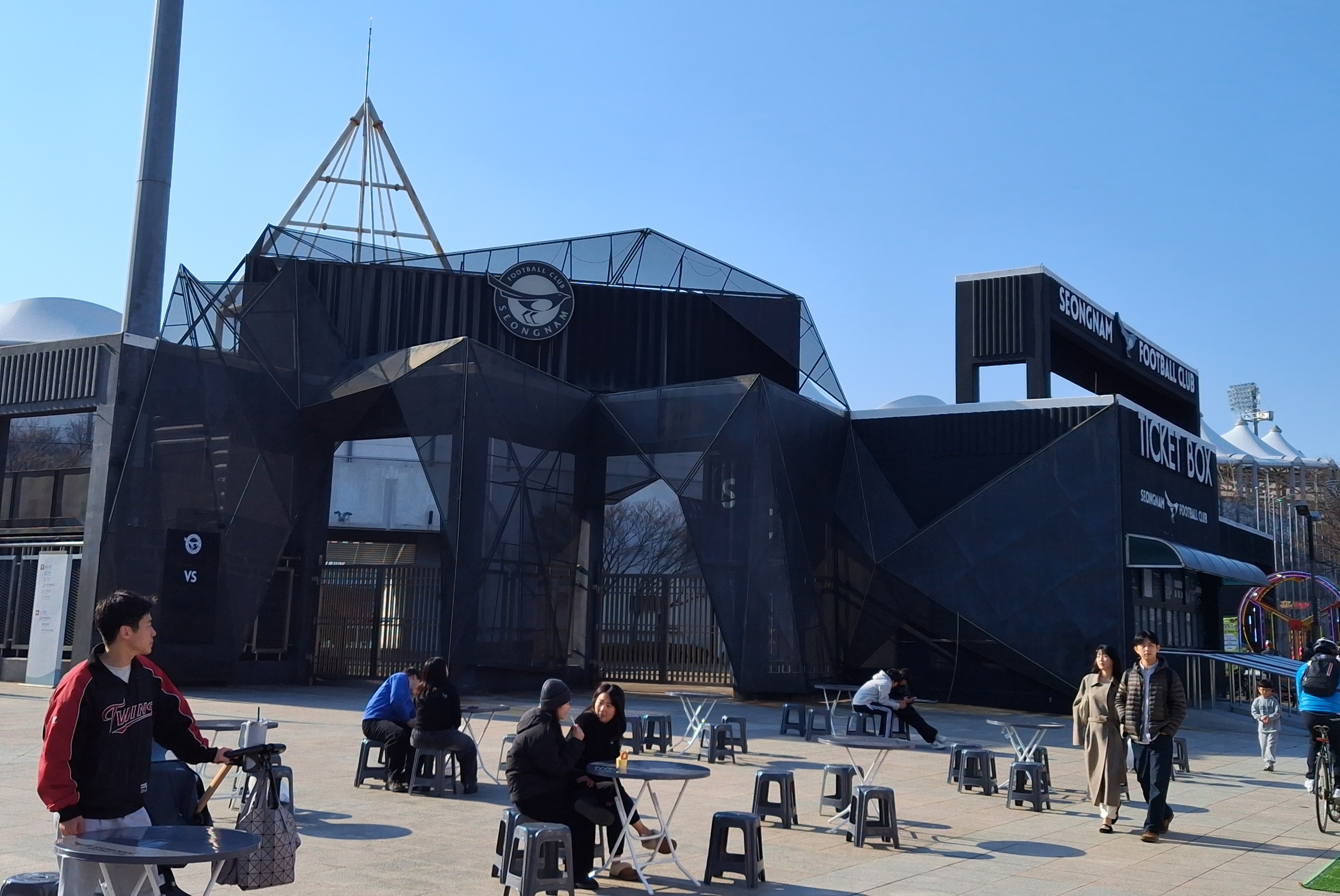
Tancheon Stadium east entrance

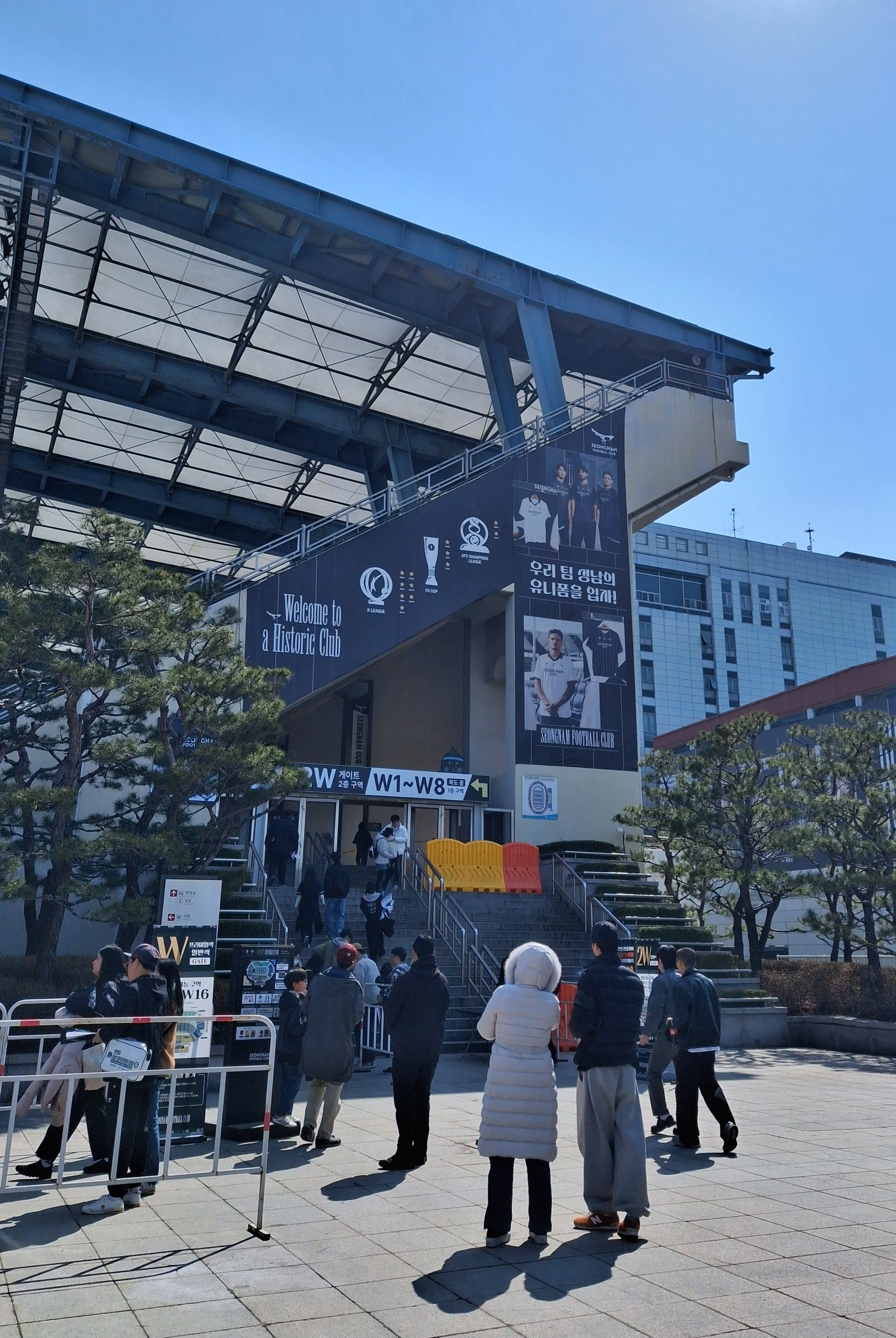
Tancheon Stadium second floor entrance

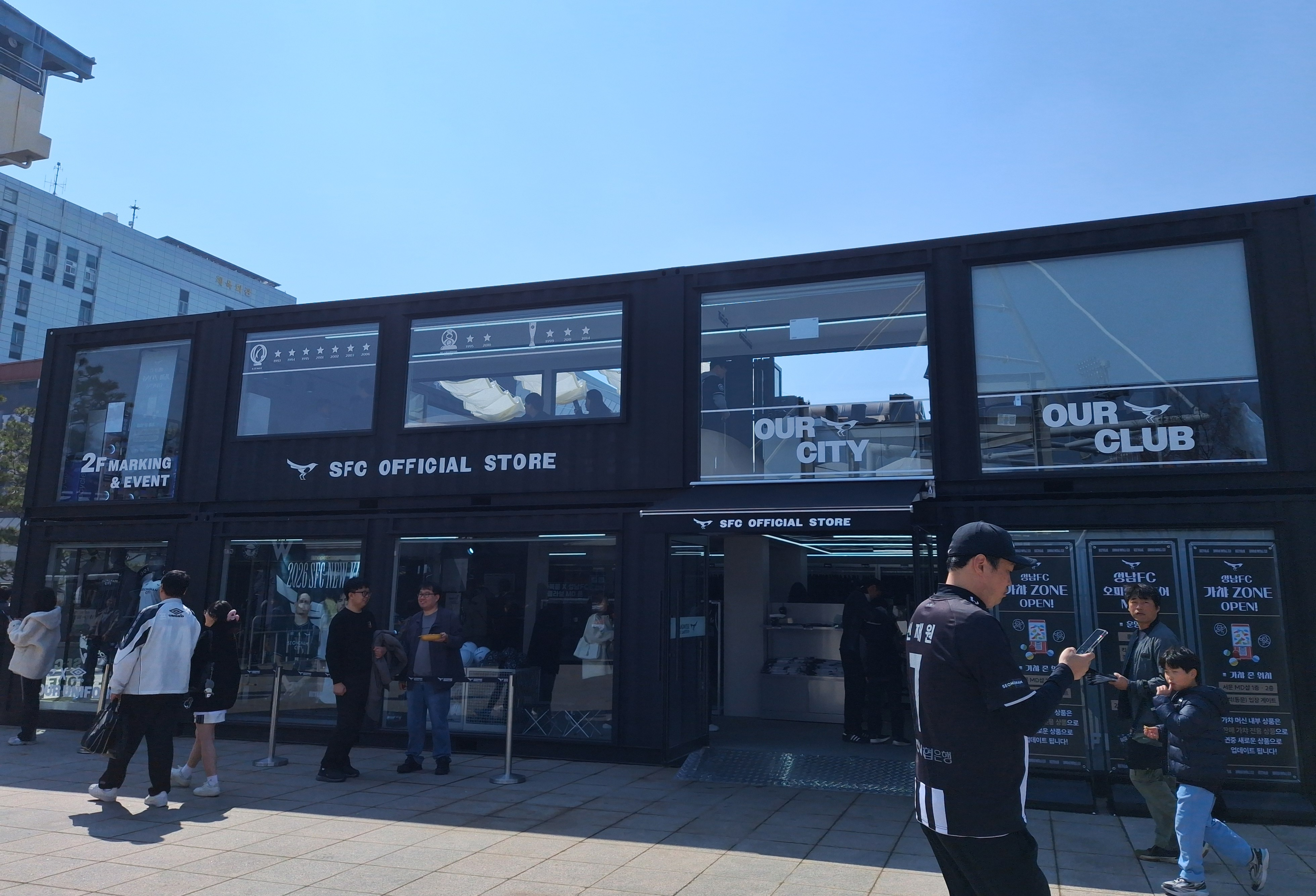
Seongnam FC merchandise store

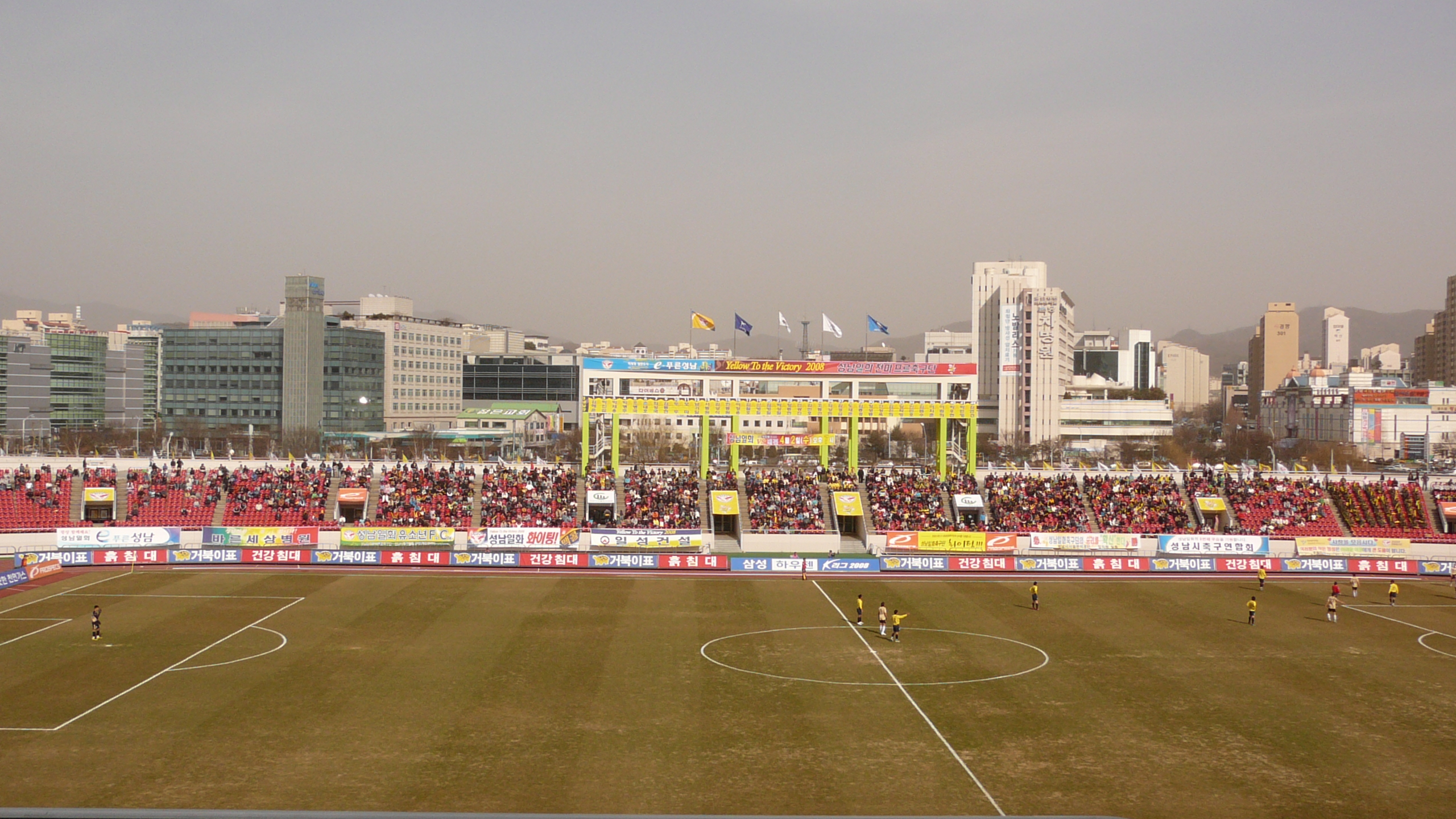
Seongnam FC fans at Tancheon Stadium

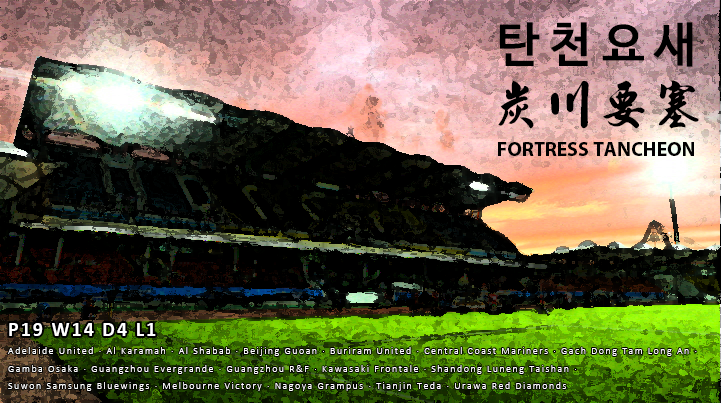
Tancheon Fortress, Tancheon's nickname

=== Tancheon Baseball Stadium ===
The stadium is equipped with AstroTurf and a stand with 955 seats. From Mondays to Saturdays, the stadium is mostly used by the city's high school baseball teams for home games and practices. For public use, applicants need to apply to a draw for empty time slots.

=== Tancheon Sports Club ===
The complex building includes swimming pool, squash court, aerobic exercise centre, ice rink, multi-purpose gym, health club, tennis court, bowling alley, and indoor golf facilities.

== In popular culture ==
In the quarantine camp scene in the South Korean disaster film, Flu (2013), infected persons are placed in plastic bags, with some of them still alive, thrown into a pit in Tancheon Stadium, and incinerated. Mir (Park Min-ha) is brought to the pit of bodies to be incinerated but is rescued by Kang Ji-goo (Jang Hyuk). The uninfected people see the pit, and a riot ensues, forcing the evacuation of all medical and military personnel from the camp.

== See also ==
- Lists of stadiums
