= Lee Hoo-kwon =

South Korean footballer (born 1990)

Lee Hoo-Kwon
Personal information
- Full name: Lee Hoo-Kwon
- Date of birth: 30 October 1990 (age 36)
- Place of birth: Pohang, Gyeongbuk, South Korea
- Height: 1.80 m (5 ft 11 in)
- Position: Midfielder

Team information
- Current team: Jeonnam Dragons
- Number: 6

Youth career
- 2007–2008: Kickers Offenbach
- 2010–2012: Kwangwoon University

Senior career*
Years	Team	Apps	(Gls)
2013–2016	Bucheon FC	37	(3)
2014–2015	→ Sangju Sangmu (army)	15	(0)
2016–2017	Seongnam FC	39	(1)
2018	Pohang Steelers	20	(0)
2019	Busan IPark	5	(0)
2019-	Jeonnam Dragons	10	(0)
- * Club domestic league appearances and goals as of 26 November 2019

Lee Hoo-Kwon (Korean: 이후권; born 30 October 1990) is a South Korean footballer who plays as midfielder for Jeonnam Dragons.

== Career ==
He was selected by Bucheon FC in the 2013 K League draft.
