= Jung Seon-ho =

South Korean footballer (born 1989)

Personal information
- Date of birth: 25 March 1989 (age 37)
- Place of birth: South Korea
- Height: 1.85 m (6 ft 1 in)
- Position: Midfielder

Team information
- Current team: Daegu FC
- Number: 8

Youth career
- 2008–2010: Dongeui University

Senior career*
Years	Team	Apps	(Gls)
2011–2012	Ulsan Hyundai Mipo	43	(11)
2013–2017	Seongnam FC	75	(4)
2017	→ Sangju Sangmu (army)	2	(0)
2018–	Daegu FC	18	(0)
- * Club domestic league appearances and goals as of 6 December 2019

Jung Seon-ho (Korean: 정선호; born 25 March 1989) is a South Korean footballer who plays as midfielder for Daegu FC.

== Career ==
He joined Seongnam FC in 2013 after playing for Korea National League side Ulsan Hyundai Mipo.

== Honors and awards ==
=== Player ===
Daegu FC

- Korean FA Cup Winners (1) : 2018
