= Lee Tae-hee =

South Korean footballer

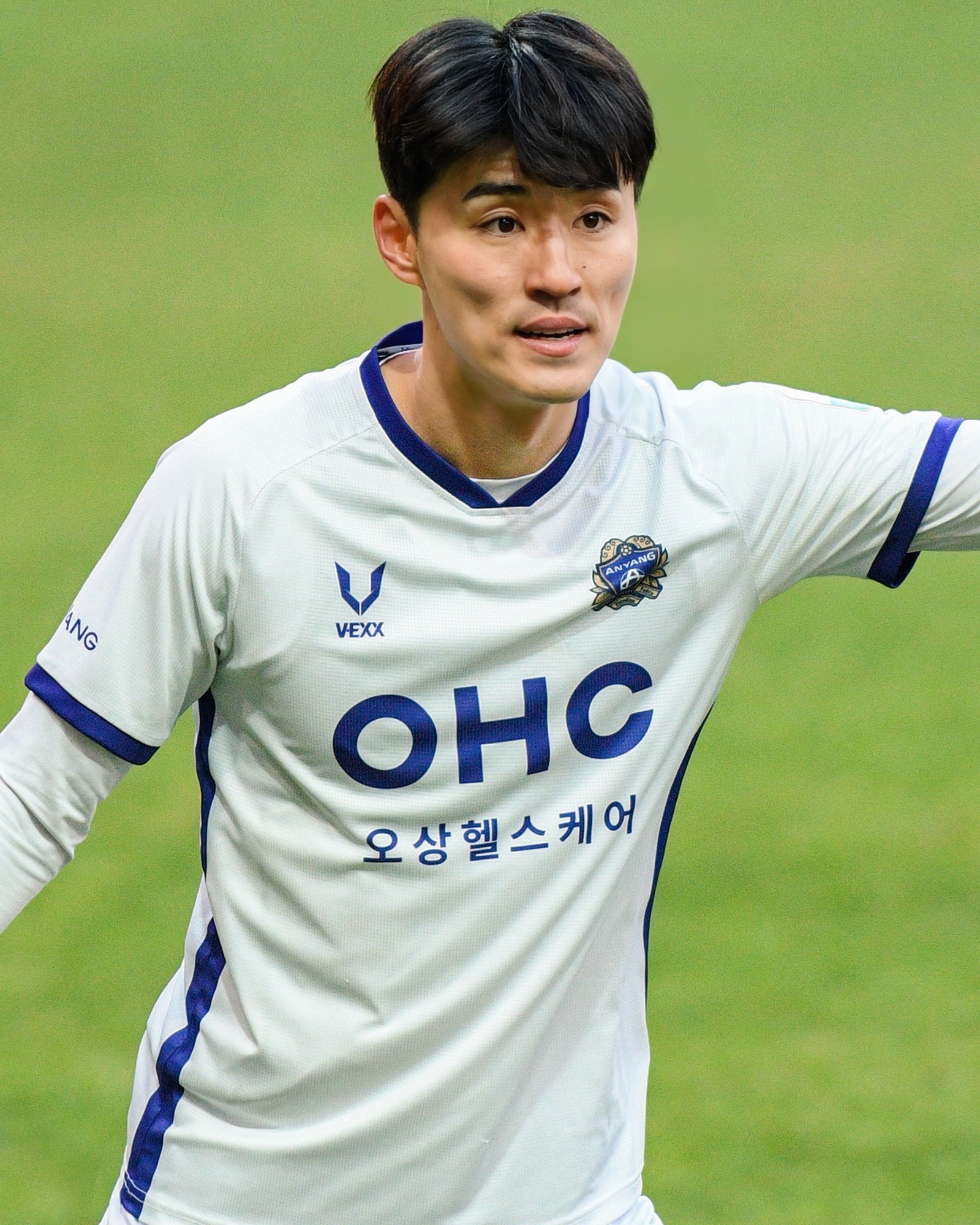
- Lee in 2024

Personal information
- Date of birth: 16 June 1992 (age 34)
- Place of birth: South Korea
- Height: 1.81 m (5 ft 11 1/2 in)
- Position: Defender

Team information
- Current team: Daegu FC
- Number: 32

Youth career
- 2011–2014: Soongsil University

Senior career*
Years	Team	Apps	(Gls)
2015–2021	Seongnam FC	132	(3)
2018–2019	→ Sangju Sangmu (army)	36	(3)
2022	Daegu FC	13	(0)
2023–	FC Anyang	102	(3)
- * Club domestic league appearances and goals as of 3 August 2026

Lee Tae-hee (Korean: 이태희; born 16 June 1992) is a South Korean footballer who plays as defender for FC Anyang.

== Career ==
Lee joined Seongnam FC in January 2016. He made his professional debut in the Champions League game against Bình Dương on 15 March.

== Career statistics ==
As of match played 22 November 2025

Appearances and goals by club, season and competition
Club	Season	League			Cup		Continental		Other		Total	
Club	Season	Division	Apps	Goals	Apps	Goals	Apps	Goals	Apps	Goals	Apps	Goals
Seongnam FC	2015	K League 1	13	1	2	0	0	0	—		15	1
Seongnam FC	2016	K League 1	28	1	1	0	—		0	0	29	1
Seongnam FC	2017	K League 1	28	0	2	0	—		1	0	31	0
Seongnam FC	2019	K League 1	10	0	—		—		—		10	0
Seongnam FC	2020	K League 1	26	0	2	0	—		—		28	0
Seongnam FC	2021	K League 1	27	1	0	0	—		—		27	1
Seongnam FC	Total		132	3	7	0	0	0	1	0	140	3
Sangju Sangmu (army)	2018	K League 1	9	1	1	0	—		—		10	1
Sangju Sangmu (army)	2019	K League 1	26	2	0	0	—		—		26	2
Sangju Sangmu (army)	Total		35	3	1	0	—		—		36	3
Daegu FC	2022	K League 1	13	0	1	0	0	0	—		14	0
FC Anyang	2023	K League 2	17	0	1	0	—		—		18	0
FC Anyang	2024	K League 2	36	2	1	0	—		—		37	2
FC Anyang	2025	K League 1	32	0	0	0	—		—		32	0
FC Anyang	Total		85	2	2	0	—		—		87	2
Career total			265	8	11	0	0	0	1	0	277	8
