= Yeon Je-un =

South Korean footballer (born 1994)

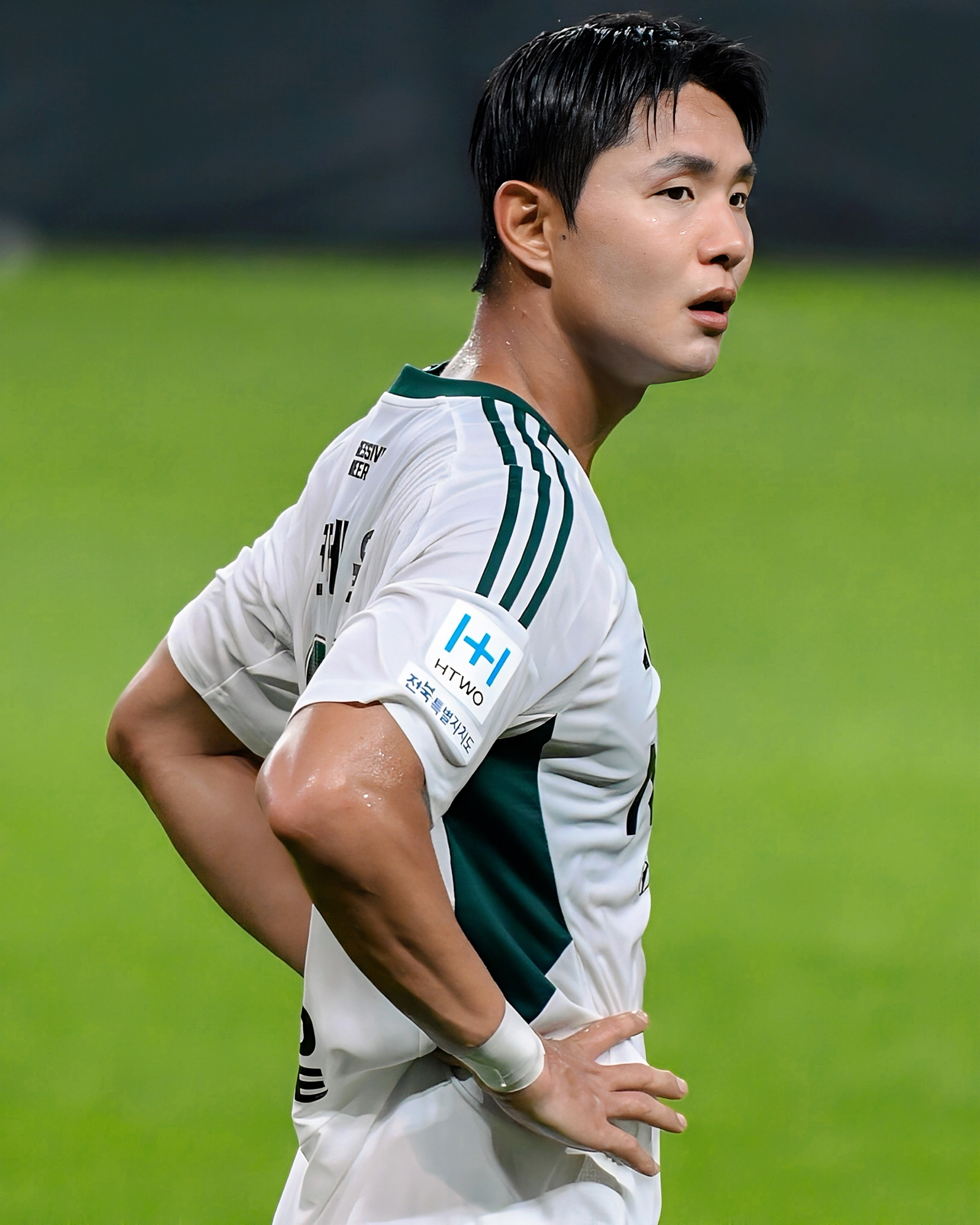
- Yeon in 2025

Personal information
- Date of birth: 28 August 1994 (age 32)
- Place of birth: South Korea
- Height: 1.83 m (6 ft 0 in)
- Position: Defender

Team information
- Current team: Jeonbuk Hyundai Motors
- Number: 3

Youth career
- 2013–2015: Sun Moon University

Senior career*
Years	Team	Apps	(Gls)
2016–2022	Seongnam	149	(3)
2021–2022	→ Gimcheon Sangmu (draft)	11	(1)
2023–2024	Jeju United	29	(2)
2024–	Jeonbuk Hyundai Motors	31	(0)
- * Club domestic league appearances and goals as of 3 August 2026

Yeon Je-un (Korean: 연제운; born 28 August 1994) is a South Korean footballer who plays as forward for Jeonbuk Hyundai Motors.

== Career ==
Jo Ju-young joined Seongnam FC in January 2016. He made his first appearance for Seongnam in the league game against Jeonbuk on 12 June. He scored his debut goal in the league game against Sangju on 10 July.
