= An Sang-hyun =

South Korean footballer (born 1986)

An Sang-Hyun
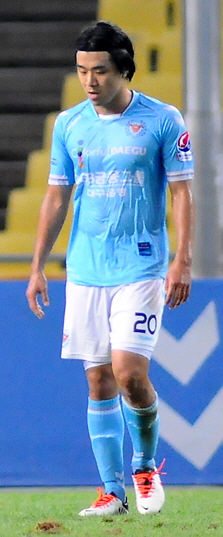

Personal information
- Full name: An Sang-Hyun
- Date of birth: 5 March 1986 (age 40)
- Place of birth: Paju, Gyeonggi, South Korea
- Height: 1.76 m (5 ft 9 in)
- Position: Midfielder

Team information
- Current team: Daejeon Citizen
- Number: 20

Senior career*
Years	Team	Apps	(Gls)
2002–2010	Anyang LG / FC Seoul	11	(1)
2009–2010	→ Gyeongnam FC (loan)	28	(0)
2011–2014	Daegu FC	110	(1)
2015	Daejeon Citizen	25	(0)
2016–2017	Seongnam FC	47	(1)
2018–	Daejeon Citizen	27	(1)

International career^{‡}
2003	South Korea U-17	9	(8)
2005	South Korea U-20	0	(0)
- * Club domestic league appearances and goals as of 12 January 2019 ‡ National team caps and goals as of 29 March 2008

- An Sang-hyun
- Hangul: 안상현
- Hanja: 安相炫
- RR: An Sanghyeon
- MR: An Sanghyŏn

An Sang-Hyun (Korean: 안상현; born 5 March 1986) is a South Korean footballer who currently plays as a midfielder for Daejeon Citizen.

== Club career ==
Born in Paju, An started his professional career in FC Seoul, then known as Anyang LG Cheetahs in 2002. In his seven-year spell with the club he only made 11 K League appearances, 10 of these coming in 2007, during Şenol Güneş' first season in charge of the club.

In July 2009, An agreed a loan move to Gyeongnam FC for the remainder of the 2009 season, and stayed on at Gyeongnam for 2010. An proved to be a regular starter for his new club, playing 35 games in his 18-month spell.

On 25 February 2011, An joined Daegu FC. An made his Daegu FC debut on 13 March against Gangwon FC in a 1–0 home victory.

== International career ==
An has represented South Korea at both Under-17 and Under-20 level. In 2003, he was part of the team that went to Finland to participate in the U-17 FIFA World Championship, and played in all three group games.

== Club career statistics ==
Club performance			League		Cup		League Cup		Continental		Total	
Season	Club	League	Apps	Goals	Apps	Goals	Apps	Goals	Apps	Goals	Apps	Goals
South Korea			League		KFA Cup		League Cup		Asia		Total	
2002	Anyang LG Cheetahs	K League 1	0	0	0	0	0	0	0	0	0	0
2003	Anyang LG Cheetahs	K League 1	0	0	0	0	-		-		0	0
2004	FC Seoul	K League 1	0	0	0	0	1	0	-		1	0
2005	FC Seoul	K League 1	1	0	0	0	0	0	-		1	0
2006	FC Seoul	K League 1	0	0	0	0	1	1	-		1	1
2007	FC Seoul	K League 1	10	1	0	0	1	0	-		11	1
2008	FC Seoul	K League 1	0	0	0	0	1	0	-		1	0
2009	FC Seoul	K League 1	0	0	0	0	0	0	0	0	0	0
2009	Gyeongnam FC	K League 1	9	0	0	0	0	0	-		9	0
2010	Gyeongnam FC	K League 1	19	0	2	0	5	0	-		26	0
2011	Daegu FC	K League 1	1	0					-		1	0
Career total			40	1	2	0	9	1	0	0	51	2

Sporting positions
Preceded by Yoon Won-il	Daejeon Citizen captain 2015	Succeeded by Kim Byung-suk
