= 2011 Busan I'Park season =

Busan I'Park
2011 season
- Chairman: Chung Mong-Gyu
- Manager: Ahn Ik-Soo
- K-League: 6th
- Korean FA Cup: Quarterfinal
- League Cup: Runners-up
- Top goalscorer: League: Han Sang-Woon (9); Yang Dong-Hyun (9); Lim Sang-Hyub (9); All: Han Sang-Woon (12)
- Highest home attendance: 29,267 vs Sangju (13 March)
- Lowest home attendance: 602 vs Chunnam (11 May)
- Average home league attendance: 5,982
Home colours	Away colours

The 2011 season was Busan I'Park's twenty-ninth season in the K-League in South Korea. Busan I'Park competed in K-League, League Cup and Korean FA Cup.

== Current squad ==
Note: Flags indicate national team as defined under FIFA eligibility rules; some limited exceptions apply. Players may hold more than one non-FIFA nationality.

No.	Pos.	Nation	Player
1	GK	KOR	Lee Beom-Young
3	DF	AUS	Iain Fyfe
5	DF	KOR	Lee Yo-Han
7	MF	KOR	Kim Geun-Cheol (captain)
8	MF	KOR	Lee Kil-Hoon
11	MF	KOR	Lim Sang-Hyub
13	MF	KOR	Kim Ki-Soo
14	MF	KOR	Yoo Ho-Joon
15	DF	KOR	Choo Sung-Ho
17	MF	KOR	Kim Ik-Hyun
18	FW	KOR	Yang Dong-Hyun
19	MF	KOR	Shin In-Seob
20	FW	KOR	Han Sang-Woon
21	GK	KOR	Jeon Sang-Wook
22	FW	KOR	Han Ji-Ho
23	MF	KOR	Park Jong-Woo
24	MF	KOR	Kim Tae-Jun
25	FW	KOR	Choi Jin-Ho

No.	Pos.	Nation	Player
26	DF	KOR	Lee Won-Kyu
27	DF	KOR	Kim Chang-Soo
28	MF	KOR	Lee Jong-Won
30	MF	KOR	Park Hee-Do (vice-captain)
31	GK	KOR	Kim Ji-Hwan
32	FW	KOR	Shin Wan-Hui
33	DF	KOR	Park Tae-Min
34	MF	KOR	Yoo Ji-Hoon
35	FW	BRA	Fagner (on loan from Salgueiro)
37	DF	BRA	Éder Baiano (on loan from Rio Preto)
38	DF	KOR	Lee Se-In
39	DF	KOR	Hwang Jae-Hun
40	DF	KOR	Lee Dong-Won
41	DF	KOR	Lee Sung-Woon
44	FW	KOR	Yoon Dong-Min
47	MF	KOR	Jeong Min-Hyeong
49	MF	KOR	Kim Han-Yoon
77	MF	KOR	Choi Kwang-Hee

== Match results ==
=== K-League ===
Date Round	Home	Score	Away	Location

6 March 1	Jeju United	2–1	Busan I'Park	Seogwipo, Jeju
15:00 UTC+9	Santos 27'; Bae Ki-Jong 61'; Hong Jung-Ho (red card)	Report	Park Hee-Do 12'	Stadium: Jeju World Cup Stadium; Attendance: 4,172; Referee: Lee Jong-Guk

13 March 2	Busan I'Park	3–3	Sangju Sangmu Phoenix	Yeonje-gu, Busan
15:00 UTC+9	Han Sang-Woon 5'; Fyfe 82'; Lee Won-Kyu 90+4'	Report	Cho Yong-Tae 28'; Choi Hyo-Jin 37'; Kim Jung-Woo 86'	Stadium: Busan Asiad Stadium; Attendance: 29,267; Referee: Hong Jin-Ho

20 March 3	Jeonbuk Hyundai Motors	5–2	Busan I'Park	Jeonju, Jeonbuk
15:00 UTC+9	Lee Dong-Gook 32', 64'; Kim Ji-Woong 41'; Lee Seung-Hyun 73'; Jeong Shung-Hoon 79'	Report	Yang Dong-Hyun 18'; Lim Sang-Hyub 30' (yellow card) 31' (yellow-red card) 60'	Stadium: Jeonju World Cup Stadium; Attendance: 9,747; Referee: Choi Myung-Yong

3 April 4	Seongnam Ilhwa Chunma	2–0	Busan I'Park	Seongnam, Gyeonggi
17:00 UTC+9	Cho Dong-Geon 53'; Hong Cheol 55'	Report		Stadium: Tancheon Sports Complex; Attendance: 6,438; Referee: Lee Sang-Yong

10 April 5	Busan I'Park	1 –1	FC Seoul	Yeonje-gu, Busan
15:00 UTC+9	Yang Dong-Hyun 73'	Report	Ko Yo-Han 36'	Stadium: Busan Asiad Stadium; Attendance: 5,208; Referee: Ko Keum-Bok

16 April 6	Busan I'Park	2–2	Daegu	Yeonje-gu, Busan
15:00 UTC+9	Han Sang-Woon 25'; Yang Dong-Hyun 81' (pen.)	Report	Song Je-Heon 22'; Song Chang-Ho 75'	Stadium: Busan Asiad Stadium; Attendance: 3,111; Referee: Moon Jin-Hee

24 April 7	Daejeon Citizen	1–3	Busan I'Park	Yuseong-gu, Daejeon
15:00 UTC+9	Han Jae-Woong 25'	Report	Kim Eung-Jin 13'; Kim Han-Yoon 52'; Han Sang-Woon 70'	Stadium: Daejeon World Cup Stadium; Attendance: 14,895; Referee: Lim Won-Taek

30 April 8	Busan I'Park	3–0	Chunnam Dragons	Yeonje-gu, Busan
19:00 UTC+9	Lim Sang-Hyub 33'; Lee Jung-Ho 37'; Han Sang-Woon 79'	Report		Stadium: Busan Asiad Stadium; Attendance: 2,515; Referee: Ko Hyung-Jin

8 May 9	Busan I'Park	2–1	Pohang Steelers	Yeonje-gu, Busan
17:00 UTC+9	Kim Chang-Soo 31'; Han Sang-Woon 44'	Report	Mota 45+1'	Stadium: Busan Asiad Stadium; Attendance: 10,272; Referee: Ko Keum-Bok

15 May 10	Incheon United	0–0	Busan I'Park	Seo-gu, Incheon
15:00 UTC+9		Report		Stadium: Incheon Munhak Stadium; Attendance: 6,208; Referee: Lee Dong-Jun

21 May 11	Suwon Samsung Bluewings	1–2	Busan I'Park	Suwon, Gyeonggi
19:30 UTC+9	Kim Han-Yoon 64' (o.g.); Hwang Jae-Won (yellow card) 53' (yellow-red card) 76'; Hong Soon-Hak (yellow card) 71' (yellow-red card) 86'	Report	Lee Jung-Ho 13'; Yang Dong-Hyun 87' (pen.)	Stadium: Suwon World Cup Stadium; Attendance: 18,714; Referee: Choi Myung-Yong

28 May 12	Busan I'Park	1–1	Gwangju	Yeonje-gu, Busan
19:00 UTC+9	Lim Sang-Hyub 65'; Hong Seong-Yo (red card) 88'	Report	João Paulo 90+4'	Stadium: Busan Asiad Stadium; Attendance: 6,564; Referee: Ahn Yong-Hee

11 June 13	Gangwon	1–0	Busan I'Park	Gangneung, Gangwon
19:00 UTC+9	Lee Jung-Ho 41' (o.g.)	Report	Kim Eung-Jin (yellow card) 74' (yellow-red card) 90'	Stadium: Gangneung Stadium; Attendance: 5,373; Referee: Kim Sung-Ho

18 June 14	Gyeongnam	3–2	Busan I'Park	Changwon, Gyeongnam
19:00 UTC+9	Lee Kyung-Ryul 69'; Lee Hun 84'; Kim Tae-Wook 88'	Report	Yang Dong-Hyun 62'; Han Sang-Woon 74'	Stadium: Changwon Football Center; Attendance: 8,137; Referee: Ko Keum-Bok

25 June 15	Busan I'Park	2–0	Ulsan Hyundai	Yeonje-gu, Busan
19:00 UTC+9	Lim Sang-Hyub 52'; Yang Dong-Hyun 60'	Report		Stadium: Busan Asiad Stadium; Attendance: 2,336; Referee: Kim Jong-Hyuk

2 July 16	Busan I'Park	1–0	Seongnam Ilhwa Chunma	Yeonje-gu, Busan
19:00 UTC+9	Han Sang-Woon 17'	Report		Stadium: Busan Asiad Stadium; Attendance: 6,019; Referee: Kim Dong-Jin

9 July 17	Daegu	2–3	Busan I'Park	Buk-gu, Daegu
19:00 UTC+9	Yoo Kyoung-Youl 35'; Hwang Il-Su 68'	Report	Yoo Kyoung-Youl 60' (o.g.); Lim Sang-Hyub 85'; Han Sang-Woon 90+2'	Stadium: Daegu Civil Stadium; Attendance: 1,027; Referee: Kim Sang-Woo

16 July 18	Sangju Sangmu Phoenix	1–2	Busan I'Park	Sangju, Gyeongbuk
19:00 UTC+9	Kim Cheol-Ho 34'	Report	Han Ji-Ho 38'; Park Tae-Min 74'	Stadium: Sangju Stadium; Attendance: 8,352; Referee: Kim Sung-Ho

23 July 19	Busan I'Park	4–3	Suwon Samsung Bluewings	Yeonje-gu, Busan
19:00 UTC+9	Lim Sang-Hyub 45+2'; Yang Dong-Hyun 69'; Fagner 76', 85'	Report	Ristić 22' (pen.); Lee Sang-ho 80'; Ha Tae-Gyun 83'	Stadium: Busan Asiad Stadium; Attendance: 8,143; Referee: Ryu Hee-Sun

6 August 20	Pohang Steelers	3–2	Busan I'Park	Pohang, Gyeongbuk
19:00 UTC+9	Lee Dong-Won 15' (o.g.); Ko Mu-Yeol 18'; Asamoah 83'	Report	Lim Sang-Hyub 38'; Fagner 88' (pen.)	Stadium: Steelyard Stadium; Attendance: 16,355; Referee: Ko Keum-Bok

13 August 21	Busan I'Park	1–0	Incheon United	Yeonje-gu, Busan
19:00 UTC+9	Fagner 25' (pen.) (yellow card) 21' (yellow-red card) 81'	Report		Stadium: Busan Asiad Stadium; Attendance: 5,613; Referee: Choi Myung-Yong

21 August 22	Chunnam Dragons	1–1	Busan I'Park	Gwangyang, Jeonnam
19:00 UTC+9	Kim Myung-Joong 35'	Report	Park Jong-Woo 22'	Stadium: Gwangyang Stadium; Attendance: 7,651; Referee: Moon JIn-Hee

27 August 23	Busan I'Park	2–3	Jeonbuk Hyundai Motors	Yeonje-gu, Busan
19:00 UTC+9	Han Sang-Woon 8'; Fagner 46'	Report	Huang Bowen 39'; Lim You-Hwan 55'; Jeong Shung-Hoon 57'	Stadium: Busan Asiad Stadium; Attendance: 6,695; Referee: Ryu Hee-Sun

11 September 24	Busan I'Park	1–0	Daejeon Citizen	Yeonje-gu, Busan
19:00 UTC+9	Fagner 29'	Report	Kang In-Jun (red card) 22'; Park Min-Keun (yellow card) 19' (yellow-red card) 69'	Stadium: Busan Asiad Stadium; Attendance: 3,124; Referee: Choi Kwang-Bo

18 September 25	FC Seoul	2–1	Busan I'Park	Mapo-gu, Seoul
17:00 UTC+9	Kim Dong-Jin 63'; Kang Jung-Hun 89'	Report	Éder Baiano 41'	Stadium: Seoul World Cup Stadium; Attendance: 33,663; Referee: Lee Sang-Yong

25 September 26	Gwangju	2–2	Busan I'Park	Seo-gu, Gwangju
15:00 UTC+9	Lee Seung-Ki 60'; Yoo Jong-Hyun 90'	Report	Yoon Dong-Min 75'; Yang Dong-Hyun 80'	Stadium: Gwangju World Cup Stadium; Attendance: 3,156; Referee: Moon Jin-Hee

2 October 27	Busan I'Park	0–1	Gyeongnam	Seo-gu, Busan
15:00 UTC+9		Report	Roni 16'; Kang Seung-Jo (yellow card) 50' (yellow-red card) 87'	Stadium: Busan Gudeok Stadium; Attendance: 8,691; Referee: Choi Myung-Yong

16 October 28	Busan I'Park	3–1	Jeju United	Yeonje-gu, Busan
15:00 UTC+9	Park Jong-Woo 33'; Lim Sang-Hyub 42', 59'	Report	Yang Joon-A 84' (yellow card) 44' (yellow-red card) 88'	Stadium: Busan Asiad Stadium; Attendance: 4,835; Referee: Ko Keum-Bok

22 October 29	Ulsan Hyundai	1–0	Busan I'Park	Nam-gu, Ulsan
17:00 UTC+9	Go Seul-Ki 70'	Report		Stadium: Munsu Cup Stadium; Attendance: 11,257; Referee: Lee Sang-Yong

30 October 30	Busan I'Park	2–0	Gangwon	Yeonje-gu, Busan
15:00 UTC+9	Han Ji-Ho 34'; Yang Dong-Hyun 90+1' (pen.)	Report		Stadium: Busan Asiad Stadium; Attendance: 6,237; Referee: Ko Keum-Bok

==== League table ====
Pos	Team	Pld	W	D	L	GF	GA	GD	Pts	Qualification
3	FC Seoul	30	16	7	7	56	38	+18	55	Qualification for the K League playoffs first round
4	Suwon Samsung Bluewings	30	17	4	9	51	33	+18	55	Qualification for the K League playoffs first round
5	Busan IPark	30	13	7	10	49	43	+6	46	Qualification for the K League playoffs first round
6	Ulsan Hyundai	30	13	7	10	33	29	+4	46	Qualification for the K League playoffs first round
7	Jeonnam Dragons	30	11	10	9	33	29	+4	43	

Source: K League
Rules for classification: 1) Points; 2) Goal difference; 3) Goals scored

Pos	Team	Qualification
1	Jeonbuk Hyundai Motors (C)	Qualification for the Champions League group stage
2	Ulsan Hyundai	Qualification for the Champions League group stage
3	Pohang Steelers	Qualification for the Champions League playoff round
4	Suwon Samsung Bluewings	
5	FC Seoul	
6	Busan IPark	

Source: RSSSF
(C) Champions

==== Results summary ====
Overall								Home						Away					
Pld	W	D	L	GF	GA	GD	Pts	W	D	L	GF	GA	GD	W	D	L	GF	GA	GD
30	13	7	10	49	43	+6	46	9	4	2	28	16	+12	4	3	8	21	27	−6

==== Results by round ====
Round	1	2	3	4	5	6	7	8	9	10	11	12	13	14	15	16	17	18	19	20	21	22	23	24	25	26	27	28	29	30
Ground	A	H	A	A	H	H	A	H	H	A	A	H	A	A	H	H	A	A	H	A	H	A	H	H	A	A	H	H	A	H
Result	L	D	L	L	D	D	W	W	W	D	W	D	L	L	W	W	W	W	W	L	W	D	L	W	L	D	L	W	L	W
Position	11	11	14	15	15	15	13	12	9	9	6	7	8	12	8	6	5	5	3	6	4	4	6	6	6	6	6	5	6	5

Updated to match(es) played on 30 October 2011. Source: League Fixtures and Results
A = Away; H = Home; W = Win; D = Draw; L = Loss

=== K-League Championship ===
20 November First Round	Suwon Samsung Bluewings	1–0	Busan I'Park	Suwon, Gyeonggi
15:00 UTC+9	Ha Tae-Gyun 45+2'	Report		Stadium: Suwon World Cup Stadium; Attendance: 23,903; Referee: Choi Myung-Yong

=== Korean FA Cup ===
18 May Round of 32	Cheonan City	1–2	Busan I'Park	Cheonan, Chungnam
19:00 UTC+9	Hwang Ho-Ryung 63'		Kim Bon-Kwang 36' (o.g.); Yoon Dong-Min 66'	Stadium: Cheonan Football Center; Attendance: 1,550; Referee: Choi Dae-Woo

15 June Round of 16	Jeonbuk Hyundai Motors	1–2	Busan I'Park	Jeonju, Jeonbuk
19:00 UTC+9	Cho Sung-Hwan 4' (yellow card) 31' (yellow-red card) 70'		Han Sang-Woon 55', 64'	Stadium: Jeonju World Cup Stadium; Attendance: 4,328; Referee: Ko Hyung-Jin

27 July Quarterfinal	Seongnam Ilhwa Chunma	2–1	Busan I'Park	Seongnam, Gyeonggi
19:00 UTC+9	Héverton 5'; Radončić 90'		Han Sang-Woon 13' (pen.)	Stadium: Tancheon Sports Complex; Attendance: 928; Referee: Kim Sung-Ho

=== League Cup ===
16 March Group round	Ulsan Hyundai	2–1	Busan I'Park	Nam-gu, Ulsan
19:00 UTC+9	Kim Shin-Wook 19', 46'	Report	Kang Min-Soo 63' (o.g.)	Stadium: Munsu Cup Stadium; Attendance: 4,856; Referee: Ahn Yong-Hee

6 April Group round	Busan I'Park	1–0	Gwangju	Yeonje-gu, Busan
19:00 UTC+9	Han Ji-Ho 37'	Report		Stadium: Busan Asiad Stadium; Attendance: 1,502; Referee: Kim Sang-Woo

20 April Group round	Busan I'Park	2–1	Sangju Sangmu Phoenix	Yeonje-gu, Busan
19:00 UTC+9	Han Ji-Ho 30'; Kim Han-Yoon 54'	Report	Jung Kyung-ho (yellow card) 49' (yellow-red card) 83'; Kim Chi-Woo 90+2'	Stadium: Busan Asiad Stadium; Attendance: 1,038; Referee: Woo Sang-Il

5 May Group round	Gangwon	0–2	Busan I'Park	Gangneung, Gangwon
15:00 UTC+9		Report	Choo Sung-Ho 28'; Choi Jin-Ho 66'	Stadium: Gangneung Stadium; Attendance: 13,724; Referee: Kim Dong-Jin

11 May Group round	Busan I'Park	1–0	Chunnam Dragons	Yeonje-gu, Busan
15:00 UTC+9	Lee Jong-Won 32'	Report		Stadium: Busan Asiad Stadium; Attendance: 602; Referee: Yoo Seon-Ho

29 June Quarterfinal	Pohang Steelers	1–2	Busan I'Park	Pohang, Gyeongbuk
19:30 UTC+9	Jeong Seok-Min 68'	Report	Yoon Dong-Min 10'; Park Hee-Do 19'	Stadium: Steelyard Stadium; Attendance: 6,288; Referee: Woo Sang-Il

6 July Semifinal	Busan I'Park	2–1	Suwon Samsung Bluewings	Yeonje-gu, Busan
20:00 UTC+9	Lim Sang-Hyub 43'; Kim Han-Yoon 90'	Report	Yang Joon-A 7'	Stadium: Busan Asiad Stadium; Attendance: 1,878; Referee: Yoo Seon-Ho

13 July Final	Ulsan Hyundai	3–2	Busan I'Park	Nam-gu, Ulsan
19:00 UTC+9	Ko Chang-Hyun 38'; Seol Ki-Hyeon 45+1'; Kang Jin-Wook 58'	Report	Yang Dong-Hyun 71', 77'	Stadium: Munsu Cup Stadium; Attendance: 21,853; Referee: Lee Min-Hu

== Squad statistics ==
=== Appearances and goals ===
Statistics accurate as of match played 20 November 2011

Numbers in parentheses denote appearances as substitute.

No.	Nat.	Pos.	Name	League		FA Cup		League Cup		Total	
No.	Nat.	Pos.	Name	Apps	Goals	Apps	Goals	Apps	Goals	Apps	Goals
1	KOR	GK	Lee Beom-Young	14	0	2	0	4	0	20 (0)	0
3	AUS	DF	Iain Fyfe	8	1	2	0	6 (1)	0	16 (1)	1
5	KOR	DF	Lee Yo-Han	12 (3)	0	1	0	3	0	16 (3)	0
7	KOR	MF	Kim Geun-Cheol	3	0	0	0	3	0	6 (0)	0
8	KOR	MF	Lee Kil-Hoon	1	0	0	0	0	0	1 (0)	0
11	KOR	MF	Lim Sang-Hyub	27 (1)	9	2	0	5 (1)	1	34 (2)	10
13	KOR	MF	Kim Ki-Soo	0	0	0	0	0	0	0	0
14	KOR	MF	Yoo Ho-Joon	8 (5)	0	1 (1)	0	5	0	14 (6)	0
15	KOR	DF	Choo Sung-Ho	5 (1)	0	2	0	5	1	12 (1)	1
17	KOR	MF	Kim Ik-Hyun	0 (3)	0	1	0	3	0	4 (3)	0
18	KOR	FW	Yang Dong-Hyun	6 (19)	9	1 (2)	0	3 (3)	2	10 (24)	11
19	KOR	MF	Shin In-Seob	0	0	0	0	0	0	0	0
20	KOR	FW	Han Sang-Woon	23 (5)	9	2	3	3 (1)	0	28 (6)	12
21	KOR	GK	Jeon Sang-Wook	17	0	1	0	4	0	22 (0)	0
22	KOR	FW	Han Ji-Ho	19 (8)	2	1 (1)	0	3 (2)	2	23 (11)	4
23	KOR	MF	Park Jong-Woo	25	2	2	0	5	0	32 (0)	2
24	KOR	MF	Kim Tae-Jun	0	0	0	0	1 (1)	0	1 (1)	0
25	KOR	FW	Choi Jin-Ho	1 (7)	0	0 (1)	0	2 (2)	1	3 (10)	1
26	KOR	DF	Lee Won-Kyu	3	1	0	0	0	0	3 (0)	1
27	KOR	DF	Kim Chang-Soo	29	1	3	0	6	0	38 (0)	1
28	KOR	MF	Lee Jong-Won	0 (1)	0	1	0	3	1	4 (1)	1
30	KOR	MF	Park Hee-Do	9 (1)	1	0	0	4	1	13 (1)	2
31	KOR	GK	Kim Ji-Hwan	0	0	0	0	0	0	0	0
32	KOR	FW	Shin Wan-Hui	0	0	0 (1)	0	0	0	0 (1)	0
33	KOR	DF	Park Tae-Min	17 (1)	1	2	0	4 (1)	0	23 (2)	1
34	KOR	MF	Yoo Ji-Hoon	5	0	0	0	0	0	5 (0)	0
35	BRA	FW	Fagner	10 (1)	6	1	0	0	0	11 (1)	6
37	BRA	DF	Éder Baiano	12	1	0	0	0	0	12 (0)	1
38	KOR	DF	Lee Se-In	0	0	0	0	0	0	0	0
39	KOR	DF	Hwang Jae-Hun	11	0	0	0	0	0	11 (0)	0
40	KOR	DF	Lee Dong-Won	5 (1)	0	1	0	0	0	6 (1)	0
41	KOR	DF	Lee Sung-Woon	4 (2)	0	0	0	0	0	4 (2)	0
44	KOR	FW	Yoon Dong-Min	1 (12)	1	1 (1)	1	3 (2)	1	5 (15)	3
47	KOR	MF	Jeong Min-Hyeong	1 (4)	0	0	0	1	0	2 (4)	0
49	KOR	MF	Kim Han-Yoon	22	1	2 (1)	0	3 (2)	2	27 (3)	3
77	KOR	MF	Choi Kwang-Hee	5 (5)	0	0	0	1 (2)	0	6 (7)	0
2	KOR	DF	Hong Seong-Yo (out)	1 (3)	0	2	0	3	0	6 (3)	0
4	KOR	DF	Lee Jung-Ho (out)	11 (1)	2	1 (1)	0	1 (1)	0	13 (3)	2
6	NED	DF	Bas van den Brink (out)	0 (2)	0	0	0	1	0	1 (2)	0
9	BRA	FW	Tássio (out)	0	0	0	0	0	0	0	0
10	BRA	MF	Felipe Azevedo (out)	5	0	0	0	0	0	5 (0)	0
29	KOR	DF	Kim Eung-Jin (out)	12	1	1	0	3 (2)	0	16 (2)	1
36	KOR	MF	Noh Yong-Hun (out)	0	0	0	0	0 (1)	0	0 (1)	0
61	KOR	DF	Lee Sang-Hong (out)	9	0	0	0	0 (2)	0	9 (2)	0

=== Top scorers ===
Rank	Nation	Number	Name	K-League	KFA Cup	League Cup	Total
1	(South Korea)	20	Han Sang-Woon	9	3	0	12
2	(South Korea)	18	Yang Dong-Hyun	9	0	2	11
3	(South Korea)	11	Lim Sang-Hyub	9	0	1	10
4	(Brazil)	35	Fagner	6	0	0	6
5	(South Korea)	22	Han Ji-Ho	2	0	2	4
6	(South Korea)	44	Yoon Dong-Min	1	1	1	3
=	(South Korea)	49	Kim Han-Yoon	1	0	2	3
7	(South Korea)	4	Lee Jung-Ho	2	0	0	2
=	(South Korea)	23	Park Jong-Woo	2	0	0	2
=	(South Korea)	30	Park Hee-Do	1	0	1	2
8	(Australia)	3	Iain Fyfe	1	0	0	1
=	(South Korea)	26	Lee Won-Kyu	1	0	0	1
=	(South Korea)	27	Kim Chang-Soo	1	0	0	1
=	(South Korea)	29	Kim Eung-Jin	1	0	0	1
=	(South Korea)	33	Park Tae-Min	1	0	0	1
=	(Brazil)	37	Éder Baiano	1	0	0	1
=	(South Korea)	15	Choo Sung-Ho	0	0	1	1
=	(South Korea)	25	Choi Jin-Ho	0	0	1	1
=	(South Korea)	28	Lee Jong-Won	0	0	1	1
/	/	/	Own Goals	1	1	1	3
/	/	/	TOTALS	49	5	13	67

=== Top assistors ===
Rank	Nation	Number	Name	K-League	KFA Cup	League Cup	Total
1	(South Korea)	20	Han Sang-Woon	7	0	1	8
2	(South Korea)	27	Kim Chang-Soo	4	0	1	5
3	(South Korea)	22	Han Ji-Ho	4	0	0	4
4	(South Korea)	18	Yang Dong-Hyun	3	0	0	3
=	(South Korea)	11	Lim Sang-Hyub	1	0	2	3
=	(South Korea)	23	Park Jong-Woo	1	0	2	3
5	(South Korea)	4	Lee Jung-Ho	1	0	0	1
=	(South Korea)	5	Lee Yo-Han	1	0	0	1
=	(Brazil)	10	Felipe Azevedo	1	0	0	1
=	(South Korea)	30	Park Hee-Do	1	0	0	1
=	(South Korea)	33	Park Tae-Min	1	0	0	1
=	(South Korea)	49	Kim Han-Yoon	1	0	0	1
=	(South Korea)	28	Lee Jong-Won	0	0	1	1
/	/	/	TOTALS	26	0	7	33

=== Discipline ===
Position	Nation	Number	Name	K-League		KFA Cup		League Cup		Total	
Position	Nation	Number	Name	Booked	Sent off (straight red)	Booked	Sent off (straight red)	Booked	Sent off (straight red)	Booked	Sent off (straight red)
GK	(South Korea)	1	Lee Beom-Young	1	0	0	0	0	0	1	0
DF	(South Korea)	2	Hong Seong-Yo	1	0	0	0	0	0	1	0
DF	(South Korea)	4	Lee Jung-Ho	2	0	1	0	1	0	4	0
DF	(South Korea)	5	Lee Yo-Han	2	0	1	0	1	0	4	0
MF	(South Korea)	7	Kim Geun-Cheol	1	0	0	0	1	0	2	0
MF	(South Korea)	11	Lim Sang-Hyub	8	1	1	0	1	0	10	1
MF	(South Korea)	14	Yoo Ho-Joon	0	0	0	0	1	0	1	0
DF	(South Korea)	15	Choo Sung-Ho	2	0	0	0	0	0	2	0
MF	(South Korea)	17	Kim Ik-Hyun	2	0	0	0	1	0	3	0
FW	(South Korea)	18	Yang Dong-Hyun	5	0	0	0	0	0	5	0
FW	(South Korea)	20	Han Sang-Woon	1	0	0	0	0	0	1	0
GK	(South Korea)	21	Jeon Sang-Wook	5	0	0	0	0	0	5	0
FW	(South Korea)	22	Han Ji-Ho	3	0	0	0	1	0	4	0
MF	(South Korea)	23	Park Jong-Woo	6	0	0	0	1	0	7	0
FW	(South Korea)	25	Choi Jin-Ho	0	0	0	0	1	0	1	0
DF	(South Korea)	27	Kim Chang-Soo	3	0	0	0	2	0	5	0
MF	(South Korea)	28	Lee Jong-Won	0	0	1	0	1	0	2	0
DF	(South Korea)	29	Kim Eung-Jin	3	1	1	0	0	0	4	1
MF	(South Korea)	30	Park Hee-Do	2	0	0	0	1	0	3	0
DF	(South Korea)	33	Park Tae-Min	1	0	1	0	1	0	3	0
MF	(South Korea)	34	Yoo Ji-Hoon	2	0	0	0	0	0	2	0
FW	(Brazil)	35	Fagner	5	1	1	0	0	0	6	1
MF	(South Korea)	36	Noh Yong-Hun	0	0	0	0	1	0	1	0
DF	(Brazil)	37	Éder Baiano	1	0	0	0	0	0	1	0
DF	(South Korea)	39	Hwang Jae-Hun	2	0	0	0	0	0	2	0
DF	(South Korea)	40	Lee Dong-Won	2	0	0	0	0	0	2	0
DF	(South Korea)	41	Lee Sung-Woon	2	0	0	0	0	0	2	0
MF	(South Korea)	49	Kim Han-Yoon	10	0	0	0	1	0	11	0
DF	(South Korea)	61	Lee Sang-Hong	3	0	0	0	0	0	3	0
/	/	/	TOTALS	75	2	7	0	16	0	98	2

== Transfer ==
=== In ===
- 7 July 2011 – (South Korea) Yoo Ji-Hoon – Gyeongnam FC
- 8 July 2011 – (South Korea) Lee Se-In – Changchun Yatai F.C.
- 12 July 2011 – (South Korea) Hwang Jae-Hun – Daejeon Citizen
- 14 July 2011 – (South Korea) Lee Dong-Won – Ulsan Hyundai FC
- 20 July 2011 – (Brazil) Éder Baiano – Rio Preto (loan)
- 20 July 2011 – (Brazil) Fagner – Salgueiro (loan)
- 28 July 2011 – (South Korea) Lee Sung-Woon – Daejeon KHNP

=== Out ===
- 14 June 2011 – (Netherlands) Bas van den Brink – Free Agent
- 14 June 2011 – (Brazil) Tássio – Free Agent
- 14 June 2011 – (Brazil) Felipe Azevedo – Free Agent
- 7 July 2011 – (South Korea) Lee Sang-Hong – Released (under arrest)
- 7 July 2011 – (South Korea) Hong Seong-Yo – Released (under indictment)
- 7 July 2011 – (South Korea) Kim Eung-Jin – Released (under indictment)
- 7 July 2011 – (South Korea) Lee Jung-Ho – Released (under indictment)
- 12 July 2011 – (South Korea) Noh Yong-Hun – Daejeon Citizen
- 14 July 2011 – (South Korea) Park Woo-Hyun – Gangwon FC
