= 2010 Busan I'Park season =

Busan I'Park FC
2010 season
- Chairman: Ahn Byung-Mo
- Manager: Hwang Sun-Hong
- K-League: 8th
- Korean FA Cup: Runner-up
- League Cup: Quarterfinal
- Top goalscorer: League: Jeong Shung-Hoon (7); All: Han Sang-Woon (11); Jeong Shung-Hoon (11)
- Average home league attendance: 4,393
Home colours	Away colours

The 2010 season was Busan I'Park FC's 28th season in the K-League in South Korea. Busan I'Park FC is competing in K-League, League Cup and Korean FA Cup.

== Current squad ==
Note: Flags indicate national team as defined under FIFA eligibility rules; some limited exceptions apply. Players may hold more than one non-FIFA nationality.

No.	Pos.	Nation	Player
1	GK	KOR	Choi Hyun
2	DF	KOR	Park Jin-Seop
3	DF	KOR	Hong Seong-Yo
4	DF	KOR	Lee Jung-Ho
5	DF	KOR	Kim Dae-Gun
6	MF	KOR	Seo Dong-Won (captain)
7	MF	KOR	Kim Geun-Cheol
8	MF	KOR	Kim Hyo-Il
9	FW	KOR	Jeong Shung-Hoon
10	FW	BRA	Felipe Azevedo
13	MF	KOR	Kim Ki-Soo
14	MF	KOR	Yoo Ho-Joon
15	DF	KOR	Choo Sung-Ho
17	MF	KOR	Kim Ik-Hyun
18	FW	KOR	Yang Dong-Hyun
20	FW	KOR	Han Sang-Woon
21	GK	KOR	Jeon Sang-Wook
22	FW	KOR	Han Ji-Ho

No.	Pos.	Nation	Player
23	MF	KOR	Park Jong-Woo
24	MF	KOR	Kim Sang-Rok
25	DF	KOR	Kim Jong-Hoon
26	MF	KOR	Noh Yong-Hun
27	DF	KOR	Kim Chang-Soo
28	MF	KOR	Yoon Ju-Il
29	DF	KOR	Kim Eung-Jin
30	MF	KOR	Park Hee-Do
31	GK	KOR	Lee Beom-Young
32	MF	KOR	Lee Seung-Hyun
33	DF	KOR	Park Woo-Hyun
34	DF	KOR	Myung Wang-Seong
35	MF	KOR	Jung Min-Hyung
77	MF	KOR	Choi Kwang-Hee
87	DF	KOR	Oh Jung-Soo
99	MF	KOR	Ha Sung-Min
TBA	MF	KOR	Lee Kil-Hoon

== K-League ==
Date	Opponents	H / A	Result F – A	Scorers	Attendance	League position
27 February	Jeju United FC	H	0–1		3,103	10th
6 March	Suwon Samsung Bluewings	A	3–4	Jeong Shung-Hoon 5', Hong Seong-Yo 61', Yoo Ho-Joon 83'	23,435	12th
13 March	Ulsan Hyundai FC	A	2–0	Park Hee-Do 0:50', Jeong Shung-Hoon 63'	8,150	11th
21 March	Gwangju Sangmu FC	H	2–0	Kim Eung-Jin 68', Kim Chang-Soo 77'	3,405	7th
27 March	Seongnam Ilhwa Chunma	A	1–1	Rômulo 87'	1,256	8th
4 April	Daegu FC	H	0–2		3,563	8th
11 April	Incheon United FC	H	2–1	Yoo Ho-Joon 22', Own goal 77'	2,803	7th
18 April	Gangwon FC	A	0–0		11,126	7th
2 May	FC Seoul	H	3–0	Jeong Shung-Hoon 16', Park Hee-Do 19', Han Sang-Woon 72'	8,181	7th
5 May	Gyeongnam FC	A	1–0	Han Sang-Woon 71'	16,245	6th
9 May	Daejeon Citizen	H	1–1	Yoo Ho-Joon 38'	3,280	7th
17 July	Pohang Steelers	H	4–2	Kim Chang-Soo 14', Felipe Azevedo 24', 42', Kim Geun-Cheol 50'	5,830	7th
25 July	Chunnam Dragons	A	2–2	Yoo Ho-Joon 47', Park Hee-Do 63'	9,595	7th
31 July	Jeonbuk Hyundai Motors	A	1–2	Choo Sung-Ho 38'	14,291	7th
8 August	Gyeongnam FC	H	1–2	Jeong Shung-Hoon 54'	5,252	7th
14 August	Gwangju Sangmu FC	A	1–1	Hong Seong-Yo 50'	5,611	7th
21 August	Jeju United FC	A	0–1		4,734	7th
29 August	Chunnam Dragons	H	5–3	Han Sang-Woon 7', 48', 74', Jeong Shung-Hoon 14', Felipe Azevedo 25'	4,643	7th
4 September	Incheon United	A	1–1	Own goal 72'	11,126	8th
11 September	Daejeon Citizen	A	0–2		3,153	8th
18 September	Gangwon FC	H	1–1	Kim Geun-Cheol 46'	5,104	8th
25 September	Ulsan Hyundai FC	H	0–2		4,834	8th
3 October	Daegu FC	A	1–2	Park Hee-Do 76'	15,201	8th
9 October	Seongnam Ilhwa Chunma	H	0–0		4,275	8th
16 October	Pohang Steelers	A	2–2	Park Hee-Do 59', Jeong Shung-Hoon 86'	6,155	8th
27 October	Suwon Samsung Bluewings	H	0–1		2,649	8th
31 October	FC Seoul	A	1–3	Kim Eung-Jin 44'	28,054	8th
3 November	Jeonbuk Hyundai Motors	H	1–0	Jeong Shung-Hoon 52'	4,584	8th

Pos	Team	Pld	W	D	L	GF	GA	GD	Pts	Qualification
6	Gyeongnam FC	28	13	9	6	41	32	+9	48	Qualification for the playoffs first round
7	Suwon Samsung Bluewings	28	12	5	11	39	44	−5	41	Qualification for the Champions League (Note: Qualified as champions of the FA Cup.)
8	Busan IPark	28	8	9	11	36	37	−1	33	
9	Pohang Steelers	28	8	9	11	39	48	−9	33	
10	Jeonnam Dragons	28	8	8	12	40	49	−9	32	

Source: K League (in Korean)
Rules for classification: 1) Points; 2) Goal difference; 3) Goals scored
Notes:

Pos	Team	Qualification
1	FC Seoul (C)	Qualification for the Champions League
2	Jeju United	Qualification for the Champions League
3	Jeonbuk Hyundai Motors	Qualification for the Champions League
4	Seongnam Ilhwa Chunma	
5	Ulsan Hyundai	
6	Gyeongnam FC	

Source: RSSSF
(C) Champions

== Korean FA Cup ==
Date	Round	Opponents	H / A	Result F – A	Scorers	Attendance
21 April	Round of 32	Incheon Korail	H	3–0	Han Sang-Woon 11', Park Hee-Do 17', 49'	365
21 July	Round of 16	FC Seoul	H	2–1	Han Sang-Woon 71', Lee Jung-Ho 84'	3,784
18 August	Quarterfinal	Incheon United	H	2–1 (AET)	Han Sang-Woon 56', Yang Dong-Hyun 97'	4,248
29 September	Semifinal	Chunnam Dragons	H	3–2 (AET)	Yoo Ho-Joon 38', Han Sang-Woon 95', Han Ji-Ho 110'	
24 October	Final	Suwon Samsung Bluewings	H	0–1		

== League Cup ==
=== Group stage ===
Date	Opponents	H / A	Result F – A	Scorers	Attendance	Group position
22 May	Daejeon Citizen	A	4–1	Jeong Shung-Hoon 41', Lee Seung-Hyun 44', Lee Jung-Ho 64', Yang Dong-Hyun 83'	3,914	1st
30 May	Incheon United	H	1–0	Han Sang-Woon 57'	5,084	1st
2 June	Pohang Steelers	A	2–1	Han Sang-Woon 25', Jeong Shung-Hoon 26'	7,213	1st
6 June	Ulsan Hyundai FC	H	2–3	Jeong Shung-Hoon 25', 45'	2,950	1st

Pos	Team	Pld	W	D	L	GF	GA	GD	Pts	BIP	DGU	PHS	ICU	DJC
1	Busan IPark	4	3	0	1	9	5	+4	9	—	2–3	—	1–0	—
2	Daegu FC	4	2	0	2	9	9	0	6	—	—	1–2	—	3–2
3	Pohang Steelers	4	1	2	1	5	5	0	5	1–2	—	—	—	1–1
4	Incheon United	4	1	1	2	6	7	−1	4	—	3–2	1–1	—	—
5	Daejeon Citizen	4	1	1	2	7	10	−3	4	1–4	—	—	3–2	—

Source: RSSSF

=== Knockout stage ===
Date	Round	Opponents	H / A	Result F – A	Scorers	Attendance
14 July	Quarterfinal	Suwon Samsung Bluewings	H	3–3 (5–6p)	Park Hee-Do 16', 57', Yoo Ho-Joon 94'	3,127

== Squad statistics ==
=== Top scorers ===
Position	Nation	Number	Name	K-League	KFA Cup	League Cup	Total
1	(South Korea)	9	Jeong Shung-Hoon	7	0	4	11
=	(South Korea)	20	Han Sang-Woon	5	4	2	11
2	(South Korea)	30	Park Hee-Do	5	2	2	9
3	(South Korea)	14	Yoo Ho-Joon	4	1	1	6
4	(Brazil)	10	Felipe Azevedo	3	0	0	3
5	(South Korea)	3	Hong Seong-Yo	2	0	0	2
=	(South Korea)	27	Kim Chang-Soo	2	0	0	2
=	(South Korea)	29	Kim Eung-Jin	2	0	0	2
=	(South Korea)	4	Lee Jung-Ho	0	1	1	2
=	(South Korea)	18	Yang Dong-Hyun	0	1	1	2
6	(South Korea)	7	Kim Geun-Cheol	1	0	0	1
=	(Brazil)	11	Rômulo	1	0	0	1
=	(South Korea)	15	Choo Sung-Ho	1	0	0	1
=	(South Korea)	27	Kim Chang-Soo	1	0	0	1
=	(South Korea)	22	Han Ji-Ho	0	1	0	1
=	(South Korea)	32	Lee Seung-Hyun	0	0	1	1
/	/	/	Own Goals	2	0	0	2
			TOTALS	36	10	12	58
