= 2010 Korean FA Cup final =

- Event: 2010 Korean FA Cup
Busan IPark	Suwon Samsung Bluewings
0	1
- Date: 24 October 2010
- Venue: Busan Asiad Stadium, Busan
- Man of the Match: Yeom Ki-hun (Suwon Samsung Bluewings)
- Referee: Choi Myung-yong
- Attendance: 31,141

The 2010 Korean FA Cup final was a football match played on 24 October 2010 at Busan Asiad Stadium in Busan that decided the champions of the 2010 Korean FA Cup. It was contested between Busan IPark and Suwon Samsung Bluewings, and kicked off at 16:00 (KST).

== Road to the final ==
Busan IPark		Round	Suwon Samsung Bluewings	
Opponent	Result	Round	Opponent	Result
Incheon Korail (H)	3–0	Round of 32	Dongguk University (H)	2–0
FC Seoul (H)	2–1	Round of 16	Suwon City (H)	4–1
Incheon United (H)	2–1 (a.e.t.)	Quarter-finals	Jeonbuk Hyundai Motors (H)	2–0
Jeonnam Dragons (H)	3–2 (a.e.t.)	Semi-finals	Jeju United (H)	0–0 (a.e.t.) (4–2 p)

== Details ==
24 October 2010
16:00 KST

Busan IPark	0–1	Suwon Samsung Bluewings
		Yeom Ki-hun 26'

Busan Asiad Stadium, Busan
Attendance: 31,141
Referee: Choi Myung-yong

Busan IPark	Suwon Samsung Bluewings

GK	1	(South Korea) Lee Bum-young
CB	5	(South Korea) Kim Dae-keon		(substituted off) 83'
CB	29	(South Korea) Kim Eung-jin
CB	33	(South Korea) Park Woo-hyun
DM	23	(South Korea) Park Jong-woo
DM	14	(South Korea) Yoo Ho-joon		(substituted off) 76'
RM	2	(South Korea) Park Jin-sub (c)
AM	30	(South Korea) Park Hee-do		(substituted off) 46'
LM	27	(South Korea) Kim Chang-soo
SS	22	(South Korea) Han Ji-ho
CF	9	(South Korea) Jeong Shung-hoon	(yellow card) 88'
Substitutes:
GK	21	(South Korea) Jeon Sang-wook
DF	3	(South Korea) Hong Seong-yo
DF	4	(South Korea) Lee Jung-ho		(substituted on) 83'
DF	25	(South Korea) Kim Jong-hoon
MF	6	(South Korea) Seo Dong-won
MF	7	(South Korea) Kim Geun-chol		(substituted on) 76'
FW	18	(South Korea) Yang Dong-hyun
FW	20	(South Korea) Han Sang-woon		(substituted on) 46'
FW	32	(South Korea) Lee Seung-hyun
Manager:
(South Korea) Hwang Sun-hong

GK	40	(South Korea) Ha Kang-jin
CB	25	(South Korea) Choi Sung-hwan	(yellow card) 30'
CB	42	(South Korea) Hwang Jae-won
CB	29	(South Korea) Kwak Hee-ju
RM	5	(China) Li Weifeng	(yellow card) 73'
CM	4	(South Korea) Kim Do-heon (c)
CM	15	(South Korea) Hong Soon-hak	(yellow card) 35'	(substituted off) 89'
LM	32	(South Korea) Moon Min-kui	(yellow card) 75'
RW	7	(South Korea) Lee Sang-ho
LW	26	(South Korea) Yeom Ki-hun
CF	3	(South Korea) Shin Young-rok		(substituted off) 61'
Substitutes:
GK	1	(South Korea) Lee Woon-jae
DF	16	(South Korea) Lee Dong-sik
DF	17	(South Korea) Oh Jae-suk
MF	8	(Brazil) Márcio Diogo
MF	12	(South Korea) Lee Hyun-jin
MF	22	(Japan) Naohiro Takahara
FW	9	(Brazil) José Mota		(substituted on) 61'
FW	27	(South Korea) Im Kyung-hyun
FW	28	(South Korea) Ha Tae-gyun		(substituted on) 89'
Manager:
(South Korea) Yoon Sung-hyo

Man of the Match:
Yeom Ki-hun (Suwon Samsung Bluewings)

Assistant referees:
An Sang-gi
Jeong Hae-sang
Kim Sang-woo
Kim Jong-hyeok
Fourth official:
Yoon Seok-bin

Match rules

- 90 minutes
- 30 minutes of extra time if necessary
- Penalty shoot-out if scores still level
- Nine named substitutes
- Maximum of three substitutions

== See also ==
- 2010 Korean FA Cup
