= 2014 Busan IPark season =

South Korean football club season

Busan IPark is a South Korean football club based in Busan. During the 2014/15 campaign, they competed in the K League Classic and the Korean FA Cup.

== K League Classic ==
| 8 March 2014 Match 1 | Jeonbuk Hyundai Motors | 3 - 0 | Busan IPark | Jeonju |
| 15:00 | Han Kyo-won 39'; Jeong Hyuk 49'; Leonardo 68' | Summary | Kim Eung-jin (yellow card) 41' | Stadium: Jeonju World Cup Stadium; Attendance: 15,687; Referee: (South Korea) Kim Sung-Ho |

| 15 March 2014 Match 2 | Busan IPark | 3 - 1 | Pohang Steelers | Busan |
| 13:00 | Jung Seok-hwa (yellow card) 55'; Lim Sang-hyub 66' 72'; Yang Dong-hyun 82'; Hong Dong-hyun (yellow card) 88' | Summary | Lee Myung-joo 61'; Shin Kwang-hoon (yellow card) 63'; Go Moo-yul (yellow card) 69'; Park Hee-chul (yellow card) 78' | Stadium: Busan Asiad Main Stadium; Attendance: 5,122; Referee: (South Korea) Choi Myung-Yong |

| 23 March 2014 Match 3 | FC Seoul | 0 - 1 | Busan IPark | Seoul |
| 13:00 | | Summary | Hong Dong-hyun (yellow card) 2'; Lee Won-young (yellow card) 16' (yellow-red card); Yang Dong-hyun 23'; Lee Bum-young (yellow card) 71' | Stadium: Seoul World Cup Stadium; Attendance: 16,460; Referee: (South Korea) Lee Min-Hu |

| 26 March 2014 Match 4 | Busan IPark | 1 - 1 | Sangju Sangmu | Busan |
| 18:30 | Fágner (red card) 65'; Yang Dong-hyun 89' | Summary | Seo Sang-min (yellow card) 9'; Lee Sang-ho 39' (pen.); Baek Jong-hwan (yellow card) 65' | Stadium: Busan Asiad Main Stadium; Attendance: 2,088; Referee: (South Korea) Song Min-Seok |

| 30 March 2014 Match 5 | Suwon Bluewings | 1 - 0 | Busan IPark | Suwon |
| 16:00 | Roger (yellow card) 37'; Jong Tae-se 87'; Cho Sung-jin (yellow card) 90' | Summary | Han Ji-ho (yellow card) 49'; Shin Yeon-soo (yellow card) 61' | Stadium: Suwon World Cup Stadium; Attendance: 23,767; Referee: (South Korea) Lee Dong-Jun |

| 6 April 2014 Match 6 | Busan IPark | 0 - 0 | Ulsan Hyundai | Busan |
| 16:00 | Yang Dong-hyun (yellow card) 72' | Summary | Lee Yong (yellow card) 44'; Sung-hwan (yellow card) 48'; Lee Jae-won (yellow card) 82' | Stadium: Busan Asiad Main Stadium; Attendance: 4,088; Referee: (South Korea) Woo Sang-Il |

| 9 April 2014 Match 7 | Incheon United | 0 - 0 | Busan IPark | Incheon |
| 19:30 | An Jae-jun (yellow card) 88' | Summary | | Stadium: Incheon Football Stadium; Attendance: 2,927; Referee: (South Korea) Ryu Hee-Sun |

| 13 April 2014 Match 8 | Jeonnam Dragons | 2 - 1 | Busan IPark | Gwangyang |
| 16:00 | Ahn Yong-woo 5' (yellow card) 38'; Lee Jong-ho 22' | Summary | Yang Dong-hyun 7'; Hong Dong-hyun (yellow card) 11'; Kim Ik-hyun (yellow card) 60'; Park Joon-gang (yellow card) 65' | Stadium: Gwangyang Football Stadium; Attendance: 2,285; Referee: (South Korea) Kim Sung-Ho |

| 19 April 2014 Match 9 | Busan IPark | 1 - 0 | Seongnam FC | Busan |
| 16:00 | Fágner 5'; Yang Dong-hyun (yellow card) 24'; Park Joon-gang (yellow card) 87' (yellow-red card) | Summary | | Stadium: Busan Asiad Main Stadium; Attendance: 1,134; Referee: (South Korea) Kim Sang-Woo |

| 26 April 2014 Match 10 | Jeju United | 2 - 1 | Busan IPark | Jeju Province |
| 16:00 | Kim Soo-beom (yellow card) 51'; Yoon Bit-garam 59'; Jin Dae-sung 84' | Summary | Jovanović 12' (o.g.); Kim Chan-young (yellow card) 87' | Stadium: Jeju World Cup Stadium; Attendance: 5,766; Referee: (South Korea) Choi Myung-Yong |

| 4 May 2014 Match 11 | Busan IPark | 2 - 2 | Gyeongnam | Busan |
| 16:00 | Lim Sang-hyub 13'; Jung Seok-hwa 27' (yellow card) 53'; Lee Kyung-ryul (yellow card) 57'; Nilson (yellow card) 77'; Park Joon-gang (yellow card) 90' | Summary | Lee Hak-min (yellow card) 14'; Lee Kyung-ryul 68' (o.g.); Song Soo-young 80' | Stadium: Busan Asiad Main Stadium; Attendance: 3,826; Referee: (South Korea) Song Min-Seok |

| 11 May 2014 Match 12 | Ulsan Hyundai | 3 - 0 | Busan IPark | Ulsan |
| 16:00 | Kim Yong-tae 10' (yellow card) 40'; Jeong Dong-ho (yellow card) 16' kim Young-sam (yellow card) 59'; Ahn Jin-beom 61'; Han Sang-woon 76' | Summary | Lee Won-young (yellow card) 9'; Lim Sang-hyub (yellow card) 65'; Kim Ik-hyun (yellow card) 90' | Stadium: Ulsan Munsu Football Stadium; Attendance: 6,545; Referee: (South Korea) Lee Dong-Jun |

| 5 July 2014 Match 13 | Busan IPark | 0 - 2 | Jeonbuk Hyundai Motors | Busan |
| 19:30 | | Summary | Lee Jae-sung 14'; Han Kyo-won 48' | Stadium: Busan Asiad Main Stadium; Attendance: 2,836; Referee: (South Korea) Yoo Sun-Ho |

| 9 July 2014 Match 14 | Sangju Sangmu | 2 - 0 | Busan IPark | Sangju |
| 19:00 | Kwon Soon-hyung 81'; Lee Sang-ho 90+6' | Summary | | Stadium: Sangju Civic Stadium; Attendance: 2,836; Referee: (South Korea) Lee Dong-Jun |

| 13 July 2014 Match 15 | Busan IPark | 2 - 2 | Incheon United | Busan |
| 19:30 | Fágner 51' 79' | Summary | Moon Sang-yoon 66'; Ivo 87' | Stadium: Busan Asiad Main Stadium; Attendance: 3,827; Referee: (South Korea) Kim Sung-Ho |

| 20 July 2014 Match 16 | Pohang Steelers | 2 - 0 | Busan IPark | Pohang |
| 20:00 | Kang Su-il 59'; Shin Kwang-hoon 72' (pen.) | Summary | | Stadium: Pohang Steel Yard; Attendance: 13,553; Referee: (South Korea) Kim Dong-Jin |

| 23 July 2014 Match 17 | Busan IPark | 0 - 2 | Suwon Bluewings | Busan |
| 20:30 | | Summary | Jong Tae-se 45+1'; Santos 79' | Stadium: Busan Asiad Main Stadium; Attendance: 3,525; Referee: (South Korea) Kim Jong-Hyeok |

| 2 August 2014 Match 18 | Busan IPark | 1 - 1 | Jeju United | Busan |
| 20:30 | Lim Sang-hyub 68' | Summary | Hwang Il-su 82' | Stadium: Busan Asiad Main Stadium; Attendance: 1,507; Referee: (South Korea) Choi Myung-Yong |

| 6 August 2014 Match 19 | Gyeongnam | 1 - 1 | Busan IPark | Changwon |
| 20:30 | Junuzović 53' | Summary | Park Yong-ji 23' | Stadium: Changwon Football Center; Attendance: 2,401; Referee: (South Korea) Kim Sang-Woo |

| 10 August 2014 Match 20 | Busan IPark | 0 - 2 | FC Seoul | Busan |
| 20:30 | Jang Hak-young (yellow card) 77' | Summary | Osmar Barba (yellow card) 54'; Molina 79' (pen.); Escudero 89' | Stadium: Busan Asiad Main Stadium; Attendance: 4,954; Referee: (South Korea) Lee Min-Hu |

| 17 August 2014 Match 21 | Seongnam FC | 2 - 4 | Busan IPark | Seongnam |
| 20:30 | Lee Yo-han (yellow card) 25' (yellow-red card); Park Hee-sung (yellow card) 31'; Kim Dong-hee 60'; Djeparov 89' | Summary | Lim Sang-hyub 8' 83' (yellow card) 37'; Hwang Jae-hun (yellow card) 22'; Fágner 30' (pen.); Ju Se-jong 84'; Han Ji-ho (yellow card) 87' | Stadium: Tancheon Sports Complex; Attendance: 3,785; Referee: (South Korea) Ryu Hee-Sun |

| 24 August 2014 Match 22 | Busan IPark | 0 - 1 | Jeonnam Dragons | Busan |
| 20:30 | Han Ji-ho (yellow card) 82' | Summary | Hong Jin-gi (yellow card) 54'; Ristić 90' | Stadium: Busan Asiad Main Stadium; Attendance: 2,248; Referee: (South Korea) Choi Myung-Yong |

| 30 August 2014 Match 23 | Incheon United | 3 - 0 | Busan IPark | Incheon |
| 20:00 | Koo Bon-sang (yellow card) 5'; Ivo 21' (pen.) 40'; Kim Do-hyuk 73' | Summary | Hong Dong-hyun (yellow card) 29'; Jacio Marcos de Jesus (yellow card) 75' | Stadium: Incheon Football Stadium; Attendance: 7,251; Referee: (South Korea) Ko Hyung-Jin |

| 3 September 2014 Match 24 | Suwon Samsung Bluewings | 1 - 1 | Busan IPark | Suwon |
| 20:30 | Roger 22' (pen.) | Summary | Hwang Jae-hun (yellow card) 21'; Kwon Jin-young (yellow card) 57'; Kim Ik-hyun 60' | Stadium: Suwon World Cup Stadium; Attendance: 6,527; Referee: (South Korea) Song Min-Seok |

| 10 September 2014 Match 25 | Busan IPark | 1 - 1 | Jeonbuk Hyundai Motors | Busan |
| 20:30 | Yoo Ji-no (yellow card) 31'; Kim Ik-hyun (yellow card) 70' (yellow-red card); Fágner 73' (pen.); Park Yong-ji (yellow card) 74' | Summary | Jeong Hyuk (yellow card) 26'; Lee Dong-gook 58'; Choi Chul-soon (yellow card) 70' | Stadium: Busan Asiad Main Stadium; Attendance: 3,005; Referee: (South Korea) Choi Myung-Yong |

| 13 September 2014 Match 26 | Busan IPark | 1 - 3 | Ulsan Hyundai | Busan |
| 20:30 | Yeon Je-Min (yellow card) 30'; Lee Kyung-ryul 49'; Ju Se-jong (yellow card) 77' | Summary | Kim Sung-hwan (yellow card) 40' (goal) 64'; Baek Ji-hoon 52'; Lee Jae-won (yellow card) 72'; Ahn Jin-beom 88' | Stadium: Busan Asiad Main Stadium; Attendance: 3,012; Referee: (South Korea) Yoo Sun-Ho |

| 21 September 2014 Match 27 | Jeonnam Dragons | 2 - 1 | Busan IPark | Gwangyang |
| 14:00 | Cornthwaite (yellow card) 15'; Kim Young-woo (yellow card) 50'; Song Chang-ho 59'; Shim Dong-woon 62' | Summary | Fágner 76'; Lee Kyung-ryul (yellow card) 82' | Stadium: Gwangyang Football Stadium; Attendance: 2,328; Referee: (South Korea) Kim Dong-Jin |
