= Lee Sung-woon =

South Korean footballer (born 1978)

Personal information
- Full name: Lee Sung-woon (이성운)
- Date of birth: December 25, 1978 (age 47)
- Place of birth: Busan, South Korea
- Height: 1.73 m (5 ft 8 in)
- Position: Midfielder

Senior career*
Years	Team	Apps	(Gls)
2001–2006	Seongnam Ilhwa Chunma	14	(0)
2005–2006	→ Police (army)		
2007–2009	Daejeon Citizen	54	(2)
2010–2011	Daejeon KHNP	38	(1)
2011–2014	Busan I'Park	14	(0)
- * Club domestic league appearances and goals as of 10 December 2013

Lee Sung-woon (born December 25, 1978) is a South Korean retired football player. He formerly played for Seongnam Ilhwa Chunma, Daejeon Citizen, and Busan IPark.
