= Kim Ik-hyun =

South Korean footballer

Kim Ik-Hyun
Personal information
- Full name: Kim Ik-Hyun
- Date of birth: 30 April 1989 (age 37)
- Place of birth: South Korea
- Height: 1.77 m (5 ft 9 1/2 in)
- Position: Midfielder

Youth career
- 2008: Korea University

Senior career*
| Years | Team | Apps | (Gls) |
| 2009–2014 | Busan IPark | 55 | (2) |
| 2015 | Busan IPark | 7 | (0) |
- * Club domestic league appearances and goals as of 28 November 2015

Kim Ik-Hyun (Korean: 김익현, born 30 April 1989) is a South Korean football midfielder. He is best known for his time with Busan I'Park.

== Club career ==
Kim joined Busan I'Park in 2009 as a draft pick from Korea University. Largely unused in his first four seasons with the club, Kim featured more regularly in the 2013 season, most commonly in a holding midfield role alongside Park Jong-Woo. He scored his first goal for the club on 28 August 2013 in a league match against Jeju United.

He was released by Busan in January 2015, but rejoined the team in July as they were eventually relegated to the K League 2. Kim joined Hwaseong FC in 2017 and later played for Gyeongju Citizen and Yangju Citizen.

== Club career statistics ==
As of 6 December 2015

| Club performance | | | League | | Cup | | League Cup | | Playoff | | Total | |
| Season | Club | League | Apps | Goals | Apps | Goals | Apps | Goals | Apps | Goals | Apps | Goals |
| South Korea | | | League | | KFA Cup | | League Cup | | Playoff | | Total | |
|---|---|---|---|---|---|---|---|---|---|---|---|---|
| 2009 | Busan I'Park | K-League | 2 | 0 | 0 | 0 | 0 | 0 | - | - | 2 | 0 |
| 2010 | Busan I'Park | K-League | 0 | 0 | 0 | 0 | 0 | 0 | - | - | 0 | 0 |
| 2011 | Busan I'Park | K-League | 6 | 0 | 1 | 0 | 3 | 0 | - | - | 10 | 0 |
| 2012 | Busan I'Park | K-League | 6 | 0 | 0 | 0 | - | | - | - | 6 | 0 |
| 2013 | Busan I'Park | KL Classic | 22 | 1 | 3 | 0 | - | | - | - | 25 | 1 |
| 2014 | Busan I'Park | KL Classic | 19 | 1 | 3 | 0 | - | - | - | - | 22 | 1 |
| 2015 | Busan I'Park | KL Classic | 7 | 0 | 0 | 0 | - | - | 1 | 0 | 8 | 0 |
| Career total | | | 62 | 2 | 7 | 0 | 3 | 0 | 1 | 0 | 73 | 2 |
