= Lee Won-kyu =

South Korean footballer (born 1988)

Lee Won-Kyu
Personal information
- Full name: Lee Won-Kyu
- Date of birth: May 1, 1988 (age 38)
- Place of birth: South Korea
- Height: 1.81 m (5 ft 11 1/2 in)
- Position: Defender

Youth career
- 2007–2010: Yonsei University

Senior career*
Years	Team	Apps	(Gls)
2011–2012	Busan I'Park	4	(1)
- * Club domestic league appearances and goals as of 3 March 2013

Lee Won-Kyu (Korean: 이원규) is a South Korean football player, who last played for K-League side Busan I'Park as a defender.

== Club career ==
Lee joined Busan I'Park as a draft pick from Yonsei University. Lee made his professional debut in the first round of the 2011 K-League, against Jeju United. The following week, against Sangju Sangmu FC in a tightly contested match, Lee scored his first goal in extra time which ensured a 3 - 3 draw for Busan.

== Club career statistics ==
As of 18 December 2012

Club performance			League		Cup		League Cup		Total	
Season	Club	League	Apps	Goals	Apps	Goals	Apps	Goals	Apps	Goals
South Korea			League		KFA Cup		League Cup		Total	
2011	Busan I'Park	K-League	3	1	0	0	0	0	3	1
2012	Busan I'Park	K-League	1	0	0	0	-		1	0
Career total			4	1	0	0	0	0	4	1
