= Kim Chan-young =

South Korean footballer (born 1989)

Kim Chan-Young
Personal information
- Full name: Kim Chan-Young
- Date of birth: 1 April 1989 (age 37)
- Place of birth: South Korea
- Height: 1.91 m (6 ft 3 in)
- Position: Centre back

Team information
- Current team: Kasetsart

Youth career
- Kyunghee University

Senior career*
Years	Team	Apps	(Gls)
2011–2012	Mokpo City	20	(1)
2013	Tonan Maebashi		
2014–2015	Busan IPark	32	(0)
2016	Gangneung City	28	(1)
2017	Gimhae	8	(0)
2017	Kasetsart		(0)
2017	Anyang		(0)
2018	Gangneung City		(0)
2019–	Byeoksan Players		(0)
- * Club domestic league appearances and goals as of 1 November 2019

Kim Chan-Young (Korean: 김찬영; born 1 April 1989) is a South Korean footballer.

== Career ==
He joined Mokpo City in 2011 and made 20 appearances for the team before moving to Japan.

In 2014, he returned to his homeland and signed with Busan IPark.
