= Jeong Min-hyeong =

South Korean footballer (1987-2012)

Jeong Min-Hyeong
Personal information
- Full name: Jeong Min-Hyeong
- Date of birth: 14 May 1987
- Place of birth: South Korea
- Date of death: 4 July 2012 (aged 25)
- Place of death: Yangju, South Korea
- Height: 1.76 m (5 ft 9 1/2 in)
- Position: Midfielder

Youth career
- 2006–2009: International University of Korea

Senior career*
Years	Team	Apps	(Gls)
2010–2012	Busan IPark	7	(0)
Total		7	(0)
- * Club domestic league appearances and goals as of 1 July 2012

Jeong Min-Hyeong (Korean: 정민형; 14 May 1987 – 4 July 2012) was a South Korean footballer who played as a midfielder for Busan IPark in the K-League.

He attended International University of Korea before embarking on a professional football career.

== Death ==
On July 4, 2012, Jeong was found dead in his car which was parked in the outskirts of Yangju, Gyeonggi Province, after disappearing for 4 days. In the car police discovered a burned Yeontan and a suicide note.
