= Song Soo-young =

South Korean footballer

Song Soo-Young
Personal information
- Full name: Song Soo-Young
- Date of birth: 8 July 1991 (age 35)
- Place of birth: South Korea
- Height: 1.72 m (5 ft 7 1/2 in)
- Position: Striker

Team information
- Current team: Suwon FC
- Number: 22

Youth career
- 2010–2013: Yonsei University

Senior career*
Years	Team	Apps	(Gls)
2014–2016	Gyeongnam FC	79	(14)
2015	→ Jeju United (loan)	4	(0)
2017–	Suwon FC	30	(2)
2018–2019	→ Sangju Sangmu (army)	18	(0)
- * Club domestic league appearances and goals as of 29 November 2019

Song Soo-Young (Korean: 송수영; born 8 July 1991) is a South Korean footballer who plays as striker for Suwon FC in K League 2.

== Career ==
He signed with Gyeongnam FC before 2014 season.
