= Lee Yo-han =

South Korean footballer (born 1985)

Lee Yo-Han
Personal information
- Full name: Lee Yo-Han
- Date of birth: 18 December 1985 (age 40)
- Place of birth: Seoul, South Korea
- Height: 1.84 m (6 ft 0 in)
- Position: Defender

Senior career*
Years	Team	Apps	(Gls)
2004–2006	Incheon United	19	(0)
2007	Jeju United	17	(0)
2008–2010	Jeonbuk Hyundai Motors	29	(1)
2011–2012	Busan I'Park	14	(0)
2013– 2015	Seongnam FC	26	(0)

International career^{‡}
2003–2005	South Korea U-20	26	(0)
2007	South Korea U-23	7	(0)
- * Club domestic league appearances and goals as of 9 December 2015 ‡ National team caps and goals as of 7 July 2007

- Lee Yo-han
- Hangul: 이요한
- Hanja: 李曜漢
- RR: I Yohan
- MR: I Yohan

Lee Yo-Han (Korean: 이요한; born 18 December 1985) is a South Korean football player who plays as defender.

He played at the 2005 FIFA World Youth Championship in Netherlands, and played all match of South Korea that ended 3rd of Group F. He was also called up to South Korea U-23 team for 2008 Olympic Games.

He is playing 55 games in K-League. 42 games are in Incheon United, 17 games in Jeju United.

On 11 January 2011, Lee was transferred to Busan I'Park with Lim Sang-Hyub in exchange with Jeong Shung-Hoon and Lee Seung-Hyun.

== Club career statistics ==
Club performance			League		Cup		League Cup		Continental		Total	
Season	Club	League	Apps	Goals	Apps	Goals	Apps	Goals	Apps	Goals	Apps	Goals
South Korea			League		KFA Cup		League Cup		Asia		Total	
2004	Incheon United	K-League	1	0	0	0	7	0	-		8	0
2005	Incheon United	K-League	8	0	2	0	9	0	-		19	0
2006	Incheon United	K-League	11	0	2	0	6	0	-		19	0
2007	Jeju United	K-League	17	0	4	0	4	0	-		25	0
2008	Jeonbuk Hyundai	K-League	10	0	0	0	5	1	-		15	1
2009	Jeonbuk Hyundai	K-League	13	0	3	0	0	0	-		16	0
2010	Jeonbuk Hyundai	K-League	6	1	1	0	4	1			11	2
2011	Busan I'Park	K-League	15	0	1	0	3	0	-		19	0
2012	Busan I'Park	K-League	0	0	0	0	0	0	-		0	0
2013	Seongnam Ilhwa	K-League	0	0	0	0	0	0	-		0	0
Career total			81	1	13	0	38	2			132	3

== Honors ==
=== Club ===
Jeonbuk Hyundai Motors

- K-League (1): 2009
