= Lee Dong-won (footballer) =

South Korean footballer

Lee Dong-Won
Personal information
- Full name: Lee Dong-Won (이동원)
- Date of birth: November 7, 1983 (age 43)
- Place of birth: North Korea
- Height: 1.88 m (6 ft 2 in)
- Position: Defender

Youth career
- 2002–2004: Soongsil University

Senior career*
Years	Team	Apps	(Gls)
2005–2006	Chunnam Dragons	22	(2)
2007	Incheon United	21	(1)
2008	Daejeon Citizen	21	(2)
2009–2011	Ulsan Hyundai	25	(0)
2011	Busan I'Park	6	(0)
2012	Chainat	28	(8)
2013–2014	Sriwijaya	21	(0)

International career
2000–2001	North Korea U-17	10	(?)
2005–2006	South Korea U-23	5	(0)
Korean name
Hangul	이동원
RR	I Dongwon
MR	I Tongwŏn
- * Club domestic league appearances and goals as of 14 July 2011

Lee Dong-Won (born November 7, 1983) is a South Korean former footballer who plays as a defender.
