= Jeong Shung-hoon =

South Korean footballer (born 1979)

Jeong Shung-hoon 정성훈
Personal information
- Full name: Jeong Shung-hoon
- Date of birth: 4 July 1979 (age 47)
- Place of birth: Changwon, Gyeongnam, South Korea
- Height: 1.91 m (6 ft 3 in)
- Position: Striker

Youth career
- 1998–2001: Kyung Hee University

Senior career*
Years	Team	Apps	(Gls)
2002–2003	Ulsan Hyundai Horang-i	30	(0)
2004–2007	Daejeon Citizen	42	(6)
2008–2010	Busan I'Park	60	(19)
2011–2012	Jeonbuk Hyundai Motors	39	(7)
2012	Chunnam Dragons	13	(3)
2013	Daejeon Citizen	6	(2)
2013	Gyeongnam FC	10	(1)
2014	Consadole Sapporo	9	(1)
2015–2017	Gimhae FC	49	(8)
2017	Bucheon FC	9	(1)

International career
2008–2009	South Korea	8	(0)
- * Club domestic league appearances and goals as of 1 January 2018

- Jeong Shung-hoon
- Hangul: 정성훈
- Hanja: 丁成勳
- RR: Jeong Seonghun
- MR: Chŏng Sŏnghun

Jeong Shung-hoon (Korean: 정성훈; born 4 July 1979) is a South Korean footballer who most recently played for Bucheon FC as striker. He has also represented South Korea national football team.

== Career ==
He started his career at Ulsan Hyundai Horang-i in 2002. He was a promising striker and was selected for the South Korean national team for the 2001 Universiade game, but didn't play very well. He said in an interview that "I was under stress that I had to play well to make something impressive, so I think it is the main reason I couldn't make many goals or contributions to team." Then, finally, he transferred to Daejeon Citizen, making a turning point in his career.

However, he did not fulfil his role in Daejeon Citizen, and could not impress fans of the club. He seemed to have disappeared in Daejeon Citizen's sight. Despite this, he seemed revived at Purple Arena (Nickname of Daejeon World Cup Stadium) after the mid-2006 season. He created a fantastic goal in the first league game after the 2006 World Cup against Ulsan Hyundai Horang-i, and continuously played a pivotal role in the attacking line and managed to score 8 goals in the remainder of the season.

Then he moved to Busan I'Park, in an exchange with Park Sung-Ho, in 2008. Since then, he has impressed the fans with great ability as a target man, and has made his debut for the South Korea national football team on 15 October 2008. At the match against FC Seoul, he clapped at a referee's decision to give a red card at Adi, FC Seoul player. His bad performance whilst playing for South Korea national football team disappointed Korean soccer fans and Huh Jung-Moo, and resulted in the return of Lee Dong-Gook in the national team.

On 11 January 2011, he was transferred from Busan I'Park to the Jeonbuk Hyundai Motors with Lee Seung-Hyun for Lee Yo-Han and Lim Sang-Hyub. He made his Jeonbuk debut on 2 March in a 1–0 Champions League group stage win over Shandong Luneng.

On 31 July 2012, during the 2012 summer transfer windows, Jeong was transferred to Chunnam Dragons for forward Kim Shin-young.

== Club statistics ==
Club performance			League		Cup		League Cup		Continental		Total	
Season	Club	League	Apps	Goals	Apps	Goals	Apps	Goals	Apps	Goals	Apps	Goals
2002	Ulsan Hyundai FC	K-League	15	0	?	?	9	2	-			
2003	Ulsan Hyundai FC	K-League	15	0	3	0	-		-		18	0
2004	Daejeon Citizen	K-League	7	0	4	0	6	2	-		17	2
2005	Daejeon Citizen	K-League	4	1	2	0	1	0	-		7	1
2006	Daejeon Citizen	K-League	18	3	2	1	8	5	-		28	9
2007	Daejeon Citizen	K-League	13	2	1	0	6	1	-		20	3
2008	Busan I'Park	K-League	22	5	1	1	9	3	-		32	9
2009	Busan I'Park	K-League	12	7	1	0	4	1	-		17	8
2010	Busan I'Park	K-League	26	7	5	0	5	4	-		36	11
2011	Jeonbuk Hyundai Motors	K-League	24	5	1	0	1	0	8	0	34	5
2012	Jeonbuk Hyundai Motors	K-League	14	2	2	1	-		3	1	19	4
2012	Chunnam Dragons	K-League	13	3	-		-		-		13	3
Career total			183	35	22	3	49	18	11	1	365	57
