= Noh Yong-hun =

South Korean footballer (born 1986)

Noh Yong-Hoon
Personal information
- Full name: Noh Yong-Hoon
- Date of birth: 29 March 1986 (age 40)
- Place of birth: South Korea
- Height: 1.70 m (5 ft 7 in)
- Position: Midfielder

Youth career
- Yonsei University

Senior career*
Years	Team	Apps	(Gls)
2009–2010	Gyeongnam FC	7	(0)
2011	Busan I'Park	0	(0)
2011	Daejeon Citizen	10	(0)
2012	Gangwon FC	3	(0)
2012	Daejeon Citizen	9	(0)
- * Club domestic league appearances and goals as of 19 December 2012

Noh Yong-Hoon (Korean: 노용훈; born 29 March 1986) is a South Korean football player who last played for Daejeon Citizen.

== Career statistics ==
As of end of the 2012 season

Club performance			League		Cup		League Cup		Total	
Season	Club	League	Apps	Goals	Apps	Goals	Apps	Goals	Apps	Goals
Korea Republic			League		FA Cup		K-League Cup		Total	
2009	Gyeongnam FC	K-League	7	0	0	0	3	0	10	0
2010	Gyeongnam FC	K-League	0	0	0	0	0	0	0	0
2011	Busan I'Park	K-League	0	0	0	0	1	0	1	0
2011	Daejeon Citizen	K-League	10	0	0	0	0	0	10	0
2012	Gangwon FC	K-League	3	0	0	0	-		3	0
2012	Daejeon Citizen	K-League	9	0	0	0	-		9	0
Total			29	0	0	0	4	0	33	0
