= Choo Sung-ho =

South Korean footballer (born 1987)

Personal information
- Full name: Choo Sung-ho
- Date of birth: August 26, 1987 (age 39)
- Place of birth: South Korea
- Height: 1.81 m (5 ft 11 1/2 in)
- Position: Defender

Team information
- Current team: Gimhae City

Youth career
- 2006–2009: Dong-A University

Senior career*
Years	Team	Apps	(Gls)
2010–2011	Busan I'Park	10	(1)
2012–	Gimhae City	11	(2)
- * Club domestic league appearances and goals as of 8 January 2014

Choo Sung-ho (Korean: 추성호; born 26 August 1987) is a South Korean football player, who currently played for Korea National League club Gimhae City FC as a defender. He formerly played for K-League side Busan I'Park.

== Club career ==
Choo joined Busan I'Park as a draft pick from Dong-A University for the 2010 K-League season. Choo scored the first goal of his professional career in his debut match for his new club, a league match against Jeonbuk Motors on 31 July 2010.

== Club career statistics ==
As of 8 January 2014

Club performance			League		Cup		League Cup		Total	
Season	Club	League	Apps	Goals	Apps	Goals	Apps	Goals	Apps	Goals
South Korea			League		KFA Cup		League Cup		Total	
2010	Busan I'Park	K-League	4	1	0	0	0	0	4	1
2011	Busan I'Park	K-League	6	0	2	0	5	1	13	1
2012	Gimhae City	Korea National League	11	2	0	0	-		11	2
Career total			21	3	2	0	5	1	28	4
