= Park Woo-hyun =

South Korean footballer (born 1980)

Park Woo-Hyun
Personal information
- Full name: Park Woo-Hyun (박우현)
- Date of birth: April 28, 1980 (age 46)
- Place of birth: Sokcho, Gangwon, South Korea
- Height: 1.79 m (5 ft 10 in)
- Position: Defender

Youth career
- University of Incheon

Senior career*
Years	Team	Apps	(Gls)
2003–2009	Seongnam Ilhwa Chunma	44	(1)
2010–2011	Busan I'Park	14	(0)
2011–2012	Gangwon FC	40	(0)
- * Club domestic league appearances and goals as of 20 December 2012

Park Woo-Hyun (born April 28, 1980) is a South Korean football player who last played for Gangwon FC.

== Career statistics ==
As of 31 October 2011

Club performance			League		Cup		League Cup		Continental		Total	
Season	Club	League	Apps	Goals	Apps	Goals	Apps	Goals	Apps	Goals	Apps	Goals
Korea Republic			League		FA Cup		K-League Cup		Asia		Total	
2003	Seongnam Ilhwa Chunma	K-League	0	0	0	0	-					
2004	Seongnam Ilhwa Chunma	K-League	12	0	1	0	12	0				
2005	Seongnam Ilhwa Chunma	K-League	6	1	1	0	6	0	-		13	1
2006	Seongnam Ilhwa Chunma	K-League	5	0	1	0	9	1	-		15	1
2007	Seongnam Ilhwa Chunma	K-League	0	0	0	0	0	0	0	0	0	0
2008	Seongnam Ilhwa Chunma	K-League	10	0	3	0	7	0	-		20	0
2009	Seongnam Ilhwa Chunma	K-League	11	0	2	0	0	0	-		13	0
2010	Busan I'Park	K-League	14	0	1	0	1	0	-		16	0
2011	Busan I'Park	K-League	0	0	0	0	0	0	-		0	0
2011	Gangwon FC	K-League	6	0	1	0	0	0	-		7	0
2012	Gangwon FC	K-League	34	0	0	0	-		-		34	0
Total			98	1	10	0	35	0				
