= Jeon Sang-wook (footballer) =

South Korean footballer (born 1979)

Jeon Sang-Wook
Personal information
- Full name: Jeon Sang-Wook (전상욱)
- Date of birth: September 22, 1979 (age 47)
- Place of birth: South Korea
- Height: 1.91 m (6 ft 3 in)
- Position: Goalkeeper

Team information
- Current team: Seongnam FC (U-10 Youth Team Coach)

Senior career*
Years	Team	Apps	(Gls)
2004	Ulsan Hyundai Mipo Dolphin	7	(0)
2005–2009	Seongnam Ilhwa Chunma	5	(0)
2010–2012	Busan I'Park	69	(0)
2013–2016	Seongnam FC	48	(0)
- * Club domestic league appearances and goals

Jeon Sang-Wook (born September 22, 1979) is a current Seongnam FC football coach and a former South Korean football player who played for Seongnam FC as a goalkeeper. (formerly National League side Ulsan Hyundai Mipo Dockyard and Busan I'Park).

== Club career ==
He retired from playing career due to Nasopharynx cancer. His last professional game was for Seongnam FC on 1 May 2016. He was already suffered much then but Seongnam FC let him play for 3 minutes extra time to let him say goodbye to the fans.

== Managerial career ==
On 7 February 2017, he announced the recovery from the cancer and Seongnam FC appointed him as an Under 10s Youth Team Coach.
