= Lee Won-young =

South Korean footballer (born 1981)

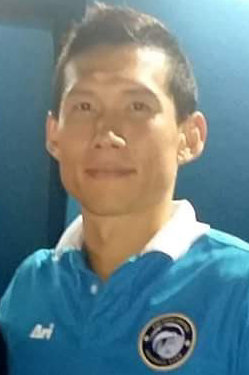

Personal information
- Date of birth: 13 March 1981 (age 45)
- Place of birth: South Korea
- Height: 1.86 m (6 ft 1 in)
- Position: Defender

Youth career
- 1997–1999: Boin High School

Senior career*
Years	Team	Apps	(Gls)
2000–2006	Pohang Steelers	29	(4)
2007	Jeonbuk Hyundai Motors	20	(1)
2008	Jeju United	24	(1)
2009–2011	Busan I'Park	52	(4)
2011	Al-Ittifaq	2	(0)
2013–2014	Busan IPark	46	(2)
2015	Pattaya United	34	(10)
2016	Busan IPark	24	(2)
2017–2018	Pattaya United	62	(10)
2019	Samut Sakhon	2	(1)
2022	Goyang KH	0	(0)
- * Club domestic league appearances and goals as of 17 July 2022

- Lee Won-young
- Hangul: 이원영
- RR: I Wonyeong
- MR: I Wŏnyŏng

Former name
- Hangul: 이정호
- Hanja: 李正浩
- RR: I Jeongho
- MR: I Chŏngho

Lee Won-young (Korean: 이원영; born 13 March 1981) is a South Korea footballer who plays for K4 League side Goyang KH. In 2013, he was renamed from Lee Jung-ho to Lee Won-young.

He has played for formerly Pohang Steelers, Jeonbuk Hyundai Motors, Jeju United, Saudi Arabia side Al-Ittifaq and Thai team Pattaya United.

== Club career statistics (Busan IPark) ==
As of 5 November 2016

Club performance			League		Cup		League Cup		Total	
Season	Club	League	Apps	Goals	Apps	Goals	Apps	Goals	Apps	Goals
South Korea			League		KFA Cup		League Cup		Total	
2009	Busan IPark	K League 1	18	2	0	0	7	1	25	3
2010	Busan IPark	K League 1	22	0	0	0	5	1	27	1
2011	Busan IPark	K League 1	12	2	0	0	2	0	14	2
2013	Busan IPark	K League 1	32	2	1	1	-	-	33	3
2014	Busan IPark	K League 1	14	0	2	0	-	-	16	0
2016	Busan IPark	K League 2	24	2	3	1	0	0	27	3
Career total			122	8	6	2	14	2	142	12
