= Kim Chang-soo =

South Korean footballer (born 1985)

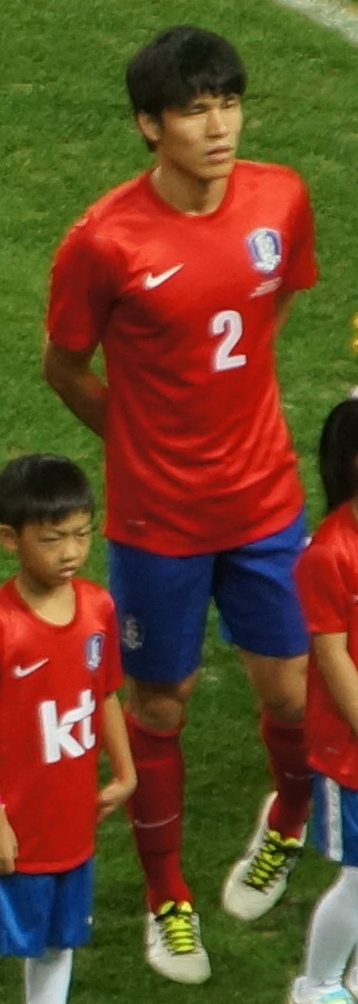
- Kim with South Korea in 2013

Personal information
- Full name: Kim Chang-soo
- Date of birth: 12 September 1985 (age 41)
- Place of birth: Yeosu, Jeonnam, South Korea
- Height: 1.79 m (5 ft 10 in)
- Position: Right-back

Senior career*
Years	Team	Apps	(Gls)
2004	Ulsan Hyundai Horang-i	0	(0)
2005–2007	Daejeon Citizen	24	(1)
2008–2012	Busan IPark	126	(7)
2013–2015	Kashiwa Reysol	69	(0)
2016	Jeonbuk Hyundai Motors	8	(0)
2017–2019	Ulsan Hyundai	64	(0)
2020	Gwangju FC	24	(0)
2021–2023	Incheon United	21	(0)
2023	Cheonan City	13	(0)

International career
2006–2012	South Korea U23	23 (Note: Includes six appearances as an overage player (four appearances in Summer Olympics, two appearances in friendlies).)	(1)
2009–2017	South Korea	25	(0)
Medal record
Men's football
Representing South Korea
Olympic Games
Bronze medal – third place	2012 London	Team
AFC Asian Cup
Silver medal – second place	2015 Australia	Team
EAFF Championship
Bronze medal – third place	2013 South Korea	Team
- * Club domestic league appearances and goals as of 23 October 2022

- Kim Chang-soo
- Hangul: 김창수
- Hanja: 金昌洙
- RR: Gim Changsu
- MR: Kim Ch'angsu

Kim Chang-soo (Korean: 김창수, Korean pronunciation: [kim.tɕʰaŋ.su]; born 12 September 1985) is a South Korean former footballer who played as right back.

== International career ==
On 1 February 2009, he played at first senior level game for South Korea against Syria national football team.

He was part of the South Korean team that won a bronze medal at the 2012 Summer Olympics.

Kim appeared for South Korea in two qualifying matches for the 2014 FIFA World Cup. He was selected to the 23-man squad for the final tournament in Brazil, but did not appear in any matches as Lee Yong started all three of South Korea's matches at right-back.

== Career statistics ==
=== Club ===
Appearances and goals by club, season and competition
Club	Season	League			National cup		League cup		Continental		Other		Total	
Club	Season	Division	Apps	Goals	Apps	Goals	Apps	Goals	Apps	Goals	Apps	Goals	Apps	Goals
Ulsan Hyundai Horang-i	2004	K League	0	0	0	0	1	0	—		—		1	0
Daejeon Citizen	2005	K League	0	0	1	0	0	0	—		—		1	0
Daejeon Citizen	2006	K League	7	0	0	0	3	0	—		—		10	0
Daejeon Citizen	2007	K League	17	1	2	0	6	0	—		—		25	1
Daejeon Citizen	Total		24	1	3	0	9	0	—		—		36	1
Busan IPark	2008	K League	23	1	2	0	5	0	—		—		30	1
Busan IPark	2009	K League	20	1	1	0	4	0	—		—		25	1
Busan IPark	2010	K League	27	2	5	0	5	0	—		—		37	2
Busan IPark	2011	K League	28	1	3	0	6	0	—		—		37	1
Busan IPark	2012	K League	28	2	1	0	—		—		—		29	2
Busan IPark	Total		126	7	12	0	20	0	—		—		158	7
Kashiwa Reysol	2013	J1 League	24	0	0	0	0	0	7	0	1 (Note: Appearance in Japanese Super Cup)	0	32	0
Kashiwa Reysol	2014	J1 League	14	0	0	0	0	0	—		0	0	14	0
Kashiwa Reysol	2015	J1 League	31	0	2	0	1	0	9	1	—		43	1
Kashiwa Reysol	Total		69	0	2	0	1	0	16	1	1	0	89	1
Jeonbuk Hyundai Motors	2016	K League 1	8	0	0	0	—		8	0	1 (Note: Appearance in FIFA Club World Cup)	0	17	0
Ulsan Hyundai	2017	K League 1	29	0	5	0	—		5	0	—		39	0
Ulsan Hyundai	2018	K League 1	26	0	1	0	—		7	0	—		34	0
Ulsan Hyundai	2019	K League 1	9	0	0	0	—		2	0	—		11	0
Ulsan Hyundai	Total		64	0	6	0	—		14	0	—		84	0
Gwangju FC	2020	K League 1	24	0	0	0	—		—		—		24	0
Incheon United	2021	K League 1	9	0	0	0	—		—		—		9	0
Incheon United	2022	K League 1	12	0	1	0	—		—		—		13	0
Incheon United	Total		21	0	1	0	—		—		—		22	0
Career total			336	8	24	0	31	0	38	1	2	0	431	9

== Honours ==
Jeonbuk Hyundai Motors

- AFC Champions League: 2016

Ulsan Hyundai

- Korean FA Cup: 2017

South Korea U23

- Summer Olympics bronze medal: 2012

South Korea

- AFC Asian Cup runner-up: 2015

Individual

- K League All-Star: 2009, 2010, 2012
- K League 1 Best XI: 2012
