= Hong Seong-yo =

South Korean footballer (born 1979)

Personal information
- Full name: Hong Seong-yo (홍성요)
- Date of birth: May 26, 1979 (age 47)
- Place of birth: South Korea
- Height: 1.85 m (6 ft 1 in)
- Position: Defender

Senior career*
| Years | Team | Apps | (Gls) |
| 2002–2007 | Chunnam Dragons | 16 | (0) |
| 2005–2006 | → Gwangju Sangmu (army) | 17 | (0) |
| 2008–2011 | Busan I'Park | 45 | (2) |
- * Club domestic league appearances and goals as of 25 July 2011

Hong Seong-yo (Korean: 홍성요; born May 26, 1979) is a South Korean football player. He played for Chunnam Dragons, Gwangju Sangmu and Busan I'Park formerly.
