= 2014 K League Classic =

32nd season of top-tier football league in South Korea

Hyundai Oilbank K League Classic
- Season: 2014
- Dates: 8 March – 30 November 2014
- Champions: Jeonbuk Hyundai Motors (3rd title)
- Relegated: Gyeongnam FC; Sangju Sangmu
- Champions League: Jeonbuk Hyundai Motors; Seongnam FC; Suwon Samsung Bluewings; FC Seoul
- Matches: 228
- Goals: 503 (2.21 per match)
- Best Player: Lee Dong-gook
- Top goalscorer: Júnior Santos (14 goals)
- Biggest home win: Jeonbuk 6–0 Sangju (20 July 2014)
- Biggest away win: Gyeongnam 1–4 Jeonbuk (13 July 2014)
- Highest scoring: Jeju 6–2 Jeonnam (6 September 2014)
- Longest winning run: 9 matches Jeonbuk Hyundai Motors
- Longest unbeaten run: 15 matches Jeonbuk Hyundai Motors
- Longest winless run: 16 matches Gyeongnam FC
- Longest losing run: 4 matches Gyeongnam FC; Jeonnam Dragons
- Highest attendance: 46,549; Seoul 2–0 Suwon (12 July 2014)
- Lowest attendance: 858; Jeonnam 1–1 Seongnam (1 November 2014)
- Average attendance: 7,932

The 2014 K League Classic was the 32nd season of the top division of South Korean professional football, and the second season of the K League Classic.

== Teams ==
Locations of the 2014 K League Classic clubs

=== General information ===
Club	City/Province	Manager	Owner(s)	Other sponsor(s)
Busan IPark	Busan	(South Korea) Yoon Sung-hyo	HDC Hyundai Development Company	
Gyeongnam FC	Gyeongnam	(Serbia) Branko Babić (caretaker)	Gyeongnam Provincial Government	DSME; Gyeongnam Bank
Incheon United	Incheon	(South Korea) Kim Bong-gil	Incheon Government	Shinhan Bank; Incheon International Airport
Jeju United	Jeju	(South Korea) Park Kyung-hoon	SK Energy	
Jeonbuk Hyundai Motors	Jeonbuk	(South Korea) Choi Kang-hee	Hyundai Motor Company	
Jeonnam Dragons	Jeonnam	(South Korea) Ha Seok-ju	POSCO	
Pohang Steelers	Pohang, Gyeongbuk	(South Korea) Hwang Sun-hong	POSCO	
Sangju Sangmu	Sangju, Gyeongbuk	(South Korea) Park Hang-seo	Korea Armed Forces Athletic Corps	
Seongnam FC	Seongnam, Gyeonggi	(South Korea) Lee Sang-yoon (caretaker)	Seongnam Government	
FC Seoul	Seoul	(South Korea) Choi Yong-soo	GS Group	
Suwon Samsung Bluewings	Suwon, Gyeonggi	(South Korea) Seo Jung-won	Cheil Worldwide	Samsung Electronics
Ulsan Hyundai	Ulsan	(South Korea) Cho Min-kook	Hyundai Heavy Industries	

=== Stadiums ===
Busan IPark	Gyeongnam FC	Incheon United	Jeju United	Jeonbuk Hyundai Motors	Jeonnam Dragons
Busan Asiad Stadium	Changwon Football Center	Incheon Football Stadium	Jeju World Cup Stadium	Jeonju World Cup Stadium	Gwangyang Football Stadium
Capacity: **53,864**	Capacity: **15,116**	Capacity: **20,891**	Capacity: **35,657**	Capacity: **42,477**	Capacity: **20,009**
Pohang Steelers	Sangju Sangmu	Seongnam FC	FC Seoul	Suwon Samsung Bluewings	Ulsan Hyundai
Pohang Steel Yard	Sangju Civic Stadium	Tancheon Stadium	Seoul World Cup Stadium	Suwon World Cup Stadium	Ulsan Munsu Football Stadium
Capacity: **25,000**	Capacity: **15,042**	Capacity: **16,250**	Capacity: **66,704**	Capacity: **43,959**	Capacity: **44,474**

=== Managerial changes ===
Team	Outgoing	Manner	Date	Incoming	Date	Table
Daegu FC	(South Korea) Baek Jong-chul	Resigned	30 November 2013	(South Korea) Choi Duck-joo	20 December 2013	Pre-season
Ulsan Hyundai	(South Korea) Kim Ho-kon	Resigned	4 December 2013	(South Korea) Cho Min-kook	6 December 2013	Pre-season
Gyeongnam FC	(Serbia) Ilija Petković	Sacked	11 December 2013	(South Korea) Lee Cha-man	17 December 2013	Pre-season
Seongnam FC	(South Korea) An Ik-soo	Resigned	20 December 2013	(South Korea) Park Jong-hwan	20 December 2013	Pre-season
Seongnam FC	(South Korea) Park Jong-hwan	Resigned	22 April 2014	(South Korea) Lee Sang-yoon (caretaker)	22 April 2014	8th
Gyeongnam FC	(South Korea) Lee Cha-man	Resigned	11 August 2014	(Serbia) Branko Babić (caretaker)	14 August 2014	12th
Seongnam FC	(South Korea) Lee Sang-yoon (caretaker)	Sacked	26 August 2014	(South Korea) Lee Young-jin (caretaker)	26 August 2014	10th
Seongnam FC	(South Korea) Lee Young-jin (caretaker)	Caretaker	6 September 2014	(South Korea) Kim Hak-bum	6 September 2014	10th

=== Foreign players ===
Restricting the number of foreign players strictly to four per team, including a slot for a player from AFC countries. A team could use four foreign players on the field each game including a least one player from the AFC country. Players name in bold indicates the player is registered during the mid-season transfer window.

As of 1 August 2014

Club	Player 1	Player 2	Player 3	AFC player	Former player
Busan IPark	(Brazil) Fágner	(Brazil) Nilson	(Brazil) **Jacio**		(Serbia) Nikola Komazec
Gyeongnam FC	(Croatia) **Edin Junuzović**	(Serbia) Sreten Sretenović	(Serbia) Miloš Stojanović	(Australia) Luke DeVere	(Serbia) Miloš Bosančić
Incheon United	(Brazil) Ivo	(Brazil) **Diogo Acosta**			(Brazil) João Paulo (Montenegro) Stefan Nikolić (Australia) Nathan Burns
Jeju United	(Brazil) **Thiago Alagoano**	(Chile) Hugo Droguett		(Australia) Aleksandar Jovanović	(Bosnia and Herzegovina) Jovica Stokić (Colombia) Julián Estiven Vélez
Jeonbuk Hyundai Motors	(Brazil) Leonardo	(Brazil) Kaio	(Brazil) **Vinícius Reche**	(Australia) Alex Wilkinson	(Brazil) Marcos Aurélio
Jeonnam Dragons	(Brazil) Leandrinho	(Croatia) Sandi Križman	(North Macedonia) Stevica Ristić	(Australia) Robert Cornthwaite	
Pohang Steelers					
Seongnam FC	(Brazil) Valdivia	(Uzbekistan) Server Djeparov			(Australia) Brendan Hamill (Montenegro) Ivan Vuković
FC Seoul	(Brazil) **Éverton Santos**	(Colombia) Mauricio Molina	(Spain) Osmar	(Japan) Sergio Escudero	(Brazil) Rafael Costa
Suwon Samsung Bluewings	(Brazil) Júnior Santos	(Brazil) Roger	(Brazil) Reiner Ferreira	(North Korea) Jong Tae-se (Note: Jong Tae-se represented North Korea at international level, but he was deemed as a native player in the K League by South Korean law and passport.)	
Ulsan Hyundai	(Brazil) **Wander Luiz**	(Brazil) **Tartá**	(Montenegro) **Filip Kasalica**		(Brazil) Caíque (Brazil) Rafinha (Brazil) Almir

== League table ==
Pos	Team	Pld	W	D	L	GF	GA	GD	Pts	Qualification or relegation
1	Jeonbuk Hyundai Motors (C)	38	24	9	5	60	22	+38	81	Qualification for Champions League group stage
2	Suwon Samsung Bluewings	38	19	10	9	52	37	+15	67	Qualification for Champions League group stage
3	FC Seoul	38	15	13	10	42	28	+14	58	Qualification for Champions League play-off round
4	Pohang Steelers	38	16	10	12	50	39	+11	58	
5	Jeju United	38	14	12	12	39	36	+3	54	
6	Ulsan Hyundai	38	13	11	14	44	43	+1	50	
7	Jeonnam Dragons	38	14	9	15	48	53	−5	51	
8	Busan IPark	38	10	13	15	37	49	−12	43	
9	Seongnam FC	38	9	13	16	32	39	−7	40	Qualification for Champions League group stage (Note: Qualified as champions of FA Cup.)
10	Incheon United	38	8	16	14	33	46	−13	40	
11	Gyeongnam FC (R)	38	7	15	16	30	52	−22	36	Qualification for relegation play-offs
12	Sangju Sangmu (R)	38	7	13	18	39	62	−23	34	Relegation to K League Challenge

Source: RSSSF
Rules for classification: 1) Points; 2) Goal difference; 3) Goals scored
(C) Champions; (R) Relegated

== Positions by matchday ==
Leaders
Qualification for Champions League
Qualification for relegation play-offs
Relegation to K League Challenge

=== Round 1–33 ===
Team ╲ Round	1	2	3	4	5	6	7	8	9	10	11	12	13	14	15	16	17	18	19	20	21	22	23	24	25	26	27	28	29	30	31	32	33
Jeonbuk Hyundai Motors	1	1	2	3	2	2	5	4	2	2	2	2	2	2	2	2	2	1	1	1	1	1	1	1	1	1	1	1	1	1	1	1	1
Suwon Samsung Bluewings	2	3	6	11	5	6	6	2	4	6	5	6	6	4	5	5	5	3	3	3	3	3	3	3	3	3	3	3	3	2	2	2	2
Pohang Steelers	8	12	8	5	4	4	2	1	1	1	1	1	1	1	1	1	1	2	2	2	2	2	2	2	2	2	2	2	2	3	3	3	3
FC Seoul	8	10	10	9	9	9	11	11	11	10	11	9	9	9	7	7	7	7	7	7	7	7	7	7	6	5	5	5	5	5	5	5	4
Jeju United	8	4	4	6	7	5	3	6	3	3	4	3	3	5	4	4	3	4	4	4	4	5	5	4	4	4	4	4	4	4	4	4	5
Ulsan Hyundai	2	1	1	1	1	1	1	5	5	5	6	5	5	6	6	6	6	6	6	5	6	6	6	6	7	6	7	7	7	7	7	6	6
Jeonnam Dragons	2	4	3	2	3	3	4	3	6	4	3	4	4	3	3	3	4	5	5	6	5	4	4	5	5	7	6	6	6	6	6	7	7
Incheon United	6	9	12	12	12	12	12	12	12	12	12	12	12	12	12	12	12	11	10	9	9	8	8	8	8	8	8	8	8	8	8	8	8
Busan IPark	12	6	5	4	5	7	7	7	7	7	7	7	10	10	10	10	10	10	11	11	10	11	12	11	11	11	12	12	12	12	11	9	9
Seongnam FC	8	10	10	9	10	10	8	9	9	11	8	8	8	8	9	9	8	8	9	10	11	10	10	9	9	10	10	10	9	10	9	10	10
Sangju Sangmu	6	8	7	8	11	11	10	10	10	8	9	11	7	7	8	8	9	9	8	8	8	9	9	10	10	9	9	9	11	11	10	11	11
Gyeongnam FC	2	7	9	7	8	8	9	8	8	9	10	10	11	11	11	11	11	12	12	12	12	12	11	12	12	12	11	11	10	10	12	12	12

Source: K League

=== Round 34–38 ===
Team ╲ Round	34	35	36	37	38
Jeonbuk Hyundai Motors	1	1	1	1	1
Suwon Samsung Bluewings	2	2	2	2	2
FC Seoul	5	4	4	4	3
Pohang Steelers	3	3	3	3	4
Jeju United	4	5	5	5	5
Ulsan Hyundai	6	6	6	6	6
Jeonnam Dragons	7	7	7	7	7
Busan IPark	9	8	8	8	8
Seongnam FC	10	11	11	10	9
Incheon United	8	9	9	9	10
Gyeongnam FC	11	10	10	11	11
Sangju Sangmu	12	12	12	12	12

Source: K League

== Results ==
=== Matches 1–22 ===
Teams play each other twice, once at home, once away.

Home \ Away	BIP	GNM	ICU	JJU	JHM	JND	PHS	SJS	SEN	SEO	SSB	USH
Busan IPark	—	2–2	2–2	1–1	0–2	0–1	3–1	1–1	1–0	0–2	0–2	0–0
Gyeongnam FC	1–1	—	1–0	1–1	1–4	2–3	0–0	0–0	1–0	1–1	2–2	0–1
Incheon United	0–0	2–0	—	0–0	0–1	0–0	0–0	1–2	1–1	1–0	0–3	2–0
Jeju United	2–1	1–1	1–0	—	2–0	2–0	0–0	2–3	1–0	1–1	0–1	1–0
Jeonbuk Hyundai Motors	3–0	4–1	1–1	1–1	—	2–0	1–3	6–0	1–0	1–2	3–2	1–0
Jeonnam Dragons	2–1	3–1	1–2	1–2	0–2	—	2–2	4–3	2–0	2–2	3–1	1–0
Pohang Steelers	2–0	3–0	3–0	3–0	0–2	3–1	—	4–2	1–0	0–0	2–1	0–1
Sangju Sangmu	2–0	1–3	2–2	0–1	0–0	1–2	0–2	—	1–1	2–1	1–1	1–1
Seongnam FC	2–4	1–0	0–0	1–2	0–3	0–1	3–1	0–0	—	0–0	2–0	1–1
FC Seoul	0–1	0–0	5–1	2–0	1–1	0–1	0–1	2–1	1–0	—	2–0	0–1
Suwon Samsung Bluewings	1–0	0–0	3–2	1–0	1–0	1–0	4–1	2–2	1–1	0–1	—	3–2
Ulsan Hyundai	3–0	3–0	3–0	1–1	0–0	1–0	0–2	3–0	0–1	2–1	2–2	—

Source: K League
Legend: Blue = home team win; Yellow = draw; Red = away team win.

=== Matches 23–33 ===
Teams play every other team once (either at home or away).

Home \ Away	BIP	GNM	ICU	JJU	JHM	JND	PHS	SJS	SEN	SEO	SSB	USH
Busan IPark	—	4–0	—	2–1	1–1	—	—	1–1	1–0	—	—	1–3
Gyeongnam FC	—	—	—	—	2–1	1–0	0–2	—	0–1	—	—	—
Incheon United	3–0	—	—	—	0–2	3–3	2–1	1–0	—	—	—	—
Jeju United	—	—	0–2	—	—	6–2	3–0	—	—	—	0–0	1–0
Jeonbuk Hyundai Motors	—	1–0	—	2–0	—	—	—	2–0	—	0–0	1–0	1–0
Jeonnam Dragons	2–1	0–0	—	—	2–1	—	0–1	—	—	1–2	—	1–1
Pohang Steelers	0–0	—	—	—	2–2	—	—	3–0	1–0	0–1	—	—
Sangju Sangmu	—	—	—	1–2	—	1–0	—	—	1–1	1–0	0–1	—
Seongnam FC	—	—	2–0	1–1	0–1	1–0	—	—	—	1–2	—	3–4
FC Seoul	1–1	1–1	3–1	0–0	—	—	—	—	—	—	0–1	—
Suwon Samsung Bluewings	1–1	—	1–1	—	—	2–1	2–1	—	2–2	—	—	2–0
Ulsan Hyundai	—	2–1	1–1	—	—	—	1–2	2–1	—	0–3	—	—

Source: K League
Legend: Blue = home team win; Yellow = draw; Red = away team win.

=== Matches 34–38 ===
After 33 matches, the league splits into two sections of six teams each, with teams playing every other team in their section once (either at home or away). The exact matches are determined upon the league table at the time of the split.

==== Group A ====
Home \ Away	JJU	JHM	PHS	SEO	SSB	USH
Jeju United	—	0–3	—	1–2	0–1	—
Jeonbuk Hyundai Motors	—	—	1–0	—	—	1–1
Pohang Steelers	1–1	—	—	—	1–2	2–2
FC Seoul	—	0–1	0–0	—	—	2–2
Suwon Samsung Bluewings	—	1–2	—	0–1	—	—
Ulsan Hyundai	0–1	—	—	—	0–3	—

Source: K League
Legend: Blue = home team win; Yellow = draw; Red = away team win.

==== Group B ====
Home \ Away	BIP	GNM	ICU	JND	SJS	SEN
Busan IPark	—	—	1–0	1–1	—	—
Gyeongnam FC	0–1	—	—	3–1	—	—
Incheon United	—	1–1	—	—	1–1	0–1
Jeonnam Dragons	—	—	0–0	—	3–1	1–1
Sangju Sangmu	2–3	3–1	—	—	—	1–1
Seongnam FC	1–0	1–1	—	—	—	—

Source: K League
Legend: Blue = home team win; Yellow = draw; Red = away team win.

== Relegation play-offs ==
The promotion-relegation play-offs were held between the winners of the 2014 K League Challenge play-offs and the 11th-placed club of the 2014 K League Classic. The winners on aggregate score after both matches earned entry into the 2015 K League Classic.

3 December 2014
19:00

Gwangju FC	3–1	Gyeongnam FC
Cho Yong-tae 20'; Diego Silva 48'; Sretenović 85' (o.g.)	Report	Stojanović 32'

Gwangju World Cup Stadium, Gwangju
Attendance: 2,667

6 December 2014
14:00

Gyeongnam FC	1–1	Gwangju FC
Song Soo-young 70'	Report	Kim Ho-nam 75'

Changwon Football Center, Changwon
Attendance: 1,969

Gwangju FC won 4–2 on aggregate and were promoted to the K League Classic, while Gyeongnam FC were relegated to the K League Challenge.

== Player statistics ==
=== Top scorers ===
Rank	Player	Club	Goals
1	(Brazil) Júnior Santos	Suwon Samsung Bluewings	14
2	(South Korea) Lee Dong-gook	Jeonbuk Hyundai Motors	13
2	(North Macedonia) Stevica Ristić	Jeonnam Dragons	13
4	(South Korea) Han Kyo-won	Jeonbuk Hyundai Motors	11
4	(South Korea) Lim Sang-hyub	Busan IPark	11
6	(South Korea) Kim Seung-dae	Pohang Steelers	10
6	(South Korea) Lee Jong-ho	Jeonnam Dragons	10
6	(Brazil) Fágner	Busan IPark	10
6	(Chile) Hugo Droguett	Jeju United	10
10	(South Korea) Kim Shin-wook	Ulsan Hyundai	9
10	(South Korea) Yang Dong-hyun	Ulsan Hyundai	9
10	(Brazil) Kaio	Jeonbuk Hyundai Motors	9

=== Top assist providers ===
Rank	Players	Club	Assists
1	(South Korea) Lee Seung-gi	Jeonbuk Hyundai Motors	10
1	(Brazil) Leonardo	Jeonbuk Hyundai Motors	10
3	(South Korea) Lee Myung-joo	Pohang Steelers	9
4	(South Korea) Kim Seung-dae	Pohang Steelers	8
4	(South Korea) Yeom Ki-hun	Suwon Samsung Bluewings	8
6	(South Korea) Hyun Young-min	Jeonnam Dragons	7
6	(Brazil) Júnior Santos	Suwon Samsung Bluewings	7
8	(South Korea) Han Sang-woon	Sangju Sangmu	6
8	(South Korea) Ahn Yong-woo	Jeonnam Dragons	6
8	(South Korea) Lee Dong-gook	Jeonbuk Hyundai Motors	6
8	(Brazil) Ivo	Incheon United	6

== Awards ==
The 2014 K League Awards was held on 1 December 2014.

=== Main awards ===
Award	Winner	Club
Most Valuable Player	(South Korea) Lee Dong-gook	Jeonbuk Hyundai Motors
Top goalscorer	(Brazil) Júnior Santos	Suwon Samsung Bluewings
Top assist provider	(South Korea) Lee Seung-gi	Jeonbuk Hyundai Motors
Young Player of the Year	(South Korea) Kim Seung-dae	Pohang Steelers
FANtastic Player	(South Korea) Lee Dong-gook	Jeonbuk Hyundai Motors
Manager of the Year	(South Korea) Choi Kang-hee	Jeonbuk Hyundai Motors
Special Award	(South Korea) Kim Byung-ji	Jeonnam Dragons
Best Referee	(South Korea) Choi Myung-yong	—
Best Assistant Referee	(South Korea) Noh Tae-sik	—
Fair Play Award	FC Seoul	
Youth Team of the Year	Maetan Middle School (Suwon Samsung Bluewings)	

=== Best XI ===
Position	Winner	Club
Goalkeeper	(South Korea) Kwon Sun-tae	Jeonbuk Hyundai Motors
Defenders	(South Korea) Hong Chul	Suwon Samsung Bluewings
Defenders	(Australia) Alex Wilkinson	Jeonbuk Hyundai Motors
Defenders	(South Korea) Kim Ju-young	FC Seoul
Defenders	(South Korea) Cha Du-ri	FC Seoul
Midfielders	(South Korea) Lim Sang-hyub	Busan IPark
Midfielders	(South Korea) Koh Myong-jin	FC Seoul
Midfielders	(South Korea) Lee Seung-gi	Jeonbuk Hyundai Motors
Midfielders	(South Korea) Han Kyo-won	Jeonbuk Hyundai Motors
Forwards	(South Korea) Lee Dong-gook	Jeonbuk Hyundai Motors
Forwards	(Brazil) Júnior Santos	Suwon Samsung Bluewings

== Attendance ==
=== Attendance by club ===
Attendants who entered with free ticket are not counted.

Pos	Team	Total	High	Low	Average	Change
1	Suwon Samsung Bluewings	372,551	34,029	6,527	19,608	+10.8%
2	FC Seoul	323,244	46,549	4,336	17,013	+2.4%
3	Jeonbuk Hyundai Motors	250,134	30,597	6,142	13,165	+29.6%
4	Pohang Steelers	186,216	17,424	4,487	9,801	+1.0%
5	Ulsan Hyundai	126,572	16,216	2,016	7,032	−20.4%
6	Jeju United	127,520	17,484	1,125	6,712	+3.8%
7	Incheon United	86,815	11,238	2,086	4,569	−35.4%
8	Gyeongnam FC	86,285	10,943	1,554	4,541	−23.8%
9	Seongnam FC	71,344	8,624	1,282	3,755	+32.9%
10	Jeonnam Dragons	67,294	10,022	858	3,365	+47.7%
11	Busan IPark	61,819	7,008	1,134	3,254	−19.4%
12	Sangju Sangmu	48,606	6,469	867	2,558	−7.7%^{†}
	League total	1,808,400	46,549	858	7,932	+3.6%

Updated to games played on 30 November 2014
Source: K League
Notes:
^{†} Team played previous season in K League Challenge.

=== Top matches ===
Rank	Date	Home	Score	Away	Venue	Attendance	Round	Day of week
1	12 July 2014	FC Seoul	2–0	Suwon Samsung Bluewings	Seoul World Cup Stadium	46,549	15	Saturday
2	5 October 2014	FC Seoul	0–1	Suwon Samsung Bluewings	Seoul World Cup Stadium	41,297	30	Sunday
3	9 November 2014	Suwon Samsung Bluewings	0–1	FC Seoul	Suwon World Cup Stadium	34,029	35	Sunday
4	23 August 2014	Jeonbuk Hyundai Motors	1–2	FC Seoul	Jeonju World Cup Stadium	30,597	22	Saturday
5	27 April 2014	Suwon Samsung Bluewings	0–1	FC Seoul	Suwon World Cup Stadium	29,318	10	Sunday
6	24 August 2014	Suwon Samsung Bluewings	1–1	Seongnam FC	Suwon World Cup Stadium	27,558	22	Sunday
7	16 August 2014	FC Seoul	5–1	Incheon United	Seoul World Cup Stadium	24,027	21	Saturday
8	19 July 2014	Suwon Samsung Bluewings	3–2	Incheon United	Suwon World Cup Stadium	23,835	16	Saturday
9	30 March 2014	Suwon Samsung Bluewings	1–0	Busan IPark	Suwon World Cup Stadium	23,767	5	Sunday
10	3 May 2014	Suwon Samsung Bluewings	1–0	Jeonbuk Hyundai Motors	Suwon World Cup Stadium	23,466	11	Saturday

== See also ==
- 2014 in South Korean football
- 2014 K League Challenge
- 2014 Korean FA Cup
