= Park Jong-woo =

South Korean footballer (born 1989)

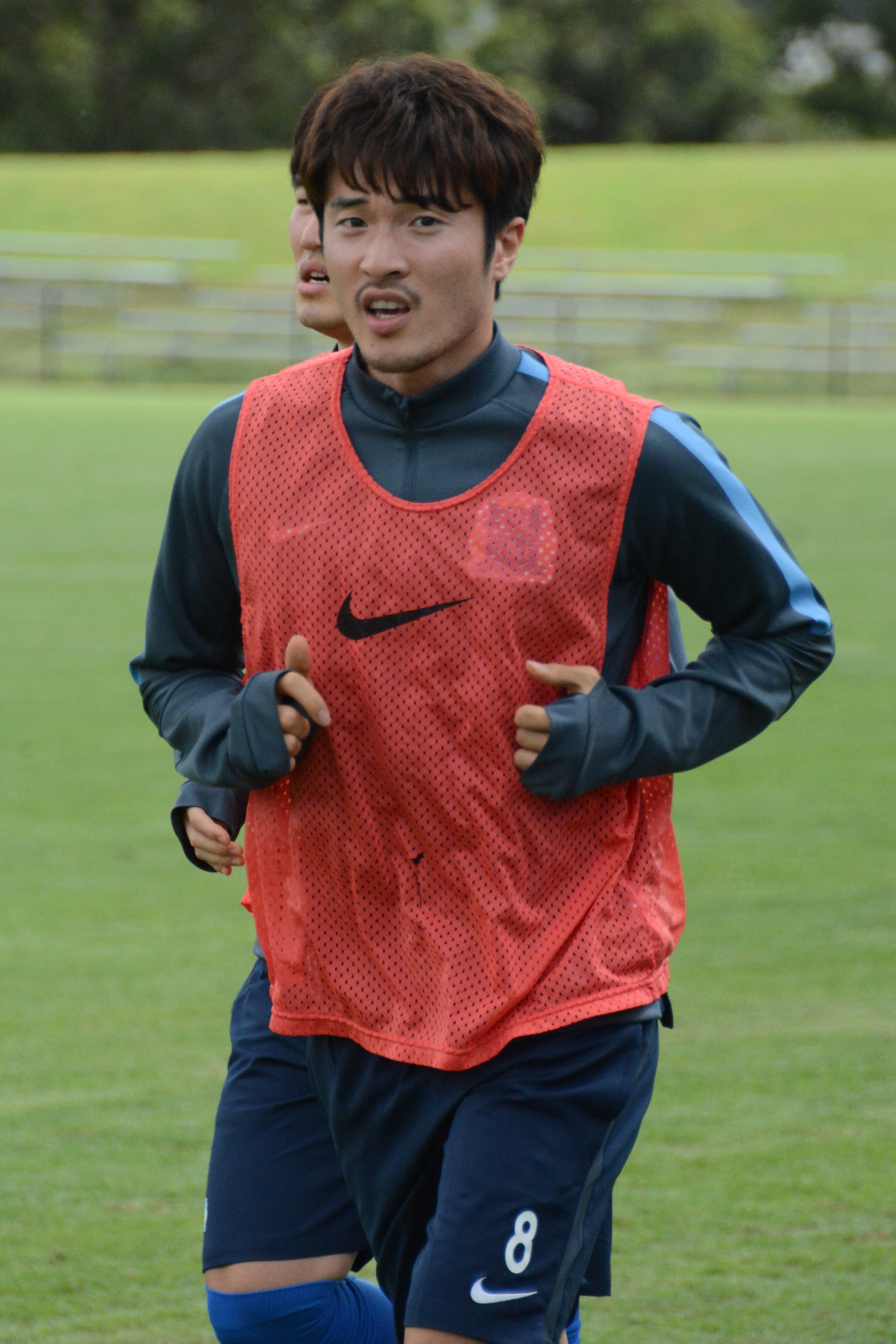

Personal information
- Date of birth: 10 March 1989 (age 37)
- Place of birth: Seongnam, Gyeonggi, South Korea
- Height: 1.80 m (5 ft 11 in)
- Position: Central midfielder

Youth career
- 2008–2009: Yonsei University

Senior career*
Years	Team	Apps	(Gls)
2010–2013	Busan IPark	96	(7)
2014–2015	Guangzhou R&F	34	(1)
2015–2017	Al Jazira	43	(1)
2017–2018	Emirates	21	(1)
2018	Suwon Samsung Bluewings	7	(0)
2019–2024	Busan IPark	90	(3)
2024–2025	Nongbua Pitchaya	22	(0)
Total		313	(13)

International career^{‡}
2007–2009	South Korea U20	7	(0)
2011–2012	South Korea U23	14	(1)
2012–2017	South Korea	15	(0)
Medal record
Olympic Games
Bronze medal – third place	2012 London	Team
- * Club domestic league appearances and goals as of 23 February 2025 ‡ National team caps and goals as of 10 October 2017

- Park Jong-woo
- Hangul: 박종우
- Hanja: 朴鍾佑
- RR: Bak Jongu
- MR: Pak Chongu

Park Jong-woo (Korean: 박종우; born 10 March 1989) is a South Korean former professional footballer who currently plays as a midfielder. He has previously played for the Chinese club Guangzhou R&F and also in the UAE Arabian Gulf League for Al Jazira and Emirates. He has represented South Korea at age group and senior level, including the Men's tournament at the 2012 Summer Olympics, and was part of the South Korean squad for 2014 FIFA World Cup in Brazil.

== Club career ==
Park joined Busan IPark from Yonsei University for the 2010 K-League season. Park's first appearance for his new club was in the K League 1, as a substitute in the 3–0 win over FC Seoul on 2 May 2010. Since his debut, Park has established himself as a Busan regular, making several appearances in both 2010 and 2011. Park scored his first professional goal in a drawn match with the Chunnam Dragons on 21 August 2011.

Park enjoyed a personally successful 2012 season, in which he became a key figure for Busan I'Park in central midfield. His performances ensured his inclusion in the South Korea squad for the London Olympics that summer.

Park continued his good form into 2013. On the opening day of the K League 1 season, during a 2–2 draw with Gangwon, he assisted Lim Sang-hyub's opening goal, and later converted a penalty. On 7 August, Park scored the deciding goal, also from the penalty spot, in the 2–1 victory over FC Seoul in the quarter-final of the FA Cup, taking Busan into the semi-finals. Park was included in the official K League 1 Team of the Week on six occasions during the 2013 season.

On 13 February 2014, Park transferred to Chinese Super League side Guangzhou R&F. After a year and a half with the Chinese club, Park transferred to Al Jazira on 6 July 2015, on a three-year contract. He was a regular member of the team that were crowned champions of the 2016/17 Arabian Gulf League.

After one season with Emirates Club in the UAE Arabian Gulf League, Park transferred to Korean side Suwon Bluewings for the second half of the 2018 Korean season.

On 12 January 2019 Park signed for Busan IPark, the club at which he began his professional career. Park was named Busan vice-captain for the 2019 season and was a regular starter as the club finished second in the league and achieved promotion to the K League 1. He contributed seven assists and was shortlisted for the K League 2 Bext XI. Park was named club captain for the 2021 season.

== International career ==
Park was included in the South Korean squad for the 2012 London Olympics. He started all three group games as South Korea finished second in their group and advanced to the next round. In the quarter-final match with Great Britain, Park played the entire 120 minutes as the game went to a penalty shoot-out. Park scored the fourth penalty for Korea, who won the shoot-out 5–4. Park was an unused substitute in the semi-final defeat to Brazil, but returned to the starting line-up for the third place play-off victory over Japan, which ensured Korea were bronze medal winners.

After impressing as a midfield partner for Ki Sung-yueng at the Olympic Games, Park made his full international debut on 17 October 2012 in a World Cup qualifying defeat to Iran. He represented Korea in the 2013 East Asian Cup, and was also part of the squad for the 2014 FIFA World Cup in Brazil. He was an unused substitute in all three group games as Korea were eliminated at the group stage.

Park returned to the national team squad after a three-year absence for the friendly games against Russia and Morocco in October 2017.

== London Olympics controversy ==
Although the International Olympic Committee prohibits players from making political statements, following South Korea's victory of Japan in the bronze medal match of the men's football, Park displayed the sign with a slogan of justification for Korea's occupation of the Liancourt Rocks, known as Dokdo or Tokto (독도, literally) in Korean, or Takeshima (たけしま/竹島) in Japanese. As a consequence he was banned from the medal ceremony and unlike his other 17 teammates he did not receive a bronze medal for his performance. It was also announced that he was under investigation by the International Olympic Committee and football's governing body FIFA, both of which have rules that prohibit political statements by athletes on the field.

South Korea exempts Olympic medalists from military service. Despite Park not receiving a medal due to his political statement South Korean sports minister Choe Kwang-shik stated that regardless of what the IOC investigation decides Park will still not be required to do the two years of military service that South Korean men are required to do. FIFA failed to reach a conclusion on the case at a meeting at its Zurich headquarters held on 5 October, and the disciplinary committee discussed the case again on the following week, then failed to reach a verdict again.

After that, the Korean Olympic Committee (KOC) announced that Park would receive his bronze medal.

However, the case was heard again by the committee on 20 November, and FIFA finally decided and announced on 3 December to suspend Park for two matches after he was considered to have breached the FIFA Disciplinary Code and the Regulations of the Olympic Football Tournaments. FIFA also impose a warning on the Korea Football Association and reminded it of its obligation to properly instruct its players on all the pertinent rules and applicable regulations before the start of any competition, in order to avoid such incident in the future. The Korea Football Association was warned that should incidents of such nature occur again in the future, the FIFA Disciplinary Committee may impose harsher sanctions on the Korea Football Association.

On 11 February 2013, Park attended an International Olympic Committee disciplinary hearing at Lausanne, Switzerland. After the Disciplinary Commission reviewed Park's action at the Olympics, the IOC decided to give the player the medal he had been barred from collecting for several months. Park was subsequently awarded his Olympic bronze medal, following a ruling by the International Olympic Committee over his celebration at the London Olympic Games.

== Career statistics ==
=== Club ===
Appearances and goals by club, season and competition
Club	Season	League			Cup		League Cup		Continental		Other		Total	
Club	Season	Division	Apps	Goals	Apps	Goals	Apps	Goals	Apps	Goals	Apps	Goals	Apps	Goals
Busan IPark	2010	K League 1	12	0	0	0	1	0	—		—		13	0
Busan IPark	2011	K League 1	25	2	2	0	5	0	—		—		32	2
Busan IPark	2012	K League 1	28	3	0	0	—		—		—		28	3
Busan IPark	2013	K League 1	31	2	3	1	—		—		—		34	3
Busan IPark	Total		96	7	5	1	6	0	—		—		107	8
Guangzhou R&F	2014	Chinese Super League	23	1	1	0	—		—		—		24	1
Guangzhou R&F	2015	Chinese Super League	11	0	0	0	—		6	0	—		17	0
Guangzhou R&F	Total		34	1	1	0	—		6	0	—		41	1
Al Jazira Club	2015–16	UAE Pro League	23	1	1	0	5	0	7	0	1	0	37	1
Al Jazira Club	2016–17	UAE Pro League	20	0	2	0	5	0	4	0	—		31	0
Al Jazira Club	Total		43	1	3	0	10	0	11	0	1	0	68	1
Emirates	2017–18	UAE Pro League	21	1	1	0	3	0	—		—		25	1
Suwon Samsung Bluewings	2018	K League 1	7	0	2	0	—		2	0	—		11	0
Busan IPark	2019	K League 2	33	2	0	0	—		—		—		33	2
Busan IPark	2020	K League 1	19	1	2	1	—		—		—		21	2
Busan IPark	2021	K League 2	6	0	0	0	—		—		—		6	0
Busan IPark	2022	K League 2	29	0	1	0	—		—		—		30	0
Busan IPark	2023	K League 2	3	0	1	0	—		—		—		4	0
Busan IPark	Total		90	3	4	1	—		—		—		94	4
Nongbua Pitchaya	2024–25	Thai League 1	22	0	0	0	1	0	—		—		23	0
Total			313	13	16	2	20	0	19	0	1	0	369	15
