= Kim Jae-hyun (footballer) =

South Korean footballer

Personal information
- Date of birth: March 9, 1987 (age 39)
- Place of birth: Gwangyang, Jeonnam, South Korea
- Height: 1.83 m (6 ft 0 in)
- Position: Defender

Team information
- Current team: Gyeongju KHNP

Senior career*
Years	Team	Apps	(Gls)
2007–2009	Chunnam Dragons	12	(1)
2010–2011	Busan I'Park	33	(3)
2013–2014	Busan IPark	13	(0)
2016	Busan IPark	21	(1)
2017–2018	Seoul E-Land	36	(2)
2019–	Gyeongju KHNP	0	(0)

International career
2005	South Korea U20	2	(1)
- * Club domestic league appearances and goals as of 5 January 2019

Kim Jae-hyun (Korean: 김재현; Hanja: 金渽玹; born March 9, 1987) is a South Korean football player who plays for Gyeongju KHNP as a central defender. He changed his name from Kim Eung-jin (김응진) in 2015.

== Club career statistics ==
Club performance			League		Cup		League Cup		Continental		Total	
Season	Club	League	Apps	Goals	Apps	Goals	Apps	Goals	Apps	Goals	Apps	Goals
South Korea			League		KFA Cup		League Cup		Asia		Total	
2007	Chunnam Dragons	K-League	1	0	0	0	0	0	0	0	1	0
2008	Chunnam Dragons	K-League	4	0	0	0	0	0	4	0	8	0
2009	Chunnam Dragons	K-League	7	1	3	0	1	0	—		11	1
2010	Busan I'Park	K-League	21	2	4	0	5	0	—		30	2
2011	Busan I'Park	K-League	12	1	1	0	5	0	—		18	1
2013	Busan I'Park	KL Classic	8	0	0	0	—	—	—	—	8	0
2014	Busan I'Park	KL Classic	5	0	0	0	—	—	—	—	5	0
2016	Busan I'Park	KL Challenge	21	1	2	0	0	0	—	—	23	1
Career total			79	5	10	0	11	0	4	0	104	5
