= Park Hee-do =

South Korean footballer (born 1986)

Personal information
- Date of birth: March 20, 1986 (age 40)
- Place of birth: Republic of Korea
- Height: 1.83 m (6 ft 0 in)
- Position: Midfielder

Youth career
- 2002–2004: Moonil High school
- 2005–2006: Dongguk University

Senior career*
Years	Team	Apps	(Gls)
2007–2011	Busan I'Park	71	(14)
2012	FC Seoul	17	(1)
2013–2015	Jeonbuk Hyundai Motors	34	(3)
2014–2015	→ Ansan Police (army)	21	(4)
2016	Al-Khor	4	(1)
2016 (Retired professionally)	Gangwon FC	12	(0)
2018-	FC Seocho Hurricanes		
- * Club domestic league appearances and goals as of 1 November 2016

- Park Hee-do
- Hangul: 박희도
- RR: Bak Huido
- MR: Pak Hŭido

Park Hee-do (Korean: 박희도; born 20 March 1986) is a South Korea football player who retired after playing for Gangwon FC.
