= Yoo Ho-joon =

South Korean footballer (born 1985)

Personal information
- Date of birth: January 14, 1985 (age 41)
- Place of birth: South Korea
- Height: 1.83 m (6 ft 0 in)
- Position: Midfielder

Team information
- Current team: Gyeongnam FC
- Number: 34

Youth career
- 2000–2002: Shinpyeong High School
- 2003–2006: Kwangwoon University

Senior career*
| Years | Team | Apps | (Gls) |
| 2007–2009 | Ulsan Hyundai | 26 | (1) |
| 2010–2011 | Busan I'Park | 37 | (4) |
| 2012– | Gyeongnam FC | 23 | (0) |
| 2014–2015 | → Ansan Police (army) | 23 | (0) |
- * Club domestic league appearances and goals as of 20 December 2015

- Yoo Ho-joon
- Hangul: 유호준
- Hanja: 柳好俊
- RR: Yu Hojun
- MR: Yu Hojun

Yoo Ho-joon (born January 14, 1985) is a South Korean football player who currently plays for Gyeongnam FC.
