= Lee Bum-young =

South Korean footballer (born 1989)

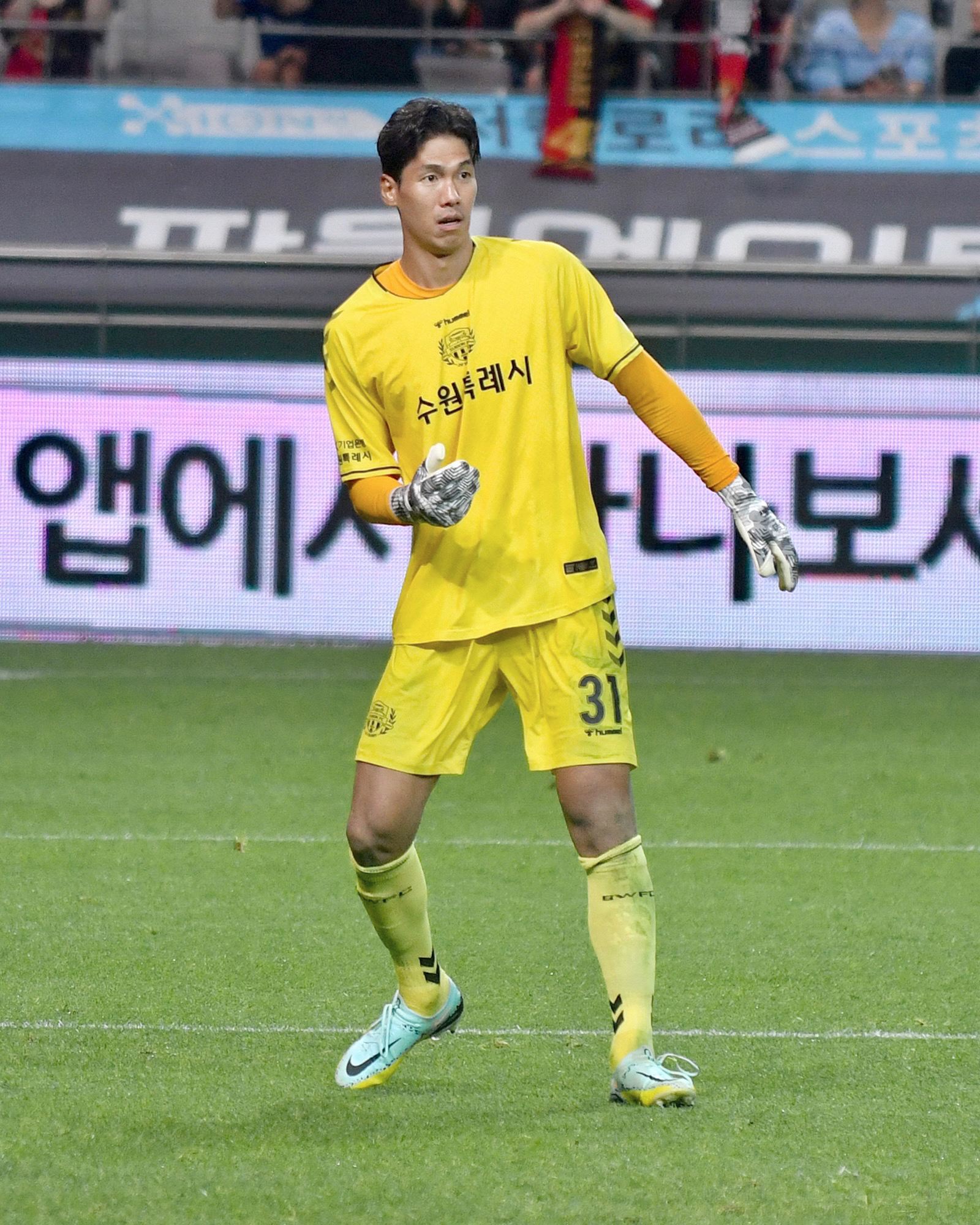
- Lee with Suwon FC in 2023

Personal information
- Full name: Lee Bum-young
- Date of birth: 2 April 1989 (age 37)
- Place of birth: Seoul, South Korea
- Height: 1.97 m (6 ft 5 1/2 in)
- Position: Goalkeeper

Senior career*
Years	Team	Apps	(Gls)
2008–2015	Busan IPark	134	(0)
2016	Avispa Fukuoka	25	(0)
2017–2018	Gangwon FC	66	(0)
2019–2021	Jeonbuk Hyundai Motors	1	(0)
2022–2023	Suwon FC	5	(0)
Total		231	(0)

International career^{‡}
2009	South Korea U20	3	(0)
2010–2012	South Korea U23	13	(0)
2014	South Korea	1	(0)
Medal record
Representing South Korea
Men's football
Olympic Games
Bronze medal – third place	2012 London
Asian Games
Bronze medal – third place	2010 Guangzhou
EAFF Championship
Winner	2015 China
- * Club domestic league appearances and goals as of 26 December 2021 ‡ National team caps and goals as of 14 January 2011

- Lee Bum-young
- Hangul: 이범영
- Hanja: 李範永
- RR: I Beomyeong
- MR: I Pŏmyŏng

Lee Bum-young (Korean: 이범영; born 2 April 1989) is a South Korean former footballer who played as a goalkeeper.

== Club career ==
Lee signed a professional contract for Busan IPark in 2008, and played as the second-choice goalkeeper for Busan during his early career. He became Busan's first-choice goalkeeper in 2013, but he transferred to J1 League club Avispa Fukuoka after Busan was relegated to the K League 2 in 2015.

== International career ==
Lee was selected as a reserve goalkeeper for the South Korean under-23 team for the 2012 Summer Olympics, and got opportunities after main goalkeeper Jung Sung-ryong was injured in the middle of the quarter-final match against Great Britain. He saved Daniel Sturridge's penalty in the penalty shoot-out of the quarter-final match, helping South Korea reach the semi-finals. He played as a starter for the first time in the next match against Brazil after his contribution. However, he conceded three goals to Brazil, losing the semi-final match. He did not play in the subsequent bronze medal match.

Lee was included in South Korea's squad for the 2014 FIFA World Cup, but did not play. He made his senior international debut against Uruguay on 8 September 2014.

== Personal life ==
Lee's younger brother Lee Bum-soo is also a goalkeeper.

Lee played as a goalkeeper for South Korea in the 2025 Kings World Cup Nations, an international seven-a-side football tournament.

== Career statistics ==
=== Club ===
Appearances and goals by club, season and competition
Club	Season	League			National cup		League cup		Continental		Other		Total	
Club	Season	Division	Apps	Goals	Apps	Goals	Apps	Goals	Apps	Goals	Apps	Goals	Apps	Goals
Busan IPark	2008	K League	10	0	1	0	6	0	—		—		17	0
Busan IPark	2009	K League	3	0	1	0	3	0	—		—		7	0
Busan IPark	2010	K League	6	0	2	0	0	0	—		—		8	0
Busan IPark	2011	K League	14	0	2	0	4	0	—		—		20	0
Busan IPark	2012	K League	12	0	1	0	—		—		—		13	0
Busan IPark	2013	K League 1	31	0	3	0	—		—		—		34	0
Busan IPark	2014	K League 1	31	0	3	0	—		—		—		34	0
Busan IPark	2015	K League 1	27	0	1	0	—		—		2 (Note: Appearances in K League promotion-relegation play-offs)	0	30	0
Busan IPark	Total		134	0	14	0	13	0	—		2	0	163	0
Avispa Fukuoka	2016	J1 League	25	0	1	0	4	0	—		—		30	0
Gangwon FC	2017	K League 1	36	0	2	0	—		—		—		38	0
Gangwon FC	2018	K League 1	30	0	0	0	—		—		—		30	0
Gangwon FC	Total		66	0	2	0	—		—		—		68	0
Jeonbuk Hyundai Motors	2020	K League 1	0	0	0	0	—		1	0	—		1	0
Jeonbuk Hyundai Motors	2021	K League 1	1	0	1	0	—		5	0	—		7	0
Jeonbuk Hyundai Motors	Total		1	0	1	0	—		6	0	—		8	0
Suwon FC	2022	K League 1	2	0	0	0	—		—		—		2	0
Suwon FC	2023	K League 1	3	0	0	0	—		—		—		3	0
Suwon FC	Total		5	0	0	0	—		—		—		5	0
Career total			231	0	18	0	17	0	6	0	2	0	274	0

== Honours ==
Busan IPark

- Korean FA Cup runner-up: 2010
- Korean League Cup runner-up: 2009, 2011

South Korea U23

- Summer Olympics bronze medal: 2012
- Asian Games bronze medal: 2010

South Korea

- EAFF Championship: 2015

Individual

- K League All-Star: 2014
