= Yang Dong-hyen =

South Korean footballer (born 1986)

Yang Dong-hyen 양동현
Personal information
- Full name: Yang Dong-hyen
- Date of birth: March 28, 1986 (age 40)
- Place of birth: Gwangyang, Jeonnam, South Korea
- Height: 1.88 m (6 ft 2 in)
- Position: Striker

Team information
- Current team: Suwon FC
- Number: 18

Youth career
- 2002–2003: Dongbuk High school
- 2002–2003: FC Metz (KFA Youth Project)
- 2003–2004: Real Valladolid

Senior career*
Years	Team	Apps	(Gls)
2005–2008	Ulsan Hyundai	28	(3)
2009–2013	Busan I'Park	95	(21)
2012–2013	→ Police (army)	21	(11)
2014–2015	Ulsan Hyundai	46	(13)
2016–2017	Pohang Steelers	68	(32)
2018–2019	Cerezo Osaka	16	(1)
2019	Avispa Fukuoka	32	(10)
2020	Seongnam FC	23	(3)
2021–2023	Suwon FC	38	(7)
Total		367	(101)

International career^{‡}
2003	South Korea U-20	1	(0)
2007–2008	South Korea U-23	7	(1)
2009	South Korea	2	(0)
- * Club domestic league appearances and goals as of 29 April 2023 ‡ National team caps and goals as of 17 June 2009

Yang Dong-hyen (Korean: 양동현) is a South Korean football player who plays for K League 1 club Suwon FC.

== Career ==
In the AFC U-17 Championship in 2002, he scored three goals. He scored in the semifinals against Uzbekistan U-17. And another goal was scored in the finals against Yemen U-17.

In the 2003 FIFA U-17 World Championship, he scored two goals in the group stage. He scored against Spain U-17, and the other against Sierra Leone U-17.

On June 3, 2009, he made his debut match at senior level game against Oman.

After completing his military service with K League 2 side Korean Police FC, Yang returned to his parent club Busan IPark in October 2013.

On 2 January 2020, Seongnam acquired Yang from J2 club Avispa Fukuoka.

== Career statistics ==
Appearances and goals by club, season and competition
Club	Season	League			Cup		League Cup		Continental		Other		Total	
Club	Season	Division	Apps	Goals	Apps	Goals	Apps	Goals	Apps	Goals	Apps	Goals	Apps	Goals
Ulsan Hyundai	2005	K League 1	0	0	2	0	0	0	—		—		2	0
Ulsan Hyundai	2006	K League 1	10	1	1	0	3	0	1	0	—		15	1
Ulsan Hyundai	2007	K League 1	7	2	1	0	9	4	—		—		17	6
Ulsan Hyundai	2008	K League 1	11	0	0	0	3	0	—		—		14	0
Ulsan Hyundai	Total		28	3	4	0	15	4	1	0	—		48	7
Busan I'Park	2009	K League 1	25	5	2	1	8	3	—		—		35	9
Busan I'Park	2010	K League 1	22	0	3	1	5	1	—		—		30	2
Busan I'Park	2011	K League 1	25	9	3	0	6	2	—		—		34	11
Busan I'Park	2013	K League 1	9	3	—		—		—		—		9	3
Busan I'Park	2014	K League 1	14	4	1	0	—		—		—		15	4
Busan I'Park	Total		95	21	9	2	19	6	—		—		123	29
Korean Police (army)	2012	R League			2	1	—		—		4	5	6	6
Korean Police (army)	2013	K League 2	21	11	1	1	—		—		—		22	12
Korean Police (army)	Total		21	11	3	2	—		—		4	5	28	18
Ulsan Hyundai	2014	K League 1	16	5	—		—		—		—		16	5
Ulsan Hyundai	2015	K League 1	30	8	3	1	—		—		—		33	9
Ulsan Hyundai	Total		46	13	3	1	—		—		—		49	14
Pohang Steelers	2016	K League 1	32	13	1	0	—		4	0	—		37	13
Pohang Steelers	2017	K League 1	36	19	1	0	—		—		—		37	19
Pohang Steelers	Total		68	32	2	0	—		4	0	—		74	32
Cerezo Osaka	2018	J1 League	16	1	2	0	2	0	5	1	1	0	26	2
Avispa Fukuoka	2019	J2 League	32	10	1	0	—		—		—		33	10
Seongnam FC	2020	K League 1	23	3	2	0	—		—		—		25	3
Suwon FC	2021	K League 1	29	7	1	1	—		—		—		30	8
Suwon FC	2022	K League 1	8	0	1	0	—		—		—		9	0
Suwon FC	2023	K League 1	1	0	0	0	—		—		0	0	1	0
Suwon FC	Total		38	7	2	1	—		—		0	0	40	8
Career total			367	101	28	6	36	10	10	1	5	5	446	123
