= Lim Sang-hyub =

South Korean footballer (born 1988)

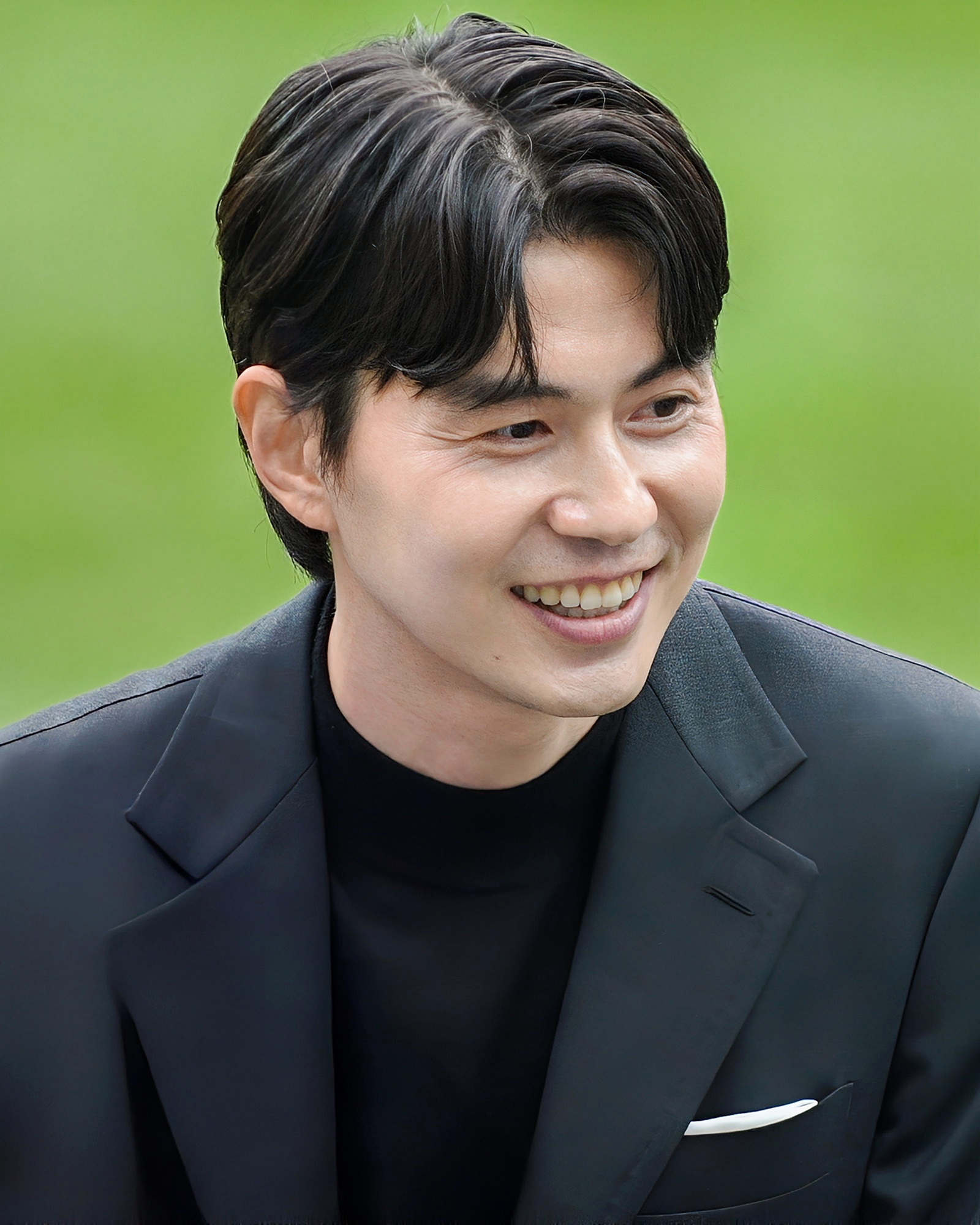
- Lim in 2025

Personal information
- Date of birth: 8 July 1988 (age 38)
- Place of birth: Seoul, South Korea
- Height: 1.80 m (5 ft 11 in)
- Position: Winger

Youth career
- 2007–2008: Ryutsu Keizai University

Senior career*
Years	Team	Apps	(Gls)
2009–2010	Jeonbuk Hyundai Motors	19	(1)
2011–2017	Busan IPark	176	(39)
2015–2016	→ Sangju Sangmu (army)	59	(20)
2018–2020	Suwon Samsung Bluewings	27	(2)
2019	→ Jeju United (loan)	4	(0)
2021-2022	Pohang Steelers	72	(19)
2023–2024	FC Seoul	52	(6)
Total		409	(87)

International career
2013	South Korea	1	(0)
- * Club domestic league appearances and goals

Lim Sang-hyub (Korean: 임상협; born 8 July 1988) is a South Korean former football player who played as a winger.

== Club career ==
Lim joined Busan IPark from Jeonbuk Motors before the 2011 season, and he quickly became a regular for the side. He started the 2013 K-League season in impressive form, netting five times in the opening ten league fixtures. On 4 August 2013, Lim scored a hat-trick in a 5–1 victory over Gyeongnam. He finished the season as IPark's top league scorer with nine goals. In the 2014 K League 1 season, Lim was once again the club's top scorer with eleven goals. He was also included in the league's 'Best Eleven' for the 2014 season.

Lim joined army side Sangju Sangmu for the 2015 season to complete his mandatory military service. He returned to Busan for the final stages of the 2016 season, and remained with the club in 2017 despite their failure to gain promotion to the K League 1. Lim signed for Suwon Bluewings at the start of the 2018 season, but joined Jeju United on loan in 2019 after struggling for game time.

For the 2023 season, on 22 December 2022, he joined FC Seoul.

Lim became a free agent at the end of the 2024 K League 1 season, but was unable to find a team. He announced his retirement from the sport in March 2025.

== International career ==
On 14 August 2013 Lim made his debut for the Korean national team in a 0–0 friendly draw against Peru. He appeared as a substitute, replacing Yun Il-Lok in the 57th minute.

== Career statistics ==
=== Club ===
Appearances and goals by club, season and competition
Club	Season	League			Cup		League Cup		Continental		Total	
Club	Season	Division	Apps	Goals	Apps	Goals	Apps	Goals	Apps	Goals	Apps	Goals
Jeonbuk Hyundai Motors|	2009	K League 1	13	1	1	0	4	0	1	1	19	2
Jeonbuk Hyundai Motors|	2010	K League 1	6	0	2	3	1	0	4	1	13	4
Jeonbuk Hyundai Motors|	Total		19	1	3	3	5	0	5	2	32	6
Busan IPark	2011	K League 1	28	9	2	0	6	1	—		36	10
Busan IPark	2012	K League 1	39	3	6	1	—		—		45	4
Busan IPark	2013	K League 1	36	9	4	1	—		—		40	10
Busan IPark	2014	K League 1	35	11	3	1	—		—		38	12
Busan IPark	2016	K League 2	8	1	0	0	—		—		8	1
Busan IPark	2017	K League 2	30	6	3	0	—		—		33	6
Busan IPark	Total		176	39	18	3	6	1	—		200	43
Sangju Sangmu (army)	2015	K League 2	34	12	0	0	—		—		34	12
Sangju Sangmu (army)	2016	K League 1	25	8	0	0	—		—		25	8
Sangju Sangmu (army)	Total		59	20	0	0	—		—		59	20
Suwon Samsung Bluewings	2018	K League 1	19	2	4	1	—		8	2	31	5
Suwon Samsung Bluewings	2019	K League 1	2	0	0	0	—		—		2	0
Suwon Samsung Bluewings	2020	K League 1	6	0	1	0	—		5	2	12	2
Suwon Samsung Bluewings	Total		27	2	5	0	—		13	4	45	7
Jeju United (loan)	2019	K League 1	4	0	—		—		—		4	0
Pohang Steelers	2021	K League 1	36	11	1	1	—		9	4	46	16
Pohang Steelers	2022	K League 1	36	8	3	0	—		—		39	8
Pohang Steelers	Total		72	19	4	1	—		9	4	85	24
FC Seoul	2023	K League 1	22	3	0	0	—		—		22	3
FC Seoul	2024	K League 1	30	3	2	0	—		—		32	3
FC Seoul	Total		52	6	2	0	—		—		54	6
Career total			409	87	32	8	11	1	27	10	479	106

=== International ===
No.	Date	Venue	Opponent	Score	Result	Competition
1.	30 January 2018	Suwon World Cup Stadium, Suwon, South Korea	(Vietnam) Thanh Hóa	2–0	5–1	2018 AFC Champions League

== Honours ==
Individual

- K League 1 Best XI (2): 2014, 2021
- AFC Champions League(1):Second place
