= Han Sang-woon =

South Korean footballer

Han Sang-Woon 한상운
Personal information
- Full name: Han Sang-Woon
- Date of birth: 30 May 1986 (age 40)
- Place of birth: Taebaek, South Korea
- Height: 1.82 m (5 ft 11 1/2 in)
- Positions: Winger; attacking midfielder; forward

Youth career
- 2005–2008: Dankook University

Senior career*
Years	Team	Apps	(Gls)
2009–2011	Busan I'Park	76	(16)
2012	Seongnam Ilhwa Chunma	16	(1)
2012	Júbilo Iwata	5	(0)
2013–2017	Ulsan Hyundai	96	(12)
2014–2015	→ Sangju Sangmu (army)	46	(7)
2018	Suwon FC	11	(0)
2019–2020	Busan IPark	5	(0)
2020	→ Gangneung Citizen FC (loan)	20	(3)
2021	Busan Transportation Corporation FC	24	(8)

International career^{‡}
2011–	South Korea	2	(0)
- * Club domestic league appearances and goals as of 8 March 2022 ‡ National team caps and goals as of 29 February 2012

- Han Sang-woon
- Hangul: 한상운
- Hanja: 韓相云
- RR: Han Sangun
- MR: Han Sangun

Han Sang-Woon (Korean: 한상운; born 30 May 1986) is a retired South Korean football forward.

== Career ==
He joined Busan I'Park by 2009 K-League draft. He scored 2 goals in 23 appearances in his first season. In the 2011 season, he showed better performance than his previous seasons and made many impressive goals. He scored 9 goals and had 7 assists at 28 appearances in this season.

On 30 December 2011, he moved to Seongnam Ilhwa Chunma from his first professional club Busan.

== Club statistics ==
As of 30 June 2012

Club performance			League		Cup		League Cup		Continental		Total	
Season	Club	League	Apps	Goals	Apps	Goals	Apps	Goals	Apps	Goals	Apps	Goals
South Korea			League		KFA Cup		League Cup		Asia		Total	
2009	Busan I'Park	K-League	23	2	1	0	8	1	-		32	3
2010	Busan I'Park	K-League	26	5	5	4	5	2	-		36	11
2011	Busan I'Park	K-League	27	9	2	3	4	0	-		33	12
2012	Seongnam Ilhwa Chunma	K-League	16	1	1	0	-	-	6	2	23	3
Career total			93	17	9	7	17	3	6	2	125	29

== International career ==
Han was called national team in 2014 WCQ match against Lebanon (2 September 2011) and Kuwait (6 September 2011) but didn't play the games.

Korea Republic national team
Year	Apps	Goals
2011	0	0
2012	2	0
Total	2	0
