= 2012 Seongnam Ilhwa Chunma season =

Seongnam Ilhwa Chunma
2012 season
- Chairman: Park Kyu-Nam
- Manager: Shin Tae-Yong
- K-League: 12th
- Korean FA Cup: Round of 16
- Champions League: Round of 16
- Top goalscorer: League: Éverton Santos (7); All: Éverton Santos (10)
- Highest home attendance: 6,725 vs Sangju (March 11)
- Lowest home attendance: 1,220 vs Gwangju (April 22)
- Average home league attendance: 3,575 (as of May 29)
Home colours	Away colours

The 2012 season was Seongnam Ilhwa Chunma's twenty-fourth season in the K-League in South Korea. Seongnam Ilhwa Chunma is competing K-League, Korean FA Cup and AFC Champions League.

== Current squad ==
Note: Flags indicate national team as defined under FIFA eligibility rules; some limited exceptions apply. Players may hold more than one non-FIFA nationality.

No.	Pos.	Nation	Player
1	GK	KOR	Ha Kang-Jin
3	DF	KOR	Yun Young-Sun
4	DF	AUS	Saša Ognenovski
5	DF	KOR	Lee Jae-Gwang
6	DF	KOR	Park Jin-Po
8	MF	KOR	Kim Seong-Jun
9	FW	BRA	Éverton Santos
10	FW	SRB	Vladimir Jovančić
11	MF	KOR	Han Sang-Woon
12	DF	KOR	Hong Chul
13	MF	KOR	Lee Hyun-Ho
14	MF	KOR	Yoon Bit-Garam
15	FW	KOR	Kim Pyung-Rae
16	DF	KOR	Kim Sung-hwan
17	FW	KOR	Jeon Hyun-Cheol
18	FW	KOR	Lee Chang-Hoon
19	DF	KOR	Namgung Woong
20	FW	BRA	Héverton (on loan from Portuguesa)
21	GK	KOR	Jung San
22	MF	KOR	Jeon Sung-Chan

No.	Pos.	Nation	Player
23	DF	KOR	Joo Yeong-Jae
24	DF	KOR	Hwang Jae-Won
25	DF	KOR	Kim Tae-Yoo
26	MF	KOR	Park Se-Young
27	FW	KOR	Sim Jae-Myung
28	DF	KOR	Bae Ki-Jin
29	DF	KOR	Lee Chang-Won
30	FW	KOR	Kim Deok-Il
31	GK	KOR	Lee Jin-Kyu
32	MF	KOR	Kim Young-Jae
33	MF	KOR	Kim Hyun-woo
34	MF	KOR	Jeon Kwan-Woo
35	DF	KOR	Lim Jong-Eun
36	MF	KOR	Kyeon Hee-Jae
37	MF	KOR	Kwon Soon-Kyu
38	MF	KOR	Yoo Joon-Bong
39	MF	KOR	Kim Se-Hoon
40	MF	KOR	Kim Young-Nam
41	GK	KOR	Jung Da-Woon
45	DF	KOR	Lim Dong-Geon

=== Out on loan ===
Note: Flags indicate national team as defined under FIFA eligibility rules; some limited exceptions apply. Players may hold more than one non-FIFA nationality.

No.	Pos.	Nation	Player
—	GK	KOR	Jung Eui-Do (at National Police Agency for military service)
—	DF	KOR	Yong Hyun-Jin (at Sangju Sangmu Phoenix for military service)
—	DF	KOR	Jeong Ho-Jeong (at Sangju Sangmu Phoenix for military service)
—	MF	KOR	Kim Cheol-Ho (at Sangju Sangmu Phoenix for military service)
—	MF	KOR	Park Sang-Hee (at Sangju Sangmu Phoenix for military service)

No.	Pos.	Nation	Player
—	MF	KOR	Jang Suk-Won (at Sangju Sangmu Phoenix for military service)
—	GK	KOR	Kang Sung-Kwan (at Sangju Sangmu Phoenix for military service)
—	MF	KOR	Lee Chi-Joon (at National Police Agency for military service)
—	FW	KOR	Han Dong-Won (at Suwon Samsung Bluewings)
—	FW	KOR	Namgung Do (at Daejeon Citizen)

== Transfer ==
=== In ===
Note: Flags indicate national team as defined under FIFA eligibility rules; some limited exceptions apply. Players may hold more than one non-FIFA nationality.

No.	Pos.	Nation	Player
—	DF	KOR	Lee Jae-Gwang (Drafted from Incheon University)
—	DF	KOR	Bae Ki-Jin (Drafted from Myongji University)
—	DF	KOR	Lee Chang-Won (Drafted from Kwangwoon University)
—	DF	KOR	Kim Young-Jae (Drafted from Gwangmyeong Technical High School)
—	DF	KOR	Lee Young-Hoon (Drafted from Yewon Arts University)
—	DF	KOR	Lim Jong-Eun (Transferred from Ulsan Hyundai FC)
—	MF	KOR	Kim Tae-Yoo (Drafted from Yongin University)
—	MF	KOR	Kyeon Hee-Jae (Drafted from Korea University)
—	MF	KOR	Jeon Kwan-Woo (Drafted from Sangji University)
—	MF	KOR	Kim Young-Nam (Drafted from Chungang University)
—	MF	KOR	Kim Seong-Jun (Transferred from Daejeon Citizen)

No.	Pos.	Nation	Player
—	MF	KOR	Yoon Bit-Garam (Transferred from Gyeongnam FC)
—	FW	KOR	Jeon Hyun-Cheol (Drafted from Ajou University)
—	FW	KOR	Park Se-Young (Drafted from Dong-A University)
—	FW	KOR	Kim Hyun-woo (Drafted from Kwangwoon University)
—	FW	SRB	Vladimir Jovančić (Transferred from FK Partizan)
—	FW	KOR	Lee Hyun-Ho (Transferred from Jeju United FC)
—	FW	KOR	Han Sang-Woon (Transferred from Busan I'Park)
—	DF	KOR	Hwang Jae-Won (Transferred from Suwon Samsung Bluewings)
—	MF	KOR	Yoo Joon-Bong (Drafted from Pai Chai University)
—	MF	KOR	Kwon Soon-Kyu (Drafted from Gabcheon High School)
—	DF	KOR	Lim Dong-Geon (Drafted from Myongji University)

=== Out ===
Note: Flags indicate national team as defined under FIFA eligibility rules; some limited exceptions apply. Players may hold more than one non-FIFA nationality.

No.	Pos.	Nation	Player
—	DF	KOR	Jang Hak-Young (Transferred to Busan I'Park)
—	FW	MNE	Dzenan Radoncic (Transferred to Suwon Samsung Bluewings)
—	FW	KOR	Song Ho-Young (Transferred to Jeju United FC)
—	FW	KOR	Han Keu-Roo (Transferred to Daejeon Citizen)

No.	Pos.	Nation	Player
—	MF	KOR	Jo Jae-Cheol (Transferred to Gyeongnam FC)
—	DF	KOR	Kim Tae-Yoon (Transferred to Incheon United FC)
—	FW	KOR	Cho Dong-Geon (Transferred to Suwon Samsung Bluewings)
—	FW	KOR	Namgung Do (Loan to Daejeon Citizen)

== Coaching staff ==
Position	Staff
Manager	(South Korea) Shin Tae-Yong
Assistant Manager	(South Korea) Kim Do-Hoon
GK Coach	(South Korea) Cha Sang-Kwang
Coach	(South Korea) Lee Young-Jin
Coach	(South Korea) Kim Sung-Il

Last updated: 10 March 2012
Source: Seongnam Ilhwa Chunma

== Match results ==
=== K-League ===
All times are Korea Standard Time (KST) – UTC+9

Date Round	Home	Score	Away	Location

3 March 1	Jeonbuk	3–2	Seongnam	Jeonju, Jeonbuk
15:00	Lee Dong-Gook 13', 18'; Eninho 82'	Report	Éverton Santos 24' (Assist by No.6), 50'	Stadium: Jeonju World Cup Stadium; Attendance: 20,198; Referee: Kim Jong-Hyuk

11 March 2	Seongnam	1–1	Sangju	Seongnam, Gyeonggi
15:00	Jovančić 90+5' (Assist by No.35)	Report	Ko Cha-Won 50'	Stadium: Tancheon Sports Complex; Attendance: 6,725; Referee: Woo Sang-Il

16 March 3	Ulsan	3–0	Seongnam	Nam-gu, Ulsan
19:00	Lee Keun-Ho 45', 51', 75'	Report		Stadium: Ulsan Munsu Football Stadium; Attendance: 1,107; Referee: Lee Min-Hu

25 March 4	Gangwon	1–2	Seongnam	Gangneung, Gangwon
15:00	Shimada 57'	Report	Éverton Santos 24'; Éverton Santos 37' (Assist by No.14)	Stadium: Gangneung Stadium; Attendance: 5,172; Referee: Kim Dae-Yong

30 March 5	Seongnam	0–1	Busan	Seongnam, Gyeonggi
19:30		Report	Kim Chang-Soo 88'	Stadium: Tancheon Sports Complex; Attendance: 1,886; Referee: Song Min-Seok

8 April 6	Seongnam	0–2	Pohang	Seongnam, Gyeonggi
15:00		Report	Asamoah 49'; Zicu 80'	Stadium: Tancheon Sports Complex; Attendance: 3,697; Referee: Choi Myung-Yong

11 April 7	Chunnam	0–1	Seongnam	Gwangyang, Jeonnam
15:00		Report	Jovančić 51' (Assist by No.20)	Stadium: Gwangyang Football Stadium; Attendance: 2,943; Referee: Kim Sung-Ho

14 April 8	Daejeon	0–1	Seongnam	Yuseong-gu, Daejeon
15:00		Report	Lee Chang-Hoon 44' (Assist by No.16); Kim Sung-hwan (footballer) (yellow card) 24' (yellow-red card) 45+1'	Stadium: Daejeon World Cup Stadium; Attendance: 2,488; Referee: Woo Sang-Il

22 April 9	Seongnam	4–2	Gwangju	Seongnam, Gyeonggi
17:00	Éverton 49' (Assist by No.8); Éverton 55' (Assist by No.8); Éverton 72'; Park Se-Young 80' (Assist by No.13)	Report	Milić 35', 59'	Stadium: Tancheon Sports Complex; Attendance: 1,220; Referee: Kim Dong-Jin

28 April 10	Suwon	2–1	Seongnam	Suwon, Gyeonggi
15:00	Éverton 46'; Ristić 70'	Report	Héverton 2'	Stadium: Suwon World Cup Stadium; Attendance: 16,970; Referee: Ko Keum-Bok

5 May 11	Seongnam	1–1	Jeju	Seongnam, Gyeonggi
15:00	Hong Chul (red card) 55'; Lim Jong-Eun 80' (Assist by No.8)	Report	Song Jin-Hyung 77'	Stadium: Tancheon Sports Complex; Attendance: 4,543; Referee: Lee Jong-Guk

11 May 12	Seongnam	1–0	Incheon	Seongnam, Gyeonggi
19:30	Han Sang-Woon 88' (Assist by No.14)	Report		Stadium: Tancheon Sports Complex; Attendance: 3,480; Referee: Kim Jong-Hyuk

20 May 13	Gyeongnam	2–0	Seongnam	Changwon, Gyeongnam
17:00	Caíque 53'; Jo Jae-Cheol 81'	Report		Stadium: Changwon Football Center; Attendance: 2,766; Referee: Kim Wan-Tae

26 May 14	Seongnam	0–0	Daegu	Seongnam, Gyeonggi
17:00	Yoon Bit-Garam (yellow card) 39' (yellow-red card) 40'	Report		Stadium: Tancheon Sports Complex; Attendance: 3,017; Referee: Kim Sung-Ho

9 June 22	Seongnam	2–0	Gyeongnam	Seongnam, Gyeonggi
19:00	Jeon Hyun-Cheol 30' (Assist by No.11); Jovančić 89' (Assist by No.6)	Report	Kim Jong-Soo (yellow card) 29' (yellow-red card) 58'	Stadium: Tancheon Sports Complex; Attendance: 3,765; Referee: Choi Myung-Yong

14 June 15	Seoul	1–0	Seongnam	Mapo-gu, Seoul
20:00	Kim Jin-Kyu 23'	Report		Stadium: Seoul World Cup Stadium; Attendance: 9,276; Referee: Yoo Seon-Ho

17 June 16	Busan	1–0	Seongnam	Yeonje-gu, Busan
19:00	Lee Kyung-Ryul 61'	Report		Stadium: Busan Asiad Stadium; Attendance: 9,276; Referee: Song Min-Seok

23 June 17	Seongnam	0–3	Daejeon	Seongnam, Gyeonggi
19:00	Yoon Bit-Garam (red card) 90+4'	Report	Oris 2'; Kim Hyeung-Bum 17'; Kim Tae-Yeon 51'	Stadium: Tancheon Sports Complex; Attendance: 2,306; Referee: Lee Min-Hu

27 June 18	Incheon	0–0	Seongnam	Nam-gu, Incheon
19:30		Report		Stadium: Incheon Football Stadium; Attendance: 1,438; Referee: Moon Jin-Hee

==== League table ====
Pos	Team	Pld	W	D	L	GF	GA	GD	Pts
10	Daegu FC	44	16	13	15	55	56	−1	61
11	Jeonnam Dragons	44	13	14	17	47	60	−13	53
12	Seongnam Ilhwa Chunma	44	14	10	20	47	56	−9	52
13	Daejeon Citizen	44	13	11	20	46	67	−21	50
14	Gangwon FC	44	14	7	23	57	68	−11	49

Source: K League
Rules for classification: 1) Points; 2) Goal difference; 3) Goals scored.

==== Results summary ====
Overall								Home						Away					
Pld	W	D	L	GF	GA	GD	Pts	W	D	L	GF	GA	GD	W	D	L	GF	GA	GD
19	6	4	9	16	23	−7	22	3	3	3	9	10	−1	3	1	6	7	13	−6

==== Results by round ====
Round	1	2	3	4	5	6	7	8	9	10	11	12	13	14	15	16	17	18	19	20	21	22	23	24	25	26	27	28	29	30	31	32	33	34	35	36	37	38	39	40	41	42	43	44
Ground	A	H	A	A	H	H	A	A	H	A	H	H	A	H	H	A	A	H	A																									
Result	L	D	L	W	L	L	W	W	W	L	D	W	L	D	W	L	L	L	D																									
Position	11	9	14	12	14	15	12	11	9	10	10	7	10	10	7	8	10	9	10																									

Updated to match(es) played on 28 June 2012. Source: League Fixtures and Results
A = Away; H = Home; W = Win; D = Draw; L = Loss

=== Korean FA Cup ===
23 May Round of 32	Seongnam Ilhwa Chunma	5–1	Suwon City	Seongnam, Gyeonggi
19:00 KST	Ognenovski 5' (Assist by No.11); Han Sang-Woon 14' (Assist by No.13); Yoon Bit-Garam 57' (Assist by No.10); Kim Sung-hwan 64' (Assist by No.4); Jo Tae-Woo 77' (o.g.)		Lim Sung-Taek 45+1'	Stadium: Tancheon Sports Complex; Attendance: 1,958; Referee: Yoo Seon-Ho

20 June Round of 16	Seongnam Ilhwa Chunma	1–2	Ulsan Hyundai	Jeonju, Jeonbuk
19:00 KST	Éverton 6'		Kim Shin-Wook 88'; Maranhão 90+1'	Stadium: Jeonju World Cup Stadium; Attendance: 2,849; Referee: Ko Hyung-Jin

=== AFC Champions League ===
==== Group stage (Group G) ====
Pos	Team	Pld	W	D	L	GF	GA	GD	Pts	Qualification	SIC	NGY	CCM	TTD
1	(South Korea) Seongnam Ilhwa Chunma	6	2	4	0	13	5	+8	10 (Note: Seongnam Ilhwa Chunma and Nagoya Grampus are tied on their head-to-head record (2 pts, 0 GD, 3 GF), and so are ranked by their overall goal difference.)	Advance to knockout stage	—	1–1	5–0	1–1
2	(Japan) Nagoya Grampus	6	2	4	0	10	4	+6	10	Advance to knockout stage	2–2	—	3–0	0–0
3	(Australia) Central Coast Mariners	6	1	3	2	7	11	−4	6		1–1	1–1	—	5–1
4	(China) Tianjin Teda	6	0	3	3	2	12	−10	3		0–3	0–3	0–0	—

Source: WorldFootball.net
Notes:

7 March Match 1	Nagoya Grampus (Japan)	2–2	(South Korea) Seongnam Ilhwa Chunma	Nagoya, Japan
19:00 UTC+9	Kennedy 58' (pen.); Kanazaki 74'	Report	Héverton 47', 90+3' (Assist by No.9)	Stadium: Mizuho Athletic Stadium; Attendance: 6,686; Referee: Nawaf Shukralla (Bahrain)

21 March Match 2	Seongnam Ilhwa Chunma (South Korea)	1–1	(China) Tianjin Teda	Seongnam, South Korea
19:00 UTC+9	Han Sang-Woon 14' (Assist by No.6)	Report	Goian 69'	Stadium: Tancheon Sports Complex; Attendance: 2,553; Referee: Abdullah Balideh (Bahrain)

3 April Match 3	Central Coast Mariners (Australia)	1–1	(South Korea) Seongnam Ilhwa Chunma	Gosford, Australia
19:00 UTC+10	Kwasnik 51'	Report	Éverton Santos 58' (Assist by No.22)	Stadium: Central Coast Stadium; Attendance: 5,018; Referee: Valentin Kovalenko (Uzbekistan)

18 April Match 4	Seongnam Ilhwa Chunma (South Korea)	5–0	(Australia) Central Coast Mariners	Seongnam, South Korea
19:30 UTC+9	Lee Chang-Hoon 39' (Assist by No.20); Éverton 43' (Assist by No.10); Kim Sung-hwan 69' (Assist by No.20); Éverton 73' (pen.); Jovančić 84' (Assist by No.9)	Report		Stadium: Tancheon Sports Complex; Attendance: 2,017; Referee: Saeid Mozaffarizadeh (Iran)

1 May Match 5	Seongnam Ilhwa Chunma (South Korea)	1–1	(Japan) Nagoya Grampus	Seongnam, South Korea
19:30 UTC+9	Han Sang-Woon 12' (Free kick)	Report	Park Jin-Po 72' (o.g.)	Stadium: Tancheon Sports Complex; Attendance: 6,379; Referee: Ali Al Badwawi (UAE)

15 May Match 6	Tianjin Teda (China)	0–3	(South Korea) Seongnam Ilhwa Chunma	Tianjin, China PR
19:30 UTC+8		Report	Yoon Bit-Garam 32'; Jovančić 48' (Assist by No.13); Jovančić 69' (pen.)	Stadium: TEDA Football Stadium; Attendance: 0 Referee: Alireza Faghani (Iran)

==== Knockout stage ====
29 May Round of 16	Seongnam Ilhwa Chunma (South Korea)	0–1	(Uzbekistan) Bunyodkor	Seongnam, South Korea
19:30 UTC+9		Report	Karimov 53' (pen.)	Stadium: Tancheon Sports Complex; Attendance: 3,808; Referee: Mohsen Torky (Iran)

=== Friendly tournament ===
==== Asian Challenge Cup ====
23 January Semifinal	Guangzhou R&F (China)	1–5	(South Korea) Seongnam Ilhwa Chunma	Hong Kong
16:00 UTC+8	Zhang Shuo 45+'	Report	Héverton 12'; Han Sang-Woon 29', 37'; Jovančić 45+'; Yun Young-Sun 50'	Stadium: Hong Kong Stadium; Attendance: 9,879; Referee: Ng Chiu Kok (Hong Kong)

26 January Final	Seongnam Ilhwa Chunma (South Korea)	5–1	(Japan) Shimizu S-Pulse	Hong Kong
20:30 UTC+8	Éverton Santos 5', 38' (pen.); Héverton 17'; Han Sang-Woon 21'; Lee Chang-Hoon 76'	Report	Ito 68'	Stadium: Hong Kong Stadium; Attendance: 10,610; Referee: Ng Kai Lam (Hong Kong)

== Squad statistics ==
=== Appearances ===
Statistics accurate as of match played 27 June 2012

No.	Nat.	Pos.	Name	League		FA Cup		Champions League		Appearances		Goals
No.	Nat.	Pos.	Name	Apps	Goals	Apps	Goals	Apps	Goals	App (sub)	Total	Goals
1	(South Korea)	GK	Ha Kang-Jin	14	0	1	0	6	0	21 (0)	21	0
3	(South Korea)	DF	Yun Young-Sun	12 (3)	0	1	0	4 (2)	0	17 (5)	22	0
4	(Australia)	DF	Saša Ognenovski	9 (1)	0	2	1	5	0	16 (1)	17	1
5	(South Korea)	DF	Lee Jae-Gwang	0	0	0	0	0	0	0	0	0
6	(South Korea)	DF	Park Jin-Po	19	0	2	0	7	0	28 (0)	28	0
8	(South Korea)	MF	Kim Seong-Jun	14 (2)	0	1	0	4 (2)	0	19 (4)	23	0
9	(Brazil)	FW	Éverton Santos	13 (2)	7	1	1	4 (1)	3	18 (3)	21	11
10	(Serbia)	FW	Vladimir Jovančić	9 (6)	3	2	0	5	3	16 (6)	22	6
11	(South Korea)	MF	Han Sang-Woon	12 (3)	1	1 (1)	1	6	2	19 (4)	23	4
12	(South Korea)	DF	Hong Chul	13 (2)	0	1	0	3 (2)	0	17 (4)	21	0
13	(South Korea)	MF	Lee Hyun-Ho	3 (4)	0	1	0	1 (3)	0	5 (7)	12	0
14	(South Korea)	MF	Yoon Bit-Garam	12 (3)	0	2	1	5 (2)	1	19 (5)	24	2
15	(South Korea)	FW	Kim Pyung-Rae	1 (2)	0	0 (1)	0	0	0	1 (3)	4	0
16	(South Korea)	MF	Kim Sung-hwan	17	0	2	1	7	1	26 (0)	26	2
17	(South Korea)	FW	Jeon Hyun-Cheol	3 (3)	1	1	0	0	0	4 (3)	7	1
18	(South Korea)	MF	Lee Chang-Hoon	5 (5)	1	0	0	2 (1)	1	7 (6)	13	2
19	(South Korea)	DF	Namgung Woong	12 (1)	0	1 (1)	0	6	0	19 (2)	21	0
20	(Brazil)	FW	Héverton	13 (4)	1	1 (1)	0	5 (1)	2	19 (6)	25	3
21	(South Korea)	GK	Jung San	5	0	1	0	1	0	7 (0)	7	0
22	(South Korea)	MF	Jeon Sung-Chan	3 (3)	0	0	0	1 (2)	0	4 (5)	9	0
23	(South Korea)	DF	Joo Yeong-Jae	0	0	0	0	0	0	0	0	0
24	(South Korea)	DF	Hwang Jae-Won	0	0	0	0	0	0	0	0	0
25	(South Korea)	DF	Kim Tae-Yoo	0	0	0	0	0	0	0	0	0
26	(South Korea)	MF	Park Se-Young	0 (2)	1	0	0	0	0	0 (2)	2	1
27	(South Korea)	FW	Sim Jae-Myung	0 (2)	0	0	0	0	0	0 (2)	2	0
28	(South Korea)	DF	Bae Ki-Jin	0	0	0	0	0	0	0	0	0
29	(South Korea)	DF	Lee Chang-Won	0	0	0	0	0	0	0	0	0
30	(South Korea)	FW	Kim Deok-Il	1 (4)	0	0 (1)	0	0 (2)	0	1 (7)	8	0
31	(South Korea)	GK	Lee Jin-Kyu	0	0	0	0	0	0	0	0	0
32	(South Korea)	MF	Kim Young-Jae	0	0	0	0	0	0	0	0	0
33	(South Korea)	MF	Kim Hyun-woo	2 (1)	0	0 (1)	0	0 (1)	0	2 (3)	5	0
34	(South Korea)	MF	Jeon Kwan-Woo	0	0	0	0	0	0	0	0	0
35	(South Korea)	DF	Lim Jong-Eun	17 (1)	1	1	0	5 (1)	0	23 (2)	25	1
36	(South Korea)	MF	Kyeon Hee-Jae	0	0	0	0	0	0	0	0	0
37	(South Korea)	MF	Kwon Soon-Kyu	0	0	0	0	0	0	0	0	0
38	(South Korea)	MF	Yoo Joon-Bong	0	0	0	0	0	0	0	0	0
39	(South Korea)	MF	Kim Se-Hoon	0	0	0	0	0	0	0	0	0
40	(South Korea)	MF	Kim Young-Nam	0	0	0	0	0	0	0	0	0
41	(South Korea)	GK	Jung Da-Woon	0	0	0	0	0	0	0	0	0
45	(South Korea)	DF	Lim Dong-Geon	0	0	0	0	0	0	0	0	0

=== Goals and assists ===
Rank	Nation	Number	Name	K-League		KFA Cup		Champions League		Sum		Total
Rank	Nation	Number	Name	Goals	Assists	Goals	Assists	Goals	Assists	Goals	Assists	Total
1	(Brazil)	9	Éverton Santos	7	0	1	0	3	2	11	2	13
2	(Serbia)	10	Vladimir Jovančić	3	0	0	1	3	1	6	2	8
3	(South Korea)	11	Han Sang-Woon	1	1	1	1	2	0	4	2	6
=	(Brazil)	20	Héverton	1	1	0	0	2	2	3	3	6
4	(South Korea)	14	Yoon Bit-Garam	0	2	1	0	1	0	2	2	4
5	(South Korea)	16	Kim Sung-hwan	0	1	1	0	1	0	2	1	3
=	(South Korea)	8	Kim Seong-Jun	0	3	0	0	0	0	0	3	3
=	(South Korea)	6	Park Jin-Po	0	2	0	0	0	1	0	3	3
=	(South Korea)	13	Lee Hyun-Ho	0	1	0	1	0	1	0	3	3
6	(South Korea)	18	Lee Chang-Hoon	1	0	0	0	1	0	2	0	2
=	(Australia)	4	Saša Ognenovski	0	0	1	1	0	0	1	1	2
7	(South Korea)	17	Jeon Hyun-Cheol	1	0	0	0	0	0	1	0	1
=	(South Korea)	26	Park Se-Young	1	0	0	0	0	0	1	0	1
=	(South Korea)	35	Lim Jong-Eun	1	0	0	0	0	0	1	0	1
=	(South Korea)	22	Jeon Sung-Chan	0	0	0	0	0	1	0	1	1
/	/	/	Own Goals	0	-	1	-	0	-	1	-	1
/	/	/	TOTALS	16	11	6	4	13	8	35	23	

=== Discipline ===
Position	Nation	Number	Name	K-League		KFA Cup		Champions League		Total	
Position	Nation	Number	Name	Booked	Sent off (straight red)	Booked	Sent off (straight red)	Booked	Sent off (straight red)	Booked	Sent off (straight red)
DF	(South Korea)	3	Yun Young-Sun	2	0	0	0	1	0	3	0
DF	(Australia)	4	Saša Ognenovski	2	0	0	0	1	0	3	0
DF	(South Korea)	6	Park Jin-Po	1	0	1	0	0	0	2	0
MF	(South Korea)	8	Kim Seong-Jun	3	0	0	0	0	0	3	0
FW	(Brazil)	9	Éverton Santos	1	0	0	0	0	0	1	0
FW	(Serbia)	10	Vladimir Jovančić	5	0	0	0	2	0	7	0
FW	(South Korea)	11	Han Sang-Woon	1	0	0	0	0	0	1	0
DF	(South Korea)	12	Hong Chul	3	1	0	0	2	0	5	1
MF	(South Korea)	14	Yoon Bit-Garam	5	2	0	0	0	0	5	2
FW	(South Korea)	15	Kim Pyung-Rae	1	0	0	0	0	0	1	0
MF	(South Korea)	16	Kim Sung-hwan	6	1	1	0	1	0	8	1
MF	(South Korea)	18	Lee Chang-Hoon	2	0	0	0	1	0	3	0
DF	(South Korea)	19	Namgung Woong	3	0	0	0	0	0	3	0
FW	(Brazil)	20	Héverton	5	0	0	0	0	0	5	0
GK	(South Korea)	21	Jung San	0	0	0	0	1	0	1	0
MF	(South Korea)	22	Jeon Sung-Chan	0	0	0	0	1	0	1	0
MF	(South Korea)	30	Kim Deok-Il	1	0	0	0	0	0	1	0
MF	(South Korea)	33	Kim Hyun-woo	2	0	0	0	0	0	2	0
DF	(South Korea)	35	Lim Jong-Eun	2	0	0	0	1	0	3	0
/	/	/	TOTALS	45	4	2	0	11	0	58	4
