= 2012 Asian Challenge Cup =

International association football tournament in Hong Kong

The 2012 Asian Challenge Cup (Chinese: 亞洲超級球會挑戰盃2012), also known as the Nikon Asian Challenge Cup 2012, is the annual football event held in Hong Kong during Lunar New Year. The name of this event was changed from the Lunar New Year Cup to the Asian Challenge Cup in 2011.

== Teams ==
Team	Country	League last season	Pos.
South China	Hong Kong	First Division	2nd
Guangzhou R&F	China	League One	2nd
Shimizu S-Pulse	Japan	J. League	10th
Seongnam Ilhwa Chunma	South Korea	K-League	10th

== Squads ==
=== South China ===
Manager: (Slovakia) Ján Kocian

No.	Pos.	Player	Date of birth (age)	Caps	Club
1	GK	(Hong Kong) Yapp Hung Fai	21 March 1990 (aged 21)		(Hong Kong) South China
2	DF	(Hong Kong) Lee Chi Ho	16 November 1982 (aged 29)		(Hong Kong) South China
3	DF	(South Korea) Yeo Jee-hoon	11 August 1992 (aged 19)		(Hong Kong) South China
5	MF	(Hong Kong) Bai He	19 November 1983 (aged 28)		(Hong Kong) South China
6	DF	(Hong Kong) Wong Chin Hung	2 March 1982 (aged 29)		(Hong Kong) South China
7	FW	(Hong Kong) Chan Siu Ki	14 July 1985 (aged 26)		(Hong Kong) South China
8	MF	(Hong Kong) Xu Deshuai	13 July 1987 (aged 24)		(Hong Kong) South China
9	MF	(Hong Kong) Lee Wai Lim	5 May 1981 (aged 30)		(Hong Kong) South China
10	MF	(Hong Kong) Au Yeung Yiu Chung	11 July 1989 (aged 22)		(Hong Kong) South China
11	MF	(Hong Kong) Li Haiqiang	3 May 1977 (aged 34)		(Hong Kong) South China
12	MF	(Hong Kong) Man Pei Tak	16 February 1982 (aged 29)		(Hong Kong) South China
15	DF	(Hong Kong) Chan Wai Ho	19 November 1983 (aged 28)		(Hong Kong) South China
16	MF	(Hong Kong) Leung Chun Pong	1 October 1986 (aged 25)		(Hong Kong) South China
18	MF	(Hong Kong) Kwok Kin Pong	30 March 1987 (aged 24)		(Hong Kong) South China
19	FW	(Brazil) Dhiego de Souza Martins	27 August 1988 (aged 23)		(Hong Kong) South China
20	MF	(Brazil) João Emir Porto Ferreira	17 March 1989 (aged 22)		(Hong Kong) South China
21	MF	(Brazil) Edgar Aldrighi Júnior	30 March 1974 (aged 37)		(Hong Kong) South China
22	FW	(Brazil) Giovane Alves da Silva	25 November 1982 (aged 29)		(Hong Kong) South China
23	GK	(Hong Kong) Zhang Chunhui	14 March 1983 (aged 28)		(Hong Kong) South China
25	MF	(Brazil) Wellingsson de Souza	7 September 1989 (aged 22)		(Hong Kong) South China
26	MF	(Hong Kong) Chan Pak Hang	21 November 1992 (aged 19)		(Hong Kong) South China
30	DF	(Brazil) Joel Bertoti Padilha	24 July 1980 (aged 31)		(Hong Kong) South China
31	FW	(Hong Kong) Cheng Lai Hin	31 March 1986 (aged 25)		(Hong Kong) South China
32	GK	(Hong Kong) Fan Chun Yip	1 May 1976 (aged 35)		(Hong Kong) South China
33	DF	(Hong Kong) Ng Wai Chiu	22 October 1981 (aged 30)		(Hong Kong) South China
38	FW	(Serbia) Mateja Kežman	12 April 1979 (aged 32)		(Hong Kong) South China

=== Guangzhou R&F ===
Manager: (Brazil) Sérgio Farias

No.	Pos.	Player	Date of birth (age)	Caps	Club
1	GK	(China) Cheng Yuelei	28 October 1987 (aged 24)		(China) Guangzhou R&F
2	DF	(China) Sui Donglu	21 June 1983 (aged 28)		(China) Guangzhou R&F
3	DF	(China) Liu Cheng	23 October 1983 (aged 28)		(China) Guangzhou R&F
4	DF	(China) Li Wenbo	9 December 1983 (aged 28)		(China) Guangzhou R&F
5	DF	(China) Wang Bin	23 May 1989 (aged 22)		(China) Guangzhou R&F
6	DF	(China) Xu Bo	18 May 1985 (aged 26)		(China) Guangzhou R&F
7	MF	(China) Yu Guijun	15 April 1985 (aged 26)		(China) Guangzhou R&F
9	FW	(China) Wen Chao	16 January 1987 (aged 25)		(China) Guangzhou R&F
10	MF	(China) Wu Weian	1 September 1981 (aged 30)		(China) Guangzhou R&F
11	FW	(Brazil) Rafael Coelho Luiz	20 May 1988 (aged 23)		(China) Guangzhou R&F
16	MF	(China) Zhang Ao	16 January 1991 (aged 21)		(China) Guangzhou R&F
17	MF	(China) Li Zhe	30 November 1989 (aged 22)		(China) Guangzhou R&F
18	FW	(China) Zhang Yuan	28 January 1989 (aged 22)		(China) Guangzhou R&F
19	MF	(China) Pan Chi	9 May 1991 (aged 20)		(China) Guangzhou R&F
20	DF	(China) Tang Miao	16 October 1990 (aged 21)		(China) Guangzhou R&F
21	MF	(China) Gao Zengxiang	21 December 1989 (aged 22)		(China) Guangzhou R&F
22	MF	(China) Wang Zihua	3 April 1993 (aged 18)		(China) Guangzhou R&F
23	MF	(China) Lu Lin	3 February 1985 (aged 26)		(China) Guangzhou R&F
24	MF	(China) Li Lingwei	18 February 1992 (aged 19)		(China) Guangzhou R&F
26	MF	(China) Zhao Ming	24 December 1984 (aged 27)		(China) Guangzhou R&F
27	DF	(China) Gao Jiulong	27 July 1989 (aged 22)		(China) Guangzhou R&F
28	MF	(China) Huang Long	13 January 1981 (aged 31)		(China) Guangzhou R&F
29	FW	(China) Zhang Shuo	17 September 1983 (aged 28)		(China) Guangzhou R&F
30	GK	(China) Shi Xiaotian	6 March 1990 (aged 21)		(China) Guangzhou R&F
31	GK	(China) Wang Lüe	19 May 1985 (aged 26)		(China) Guangzhou R&F
	MF	(Brazil) Jumar José da Costa Júnior	28 April 1986 (aged 25)		(China) Guangzhou R&F

=== Shimizu S-Pulse ===
Manager: (Iran) Afshin Ghotbi

No.	Pos.	Player	Date of birth (age)	Caps	Club
1	GK	(Japan) Kaito Yamamoto	10 July 1985 (aged 26)		(Japan) Shimizu S-Pulse
2	DF	(Japan) Taisuke Muramatsu	16 December 1989 (aged 22)		(Japan) Shimizu S-Pulse
3	DF	(Japan) Yasuhiro Hiraoka	23 May 1986 (aged 25)		(Japan) Shimizu S-Pulse
4	DF	(Netherlands) Calvin Jong-a-Pin	8 July 1986 (aged 25)		(Japan) Shimizu S-Pulse
5	DF	(Japan) Keisuke Iwashita	24 September 1986 (aged 25)		(Japan) Shimizu S-Pulse
6	MF	(Japan) Kota Sugiyama	24 January 1985 (aged 26)		(Japan) Shimizu S-Pulse
7	MF	(Australia) Alex Brosque	12 October 1983 (aged 28)		(Japan) Shimizu S-Pulse
8	MF	(Japan) Takuma Edamura	16 November 1986 (aged 25)		(Japan) Shimizu S-Pulse
11	FW	(Japan) Genki Omae	10 December 1989 (aged 22)		(Japan) Shimizu S-Pulse
13	MF	(Japan) Toshiyuki Takagi	25 May 1991 (aged 20)		(Japan) Shimizu S-Pulse
14	FW	(Japan) Sho Ito	24 July 1988 (aged 23)		(Japan) Shimizu S-Pulse
17	MF	(Japan) Yosuke Kawai	4 August 1989 (aged 22)		(Japan) Shimizu S-Pulse
18	MF	(Japan) Shinji Ono	27 September 1979 (aged 32)		(Japan) Shimizu S-Pulse
19	FW	(Japan) Naohiro Takahara	4 June 1979 (aged 32)		(Japan) Shimizu S-Pulse
21	GK	(Japan) Kenpei Usui	15 May 1987 (aged 24)		(Japan) Shimizu S-Pulse
24	MF	(Japan) Makoto Shibahara	23 April 1992 (aged 19)		(Japan) Shimizu S-Pulse
25	DF	(Japan) Tomoya Inukai	12 May 1993 (aged 18)		(Japan) Shimizu S-Pulse
26	FW	(Japan) Satoru Kashiwase	1 June 1993 (aged 18)		(Japan) Shimizu S-Pulse
27	FW	(Japan) Atomu Nabeta	1 May 1991 (aged 20)		(Japan) Shimizu S-Pulse
29	GK	(Japan) Masatoshi Kushibiki	29 January 1993 (aged 18)		(Japan) Shimizu S-Pulse
30	DF	(North Korea) Kang Song-ho	28 May 1987 (aged 24)		(Japan) Shimizu S-Pulse

=== Seongnam Ilhwa Chunma ===
Manager: (South Korea) Shin Tae-yong

No.	Pos.	Player	Date of birth (age)	Caps	Club
1	GK	(South Korea) Ha Kang-jin	30 January 1989 (aged 22)		(South Korea) Seongnam Ilhwa Chunma
3	DF	(South Korea) Yun Young-sun	4 October 1988 (aged 23)		(South Korea) Seongnam Ilhwa Chunma
4	DF	(Australia) Saša Ognenovski	3 April 1979 (aged 32)		(South Korea) Seongnam Ilhwa Chunma
6	DF	(South Korea) Park Jin-po	13 August 1987 (aged 24)		(South Korea) Seongnam Ilhwa Chunma
8	MF	(South Korea) Kim Seong-jun	8 April 1988 (aged 23)		(South Korea) Seongnam Ilhwa Chunma
9	FW	(South Korea) Cho Dong-geon	16 April 1986 (aged 25)		(South Korea) Seongnam Ilhwa Chunma
10	FW	(Serbia) Vladimir Jovančić	31 May 1987 (aged 24)		(South Korea) Seongnam Ilhwa Chunma
11	FW	(South Korea) Han Sang-woon	3 May 1986 (aged 25)		(South Korea) Seongnam Ilhwa Chunma
13	FW	(South Korea) Lee Hyun-ho	29 November 1988 (aged 23)		(South Korea) Seongnam Ilhwa Chunma
15	MF	(South Korea) Kim Pyung-rae	9 November 1987 (aged 24)		(South Korea) Seongnam Ilhwa Chunma
16	DF	(South Korea) Kim Sung-hwan	15 December 1986 (aged 25)		(South Korea) Seongnam Ilhwa Chunma
17	FW	(South Korea) Jeon Hyun-cheol	3 July 1990 (aged 21)		(South Korea) Seongnam Ilhwa Chunma
18	FW	(South Korea) Lee Chang-hoon	17 December 1986 (aged 25)		(South Korea) Seongnam Ilhwa Chunma
19	FW	(South Korea) Namgung woong	29 March 1984 (aged 27)		(South Korea) Seongnam Ilhwa Chunma
20	FW	(Brazil) Héverton Durães Coutinho Alves	28 October 1985 (aged 26)		(South Korea) Seongnam Ilhwa Chunma
21	GK	(South Korea) Jung San	10 February 1989 (aged 22)		(South Korea) Seongnam Ilhwa Chunma
22	MF	(South Korea) Jeon Sung-chan	27 December 1987 (aged 24)		(South Korea) Seongnam Ilhwa Chunma
24	DF	(South Korea) Lee Jae-kwang	19 October 1989 (aged 22)		(South Korea) Seongnam Ilhwa Chunma
25	MF	(South Korea) Kim Tae-yoo	27 April 1989 (aged 22)		(South Korea) Seongnam Ilhwa Chunma
27	FW	(South Korea) Sim Jae-myung	7 June 1989 (aged 22)		(South Korea) Seongnam Ilhwa Chunma
31	GK	(South Korea) Lee Jin-kyu	20 May 1988 (aged 23)		(South Korea) Seongnam Ilhwa Chunma
35	DF	(South Korea) Lim Jong-eun	18 June 1990 (aged 21)		(South Korea) Seongnam Ilhwa Chunma
50	FW	(Brazil) Éverton Santos	14 October 1986 (aged 25)		(South Korea) Seongnam Ilhwa Chunma

== Fixtures and results ==
=== Semi-finals ===
2012-02-08
16:00 (UTC+08:00)

Guangzhou R&F (China)	1–5	(South Korea) Seongnam Ilhwa Chunma
Zhang Shuo 45+'	Report	Héverton 12'; Han Sang-woon 29', 37'; Jovančić 45+?'; Yun Young-sun 50'

Hong Kong Stadium
Attendance: 9,879
Referee: Ng Chiu Kok (Hong Kong)
2012-02-08
18:30 (UTC+08:00)

South China (Hong Kong)	1–1	(Japan) Shimizu S-Pulse
Chan Siu Ki 67'	Report	Takagi 26'
Penalties
Joel (penalty missed); Wong Chin Hung (penalty scored); Chan Siu Ki (penalty missed); João Emir (penalty missed)	1–3	(penalty scored) Ono; (penalty missed) Omae; (penalty scored) Brosque; (penalty missed) Ito; (penalty scored) Takagi

Hong Kong Stadium
Attendance: 9,879
Referee: Liu Kwok Man (Hong Kong)

=== Third place match ===
2012-02-11
18:00 (UTC+08:00)

Guangzhou R&F (China)	1–1	(Hong Kong) South China
Li Zhe 90+5'	Report	Chan Wai Ho 42'
Penalties
Lu Lin (penalty scored); Yu Guijun (penalty missed); Xu Bo (penalty scored); Wu Weian (penalty scored)	3–1	(penalty scored) Wong Chin Hung; (penalty missed) Au Yeung Yiu Chung; (penalty missed) Leung Chun Pong; (penalty missed) Kežman

Hong Kong Stadium
Attendance: 10,610
Referee: Tong Kui Sum (Hong Kong)

=== Final ===
2012-02-11
20:30 (UTC+08:00)

Seongnam Ilhwa Chunma (South Korea)	5–1	(Japan) Shimizu S-Pulse
Éverton Santos 5', 38' (pen.); Héverton 17'; Han Sang-woon 21'; Lee Chang-hoon 76'	Report	Ito 68'

Hong Kong Stadium
Attendance: 10,610
Referee: Ng Kai Lam (Hong Kong)
