= 2012 AFC Champions League group stage =

Football tournament group stage

The 2012 AFC Champions League group stage was contested by a total of 32 teams (16 from West Zone and 16 from East Zone). They included:

- 28 teams which directly entered the 2012 AFC Cup group stage (14 from West Zone and 14 from East Zone)
- 4 winners of the 2012 AFC Champions League qualifying play-off final round (2 from West Zone and 2 from East Zone)

The draw for the group stage was held at the AFC house in Kuala Lumpur, Malaysia on 6 December 2011, 16:00 UTC+08:00. The 32 teams were drawn into eight groups of four. Clubs from the same country may not be drawn into the same group.

In each group, teams played each other home-and-away in a round-robin format. The matchdays were 6–7 March, 20–21 March, 3–4 April, 17–18 April, 1–2 May, and 15–16 May 2012. The winners and runners-up of each group advanced to the knockout stage.

== Tiebreakers ==
The teams are ranked according to points (3 points for a win, 1 point for a tie, 0 points for a loss) and tie breakers are in following order:

1. Greater number of points obtained in the group matches between the teams concerned;
2. Goal difference resulting from the group matches between the teams concerned;
3. Greater number of goals scored in the group matches between the teams concerned; (Away goals do not apply)
4. Goal difference in all the group matches;
5. Greater number of goals scored in all the group matches;
6. Kicks from the penalty mark if only two teams are involved and they are both on the field of play;
7. Fewer score calculated according to the number of yellow and red cards received in the group matches; (1 point for each yellow card, 3 points for each red card as a consequence of two yellow cards, 3 points for each direct red card, 4 points for each yellow card followed by a direct red card)
8. Drawing of lots.

== Groups ==
Each team had been numbered from 1 to 4, the numbers determine the order of the fixtures:

- Match Day 1: 1 vs 4, 3 vs 2
- Match Day 2: 2 vs 1, 4 vs 3
- Match Day 3: 1 vs 3, 4 vs 2
- Match Day 4: 3 vs 1, 2 vs 4
- Match Day 5: 4 vs 1, 2 vs 3
- Match Day 6: 1 vs 2, 3 vs 4

=== Group A ===
Pos	Team	Pld	W	D	L	GF	GA	GD	Pts	Qualification	JAZ	EST	RAY	NQA
1	(United Arab Emirates) Al-Jazira	6	5	1	0	18	10	+8	16	Advance to knockout stage	—	1–1	3–2	4–1
2	(Iran) Esteghlal	6	3	2	1	8	3	+5	11	Advance to knockout stage	1–2	—	3–0	0–0
3	(Qatar) Al-Rayyan	6	2	0	4	9	12	−3	6		3–4	0–1	—	3–1
4	(Uzbekistan) Nasaf Qarshi	6	0	1	5	4	14	−10	1		2–4	0–2	0–1	—

Source: WorldFootball.net
6 March 2012
18:20 UTC+03:00

Al-Rayyan (Qatar)	0–1	(Iran) Esteghlal
	Report	Jerković 90+1'

Ahmed bin Ali Stadium, Al Rayyan
Attendance: 5,422
Referee: Ben Williams (Australia)
7 March 2012^{1}
17:00 UTC+05:00

Nasaf Qarshi (Uzbekistan)	2–4	(United Arab Emirates) Al-Jazira
Musaev 2'; Rabee 18' (o.g.)	Report	Abdullah 39'; Mousa 68'; Baré 75'; Oliveira 88'

Qarshi Stadium, Qarshi
Attendance: 13,000
Referee: Choi Myung-Yong (Korea Republic)

20 March 2012
19:00 UTC+03:30

Esteghlal (Iran)	0–0	(Uzbekistan) Nasaf Qarshi
	Report

Azadi Stadium, Tehran
Attendance: 41,520
Referee: Abdullah Al Hilali (Oman)
20 March 2012
19:30 UTC+04:00

Al-Jazira (United Arab Emirates)	3–2	(Qatar) Al-Rayyan
Oliveira 8'; Diaky 54'; Mousa 57'	Report	Goumou 65'; Fábio César 78'

Mohammed Bin Zayed Stadium, Abu Dhabi
Attendance: 2,850
Referee: Ali Abdulnabi (Bahrain)

3 April 2012
19:00 UTC+04:30

Esteghlal (Iran)	1–2	(United Arab Emirates) Al-Jazira
Zandi 68'	Report	Abdullah 5'; Baré 72'

Azadi Stadium, Tehran
Attendance: 36,735
Referee: Kim Dong-Jin (Korea Republic)
3 April 2012
18:30 UTC+03:00

Al-Rayyan (Qatar)	3–1	(Uzbekistan) Nasaf Qarshi
Tabata 9'; Goumou 65'; Alaaeldin 88'	Report	Shomurodov 58'

Ahmed bin Ali Stadium, Al Rayyan
Attendance: 1,877
Referee: Yuichi Nishimura (Japan)

18 April 2012
19:30 UTC+05:00

Nasaf Qarshi (Uzbekistan)	0–1	(Qatar) Al-Rayyan
	Report	Tabata 62'

Qarshi Stadium, Qarshi
Attendance: 7,271
Referee: Lee Min-Hu (Korea Republic)
18 April 2012
19:45 UTC+04:00

Al-Jazira (United Arab Emirates)	1–1	(Iran) Esteghlal
Oliveira 63'	Report	Borhani 24'

Mohammed Bin Zayed Stadium, Abu Dhabi
Attendance: 4,562
Referee: Maasaki Toma (Japan)

2 May 2012
19:20 UTC+04:30

Esteghlal (Iran)	3–0	(Qatar) Al-Rayyan
Borhani 23' (pen.), 90+3'; Sharifat 76'	Report

Azadi Stadium, Tehran
Attendance: 53,774
Referee: Tan Hai (China PR)
2 May 2012
19:45 UTC+04:00

Al-Jazira (United Arab Emirates)	4–1	(Uzbekistan) Nasaf Qarshi
Baré 6'; Oliveira 14' (pen.), 33', 42' (pen.)	Report	Shomurodov 69'

Mohammed Bin Zayed Stadium, Abu Dhabi
Attendance: 820
Referee: Peter Green (Australia)

16 May 2012
19:30 UTC+05:00

Nasaf Qarshi (Uzbekistan)	0–2	(Iran) Esteghlal
	Report	Jerković 10'; Jabbari 50' (pen.)

Qarshi Stadium, Qarshi
Attendance: 929
Referee: Minoru Tōjō (Japan)
16 May 2012
18:55 UTC+03:00

Al-Rayyan (Qatar)	3–4	(United Arab Emirates) Al-Jazira
Tabata 73'; Leandro 76'; Alaaeldin 90'	Report	Oliveira 8', 33', 67', 88'

Ahmed bin Ali Stadium, Al Rayyan
Attendance: 535
Referee: Andre El Haddad (Lebanon)

Notes

- Note 1: Nasaf Qarshi v Al-Jazira was originally scheduled to be played on 6 March 2012, 19:30 UTC+05:00, but was postponed to the following day due to heavy snow in Qarshi.

=== Group B ===
Pos	Team	Pld	W	D	L	GF	GA	GD	Pts	Qualification	ITT	YAS	PAK	ARA
1	(Saudi Arabia) Al-Ittihad	6	5	1	0	13	4	+9	16	Advance to knockout stage	—	1–0	4–0	3–2
2	(United Arab Emirates) Baniyas	6	3	2	1	9	2	+7	11	Advance to knockout stage	0–0	—	2–0	2–0
3	(Uzbekistan) Pakhtakor	6	2	1	3	6	10	−4	7		1–2	1–1	—	3–1
4	(Qatar) Al-Arabi	6	0	0	6	4	16	−12	0		1–3	0–4	0–1	—

Source: WorldFootball.net
6 March 2012
18:50 UTC+04:00

Baniyas (United Arab Emirates)	2–0	(Qatar) Al-Arabi
Jaber 45' (pen.); Yeste 77'	Report

Baniyas Stadium, Abu Dhabi
Attendance: 1,795
Referee: Alireza Faghani (Iran)
6 March 2012
20:35 UTC+03:00

Al-Ittihad (Saudi Arabia)	4–0	(Uzbekistan) Pakhtakor
Abdelghani 4'; Abousaban 31', 51'; Omar 58'	Report

Prince Abdullah al-Faisal Stadium, Jeddah
Attendance: 250
Referee: Minoru Tōjō (Japan)

20 March 2012
17:30 UTC+05:00

Pakhtakor (Uzbekistan)	1–1	(United Arab Emirates) Baniyas
Sharofetdinov 29'	Report	Fawzi 60'

JAR Stadium, Tashkent
Attendance: 2,300
Referee: Choi Myung-Yong (Korea Republic)
20 March 2012
18:30 UTC+03:00

Al-Arabi (Qatar)	1–3	(Saudi Arabia) Al-Ittihad
Pisculichi 26'	Report	Hazazi 21', 82'; Al-Montashari 30'

Grand Hamad Stadium, Doha
Attendance: 1,855
Referee: Lee Min-Hu (Korea Republic)

4 April 2012
18:00 UTC+05:00

Pakhtakor (Uzbekistan)	3–1	(Qatar) Al-Arabi
Karimov 9'; Sharofetdinov 74'; Abdukholiqov 90+3'	Report	Pisculichi 37'

JAR Stadium, Tashkent
Attendance: 5,532
Referee: Tan Hai (China P.R.)
4 April 2012
20:45 UTC+03:00

Al-Ittihad (Saudi Arabia)	1–0	(United Arab Emirates) Baniyas
Hazazi 79' (pen.)	Report

Prince Abdullah al-Faisal Stadium, Jeddah
Attendance: 11,495
Referee: Ali Abdulnabi (Bahrain)

17 April 2012
19:05 UTC+04:00

Baniyas (United Arab Emirates)	0–0	(Saudi Arabia) Al-Ittihad
	Report

Baniyas Stadium, Abu Dhabi
Attendance: 6,265
Referee: Kim Dong-Jin (Korea Republic)
17 April 2012
19:00 UTC+03:00

Al-Arabi (Qatar)	0–1	(Uzbekistan) Pakhtakor
	Report	Abdukholiqov 41'

Grand Hamad Stadium, Doha
Attendance: 500
Referee: Nawaf Shukralla (Bahrain)

2 May 2012
18:30 UTC+05:00

Pakhtakor (Uzbekistan)	1–2	(Saudi Arabia) Al-Ittihad
Klimiashvili 68'	Report	Hazazi 60'; Abousaban 90+3'

JAR Stadium, Tashkent
Attendance: 4,000
Referee: Mohsen Torky (Iran)
2 May 2012
19:00 UTC+03:00

Al-Arabi (Qatar)	0–4	(United Arab Emirates) Baniyas
	Report	Bashir 17'; Yeste 39'; Mubarak 52'; Senghor 77'

Grand Hamad Stadium, Doha
Attendance: 527
Referee: Ryuji Sato (Japan)

16 May 2012
19:20 UTC+04:00

Baniyas (United Arab Emirates)	2–0	(Uzbekistan) Pakhtakor
Senghor 13'; Abdulrahman 71'	Report

Baniyas Stadium, Abu Dhabi
Attendance: 3,927
Referee: Malik Abdul Bashir (Singapore)
16 May 2012
21:00 UTC+03:00

Al-Ittihad (Saudi Arabia)	3–2	(Qatar) Al-Arabi
Abd Rabo 30'; N'Guessi 64'; Abdelghani 90+3'	Report	Khoukhi 9', 45+2'

Prince Abdullah al-Faisal Stadium, Jeddah
Attendance: 9,621
Referee: Abdullah Al Hilali (Oman)

=== Group C ===
Pos	Team	Pld	W	D	L	GF	GA	GD	Pts	Qualification	SEP	AHL	NAS	LEK
1	(Iran) Sepahan	6	4	1	1	9	4	+5	13	Advance to knockout stage	—	2–1	1–0	2–1
2	(Saudi Arabia) Al-Ahli	6	3	1	2	10	6	+4	10	Advance to knockout stage	1–1	—	3–1	3–0
3	(United Arab Emirates) Al-Nasr	6	2	0	4	6	11	−5	6 (Note: Al-Nasr and Lekhwiya are ranked by their head-to-head record (Al-Nasr: 6 pts; Lekhwiya: 0 pts).)		0–3	1–2	—	2–1
4	(Qatar) Lekhwiya	6	2	0	4	5	9	−4	6		1–0	1–0	1–2	—

Source: WorldFootball.net
Notes:
7 March 2012
18:30 UTC+03:30

Sepahan (Iran)	1–0	(United Arab Emirates) Al-Nasr
Correa 84'	Report

Foolad Shahr Stadium, Isfahan
Attendance: 6,550
Referee: Tan Hai (China PR)
7 March 2012
18:30 UTC+03:00

Lekhwiya (Qatar)	1–0	(Saudi Arabia) Al-Ahli
Nam Tae-Hee 74'	Report

Jassim bin Hamad Stadium, Al Rayyan
Attendance: 4,227
Referee: Ali Abdulnabi (Bahrain)

21 March 2012
20:00 UTC+04:00

Al-Nasr (United Arab Emirates)	2–1	(Qatar) Lekhwiya
Diané 37', 90+2'	Report	Dagano 42'

Al-Maktoum Stadium, Dubai
Attendance: 4,720
Referee: Kim Dong-Jin (Korea Republic)
21 March 2012
20:30 UTC+03:00

Al-Ahli (Saudi Arabia)	1–1	(Iran) Sepahan
Simões 90+4' (pen.)	Report	Correa 35'

Prince Abdullah al-Faisal Stadium, Jeddah
Attendance: 14,247
Referee: Valentin Kovalenko (Uzbekistan)

3 April 2012
20:00 UTC+04:30

Sepahan (Iran)	2–1	(Qatar) Lekhwiya
Hosseini 10'; Correa 89'	Report	Afif 55'

Foolad Shahr Stadium, Isfahan
Attendance: 6,732
Referee: Ryuji Sato (Japan)
3 April 2012
20:00 UTC+04:00

Al-Nasr (United Arab Emirates)	1–2	(Saudi Arabia) Al-Ahli
Diané 52'	Report	Simões 27'; Al-Jassim 50'

Al-Maktoum Stadium, Dubai
Attendance: 4,376
Referee: Minoru Tōjō (Japan)

18 April 2012
19:00 UTC+03:00

Lekhwiya (Qatar)	1–0	(Iran) Sepahan
Koné 90+1'	Report

Jassim bin Hamad Stadium, Al Rayyan
Attendance: 3,423
Referee: Malik Abdul Bashir (Singapore)
18 April 2012
20:45 UTC+03:00

Al-Ahli (Saudi Arabia)	3–1	(United Arab Emirates) Al-Nasr
Jaizawi 55'; Simões 66'; Al-Mousa 73'	Report	Diané 33'

Prince Abdullah al-Faisal Stadium, Jeddah
Attendance: 16,386
Referee: Choi Myung-Yong (Korea Republic)

1 May 2012
20:00 UTC+04:00

Al-Nasr (United Arab Emirates)	0–3	(Iran) Sepahan
	Report	Correa 44'; Sukaj 69'; Salehi 77'

Al-Maktoum Stadium, Dubai
Attendance: 2,264
Referee: Nawaf Shukralla (Bahrain)
1 May 2012
20:45 UTC+03:00

Al-Ahli (Saudi Arabia)	3–0	(Qatar) Lekhwiya
Jaizawi 9'; Simões 61'; Al-Jassim 90+1'	Report

Prince Abdullah al-Faisal Stadium, Jeddah
Attendance: 10,214
Referee: Masaaki Toma (Japan)

15 May 2012
20:30 UTC+04:30

Sepahan (Iran)	2–1	(Saudi Arabia) Al-Ahli
Sukaj 19'; Bengar 85'	Report	Al Hosni 62'

Foolad Shahr Stadium, Isfahan
Attendance: 6,371
Referee: Lee Min-Hu (Korea Republic)
15 May 2012
19:00 UTC+03:00

Lekhwiya (Qatar)	1–2	(United Arab Emirates) Al-Nasr
Diaby 38'	Report	Diané 55'; H. Abdullah 57'

Jassim bin Hamad Stadium, Al Rayyan
Attendance: 643
Referee: Ravshan Irmatov (Uzbekistan)

=== Group D ===
Pos	Team	Pld	W	D	L	GF	GA	GD	Pts	Qualification	HIL	PER	GHA	SHA
1	(Saudi Arabia) Al-Hilal	6	3	3	0	10	7	+3	12	Advance to knockout stage	—	1–1	2–1	2–1
2	(Iran) Persepolis	6	3	2	1	14	5	+9	11	Advance to knockout stage	0–1	—	1–1	6–1
3	(Qatar) Al-Gharafa	6	1	3	2	7	10	−3	6		3–3	0–3	—	2–1
4	(United Arab Emirates) Al-Shabab	6	0	2	4	5	14	−9	2		1–1	1–3	0–0	—

Source: WorldFootball.net
7 March 2012
20:00 UTC+04:00

Al-Shabab (United Arab Emirates)	0–0	(Qatar) Al-Gharafa
	Report

Maktoum Bin Rashid Al Maktoum Stadium, Dubai
Attendance: 3,542
Referee: Malik Abdul Bashir (Singapore)
7 March 2012
20:30 UTC+03:00

Al-Hilal (Saudi Arabia)	1–1	(Iran) Persepolis
Al-Shalhoub 53'	Report	Karimi 42' (pen.)

Prince Faisal bin Fahd Stadium, Riyadh
Attendance: 9,574
Referee: Lee Min-Hu (Korea Republic)

21 March 2012
17:00 UTC+04:30

Persepolis (Iran)	6–1	(United Arab Emirates) Al-Shabab
Zayed 8', 47', 53'; G. Rezaei 59'; Karimi 62' (pen.); Feshangchi 87'	Report	Ciel 56' (pen.)

Azadi Stadium, Tehran
Attendance: 82,700
Referee: Masaaki Toma (Japan)
21 March 2012
18:30 UTC+03:00

Al-Gharafa (Qatar)	3–3	(Saudi Arabia) Al-Hilal
Tardelli 44', 78'; El Assas 90+3' (pen.)	Report	Hermach 16'; El-Arabi 64'; Al-Zori 75'

Al-Gharafa Stadium, Al Rayyan
Attendance: 6,092
Referee: Nawaf Shukralla (Bahrain)

4 April 2012
19:30 UTC+04:00

Al-Shabab (United Arab Emirates)	1–1	(Saudi Arabia) Al-Hilal
Ciel 37'	Report	Yoo Byung-Soo 70'

Maktoum Bin Rashid Al Maktoum Stadium, Dubai
Attendance: 4,522
Referee: Ben Williams (Australia)
4 April 2012
18:35 UTC+03:00

Al-Gharafa (Qatar)	0–3	(Iran) Persepolis
	Report	G. Rezaei 3'; Zayed 6'; Kazemian 73'

Al-Gharafa Stadium, Al Rayyan
Attendance: 2,800
Referee: Abdullah Al Hilali (Oman)

17 April 2012
17:00 UTC+04:30

Persepolis (Iran)	1–1	(Qatar) Al-Gharafa
Karimi 85'	Report	Mubarak 90+1'

Azadi Stadium, Tehran
Attendance: 96,200
Referee: Ravshan Irmatov (Uzbekistan)
17 April 2012
20:50 UTC+03:00

Al-Hilal (Saudi Arabia)	2–1	(United Arab Emirates) Al-Shabab
El-Arabi 45', 68'	Report	Kieza 28'

Prince Faisal bin Fahd Stadium, Riyadh
Attendance: 2,118
Referee: Andre El Haddad (Lebanon)

1 May 2012
17:00 UTC+04:30

Persepolis (Iran)	0–1	(Saudi Arabia) Al-Hilal
	Report	El-Arabi 59'

Azadi Stadium, Tehran
Attendance: 73,154
Referee: Kim Dong-Jin (Korea Republic)
1 May 2012
18:50 UTC+03:00

Al-Gharafa (Qatar)	2–1	(United Arab Emirates) Al-Shabab
Dindane 81'; El Assas 83' (pen.)	Report	Mohammed 65'

Al-Gharafa Stadium, Al Rayyan
Attendance: 641
Referee: Choi Myung-Yong (Korea Republic)

15 May 2012
20:00 UTC+04:00

Al-Shabab (United Arab Emirates)	1–3	(Iran) Persepolis
Essa Obaid 7'	Report	Zayed 43'; Pooladi 52'; Badamaki 90'

Maktoum Bin Rashid Al Maktoum Stadium, Dubai
Attendance: 5,822
Referee: Tan Hai (China PR)
15 May 2012
21:00 UTC+03:00

Al-Hilal (Saudi Arabia)	2–1	(Qatar) Al-Gharafa
Al-Fraidi 48'; Al Abed 65'	Report	Hawsawi 82' (o.g.)

Prince Faisal bin Fahd Stadium, Riyadh
Attendance: 10,275
Referee: Yuichi Nishimura (Japan)

=== Group E ===
Pos	Team	Pld	W	D	L	GF	GA	GD	Pts	Qualification	ADE	BYD	POH	GMB
1	(Australia) Adelaide United	6	4	1	1	7	2	+5	13	Advance to knockout stage	—	0–0	1–0	2–0
2	(Uzbekistan) Bunyodkor	6	3	1	2	8	7	+1	10	Advance to knockout stage	1–2	—	1–0	3–2
3	(South Korea) Pohang Steelers	6	3	0	3	6	4	+2	9		1–0	0–2	—	2–0
4	(Japan) Gamba Osaka	6	1	0	5	5	13	−8	3		0–2	3–1	0–3	—

Source: WorldFootball.net
6 March 2012
19:00 UTC+09:00

Gamba Osaka (Japan)	0–3	(South Korea) Pohang Steelers
	Report	Kim Tae-Su 19'; Rendulić 22'; Asamoah 76'

Osaka Expo '70 Stadium, Osaka
Attendance: 9,101
Referee: Abdulrahman Abdou (Qatar)
6 March 2012
17:00 UTC+05:00

Bunyodkor (Uzbekistan)	1–2	(Australia) Adelaide United
Murzoev 90+4'	Report	Boogaard 12'; Golec 53'

JAR Stadium, Tashkent
Attendance: 7,000
Referee: Andre El Haddad (Lebanon)

20 March 2012
19:30 UTC+10:30

Adelaide United (Australia)	2–0	(Japan) Gamba Osaka
Mullen 17', 24'	Report

Hindmarsh Stadium, Adelaide
Attendance: 5,112
Referee: Mohamed Al Zarooni (UAE)
20 March 2012
19:30 UTC+09:00

Pohang Steelers (South Korea)	0–2	(Uzbekistan) Bunyodkor
	Report	Turaev 28'; Murzoev 77'

Pohang Steel Yard, Pohang
Attendance: 3,449
Referee: Ali Al Badwawi (UAE)

3 April 2012
19:00 UTC+09:00

Gamba Osaka (Japan)	3–1	(Uzbekistan) Bunyodkor
Endō 14'; Rafinha 58' (pen.), 82' (pen.)	Report	Soliev 88'

Osaka Expo '70 Stadium, Osaka
Attendance: 6,100
Referee: Chaiya Mahapab (Thailand)
3 April 2012
20:00 UTC+09:00

Pohang Steelers (South Korea)	1–0	(Australia) Adelaide United
Kim Dae-Ho 68'	Report

Pohang Steel Yard, Pohang
Attendance: 2,833
Referee: Khalil Al Ghamdi (Saudi Arabia)

18 April 2012
19:30 UTC+09:30

Adelaide United (Australia)	1–0	(South Korea) Pohang Steelers
Djite 90'	Report

Hindmarsh Stadium, Adelaide
Attendance: 7,659
Referee: Tan Hai (China P.R.)
18 April 2012
17:00 UTC+05:00

Bunyodkor (Uzbekistan)	3–2	(Japan) Gamba Osaka
Murzoev 14'; Turaev 42'; Soliev 84'	Report	Kurata 18'; Abe 90+3'

JAR Stadium, Tashkent
Attendance: 4,000
Referee: Khalil Al Ghamdi (Saudi Arabia)

2 May 2012
19:30 UTC+09:30

Adelaide United (Australia)	0–0	(Uzbekistan) Bunyodkor
	Report

Hindmarsh Stadium, Adelaide
Attendance: 7,794
Referee: Liu Kwok Man (Hong Kong)
2 May 2012
19:30 UTC+09:00

Pohang Steelers (South Korea)	2–0	(Japan) Gamba Osaka
Kim Jin-Yong 45+1'; Asamoah 77'	Report

Pohang Steel Yard, Pohang
Attendance: 3,825
Referee: Alireza Faghani (Iran)

16 May 2012
19:00 UTC+09:00

Gamba Osaka (Japan)	0–2	(Australia) Adelaide United
	Report	van Dijk 65'; Sato 88' (o.g.)

Osaka Expo '70 Stadium, Osaka
Attendance: 7,294
Referee: Nawaf Shukralla (Bahrain)
16 May 2012
17:00 UTC+05:00

Bunyodkor (Uzbekistan)	1–0	(South Korea) Pohang Steelers
Gafurov 48'	Report

JAR Stadium, Tashkent
Attendance: 5,100
Referee: Abdullah Balideh (Qatar)

=== Group F ===
Pos	Team	Pld	W	D	L	GF	GA	GD	Pts	Qualification	ULS	TOK	BBR	BEG
1	(South Korea) Ulsan Hyundai	6	4	2	0	11	7	+4	14	Advance to knockout stage	—	1–0	1–1	2–1
2	(Japan) FC Tokyo	6	3	2	1	12	6	+6	11	Advance to knockout stage	2–2	—	4–2	3–0
3	(Australia) Brisbane Roar	6	0	3	3	6	11	−5	3 (Note: Brisbane Roar and Beijing Guoan are tied on their head-to-head record (2 pts, 0 GD, 2 GF), overall goal difference and overall goals scored, and so are ranked by their fair play record (Brisbane Roar: 12 pts; Beijing Guoan: 18 pts).)		1–2	0–2	—	1–1
4	(China) Beijing Guoan	6	0	3	3	6	11	−5	3		2–3	1–1	1–1	—

Source: WorldFootball.net
Notes:
6 March 2012
19:30 UTC+10:00

Brisbane Roar (Australia)	0–2	(Japan) FC Tokyo
	Report	Yazawa 45+1'; Hasegawa 55'

Suncorp Stadium, Brisbane
Attendance: 12,037
Referee: Valentin Kovalenko (Uzbekistan)
6 March 2012
19:30 UTC+09:00

Ulsan Hyundai (South Korea)	2–1	(China) Beijing Guoan
Kim Shin-Wook 26'; Go Seul-Ki 34'	Report	Piao Cheng 51'

Ulsan Munsu Football Stadium, Ulsan
Attendance: 1,515
Referee: Mohamed Al Zarooni (UAE)

20 March 2012
14:00 UTC+09:00

FC Tokyo (Japan)	2–2	(South Korea) Ulsan Hyundai
Tokunaga 37'; Kajiyama 83'	Report	Kim Seung-Yong 80'; Maranhão 88'

National Olympic Stadium, Tokyo
Attendance: 14,110
Referee: Ravshan Irmatov (Uzbekistan)
20 March 2012
19:30 UTC+08:00

Beijing Guoan (China)	1–1	(Australia) Brisbane Roar
Piao Cheng 7'	Report	Nichols 20'

Workers Stadium, Beijing
Attendance: 41,000
Referee: Abdulrahman Abdou (Qatar)

4 April 2012
19:30 UTC+09:00

Ulsan Hyundai (South Korea)	1–1	(Australia) Brisbane Roar
Lee Jae-Seong 54'	Report	Fitzgerald 36'

Ulsan Munsu Football Stadium, Ulsan
Attendance: 1,673
Referee: Andre El Haddad (Lebanon)
4 April 2012
20:00 UTC+08:00

Beijing Guoan (China)	1–1	(Japan) FC Tokyo
Wang Xiaolong 10' (pen.)	Report	Hasegawa 44'

Workers Stadium, Beijing
Attendance: 31,256
Referee: Saeid Mozaffarizadeh (Iran)

17 April 2012
19:30 UTC+10:00

Brisbane Roar (Australia)	1–2	(South Korea) Ulsan Hyundai
Stefanutto 25'	Report	Vélez 11'; Kwak Tae-Hwi 73' (pen.)

Suncorp Stadium, Brisbane
Attendance: 7,200
Referee: Mohsen Torky (Iran)
17 April 2012
19:30 UTC+09:00

FC Tokyo (Japan)	3–0	(China) Beijing Guoan
Watanabe 7'; Otake 45+1'; Yazawa 57'	Report

Ajinomoto Stadium, Tokyo
Attendance: 9,537
Referee: Ali Abdulnabi (Bahrain)

2 May 2012
19:30 UTC+09:00

FC Tokyo (Japan)	4–2	(Australia) Brisbane Roar
Takahashi 5'; Mukuhara 20'; Watanabe 44' (pen.), 60'	Report	Berisha 4'; Broich 33'

National Olympic Stadium, Tokyo
Attendance: 8,492
Referee: Abdullah Balideh (Qatar)
2 May 2012
19:30 UTC+08:00

Beijing Guoan (China)	2–3	(South Korea) Ulsan Hyundai
Zhang Xizhe 47'; Shao Jiayi 90+2'	Report	Kim Shin-Wook 17'; Kim Seung-Yong 20'; Maranhão 79'

Workers Stadium, Beijing
Attendance: 21,692
Referee: Abdullah Al Hilali (Oman)

16 May 2012
19:30 UTC+10:00

Brisbane Roar (Australia)	1–1	(China) Beijing Guoan
Berisha 15'	Report	Li Hanbo 34'

Suncorp Stadium, Brisbane
Attendance: 5,615
Referee: Ali Al Badwawi (UAE)
16 May 2012
19:30 UTC+09:00

Ulsan Hyundai (South Korea)	1–0	(Japan) FC Tokyo
Kang Min-Soo 37'	Report

Ulsan Munsu Football Stadium, Ulsan
Attendance: 5,746
Referee: Khalil Al Ghamdi (Saudi Arabia)

=== Group G ===
Pos	Team	Pld	W	D	L	GF	GA	GD	Pts	Qualification	SIC	NGY	CCM	TTD
1	(South Korea) Seongnam Ilhwa Chunma	6	2	4	0	13	5	+8	10 (Note: Seongnam Ilhwa Chunma and Nagoya Grampus are tied on their head-to-head record (2 pts, 0 GD, 3 GF), and so are ranked by their overall goal difference.)	Advance to knockout stage	—	1–1	5–0	1–1
2	(Japan) Nagoya Grampus	6	2	4	0	10	4	+6	10	Advance to knockout stage	2–2	—	3–0	0–0
3	(Australia) Central Coast Mariners	6	1	3	2	7	11	−4	6		1–1	1–1	—	5–1
4	(China) Tianjin Teda	6	0	3	3	2	12	−10	3		0–3	0–3	0–0	—

Source: WorldFootball.net
Notes:
7 March 2012
19:00 UTC+09:00

Nagoya Grampus (Japan)	2–2	(South Korea) Seongnam Ilhwa Chunma
Kennedy 58' (pen.); Kanazaki 74'	Report	Héverton 47', 90+3'

Mizuho Athletic Stadium, Nagoya
Attendance: 6,686
Referee: Nawaf Shukralla (Bahrain)
7 March 2012
20:00 UTC+08:00

Tianjin Teda (China)	0–0	(Australia) Central Coast Mariners
	Report

TEDA Football Stadium, Tianjin
Attendance: 19,800
Referee: Abdullah Al Hilali (Oman)

21 March 2012
19:30 UTC+11:00

Central Coast Mariners (Australia)	1–1	(Japan) Nagoya Grampus
Zwaanswijk 28'	Report	Tulio 21'

Central Coast Stadium, Gosford
Attendance: 5,130
Referee: Liu Kwok Man (Hong Kong)
21 March 2012
19:00 UTC+09:00

Seongnam Ilhwa Chunma (South Korea)	1–1	(China) Tianjin Teda
Han Sang-Woon 14'	Report	Goian 69'

Tancheon Sports Complex, Seongnam
Attendance: 2,553
Referee: Abdullah Balideh (Qatar)

3 April 2012
19:00 UTC+10:00

Central Coast Mariners (Australia)	1–1	(South Korea) Seongnam Ilhwa Chunma
Kwasnik 50'	Report	Santos 57'

Central Coast Stadium, Gosford
Attendance: 5,018
Referee: Valentin Kovalenko (Uzbekistan)
3 April 2012
19:30 UTC+08:00

Tianjin Teda (China)	0–3	(Japan) Nagoya Grampus
	Report	Fujimoto 24'; Tamada 49'; Nagai 73'

TEDA Football Stadium, Tianjin
Attendance: 12,249
Referee: Ravshan Irmatov (Uzbekistan)

18 April 2012
19:00 UTC+09:00

Nagoya Grampus (Japan)	0–0	(China) Tianjin Teda
	Report

Mizuho Athletic Stadium, Nagoya
Attendance: 6,006
Referee: Liu Kwok Man (Hong Kong)
18 April 2012
19:30 UTC+09:00

Seongnam Ilhwa Chunma (South Korea)	5–0	(Australia) Central Coast Mariners
Lee Chang-Hoon 39'; Santos 43', 73' (pen.); Kim Sung-hwan 69'; Jovančić 84'	Report

Tancheon Sports Complex, Seongnam
Attendance: 2,017
Referee: Saeid Mozaffarizadeh (Iran)

1 May 2012
19:30 UTC+10:00

Central Coast Mariners (Australia)	5–1	(China) Tianjin Teda
McBreen 10', 20'; Rose 48'; McGlinchey 71'; Amini 85'	Report	Liao Bochao 72'

Central Coast Stadium, Gosford
Attendance: 4,155
Referee: Mohamed Al Zarooni (UAE)
1 May 2012
19:30 UTC+09:00

Seongnam Ilhwa Chunma (South Korea)	1–1	(Japan) Nagoya Grampus
Han Sang-Woon 12'	Report	Park Jin-Po 72' (o.g.)

Tancheon Sports Complex, Seongnam
Attendance: 6,379
Referee: Ali Al Badwawi (UAE)

15 May 2012
19:00 UTC+09:00

Nagoya Grampus (Japan)	3–0	(Australia) Central Coast Mariners
Tamada 19'; Fujimoto 36'; Tulio 87'	Report

Mizuho Athletic Stadium, Nagoya
Attendance: 5,037
Referee: Abdulrahman Abdou (Qatar)
15 May 2012
19:30 UTC+08:00

Tianjin Teda (China)	0–3	(South Korea) Seongnam Ilhwa Chunma
	Report	Yoon Bit-Garam 32'; Jovančić 48', 69' (pen.)

TEDA Football Stadium, Tianjin
Attendance: 0
Referee: Alireza Faghani (Iran)

=== Group H ===
Pos	Team	Pld	W	D	L	GF	GA	GD	Pts	Qualification	GEG	KSR	JHM	BRU
1	(China) Guangzhou Evergrande	6	3	1	2	12	8	+4	10 (Note: Guangzhou Evergrande and Kashiwa Reysol are ranked by their head-to-head record (Guangzhou Evergrande: 4 pts; Kashiwa Reysol: 1 pt).)	Advance to knockout stage	—	3–1	1–3	1–2
2	(Japan) Kashiwa Reysol	6	3	1	2	11	7	+4	10	Advance to knockout stage	0–0	—	5–1	1–0
3	(South Korea) Jeonbuk Hyundai Motors	6	3	0	3	10	15	−5	9		1–5	0–2	—	3–2
4	(Thailand) Buriram United	6	2	0	4	8	11	−3	6		1–2	3–2	0–2	—

Source: WorldFootball.net
Notes:
7 March 2012
19:00 UTC+09:00

Jeonbuk Hyundai Motors (South Korea)	1–5	(China) Guangzhou Evergrande
Jeong Shung-hoon 70'	Report	Cléo 27', 69'; Conca 41', 73'; Muriqui 76'

Jeonju World Cup Stadium, Jeonju
Attendance: 7,978
Referee: Saeid Mozaffarizadeh (Iran)
7 March 2012
18:30 UTC+07:00

Buriram United (Thailand)	3–2	(Japan) Kashiwa Reysol
Jirawat 10', 77'; Jadigerov 38'	Report	Tanaka 55'; Sakai 64'

Buriram Stadium, Buriram
Attendance: 15,089
Referee: Ravshan Irmatov (Uzbekistan)

21 March 2012
19:00 UTC+09:00

Kashiwa Reysol (Japan)	5–1	(South Korea) Jeonbuk Hyundai Motors
Nasu 40'; Leandro Domingues 45' (pen.), 45+1'; Tanaka 89'; Barada 90+3'	Report	Huang Bowen 51'

Hitachi Kashiwa Soccer Stadium, Kashiwa
Attendance: 8,175
Referee: Peter Green (Australia)
21 March 2012
20:00 UTC+08:00

Guangzhou Evergrande (China)	1–2	(Thailand) Buriram United
Cléo 69'	Report	Suchao 61' (pen.); Acheampong 79'

Tianhe Stadium, Guangzhou
Attendance: 38,512
Referee: Andre El Haddad (Lebanon)

4 April 2012
19:00 UTC+09:00

Kashiwa Reysol (Japan)	0–0	(China) Guangzhou Evergrande
	Report

Hitachi Kashiwa Soccer Stadium, Kashiwa
Attendance: 8,787
Referee: Ali Al Badwawi (UAE)
4 April 2012
18:30 UTC+07:00

Buriram United (Thailand)	0–2	(South Korea) Jeonbuk Hyundai Motors
	Report	Lee Seung-hyun 9'; Seo Sang-min 34'

Buriram Stadium, Buriram
Attendance: 22,770
Referee: Nawaf Shukralla (Bahrain)

17 April 2012
19:00 UTC+09:00

Jeonbuk Hyundai Motors (South Korea)	3–2	(Thailand) Buriram United
Lee Dong-gook 25', 27'; Park Won-jae 80'	Report	Ohandza 20', 56'

Jeonju World Cup Stadium, Jeonju
Attendance: 6,432
Referee: Mohamed Al Zarooni (UAE)
17 April 2012
19:30 UTC+08:00

Guangzhou Evergrande (China)	3–1	(Japan) Kashiwa Reysol
Conca 29' (pen.); Muriqui 58', 84'	Report	Sakai 50'

Tianhe Stadium, Guangzhou
Attendance: 40,000
Referee: Abdulrahman Abdou (Qatar)

1 May 2012
19:00 UTC+09:00

Kashiwa Reysol (Japan)	1–0	(Thailand) Buriram United
Leandro Domingues 24'	Report

Hitachi Kashiwa Soccer Stadium, Kashiwa
Attendance: 8,099
Referee: Khalil Al Ghamdi (Saudi Arabia)
1 May 2012
19:30 UTC+08:00

Guangzhou Evergrande (China)	1–3	(South Korea) Jeonbuk Hyundai Motors
Conca 10' (pen.)	Report	Lee Seung-hyun 43'; Lee Dong-gook 90+1', 90+3' (pen.)

Tianhe Stadium, Guangzhou
Attendance: 47,869
Referee: Valentin Kovalenko (Uzbekistan)

15 May 2012
19:00 UTC+09:00

Jeonbuk Hyundai Motors (South Korea)	0–2	(Japan) Kashiwa Reysol
	Report	Leandro Domingues 49'; Tanaka 62'

Jeonju World Cup Stadium, Jeonju
Attendance: 11,459
Referee: Ali Abdulnabi (Bahrain)
15 May 2012
18:30 UTC+07:00

Buriram United (Thailand)	1–2	(China) Guangzhou Evergrande
Suriya 57'	Report	Gao Lin 49'; Conca 90+1' (pen.)

Buriram Stadium, Buriram
Attendance: 18,000
Referee: Strebre Delovski (Australia)
