= Park Se-young (disambiguation) =

- Hangul: 박세영
- RR: Bak Seyeong
- MR: Pak Seyŏng

Park Se-young is a Korean name consisting of the family name Park (Pak, Bak) and the given name Se-young (Se-yeong, Se-yong). It may refer to:

- Park Se-young (born 1988), a South Korean actress
- Park Se-young (footballer) (born 1989), a South Korean footballer
- Park Se-yeong (born 1993), a South Korean short track speed skater
- Pak Se-yong (1902–1989), a North Korean poet
