= 2012 AFC Champions League qualifying play-off =

Association football tournament

The 2012 AFC Champions League qualifying play-off was contested by nine teams (five from West Zone, four from East Zone).

The draw for the qualifying play-off was held at the AFC house in Kuala Lumpur, Malaysia on 6 December 2011, 15:00 UTC+08:00. The draw, without any seeding or country protection, determined the brackets as well as host of each play-off match. The semi-final round was played on 10 February 2012, and the final round was played 16 and 18 February 2012.

Extra time and penalty shootout would be used to decide the winner if necessary. The four winners of the final round (two from West Zone, two from East Zone) advanced to the group stage to join the 28 teams which directly entered the group stage. The three losers of the final round (two from West Zone, one from East zone) advanced to the 2012 AFC Cup group stage, except the loser of the match between Adelaide United and Persipura Jayapura.

== Matches ==
=== West Zone ===
Team 1	Score	Team 2
Semi-final Round
Esteghlal (Iran)	2–0	(Iran) Zob Ahan
Final Round
Al-Shabab (United Arab Emirates)	3–0	(Uzbekistan) Neftchi Farg'ona
Esteghlal (Iran)	3–1	(Saudi Arabia) Al-Ettifaq

==== Semi-final round ====
10 February 2012
17:15 UTC+03:30

Esteghlal (Iran)	2–0	(Iran) Zob Ahan
Heyrdari 23'; Borhani 67'	Report

Azadi Stadium, Tehran
Attendance: 33,750
Referee: Minoru Tōjō (Japan)

==== Final round ====
18 February 2012
17:20 UTC+03:30

Esteghlal (Iran)	3–1	(Saudi Arabia) Al-Ettifaq
Jerković 37'; Heydari 62'; Borhani 65'	Report	Al-Salem 59'

Azadi Stadium, Tehran
Attendance: 61,120
Referee: Valentin Kovalenko (Uzbekistan)

18 February 2012
20:00 UTC+04:00

Al-Shabab (United Arab Emirates)	3–0	(Uzbekistan) Neftchi Farg'ona
Obaid 6', 60'; Haydarov 90+3'	Report

Maktoum Bin Rashid Al Maktoum Stadium, Dubai
Attendance: 2,000
Referee: Mohsen Torky (Iran)

=== East Zone ===
Team 1	Score	Team 2
Final Round
Pohang Steelers (South Korea)	2–0	(Thailand) Chonburi
Adelaide United (Australia)	3–0	(Indonesia) Persipura Jayapura

The following team was also slated to enter the qualifying play-off in the East Zone, but did not enter the competition:

- (China) Liaoning Whowin

==== Final round ====
16 February 2012
19:30 UTC+10:30

Adelaide United (Australia)	3–0	(Indonesia) Persipura Jayapura
Boogaard 12'; Levchenko 57' van Dijk 84'	Report

Hindmarsh Stadium, Adelaide
Attendance: 5,013
Referee: Masaaki Toma (Japan)

18 February 2012
15:30 UTC+09:00

Pohang Steelers (South Korea)	2–0	(Thailand) Chonburi
Hwang Jin-Sung 28'; Park Sung-Ho 70'	Report

Pohang Steel Yard, Pohang
Attendance: 5,344
Referee: Peter Green (Australia)
