= Se-young =

- Hangul: 세영
- RR: Seyeong
- MR: Seyŏng

Se-young, also spelled Sei-young, Se-yeong or Se-yong, is a Korean given name.

People with this name include:

- Pak Se-yong (1902–1989), North Korean poet and politician
- Lloyd Lee (born Lloyd Seyoung Lee, 1976), American former football coach
- Kim Se-young (born 1981), South Korean professional volleyball player
- Park Se-young (born 1988), South Korean actress
- Lee Se-young (comedian) (born 1989), South Korean comedian and actress
- Park Se-young (footballer) (born 1989), South Korean football player
- Lee Se-young (born 1992), South Korean actress
- Kim Sei-young (born 1993), South Korean professional golfer
- Park Se-yeong (born 1993), South Korean short track speed skater
- An Se-young (born 2002), South Korean badminton player

== See also ==
- List of Korean given names
