= Essa Obaid (footballer) =

Emirati footballer (born 1984)

Personal information
- Full name: Essa Obaid Hassan Hirok
- Date of birth: 10 April 1984 (age 42)
- Place of birth: United Arab Emirates
- Height: 1.83 m (6 ft 0 in)
- Position: Striker

Youth career
- Al-Shabab

Senior career*
Years	Team	Apps	(Gls)
2005–2016	Al-Shabab		
2016–2018	Hatta		

International career
2011–2012	United Arab Emirates	3	(1)
- * Club domestic league appearances and goals as of 25 January 2012

Essa Obaid Hassan Hirok or Essa Obaid (born 10 April 1984) in the United Arab Emirates is an Association footballer currently playing as a striker . He has also represented the UAE at international level.

== Career ==
Obaid made an important impact in Al-Shabab's 2012 AFC Champions League campaign when he scored 2 goals in his team's 3–0 over Uzbekistan club Neftchi to qualify for the Group Stage.

== International career ==
Obaid made his debut for the national team during the 2014 FIFA World Cup Qualification match against South Korea.
