= Daniel Goumou =

Guinean footballer (born 1990)

Personal information
- Full name: Daniel Goumou
- Date of birth: 10 April 1990 (age 36)
- Place of birth: Conakry, Guinea
- Height: 1.71 m (5 ft 7 1/2 in)
- Position: Midfielder

Youth career
- 2006: Falcon College
- 2007–2008: ASPIRE

Senior career*
Years	Team	Apps	(Gls)
2009–2019	Al Rayyan	148	(4)
2019–2020	Al-Sailiya	7	(0)
2020–2021	Al-Kharaitiyat	14	(0)
2021–2022	Al-Markhiya		
- * Club domestic league appearances and goals

Daniel Goumou (born 10 April 1990) is a Guinean footballer who plays as a midfielder.

== Career ==
Goumou began his career with Falcon College, before moving to the ASPIRE Academy for Sports Excellence in 2006. Aged 18, he left Conakry for Morocco. After just 3 months he moved to Qatar in 2008. In February 2009, he joined Al Rayyan. In the 2011–12 season of the Qatar Stars League, Goma racked up a record number of yellow cards since the beginning of the league, with 7 yellow cards in 9 appearances.

== International career ==
Goumou has played for the Qatar Olympic football team in the 2010 Asian Games in China.

== Honours ==
- Emir of Qatar Cup
  - Winner (1): 2011 with Al Rayyan SC.
