= Jeon Woo-young =

South Korean footballer

Personal information
- Full name: Jeon Woo-young
- Date of birth: 27 December 1987 (age 38)
- Place of birth: South Korea
- Height: 1.81 m (5 ft 11 1/2 in)
- Position: Midfielder

Youth career
- 2003–2005: Changwon Machine Technical; High School
- 2007–2010: Kwangwoon University

Senior career*
Years	Team	Apps	(Gls)
2006	Changwon City	7	(0)
2011–2013	Seongnam Ilhwa	28	(3)
2013–2015	Busan IPark	52	(0)
2016	Jeonnam Dragons	9	(0)
2017–2018	Melaka United	19	(6)
2018	PS TIRA	14	(0)

International career
- South Korea U-20
- * Club domestic league appearances and goals as of 9 December 2018

- Jeon Woo-young
- Hangul: 전우영
- RR: Jeon Uyeong
- MR: Chŏn Uyŏng

Former name
- Hangul: 전성찬
- Hanja: 全成贊
- RR: Jeon Seongchan
- MR: Chŏn Sŏngch'an

Jeon Woo-young (born 27 December 1987) is a South Korean footballer who plays as a central midfielder. His name Jeon Sung-chan is renamed Jeon Woo-young in January 2016.

== Club career ==
Jeon transferred from Seongnam in the summer of 2013. He made his debut for IPark on 31 July in a game against Suwon after recovering from an injury which kept him out for over a year. In the second half of the 2014 K League Classic season, Jeon became a regular starter in the heart of IPark's midfield as they went ten games unbeaten to avoid relegation. He transferred to Jeonnam Dragons following IPark's relegation at the end of the 2015 season.

In 2017, he moved to Malaysian's club Melaka United following the departure of Omid Nazari.

== Club career statistics ==
As of 6 December 2015

Club performance			League		Cup		League Cup		Play-offs		Total	
Season	Club	League	Apps	Goals	Apps	Goals	Apps	Goals	Apps	Goals	Apps	Goals
South Korea			League		KFA Cup		League Cup		Play-offs		Total	
2011	Seongnam Ilhwa	K League	22	3	0	0	2	0	-	-	24	3
2012	Seongnam Ilhwa	K League	6	0	0	0	0	0	-	-	6	0
2013	Seongnam Ilhwa	KL Classic	0	0	0	0	-	-	-	-	0	0
2013	Busan IPark	KL Classic	11	0	1	0	-	-	-	-	12	0
2014	Busan IPark	KL Classic	17	0	2	0	-	-	-	-	19	0
2015	Busan IPark	KL Classic	24	0	0	0	-	-	1	0	25	0
Career total			80	3	3	0	2	0	1	0	86	3
