= Kim Pyung-rae =

South Korean footballer

Kim Pyung-Rae
Personal information
- Full name: Kim Pyung-Rae
- Date of birth: 9 November 1987 (age 39)
- Place of birth: South Korea
- Height: 1.82 m (6 ft 0 in)
- Position: Midfielder

Youth career
- 2006–2008: Chung-Ang University

Senior career*
Years	Team	Apps	(Gls)
2009–2010	Metalurh Zaporizhzhia	7	(0)
2011–2014	Seongnam FC	62	(0)
2015–2019	Jeonnam Dragons	31	(0)
2017–2018	→ Cheongju City (loan)	0	(0)
2019	Samut Prakan City	13	(0)
- * Club domestic league appearances and goals

Kim Pyung-Rae (Korean: 김평래; 9 November 1987) is a South Korean football midfielder.

== Career ==
He started his professional football career in Ukrainian Premier League side Metalurh Zaporizhzhia. Kim made his debut for Metalurh Zaporizhzhia on 2 August 2009 against Illichivets after coming on as a substitute at the 65 minute.
