= Yun Young-sun =

South Korean footballer (born 1988)

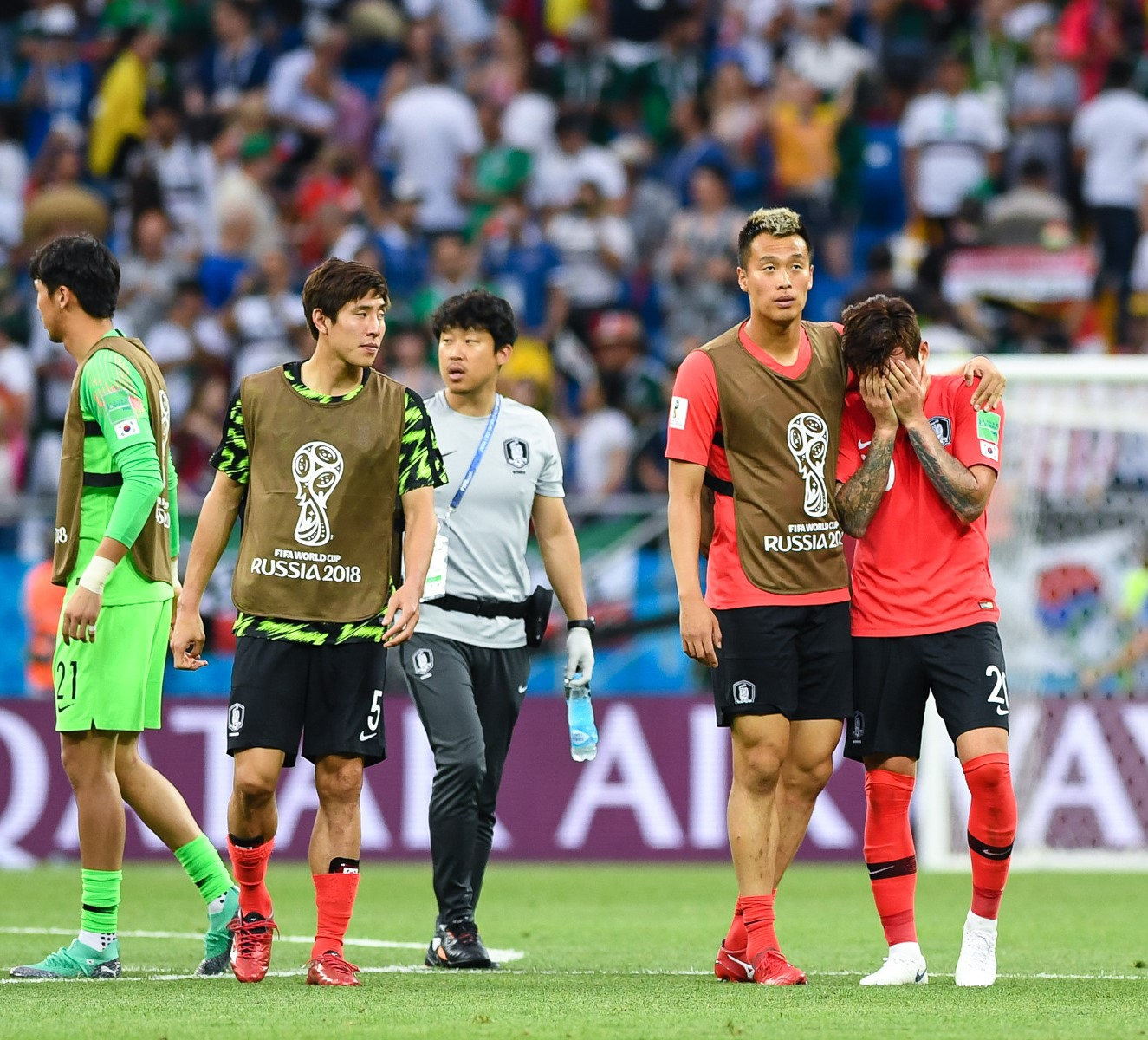
- Yun with South Korea at the 2018 FIFA World Cup

Personal information
- Date of birth: 4 October 1988 (age 38)
- Place of birth: South Korea
- Height: 1.86 m (6 ft 1 in)
- Position: Centre back

Youth career
- 2004–2006: Baegam High School
- 2007–2009: Dankook University

Senior career*
Years	Team	Apps	(Gls)
2010–2018	Seongnam FC	178	(6)
2016–2018	→ Sangju Sangmu (army)	26	(0)
2019–2020	Ulsan Hyundai	27	(0)
2020	→ FC Seoul (loan)	9	(0)
2021–2022	Suwon FC	6	(0)
2022–2023	Jeonbuk Hyundai Motors	21	(0)
2024	Seongnam FC	13	(0)

International career^{‡}
2009	South Korea Universiade	6	(1)
2015–2018	South Korea	7	(0)
- * Club domestic league appearances and goals as of 30 September 2023 ‡ National team caps and goals as of 27 June 2018

- Yun Young-sun
- Hangul: 윤영선
- Hanja: 尹榮善
- RR: Yun Yeongseon
- MR: Yun Yŏngsŏn

Yun Young-sun (Korean: 윤영선; born 4 October 1988) is a South Korean former footballer who played as centre back.

== Club career ==
Yun was drafted in the 2010 K-League Draft by Seongnam Ilhwa Chunma. On 9 March 2010, Yun made his professional debut AFC Champions League against Melbourne Victory, scoring Seongnam's second goal in away won 2–0. Yun made his K-League debut on 19 March away against Jeonbuk Hyundai Motors, coming on as substitute for Kim Jin-yong in the 72nd minutes. He was linked with Chinese Super League side Henan Jianye in January 2014, however, his transfer was blocked after failing to pass the physical examination.

== Club career statistics ==
As of 30 October 2022

Club performance			League		FA Cup		Continental		Other^{1}		Total	
Season	Club	League	Apps	Goals	Apps	Goals	Apps	Goals	Apps	Goals	Apps	Goals
2010	Seongnam FC	K League 1	5	0	2	0	4 (Note: Three appearances and one goal in AFC Champions League, one appearance in FIFA Club World Cup)	1	0	0	11	1
2011	Seongnam FC	K League 1	16	0	1	0	-		2 (Note: K League Cup)	0	19	0
2012	Seongnam FC	K League 1	34	0	1	0	6	0	-		41	0
2013	Seongnam FC	K League 1	36	2	2	0	-		-		38	2
2014	Seongnam FC	K League 1	19	0	4	0	-		-		23	0
2015	Seongnam FC	K League 1	35	2	1	0	6	0	-		42	2
2016	Seongnam FC	K League 1	16	1	0	0	-		-		16	1
2016	Sangju Sangmu (army)	K League 1	6	0	0	0	-		-		6	0
2017	Sangju Sangmu (army)	K League 1	17	0	0	0	-		2 (Note: K League Promotion-Relegation Playoffs)	0	19	0
2018	Sangju Sangmu (army)	K League 1	3	0	0	0	-		-		3	0
2018	Seongnam FC	K League 2	17	1	0	0	-		-		17	1
2019	Ulsan Hyundai	K League 1	27	0	1	0	7	0	-		34	0
2020	FC Seoul (loan)	K League 1	9	0	1	0	5	0	-		15	0
2021	Suwon FC	K League 1	6	0	0	0	-		-		6	0
2022	Jeonbuk Hyundai Motors	K League 1	20	0	3	0	7	0	-		30	0
2023	Jeonbuk Hyundai Motors	K League 1	0	0	0	0	0	0	-		6	0
Career total			266	6	16	0	35	1	4	0	321	7

^{1}Includes League Cup and Playoffs.

== International career ==
In May 2018 he was named in South Korea's preliminary 28 man squad for the 2018 FIFA World Cup in Russia.

== Honors ==
=== Club ===
Seongnam Ilhwa Chunma / Seongnam FC

- AFC Champions League: 2010
- FA Cup: 2011, 2014

Jeonbuk Hyundai Motors

- FA Cup: 2022

=== International ===
South Korea

- EAFF East Asian Cup: 2017
