= Sim Jae-myung =

South Korean footballer

Sim Jae-Myung
Personal information
- Date of birth: 7 June 1989 (age 37)
- Place of birth: South Korea
- Height: 1.81 m (5 ft 11 1/2 in)
- Position: Forward

Youth career
- 2005–2007: Seongnam Ilhwa U-18
- 2008–2010: Chung-Ang University

Senior career*
Years	Team	Apps	(Gls)
2011–2012	Seongnam Ilhwa	7	(0)
- * Club domestic league appearances and goals as of 30 November 2012

- Sim Jae-myung
- Hangul: 심재명
- Hanja: 沈載明
- RR: Sim Jaemyeong
- MR: Sim Chaemyŏng

Sim Jae-Myung (Korean: 심재명; born 7 June 1989) is a South Korean footballer who plays as forward.

== Club career ==
Sim attended Pungsaeng High School (Seongnam U-18 Team). He started his professional career with the Seongnam Ilhwa Chunma. Sim made his debut in a 1–1 away draw over Pohang Steelers on 5 March 2011.
