= Ha Kang-jin =

South Korean footballer

Ha Kang-Jin
Personal information
- Full name: Ha Kang-Jin
- Date of birth: 30 January 1989 (age 37)
- Place of birth: Gochang, South Korea
- Height: 1.93 m (6 ft 4 in)
- Position: Goalkeeper

Youth career
- 2008–2009: Soongsil University

Senior career*
| Years | Team | Apps | (Gls) |
| 2010 | Suwon Bluewings | 14 | (0) |
| 2011–2012 | Seongnam Ilhwa | 50 | (0) |
| 2013 | Gyeongnam FC | 7 | (0) |
| 2014 | Bucheon FC 1995 | 13 | (0) |
| 2015 | Gangneung City | 12 | (0) |
| 2016 | Gyeongnam FC | 8 | (0) |
| 2017 | Gimhae | 27 | (0) |
- * Club domestic league appearances and goals as of 6 May 2018

- Ha Kang-jin
- Hangul: 하강진
- Hanja: 河康鎭
- RR: Ha Gangjin
- MR: Ha Kangjin

Ha Kang-Jin (Korean: 하강진; born 30 January 1989) is a South Korean football goalkeeper who most recently played for Korea National League side Gimhae FC.

== Honors ==
Seongnam Ilhwa Chunma

- 2011 FA Cup Winner
