= Héverton (footballer, born 1985) =

Brazilian footballer

Personal information
- Full name: Héverton Durães Coutinho Alves
- Date of birth: 28 October 1985 (age 41)
- Place of birth: Brasília, Brazil
- Height: 1.73 m (5 ft 8 in)
- Position: Attacking midfielder

Senior career*
Years	Team	Apps	(Gls)
1999–2004	Guarani		
2004–2005	Ankaragücü	7	(1)
2006	União Barbarense		
2007	Ponte Preta		
2007–2008	Corinthians	9	(0)
2008	Vitória	2	(0)
2008–2013	Portuguesa	68	(24)
2011	→ Atlético Paranaense (loan)	0	(0)
2011–2012	→ Seongnam (loan)	29	(7)
2014	Paysandu	13	(2)
2015	Brasília	0	(0)
2016	XV de Piracicaba	3	(0)
- * Club domestic league appearances and goals

Héverton Durães Coutinho Alves (born 28 October 1985), commonly known as Héverton, is a Brazilian former professional footballer who played as an attacking midfielder.

== Career ==
Héverton was born in Brasília, Distrito Federal, Brazil. His career started in 1999 with Guarani, he stayed with the club until 2004 when he left to join Turkish club Ankaragücü. He made 7 league appearances for Ankaragücü and scored one goal before returning to Brazil to sign for União Barbarense. Next came a move to Ponte Preta, before Héverton joined Corinthians in 2007 where he played nine times. In 2008, he signed for Vitória but made just two appearances before leaving.

Following his departure from Vitória, he completed a transfer to Portuguesa. Héverton's seventh club was his most successful move to date as he made 68 appearances and scored 24 goals in the space of five years. His best season for Portuguesa came in 2010, he began it by scoring 11 times in the club's 2010 Campeonato Paulista campaign and continued his fine form into the following Série B season where he scored 12 goals in 32 matches. 2011 also started well for Héverton as he scored three goals in six Campeonato Paulista games, this preceded a loan move to Atlético Paranaense. He scored once in five Paulista matches for Atlético Paranaense before returning to Portuguesa.

Shortly after returning to Portuguesa, Héverton was again on his way out on loan as he agreed to join Korean club Seongnam on loan until June 2012. He made his K League Classic debut on 16 July 2011 in a match against Jeju United where he also opened the scoring in the 19th minute, the match ended 2–2. He went on to make 12 appearances in total for Seongnam whilst scoring an impressive six goals from midfield. Seongnam finished the season in 10th but qualified for the 2012 AFC Champions League as winners of the 2011 Korean FA Cup. In the club's 2012 Champions League run, Héverton scored twice (both against Nagoya Grampus) in five appearances as Seongnam qualified for the Round of 16 before getting eliminated by Bunyodkor. He made seven further appearances in all competitions for Seongnam before going back to his parent club Portuguesa.

Back with Portuguesa, he made 15 appearances and scored once to end the year with Portuguesa. 29 appearances (including one in the 2013 Copa Sudamericana) and 2 goals followed for the club in the 2013 season as the club won the 2013 Campeonato Paulista Série A2 before Héverton left to join Paysandu where he made 18 appearances and scored 4 goals during 2014. In 2015, Héverton joined Brasília. He played three matches in the 2015 Copa Verde and two in the 2015 Copa do Brasil before departing and subsequently joining Piracicaba in 2016. He participated in three games before being released in April 2016.

== Honours ==
Seongnam

- Korean FA Cup: 2011

Portuguesa

- Campeonato Paulista Série A2: 2013
