= Lim Jong-eun =

South Korean footballer (born 1990)

Lim Jong-Eun
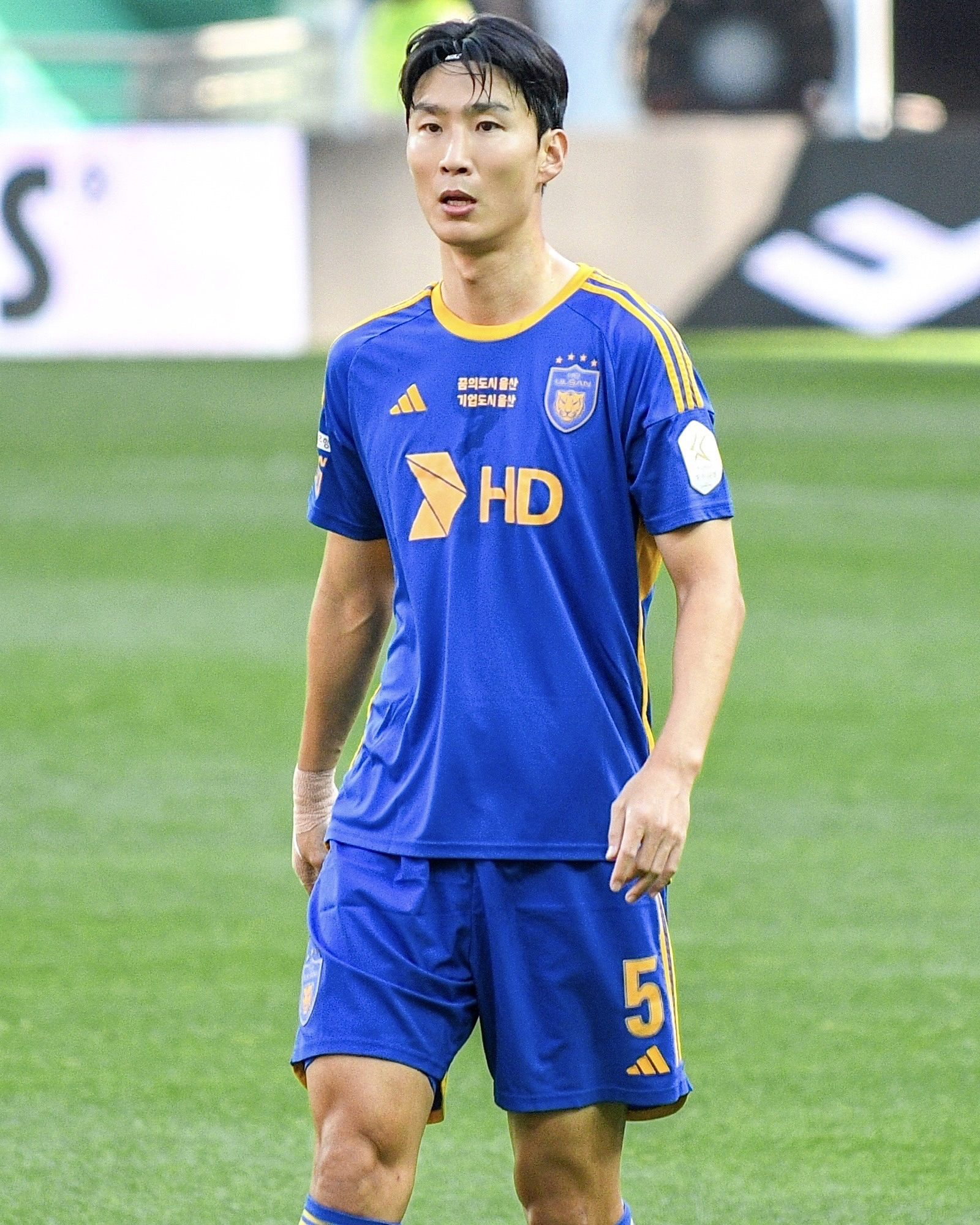
- Lim in 2024

Personal information
- Full name: Lim Jong-Eun
- Date of birth: 18 June 1990 (age 36)
- Place of birth: Incheon, South Korea
- Height: 1.93 m (6 ft 4 in)
- Position: Centre back

Team information
- Current team: Daejeon
- Number: 5

Senior career*
Years	Team	Apps	(Gls)
2009–2011	Ulsan Hyundai	15	(0)
2012	Seongnam Ilhwa Chunma	38	(2)
2013–2015	Jeonnam Dragons	91	(3)
2016–2017	Jeonbuk Hyundai Motors	48	(0)
2018–2024	Ulsan Hyundai	86	(4)
2020–2021	→ Pocheon Citizen (army)	18	(4)
2025–	Daejeon	15	(0)

International career^{‡}
2009	South Korea U-20	2	(0)
- * Club domestic league appearances and goals as of 3 August 2026 ‡ National team caps and goals as of 9 October 2009

- Lim Jong-eun
- Hangul: 임종은
- Hanja: 林宗垠
- RR: Im Jongeun
- MR: Im Chongŭn

Lim Jong-Eun (Korean: 임종은; born 18 June 1990) is a South Korean footballer who currently plays for Daejeon.

== Career statistics ==
As of match played 30 November 2024.

Appearances and goals by club, season and competition
Club	Season	League			Cup		League Cup		Continental		Total	
Club	Season	Division	Apps	Goals	Apps	Goals	Apps	Goals	Apps	Goals	Apps	Goals
Ulsan Hyundai	2009	K League 1	15	0	1	0	4	0	4	0	24	0
Seongnam Ilhwa Chunma	2012	K League 1	38	2	1	0	—		6	0	45	2
Jeonnam Dragons	2013	K League 1	34	2	0	0	—		—		34	2
Jeonnam Dragons	2014	K League 1	29	0	1	0	—		—		30	0
Jeonnam Dragons	2015	K League 1	28	1	4	1	—		—		32	2
Jeonnam Dragons	Total		91	3	5	1	—		—		96	4
Jeonbuk Hyundai Motors	2016	K League 1	28	0	1	0	11	1	2	0	42	1
Jeonbuk Hyundai Motors	2017	K League 1	20	0	0	0	—		—		20	0
Jeonbuk Hyundai Motors	Total		48	0	1	0	11	1	2	0	62	1
Ulsan Hyundai	2018	K League 1	31	2	3	0	5	1	—		39	3
Ulsan Hyundai	2021	K League 1	11	1	4	1	6	0	—		21	2
Ulsan Hyundai	2022	K League 1	15	1	3	0	4	0	—		22	1
Ulsan Hyundai	2023	K League 1	5	0	2	1	0	0	—		7	1
Ulsan Hyundai	2024	K League 1	24	0	5	1	5	0	—		34	1
Ulsan Hyundai	Total		86	4	17	3	20	1	—		123	8
Pocheon Citizen (army)	2020	K4 League	15	4	0	0	—		0	0	15	4
Pocheon Citizen (army)	2021	K4 League	3	0	—		—		—		3	0
Pocheon Citizen (army)	Total		18	4	0	0	—		0	0	18	4
Career total			296	13	25	4	35	1	10	0	366	19

== Honours ==
=== Club ===
Ulsan Hyundai

- K League 1: 2022, 2023, 2024
