= 2012 AFC Champions League =

31st edition of premier club football tournament organized by the AFC

Tournament details
- Dates: 10 February – 10 November 2012
- Teams: 37 (from 11 associations)

Final positions
- Champions: (South Korea) Ulsan Hyundai (1st title)
- Runners-up: (Saudi Arabia) Al-Ahli

Tournament statistics
- Matches played: 117
- Goals scored: 338 (2.89 per match)
- Attendance: 1,480,245 (12,652 per match)
- Top scorer(s): Ricardo Oliveira (12 goals)
- Best player: Lee Keun-ho

The 2012 AFC Champions League was the 31st edition of the top-level Asian club football tournament organized by the Asian Football Confederation (AFC), and the 10th under the current AFC Champions League title.

Ulsan Hyundai from South Korea won their first title, defeating Al-Ahli from Saudi Arabia with a 4-1 win in the final.

== Allocation of entries per association ==
The AFC approved criteria for participation in the 2011 and 2012 seasons. The final decision date was set after the Executive Committee meeting in November 2010.

On 30 November 2009, the AFC announced 12 more MA's that were keen to join the ACL, in addition to ten participating national associations. Singapore later withdrew. The full list of candidate associations were as follows:

East Asia

- Participating: Australia, China PR, Indonesia, Japan, (South Korea) Korea Republic
- Applied to participate: Malaysia, Myanmar, Thailand
- Withdrew: Singapore
- Disqualified: Vietnam

West Asia

- Participating: Iran, Qatar, Saudi Arabia, (United Arab Emirates) UAE, Uzbekistan
- Applied to participate: India, Iraq, Jordan, Oman, Pakistan, Palestine, Tajikistan, Yemen

Note: India, Singapore, Thailand and Vietnam have clubs taking part in play-offs to qualify for the group stages of ACL in 2010.

=== Entrants per association ===
It was originally announced that the allocation for entry to the 2012 ACL would stay the same as the previous three seasons with the exception of Vietnam, who were disqualified, and their previous playoff slot was awarded to Qatar. However, following the AFC Executive Committee meeting in November 2011, it was decided that the number of slots for each association to be changed based on evaluation of the AFC Champions League criteria that took place in 2011.

A total of eleven member associations (see below) which participated in the 2011 AFC Champions League was evaluated for participating in the 2012 AFC Champions League. India, which played in the 2011 ACL play-off, was not evaluated and dropped to the AFC Cup. The other member associations which applied but did not meet the criteria for 2011 ACL was not evaluated at all for 2012.

Evaluation for 2012 ACL
Meet all items of the criteria
Meet some items of the criteria
Do not meet the criteria

West Asia
Member Association	Clubs	Spots		
Member Association	Clubs	Group stage	Play-off	AFC Cup
Qatar	12	4	0	0
Saudi Arabia	14	3	1	0
(United Arab Emirates) UAE	12	3	1	0
Uzbekistan	14	3^{[A]}	1	0
Iran	18	2	2	0
Total		14^{[A]}	5	—

East Asia
Member Association	Clubs	Spots		
Member Association	Clubs	Group stage	Play-off	AFC Cup
Japan	18	4	0	0
(South Korea) Korea Republic	15 (16)^{[B]}	3	1	0
China PR	16	3	1^{[E]}	0
Australia	9 (10)^{[C]}	2	1	0
Thailand	18	1	1	0
Indonesia	24^{[D]}	0	1	1
Total		14^{[A]}	5^{[E]}	—

Notes

- ^{A} One of the group stage direct entrants from Uzbekistan was moved to the East Zone.
- ^{B} One of the K-League clubs, Sangju Sangmu Phoenix, is unable to qualify for the ACL because the team is not a commercial entity and their players are not professionally contracted.
- ^{C} While the 2010–11 A-League, the season which qualified Australian clubs to the 2012 ACL, had 11 teams, the 2011–12 A-League, the ongoing season, only has 10 teams after North Queensland Fury was closed, and this number was given in the 2012 ACL evaluation report (page 8). One of the A-League clubs, Wellington Phoenix, is based in New Zealand, an OFC member country, and are unable to qualify for the ACL.
- ^{D} This number was given in the 2012 ACL evaluation report (page 8). The 2010–11 Indonesia Super League, the season which qualified Indonesian clubs to the 2012 ACL, had 15 teams, and the 2011–12 Indonesian Premier League, the ongoing top division recognized by the Football Association of Indonesia, has 13 teams. There are two rival "top-division" leagues in Indonesia: the Indonesian Premier League and the Indonesia Super League (the ISL was by then not recognized by the Football Association of Indonesia).
- ^{E} China was allocated a berth in the qualifying play-off, but Liaoning Whowin, the 2011 Chinese Super League 3rd place, did not enter the competition. Therefore, only four teams entered the East Zone qualifying play-off.

== Teams ==
A total of 37 teams participated in the 2012 AFC Champions League.

- 28 teams (14 in West Zone, 14 in East Zone) directly entered the group stage.
- 9 teams (5 in West Zone, 4 in East Zone) competed in the qualifying play-off, which was divided into two rounds. The 4 winners (2 in West Zone, 2 in East Zone) qualified for the group stage. Losers of the qualifying play-off final round entered the 2012 AFC Cup group stage. However, losers of the qualifying play-off semi-final round were eliminated from all AFC competitions, a change from previous seasons where they would also enter the AFC Cup.

Group stage direct entrants: West Zone (Groups A–D)
Team	Qualifying method	App*	Last App
(Qatar) Lekhwiya	2010–11 Qatar Stars League champions	1st	none
(Qatar) Al-Rayyan	2011 Emir of Qatar Cup winners 2010–11 Qatar Stars League 3rd place	4th	2011
(Qatar) Al-Gharafa	2010–11 Qatar Stars League runners-up	7th	2011
(Qatar) Al-Arabi	2010–11 Qatar Stars League 4th place	1st	none
(Saudi Arabia) Al-Hilal	2010–11 Saudi Professional League champions	8th	2011
(Saudi Arabia) Al-Ahli	2011 King Cup of Champions winners	5th	2010
(Saudi Arabia) Al-Ittihad	2010–11 Saudi Professional League runners-up	8th	2011
(United Arab Emirates) Al-Jazira	2010–11 UAE Pro-League champions 2010–11 UAE President's Cup winners	4th	2011
(United Arab Emirates) Baniyas	2010–11 UAE Pro-League runners-up	1st	none
(United Arab Emirates) Al-Nasr	2010–11 UAE Pro-League 3rd place	1st	none
(Uzbekistan) Pakhtakor	2011 Uzbekistan Cup winners 2011 Uzbek League 3rd place	10th	2011
(Uzbekistan) Nasaf Qarshi	2011 Uzbek League runners-up	1st	none
(Iran) Sepahan	2010–11 Persian Gulf Cup champions	8th	2011
(Iran) Pirozi	2010–11 Hazfi Cup winners	4th	2011
Qualifying play-off participants: West Zone
(Iran) Esteghlal	2010–11 Persian Gulf Cup runners-up	5th	2011
(Iran) Zob Ahan	2010–11 Persian Gulf Cup 3rd place	4th	2011
(Saudi Arabia) Al-Ettifaq	2010–11 Saudi Professional League 3rd place	2nd	2009
(United Arab Emirates) Al-Shabab	2010–11 UAE Pro-League 4th place	2nd	2009
(Uzbekistan) Neftchi Farg'ona	2011 Uzbek League 4th place	5th	2007

Group stage direct entrants: East Zone (Groups E–H)
Team	Qualifying method	App*	Last App
(Japan) Kashiwa Reysol	2011 J.League Division 1 champions	1st	none
(Japan) FC Tokyo	2011 Emperor's Cup winners	1st	none
(Japan) Nagoya Grampus	2011 J.League Division 1 runners-up	3rd	2011
(Japan) Gamba Osaka	2011 J.League Division 1 3rd place	6th	2011
(South Korea) Jeonbuk Hyundai Motors	2011 K-League champions	6th	2011
(South Korea) Seongnam Ilhwa Chunma	2011 Korean FA Cup winners	5th	2010
(South Korea) Ulsan Hyundai	2011 K-League runners-up	3rd	2009
(China) Guangzhou Evergrande	2011 Chinese Super League champions	1st	none
(China) Tianjin Teda	2011 Chinese FA Cup winners	3rd	2011
(China) Beijing Guoan	2011 Chinese Super League runners-up	4th	2010
(Australia) Brisbane Roar	2010–11 A-League premiers 2011 A-League Grand Final winners	1st	none
(Australia) Central Coast Mariners	2010–11 A-League regular season runners-up	2nd	2009
(Thailand) Buriram United	2011 Thai Premier League champions 2011 Thai FA Cup winners	2nd	2009
(Uzbekistan) Bunyodkor^{†}	2011 Uzbek League champions	5th	2011
Qualifying play-off participants: East Zone
(South Korea) Pohang Steelers	2011 K-League 3rd place	4th	2010
(Australia) Adelaide United	2010–11 A-League regular season 3rd place	4th	2010
(Thailand) Chonburi	2011 Thai Premier League runners-up	2nd	2008
(Indonesia) Persipura Jayapura^{‡}	2010–11 Indonesia Super League champions	2nd	2010

Notes

- ^{*} Number of appearances (including qualifying rounds) since the 2002/03 season, when the competition was rebranded as the AFC Champions League.
- ^{†} Bunyodkor (Uzbekistan) was moved to the East Zone.
- ^{‡} Persipura Jayapura were initially disqualified by the AFC from participating but on appeal to the Court of Arbitration for Sport, the CAS ruled on 1 February 2012 that they should be provisionally reinstated to the competition and were entitled to play in the qualifying play-off.
- Al-Kuwait (Kuwait), the 2011 AFC Cup runners-up, failed to fulfil the criteria set by AFC to compete in the 2012 AFC Champions League, and thus directly entered the 2012 AFC Cup. Nasaf Qarshi (Uzbekistan), the 2011 AFC Cup winners, already directly qualified for the group stage based on their domestic performance.

== Schedule ==
Schedule of dates for 2012 competition.

Phase	Round	Draw date	First leg	Second leg
Qualifying play-offs	Semi-finals	6 December 2011	10 February 2012	
Qualifying play-offs	Finals	6 December 2011	18 February 2012	
Group stage	Matchday 1	6 December 2011	6–7 March 2012	
Group stage	Matchday 2	6 December 2011	20–21 March 2012	
Group stage	Matchday 3	6 December 2011	3–4 April 2012	
Group stage	Matchday 4	6 December 2011	17–18 April 2012	
Group stage	Matchday 5	6 December 2011	1–2 May 2012	
Group stage	Matchday 6	6 December 2011	15–16 May 2012	
Knockout phase	Round of 16	6 December 2011	22–23 May 2012 (W), 29–30 May 2012 (E)	
Knockout phase	Quarter-finals	14 June 2012	19 September 2012	2–3 October 2012
Knockout phase	Semi-finals	14 June 2012	24 October 2012	31 October 2012
Knockout phase	Final	14 June 2012	9 or 10 November 2012 at home of one of the finalists	

== Qualifying play-off ==
The draw for the qualifying play-off was held in Kuala Lumpur, Malaysia on 6 December 2011. The winners advanced to the group stage, while the losers of the final round advanced to the AFC Cup group stage, except the loser of the match between Adelaide United and Persipura Jayapura.

=== West Zone ===
Team 1	Score	Team 2
Semi-final Round
Esteghlal (Iran)	2–0	(Iran) Zob Ahan
Final Round
Al-Shabab (United Arab Emirates)	3–0	(Uzbekistan) Neftchi Farg'ona
Esteghlal (Iran)	3–1	(Saudi Arabia) Al-Ettifaq

=== East Zone ===
Team 1	Score	Team 2
Final Round
Pohang Steelers (South Korea)	2–0	(Thailand) Chonburi
Adelaide United (Australia)	3–0	(Indonesia) Persipura Jayapura

== Group stage ==
The draw for the group stage was held in Kuala Lumpur, Malaysia on 6 December 2011. Clubs from the same country may not be drawn into the same group. The winners and runners-up of each group advanced to the knockout stage.

=== Group A ===
Pos	Team	Pld	W	D	L	GF	GA	GD	Pts	Qualification	JAZ	EST	RAY	NQA
1	(United Arab Emirates) Al-Jazira	6	5	1	0	18	10	+8	16	Advance to knockout stage	—	1–1	3–2	4–1
2	(Iran) Esteghlal	6	3	2	1	8	3	+5	11	Advance to knockout stage	1–2	—	3–0	0–0
3	(Qatar) Al-Rayyan	6	2	0	4	9	12	−3	6		3–4	0–1	—	3–1
4	(Uzbekistan) Nasaf Qarshi	6	0	1	5	4	14	−10	1		2–4	0–2	0–1	—

Source: WorldFootball.net

=== Group B ===
Pos	Team	Pld	W	D	L	GF	GA	GD	Pts	Qualification	ITT	YAS	PAK	ARA
1	(Saudi Arabia) Al-Ittihad	6	5	1	0	13	4	+9	16	Advance to knockout stage	—	1–0	4–0	3–2
2	(United Arab Emirates) Baniyas	6	3	2	1	9	2	+7	11	Advance to knockout stage	0–0	—	2–0	2–0
3	(Uzbekistan) Pakhtakor	6	2	1	3	6	10	−4	7		1–2	1–1	—	3–1
4	(Qatar) Al-Arabi	6	0	0	6	4	16	−12	0		1–3	0–4	0–1	—

Source: WorldFootball.net

=== Group C ===
Pos	Team	Pld	W	D	L	GF	GA	GD	Pts	Qualification	SEP	AHL	NAS	LEK
1	(Iran) Sepahan	6	4	1	1	9	4	+5	13	Advance to knockout stage	—	2–1	1–0	2–1
2	(Saudi Arabia) Al-Ahli	6	3	1	2	10	6	+4	10	Advance to knockout stage	1–1	—	3–1	3–0
3	(United Arab Emirates) Al-Nasr	6	2	0	4	6	11	−5	6 (Note: Al-Nasr and Lekhwiya are ranked by their head-to-head record (Al-Nasr: 6 pts; Lekhwiya: 0 pts).)		0–3	1–2	—	2–1
4	(Qatar) Lekhwiya	6	2	0	4	5	9	−4	6		1–0	1–0	1–2	—

Source: WorldFootball.net

=== Group D ===
Pos	Team	Pld	W	D	L	GF	GA	GD	Pts	Qualification	HIL	PER	GHA	SHA
1	(Saudi Arabia) Al-Hilal	6	3	3	0	10	7	+3	12	Advance to knockout stage	—	1–1	2–1	2–1
2	(Iran) Persepolis	6	3	2	1	14	5	+9	11	Advance to knockout stage	0–1	—	1–1	6–1
3	(Qatar) Al-Gharafa	6	1	3	2	7	10	−3	6		3–3	0–3	—	2–1
4	(United Arab Emirates) Al-Shabab	6	0	2	4	5	14	−9	2		1–1	1–3	0–0	—

Source: WorldFootball.net

=== Group E ===
Pos	Team	Pld	W	D	L	GF	GA	GD	Pts	Qualification	ADE	BYD	POH	GMB
1	(Australia) Adelaide United	6	4	1	1	7	2	+5	13	Advance to knockout stage	—	0–0	1–0	2–0
2	(Uzbekistan) Bunyodkor	6	3	1	2	8	7	+1	10	Advance to knockout stage	1–2	—	1–0	3–2
3	(South Korea) Pohang Steelers	6	3	0	3	6	4	+2	9		1–0	0–2	—	2–0
4	(Japan) Gamba Osaka	6	1	0	5	5	13	−8	3		0–2	3–1	0–3	—

Source: WorldFootball.net

=== Group F ===
Pos	Team	Pld	W	D	L	GF	GA	GD	Pts	Qualification	ULS	TOK	BBR	BEG
1	(South Korea) Ulsan Hyundai	6	4	2	0	11	7	+4	14	Advance to knockout stage	—	1–0	1–1	2–1
2	(Japan) FC Tokyo	6	3	2	1	12	6	+6	11	Advance to knockout stage	2–2	—	4–2	3–0
3	(Australia) Brisbane Roar	6	0	3	3	6	11	−5	3 (Note: Brisbane Roar and Beijing Guoan are tied on their head-to-head record (2 pts, 0 GD, 2 GF), overall goal difference and overall goals scored, and so are ranked by their fair play record (Brisbane Roar: 12 pts; Beijing Guoan: 18 pts).)		1–2	0–2	—	1–1
4	(China) Beijing Guoan	6	0	3	3	6	11	−5	3		2–3	1–1	1–1	—

Source: WorldFootball.net

=== Group G ===
Pos	Team	Pld	W	D	L	GF	GA	GD	Pts	Qualification	SIC	NGY	CCM	TTD
1	(South Korea) Seongnam Ilhwa Chunma	6	2	4	0	13	5	+8	10 (Note: Seongnam Ilhwa Chunma and Nagoya Grampus are tied on their head-to-head record (2 pts, 0 GD, 3 GF), and so are ranked by their overall goal difference.)	Advance to knockout stage	—	1–1	5–0	1–1
2	(Japan) Nagoya Grampus	6	2	4	0	10	4	+6	10	Advance to knockout stage	2–2	—	3–0	0–0
3	(Australia) Central Coast Mariners	6	1	3	2	7	11	−4	6		1–1	1–1	—	5–1
4	(China) Tianjin Teda	6	0	3	3	2	12	−10	3		0–3	0–3	0–0	—

Source: WorldFootball.net

=== Group H ===
Pos	Team	Pld	W	D	L	GF	GA	GD	Pts	Qualification	GEG	KSR	JHM	BRU
1	(China) Guangzhou Evergrande	6	3	1	2	12	8	+4	10 (Note: Guangzhou Evergrande and Kashiwa Reysol are ranked by their head-to-head record (Guangzhou Evergrande: 4 pts; Kashiwa Reysol: 1 pt).)	Advance to knockout stage	—	3–1	1–3	1–2
2	(Japan) Kashiwa Reysol	6	3	1	2	11	7	+4	10	Advance to knockout stage	0–0	—	5–1	1–0
3	(South Korea) Jeonbuk Hyundai Motors	6	3	0	3	10	15	−5	9		1–5	0–2	—	3–2
4	(Thailand) Buriram United	6	2	0	4	8	11	−3	6		1–2	3–2	0–2	—

Source: WorldFootball.net

== Knockout stage ==
=== Bracket ===
Round of 16
(Australia) Adelaide United	1
(Japan) Nagoya Grampus	0
(South Korea) Seongnam Ilhwa Chunma	0
(Uzbekistan) Bunyodkor	1
(South Korea) Ulsan Hyundai	3
(Japan) Kashiwa Reysol	2
(Saudi Arabia) Al-Hilal	7
(United Arab Emirates) Baniyas	1
(Saudi Arabia) Al-Ittihad	3
(Iran) Persepolis	0
(China) Guangzhou Evergrande	1
(Japan) FC Tokyo	0
(Iran) Sepahan	2
(Iran) Esteghlal	0
(United Arab Emirates) Al-Jazira	3 (2)
(Saudi Arabia) Al-Ahli (p)	3 (4)

Quarter-finals
(Australia) Adelaide United	2	2	4
(Uzbekistan) Bunyodkor (a.e.t.)	2	3	5
(South Korea) Ulsan Hyundai	1	4	5
(Saudi Arabia) Al-Hilal	0	0	0
(Saudi Arabia) Al-Ittihad	4	1	5
(China) Guangzhou Evergrande	2	2	4
(Iran) Sepahan	0	1	1
(Saudi Arabia) Al-Ahli	0	4	4

Semi-finals
(Uzbekistan) Bunyodkor	1	0	1
(South Korea) Ulsan Hyundai	3	2	5
(Saudi Arabia) Al-Ittihad	1	0	1
(Saudi Arabia) Al-Ahli	0	2	2

Final
(South Korea) Ulsan Hyundai	3
(Saudi Arabia) Al-Ahli	0

=== Round of 16 ===
The matchups for the round of 16 were decided based on the results from the group stage. Each tie was played as one match, hosted by the winners of each group (Team 1) against the runners-up of another group (Team 2).

West Zone
Team 1	Score	Team 2
Al-Jazira (United Arab Emirates)	3–3 (aet) (2–4 p)	(Saudi Arabia) Al-Ahli
Sepahan (Iran)	2–0	(Iran) Esteghlal
Al-Ittihad (Saudi Arabia)	3–0	(Iran) Persepolis
Al-Hilal (Saudi Arabia)	7–1	(United Arab Emirates) Baniyas

East Zone
Team 1	Score	Team 2
Adelaide United (Australia)	1–0	(Japan) Nagoya Grampus
Seongnam Ilhwa Chunma (South Korea)	0–1	(Uzbekistan) Bunyodkor
Ulsan Hyundai (South Korea)	3–2	(Japan) Kashiwa Reysol
Guangzhou Evergrande (China)	1–0	(Japan) FC Tokyo

=== Quarter-finals ===
The draw for the quarter-finals, semi-finals, and final was held in Kuala Lumpur, Malaysia on 14 June 2012. It determined the matchups for the quarter-finals and semi-finals as well as the potential host for the final.

Team 1	Agg.	Team 2	1st leg	2nd leg
Al-Ittihad (Saudi Arabia)	5–4	(China) Guangzhou Evergrande	4–2	1–2
Sepahan (Iran)	1–4	(Saudi Arabia) Al-Ahli	0–0	1–4
Adelaide United (Australia)	4–5	(Uzbekistan) Bunyodkor	2–2	2–3 (a.e.t.)
Ulsan Hyundai (South Korea)	5–0	(Saudi Arabia) Al-Hilal	1–0	4–0

=== Semi-finals ===
Team 1	Agg.	Team 2	1st leg	2nd leg
Al-Ittihad (Saudi Arabia)	1–2	(Saudi Arabia) Al-Ahli	1–0	0–2
Bunyodkor (Uzbekistan)	1–5	(South Korea) Ulsan Hyundai	1–3	0–2

=== Final ===
The final of the 2012 AFC Champions League was hosted by one of the finalists, decided by a draw. According to the draw on 14 June 2012, the winner of semi-final 2 would host the final. Therefore, Ulsan Hyundai was the home team.

10 November 2012
19:30 UTC+09:00

Ulsan Hyundai (South Korea)	3–0	(Saudi Arabia) Al-Ahli
Kwak Tae-Hwi 13'; Rafinha 68'; Kim Seung-Yong 75'	Report

Ulsan Munsu Football Stadium, Ulsan
Attendance: 42,153
Referee: Ben Williams (Australia)

== Top scorers ==
Rank	Player	Club	MD1	MD2	MD3	MD4	MD5	MD6	R16	QF1	QF2	SF1	SF2	F	Total
1	(Brazil) Ricardo Oliveira	(United Arab Emirates) Al-Jazira	1	1		1	3	4	2						12
2	(Saudi Arabia) Naif Hazazi	(Saudi Arabia) Al-Ittihad		2	1		1		1	2		1			8
3	(Brazil) Rafinha	(Japan) Gamba Osaka (GS) (South Korea) Ulsan Hyundai (QF+SF+F)			2					1	2	1		1	7
3	(Brazil) Victor Simões	(Saudi Arabia) Al-Ahli		1	1	1	1		1		1		1		7
5	(Argentina) Darío Conca	(China) Guangzhou Evergrande	2			1	1	1			1				6
5	(South Korea) Kim Shin-Wook	(South Korea) Ulsan Hyundai	1				1		1		1	1	1		6
7	(Libya) Éamon Zayed	(Iran) Persepolis		3	1			1							5
7	(Brazil) Bruno Correa	(Iran) Sepahan	1	1	1		1		1						5
7	(Brazil) Leandro Domingues	(Japan) Kashiwa Reysol		2			1	1	1						5
7	(South Korea) Yoo Byung-Soo	(Saudi Arabia) Al-Hilal				1			4						5
7	(Ivory Coast) Amara Diané	(United Arab Emirates) Al-Nasr		2	1	1		1							5

Note: Goals scored in qualifying play-off not counted.

== See also ==
- 2012 AFC Cup
- 2012 AFC President's Cup
