= Park Se-young (footballer) =

South Korean footballer

Park Se-Young
Personal information
- Full name: Park Se-Young
- Date of birth: 3 October 1989 (age 37)
- Place of birth: South Korea
- Height: 1.84 m (6 ft 1/2 in)
- Position: Forward

Team information
- Current team: Gimhae FC
- Number: 13

Youth career
- Dong-A University

Senior career*
Years	Team	Apps	(Gls)
2012	Seongnam Ilhwa	4	(2)
2013–	Gimhae FC	8	(1)
- * Club domestic league appearances and goals as of 13 July 2013

Park Se-Young (Korean: 박세영; born 3 October 1989) is a South Korean footballer who plays as a forward for Gimhae FC in the Korea National League.
