= Park Jin-po =

South Korean footballer

Park Jin-Po
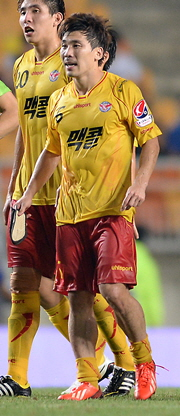

Personal information
- Full name: Park Jin-Po
- Date of birth: 13 August 1987 (age 39)
- Place of birth: Ulsan, South Korea
- Height: 1.73 m (5 ft 8 in)
- Position: Right back

Team information
- Current team: Ulsan Citizen FC
- Number: 6

Youth career
- 2007–2010: Daegu University

Senior career*
Years	Team	Apps	(Gls)
2011–2016	Seongnam FC	138	(2)
2015–2016	→ Sangju Sangmu (army)	52	(3)
2017–2019	Jeju United	60	(1)
2021–2024	Ulsan Citizen FC	79	(1)
Total		329	(7)
- * Club domestic league appearances and goals as of 1 September 2024

- Park Jin-po
- Hangul: 박진포
- Hanja: 朴珍鋪
- RR: Bak Jinpo
- MR: Pak Chinp'o

Park Jin-Po (Korean: 박진포; born 13 August 1987) is a South Korean former footballer who plays as a full back.

== Club career ==
Park was selected from the K-League draft by Seongnam Ilhwa Chunma for the 2011 K-League season. On 5 March 2011, Park made his debut against Pohang Steelers in a 1–1 away draw, and promptly earned himself a yellow card.

== Career statistics ==
As of match played 1 September 2024

Appearances and goals by club, season and competition
Club	Season	League			Cup		League Cup		Continental		Other		Total	
Club	Season	Division	Apps	Goals	Apps	Goals	Apps	Goals	Apps	Goals	Apps	Goals	Apps	Goals
Seongnam FC	2011	K League 1	28	0	5	0	4	0	—		—		37	0
Seongnam FC	2012	K League 1	40	0	2	0	—		7	0	—		49	0
Seongnam FC	2013	K League 1	35	1	2	0	—		—		—		37	1
Seongnam FC	2014	K League 1	32	1	4	0	—		—		—		36	1
Seongnam FC	2016	K League 1	2	0	—		—		—		1	0	3	0
Seongnam FC	Total		137	2	13	0	4	0	7	0	1	0	162	2
Sangju Sangmu (army)	2015	K League 2	32	3	0	0	—		—		—		32	3
Sangju Sangmu (army)	2016	K League 1	20	0	0	0	—		—		—		20	0
Sangju Sangmu (army)	Total		52	3	0	0	—		—		—		52	3
Jeju United	2017	K League 1	12	1	0	0	—		3	0	—		15	0
Jeju United	2018	K League 1	26	0	1	0	—		5	0	—		32	0
Jeju United	2019	K League 1	22	0	0	0	—		—		—		22	0
Jeju United	Total		60	1	1	0	—		8	0	—		69	0
Ulsan Citizen	2021	K3 League	27	0	1	0	—		—		—		28	0
Ulsan Citizen	2022	K3 League	23	0	2	1	—		—		—		25	1
Ulsan Citizen	2023	K3 League	14	1	0	0	—		—		—		14	1
Ulsan Citizen	2024	K3 League	15	0	1	0	—		—		—		16	0
Ulsan Citizen	Total		79	1	4	1	—		—		—		83	2
Career total			328	7	18	1	4	0	7	0	1	0	358	8

== Honors ==
Seongnam Ilhwa Chunma

- 2011 FA Cup Winner
