= Lee Chang-hoon (footballer) =

South Korean footballer

Lee Chang-Hoon 이창훈
Personal information
- Full name: Lee Chang-Hoon
- Date of birth: 17 December 1986 (age 39)
- Place of birth: Incheon, South Korea
- Height: 1.73 m (5 ft 8 in)
- Position: Winger

Team information
- Current team: Kelantan United

Youth career
- 2005–2008: University of Incheon

Senior career*
Years	Team	Apps	(Gls)
2009–2011	Gangwon	54	(2)
2011–2018	Seongnam	78	(3)
2015–2016	→ Sangju Sangmu (army)	22	(4)
2018	Melaka United	5	(2)
2019	PDRM	20	(11)
2020	Penang	12	(3)
2021–2022	Sarawak United	19	(1)
2023–	Kelantan United		
- * Club domestic league appearances and goals as of 3 August 2021

- Lee Chang-hoon
- Hangul: 이창훈
- Hanja: 李昶勳
- RR: I Changhun
- MR: I Ch'anghun

Lee Chang-Hoon (Korean: 이창훈, born December 17, 1986) is a South Korean footballer who plays as a winger for Malaysia Super League club Kelantan United.

== Club career ==
On November 20, 2008, Gangwon was called as the third order at 2009 K-League Draft.

His first K-League match was against FC Seoul in Seoul, March 14, 2009. In this game, he won a penalty kick by causing a handball by FC Seoul's defender Kevin Hatchi. However Masahiro Ōhashi missed the resulting penalty kick. In spite of that, Gangwon won by 2–1. He scored his first pro goal against Jeonbuk on 27 June 2009.

On 4 July 2011, he move to Seongnam Ilhwa Chunma.

=== Melaka United ===
On 30 May 2018, Lee signed a contract with Malaysia Super League club Melaka United.

== Career statistics ==
=== Club ===
As of 28 July 2018

Appearances and goals by club, season and competition
Club	Season	League			Cup		League Cup		Continental		Total	
Club	Season	Division	Apps	Goals	Apps	Goals	Apps	Goals	Apps	Goals	Apps	Goals
Gangwon	2009	K League 1	21	1	1	0	3	0	-		25	1
Gangwon	2010	K League 1	21	1	0	0	4	1	-		25	2
Gangwon	2011	K League 1	12	0	1	0	4	1	-		17	1
Gangwon	Total		54	2	2	0	11	2	0	0	67	4
Seongnam	2011	K League 1	9	0	0	0	0	0	-		9	0
Seongnam	2012	K League 1	23	2	0	0	0	0	-		23	2
Seongnam	2013	K League 1	7	0	0	0	0	0	-		7	0
Seongnam	2014	K League 1	21	0	2	1	0	0	-		23	1
Seongnam	2016	K League 1	2	0	0	0	0	0	-		2	0
Seongnam	2017	K League 2	16	1	2	0	0	0	-		18	1
Seongnam	Total		78	3	4	1	0	0	0	0	82	4
Sangju Sangmu (loan)	2015	K League 1	22	4	0	0	0	0	-		22	4
Sangju Sangmu (loan)	Total		22	4	0	0	0	0	0	0	22	4
Melaka United	2018	Malaysia Super League	5	2	0	0	0	0	-		5	2
Melaka United	Total		5	2	0	0	0	0	0	0	5	2
Career total			159	11	6	1	11	0	2	0	178	12

== Honours ==
Penang

- Malaysia Premier League: 2020
