= Éverton Santos =

Brazilian footballer (born 1986)

Everton Santos
Personal information
- Full name: Everton Leandro dos Santos Pinto
- Date of birth: 14 October 1986 (age 40)
- Place of birth: São José dos Campos, Brazil
- Height: 1.76 m (5 ft 9 in)
- Positions: Striker; winger

Team information
- Current team: Figueirense
- Number: 19

Youth career
- 2005: São José-SP

Senior career*
Years	Team	Apps	(Gls)
2005–2006	Santo André	1	(0)
2006	→ São Bernardo (loan)	0	(0)
2007	Bragantino	21	(6)
2007	Corinthians	23	(1)
2008–2011	Paris Saint-Germain	1	(0)
2008–2009	→ Fluminense (loan)	26	(3)
2009	→ Albirex Niigata (loan)	11	(0)
2010	→ Goiás (loan)	31	(5)
2011	→ Ponte Preta (loan)	6	(3)
2011	→ Seongnam Ilhwa (loan)	25	(5)
2012	Seongnam Ilhwa	36	(12)
2013–2014	Ponte Preta	18	(1)
2013–2014	→ Figueirense (loan)	35	(8)
2014–2015	FC Seoul	32	(7)
2015	Ulsan Hyundai	8	(0)
2016	Figueirense	30	(1)
2017	Santa Cruz	16	(6)
2017–2018	Mumbai City	18	(7)
2018	Botafogo Futebol Clube (SP)	11	(0)
2018–2019	ATK	16	(0)
2019–2021	Figueirense	54	(1)
2022	Lemense-SP	15	(0)
Total		433	(66)
- * Club domestic league appearances and goals

Éverton Leandro dos Santos Pinto or simply Éverton Santos (born 14 October 1986 in São José dos Campos, São Paulo state) is a Brazilian footballer who currently plays as a forward.

== Career ==
He started his career playing in the youth groups of São José EC. On 2 March 2010 Goiás Esporte Clube signed the striker on loan from Paris Saint-Germain.

On 21 March 2011, Éverton Santos moved to the South Korean K League Classic side Seongnam Ilhwa Chunma on a loan deal, which was made permanent after paying overdue wages for about €75K. On 17 July 2014, Éverton moved to the South Korean K League Classic side FC Seoul. On 28 July 2015, he joined Ulsan Hyundai.

In August 2017, Santos signed for Indian Super League franchise Mumbai City.

In September 2018, Santos moved to fellow Indian club ATK.

== Career statistics ==
Appearances and goals by club, season and competition
Club	Season	League			State League		Cup		League Cup		Continental		Other		Total	
Club	Season	Division	Apps	Goals	Apps	Goals	Apps	Goals	Apps	Goals	Apps	Goals	Apps	Goals	Apps	Goals
Bragantino	2007	Série C	—		21	6	—		—		—		—		21	6
Corinthians	2007	Série A	23	1	—		—		—		2	0	—		25	1
Paris Saint-Germain	2007–08	Ligue 1	1	0	—		2	0	0	0	—		—		3	0
Fluminense (loan)	2008	Série A	14	0	—		0	0	—		—		—		14	0
Fluminense (loan)	2009	Série A	2	0	10	3	4	2	—		—		—		16	5
Fluminense (loan)	Total		16	0	10	3	4	2	—		—		—		30	5
Albirex Niigata (loan)	2009	J1 League	11	0	—		2	2	—		—		—		13	2
Goiás (loan)	2010	Série A	31	5	—		3	0	—		7	1	—		41	6
Ponte Preta (loan)	2011	Série B	0	0	6	3	1	0	—		—		—		7	3
Seongnam Ilhwa Chunma (loan)	2011	K League	25	5	—		5	2	3	0	—		—		33	7
Seongnam Ilhwa Chunma	2012	K League	36	12	—		1	1	—		5	3	—		42	16
Seongnam Ilhwa Chunma	Total		61	17	—		6	3	3	0	5	3	—		75	23
Ponte Preta	2013	Série A	11	1	7	0	2	0	—		1	0	—		21	1
Figueirense (loan)	2013	Série B	14	4	—		—		—		—		—		14	4
Figueirense (loan)	2014	Série A	6	0	15	4	2	2	—		—		—		23	6
Figueirense (loan)	Total		20	4	15	4	2	2	—		—		—		37	10
FC Seoul	2014	K League Classic	16	3	—		1	0	—		4	0	—		21	3
FC Seoul	2015	K League Classic	16	4	—		1	1	—		6	1	—		23	6
FC Seoul	Total		32	7	—		2	1	—		10	1	—		44	9
Ulsan Hyundai	2015	K League Classic	8	0	—		1	0	—		—		—		9	0
Figueirense	2016	Série A	15	0	15	1	3	1	—		—		1	1	34	3
Santa Cruz	2017	Série B	5	0	11	6	2	0	—		—		9	1	27	7
Mumbai City	2017–18	Indian Super League	18	7	—		—		—		—		—		18	7
Botafogo-SP	2018	Série C	11	0	—		—		—		—		—		11	0
ATK	2018–19	Indian Super League	16	0	—		—		—		—		—		16	0
Figueirense	2019	Série B	5	0	—		—		—		—		—		5	0
Figueirense	2020	Série B	25	1	4	0	3	0	—		—		—		32	1
Figueirense	2021	Série C	10	0	10	0	—		—		—		—		20	0
Figueirense	Total		40	1	14	0	3	0	—		—		—		57	1
Lemense-SP	2022	Paulista A2	—		15	0	—		—		—		—		15	0
Career total			319	43	114	23	33	11	3	0	25	5	10	2	504	84

== Honours ==
Seongnam Ilhwa Chunma

- Korean FA Cup Winner: 2011
