= Vladimir Jovančić =

Bosnian Serb footballer

Personal information
- Date of birth: 31 May 1987 (age 39)
- Place of birth: Sarajevo, SFR Yugoslavia
- Height: 1.90 m (6 ft 3 in)
- Position: Forward

Senior career*
Years	Team	Apps	(Gls)
2005–2007	BASK	52	(14)
2007–2011	Rad	87	(20)
2011	Partizan	9	(0)
2012	Seongnam FC	16	(3)
2012	→ Tianjin Teda (loan)	14	(3)
2013	Tianjin Teda	13	(1)
2014–2015	Jagodina	16	(4)
Total		207	(45)
- * Club domestic league appearances and goals

Vladimir Jovančić (Serbian Cyrillic: Владимир Јованчић, pronounced [ʋlǎdimiːr jǒʋaːntʃitɕ]; born 31 May 1987) is a Bosnian former professional footballer who played as a forward.

== Career ==
Jovančić started his professional career with BASK, spending two seasons at Careva Ćuprija Stadium. In the summer of 2007, he moved to Rad. Jovančić spent four seasons at Banjica, scoring 16 goals in the top flight from 2008 to 2011. On 3 June 2011, he officially signed a three-year contract with Partizan. However, after only six months, Jovančić left Partizan for K League outfit Seongnam Ilhwa Chunma. In July 2012, he joined Chinese Super League side Tianjin Teda on a six-month loan deal. Jovančić also played there in the 2013 season. In the summer of 2014, he returned to Serbia by signing with Jagodina.

== Personal life ==
He is the nephew of Rade Bogdanović.

== Career statistics ==
Appearances and goals by club, season and competition
Club	Season	League			Cup		Continental		Total	
Club	Season	Division	Apps	Goals	Apps	Goals	Apps	Goals	Apps	Goals
Rad	2007–08	Serbian First League	22	4	1	0	—		23	4
Rad	2008–09	Serbian SuperLiga	18	3	2	1	—		20	4
Rad	2009–10	Serbian SuperLiga	21	5	1	0	—		22	5
Rad	2010–11	Serbian SuperLiga	26	8	2	2	—		28	10
Rad	Total		87	20	6	3	—		93	23
Partizan	2011–12	Serbian SuperLiga	9	0	2	0	5	1	16	1
Seongnam FC	2012	K-League	16	3	2	0	5	3	23	6
Tianjin Teda (loan)	2012	Chinese Super League	14	3	—		—		14	3
Tianjin Teda	2013	Chinese Super League	13	1	1	1	—		14	2
Tianjin Teda	Tianjin total		27	4	1	1	—		28	5
Jagodina	2014–15	Serbian SuperLiga	16	4	2	0	—		18	4
Career total			155	31	13	4	10	4	178	39
