= 2012 Jeonbuk Hyundai Motors season =

Jeonbuk Hyundai Motors
2012 season
- Chairman: Chung Mong-Koo
- Manager: Lee Heung-Sil (interim)
- K-League: 2nd
- Korean FA Cup: Quarterfinal
- Champions League: Group round
- Top goalscorer: League: Lee Dong-Gook (14); All: Lee Dong-Gook (20)
- Highest home attendance: 20,198 vs Seongnam (March 3)
- Lowest home attendance: 1,892 vs Cheonan City (May 23)
- Average home league attendance: 9,621 (as of June 20)
Home colours	Away colours

The 2012 season was Jeonbuk Hyundai Motors' nineteenth season in the K-League in South Korea. Jeonbuk Hyundai Motors is competing K-League, Korean FA Cup and AFC Champions League.

== Current squad ==
Note: Flags indicate national team as defined under FIFA eligibility rules; some limited exceptions apply. Players may hold more than one non-FIFA nationality.

No.	Pos.	Nation	Player
1	GK	KOR	Kim Min-Sik
2	MF	KOR	Jeon Kwang-Hwan
3	DF	KOR	Sim Woo-Yeon
4	MF	KOR	Kim Sang-Sik
6	DF	KOR	Jin Kyung-Sun
7	DF	KOR	Lee Gang-Jin
8	MF	BRA	Eninho
9	FW	KOR	Jeong Shung-Hoon
10	MF	BRA	Leonardo
11	MF	KOR	Lee Seung-Hyun
13	MF	KOR	Jung Hoon
14	FW	KOR	Kim Jung-Woo
15	FW	KOR	Kim Dong-Chan
16	DF	KOR	Cho Sung-Hwan (captain)
17	MF	KOR	Lim You-Hwan
18	DF	AUS	Alex Wilkinson
19	MF	CHI	Hugo Droguett
20	FW	KOR	Lee Dong-Gook

No.	Pos.	Nation	Player
21	MF	KOR	Seo Sang-Min
22	GK	KOR	Choi Eun-Sung
24	MF	KOR	Park Se-Jik
26	DF	KOR	Ma Chul-Jun
27	DF	KOR	Oh Jong-Cheol
29	MF	KOR	Kim Woo-Chul
30	FW	KOR	Kim Hyun
31	GK	KOR	Hong Jeong-Nam
32	MF	KOR	Kang Kyung-Won
33	MF	KOR	Park Won-Jae
34	MF	KOR	Lee Dong-Min
35	DF	KOR	Kang Ju-Ho
36	MF	KOR	Lee Hyeong-Gi
37	MF	KOR	Sin Hak-Seob
38	FW	KOR	Jeong Jae-Won
39	MF	KOR	Hong Ju-Bin
40	FW	KOR	Youn Dong-Kyu
41	GK	KOR	Lee Bum-Soo

=== Out on loan ===
Note: Flags indicate national team as defined under FIFA eligibility rules; some limited exceptions apply. Players may hold more than one non-FIFA nationality.

No.	Pos.	Nation	Player
—	GK	KOR	Kwon Sun-Tae (to Sangju Sangmu Phoenix for military service)
—	MF	KOR	Ha Sung-Min (to Sangju Sangmu Phoenix for military service)
—	MF	KOR	Kim Young-Woo (to National Police Agency FC for military service)
—	DF	KOR	Choi Chul-Soon (to Sangju Sangmu Phoenix for military service)
—	MF	KOR	Kim Hyeung-Bum (to Daejeon Citizen)
—	MF	KOR	Kim Jae-Hwan (to Consadole Sapporo)

== Transfer ==
=== In ===
Note: Flags indicate national team as defined under FIFA eligibility rules; some limited exceptions apply. Players may hold more than one non-FIFA nationality.

No.	Pos.	Nation	Player
—	DF	KOR	Kang Joo-Ho (Drafted from Kyunghee University)
—	DF	KOR	Kim Woo-Cheol (Drafted from Dankook University)
—	DF	KOR	Lee Gang-Jin (Transferred from Jubilo Iwata)
—	MF	KOR	Hong Joo-Bin (Drafted from Dongeui University)
—	MF	KOR	Yoon Dong-Gyu (Drafted from Korea University)
—	MF	KOR	Lee Hyung-Ki (Drafted from Halla University)
—	MF	KOR	Shin Hak-Seob (Drafted from University of Chungbuk)
—	MF	KOR	Lee Dong-Min (Drafted from Dongkang University)
—	MF	KOR	Kim Hyun (Promoted from youth team)
—	MF	KOR	Kim Jung-Woo (Transferred from Seongnam Ilhwa Chunma)

No.	Pos.	Nation	Player
—	FW	KOR	Park Se-Jik (Drafted from Hanyang University)
—	FW	KOR	Jung Jae-Won (Drafted from Jeju Chungang High School)
—	MF	KOR	Seo Sang-Min (Transferred from Gyeongnam FC)
—	MF	CHI	Hugo Droguett (Loaned from Cruz Azul)
—	GK	KOR	Choi Eun-Sung (Free Agent, former Daejeon Citizen)
—	DF	AUS	Alex Wilkinson (Transferred from Central Coast)
—	MF	BRA	Leonardo (Transferred from AEK Athens)

=== Out ===
Note: Flags indicate national team as defined under FIFA eligibility rules; some limited exceptions apply. Players may hold more than one non-FIFA nationality.

No.	Pos.	Nation	Player
—	MF	KOR	Lee Kwang-Hyun (Transferred to Daejeon Citizen)
—	MF	KOR	Park Jung-Hoon (Transferred to Chunnam Dragons)
—	MF	KOR	Kim Ji-Woong (Transferred to Gyeongnam FC)
—	MF	KOR	Seo Jung-Jin (Transferred to Suwon Bluewings)
—	FW	CRO	Krunoslav Lovrek (Contract terminated)
—	DF	KOR	Kim Min-Hak (Released)

No.	Pos.	Nation	Player
—	DF	KOR	Kim Seung-Rok (Free agent)
—	DF	KOR	Im Dong-Jun (Free agent)
—	DF	KOR	Kim Kyung-Min (Free agent)
—	DF	KOR	Kim Hak-Jin (Free agent)
—	MF	BRA	Luiz Henrique (Transferred to Al Shabab)

== Coaching staff ==
Position	Staff
Manager (interim)	(South Korea) Lee Heung-Sil
GK Coach	(South Korea) Choi In-Young
Coach	(South Korea) Jo Seong-Hwan
Coach	(South Korea) Kim Hyun-Soo
Scouter	(South Korea) Cha Jong-Bok

Last updated: 29 February 2012
Source: Jeonbuk Hyundai Motors

== Match results ==
=== K-League ===
All times are Korea Standard Time (KST) – UTC+9

Date Round	Home	Score	Away	Location

3 March 1	Jeonbuk	3 – 2	Seongnam	Jeonju, Jeonbuk
15:00	Lee Dong-Gook 13', 18' (Both assist by No.18); Eninho 82' (Free kick)	Report	Éverton Santos 24', 50'	Stadium: Jeonju World Cup Stadium; Attendance: 20,198; Referee: Kim Jong-Hyuk

11 March 2	Daejeon	0 – 1	Jeonbuk	Yuseong-gu, Daejeon
15:00		Report	Droguett 85'	Stadium: Daejeon World Cup Stadium; Attendance: 10,160; Referee: Mae Ho-Young

17 March 3	Jeonbuk	1 – 1	Chunnam	Jeonju, Jeonbuk
15:00	Lee Dong-Gook 17' (pen.)	Report	Ahn Jae-Joon 31'	Stadium: Jeonju World Cup Stadium; Attendance: 8,992; Referee: Choi Myung-Yong

25 March 4	Seoul	2 – 1	Jeonbuk	Mapo-gu, Seoul
15:00	Ha Dae-Sung 27'; Molina 89'	Report	Lee Dong-Gook 3' (Assist by No.10)	Stadium: Seoul World Cup Stadium; Attendance: 25,811; Referee: Ko Keum-Bok

31 March 5	Jeonbuk	2 – 3	Daegu	Jeonju, Jeonbuk
17:00	Luiz 20' (Assist by No.8); Lee Dong-Gook 47' (pen.)	Report	Ahn Sang-Hyun (yellow card) 45+2' (yellow-red card) 90+2'; Song Je-Heon 73', 84'; Kim Kee-Hee 90+2'	Stadium: Jeonju World Cup Stadium; Attendance: 7,466; Referee: An Yong-Hee

8 April 6	Gyeongnam	0 – 2	Jeonbuk	Changwon, Gyeongnam
15:00		Report	Kim Jung-Woo 33' (Assist by No.8); Lee Dong-Gook 62' (Assist by No.19)	Stadium: Changwon Football Center; Attendance: 3,959; Referee: Kim Dong-Jin

11 April 7	Gangwon	0 – 1	Jeonbuk	Gangneung, Gangwon
17:00		Report	Luiz 69' (Assist by No.21)	Stadium: Gangneung Stadium; Attendance: 3,454; Referee: Lee Min-Hu

14 April 8	Jeonbuk	0 – 0	Busan	Jeonju, Jeonbuk
17:00		Report		Stadium: Jeonju World Cup Stadium; Attendance: 7,820; Referee: Hong Jin-Ho

22 April 9	Pohang	1 – 0	Jeonbuk	Pohang, Gyeongbuk
15:00	Hwang Jin-Sung 3'	Report		Stadium: Pohang Steel Yard; Attendance: 11,053; Referee: Kim Wan-Tae

27 April 10	Jeonbuk	5 – 2	Gwangju	Jeonju, Jeonbuk
19:00	Lim You-Hwan 17' (Assist by No.19); Kim Jung-Woo 23' (Assist by No.19); Eninho 70' (pen.); Droguett 84' (Assist by No.33); Kim Dong-Chan	Report	Kim Eun-sun 45+1', 76'; Jeong Woo-In (yellow card) 55' (yellow-red card) 69'	Stadium: Jeonju World Cup Stadium; Attendance: 6,792; Referee: Choi Myung-Yong

5 May 11	Incheon	3 – 3	Jeonbuk	Nam-gu, Incheon
15:00	Moon Sang-Yoon 3'; Park Jun-Tae 38'; Seol Ki-Hyeon 80'	Report	Eninho 15' (Free kick); Eninho 89' (Assist by No.20); Lee Dong-Gook 90+2' (Assist by No.8)	Stadium: Incheon Football Stadium; Attendance: 6,742; Referee: Kim Dong-Jin

11 May 12	Jeonbuk	2 – 1	Ulsan	Jeonju, Jeonbuk
19:00	Eninho 12' (Assist by No.21); Droguett 16' (Assist by No.21)	Report	Lee Keun-Ho 83'	Stadium: Jeonju World Cup Stadium; Attendance: 9,887; Referee: Yoo Sun-Ho

20 May 13	Sangju	0 – 3	Jeonbuk	Sangju, Gyeongbuk
17:00		Report	Eninho 5' (Assist by No.19); Kim Jung-Woo 42' (Assist by No.19); Kim Jung-Woo 85' (pen.)	Stadium: Sangju Civic Stadium; Attendance: 2,582; Referee: An Yong-Hee

26 May 14	Jeonbuk	3 – 0	Suwon	Jeonju, Jeonbuk
15:00	Droguett 5' (Assist by No.20); Seo Sang-Min 23'; Droguett 72' (Assist by No.20)	Report		Stadium: Jeonju World Cup Stadium; Attendance: 20,765; Referee: Lee Min-Hu

13 June 15	Jeju	1 – 3	Jeonbuk	Seogwipo, Jeju
19:00	Song Jin-Hyung 59'	Report	Jeong Shung-Hoon 10' (Assist by No.8); Huang Bowen 39' (Assist by No.9); Kim Hyun 90' (Assist by No.19)	Stadium: Jeju World Cup Stadium; Attendance: 6,590; Referee: Lee Dong-Jun

17 June 16	Daegu	1 – 5	Jeonbuk	Suseong-gu, Daegu
19:30	Song Je-Heon 87' (pen.)	Report	Droguett 26' (Free kick); Eninho 53' (Assist by No.19); Lee Dong-Gook 67' (Assist by No.14); Jeong Shung-Hoon 83' (Assist by No.8); Lee Seung-Hyun 90' (Assist by No.9)	Stadium: Daegu Stadium; Attendance: 5,004; Referee: Choi Myung-Yong

24 June 17	Jeonbuk	5 – 3	Gyeongnam	Jeonju, Jeonbuk
17:00	Lee Dong-Gook 45' (Assist by No.8); Eninho 61' (pen.); Lee Dong-Gook 78' (pen.); Lee Dong-Gook 80' (Assist by No.10); Seo Sang-Min 90+3' (Assist by No.10)	Report(English); Report(Korean)	Ko Jae-Sung 82'; An Sung-Bin 64'; Kim Ji-Woong 85'	Stadium: Jeonju World Cup Stadium; Attendance: 10,777; Referee: Yoo Sun-Ho

27 June 18	Gwangju	0 – 3	Jeonbuk	Gwangju, Jeonnam
20:00		Report(English); Report(Korean)	Eninho 9' (pen.); Lee Dong-Gook 53' (Assist by No.6); Lee Seung-Hyun 63' (Assist by No.10)	Stadium: Gwangju World Cup Stadium; Attendance: 2,522; Referee: Woo Sang-Il

1 July 19	Jeonbuk	2 – 0	Sangju	Jeonju, Jeonbuk
19:00	Droguett 13', 72'; Lee Dong-Gook (yellow card) 88'	Report	Choi Hyo-Jin (yellow card) 16'	Stadium: Jeonju World Cup Stadium; Attendance: 8,805; Referee: Kim Dong-Jin

11 July 20	Jeonbuk	0 – 0	Seoul	Jeonju, Jeonbuk
19:00	Sim Woo-Yeon (yellow card) 84'	Report	Ha Dae-Sung (yellow card) 81'	Stadium: Jeonju World Cup Stadium; Attendance: 14,791; Referee: Lee Jong-Kuk

14 July 21	Suwon	0 – 3	Jeonbuk	Suwon, Gyeonggi
19:00	Lee Yong-Rae (yellow card) 10'; Shin Se-Gye (yellow card) 26'	Report	Eninho 28' (pen.); Jung Hoon (yellow card) 29'; Kim Jung-Woo (yellow card) 74'; Lee Seung-Hyun 77'; Choi Eun-Sung (yellow card) 84'; Luiz Henrique (yellow card) 86' (goal) 88'	Stadium: Suwon World Cup Stadium; Attendance: 17,645; Referee: Choi Myung-Yong

22 July 22	Jeonbuk	2 – 1	Gangwon	Jeonju, Jeonbuk
17:00	Kim Jung-Woo 7'; Lee Dong-Gook 27' (pen.)	Report	Kim Eun-Jung 66' (pen.)	Stadium: Jeonju World Cup Stadium; Attendance: 12,248; Referee: Lee Dong-Jun

25 July 23	Seongnam	0 – 0	Jeonbuk	Seongnam, Gyeonggi
19:30	Kim Sang-Sik (yellow card) 23'; Park Won-Jae (yellow card) 61'	Report(Kor); Report(Eng)	Namgung Woong (yellow card) 62'; Javier Reina (yellow card) 72'; Park Jin-Po (yellow card) 82'	Stadium: Tancheon Sports Complex; Attendance: 4,215; Referee: Yoo Sun-Ho

28 July 24	Chunnam	2 – 3	Jeonbuk	Gwangyang, Jeonnam
19:00	Robert Cornthwaite 25'; Hong Jin-Gi (yellow card) 42'; Lúcio Flávio (yellow card) 78'; Henan Silveira 82'	Report(Kor); Report(Eng)	Eninho 57' (pen.) (yellow card) 64'; Seo Sang-Min 71'; Lee Seung-Hyun 90+1' (yellow card) 90+3'	Stadium: Gwangyang Football Stadium; Attendance: 2,449; Referee: Lee Min-Hu

5 August 25	Jeonbuk	0 – 1	Daejeon	Jeonju, Jeonbuk
19:00	Jin Kyung-Sun (yellow card) 77'	Report(Eng); Report(Kor)	Lee Woong-Hee (yellow card) 37'; Hwang Myung-Gyu (yellow card) 60'; Kevin Oris 65'	Stadium: Jeonju World Cup Stadium; Attendance: 10,463; Referee: Ahn Yong-Hee

8 August 26	Jeonbuk	2 – 0	Pohang	Jeonju, Jeonbuk
19:00	Eninho 17'; Lee Dong-Gook (yellow card) 58' (goal) 79'; Lee Seung-Hyun (yellow card) 66'	Report(Eng); Report(Kor)	Shin Jin-Ho (red card) 71'; Kim Won-Il (yellow card) 75'	Stadium: Jeonju World Cup Stadium; Attendance: 6,034; Referee: Lee Jong-Kuk

11 August 27	Busan	0 – 0	Jeonbuk	Yeonje-gu, Busan
19:00		Report(Eng); Report(Kor)	Leonardo (yellow card) 50'; Kim Hyun (yellow card) 90+4'	Stadium: Busan Asiad Stadium; Attendance: 3,583; Referee: Kim Sung-Ho

19 August 28	Jeonbuk	–	Jeju	Jeonju, Jeonbuk
19:00				Stadium: Jeonju World Cup Stadium

==== League table ====
Pos	Team	Pld	W	D	L	GF	GA	GD	Pts	Qualification or relegation
1	FC Seoul (C)	44	29	9	6	76	42	+34	96	Qualification for the Champions League (Note: Pohang Steelers finished the league in third place after qualifying for the Champions League as winners of the FA Cup: therefore, the spot given to the third-placed team was passed to the Suwon Samsung Bluewings, the fourth-placed team.)
2	Jeonbuk Hyundai Motors	44	22	13	9	82	49	+33	79	Qualification for the Champions League
3	Pohang Steelers	44	23	8	13	72	47	+25	77	Qualification for the Champions League
4	Suwon Samsung Bluewings	44	20	13	11	61	51	+10	73	Qualification for the Champions League
5	Ulsan Hyundai	44	18	14	12	60	52	+8	68	

Source: K League
Rules for classification: 1) Points; 2) Goal difference; 3) Goals scored.
(C) Champions

==== Results summary ====
Overall								Home						Away					
Pld	W	D	L	GF	GA	GD	Pts	W	D	L	GF	GA	GD	W	D	L	GF	GA	GD
27	17	6	4	55	24	+31	57	8	3	2	27	14	+13	9	3	2	28	10	+18

==== Results by round ====
Round	1	2	3	4	5	6	7	8	9	10	11	12	13	14	15	16	17	18	19	20	21	22	23	24	25	26	27	28	29	30	31	32	33	34	35	36	37	38	39	40	41	42	43	44
Ground	H	A	H	A	H	A	A	H	A	H	A	H	A	H	A	A	H	A	H	H	A	H	A	A	H	H	A	H	H	A														
Result	W	W	D	L	L	W	W	D	L	W	D	W	W	W	W	W	W	W	W	D	W	W	D	W	L	W	D																	
Position	3	2	4	6	8	7	5	5	5	5	6	6	4	4	3	2	1	1	1	1	1	1	1	1	1	1	2																	

Updated to match(es) played on 12 August 2012. Source: League Fixtures and Results
A = Away; H = Home; W = Win; D = Draw; L = Loss

=== Korean FA Cup ===
23 May Round of 32	Jeonbuk	3 – 1	Cheonan City	Jeonju, Jeonbuk
19:00 KST	Eninho 22' (Free kick); Jeong Shung-Hoon 37' (Assist by No.30); Lee Gang-Jin 71' (Assist by No.9)		Kim Bon-Kwang 80' (pen.)	Stadium: Jeonju World Cup Stadium; Attendance: 1,892; Referee: Seo Dong-Jin

20 June Round of 16	Jeonbuk	1 – 0	Chunnam	Jeonju, Jeonbuk
19:00 KST	Lee Dong-Gook 44' (Assist by No.10)			Stadium: Jeonju World Cup Stadium; Attendance: 5,773; Referee: Kim Hee-Gon

1 August Quarterfinal	Pohang	3 – 2	Jeonbuk	Pohang, Gyeongbuk
19:30 KST	No Byung-Jun 12'; Kim Gwang-Seok 38'; Hwang Jin-Sung 74'		Lee Dong-Gook 5'; Seo Sang-Min 62'	Stadium: Pohang Steel Yard

=== AFC Champions League ===
==== Group stage ====
Pos	Team	Pld	W	D	L	GF	GA	GD	Pts	Qualification	GEG	KSR	JHM	BRU
1	(China) Guangzhou Evergrande	6	3	1	2	12	8	+4	10 (Note: Guangzhou Evergrande and Kashiwa Reysol are ranked by their head-to-head record (Guangzhou Evergrande: 4 pts; Kashiwa Reysol: 1 pt).)	Advance to knockout stage	—	3–1	1–3	1–2
2	(Japan) Kashiwa Reysol	6	3	1	2	11	7	+4	10	Advance to knockout stage	0–0	—	5–1	1–0
3	(South Korea) Jeonbuk Hyundai Motors	6	3	0	3	10	15	−5	9		1–5	0–2	—	3–2
4	(Thailand) Buriram United	6	2	0	4	8	11	−3	6		1–2	3–2	0–2	—

Source: WorldFootball.net
Notes:

7 March Match 1	Jeonbuk Hyundai Motors (South Korea)	1 – 5	(China) Guangzhou Evergrande	Jeonju, South Korea
19:00 UTC+9	Jeong Shung-Hoon 70' (Assist by No.20)	Report	Cléo 27', 69'; Conca 41', 73'; Muriqui 76'	Stadium: Jeonju World Cup Stadium; Attendance: 7,978; Referee: Saeid Mozaffarizadeh (Iran)

21 March Match 2	Kashiwa Reysol (Japan)	5 – 1	(South Korea) Jeonbuk Hyundai Motors	Kashiwa, Japan
19:00 UTC+9	Nasu 40'; Leandro Domingues 45' (pen.), 45+1'; Tanaka 89'; Barada 90+3'	Report	Huang Bowen 51'	Stadium: Hitachi Kashiwa Soccer Stadium; Attendance: 8,175; Referee: Peter Green (Australia)

4 April Match 3	Buriram United (Thailand)	0 – 2	(South Korea) Jeonbuk Hyundai Motors	Buriram, Thailand
18:30 UTC+7		Report	Lee Seung-Hyun 9'; Seo Sang-Min 34' (Assist by No.25)	Stadium: Thunder Castle Stadium; Attendance: 22,770; Referee: Nawaf Shukralla (Bahrain)

17 April Match 4	Jeonbuk Hyundai Motors (South Korea)	3 – 2	(Thailand) Buriram United	Jeonju, South Korea
19:00 UTC+9	Lee Dong-Gook 25'; Lee Dong-Gook 27' (Assist by No.2); Park Won-Jae 80'	Report	Ohandza 20', 56'	Stadium: Jeonju World Cup Stadium; Attendance: 6,432; Referee: Mohamed Al Zarooni (UAE)

1 May Match 5	Guangzhou Evergrande (China)	1 – 3	(South Korea) Jeonbuk Hyundai Motors	Guangzhou, China PR
19:30 UTC+8	Conca 10' (pen.)	Report	Lee Seung-Hyun 43'; Cho Sung-Hwan (yellow card) 42' (yellow-red card) 65'; Lee Dong-Gook 90+1' (Assist by No.21); Lee Dong-Gook 90+3' (pen.)	Stadium: Tianhe Stadium; Attendance: 47,869; Referee: Valentin Kovalenko (Uzbekistan)

15 May Match 6	Jeonbuk Hyundai Motors (South Korea)	0 – 2	(Japan) Kashiwa Reysol	Jeonju, South Korea
19:00 UTC+9		Report	Leandro Domingues 49'; Tanaka 62'	Stadium: Jeonju World Cup Stadium; Attendance: 11,459; Referee: Ali Abdulnabi (Bahrain)

== Squad statistics ==
=== Appearances ===
Statistics accurate as of match played 27 June 2012

No.	Nat.	Pos.	Name	League		FA Cup		Champions League		Appearances		Goals
No.	Nat.	Pos.	Name	Apps	Goals	Apps	Goals	Apps	Goals	App (sub)	Total	Goals
1	(South Korea)	GK	Kim Min-Sik	8 (1)	0	1	0	5	0	14 (1)	15	0
2	(South Korea)	MF	Jeon Kwang-Hwan	8 (1)	0	0	0	3	0	11 (1)	12	0
3	(South Korea)	DF	Sim Woo-Yeon	8 (1)	0	1	0	0 (1)	0	9 (2)	11	0
4	(South Korea)	MF	Kim Sang-Sik	9 (4)	0	2	0	6	0	17 (4)	21	0
5	(South Korea)	DF	Son Seung-Joon	0	0	0	0	0	0	0	0	0
6	(South Korea)	DF	Jin Kyung-Sun	4	0	2	0	4	0	10 (0)	10	0
7	(South Korea)	DF	Lee Gang-Jin	0	0	1	1	0	0	1 (0)	1	1
8	(Brazil)	MF	Eninho	15 (1)	9	1 (1)	1	5 (1)	0	21 (3)	24	10
9	(South Korea)	FW	Jeong Shung-Hoon	7 (6)	2	1	1	0 (3)	1	8 (9)	17	4
10	(Brazil)	MF	Luiz Henrique	10 (2)	2	2	0	2 (2)	0	14 (4)	18	2
11	(South Korea)	MF	Lee Seung-Hyun	6 (7)	2	2	0	4 (1)	2	12 (8)	20	4
13	(South Korea)	MF	Jung Hoon	10 (3)	0	1	0	4	0	15 (3)	18	0
14	(South Korea)	MF	Kim Jung-Woo	12 (1)	4	0 (1)	0	4 (1)	0	16 (3)	19	4
15	(South Korea)	FW	Kim Dong-Chan	1 (6)	1	0 (1)	0	0 (1)	0	1 (8)	9	1
16	(South Korea)	DF	Cho Sung-Hwan	9	0	0	0	3	0	12 (0)	12	0
17	(South Korea)	DF	Lim You-Hwan	11	1	1	0	3	0	15 (0)	15	1
18	(China)	MF	Huang Bowen	7 (2)	1	1	0	2 (1)	1	10 (3)	13	2
19	(Chile)	MF	Hugo Droguett	11 (5)	6	0 (1)	0	1 (2)	0	12 (8)	20	6
20	(South Korea)	FW	Lee Dong-Gook	13 (3)	12	1	1	5 (1)	4	19 (4)	23	17
21	(South Korea)	MF	Seo Sang-Min	10 (2)	2	1	0	4 (1)	1	15 (3)	18	3
22	(South Korea)	GK	Choi Eun-Sung	10	0	1	0	0	0	11 (0)	11	0
23	(South Korea)	DF	Kim Jae-Hwan	1	0	0 (1)	0	1	0	2 (1)	3	0
24	(South Korea)	MF	Park Se-Jik	1 (2)	0	0	0	0	0	1 (2)	3	0
25	(South Korea)	DF	Choi Chul-Soon	10 (1)	0	2	0	4 (1)	0	16 (2)	18	0
27	(South Korea)	DF	Oh Jong-Cheol	0	0	0	0	0	0	0	0	0
29	(South Korea)	MF	Kim Woo-Cheol	0	0	0 (1)	0	0	0	0 (1)	1	0
30	(South Korea)	MF	Kim Hyun	1 (3)	1	1	0	0	0	2 (3)	5	1
31	(South Korea)	GK	Hong Jeong-Nam	0	0	0	0	0	0	0	0	0
32	(South Korea)	MF	Kang Kyung-Won	0	0	0	0	0	0	0	0	0
33	(South Korea)	DF	Park Won-Jae	16	0	0	0	5	1	21 (0)	21	1
34	(South Korea)	MF	Lee Dong-Min	0	0	0	0	0	0	0	0	0
35	(South Korea)	DF	Kang Joo-Ho	0 (1)	0	0	0	0	0	0 (1)	1	0
36	(South Korea)	MF	Lee Hyung-Gi	0	0	0	0	0	0	0	0	0
37	(South Korea)	MF	Shin Hak-Seob	0	0	0	0	0	0	0	0	0
38	(South Korea)	FW	Jung Jae-Won	0	0	0	0	0	0	0	0	0
39	(South Korea)	MF	Hong Joo-Bin	0	0	0	0	0 (1)	0	0 (1)	1	0
40	(South Korea)	MF	Yoon Dong-Gyu	0	0	0	0	0	0	0	0	0
41	(South Korea)	GK	Lee Bum-Soo	0	0	0	0	1	0	1 (0)	1	0

=== Goals and assists ===
Rank	Nation	Number	Name	K-League		KFA Cup		Champions League		Sum		Total
Rank	Nation	Number	Name	Goals	Assists	Goals	Assists	Goals	Assists	Goals	Assists	Total
1	(South Korea)	20	Lee Dong-Gook	12	3	1	0	4	1	17	4	21
2	(Brazil)	8	Eninho	9	6	1	0	0	0	10	6	16
3	(Chile)	19	Hugo Droguett	6	7	0	0	0	0	6	7	13
4	(South Korea)	9	Jeong Shung-Hoon	2	2	1	1	1	0	4	3	7
=	(South Korea)	21	Seo Sang-Min	2	3	0	0	1	1	3	4	7
=	(Brazil)	10	Luiz Henrique	2	4	0	1	0	0	2	5	7
5	(South Korea)	14	Kim Jung-Woo	4	1	0	0	0	0	4	1	5
6	(South Korea)	11	Lee Seung-Hyun	2	0	0	0	2	0	4	0	4
=	(China)	18	Huang Bowen	1	2	0	0	1	0	2	2	4
7	(South Korea)	30	Kim Hyun	1	0	0	1	0	0	1	1	2
=	(South Korea)	33	Park Won-Jae	0	1	0	0	1	0	1	1	2
8	(South Korea)	15	Kim Dong-Chan	1	0	0	0	0	0	1	0	1
=	(South Korea)	17	Lim You-Hwan	1	0	0	0	0	0	1	0	1
=	(South Korea)	7	Lee Gang-Jin	0	0	1	0	0	0	1	0	1
=	(South Korea)	6	Jin Kyung-Sun	0	1	0	0	0	0	0	1	1
=	(South Korea)	16	Cho Sung-Hwan	0	1	0	0	0	0	0	1	1
=	(South Korea)	2	Jeon Kwang-Hwan	0	0	0	0	0	1	0	1	1
=	(South Korea)	25	Choi Chul-Soon	0	0	0	0	0	1	0	1	1
/	/	/	Own Goals	0	-	0	-	0	-	0	-	0
/	/	/	TOTALS	43	31	4	3	10	4	57	38	

=== Discipline ===
Position	Nation	Number	Name	K-League		KFA Cup		Champions League		Total	
Position	Nation	Number	Name	Yellow card	Red card	Yellow card	Red card	Yellow card	Red card	Yellow card	Red card
GK	(South Korea)	1	Kim Min-Sik	0	0	0	0	1	0	1	0
DF	(South Korea)	3	Sim Woo-Yeon	1	0	1	0	0	0	2	0
MF	(South Korea)	4	Kim Sang-Sik	2	0	1	0	0	0	3	0
DF	(South Korea)	6	Jin Kyung-Sun	0	0	1	0	3	0	4	0
MF	(Brazil)	8	Eninho	4	0	0	0	1	0	5	0
FW	(South Korea)	9	Jeong Shung-Hoon	2	0	0	0	0	0	2	0
MF	(South Korea)	11	Lee Seung-Hyun	1	0	0	0	0	0	1	0
MF	(South Korea)	13	Jung Hoon	3	0	0	0	2	0	5	0
FW	(South Korea)	15	Kim Dong-Chan	1	0	0	0	0	0	1	0
DF	(South Korea)	16	Cho Sung-Hwan	3	0	0	0	2	1	5	1
DF	(South Korea)	17	Lim You-Hwan	4	0	0	0	1	0	5	0
MF	(China)	18	Huang Bowen	1	0	0	0	1	0	2	0
MF	(Chile)	19	Hugo Droguett	1	0	0	0	0	0	1	0
FW	(South Korea)	20	Lee Dong-Gook	3	0	0	0	0	0	3	0
MF	(South Korea)	21	Seo Sang-Min	3	0	0	0	0	0	3	0
DF	(South Korea)	25	Choi Chul-Soon	0	0	0	0	2	0	2	0
MF	(South Korea)	30	Kim Hyun	1	0	0	0	0	0	1	0
DF	(South Korea)	33	Park Won-Jae	3	0	0	0	3	0	6	0
/	/	/	TOTALS	33	0	3	0	16	1	52	1
