= 2011 Jeonbuk Hyundai Motors season =

Jeonbuk Hyundai Motors
2011 season
- Chairman: Chung Mong-Koo
- Manager: Choi Kang-Hee
- K-League: Champions
- Korean FA Cup: Round of 16
- League Cup: Quarterfinal
- Champions League: Runners-up
- Top goalscorer: League: Lee Dong-Gook (16); All: Lee Dong-Gook (25)
- Highest home attendance: 41,805 vs Al-Sadd (November 5)
- Lowest home attendance: 1,273 vs Kyunghee Univ. (May 18)
- Average home league attendance: 14,564
Home colours	Away colours

The 2011 Jeonbuk Hyundai Motors season is the club's eighteenth season in the K-League. The club is competing in the K-League, League Cup, Korean FA Cup, and the AFC Champions League.

== Current squad ==
Note: Flags indicate national team as defined under FIFA eligibility rules; some limited exceptions apply. Players may hold more than one non-FIFA nationality.

No.	Pos.	Nation	Player
3	FW	KOR	Sim Woo-Yeon
4	DF	KOR	Kim Sang-Sik
5	DF	KOR	Son Seung-Joon
6	DF	KOR	Jin Kyung-Sun
7	MF	KOR	Kim Young-Woo
8	MF	BRA	Eninho
9	FW	KOR	Jeong Shung-Hoon
10	MF	BRA	Luiz Henrique
11	MF	KOR	Lee Seung-Hyun
13	MF	KOR	Jung Hoon
15	FW	KOR	Kim Dong-Chan
16	DF	KOR	Cho Sung-Hwan (captain)
17	MF	KOR	Lim You-Hwan
18	MF	CHN	Huang Bowen
19	FW	CRO	Krunoslav Lovrek
20	FW	KOR	Lee Dong-Gook
21	GK	KOR	Kim Min-Sik
22	MF	KOR	Kim Hyeung-Bum

No.	Pos.	Nation	Player
24	MF	KOR	Ha Sung-Min
25	DF	KOR	Choi Chul-Soon
26	MF	KOR	Seo Jung-Jin
27	MF	KOR	Kim Ji-Woong
28	MF	KOR	Park Jung-Hoon
29	DF	KOR	Lee Kwang-Hyun
30	MF	KOR	Jeon Kwang-Hwan
31	GK	KOR	Hong Jeong-Nam
32	DF	KOR	Kim Jae-Hwan
33	MF	KOR	Park Won-Jae
34	DF	KOR	Kim Min-Hak
35	DF	KOR	Oh Jong-Cheol
36	DF	KOR	Kim Seung-Rok
37	DF	KOR	Im Dong-Jun
38	DF	KOR	Kim Kyung-Min
39	MF	KOR	Kang Kyung-Won
40	DF	KOR	Kim Hak-Jin
41	GK	KOR	Lee Bum-Soo

== Match results ==
=== K-League ===
Date Round	Home	Score	Away	Location

6 March 1	Jeonbuk Hyundai Motors	0–1	Chunnam Dragons	Jeonju, Jeonbuk
15:00 UTC+9		Report	Gong Young-Sun 22'	Stadium: Jeonju World Cup Stadium; Attendance: 17,932; Referee: Lee Sam-Ho

12 March 2	Seongnam Ilhwa Chunma	0–1	Jeonbuk Hyundai Motors	Seongnam, Gyeonggi
15:00 UTC+9		Report	Sim Woo-Yeon 35'	Stadium: Tancheon Sports Complex; Attendance: 9,571; Referee: Lee Min-Hu

20 March 3	Jeonbuk Hyundai Motors	5–2	Busan I'Park	Jeonju, Jeonbuk
15:00 UTC+9	Lee Dong-Gook 32', 64'; Kim Ji-Woong 41'; Lee Seung-Hyun 73'; Jeong Shung-Hoon 79'	Report	Yang Dong-Hyun 18'; Lim Sang-Hyub 30' (yellow card) 31' (yellow-red card) 60'	Stadium: Jeonju World Cup Stadium; Attendance: 9,747; Referee: Choi Myung-Yong

2 April 4	FC Seoul	3–1	Jeonbuk Hyundai Motors	Mapo-gu, Seoul
17:00 UTC+9	Damjanović 20', 85'; Molina 22'	Report	Lee Dong-Gook 80'	Stadium: Seoul World Cup Stadium; Attendance: 27,406; Referee: Yoo Seon-Ho

10 April 5	Jeonbuk Hyundai Motors	0–0	Suwon Samsung Bluewings	Jeonju, Jeonbuk
15:00 UTC+9		Report		Stadium: Jeonju World Cup Stadium; Attendance: 26,597; Referee: Choi Kwang-Bo

16 April 6	Jeonbuk Hyundai Motors	6–1	Gwangju	Jeonju, Jeonbuk
15:00 UTC+9	Kim Ji-Woong 17'; Kim Dong-Chan 27'; Lee Seung-Hyun 30'; Lee Dong-Gook 39'; Huang Bowen 42'; Lovrek 79'	Report	João Paulo 86'	Stadium: Jeonju World Cup Stadium; Attendance: 8,455; Referee: Lee Jong-Guk

24 April 7	Daegu	1–2	Jeonbuk Hyundai Motors	Buk-gu, Daegu
15:00 UTC+9	Quirino 67'	Report	Kim Dong-Chan 23'; Kim Ji-Woong 38'	Stadium: Daegu Civil Stadium; Attendance: 6,348; Referee: Yoo Seon-Ho

30 April 8	Incheon United	2–6	Jeonbuk Hyundai Motors	Seo-gu, Incheon
19:00 UTC+9	Han Kyo-Won 1'; Bae Hyo-Sung 81'	Report	Lim You-Hwan 10'; Lee Dong-Gook 13', 69'; Eninho 56'; Jeong Shung-Hoon 77'; Kim Dong-Chan 90'	Stadium: Incheon Munhak Stadium; Attendance: 1,127; Referee: Ryu Hee-Seon

7 May 9	Jeonbuk Hyundai Motors	1–0	Ulsan Hyundai	Jeonju, Jeonbuk
17:00 UTC+9	Kim Dong-Chan 51'	Report		Stadium: Jeonju World Cup Stadium; Attendance: 22,723; Referee: Lim Won-Taek

15 May 10	Pohang Steelers	3–2	Jeonbuk Hyundai Motors	Pohang, Gyeongbuk
15:00 UTC+9	Shin Hyung-Min 56'; Chuva 72', 79' (pen.)	Report	Jung Hoon (yellow card) 23' (yellow-red card) 64'; Lee Dong-Gook 37'; Park Won-Jae 42'	Stadium: Steelyard Stadium; Attendance: 16,732; Referee: Choi Kwang-Bo

21 May 11	Jeonbuk Hyundai Motors	1–0	Gangwon	Jeonju, Jeonbuk
17:00 UTC+9	Lovrek 24'	Report		Stadium: Jeonju World Cup Stadium; Attendance: 8,720; Referee: Woo Sang-Il

29 May 12	Daejeon Citizen	2–3	Jeonbuk Hyundai Motors	Yuseong-gu, Daejeon
15:00 UTC+9	Hwang Jin-San 18'; Park Sung-Ho 37' (pen.)	Report	Lee Dong-Gook 27', 83'; Lee Seung-Hyun 90'	Stadium: Daejeon World Cup Stadium; Attendance: 12,241; Referee: Kim Jong-Hyuk

11 June 13	Jeonbuk Hyundai Motors	2–0	Gyeongnam	Jeonju, Jeonbuk
17:00 UTC+9	Eninho 27'; Lee Dong-Gook 73'	Report	Jung Da-Hwon (yellow card) 26' (yellow-red card) 62'	Stadium: Jeonju World Cup Stadium; Attendance: 14,115; Referee: Choi Myung-Yong

18 June 14	Jeonbuk Hyundai Motors	3–2	Jeju United	Jeonju, Jeonbuk
19:00 UTC+9	Eninho 64'; Kim In-Ho 82' (o.g.); Luiz Henrique 88'	Report	Santos 10', 65'	Stadium: Jeonju World Cup Stadium; Attendance: 15,939; Referee: Choi Kwang-Bo

25 June 15	Sangju Sangmu Phoenix	0–3	Jeonbuk Hyundai Motors	Sangju, Gyeongbuk
19:00 UTC+9		Report	Cho Sung-Hwan 18'; Luiz 32'; Lee Seung-Hyun 86'	Stadium: Sangju Stadium; Attendance: 4,765; Referee: Lee Sam-Ho

3 July 16	Jeonbuk Hyundai Motors	2–2	FC Seoul	Jeonju, Jeonbuk
19:00 UTC+9	Eninho 29' (pen.) (yellow card) 17' (yellow-red card) 30'; Lee Seung-Hyun 45+1'; Lovrek (yellow card) 75' (yellow-red card) 78'	Report	Kang Jung-Hoon 80'; Damjanović 81'	Stadium: Jeonju World Cup Stadium; Attendance: 15,879; Referee: Choi Myung-Yong

10 July 17	Ulsan Hyundai	0–0	Jeonbuk Hyundai Motors	Nam-gu, Ulsan
19:00 UTC+9		Report		Stadium: Munsu Cup Stadium; Attendance: 10,572; Referee: Lee Jong-Guk

16 July 18	Gwangju	1–1	Jeonbuk Hyundai Motors	Seo-gu, Gwangju
19:00 UTC+9	Lee Seung-Ki 57'	Report	Kim Soo-Beom 62' (o.g.)	Stadium: Gwangju World Cup Stadium; Attendance: 3,248; Referee: Lim Won-Taek

24 July 19	Jeonbuk Hyundai Motors	2–0	Seongnam Ilhwa Chunma	Jeonju, Jeonbuk
19:00 UTC+9	Jeong Ho-Jeong 15' (o.g.); Kim Dong-Chan 63'	Report		Stadium: Jeonju World Cup Stadium; Attendance: 16,298; Referee: Lee Sam-Ho

6 August 20	Gangwon	0–3	Jeonbuk Hyundai Motors	Gangneung, Gangwon
19:00 UTC+9		Report	Kim Dong-Chan (0:39), 7', 18'	Stadium: Gangneung Stadium; Attendance: 2,017; Referee: Lee Min-Hoo

13 August 21	Jeonbuk Hyundai Motors	2–2	Daegu	Jeonju, Jeonbuk
19:00 UTC+9	Eninho 38'; Sim Woo-Yeon 70'	Report	Kim Hyun-Sung 58'; Matheus 87'	Stadium: Jeonju World Cup Stadium; Attendance: 14,914; Referee: Yoo Seon-Ho

21 August 22	Jeonbuk Hyundai Motors	3–1	Pohang Steelers	Jeonju, Jeonbuk
19:00 UTC+9	Lee Dong-Gook 64' (pen.), 78', 90+1'	Report	Shin Kwang-Hoon (yellow card) 44' (yellow-red card) 62'; No Byung-Jun 68'	Stadium: Jeonju World Cup Stadium; Attendance: 21,253; Referee: Kim Sung-Ho

27 August 23	Busan I'Park	2–3	Jeonbuk Hyundai Motors	Yeonje-gu, Busan
19:00 UTC+9	Han Sang-Woon 8'; Fagner 46'	Report	Huang Bowen 39'; Lim You-Hwan 55'; Jeong Shung-Hoon 57'	Stadium: Busan Asiad Stadium; Attendance: 6,695; Referee: Ryu Hee-Sun

9 September 24	Jeonbuk Hyundai Motors	4–2	Incheon United	Jeonju, Jeonbuk
19:00 UTC+9	Eninho 25'; Kim Dong-Chan 56'; Jeong Shung-Hoon 78', 88'	Report	Jung In-Hwan 9'; Elionar 51'	Stadium: Jeonju World Cup Stadium; Attendance: 8,334; Referee: Moon Jin-Hee

18 September 25	Gyeongnam	1–3	Jeonbuk Hyundai Motors	Changwon, Gyeongnam
19:00 UTC+9	Kang Seung-Jo 41'	Report	Seo Jung-Jin 20'; Lee Dong-Gook 32' (pen.); Luiz 36'	Stadium: Changwon Football Center; Attendance: 10,536; Referee: Lee Jong-Guk

24 September 26	Jeju United	0–0	Jeonbuk Hyundai Motors	Seogwipo, Jeju
15:00 UTC+9		Report		Stadium: Jeju World Cup Stadium; Attendance: 7,059; Referee: Lee Min-Hu

3 October 27	Jeonbuk Hyundai Motors	5–1	Sangju Sangmu Phoenix	Jeonju, Jeonbuk
15:00 UTC+9	Lee Dong-Gook 27', 87'; Lee Seung-Hyun 45+1', 59'; Eninho 65'	Report	Kim Chi-Gon (red card) 41'; Lee Sung-Jae 53'	Stadium: Jeonju World Cup Stadium; Attendance: 11,609; Referee: Hong Jin-Ho

8 October 28	Suwon Samsung Bluewings	2–2	Jeonbuk Hyundai Motors	Suwon, Gyeonggi
15:00 UTC+9	Yeom Ki-Hun 20'; Neretljak 33' (pen.)	Report	Choi Chul-Soon 16'; Eninho 84'	Stadium: Suwon World Cup Stadium; Attendance: 13,004; Referee: Ko Keum-Bok

22 October 29	Jeonbuk Hyundai Motors	0–0	Daejeon Citizen	Jeonju, Jeonbuk
15:00 UTC+9	Kim Jae-Hwan (yellow card) 37' (yellow-red card) 52'	Report		Stadium: Jeonju World Cup Stadium; Attendance: 13,721; Referee: Lee Jong-Guk

30 October 30	Chunnam Dragons	1–1	Jeonbuk Hyundai Motors	Gwangyang, Jeonnam
15:00 UTC+9	Kim Myung-Joong 17'	Report	Kim Dong-Chan 65'	Stadium: Gwangyang Stadium; Attendance: 10,115; Referee: Lee Sam-Ho

==== League table ====
Pos	Team	Pld	W	D	L	GF	GA	GD	Pts	Qualification
1	Jeonbuk Hyundai Motors	30	18	9	3	67	32	+35	63	Qualification for the K League playoffs final
2	Pohang Steelers	30	17	8	5	59	33	+26	59	Qualification for the K League playoffs semi-final
3	FC Seoul	30	16	7	7	56	38	+18	55	Qualification for the K League playoffs first round
4	Suwon Samsung Bluewings	30	17	4	9	51	33	+18	55	Qualification for the K League playoffs first round
5	Busan IPark	30	13	7	10	49	43	+6	46	Qualification for the K League playoffs first round

Source: K League
Rules for classification: 1) Points; 2) Goal difference; 3) Goals scored

Pos	Team	Qualification
1	Jeonbuk Hyundai Motors (C)	Qualification for the Champions League group stage
2	Ulsan Hyundai	Qualification for the Champions League group stage
3	Pohang Steelers	Qualification for the Champions League playoff round
4	Suwon Samsung Bluewings	
5	FC Seoul	
6	Busan IPark	

Source: RSSSF
(C) Champions

==== Results summary ====
Overall								Home						Away					
Pld	W	D	L	GF	GA	GD	Pts	W	D	L	GF	GA	GD	W	D	L	GF	GA	GD
30	18	9	3	67	32	+35	63	10	4	1	36	14	+22	8	5	2	31	18	+13

==== Results by round ====
Round	1	2	3	4	5	6	7	8	9	10	11	12	13	14	15	16	17	18	19	20	21	22	23	24	25	26	27	28	29	30
Ground	H	A	H	A	H	H	A	A	H	A	H	A	H	H	A	H	A	A	H	A	H	H	A	H	A	A	H	A	H	A
Result	L	W	W	L	D	W	W	W	W	L	W	W	W	W	W	D	D	D	W	W	D	W	W	W	W	D	W	D	D	D
Position	13	9	5	9	9	5	2	2	1	2	1	1	1	1	1	1	1	1	1	1	1	1	1	1	1	1	1	1	1	1

Updated to match(es) played on 30 October 2011. Source: League Fixtures and Results
A = Away; H = Home; W = Win; D = Draw; L = Loss

=== K-League Championship ===
30 November Final 1st leg	Ulsan Hyundai	1–2	Jeonbuk Hyundai Motors	Nam-gu, Ulsan
18:10 UTC+9	Kwak Tae-Hwi 63'	Report	Eninho 52' (pen.), 79'	Stadium: Ulsan Munsu Football Stadium; Attendance: 25,375; Referee: Lee Sam-Ho

4 December Final 2nd leg	Jeonbuk Hyundai Motors	2–1	Ulsan Hyundai	Jeonju, Jeonbuk
13:30 UTC+9	Eninho 59' (pen.); Luiz 68'	Report	Seol Ki-Hyeon 56'	Stadium: Jeonju World Cup Stadium; Attendance: 33,554; Referee: Choi Kwang-Bo

=== Korean FA Cup ===
18 May Round of 32	Jeonbuk Hyundai Motors	2–1	Kyunghee University	Jeonju, Jeonbuk
19:00 UTC+9	Eninho 47'; Luiz Henrique 59'		Kim Hwan-Hee 13'	Stadium: Jeonju World Cup Stadium; Attendance: 1,273; Referee: Seo Dong-Jin

15 June Round of 16	Jeonbuk Hyundai Motors	1–2	Busan I'Park	Jeonju, Jeonbuk
19:00 UTC+9	Cho Sung-Hwan 4' (yellow card) 31' (yellow-red card) 70'		Han Sang-Woon 55', 64'	Stadium: Jeonju World Cup Stadium; Attendance: 4,328; Referee: Ko Hyung-Jin

=== League Cup ===
29 June Quarterfinal	Ulsan Hyundai	4–1	Jeonbuk Hyundai Motors	Nam-gu, Ulsan
19:00 UTC+9	Kim Shin-Wook 26', 30'; Choi Jae-Soo 41'; Jung Dae-Sun 53'	Report	Park Jung-Hoon 20'	Stadium: Munsu Cup Stadium; Attendance: 2,153; Referee: Ryu Hee-Sun

=== AFC Champions League ===
==== Group round ====
Pos	Team	Pld	W	D	L	GF	GA	GD	Pts	Qualification
1	(South Korea) Jeonbuk Hyundai Motors	6	5	0	1	14	2	+12	15	Advance to knockout stage
2	(Japan) Cerezo Osaka	6	4	0	2	11	4	+7	12	Advance to knockout stage
3	(China) Shandong Luneng	6	2	1	3	9	8	+1	7	
4	(Indonesia) Arema	6	0	1	5	2	22	−20	1	

2 March Group Round	Jeonbuk Hyundai Motors (South Korea)	1–0	(China) Shandong Luneng	Jeonju, South Korea
19:00 UTC+9	Park Won-Jae 59'	Report		Stadium: Jeonju World Cup Stadium; Attendance: 3,826; Referee: Peter Green (Australia)

16 March Group Round	Arema FC (Indonesia)	0–4	(South Korea) Jeonbuk Hyundai Motors	Malang, Indonesia
15:30 UTC+7			Kim Ji-Woong 26'; Huang Bowen 77'; Luiz Henrique 81', 89'	Stadium: Kanjuruhan Stadium; Referee: Andre El Haddad (Lebanon)

5 April Group Round	Cerezo Osaka (Japan)	1–0	(South Korea) Jeonbuk Hyundai Motors	Osaka, Japan
19:00 UTC+9	Inui 53'	Report		Stadium: Nagai Stadium; Attendance: 11,351; Referee: Ravshan Irmatov (Uzbekistan)

20 April Group Round	Jeonbuk Hyundai Motors (South Korea)	1–0	(Japan) Cerezo Osaka	Jeonju, South Korea
19:00 UTC+9	Lee Dong-Gook 77'	Report		Stadium: Jeonju World Cup Stadium; Attendance: 7,892; Referee: Mohamed Al Zarooni (UAE)

3 May Group Round	Shandong Luneng (China)	1–2	(South Korea) Jeonbuk Hyundai Motors	Jinan, China PR
19:30 UTC+8	Zhou Haibin 40'	Report	Lee Dong-Gook 31', 53'	Stadium: Shandong Stadium; Attendance: 17,343; Referee: Saeed Mozaffarizadeh (Iran)

10 May Group Round	Jeonbuk Hyundai Motors (South Korea)	6–0	(Indonesia) Arema FC	Jeonju, South Korea
15:00 UTC+9	Lovrek 1', 45+2', 60'; Kim Dong-Chan 9'; Jeong Shung-Hoon 27'; Kang Seung-Jo 77'	Report		Stadium: Jeonju World Cup Stadium; Attendance: 6,439; Referee: Abdulrahman Abdou (Qatar)

==== Knockout round ====
24 May Round of 16	Jeonbuk Hyundai Motors (South Korea)	3–0	(China) Tianjin Teda	Jeonju, South Korea
19:00 UTC+9	Eninho 32', 84'; Lee Seung-Hyun 43'	Report		Stadium: Jeonju World Cup Stadium; Attendance: 5,254; Referee: Ali Al Badwawi (UAE)

14 September Quarter-finals 1st	Cerezo Osaka (Japan)	4–3	(South Korea) Jeonbuk Hyundai Motors	Osaka, Japan
19:30 UTC+9	Bando 29'; Kiyotake 56', 81'; Kim Bo-Kyung 64' (pen.)	Report	Lee Dong-Gook 6', 45+1'; Cho Sung-Hwan 58'	Stadium: Nagai Stadium; Attendance: 15,450; Referee: Tan Hai (China PR)

27 September Quarter-finals 2nd	Jeonbuk Hyundai Motors (South Korea)	6–1	(Japan) Cerezo Osaka	Jeonju, South Korea
19:00 UTC+9	Eninho 31'; Lee Dong-Gook 49', 55', 64', 90+1'; Kim Dong-Chan 76'	Report	Komatsu 72'	Stadium: Jeonju World Cup Stadium; Attendance: 16,423; Referee: Abdulrahman Abdou (Qatar)

19 October Semi-finals 1st	Al-Ittihad (Saudi Arabia)	2–3	(South Korea) Jeonbuk Hyundai Motors	Jeddah, Saudi Arabia
20:05 UTC+3	Hazazi 6', 18'	Report	Eninho 2'; Son Seung-Joon 57'; Cho Sung-Hwan 77'	Stadium: Prince Abdullah al-Faisal Stadium; Attendance: 16,942; Referee: Nawaf Shukralla (Bahrain)

26 October Semi-finals 2nd	Jeonbuk Hyundai Motors (South Korea)	2–1	(Saudi Arabia) Al-Ittihad	Jeonju, South Korea
19:00 UTC+9	Eninho 22', 36'; Lovrek (yellow card) 82' (yellow-red card) 88'	Report	Hazazi (red card) 12'; Wendel 73'	Stadium: Jeonju World Cup Stadium; Attendance: 17,069; Referee: Andre El Haddad (Lebanon)

5 November Final	Jeonbuk Hyundai Motors (South Korea)	2–2 (a.e.t.) (2–4 p)	(Qatar) Al-Sadd	Jeonju, South Korea
19:00 UTC+9	Eninho 17'; Lee Seung-Hyun 90+2'	Report	Sim Woo-Yeon 30' (o.g.); Keïta 61'	Stadium: Jeonju World Cup Stadium; Attendance: 41,805; Referee: Ravshan Irmatov (Uzbekistan)
	Penalties
	Eninho (penalty scored); Kim Dong-Chan (penalty missed); Park Won-Jae (penalty missed); Kim Sang-Sik (penalty scored)		(penalty scored) Niang; (penalty scored) Al Haidos; (penalty missed) Lee Jung-Soo; (penalty scored) Majid; (penalty scored) Belhadj

== Squad statistics ==
=== Appearances and goals ===
Statistics accurate as of match played 4 December 2011
Numbers in parentheses denote appearances as substitute.

No.	Nat.	Pos.	Name	League		FA Cup		League Cup		Champions League		Total	
No.	Nat.	Pos.	Name	Apps	Goals	Apps	Goals	Apps	Goals	Apps	Goals	Apps	Goals
3	KOR	FW	Sim Woo-Yeon	21	2	0	0	0	0	9 (1)	0	30 (1)	2
4	KOR	DF	Kim Sang-Sik	21 (1)	0	0	0	0	0	8	0	29 (1)	0
5	KOR	DF	Son Seung-Joon	4 (4)	0	1	0	1	0	2	1	8 (4)	1
6	KOR	DF	Jin Kyung-Sun	5 (2)	0	2	0	0	0	4	0	11 (2)	0
7	KOR	MF	Kim Young-Woo	7	0	0	0	0	0	1	0	8 (0)	0
8	BRA	MF	Eninho	21 (5)	11	1 (1)	1	0	0	10	7	32 (6)	19
9	KOR	FW	Jeong Shung-Hoon	7 (19)	5	1	0	1	0	5 (4)	1	14 (23)	6
10	BRA	MF	Luiz Henrique	17 (7)	4	1 (1)	1	0	0	9	2	27 (8)	7
11	KOR	MF	Lee Seung-Hyun	17 (12)	7	0	0	0	0	5 (4)	2	22 (16)	9
13	KOR	MF	Jung Hoon	22	0	2	0	0	0	7 (1)	0	31 (1)	0
15	KOR	FW	Kim Dong-Chan	11 (11)	10	1 (1)	0	1	0	5 (7)	2	18 (19)	12
16	KOR	DF	Cho Sung-Hwan	27	1	1	1	0	0	8	2	36 (0)	4
17	KOR	MF	Lim You-Hwan	11	2	2	0	0	0	4 (1)	0	17 (1)	2
18	CHN	MF	Huang Bowen	18 (2)	2	0	0	0	0	4 (1)	1	22 (3)	3
19	CRO	FW	Krunoslav Lovrek	9 (16)	2	1 (1)	0	0	0	2 (7)	3	12 (24)	5
20	KOR	FW	Lee Dong-Gook	26 (3)	16	0 (1)	0	0	0	7 (1)	9	33 (5)	25
21	KOR	GK	Kim Min-Sik	17	0	2	0	0	0	8	0	27 (0)	0
22	KOR	MF	Kim Hyeung-Bum	1 (2)	0	1 (1)	0	0 (1)	0	0 (2)	0	2 (6)	0
23	KOR	MF	Ha Sung-Min	0	0	0	0	1	0	3	0	4 (0)	0
25	KOR	DF	Choi Chul-Soon	23	1	1	0	0	0	7 (1)	0	31 (1)	1
26	KOR	MF	Seo Jung-Jin	4 (5)	1	0	0	0	0	5	0	9 (5)	1
27	KOR	MF	Kim Ji-Woong	12	3	1	0	1	0	1 (1)	1	15 (1)	4
28	KOR	MF	Park Jung-Hoon	0	0	0	0	1	1	1 (1)	0	2 (1)	1
29	KOR	DF	Lee Kwang-Hyun	1 (2)	0	1	0	1	0	1	0	4 (2)	0
30	KOR	MF	Jeon Kwang-Hwan	6	0	1	0	1	0	2 (1)	0	10 (1)	0
31	KOR	GK	Hong Jeong-Nam	0	0	0	0	0	0	0	0	0	0
32	KOR	DF	Kim Jae-Hwan	2	0	0	0	1	0	0 (1)	0	3 (1)	0
33	KOR	MF	Park Won-Jae	27	1	0	0	0	0	8	1	35 (0)	2
34	KOR	DF	Kim Min-Hak	0	0	0	0	1	0	0	0	1 (0)	0
35	KOR	DF	Oh Jong-Cheol	0	0	0	0	0	0	0	0	0	0
36	KOR	DF	Kim Seung-Rok	0	0	0	0	0	0	0	0	0	0
37	KOR	DF	Im Dong-Jun	0	0	0	0	0 (1)	0	0	0	0 (1)	0
38	KOR	DF	Kim Kyung-Min	0	0	0	0	0	0	0	0	0	0
39	KOR	MF	Kang Kyung-Won	0	0	0	0	0	0	0	0	0	0
40	KOR	DF	Kim Hak-Jin	0	0	0	0	0 (1)	0	0	0	0 (1)	0
41	KOR	GK	Lee Bum-Soo	1	0	0	0	1	0	0	0	2 (0)	0
1	KOR	GK	Yeom Dong-Gyun (out)	14	0	0	0	0	0	4	0	18 (0)	0
14	KOR	MF	Kang Seung-Jo (out)	0 (4)	0	2	0	0	0	2 (2)	1	4 (6)	1

=== Top scorers ===
Rank	Nation	Number	Name	K-League	KFA Cup	League Cup	Champions League	Total
1	(South Korea)	20	Lee Dong-Gook	16	0	0	9	25
2	(Brazil)	8	Eninho	11	1	0	7	19
3	(South Korea)	15	Kim Dong-Chan	10	0	0	2	12
4	(South Korea)	11	Lee Seung-Hyun	7	0	0	2	9
5	(Brazil)	10	Luiz Henrique	4	1	0	2	7
6	(South Korea)	9	Jeong Shung-Hoon	5	0	0	1	6
7	(Croatia)	19	Krunoslav Lovrek	2	0	0	3	5
8	(South Korea)	27	Kim Ji-Woong	3	0	0	1	4
=	(South Korea)	16	Cho Sung-Hwan	1	1	0	2	4
9	(China)	18	Huang Bowen	2	0	0	1	3
10	(South Korea)	3	Sim Woo-Yeon	2	0	0	0	2
=	(South Korea)	17	Lim You-Hwan	2	0	0	0	2
=	(South Korea)	33	Park Won-Jae	1	0	0	1	2
11	(South Korea)	25	Choi Chul-Soon	1	0	0	0	1
=	(South Korea)	26	Seo Jung-Jin	1	0	0	0	1
=	(South Korea)	5	Son Seung-Joon	0	0	0	1	1
=	(South Korea)	14	Kang Seung-Jo	0	0	0	1	1
=	(South Korea)	28	Park Jung-Hoon	0	0	1	0	1
/	/	/	Own Goals	3	0	0	0	3
/	/	/	TOTALS	71	3	1	33	108

=== Top assistors ===
Rank	Nation	Number	Name	K-League	KFA Cup	League Cup	Champions League	Total
1	(South Korea)	20	Lee Dong-Gook	15	0	0	0	15
2	(Brazil)	8	Eninho	5	0	0	7	12
3	(South Korea)	9	Jeong Shung-Hoon	5	0	1	1	7
4	(South Korea)	33	Park Won-Jae	4	0	0	1	5
=	(South Korea)	11	Lee Seung-Hyun	3	0	0	2	5
5	(South Korea)	15	Kim Dong-Chan	3	0	0	1	4
=	(Brazil)	10	Luiz Henrique	2	0	0	2	4
=	(Croatia)	19	Krunoslav Lovrek	2	0	0	2	4
=	(South Korea)	26	Seo Jung-Jin	2	0	0	2	4
6	(South Korea)	22	Kim Hyung-Bum	0	1	0	1	2
7	(South Korea)	13	Jung Hoon	1	0	0	0	1
=	(South Korea)	16	Cho Sung-Hwan	1	0	0	0	1
=	(China)	18	Huang Bowen	1	0	0	0	1
=	(South Korea)	25	Choi Chul-Soon	1	0	0	0	1
=	(South Korea)	17	Lim You-Hwan	0	0	0	1	1
=	(South Korea)	24	Ha Sung-Min	0	0	0	1	1
/	/	/	TOTALS	45	1	1	21	68

=== Discipline ===
Position	Nation	Number	Name	K-League		KFA Cup		League Cup		Champions League		Total	
Position	Nation	Number	Name	Yellow card	Red card	Yellow card	Red card	Yellow card	Red card	Yellow card	Red card	Yellow card	Red card
DF	(South Korea)	3	Sim Woo-Yeon	5	0	0	0	0	0	2	0	7	0
DF	(South Korea)	4	Kim Sang-Sik	9	0	0	0	0	0	4	0	13	0
DF	(South Korea)	5	Son Seung-Joon	4	0	1	0	0	0	1	0	6	0
DF	(South Korea)	6	Jin Kyung-Sun	2	0	1	0	0	0	1	0	4	0
MF	(Brazil)	8	Eninho	2	0	0	0	0	0	3	0	5	0
FW	(South Korea)	9	Jeong Shung-Hoon	1	0	0	0	0	0	0	0	1	0
MF	(Brazil)	10	Luiz Henrique	2	0	0	0	0	0	1	0	3	0
MF	(South Korea)	11	Lee Seung-Hyun	1	0	0	0	0	0	0	0	1	0
MF	(South Korea)	13	Jung Hoon	7	1	0	0	0	0	2	0	9	1
MF	(South Korea)	14	Kang Seung-Jo	1	0	1	0	0	0	0	0	2	0
FW	(South Korea)	15	Kim Dong-Chan	3	0	0	0	0	0	1	0	4	0
DF	(South Korea)	16	Cho Sung-Hwan	12	0	2	1	0	0	3	0	17	1
DF	(South Korea)	17	Lim You-Hwan	2	0	0	0	0	0	0	0	2	0
MF	(China)	18	Huang Bowen	4	0	0	0	0	0	2	0	6	0
FW	(Croatia)	19	Krunoslav Lovrek	2	0	1	0	0	0	2	1	5	1
FW	(South Korea)	20	Lee Dong-Gook	2	0	0	0	0	0	0	0	2	0
GK	(South Korea)	21	Kim Min-Sik	2	0	0	0	0	0	1	0	3	0
MF	(South Korea)	23	Ha Sung-Min	0	0	0	0	0	0	1	0	1	0
DF	(South Korea)	25	Choi Chul-Soon	8	0	0	0	0	0	1	0	9	0
MF	(South Korea)	27	Kim Ji-Woong	6	0	0	0	0	0	2	0	8	0
MF	(South Korea)	30	Jeon Kwang-Hwan	1	0	0	0	0	0	0	0	1	0
DF	(South Korea)	32	Kim Jae-Hwan	3	1	0	0	0	0	0	0	3	1
MF	(South Korea)	33	Park Won-Jae	6	0	0	0	0	0	1	0	7	0
/	/	/	TOTALS	85	2	6	1	0	0	28	1	119	4

== Transfer ==
=== In ===
- 3 July 2011 – (South Korea) Kim Young-Woo – Gyeongnam FC

=== Out ===
- 7 July 2011 – (South Korea) Yeom Dong-Gyun – Released (under arrest)
- 28 July 2011 – (South Korea) Kang Seung-Jo – Gyeongnam FC
