= Lee Dong-gook =

South Korean footballer (born 1979)

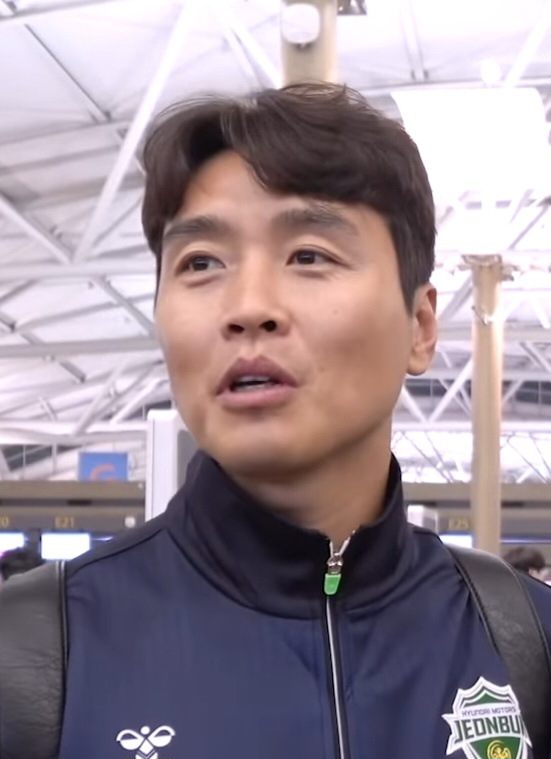
- Lee in 2020

Personal information
- Birth name: Lee Dong-gook
- Date of birth: 29 April 1979 (age 47)
- Place of birth: Pohang, Gyeongbuk, South Korea
- Height: 1.87 m (6 ft 2 in)
- Position: Striker

Youth career
- 1995–1997: Pohang Jecheol Technical High School

Senior career*
| Years | Team | Apps | (Gls) |
| 1998–2007 | Pohang Steelers | 101 | (38) |
| 2000–2001 | → Werder Bremen (loan) | 7 | (0) |
| 2003–2005 | → Gwangju Sangmu (draft) | 46 | (12) |
| 2007–2008 | Middlesbrough | 23 | (0) |
| 2008 | Seongnam Ilhwa Chunma | 10 | (2) |
| 2009–2020 | Jeonbuk Hyundai Motors | 349 | (161) |
| Total | | 536 | (213) |

International career
| 1998–1999 | South Korea U20 | 9 | (6) |
| 1999–2002 | South Korea U23 | 29 | (20) |
| 1998–2017 | South Korea | 105 | (33) |
Medal record
Representing South Korea
Men's football
AFC Asian Cup
| Bronze medal – third place | 2000 Lebanon |
| Bronze medal – third place | 2007 Indonesia/Malaysia /Thailand/Vietnam |
Asian Games
| Bronze medal – third place | 2002 Busan |
AFC Youth Championship
| Winner | 1998 Thailand |
EAFF Championship
| Runner-up | 2010 Japan |
- * Club domestic league appearances and goals

- Lee Dong-gook
- Hangul: 이동국
- Hanja: 李同國
- RR: I Dongguk
- MR: I Tongguk

Lee Dong-gook (Korean: 이동국; Hanja: 李同國; Korean pronunciation: [i.doŋ.ɡuk̚]; born 29 April 1979) is a South Korean former professional footballer who played as a striker. He is a record scorer in the K League 1, and had brief spells in Europe with Werder Bremen and Middlesbrough. He also played for the South Korea national football team at two FIFA World Cups and three AFC Asian Cups.

== Club career ==
=== Pohang Steelers ===
In 1998, Lee joined a K League club Pohang Steelers and started his professional career instead of entering university. Lee was named the Rookie of the Year after scoring eleven goals for Pohang in his first K League season. He also helped Pohang win the Asian Club Championship in that year.

In January 2001, he was sent on loan to a Bundesliga club Werder Bremen, but he failed to settle in Bremen. He played only seven matches as a substitute during six months.

He scored six goals during seven league matches in early 2006 when his performance was at its height. In April 2006, however, he tore the cruciate ligaments in his knee while playing in a league match that forced him out for six months, and was unable to play in the 2006 FIFA World Cup.

==== Enlistment in Gwangju Sangmu ====
In 1998, Lee's father offered a bribe to an employee of the Military Manpower Administration in order to dodge Lee's military service. The conspiracy ended in smoke, and was revealed by the prosecutor's office in October 2001. Lee and his father were criticised for their conspiracy, but the court only ordered the monetary penalty of his father. Lee wasn't punished at all, and even got an opportunity to exempt from military service by participating in the 2002 Asian Games. However, he failed to won a gold medal in the Asian Games despite the special treatment, and had to perform his obligation. In March 2003, he joined the military team Gwangju Sangmu.

=== Middlesbrough ===
In January 2007, after being granted a work permit, Lee signed for Premier League club Middlesbrough on an 18-month contract. On 24 February 2007, he made his debut, coming on as an 85th minute substitute for Yakubu in the 2–1 win against Reading. On 29 August 2007, he scored his first goal against Northampton Town in the 2007–08 Football League Cup. On 26 January 2008, he scored his second goal against Mansfield Town in the 2007–08 FA Cup. However, he didn't score during 23 appearances in the Premier League and disappointed English fans. His contract expired at the end of the 2007–08 season and Middlesbrough decided not to extend his contract.

=== Jeonbuk Hyundai Motors ===
Lee signed a contract with Seongnam Ilhwa Chunma in 2008, but his difficult time was continued. He was transferred to Jeonbuk Hyundai Motors in the 2009 transfer window. In the 2009 K League, Lee became the top scorer by scoring 21 goals during 29 appearances, and Jeonbuk won their first-ever league trophy. He was named the Most Valuable Player after spending a successful season. In the 2011 K League, Lee recorded 16 goals and 15 assists during 29 appearances, leading Jeonbuk's second league title. He became the Most Valuable Player once again as well as the top assist provider. He also led Jeonbuk to the 2011 AFC Champions League Final after scoring nine goals until the semi-finals. Jeonbuk lost the final to Al Sadd after penalty shoot-out, but he was named the Most Valuable Player and the top scorer. On 3 March 2012, Lee became the K League's all-time leading scorer with 117 goals when he got two goals in the 2012 season opener against Seongnam Ilhwa Chunma.

In 2013, Lee was involved in a bizarre incident in a K League match against Seongnam FC. While attempting to return the ball to Seongnam's goalkeeper after an injury stoppage, he accidentally struck it past him from 40 yards to level the score at 1–1. Jeonbuk goalkeeper Choi Eun-sung then sportingly scored an own goal on purpose to restore Seongnam's lead.

Lee won his third and fourth MVP award after adding K League titles in 2014 and 2015. On 15 March 2016, Lee scored his 30th AFC Champions League goal against Becamex Binh Duong and became the AFC Champions League's all-time top scorer. On 26 November 2016, Lee and Jeonbuk won the 2016 AFC Champions League after defeating Al Ain in the final.

In the 2016 K League 1, Jeonbuk was deducted nine points for bribing two referees, and Korean fans protested that the punishment was too light. However, Lee ignored the corruption of his club, and didn't accept the result after losing the league title.

On 2 June 2019, he scored his 200th career goal at Jeonbuk Hyundai Motors in a match against Sangju Sangmu. On 9 May 2020, Lee scored the only goal in a 1–0 win over Suwon Samsung Bluewings, which was notable for being the first league match in the world during the COVID-19 pandemic.

On 1 November 2020, Lee played virtually last game of his 23-year playing career, and got his retirement ceremony immediately after the game. This game, finished as a 2–0 victory over Daegu FC, was the last round of the 2020 K League 1, and Jeonbuk sealed their fourth successive title. On 8 November 2020, he played his last match as a substitute for eight minutes in the 2020 Korean FA Cup final, and got his last trophy.

== International career ==
In the 1998 FIFA World Cup, Lee was a member of the South Korea national team, playing a match against the Netherlands as a substitute. After the World Cup, he led South Korea to the AFC Youth Championship title, and became joint-top goalscorer at the tournament and the player of the match in the final.

Lee also took part in the 2000 AFC Asian Cup. He scored a hat-trick against Indonesia, bringing South Korea's only victory in the group stage. He scored a golden goal in extra time of the quarter-final match against Iran. He also scored a goal in the semi-finals against Saudi Arabia, but South Korea lost this time. He became a top goalscorer with six goals after scoring the winning goal in the third place match against China.

In 2002, Lee was not chosen by Guus Hiddink to represent South Korea in 2002 FIFA World Cup. Fans called him "Lazy Genius", because they felt that he did not fully use his potential. This is also because Hiddink emphasized strong stamina, great power, and agile speed, which are the categories that Lee struggles in, except power. He later admitted that he spent his days drinking and did not watch a single game that took place during the 2002 World Cup.

Lee was coach Dick Advocaat's first-choice selection at forward for Korea ahead of the 2006 FIFA World Cup, but a knee injury suffered in a K League match forced him to miss the tournament. On 1 November 2007, Lee was banned from the national team for twelve months after it was revealed that he, along with team captain Lee Woon-jae, teammates Kim Sang-sik and Woo Sung-yong, went on a late night drinking spree with several female employees during the 2007 AFC Asian Cup, in which Korea received third place. Unlike the other members who were involved in this incident, because Lee played for Middlesbrough in England, the KFA could not ban him from his club team matches.

Lee was selected as a reserve striker of the national team for the 2010 FIFA World Cup. He came on as a substitute in the round of 16 against Uruguay, and got a crucial chance made by Park Ji-sung. However, his shot lacked the power to cross the goal line, and South Korea lost the game after his mistake. He was denounced by South Korean fans, and was worried that his family would get hurt due to the criticisms about him.

Lee played in qualifiers for 2014 and 2018 FIFA World Cup but was not listed on the final teams for the tournaments.

== Personal life ==
Lee married Lee Soo-jin, a runner up of Miss Korea Hawaii 1997, in December 2005. The couple have five children: twin daughters Lee Jae-si and Lee Jae-ah (born 14 August 2007), twin daughters Lee Seol-ah and Lee Soo-ah (born 18 July 2013), and son Lee Si-an, nicknamed Daebak (born 14 November 2014).

Lee, along with his five children, has appeared on the Sunday variety show The Return of Superman (aired on KBS World TV) from 2015 to 2019. The Return of Superman shows famous Korean fathers taking care of their children for 48 hours without their wife. Lee is the first on the show to have five children to take care of.

On 23 December 2022, Lee signed with Thinking Entertainment.

== Career statistics ==
=== Club ===
Appearances and goals by club, season and competition
| Club | Season | League | | | National cup | | League cup | | Continental | | Other | | Total | |
| Club | Season | Division | Apps | Goals | Apps | Goals | Apps | Goals | Apps | Goals | Apps | Goals | Apps | Goals |
|---|---|---|---|---|---|---|---|---|---|---|---|---|---|---|
| Pohang Steelers | 1998 | K League | 15 | 7 | 0 | 0 | 9 | 4 | ? | ? | — | | 24 | 11 |
| Pohang Steelers | 1999 | K League | 15 | 7 | 0 | 0 | 4 | 1 | ? | ? | — | | 19 | 8 |
| Pohang Steelers | 2000 | K League | 7 | 4 | 0 | 0 | 1 | 0 | — | | — | | 8 | 4 |
| Pohang Steelers | 2001 | K League | 17 | 3 | 2 | 1 | — | | — | | — | | 19 | 4 |
| Pohang Steelers | 2002 | K League | 21 | 7 | 4 | 3 | 0 | 0 | — | | — | | 25 | 10 |
| Pohang Steelers | 2005 | K League | 17 | 3 | 3 | 0 | 7 | 4 | — | | — | | 27 | 7 |
| Pohang Steelers | 2006 | K League | 9 | 7 | 0 | 0 | 0 | 0 | ? | ? | 1 (Note: Appearances in K League Championship) | 0 | 10 | 7 |
| Pohang Steelers | Total | | 101 | 38 | 9 | 4 | 21 | 9 | — | | 1 | 0 | 132 | 51 |
| Werder Bremen (loan) | 2000–01 | Bundesliga | 7 | 0 | — | | — | | — | | — | | 7 | 0 |
| Gwangju Sangmu (draft) | 2003 | K League | 27 | 11 | 0 | 0 | 0 | 0 | — | | — | | 27 | 11 |
| Gwangju Sangmu (draft) | 2004 | K League | 19 | 1 | 2 | 0 | 4 | 3 | — | | — | | 25 | 4 |
| Gwangju Sangmu (draft) | 2005 | K League | — | | — | | 1 | 0 | — | | — | | 1 | 0 |
| Gwangju Sangmu (draft) | Total | | 46 | 12 | 2 | 0 | 5 | 3 | — | | — | | 53 | 15 |
| Middlesbrough | 2006–07 | Premier League | 9 | 0 | 2 | 0 | 0 | 0 | — | | — | | 11 | 0 |
| Middlesbrough | 2007–08 | Premier League | 14 | 0 | 2 | 1 | 2 | 1 | — | | — | | 18 | 2 |
| Middlesbrough | Total | | 23 | 0 | 4 | 1 | 2 | 1 | — | | — | | 29 | 2 |
| Seongnam Ilhwa Chunma | 2008 | K League | 10 | 2 | 0 | 0 | 3 | 0 | — | | — | | 13 | 2 |
| Jeonbuk Hyundai Motors | 2009 | K League | 27 | 20 | 4 | 4 | 3 | 1 | — | | 2 | 1 | 36 | 26 |
| Jeonbuk Hyundai Motors | 2010 | K League | 25 | 12 | 2 | 0 | 2 | 1 | 8 | 4 | 3 | 0 | 40 | 17 |
| Jeonbuk Hyundai Motors | 2011 | K League | 27 | 16 | 1 | 0 | 0 | 0 | 8 | 9 | 2 | 0 | 38 | 25 |
| Jeonbuk Hyundai Motors | 2012 | K League | 40 | 26 | 2 | 2 | — | | 6 | 4 | — | | 48 | 32 |
| Jeonbuk Hyundai Motors | 2013 | K League 1 | 30 | 13 | 2 | 2 | — | | 8 | 3 | — | | 40 | 18 |
| Jeonbuk Hyundai Motors | 2014 | K League 1 | 31 | 13 | 2 | 0 | — | | 7 | 3 | — | | 40 | 16 |
| Jeonbuk Hyundai Motors | 2015 | K League 1 | 33 | 13 | 1 | 1 | — | | 7 | 4 | — | | 41 | 18 |
| Jeonbuk Hyundai Motors | 2016 | K League 1 | 27 | 12 | 0 | 0 | — | | 13 | 5 | 1 (Note: Appearance in FIFA Club World Cup) | 0 | 41 | 17 |
| Jeonbuk Hyundai Motors | 2017 | K League 1 | 30 | 10 | 1 | 0 | — | | — | | — | | 31 | 10 |
| Jeonbuk Hyundai Motors | 2018 | K League 1 | 35 | 13 | 2 | 0 | — | | 8 | 4 | — | | 45 | 17 |
| Jeonbuk Hyundai Motors | 2019 | K League 1 | 33 | 9 | 0 | 0 | — | | 8 | 1 | — | | 41 | 10 |
| Jeonbuk Hyundai Motors | 2020 | K League 1 | 11 | 4 | 1 | 0 | — | | 1 | 0 | — | | 13 | 4 |
| Jeonbuk Hyundai Motors | Total | | 349 | 161 | 18 | 9 | 5 | 2 | 74 | 37 | 8 | 1 | 454 | 210 |
| Career total | | | 536 | 213 | 33 | 14 | 36 | 15 | 74 | 37 | 9 | 1 | 688 | 280 |

=== International ===
Appearances and goals by national team and year
| National team | Year | Apps | Goals |
|---|---|---|---|
| South Korea | 1998 | 8 | 0 |
| South Korea | 2000 | 10 | 8 |
| South Korea | 2001 | 6 | 1 |
| South Korea | 2002 | 4 | 0 |
| South Korea | 2003 | 1 | 0 |
| South Korea | 2004 | 10 | 8 |
| South Korea | 2005 | 15 | 4 |
| South Korea | 2006 | 9 | 1 |
| South Korea | 2007 | 7 | 0 |
| South Korea | 2009 | 4 | 0 |
| South Korea | 2010 | 10 | 3 |
| South Korea | 2011 | 2 | 0 |
| South Korea | 2012 | 8 | 5 |
| South Korea | 2013 | 5 | 0 |
| South Korea | 2014 | 4 | 3 |
| South Korea | 2017 | 2 | 0 |
| Career total | | 105 | 33 |

Scores and results list South Korea's goal tally first, score column indicates score after each Lee goal.

List of international goals scored by Lee Dong-gook
| No. | Date | Venue | Opponent | Score | Result | Competition |
|---|---|---|---|---|---|---|
| 1 | 17 February 2000 | Los Angeles, United States | Costa Rica | 1–0 | 2–2 | 2000 CONCACAF Gold Cup |
| 2 | 7 October 2000 | Dubai, United Arab Emirates | Australia | 4–2 | 4–2 | 2000 LG Cup |
| 3 | 19 October 2000 | Tripoli, Lebanon | Indonesia | 1–0 | 3–0 | 2000 AFC Asian Cup |
| 4 | 19 October 2000 | Tripoli, Lebanon | Indonesia | 2–0 | 3–0 | 2000 AFC Asian Cup |
| 5 | 19 October 2000 | Tripoli, Lebanon | Indonesia | 3–0 | 3–0 | 2000 AFC Asian Cup |
| 6 | 23 October 2000 | Tripoli, Lebanon | Iran | 2–1 | 2–1 (a.e.t.) | 2000 AFC Asian Cup |
| 7 | 26 October 2000 | Beirut, Lebanon | Saudi Arabia | 1–2 | 1–2 | 2000 AFC Asian Cup |
| 8 | 29 October 2000 | Beirut, Lebanon | China | 1–0 | 1–0 | 2000 AFC Asian Cup |
| 9 | 16 September 2001 | Busan, South Korea | Nigeria | 2–1 | 2–1 | Friendly |
| 10 | 10 July 2004 | Gwangju, South Korea | Bahrain | 1–0 | 2–0 | Friendly |
| 11 | 23 July 2004 | Jinan, China | United Arab Emirates | 1–0 | 2–0 | 2004 AFC Asian Cup |
| 12 | 27 July 2004 | Jinan, China | Kuwait | 1–0 | 4–0 | 2004 AFC Asian Cup |
| 13 | 27 July 2004 | Jinan, China | Kuwait | 2–0 | 4–0 | 2004 AFC Asian Cup |
| 14 | 31 July 2004 | Jinan, China | Iran | 2–2 | 3–4 | 2004 AFC Asian Cup |
| 15 | 8 September 2004 | Ho Chi Minh City, Vietnam | Vietnam | 1–1 | 2–1 | 2006 FIFA World Cup qualification |
| 16 | 17 November 2004 | Seoul, South Korea | Maldives | 2–0 | 2–0 | 2006 FIFA World Cup qualification |
| 17 | 19 December 2004 | Busan, South Korea | Germany | 2–1 | 3–1 | Friendly |
| 18 | 9 February 2005 | Seoul, South Korea | Kuwait | 1–0 | 2–0 | 2006 FIFA World Cup qualification |
| 19 | 30 March 2005 | Seoul, South Korea | Uzbekistan | 2–0 | 2–1 | 2006 FIFA World Cup qualification |
| 20 | 8 June 2005 | Kuwait City, Kuwait | Kuwait | 2–0 | 4–0 | 2006 FIFA World Cup qualification |
| 21 | 16 November 2005 | Seoul, South Korea | Serbia and Montenegro | 2–0 | 2–0 | Friendly |
| 22 | 15 February 2006 | Los Angeles, United States | Mexico | 1–0 | 1–0 | Friendly |
| 23 | 7 February 2010 | Tokyo, Japan | Hong Kong | 3–0 | 5–0 | 2010 EAFF Championship |
| 24 | 14 February 2010 | Tokyo, Japan | Japan | 1–1 | 3–1 | 2010 EAFF Championship |
| 25 | 3 March 2010 | London, Great Britain | Ivory Coast | 1–0 | 2–0 | Friendly |
| 26 | 25 February 2012 | Jeonju, South Korea | Uzbekistan | 1–0 | 4–2 | Friendly |
| 27 | 25 February 2012 | Jeonju, South Korea | Uzbekistan | 2–0 | 4–2 | Friendly |
| 28 | 29 February 2012 | Seoul, South Korea | Kuwait | 1–0 | 2–0 | 2014 FIFA World Cup qualification |
| 29 | 11 September 2012 | Tashkent, Uzbekistan | Uzbekistan | 2–1 | 2–2 | 2014 FIFA World Cup qualification |
| 30 | 14 November 2012 | Hwaseong, South Korea | Australia | 1–0 | 1–2 | Friendly |
| 31 | 5 September 2014 | Bucheon, South Korea | Venezuela | 2–1 | 3–1 | Friendly |
| 32 | 5 September 2014 | Bucheon, South Korea | Venezuela | 3–1 | 3–1 | Friendly |
| 33 | 14 October 2014 | Seoul, South Korea | Costa Rica | 1–1 | 1–3 | Friendly |

== Filmography ==
=== Television ===
| Year | Title | Role | Note(s) | Ref. |
|---|---|---|---|---|
| 2012 | 2 Days & 1 Night | Himself | Episode 224–226 | |
| 2012 | Healing Camp, Aren't You Happy | Himself | Episode 27 | |
| 2015–2019 | The Return of Superman | Himself | Episode 89–298 | |
| 2019 | Knowing Bros | Himself | Episode 210 | |
| 2020 | Fly Shoot Dori 7th League | Himself | Episode 1–2, 4–6 | |
| 2020 | The Gentlemen's League | Himself | Episode 46, 76 | |
| 2020 | The Return of Superman | Himself | Episode 363 | |
| 2020 | Master in the House | Himself | Episode 147–148 | |
| 2021 | The Fishermen and the City Season 2 | Himself | Episode 55–56 | |
| 2021 | My Fantasy House | Himself | Episode 3–4 | |
| 2021 | Law of the Jungle – Stove League | Himself | Episode 434–437 | |
| 2021 | Stars' Top Recipe at Fun-Staurant | Himself | Episode 80–81 | |
| 2021 | Comfortable Café | Himself (host) | | |
| 2021 | Let's Play Basketball | Himself | | |
| 2021 | Law of the Jungle – Masters of Survival | Himself | Episode 443–445 | |
| 2021 | King of Golf | Himself | | |
| 2021 | Comfortable Café 2 | Himself (host) | | |
| 2021–2023 | The Gentlemen's League Season 2 | Himself | | |
| 2022 | Can't Cheat Blood | Himself (host) | | |
| 2022 | Legend Festival | Himself (host) | | |
| 2022 | Hole-in-one between Legends | Himself | | |
| 2022 | Now, Follow Me | Himself | | |
| 2025 | The Gentlemen's League Season 4 | Himself | | |

== Honours ==
=== Player ===
Pohang Steelers

- Asian Club Championship: 1997–98
- Korean FA Cup runner-up: 2001, 2002

Jeonbuk Hyundai Motors

- K League 1: 2009, 2011, 2014, 2015, 2017, 2018, 2019, 2020, 2021
- Korean FA Cup: 2020
- AFC Champions League: 2016

South Korea U20

- AFC Youth Championship: 1998

South Korea U23

- Asian Games bronze medal: 2002

South Korea

- AFC Asian Cup third place: 2000, 2007
- EAFF Championship runner-up: 2010

Individual

- AFC Youth Championship top goalscorer: 1998
- K League All-Star Game Most Valuable Player: 1998, 2001, 2003, 2012
- K League All-Star: 1998, 1999, 2000, 2001, 2002, 2003, 2004, 2005, 2009, 2010, 2012, 2013, 2014, 2015, 2019
- K League Rookie of the Year: 1998
- AFC Asian Cup top goalscorer: 2000
- AFC Asian Cup Team of the Tournament: 2000
- AFC Asian All-Star: 2000
- Korean FA Goal of the Year: 2004
- K League 1 top goalscorer: 2009
- K League 1 Most Valuable Player: 2009, 2011, 2014, 2015
- K League FANtastic Player: 2009, 2011, 2014, 2015
- K League 1 Best XI: 2009, 2011, 2012, 2014, 2015
- EAFF Championship top goalscorer: 2010
- K League 1 top assist provider: 2011
- AFC Champions League top goalscorer: 2011
- AFC Champions League Most Valuable Player: 2011
- K League Hall of Fame: 2023

Records

- K League all-time top goalscorer: 228 goals

=== Television personality ===
List of awards and nominations received by TV personality Lee Dong-gook
| Award ceremony | Year | Category | Nominated work | Result | Ref. |
|---|---|---|---|---|---|
| KBS Entertainment Awards | 2015 | Best Entertainer Award | The Return of Superman | Won | |
| KBS Entertainment Awards | 2015 | Male MC Newcomer Award | The Return of Superman | Nominated | |
| KBS Entertainment Awards | 2016 | Top Excellence Award in a Variety Show | The Return of Superman | Won | |
| KBS Entertainment Awards | 2018 | Grand Prize | The Return of Superman | Nominated | |

== See also ==
- List of men's footballers with 100 or more international caps
