= Kang Ju-ho =

South Korean footballer (born 1989)

Kang Ju-Ho
Personal information
- Full name: Kang Ju-Ho
- Date of birth: 26 March 1989 (age 37)
- Place of birth: South Korea
- Height: 1.76 m (5 ft 9 1/2 in)
- Position: Midfielder

Team information
- Current team: Chungju Hummel
- Number: 14

Youth career
- Kyunghee University

Senior career*
Years	Team	Apps	(Gls)
2012	Jeonbuk Hyundai Motors	2	(0)
2013	Chungju Hummel	31	(3)
2014	Gyeongju KHNP	4	(0)
2014	Mokpo	11	(3)
2015	Hwaseong		
2016	Chuncheon		
- * Club domestic league appearances and goals as of 19 December 2013

Kang Ju-Ho (Korean: 강주호; born 26 March 1989) is a South Korean footballer who played as a midfielder for Chungju Hummel in the K League Challenge.
