= Seo Sang-min =

South Korean footballer (born 1986)

Seo Sang-min 서상민
Personal information
- Full name: Seo Sang-min
- Date of birth: July 25, 1986 (age 40)
- Place of birth: Seoul, South Korea
- Height: 1.75 m (5 ft 9 in)
- Position: Midfielder

Youth career
- 2005–2007: Yonsei University

Senior career*
Years	Team	Apps	(Gls)
2008–2011	Gyeongnam FC	83	(11)
2012–2016	Jeonbuk Hyundai	58	(8)
2014–2015	→ Sangju Sangmu (army)	32	(2)
2017	Suwon FC	17	(1)
2018–2019	Hoi King	7	(1)
2019	Kitchee	1	(0)
- * Club domestic league appearances and goals as of 29 March 2019

Seo Sang-min (Hanja: 徐相民; born July 25, 1986) is a South Korean footballer who plays as a midfielder.

== Club career ==
His first league match was the opening match of the 2008 K League for Gyeongnam against Daegu.

After a year away from football, Seo moved to Hong Kong club Hoi King on 28 September 2018. On 16 January 2019, he moved to another Hong Kong Premier League club Kitchee.
