= Choi Eun-sung =

South Korean footballer (born 1971)

Choi Eun-sung 최은성
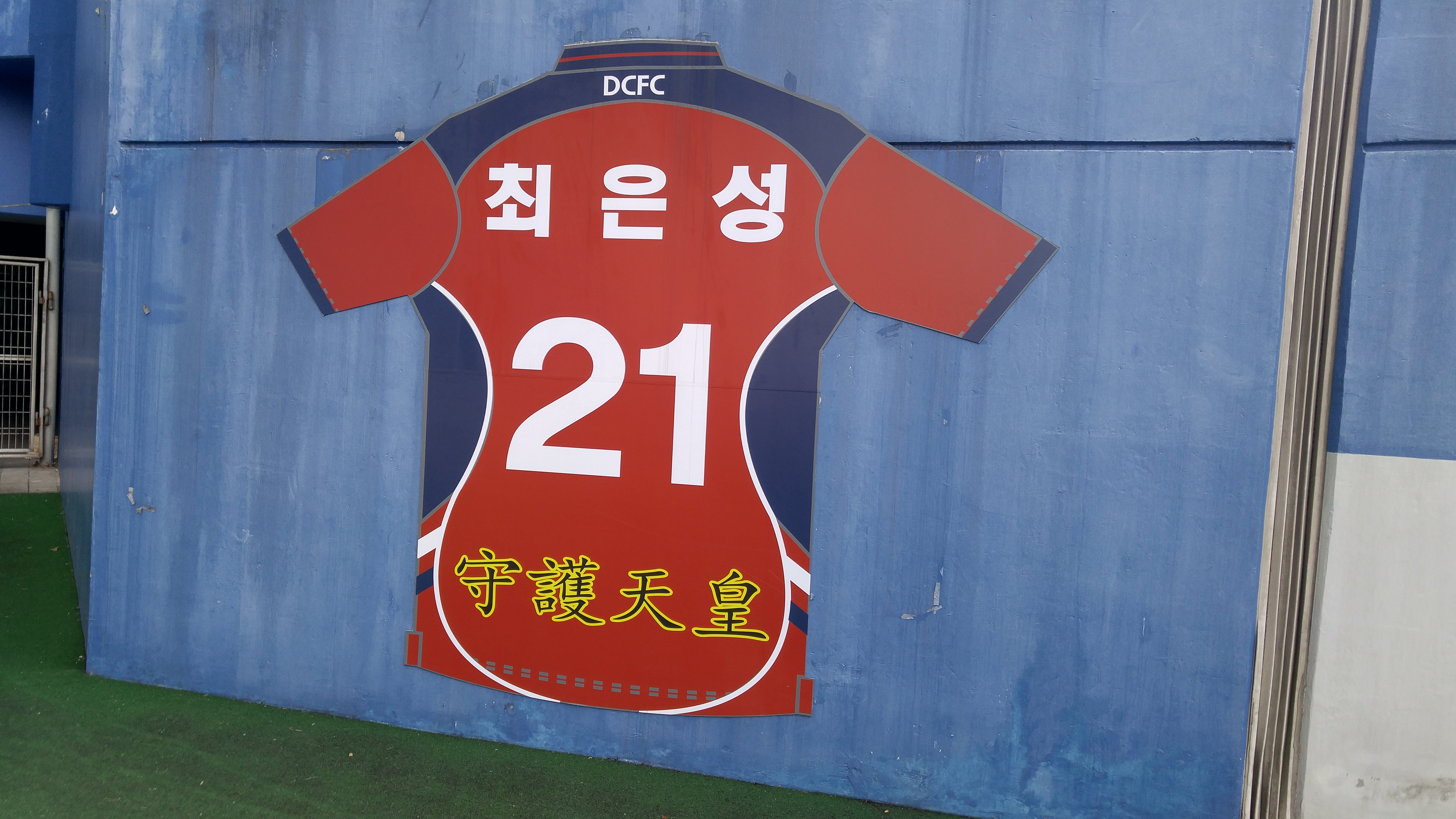
- Choi Eun Sung Memorial Attachment

Personal information
- Full name: Choi Eun-sung
- Date of birth: 5 April 1971 (age 55)
- Place of birth: Hanam, Gyeonggi, South Korea
- Height: 1.84 m (6 ft 1/2 in)
- Position: Goalkeeper

Youth career
- 1991–1996: University of Incheon

Senior career*
Years	Team	Apps	(Gls)
1995	Kookmin Bank		
1995–1996	Sangmu FC (military service)		
1997–2011	Daejeon Citizen	352	(1)
2012–2014	Jeonbuk Hyundai Motors	68	(0)
Total		420	(0)

International career
2001–2002	South Korea	1	(0)
- * Club domestic league appearances and goals

- Choi Eun-sung
- Hangul: 최은성
- Hanja: 崔殷誠
- RR: Choe Eunseong
- MR: Ch'oe Ŭnsŏng

Choi Eun-sung (born 5 April 1971) is a South Korean former professional footballer who last played for Jeonbuk Hyundai Motors. He spent 15 seasons as the goalkeeper with Daejeon Citizen.

He played for the South Korea national football team and was a participant at the 2002 FIFA World Cup.

He was the first goalkeeper to score in the AFC Champions League, in a match against Macau club Monte Carlo on 9 October 2002. Daejeon Citizen went on to win the match 5–1.

In February 2012, just before the 2012 league campaign, Choi requested to extend his contract with Daejeon for one more year, but the board rejected his proposal and he was forced to leave the club and become a free agent. On 23 March 2012, Choi joined Jeonbuk Hyundai Motors on a one-year deal. While at Jeonbuk, Choi sportingly scored an own goal on purpose during a match against Seongnam, after team-mate Lee Dong-gook accidentally scored while attempting to return the ball to Seongnam's goalkeeper; Seongnam won the match 2–1.

== Club career statistics ==
As of 23 March 2012

Club performance			League		Cup		League Cup		Continental		Total	
Season	Club	League	Apps	Goals	Apps	Goals	Apps	Goals	Apps	Goals	Apps	Goals
South Korea			League		KFA Cup		League Cup		Asia		Total	
1997	Daejeon Citizen	K League 1	18	0			17	0	—			
1998	Daejeon Citizen	K League 1	17	0			16	0	—			
1999	Daejeon Citizen	K League 1	23	0			9	0	—			
2000	Daejeon Citizen	K League 1	25	0			8	0	—			
2001	Daejeon Citizen	K League 1	25	0			8	0	—			
2002	Daejeon Citizen	K League 1	24	0			1	0	4	1		
2003	Daejeon Citizen	K League 1	37	0	3	0	—		3	0	43	0
2004	Daejeon Citizen	K League 1	22	0	4	0	10	0	—		36	0
2005	Daejeon Citizen	K League 1	22	0	0	0	11	0	—		33	0
2006	Daejeon Citizen	K League 1	26	0	1	0	13	0	—		40	0
2007	Daejeon Citizen	K League 1	24	0	1	0	8	0	—		33	0
2008	Daejeon Citizen	K League 1	25	0	1	0	6	0	—		32	0
2009	Daejeon Citizen	K League 1	24	0	4	0	4	0	—		32	0
2010	Daejeon Citizen	K League 1	12	0	0	0	1	0	—		13	0
2011	Daejeon Citizen	K League 1	28	0	1	0	0	0	—		29	0
2012	Jeonbuk Hyundai Motors	K League 1										
Career total			352	0			112	0	7	1		

== National team ==
- 2001 Confederations Cup
- 2002 FIFA World Cup

Sporting positions
Preceded by Kim Jung-Su	Daejeon Citizen captain 2003-2006	Succeeded by Kang Jung-Hoon
Preceded by Kim Gil-Sik	Daejeon Citizen captain 2009	Succeeded by Hwang Ji-Yoon
