= Kang Jung-hoon =

South Korean former footballer

Personal information
- Date of birth: January 10, 1976 (age 50)
- Place of birth: Haenam, South Korea
- Height: 5 ft 9 in (1.75 m)
- Position: Midfielder

Senior career*
Years	Team	Apps	(Gls)
1998–2007	Daejeon Citizen	182	(7)
2008	Gimhae City FC	13	(0)
- * Club domestic league appearances and goals as of 17 January 2007

- Kang Jung-hoon
- Hangul: 강정훈
- RR: Gang Jeonghun
- MR: Kang Chŏnghun

Kang Jung-hoon (born January 10, 1976) is a South Korean former footballer. He currently plays for Daejeon Citizen, a South Korean side.

He is one of two players who have played for Daejeon Citizen for over 10 years, starting his football life there in 1998.

His 200th club appearance was the opening match for the 2006 season.

Sporting positions
Preceded by Choi Eun-sung	Daejeon Citizen captain 2007	Succeeded by Ko Jong-soo
