= Kim Dong-chan =

South Korean footballer (born 1986)

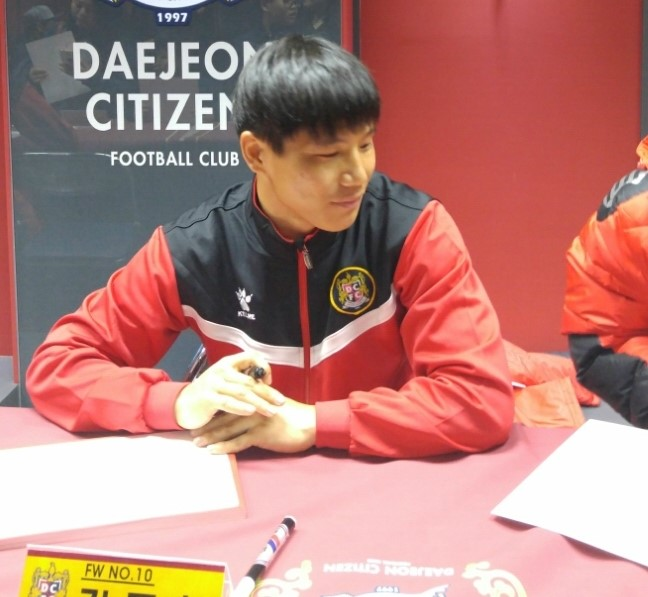
- Kim in 2016

Personal information
- Date of birth: 19 April 1986 (age 40)
- Place of birth: Gwacheon, Gyeonggi, South Korea
- Height: 1.68 m (5 ft 6 in)
- Position: Striker

College career
Years	Team	Apps	(Gls)
2005	Honam University		

Senior career*
Years	Team	Apps	(Gls)
2006–2010	Gyeongnam FC	69	(19)
2011–2015	Jeonbuk Hyundai Motors	62	(14)
2013–2014	→ Sangju Sangmu (draft)	44	(8)
2016	Daejeon Citizen	39	(20)
2017	BEC Tero Sasana	16	(1)
2017	Seongnam FC	16	(6)
2018–2019	Suwon FC	18	(1)
2020	Gimpo FC	18	(2)
Total		282	(71)
- * Club domestic league appearances and goals

- Kim Dong-chan
- Hangul: 김동찬
- Hanja: 金東燦
- RR: Gim Dongchan
- MR: Kim Tongch'an

Kim Dong-chan (Korean: 김동찬; 19 April 1986) is a former South Korean footballer who played as a striker. He scored the most goals at the 2016 K League Challenge, being named the league's Most Valuable Player.

== Honours ==
Gyeongnam FC

- Korean FA Cup runner-up: 2008

Jeonbuk Hyundai Motors

- K League 1: 2011, 2014, 2015
- AFC Champions League runner-up: 2011

Sangju Sangmu

- K League 2: 2013

Individual

- Korean FA Cup top goalscorer: 2008
- K League 2 Most Valuable Player: 2016
- K League 2 top goalscorer: 2016
- K League 2 Best XI: 2016
