= Kim Ji-woong (footballer) =

South Korean footballer (born 1989)

Kim Ji-Woong
Personal information
- Full name: Kim Ji-Woong
- Date of birth: January 14, 1989 (age 37)
- Place of birth: South Korea
- Height: 1.76 m (5 ft 9 1/2 in)
- Position: Midfielder

Youth career
- 2007–2009: Kyung Hee University

Senior career*
Years	Team	Apps	(Gls)
2010–2011	Jeonbuk Hyundai Motors	22	(3)
2012	Gyeongnam FC	2	(1)
2013	Busan IPark	2	(0)
2014	Pocheon FC		
2014–2015	Goyang Hi FC	4	(1)
- * Club domestic league appearances and goals as of 28 November 2014

Kim Ji-Woong (born January 14, 1989) is a South Korean football player.

== Early life ==
Kim attended Songjeong Elementary School, Moonwon Middle School, and Janghoon High School, and graduated from Kyung Hee University.

== Professional career ==
Kim began playing for Jeonbuk Hyundai Motors Football Club as a striker in 2010. With Jeonbuk, Kim played 29 games, scoring 4 goals and 2 assists. He transferred to Gyeongnam FC in 2012, playing 2 games and scoring 1 goal, and then transferred to Busan IPark in 2013. In 2014 Kim transferred to Goyang FC.

In October 2014, Kim was suspended for four games after tackling Daejeon Hana Citizen FC goalkeeper Park Joo-won.
