= Kim Jae-hoan =

South Korean footballer (born 1988)

Personal information
- Date of birth: 27 May 1988 (age 38)
- Place of birth: Jeonju, North Jeolla, South Korea
- Height: 1.84 m (6 ft 1/2 in)
- Position: Defender

Team information
- Current team: Jeonbuk Hyundai Motors
- Number: 44

Youth career
- 2004–2006: Hanyang Technical High School
- 2007–2010: Jeonju University

Senior career*
Years	Team	Apps	(Gls)
2011–	Jeonbuk Hyundai Motors	8	(0)
2012	→ Consadole Sapporo (loan)	9	(0)
2014	→ Suwon FC (loan)	4	(0)
- * Club domestic league appearances and goals as of 4 December 2015

- Kim Jae-hoan
- Hangul: 김재환
- Hanja: 金載桓
- RR: Gim Jaehwan
- MR: Kim Chaehwan

Kim Jae-hoan (Korean: 김재환; born 27 May 1988) is a South Korean footballer who plays as a defender for Jeonbuk Hyundai Motors.
