= Luiz Henrique (footballer, born 1981) =

Brazilian footballer

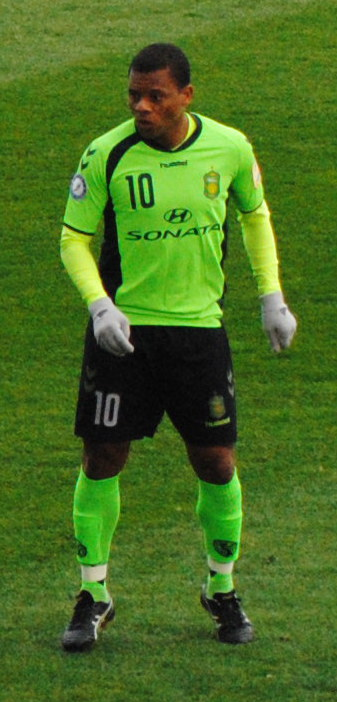
- Luiz Henrique in 2010

Personal information
- Full name: Luiz Henrique da Silva Alves
- Date of birth: 2 July 1981 (age 45)
- Place of birth: Rio de Janeiro, Brazil
- Height: 1.72 m (5 ft 8 in)
- Positions: Attacking midfielder; striker

Youth career
- 2000: Vasco da Gama

Senior career*
Years	Team	Apps	(Gls)
2000–2001	Vasco da Gama		
2002–2003	Baré		
2004–2005	Nacional-AM		
2006–2009	São Caetano		
2007–2008	→ Palmeiras (loan)		
2008	→ Suwon Bluewings (loan)	15	(4)
2008–2009	→ Jeonbuk Hyundai Motors (loan)		
2010–2012	Jeonbuk Hyundai Motors	63	(11)
2012–2013	Al-Shabab	23	(7)
2013–2015	Emirates Club	48	(14)
2015–2016	Jeonbuk Hyundai Motors	35	(8)
2016–2017	Gangwon FC	18	(7)
2017	Ajman Club		
- * Club domestic league appearances and goals

Luiz Henrique da Silva Alves or simply Luiz Henrique (born 2 July 1981 in Rio de Janeiro), is a Brazilian former professional footballer who played as a striker.

== Career ==
On 23 November 2008, Luiz scored the decisive winner in a K-League play-off match against Seongnam Ilhwa Chunma, helping Jeonbuk Hyundai Motors advance to the next stage of the play-off.

In 2009 K-League, He led Jeonbuk Hyundai Motors to 2009 K-League Champion and placed top assister at 2009 season.

On 23 December 2009, Jeonbuk completed to convert his loan move into a permanent deal. On 19 July 2016, he moved to Gangwon FC in K League Challenge.
