= Sim Woo-yeon =

South Korean footballer (born 1985)

Sim Woo-Yeon 심우연
Personal information
- Full name: Sim Woo-yeon
- Date of birth: 3 April 1985 (age 41)
- Place of birth: Seoul, South Korea
- Height: 1.97 m (6 ft 6 in)
- Positions: Centre-back; forward

Team information
- Current team: FC Seoul
- Number: 3

Youth career
- Konkuk University

Senior career*
Years	Team	Apps	(Gls)
2006–2009	FC Seoul	13	(1)
2010–2012	Jeonbuk Hyundai Motors	76	(4)
2013–2015	Seongnam FC	17	(0)
2016–	FC Seoul	12	(0)

International career
2005	South Korea U20	8	(1)
2006–2007	South Korea U23	4	(0)
2012	South Korea	1	(0)
- * Club domestic league appearances and goals as of 1 December 2017

Sim Woo-yeon (Korean: 심우연; Hanja: 沈禹姸; born 3 April 1985) is a South Korean football player who plays for FC Seoul. His preferred position is as a centre-back, however, he can also operate as a forward.

== Club career statistics ==
Club performance			League		Cup		League Cup		Continental		Total	
Season	Club	League	Apps	Goals	Apps	Goals	Apps	Goals	Apps	Goals	Apps	Goals
South Korea			League		KFA Cup		League Cup		Asia		Total	
2006	FC Seoul	K League 1	3	1	0	0	6	1	—		9	2
2007	FC Seoul	K League 1	8	0	2	0	7	2	—		17	2
2008	FC Seoul	K League 1	0	0	1	0	0	0	—		1	0
2009	FC Seoul	K League 1	2	0	0	0	0	0	0	0	2	0
2010	Jeonbuk Hyundai Motors	K League 1	24	2	2	1	5	0	7	3	38	6
2011	Jeonbuk Hyundai Motors	K League 1	21	2	0	0	0	0	10	0	31	2
2012	Jeonbuk Hyundai Motors	K League 1	31	0	2	0	—		1	0	34	0
Total	South Korea		89	5	7	1	18	3	18	3	132	12
Career total			89	5	7	1	18	3	18	3	132	12
