= Park Won-jae =

South Korean footballer (born 1984)

Personal information
- Full name: Park Won-jae
- Date of birth: 28 May 1984 (age 42)
- Place of birth: Pohang, Gyeongbuk, South Korea
- Height: 1.75 m (5 ft 9 in)
- Positions: Full back; midfielder

Team information
- Current team: Jeonbuk Hyundai Motors (assistant coach)

Youth career
- 2000–2002: Pohang Jecheol Technical High School

Senior career*
Years	Team	Apps	(Gls)
2003–2008	Pohang Steelers	126	(10)
2009	Omiya Ardija	21	(1)
2010–2020	Jeonbuk Hyundai Motors	134	(1)

International career^{‡}
2008–2013	South Korea	11	(0)

Managerial career
- 2020: Jeonbuk Hyundai Motors (playing coach)
- 2021–: Jeonbuk Hyundai Motors (assistant coach)
- * Club domestic league appearances and goals as of 1 February 2021 ‡ National team caps and goals as of 29 February 2014

- Park Won-jae
- Hangul: 박원재
- Hanja: 朴源載
- RR: Bak Wonjae
- MR: Pak Wŏnjae

Park Won-jae (Korean: 박원재; Hanja: 朴源載; born 28 May 1984 in Pohang) is a South Korean former footballer and an assistant coach, who last played as full back for Jeonbuk Hyundai Motors.

== Career ==
After graduating from Pohang Jecheol Technical High School, he joined Pohang Steelers in 2003. He made 126 appearances and scored 10 goals for K League 2003–2008 season in Pohang Steelers. He was moved to J1 League side Omiya Ardija in 2009. Park scored his first J1 League goal against Urawa Reds in May 2009. Park had appearances in 21 league games.

17 January 2010, He moved to Jeonbuk Hyundai Motors. 27 March 2013, He assisted the opening goal at 2014 FIFA World Cup Qualification, South Korea against Qatar

== National team statistics ==
Korea Republic national team
Year	Apps	Goals
2008	5	0
2009	0	0
2010	0	0
2011	2	0
2012	3	0
2013	1	0
Total	11	0
