= Lee Seung-hyun (footballer) =

South Korean footballer (born 1985)

Lee Seung-Hyun 이승현
Personal information
- Date of birth: July 25, 1985 (age 41)
- Place of birth: Daegu, South Korea
- Height: 1.76 m (5 ft 9 in)
- Position: Winger

Team information
- Current team: Suwon FC
- Number: 32

Youth career
- 2004–2005: Hanyang University

Senior career*
Years	Team	Apps	(Gls)
2006–2010	Busan I'Park	85	(11)
2011–2015	Jeonbuk Hyundai Motors	76	(13)
2013–2014	→ Sangju Sangmu (army)	43	(6)
2016–2020	Suwon FC	100	(13)

International career^{‡}
2005	South Korea U20	8	(0)
2006–2007	South Korea U23	8	(1)
2009–2011	South Korea	4	(0)
- * Club domestic league appearances and goals as of 29 November 2019 ‡ National team caps and goals as of 3 June 2011

Lee Seung-Hyun (Korean: 이승현; born July 25, 1985) is a South Korea footballer who plays as a winger for Suwon FC.
