= Kim Min-hak =

South Korean footballer (born 1988)

Personal information
- Date of birth: 4 October 1988 (age 38)
- Place of birth: South Korea
- Height: 1.72 m (5 ft 7 1/2 in)
- Position: Full back

Team information
- Current team: Chungbuk Cheongju FC
- Number: 15

Youth career
- Sunmoon University

Senior career*
Years	Team	Apps	(Gls)
2010–2011	Jeonbuk Hyundai	4	(1)
2012	Gyeongnam FC	0	(0)
2013–	Chungbuk Cheongju FC		
- * Club domestic league appearances and goals as of 18 December 2012

- Kim Min-hak
- Hangul: 김민학
- Hanja: 金民學
- RR: Gim Minhak
- MR: Kim Minhak

Kim Min-hak (Korean: 김민학; born 4 October 1988) is a South Korean footballer who plays as a full back for Gyeongnam FC in the K-League.
