= Lim You-hwan =

South Korean footballer (born 1983)

Lim You-Hwan 임유환
Personal information
- Full name: Lim You-Hwan
- Date of birth: December 2, 1983 (age 42)
- Place of birth: Yeosu, South Korea
- Height: 1.85 m (6 ft 1 in)
- Position: Defender

Team information
- Current team: Busan IPark
- Number: 17

Youth career
- Hanyang University

Senior career*
Years	Team	Apps	(Gls)
2003	Kyoto Purple Sanga	13	(0)
2004–2006	Jeonbuk Hyundai Motors	25	(2)
2007	Ulsan Hyundai Horang-i	8	(0)
2007–2013	Jeonbuk Hyundai Motors	108	(9)
2014–2015	Shanghai Shenxin	36	(1)
2015–2016	Albirex Niigata	5	(0)
2016	→ Tokyo Verdy (loan)	3	(0)
2017–	Busan IPark	6	(0)

International career^{‡}
2000–2003	South Korea U-20	16	(0)
2003–2004	South Korea U-23	7	(0)
2008	South Korea	1	(0)
- * Club domestic league appearances and goals as of 4 December 2017 ‡ National team caps and goals as of 15 November 2008

- Lim You-hwan
- Hangul: 임유환
- Hanja: 林裕煥
- RR: Im Yuhwan
- MR: Im Yuhwan

Lim You-Hwan (born December 2, 1983, in South Korea) is a South Korean football player who currently plays for Busan IPark. He was a participant at 2003 FIFA World Youth Championship in United Arab Emirates and 2004 Summer Olympics in Greece.

== Club statistics ==
As of 18 November 2017

Appearances and goals by club, season and competition
Club	Season	League			Cup		League Cup		Continental		Other		Total	
Club	Season	Division	Apps	Goals	Apps	Goals	Apps	Goals	Apps	Goals	Apps	Goals	Apps	Goals
Kyoto Purple Sanga	2003	J1 League	13	0	1	0	1	0	—		—		15	0
Jeonbuk Hyundai Motors	2004	K League 1	12	1	0	0	0	0			—		12	1
Jeonbuk Hyundai Motors	2005	K League 1	10	0	0	0	6	0	—		—		16	0
Jeonbuk Hyundai Motors	2006	K League 1	3	1	0	0	0	0	1	0	2	1	6	2
Jeonbuk Hyundai Motors	Total		25	2	0	0	6	0	1	0	2	1	34	3
Ulsan Horang-i	2007	K League 1	8	0	1	0	8	0	—		—		17	0
Jeonbuk Hyundai Motors	2007	K League 1	7	0	0	0	0	0	1	0	—		8	0
Jeonbuk Hyundai Motors	2008	K League 1	24	3	1	0	10	0	—		—		35	3
Jeonbuk Hyundai Motors	2009	K League 1	21	0	0	0	2	0	—		—		23	0
Jeonbuk Hyundai Motors	2010	K League 1	14	0	1	0	5	0	4	0	—		24	0
Jeonbuk Hyundai Motors	2011	K League 1	11	2	2	0	0	0	5	0	—		18	2
Jeonbuk Hyundai Motors	2012	K League 1	27	2	2	0	—		3	0	—		32	2
Jeonbuk Hyundai Motors	2013	K League 1	11	0	0	0	—		7	0	—		18	0
Jeonbuk Hyundai Motors	Total		115	7	6	0	17	0	20	0	—		158	7
Shanghai Shenxin	2014	Chinese Super League	23	1	1	0	—		—		—		24	1
Shanghai Shenxin	2015	Chinese Super League	12	0	0	0	—		—		—		12	0
Shanghai Shenxin	Total		35	1	1	0	—		—		—		36	1
Albirex Niigata	2015	J1 League	4	0	1	0	0	0	—		—		5	0
Albirex Niigata	2016	J1 League	1	0	0	0	0	0	—		—		1	0
Albirex Niigata	Total		5	0	1	0	0	0	—		—		6	0
Tokyo Verdy	2016	J2 League	3	0	1	0	—		—		—		4	0
Busan IPark	2017	K League 2	5	0	3	0	—		—		2	0	10	0
Total			209	10	14	0	32	0	21	0	4	1	280	11

== International career statistics ==
Korea Republic national team
Year	Apps	Goals
2008	1	0
Total	1	0
