= Seo Jung-jin (footballer) =

South Korean footballer (born 1989)

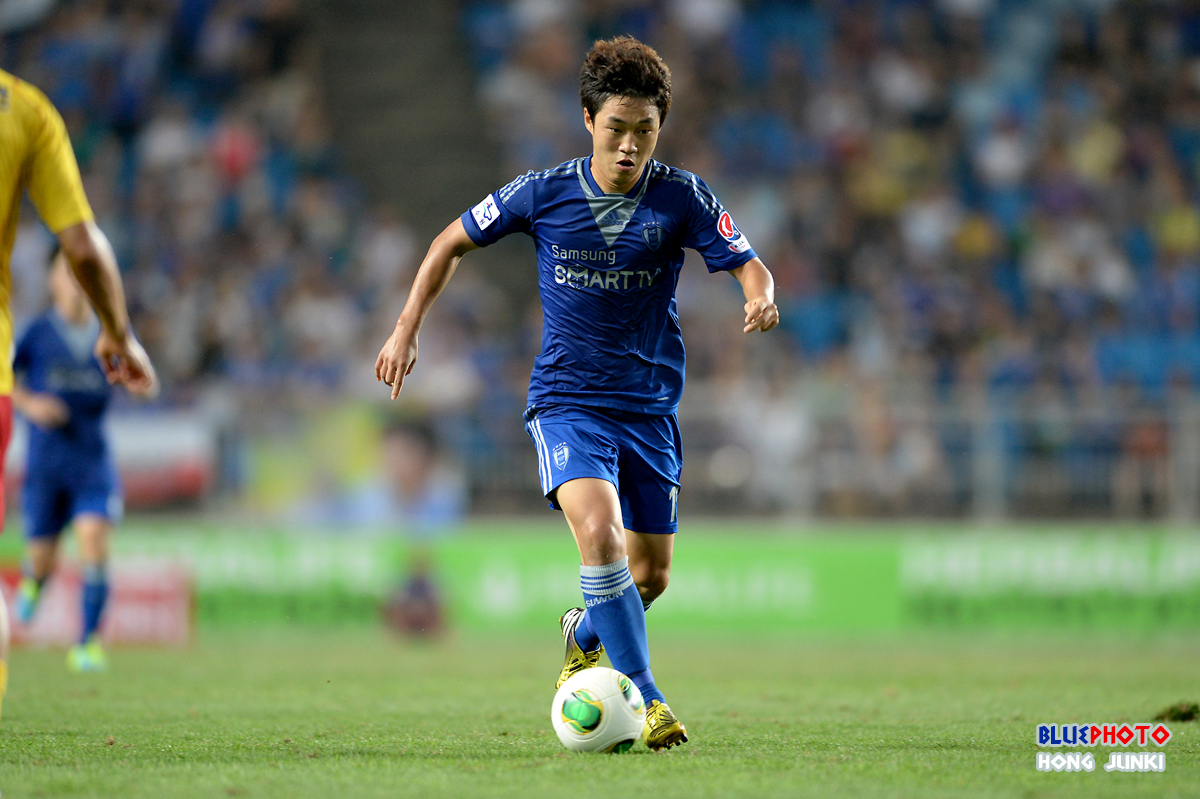

Personal information
- Full name: Seo Jung-jin
- Date of birth: 6 September 1989 (age 37)
- Place of birth: Daegu, South Korea
- Height: 1.75 m (5 ft 9 in)
- Position: Winger

Team information
- Current team: Hwaseong FC
- Number: 7

Senior career*
Years	Team	Apps	(Gls)
2008–2012	Jeonbuk Hyundai Motors	23	(2)
2012–2017	Suwon Samsung Bluewings	131	(12)
2016	Ulsan Hyundai	9	(0)
2016	→ Seoul E-Land (loan)	19	(0)
2018–2019	Gimpo Citizen Football Club (army)	0	(0)
2020	Gangneung City	17	(0)
2021–	Hwaseong FC	8	(1)

International career^{‡}
2008–2009	South Korea U20	14	(3)
2009–2012	South Korea U23	15	(2)
2011	South Korea	3	(0)
Medal record
Representing South Korea
Men's football
Asian Games
Bronze medal – third place	2010 Guangzhou	Team
- * Club domestic league appearances and goals as of 12:08, 4 January 2018 (UTC) ‡ National team caps and goals as of 15 November 2011

Seo Jung-jin (Korean: 서정진; born 6 September 1989) is a South Korean footballer who plays as a winger for Hwaseong FC.

== Club career statistics ==
As of 23 July 2016

Club performance			League		Cup		League Cup		Continental		Total	
Season	Club	League	Apps	Goals	Apps	Goals	Apps	Goals	Apps	Goals	Apps	Goals
South Korea			League		KFA Cup		League Cup		Asia		Total	
2008	Jeonbuk Hyundai Motors	K League	13	1	1	0	9	0	—		23	1
2009	Jeonbuk Hyundai Motors	K League	13	2	3	0	2	0	—		18	2
2010	Jeonbuk Hyundai Motors	K League	14	0	2	1	3	0	6	1	25	2
2011	Jeonbuk Hyundai Motors	K League	8	1	0	0	0	0	5	0	13	1
2012	Suwon Samsung Bluewings	K League	39	3	2	0	—		—		41	3
2013	Suwon Samsung Bluewings	K League	35	6	1	0	—		5	0	41	6
2014	Suwon Samsung Bluewings	K League	29	2			—		—		29	2
2015	Suwon Samsung Bluewings	K League	24	1			—		8	3	32	4
2016	Ulsan Hyundai	K League	9	0	0	0	—		—		9	0
2016	Seoul E-Land (loan)	K League	1	0	0	0	—		—		1	0
Total	South Korea		185	16	9	1	14	0	24	4	232	21
Career total			185	16	9	1	14	0	24	4	232	21
