= Hong Jeong-nam =

South Korean footballer (born 1988)

Personal information
- Full name: Hong Jeong-nam
- Date of birth: 21 May 1988 (age 38)
- Place of birth: Jeju, South Korea
- Height: 1.87 m (6 ft 2 in)
- Position: Goalkeeper

Senior career*
Years	Team	Apps	(Gls)
2007–2022	Jeonbuk Hyundai	38	(0)
2013–2014	→ Sangju Sangmu (army)	16	(0)
2022	Madura United	11	(0)
- * Club domestic league appearances and goals as of 25 March 2022

- Hong Jeong-nam
- Hangul: 홍정남
- Hanja: 洪正男
- RR: Hong Jeongnam
- MR: Hong Chŏngnam

Hong Jeong-nam (Korean: 홍정남; born 21 May 1988) is a South Korean professional footballer who plays as a goalkeeper. His younger brother Hong Jeong-ho, is also a footballer.

== Club career ==
=== Madura United ===
On 13 January 2022, He signed a one-year contract with Indonesian Liga 1 club Madura United. He made his league debut for Madura United on 28 January 2022 in a win 2–1 against PSIS Semarang.

== Honours ==
=== Club ===
Jeonbuk Hyundai Motors

- K League 1: 2009, 2011, 2014, 2015, 2017, 2018, 2019, 2020
- AFC Champions League: 2016

Sangju Sangmu

- K League 2: 2013
