= Jeonju World Cup Stadium =

Association football stadium in Jeonju, South Korea

- Jeonjuseong (Fort Jeonju)
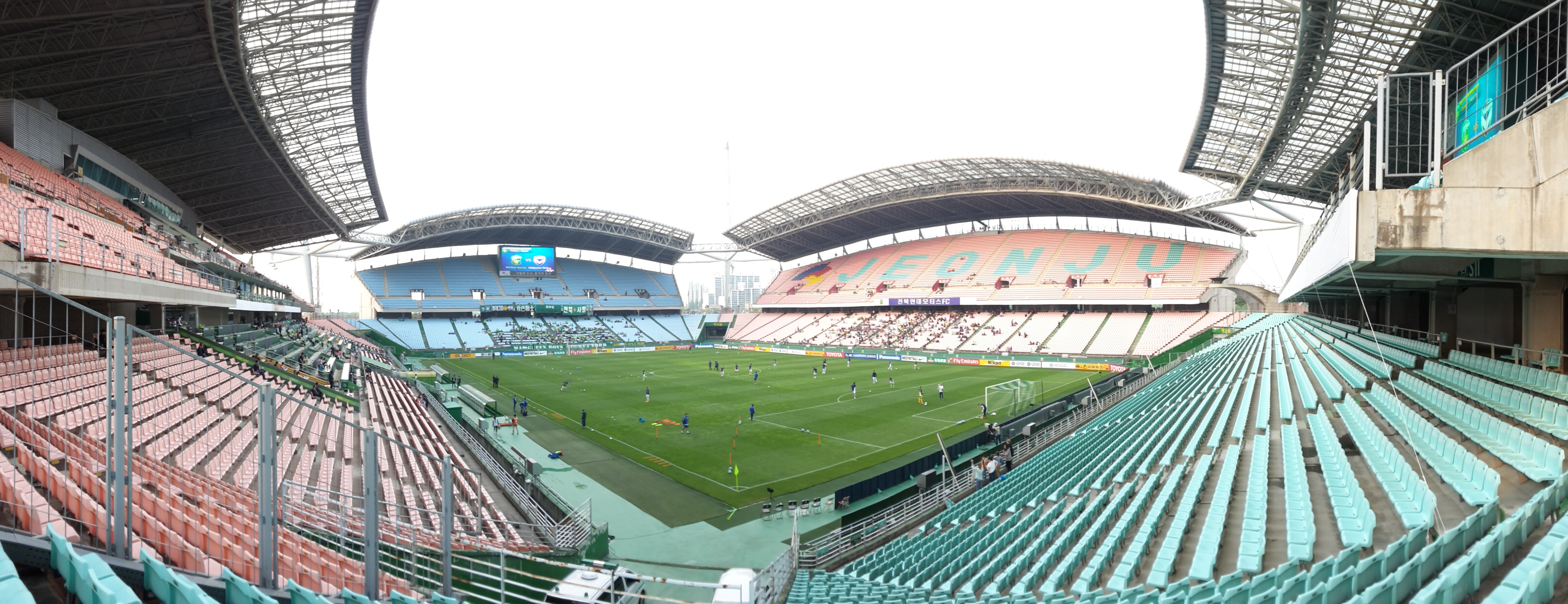
- Jeonju World Cup Stadium in 2016
- Interactive map of Jeonju World Cup Stadium
- Full name: Jeonju World Cup Stadium
- Location: 1190-13, Yeoui-dong, Deokjin-gu, Jeonju, South Korea
- Coordinates: 35.868111°N 127.064444°E
- Owner: Jeonju City Hall
- Operator: Jeonju City Facilities Management Corporation
- Capacity: 34,207
- Surface: Natural grass
- Field size: 105 by 68 metres (115 by 74 yards)

Construction
- Groundbreaking: February 2, 1999
- Opened: November 8, 2001
- Cost: 145 billion won

Tenants
- Jeonbuk Hyundai Motors (2002–present)

Jeonju World Cup Stadium is a football stadium in Jeonju, South Korea. It is the home of Jeonbuk Hyundai Motors. The stadium's capacity is 34,207.

== History ==
The Jeonju World Cup Stadium was constructed for the 2002 FIFA World Cup which was co-hosted by South Korea and Japan. The construction of the stadium started in February 1999. It was officially opened on November 8, 2001, by South Korean President Kim Dae-jung.

The venue hosted the final match of the 2011 AFC Champions League.

=== 2002 FIFA World Cup ===
Jeonju World Cup Stadium hosted three matches of the 2002 FIFA World Cup, hosting two group stage matches and one round of 16 match.

Date	Team 1	Res.	Team 2	Round	Attendance
June 7, 2002	Spain	3–1	Paraguay	Group B	24,000
June 10, 2002	Portugal	4–0	Poland	Group D	31,000
June 17, 2002	Mexico	0–2	United States	Round of 16	36,380

== Gallery ==
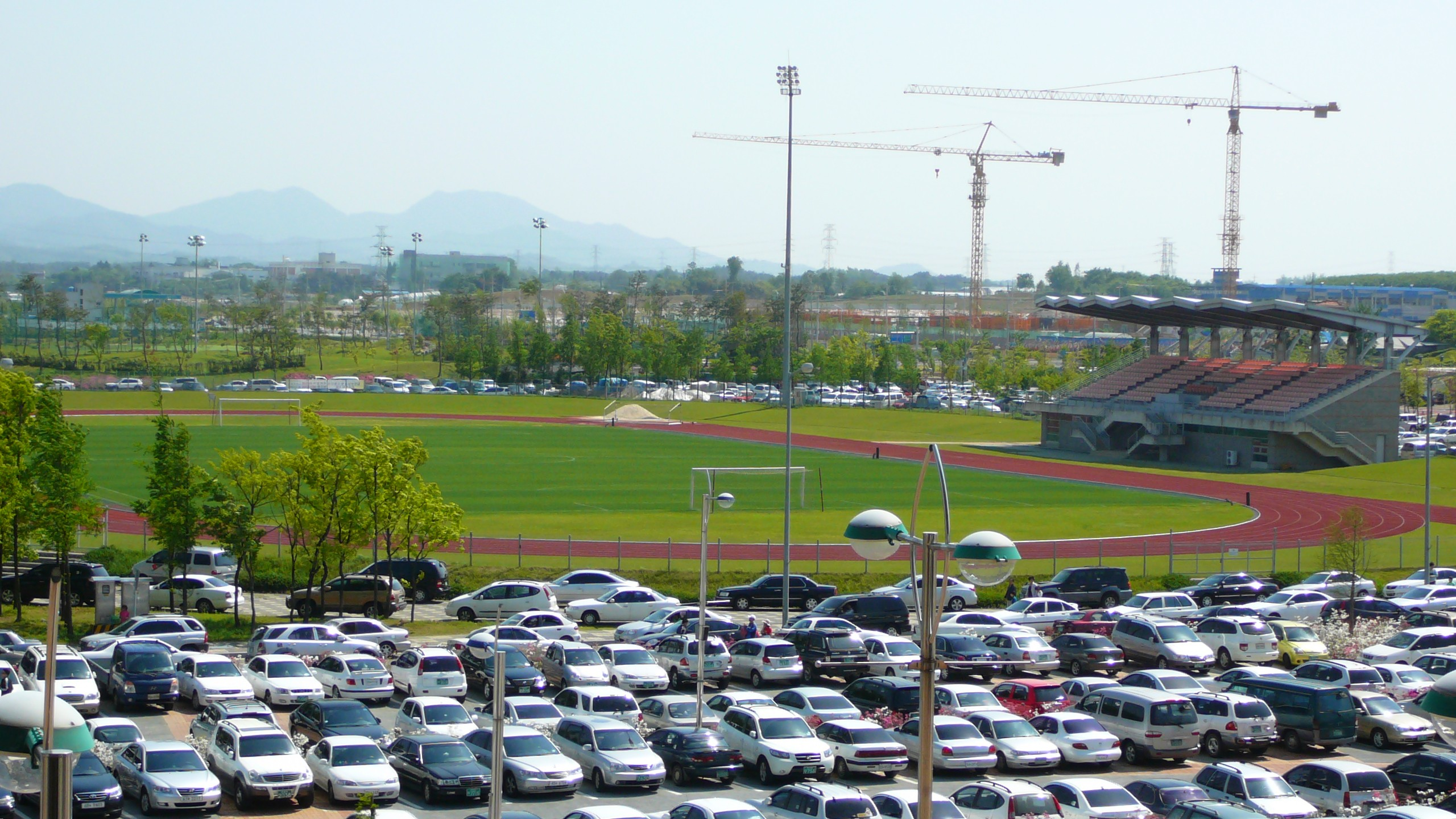
Supplementary stadium

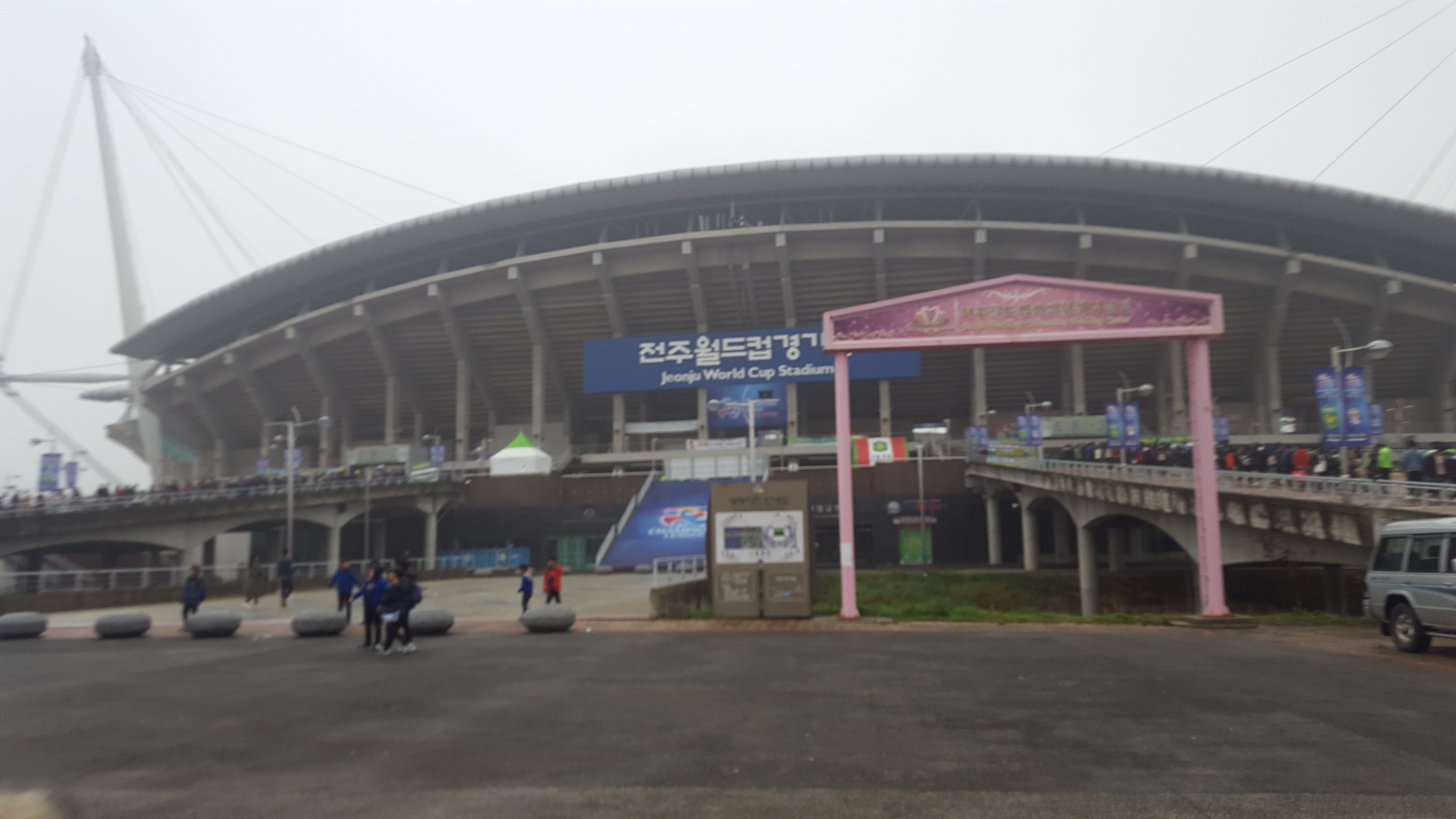
Exterior of the stadium in 2016

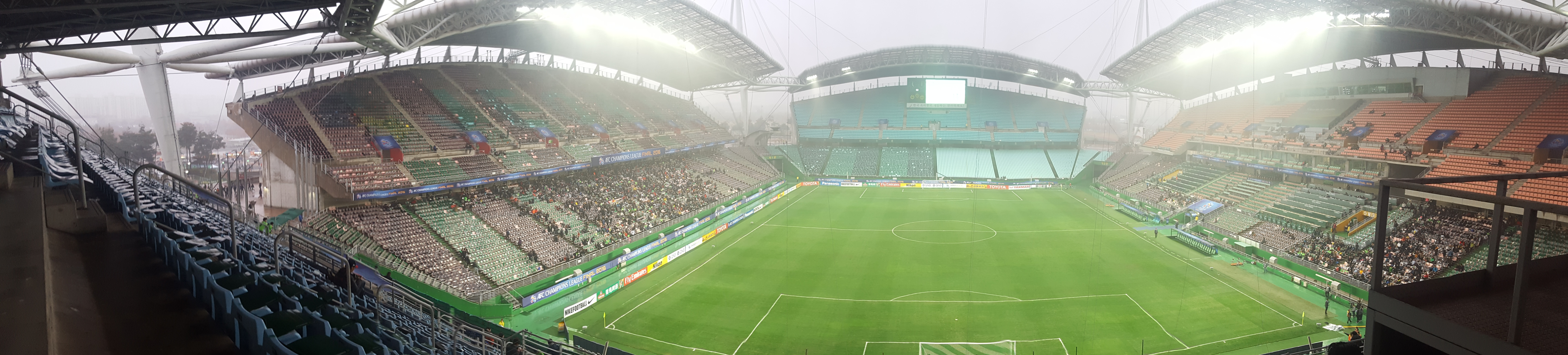
Interior of the stadium in 2016

Preceded by National Olympic Stadium	AFC Champions League; Final venue 2011	Succeeded by Ulsan Munsu Football Stadium
