= Jeon Kwang-hwan =

South Korean footballer (born 1982)

Jeon Kwang-Hwan
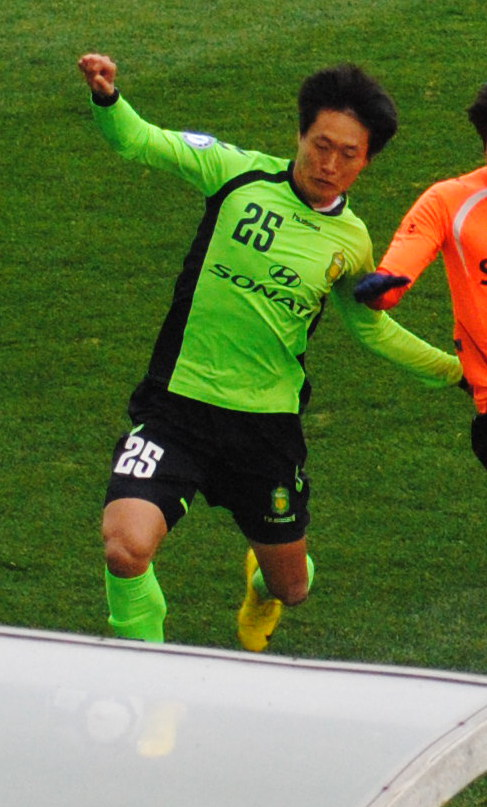

Personal information
- Date of birth: July 29, 1982 (age 44)
- Place of birth: South Korea
- Height: 1.73 m (5 ft 8 in)
- Position: Midfielder

Senior career*
Years	Team	Apps	(Gls)
2005–2013	Jeonbuk Hyundai Motors	91	(0)
2009–2010	→ Gwangju Sangmu (army)	51	(0)
2014–	Bucheon FC 1995	53	(0)
- * Club domestic league appearances and goals as of 15 December 2015

Jeon Kwang-Hwan (Korean: 전광환, born July 29, 1982) is a South Korean footballer. He last played for Bucheon FC 1995.
