= Jung Hoon =

South Korean footballer (born 1985)

Personal information
- Date of birth: August 31, 1985 (age 41)
- Place of birth: South Korea
- Height: 1.75 m (5 ft 9 in)
- Positions: Defensive midfielder; centre back

Youth career
- Dong-A University

Senior career*
Years	Team	Apps	(Gls)
2008–2015	Jeonbuk Hyundai Motors	114	(1)
2013–2014	→ Sangju Sangmu (army)	24	(0)
2016	Suphanburi	27	(0)
2017–2018	Suwon FC	31	(0)
2018–2019	PTT Rayong	31	(0)
- * Club domestic league appearances and goals as of 1 January 2018

- Korean name
- Hangul: 정훈
- RR: Jeong Hun
- MR: Chŏng Hun

Jung Hoon (born August 31, 1985) is a South Korean football player.

== Club career statistics ==
Club performance			League		Cup		League Cup		Continental		Total	
Season	Club	League	Apps	Goals	Apps	Goals	Apps	Goals	Apps	Goals	Apps	Goals
South Korea			League		KFA Cup		League Cup		Asia		Total	
2008	Jeonbuk Hyundai Motors	K-League	9	0	2	0	4	0	-		15	0
2009	Jeonbuk Hyundai Motors	K-League	21	1	1	0	3	1	-		25	2
Career total			30	1	3	0	7	1			40	2
