= Son Seung-joon =

South Korean footballer (born 1982)

Son Seung-Joon
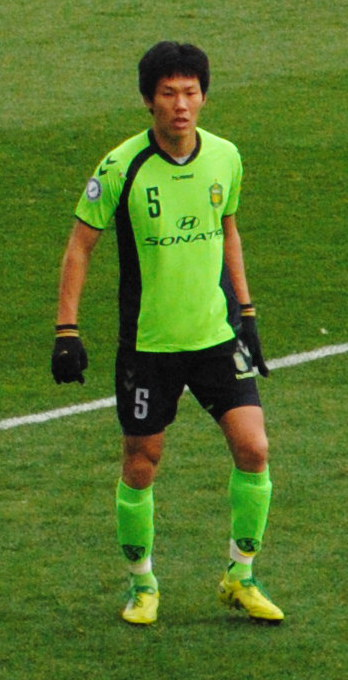

Personal information
- Full name: Son Seung-Joon (손승준)
- Date of birth: May 16, 1982 (age 44)
- Place of birth: South Korea
- Height: 1.87 m (6 ft 2 in)
- Positions: Defensive midfielder; central defender

Senior career*
Years	Team	Apps	(Gls)
2001–2007	Suwon Samsung Bluewings	50	(0)
2005–2006	→ Gwangju Sangmu (army)	19	(1)
2008–2012	Jeonbuk Hyundai Motors	40	(3)
2012	Henan Jianye	15	(0)

International career
2003	South Korea U-23	3	(1)
- * Club domestic league appearances and goals

Son Seung-Joon (born May 16, 1982) is a South Korean football player who currently plays for Henan Jianye F.C. (formerly Suwon Samsung Bluewings, Gwangju Sangmu and Jeonbuk Hyundai Motors).

== Biography ==
Son is a defender who can play as defensive midfielder, central defender and even wingback. His nickname in his youth was "Mr. Fighter" due to his physical fighting and strength. He was one of the members called "The children of Kim Ho", the head coach of U-23 Korea national team of Athene Olympic Team.

=== Career ===
In 2001, he entered Suwon Samsung Bluewings as the priority selection from university players, and in 2004, he started his military service in Gwangju Sangmu, which is the special team for talented football players. In 2007, he came back to Suwon Samsung Bluewings, but there was no room because the head coach changed and foreign defenders such as Mato Neretljak already got his position. Following this situation, he transferred to Jeonbuk Hyundai because current Korea National Team head coach Choi Kang-Hee really wanted him. He was the member of K-League Champion in 2009 and 2011 and runner-up of AFC Champions League in 2011. In 2012, he moved to Henan Jianye F.C. in China Super League and played 43 games as defensive midfielder and central defender.

==== Career statistics ====
Club	Year	Apps	Goal	Assist
Suwon Samsung	2001~2004	45	0	2
Gwangju Sangmu	2005~2006	19	1	6
Suwon Samsung	2007~2008	5	0	
Jeonbuk Hyundai	2009~2011	40	3	0
Henan Jianye F.C.	2012~2014	64	4	0
Total (K-League)	-	109	4	8
Total (China Super League)	-	64	4	0

K-League records include K-League Cup records as of the end of 2010.

=== Play Style ===
The coaching staff at Jeonbuk Hyundai noted his strong understanding of the game. Because of his height and strength, he was able to win many air ball duel. He also used his technical skills to contribute to the team's attacking play.
