= Kim Min-sik (footballer) =

South Korean footballer (born 1985)

Personal information
- Date of birth: October 29, 1985 (age 41)
- Place of birth: South Korea
- Height: 1.87 m (6 ft 2 in)
- Position: Goalkeeper

Team information
- Current team: FC Anyang
- Number: 1

Senior career*
Years	Team	Apps	(Gls)
2008–2014	Jeonbuk Hyundai Motors	37	(0)
2013–2014	→ Sangju Sangmu (army)	21	(0)
2015–2016	Jeonnam Dragons	17	(0)
2017–	FC Anyang	17	(0)
- * Club domestic league appearances and goals as of 1 January 2018

- Kim Min-sik
- Hangul: 김민식
- Hanja: 金敏植
- RR: Gim Minsik
- MR: Kim Minsik

Kim Min-sik (Korean: 김민식; born October 29, 1985) is a South Korean football goalkeeper who plays for FC Anyang in the K League Challenge. He has previously played for the Jeonbuk Hyundai Motors, Sangju Sangmu, and Jeonnam Dragons.
