= Ha Sung-min =

South Korean footballer (born 1987)

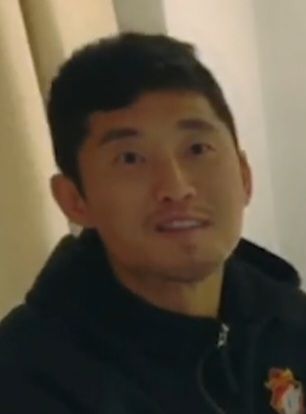

Personal information
- Date of birth: June 13, 1987 (age 39)
- Place of birth: Incheon, South Korea
- Height: 1.84 m (6 ft 0 in)
- Position: Midfielder

Team information
- Current team: Gyeongnam FC
- Number: 4

Youth career
- 2003–2005: Bupyeong High School

Senior career*
| Years | Team | Apps | (Gls) |
| 2006–2007 | Incheon United | 0 | (0) |
| 2008–2013 | Jeonbuk Hyundai Motors | 7 | (0) |
| 2010 | → Busan I'Park (loan) | 1 | (0) |
| 2012–2013 | → Sangju Sangmu (army) | 39 | (0) |
| 2014 | Muaither | 11 | (0) |
| 2014–2016 | Ulsan Hyundai | 69 | (0) |
| 2017–2018 | Kyoto Sanga | 24 | (0) |
| 2018– | Gyeongnam FC | 45 | (0) |
- * Club domestic league appearances and goals as of 3 January 2019

- Ha Sung-min
- Hangul: 하성민
- Hanja: 河成敏
- RR: Ha Seongmin
- MR: Ha Sŏngmin

Ha Sung-min (Korean: 하성민; born June 13, 1987) is a South Korean football player who plays for Gyeongnam FC in K League 1. His brother Ha Dae-sung is also a footballer.
