= Jin Kyung-sun =

South Korean footballer (born 1980)

Jin Kyung-Sun
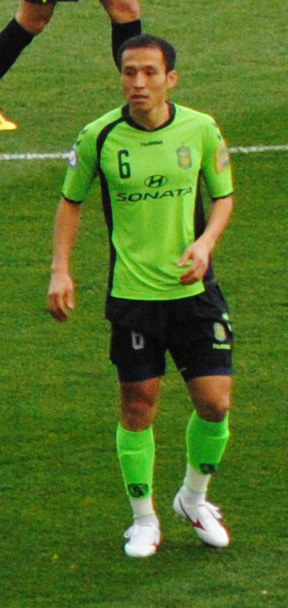

Personal information
- Full name: Jin Kyung-Sun
- Date of birth: April 10, 1980 (age 46)
- Place of birth: South Korea
- Height: 1.78 m (5 ft 10 in)
- Positions: Full back; defensive midfielder

Youth career
- Ajou University

Senior career*
Years	Team	Apps	(Gls)
2003	Bucheon SK	4	(0)
2004–2005	Ulsan Hyundai Mipo Dolphin	0	(0)
2006–2008	Daegu FC	58	(1)
2009–2012	Jeonbuk Hyundai Motors	69	(1)
2013	Gangwon FC	35	(1)
2014–2017	Gyeongnam FC	67	(2)
- * Club domestic league appearances and goals as of 5 November 2017

Jin Kyung-Sun (Korean: 진경선; born April 10, 1980) is a South Korean retired football player.

His previous club is Jeonbuk Hyundai Motors, Daegu FC, Bucheon SK and Ulsan Hyundai Mipo Dolphin in Korea National League.

== Club career ==
- 2003 Bucheon SK
- 2004–2005 Ulsan Hyundai Mipo Dolphin
- 2006–2008 Daegu FC
- 2009–2012 Jeonbuk Hyundai Motors
- 2013–present Gangwon FC
