= 2012 Busan IPark season =

Busan IPark
2012 season
- Chairman: Chung Mong-Gyu
- Manager: Ahn Ik-Soo
- K-League: 6th
- Korean FA Cup: Round of 32
- Top goalscorer: League: Yoon Dong-Min (4); All: Yoon Dong-Min (4)
- Highest home attendance: 8,714 vs Chunnam (May 28)
- Lowest home attendance: 929 vs Gangwon (April 21)
- Average home league attendance: 4,678 (as of May 28)
| Home colours | Away colours |

The 2012 season was Busan IPark's thirtieth season in the K-League in South Korea. Busan IPark will be competing in K-League and Korean FA Cup.

== Current squad ==
Note: Flags indicate national team as defined under FIFA eligibility rules; some limited exceptions apply. Players may hold more than one non-FIFA nationality.

| No. | Pos. | Nation | Player |
|---|---|---|---|
| 1 | GK | KOR | Lee Beom-Young |
| 2 | DF | BRA | Éder Baiano (on loan from Rio Preto) |
| 3 | DF | KOR | Kang Dae-Ho |
| 4 | MF | KOR | Park Jong-Woo |
| 5 | DF | KOR | Lee Yo-Han |
| 6 | DF | KOR | Lee Kyung-Ryul |
| 7 | MF | BRA | Fagner |
| 8 | FW | KOR | Yoon Dong-Min |
| 9 | FW | BRA | José Mota |
| 10 | MF | AUS | Matt McKay |
| 11 | MF | KOR | Lim Sang-Hyub |
| 13 | FW | KOR | Choi Jin-Ho |
| 14 | MF | KOR | Kim Han-Yoon |
| 15 | MF | KOR | Kim Ik-Hyun |
| 17 | DF | KOR | Jeon Jae-Ho |
| 18 | DF | KOR | Park Yong-Ho |
| 19 | FW | KOR | Kim Ji-Min |
| 20 | DF | KOR | Hwang Sun-Pil |
| 21 | GK | KOR | Jeon Sang-Wook |
| 22 | FW | KOR | Han Ji-Ho |

| No. | Pos. | Nation | Player |
|---|---|---|---|
| 23 | MF | KOR | Kim Tae-Jun |
| 24 | DF | KOR | Yeo Hyo-Jin |
| 25 | DF | KOR | Lee Hyeon-Do |
| 26 | DF | KOR | Lee Won-Kyu |
| 27 | DF | KOR | Kim Chang-Soo |
| 28 | MF | KOR | Lee Jong-Won |
| 29 | FW | KOR | Kim Hyung-Pil |
| 30 | MF | KOR | Yun Yeong-No |
| 31 | GK | KOR | Lee Chang-Geun |
| 32 | DF | KOR | Ku Hyeon-Jun |
| 34 | DF | KOR | Yu Ji-Hun |
| 35 | DF | KOR | Yu Su-Cheol |
| 36 | MF | KOR | Kyung Jae-Yoon (on loan from FC Seoul) |
| 39 | DF | KOR | Hwang Jae-Hun |
| 40 | MF | KOR | Lee Sung-Woon |
| 47 | MF | KOR | Jeong Min-Hyeong |
| 55 | MF | KOR | Ju Se-Jong |
| 77 | MF | KOR | Choi Kwang-Hee |
| 99 | FW | KOR | Bang Seung-Hwan |

=== Out on loan ===
Note: Flags indicate national team as defined under FIFA eligibility rules; some limited exceptions apply. Players may hold more than one non-FIFA nationality.

| No. | Pos. | Nation | Player |
|---|---|---|---|
| 33 | DF | KOR | Jang Hak-Young (to Seoul United FC) |
| — | FW | KOR | Yang Dong-Hyun (to National Police Agency FC) |

| No. | Pos. | Nation | Player |

== Transfer ==
=== In ===
| Date | Pos. | Player | From | Fee | Ref |
|---|---|---|---|---|---|
| 9 November 2011 | DF | (South Korea) Ku Hyun-Jun | (South Korea) Dongnae High School | Youth | |
| 9 November 2011 | FW | (South Korea) Kim Ji-Min | (South Korea) Dongnae High School | Youth | |
| 9 November 2011 | DF | (South Korea) Yoo Soo-Chul | (South Korea) Dongnae High School | Youth | |
| 9 November 2011 | GK | (South Korea) Lee Chang-Geun | (South Korea) Dongnae High School | Youth | |
| 9 November 2011 | FW | (South Korea) Ju Se-Jong | (South Korea) Konkuk University | Draft (1st) | |
| 9 November 2011 | DF | (South Korea) Lee Hyun-Do | (South Korea) Yeungnam University | Draft (2nd) | |
| 9 November 2011 | MF | (South Korea) Yoon Young-No | (South Korea) Soongsil University | Draft (Extra) | |
| 18 November 2011 | FW | (South Korea) Kim Hyung-Pil | (South Korea) Chunnam Dragons | Traded | |
| 21 November 2011 | FW | (South Korea) Bang Seung-Hwan | (South Korea) FC Seoul | Traded | |
| 21 November 2011 | DF | (South Korea) Yeo Hyo-Jin | (South Korea) FC Seoul | Traded | |
| 22 November 2011 | DF | (South Korea) Lee Kyung-Ryul | (South Korea) Gyeongnam FC | Traded | |

=== Out ===
| Date | Pos. | Player | To | Fee | Ref |
|---|---|---|---|---|---|
| 18 November 2011 | FW | (South Korea) Yang Dong-Hyun | (South Korea) Korean Police FC | Military duty | |
| 18 November 2011 | DF | (South Korea) Lee Dong-Won | (South Korea) Korean Police FC | Military duty | |
| 18 November 2011 | FW | (South Korea) Kim Geun-Cheol | (South Korea) Chunnam Dragons | Traded | |
| 21 November 2011 | MF | (South Korea) Park Hee-Do | (South Korea) FC Seoul | Traded | |
| 22 November 2011 | MF | (South Korea) Yoo Ho-Joon | (South Korea) Gyeongnam FC | Traded | |
| 8 December 2011 | MF | (South Korea) Shin In-Seob | Unattached | Free agent | |

== Coaching staff ==
| Position | Staff |
|---|---|
| Manager | (South Korea) Ahn Ik-Soo |
| Assistant Manager | (South Korea) Kim In-Wan |
| Coach | (South Korea) Baek Ki-Hong |
| GK Coach | (South Korea) Shin Eui-Son |
| Physical Coach | (Brazil) Paulo Sergio Garcia |

Last updated: 5 March 2012
Source: Busan IPark

== Match results ==
=== K-League ===
All times are Korea Standard Time (KST) – UTC+9

| Date Round | Home | Score | Away | Location |

| 4 March 1 | Suwon | 1 – 0 | Busan | Suwon, Gyeonggi |
| 15:00 | Éverton 41' | Report | Kim Han-Yoon (yellow card) 56' (yellow-red card) 86' | Stadium: Suwon World Cup Stadium; Attendance: 23,427; Referee: Kim Sung-Ho |

| 10 March 2 | Busan | 1 – 1 | Jeju | Yeonje-gu, Busan |
| 17:00 | Bang Seung-Hwan 41' | Report | Kim Chang-Soo 58' (o.g.) | Stadium: Busan Asiad Stadium; Attendance: 7,487; Referee: Yoo Sun-Ho |

| 17 March 3 | Pohang | 2 – 2 | Busan | Pohang, Gyeongbuk |
| 17:00 | Zicu 9', 37' | Report | Kim Han-Yoon 41' (Assist by No.4); Lee Jong-Won 69' (Assist by No.4) | Stadium: Pohang Steel Yard; Attendance: 9,134; Referee: Ko Keum-Bok |

| 24 March 4 | Busan | 1 – 2 | Gwangju | Yeonje-gu, Busan |
| 15:00 | Lim Sang-Hyub 52' (Assist by No.4) | Report | Lim Sun-Young 9'; João Paulo 65' | Stadium: Busan Asiad Stadium; Attendance: 2,899; Referee: Kim Sung-Ho |

| 30 March 5 | Seongnam | 0 – 1 | Busan | Seongnam, Gyeonggi |
| 19:30 | | Report | Kim Chang-Soo 88' (Assist by No.7) | Stadium: Tancheon Sports Complex; Attendance: 1,886; Referee: Song Min-Seok |

| 7 April 6 | Daejeon | 0 – 1 | Busan | Yuseong-gu, Daejeon |
| 15:00 | | Report | Fagner 88' (Assist by No.10) | Stadium: Daejeon World Cup Stadium; Attendance: 1,842; Referee: Kim Sang-Woo |

| 11 April 7 | Busan | 0 – 0 | Seoul | Yeonje-gu, Busan |
| 15:00 | | Report | | Stadium: Busan Asiad Stadium; Attendance: 3,122; Referee: Choi Myung-Yong |

| 14 April 8 | Jeonbuk | 0 – 0 | Busan | Jeonju, Jeonbuk |
| 17:00 | | Report | | Stadium: Jeonju World Cup Stadium; Attendance: 7,820; Referee: Hong Jin-Ho |

| 21 April 9 | Busan | 1 – 0 | Gangwon | Yeonje-gu, Busan |
| 17:00 | Choi Jin-Ho 25' | Report | | Stadium: Busan Asiad Stadium; Attendance: 929; Referee: An Yong-Hee |

| 28 April 10 | Sangju | 1 – 2 | Busan | Sangju, Gyeongbuk |
| 17:00 | Kim Chi-Gon 77' | Report | Park Jong-Woo 40' (Assist by No.10); Lee Jong-Won 51' (Assist by No.10) | Stadium: Sangju Civic Stadium; Attendance: 1,063; Referee: Song Min-Seok |

| 5 May 11 | Busan | 1 – 0 | Gyeongnam | Yeonje-gu, Busan |
| 15:00 | Bang Seung-Hwan 38' (Assist by No.10) | Report | | Stadium: Busan Asiad Stadium; Attendance: 4,401; Referee: Choi Myung-Yong |

| 13 May 12 | Busan | 2 – 0 | Daegu | Yeonje-gu, Busan |
| 15:00 | Park Jong-Woo 40' (Assist by No.10); Hwang Soon-Min 90+3' (o.g.) | Report | Kim Kee-Hee (red card) 59' | Stadium: Busan Asiad Stadium; Attendance: 5,197; Referee: Kim Wan-Tae |

| 19 May 13 | Incheon | 0 – 0 | Busan | Nam-gu, Incheon |
| 15:00 | | Report | | Stadium: Incheon Football Stadium; Attendance: 2,361; Referee: Kim Sang-Woo |

| 28 May 14 | Busan | 0 – 0 | Chunnam | Yeonje-gu, Busan |
| 15:00 | | Report | | Stadium: Busan Asiad Stadium; Attendance: 8,714; Referee: Yoo Seon-Ho |

| 14 June 15 | Ulsan | 2 – 1 | Busan | Nam-gu, Ulsan |
| 19:00 | Kim Seung-Yong 22', 35' | Report | Kim Chang-Soo 33' | Stadium: Ulsan Munsu Football Stadium; Attendance: 2,598; Referee: Lee Min-Hu |

| 17 June 16 | Busan | 1 – 0 | Seongnam | Yeonje-gu, Busan |
| 19:00 | Lee Kyung-Ryul 61' | Report | | Stadium: Busan Asiad Stadium; Attendance: 9,276; Referee: Song Min-Seok |

| 24 June 17 | Daegu | 2 – 1 | Busan | Suseong-gu, Daegu |
| 19:00 | Lee Jin-Ho 35', 67' | Report | Yoon Dong-Min (0:49) | Stadium: Daegu Stadium; Attendance: 6,615; Referee: Ko Keum-Bok |

| 27 June 18 | Jeju | 5 – 2 | Busan | Seogwipo, Jeju |
| 19:00 | Jair 11', 60'; Santos 36', 63'; Seo Dong-Hyun 57' | Report(English); Report(Korean) | Éder Baiano (yellow card) 14' (yellow-red card) 33'; Han Ji-Ho 49' (Free kick); Yoon Dong-Min 79' (Assist by No.22) | Stadium: Jeju World Cup Stadium; Attendance: 2,762; Referee: Kim Sung-Ho |

| 30 June 19 | Busan | 3 – 1 | Daejeon | Yeonje-gu, Busan |
| 19:00 | Han Geuru 3' (o.g.); Yu Ji-Hun (yellow card) 27'; Kim Han-Yoon (yellow card) 33'; Park Yong-Ho 74'; Han Ji-Ho 80' | Report(Kor); Report(Eng) | Yuta Baba 33' (pen.), (yellow card) 61'; Han Geuru (yellow card) 47'; Heo Beom-San (yellow card) 54'; Kim Tae-Yeon (yellow card) 68' | Stadium: Busan Asiad Stadium; Attendance: 2,917; Referee: Choi Myung-Yong |

| 8 July 20 | Busan | 1 – 2 | Incheon | Yeonje-gu, Busan |
| 19:00 | Kim Han-Yoon (yellow card) 62'; Yoon Dong-Min 77' | Report(Kor) Report(Eng) | Lee Yun-Pyo (yellow card) 39'; Lee Kyu-Ro (yellow card) 48'; Han Kyo-Won 57'; Jung In-Hwan 89' | Stadium: Busan Asiad Stadium; Attendance: 3,278; Referee: Lee Min-Hu |

| 15 July 21 | Chunnam | 2 – 3 | Busan | Gwangyang, Jeonnam |
| 19:00 | Henan Faria da Silveira 3'; An Jae-Jun (yellow card) 64'; Lúcio Flávio 76' | Report | Eder Luís de Carvalho (yellow card) 1'; Lim Sang-Hyub (yellow card) 21'; Bang Seung-Hwan 31'; Yoon Dong-Min 45+2'; Fágner (yellow card) 74'; Han Ji-Ho 84' | Stadium: Gwangyang Football Stadium; Attendance: 2,204; Referee: Kim Wan-Tae |

| 21 July 22 | Seoul | 6 – 0 | Busan | Mapo-gu, Seoul |
| 19:00 | Molina 8'; Ko Myong-Jin 14'; Kim Jin-Kyu 25' (pen.), 63' (yellow card) 70'; Escudero 52'; Damjanović 67'; Ha Dae-Sung (yellow card) 72' | Report | Jeon Sang-Wook (yellow card) 21'; Jang Hak-Young (yellow card) 37'; Lee Kyung-Ryul (yellow card) 46' | Stadium: Seoul World Cup Stadium; Attendance: 24,583; Referee: Yoo Sun-Ho |

| 25 July 23 | Busan | 1 – 0 | Ulsan | Yeonje-gu, Busan |
| 19:30 | Lim Sang-Hyub 69'; Kim Han-Yoon (yellow card) 73' | Report | Kim Shin-Wook (yellow card) 52' | Stadium: Busan Asiad Stadium; Attendance: 2,207; Referee: Kim Jong-Hyeok |

| 29 July 24 | Busan | 0 – 0 | Pohang | Yeonje-gu, Busan |
| 19:00 | Fágner (yellow card) 33'; Lee Jong-Won (yellow card) 78' | Report | | Stadium: Busan Asiad Stadium; Attendance: 2,733; Referee: Ko Hyung-Jin |

| 4 August 25 | Gwangju | 0 – 2 | Busan | Seo-gu, Gwangju |
| 19:00 | Lee Han-Saem (yellow card) 42'; Kim Dong-Sub (yellow card) 58'; Jeong Woo-In (yellow card) 71'; Yoo Jong-Hyun (yellow card) 80' | Report | Fágner 15'; Choi Kwang-Hee (yellow card) 31'; Jang Hak-Young (yellow card) 83'; Yoo Ji-Hoon 90+1' | Stadium: Gwangju World Cup Stadium; Attendance: 1,081; Referee: Hong Jin-Ho |

| 8 August 26 | Busan | 0 – 0 | Suwon | Yeonje-gu, Busan |
| 20:00 | Fágner (yellow card) 14'; Park Yong-Ho (yellow card) 23'; Kim Han-Yoon (yellow card) 55' | Report(Eng); Report(Kor) | Yang Sang-Min (yellow card) 35'; Eddy Bosnar (yellow card) 59'; Stevo (yellow card) 79' | Stadium: Busan Asiad Stadium; Attendance: 4,233; Referee: Ahn Yong-Hee |

| 11 August 27 | Busan | 0 – 0 | Jeonbuk | Yeonje-gu, Busan |
| 19:00 | | Report(Eng); Report(Kor) | Leonardo (yellow card) 50'; Kim Hyun (yellow card) 90+4' | Stadium: Busan Asiad Stadium; Attendance: 3,583; Referee: Kim Sung-Ho |

| 18 August 28 | Gangwon | 1 – 2 | Busan | Gangneung, Gangwon |
| 18:00 | Wesley 47' | Report | Bang Seung-Hwan 10'; Jang Hak-Young (yellow card) 47'; Fágner (yellow card) 82'; McKay 90+2' | Stadium: Gangneung Stadium; Attendance: 3,166; Referee: Kim Jong-Hyeok |

| 22 August 29 | Gyeongnam | 2 – 0 | Busan | Changwon, Gyeongnam |
| 20:30 | Kim In-Han 71'; Caíque 90' | Report | | Stadium: Changwon Football Center |

| 26 August 30 | Busan | 0 – 0 | Sangju | Yeonje-gu, Busan |
| 20:00 | Jang Hak-Young (yellow card) 35' | Summary | | Stadium: Busan Asiad Stadium; Attendance: 9,537; Referee: Kim Sang-Woo |

| 16 September 31 | Busan | 0 – 2 | FC Seoul | Yeonje-gu, Busan |
| 16:00 | Lee Kyung-Ryul (yellow card) 33'; Lee Jong-Won (yellow card) 49' | Summary | Damjanović 9'; Molina 78' | Stadium: Busan Asiad Stadium; Attendance: 2,317; Referee: Choi Myung-Yong |

| 23 September 32 | Ulsan Hyundai | 2 – 2 | Busan | Ulsan |
| 18:00 | Lee Seung-Yeoul 50'; Maranhão (yellow card) 77'; Kang Min-Soo 90+2' | Summary | Bang Seung-Hwan (yellow card) 43'; Han Ji-Ho 47'; Park Jong-Woo (yellow card) 56'; Kim Han-Yoon 90'; Lim Sang-Hyub (yellow card) 90+1' | Stadium: Ulsan Munsu Football Stadium; Attendance: 4,575; Referee: Song Min-Seok |

| 26 September 33 | Gyeongnam FC | 1 – 0 | Busan | South Gyeongsang Province, Changwon |
| 20:30 | Kang Min-hyuk (yellow card) 17'; Yoon Sin-Young (yellow card) 46'; Kang Seung-Jo 56'; Caíque (yellow card) 71' | Summary | Éder Baiano (yellow card) 4' (yellow-red card) 78'; Lee Jong-Won (yellow card) 24' (yellow-red card) 30'; McKay (yellow card) 38' (yellow-red card) 80'; Park Jong-Woo (yellow card) 59'; Jang Hak-Young (yellow card) 64' | Stadium: Changwon Football Center; Attendance: 1,184; Referee: Kim Sung-Ho |

| 3 October 34 | Busan | 2 – 2 | Jeonbuk Hyundai Motors | Yeonje-gu, Busan |
| 18:00 | Bang Seung-Hwan 6' (pen.); Han Ji-Ho 31'; Lee Kyung-Ryul (yellow card) 51'; Choi Kwang-Hee (yellow card) 71' | Summary | Lee Dong-Gook 21' (pen.); Park Se-Jik (yellow card) 26'; Jung Hoon (yellow card) 37'; Eninho 80'; Kim Hyun (yellow card) 90' | Stadium: Busan Asiad Stadium; Attendance: 3,013; Referee: Min-Hu Lee |

| 6 October 35 | Busan | 0 – 1 | Suwon Samsung Bluewings | Yeonje-gu, Busan |
| 16:00 | | Summary | Éder Baiano 34' (o.g.); Yang Sang-Min (yellow card) 64'; Lee Sang-ho (yellow card) 77' | Stadium: Busan Asiad Stadium; Attendance: 4,025; Referee: Sun-Ho Yoo |

| 24 October 36 | Pohang Steelers | 0 – 2 | Busan | North Gyeongsang Province, Pohang |
| 20:30 | Jung Hong-Youn (yellow card) 35'; Ko Mu-Yeol (yellow card) 87' | Summary | Park Jong-Woo 5'; Éder Baiano (yellow card) 29'; Kim Han-Yoon (yellow card) 46'; Jang Hak-Young (yellow card) 82'; Han Ji-Ho 82' | Stadium: Pohang Steel Yard; Attendance: 5,418; Referee: Sang-Il Woo |

| 27 October 37 | Jeju United | 2 – 1 | Busan | Jeju Province, Jeju |
| 16:00 | Renan Marques 7' (pen.); Choi Won-Kwon (yellow card) 51'; Seo Dong-Hyun 90' | Summary | Renan Marques 45' (o.g.); McKay (yellow card) 51' | Stadium: Jeju World Cup Stadium; Attendance: 4,767; Referee: Sung-Ho Kim |

| 4 November 38 | Jeonbuk Hyundai Motors | 3 – 0 | Busan | North Jeolla Province, Jeonju |
| 18:00 | Lee Dong-Gook 26' (pen.), 73'; Kim Sang-Sik (yellow card) 37'; Leonardo 58'; Choi Eun-Sung (yellow card) 87' | Summary | Kim Han-Yoon (yellow card) 52'; Lee Sung-Woon (yellow card) 71'; Éder Baiano (yellow card) 79' | Stadium: Jeonju World Cup Stadium; Attendance: 6,106; Referee: Sang-Woo Kim |

| 11 November 39 | Busan | 0 – 0 | Gyeongnam FC | Yeonje-gu, Busan |
| 16:00 | Bang Seung-Hwan (yellow card) 28' | Summary | Kang Min-hyuk (yellow card) 54' | Stadium: Busan Asiad Stadium; Attendance: 1,723; Referee: Hyung-Jin Ko |

| 18 November 40 | Busan | 1 – 2 | Jeju United | Yeonje-gu, Busan |
| 16:00 | Park Jong-Woo (yellow card) 53'; Madaschi 76' (o.g.); Lee Kyung-Ryul (yellow card) 78' | Summary | Jair 21', 50'; Seo Dong-Hyun (yellow card) 57'; Madaschi (yellow card) 81' | Stadium: Busan Asiad Stadium; Attendance: 3,132; Referee: Jong-Hyeok Kim |

| 21 November 41 | Busan | 1 – 1 | Pohang Steelers | Yeonje-gu, Busan |
| 20:30 | Lee Myung-Joo 5' (o.g.); Lee Jong-Won (yellow card) 40' | Summary | Cho Chan-Ho (yellow card) 7'; Shin Kwang-Hoon (yellow card) 8'; Hwang Jin-Sung 16'; Jung Hong-Youn (yellow card) 52'; Yoon Jun-Sung (yellow card) 65'; Hwang Ji-Soo (yellow card) 88' | Stadium: Busan Asiad Stadium; Attendance: 1,412; Referee: Myung-Yong Choi |

| 25 November 42 | Suwon Samsung Bluewings | 2 – 1 | Busan | Suwon |
| 16:00 | Ristić (yellow card) 2'; Kwak Hee-Ju (yellow card) 20'; Yang Sang-Min (yellow card) 27' (yellow-red card); Park Yong-Ho 30' (o.g.); Kim Do-Heon 34' | Summary | Kim Han-Yoon (yellow card) 31' (yellow-red card); Park Yong-Ho (yellow card) 80'; Lim Sang-Hyub 90+4' | Stadium: Suwon World Cup Stadium; Attendance: 15,557; Referee: Dong-Jun Lee |

| 29 November 43 | Busan | 0 – 1 | Ulsan Hyundai | Yeonje-gu, Busan |
| 20:30 | Lee Kyung-Ryul (yellow card) 19' | Summary | Rafinha 87' | Stadium: Busan Asiad Stadium; Attendance: 2,209; Referee: Jin-Ho Hong |

| 2 December 44 | FC Seoul | 2 – 1 | Busan | Seoul |
| 16:00 | Ko Yo-Han (yellow card) 34'; Damjanović 43'; Jung Jo-Gook 58' | Summary | Park Yong-Ho 2'; Lim Sang-Hyub (yellow card) 33'; Éder Baiano (yellow card) 66'; Kim Chang-Soo (yellow card) 74' | Stadium: Seoul World Cup Stadium; Attendance: 20,184; Referee: Sung-Ho Kim |

==== League table ====
| Pos | Team | Pld | W | D | L | GF | GA | GD | Pts |
|---|---|---|---|---|---|---|---|---|---|
| 5 | Ulsan Hyundai | 44 | 18 | 14 | 12 | 60 | 52 | +8 | 68 |
| 6 | Jeju United | 44 | 16 | 15 | 13 | 71 | 56 | +15 | 63 |
| 7 | Busan IPark | 44 | 13 | 14 | 17 | 40 | 51 | −11 | 53 |
| 8 | Gyeongnam FC | 44 | 14 | 8 | 22 | 50 | 60 | −10 | 50 |
| 9 | Incheon United | 44 | 17 | 16 | 11 | 46 | 40 | +6 | 67 |

Source: K League
Rules for classification: 1) Points; 2) Goal difference; 3) Goals scored.

==== Results summary ====
| Overall | | | | | | | | Home | | | | | | Away | | | | | |
| Pld | W | D | L | GF | GA | GD | Pts | W | D | L | GF | GA | GD | W | D | L | GF | GA | GD |
|---|---|---|---|---|---|---|---|---|---|---|---|---|---|---|---|---|---|---|---|
| 44 | 13 | 14 | 17 | 40 | 51 | −11 | 53 | 6 | 10 | 6 | 16 | 15 | +1 | 7 | 4 | 11 | 24 | 36 | −12 |

==== Results by round ====
| Round | 1 | 2 | 3 | 4 | 5 | 6 | 7 | 8 | 9 | 10 | 11 | 12 | 13 | 14 | 15 | 16 | 17 | 18 | 19 | 20 | 21 | 22 | 23 | 24 | 25 | 26 | 27 | 28 | 29 | 30 | 31 | 32 | 33 | 34 | 35 | 36 | 37 | 38 | 39 | 40 | 41 | 42 | 43 | 44 |
|---|---|---|---|---|---|---|---|---|---|---|---|---|---|---|---|---|---|---|---|---|---|---|---|---|---|---|---|---|---|---|---|---|---|---|---|---|---|---|---|---|---|---|---|---|
| Ground | A | H | A | H | A | A | H | A | H | A | H | H | A | H | A | H | A | A | H | H | A | A | H | H | A | H | H | A | A | H | H | A | A | H | H | A | A | A | H | H | H | A | H | A |
| Result | L | D | D | L | W | W | D | D | W | W | W | W | D | D | L | W | L | L | W | L | W | L | W | D | W | D | D | W | L | D | L | D | L | D | L | W | L | L | D | L | D | L | L | L |
| Position | 12 | 10 | 11 | 15 | 10 | 9 | 9 | 9 | 7 | 6 | 5 | 5 | 6 | 6 | 6 | 6 | 6 | 6 | 6 | 6 | 6 | 6 | 6 | 6 | 6 | 6 | 5 | 6 | 6 | 6 | 7 | 7 | 7 | 7 | 7 | 7 | 7 | 7 | 7 | 7 | 7 | 7 | 7 | 7 |

Updated to match(es) played on 2 December 2012. Source: League Fixtures and Results
A = Away; H = Home; W = Win; D = Draw; L = Loss

=== Korean FA Cup ===
| 23 May Round of 32 | Busan IPark | 0 – 1 | Goyang Kookmin Bank | Yeonje-gu, Busan |
| 19:30 | | | Lee Jae-Won 66' | Stadium: Busan Asiad Stadium |

=== Friendly tournament ===
==== Hawaiian Islands Invitational ====
| 23 January Semifinal | Busan IPark (South Korea) | 0 – 0 (4 – 3 p) | (Australia) Melbourne Heart | Honolulu, United States |
| 18:00 UTC-10 | | Report | | Stadium: Aloha Stadium; Attendance: 7,388; Referee: Hilario Grajeda (United States) |
| | Penalties |
| | Choi Kwang-Hee (penalty scored); Yoon Dong-Min (penalty scored); Lee Jong-Won (penalty missed); José Mota (penalty scored); Fágner (penalty missed); Han Ji-Ho (penalty missed); Yoo Ji-Hoon (penalty scored) | | (penalty scored) Walker; (penalty scored) Bosnjak; (penalty scored) Groenewald; (penalty missed) Patterson; (penalty missed) Trifiro; (penalty missed) Gray; (penalty missed) Grossman |

| 26 January Final | Busan IPark (South Korea) | 3 – 0 | (Japan) Yokohama FC | Honolulu, United States |
| 19:30 UTC-10 | Bang Seung-Hwan 14'; Lim Sang-Hyub 45'; Fágner 70' | Report | | Stadium: Aloha Stadium; Attendance: 10,073; Referee: Baldomero Toledo (United States) |

== Squad statistics ==
=== Appearances ===
Statistics accurate as of match played 28 June 2012

| No. | Nat. | Pos. | Name | League | | FA Cup | | Appearances | | Goals |
| No. | Nat. | Pos. | Name | Apps | Goals | Apps | Goals | App (sub) | Total | Goals |
|---|---|---|---|---|---|---|---|---|---|---|
| 1 | (South Korea) | GK | Lee Beom-Young | 5 | 0 | 1 | 0 | 6 (0) | 6 | 0 |
| 2 | (Brazil) | DF | Éder Baiano | 18 | 0 | 1 | 0 | 19 (0) | 19 | 0 |
| 3 | (South Korea) | DF | Kang Dae-Ho | 0 | 0 | 0 | 0 | 0 | 0 | 0 |
| 4 | (South Korea) | MF | Park Jong-Woo | 16 | 2 | 1 | 0 | 17 (0) | 17 | 2 |
| 5 | (South Korea) | DF | Lee Yo-Han | 0 | 0 | 0 | 0 | 0 | 0 | 0 |
| 6 | (South Korea) | DF | Lee Kyung-Ryul | 16 | 1 | 1 | 0 | 17 (0) | 17 | 1 |
| 7 | (Brazil) | FW | Fagner | 7 (9) | 1 | 0 (1) | 0 | 7 (10) | 17 | 1 |
| 8 | (South Korea) | FW | Yoon Dong-Min | 3 (5) | 2 | 0 | 0 | 3 (5) | 8 | 2 |
| 9 | (Brazil) | FW | José Mota | 0 (1) | 0 | 0 (1) | 0 | 0 (2) | 2 | 0 |
| 10 | (Australia) | MF | Matt McKay | 12 | 0 | 1 | 0 | 13 (0) | 13 | 0 |
| 11 | (South Korea) | MF | Lim Sang-Hyub | 14 (1) | 1 | 0 (1) | 0 | 14 (2) | 16 | 1 |
| 13 | (South Korea) | FW | Choi Jin-Ho | 1 (4) | 1 | 0 | 0 | 1 (4) | 5 | 1 |
| 14 | (South Korea) | MF | Kim Han-Yoon | 14 (1) | 1 | 1 | 0 | 15 (1) | 16 | 1 |
| 15 | (South Korea) | MF | Kim Ik-Hyun | 0 | 0 | 0 | 0 | 0 | 0 | 0 |
| 17 | (South Korea) | DF | Jeon Jae-Ho | 0 (3) | 0 | 0 | 0 | 0 (3) | 3 | 0 |
| 18 | (South Korea) | DF | Park Yong-Ho | 9 (4) | 0 | 0 | 0 | 9 (4) | 13 | 0 |
| 19 | (South Korea) | FW | Kim Ji-Min | 0 | 0 | 0 | 0 | 0 | 0 | 0 |
| 20 | (South Korea) | DF | Hwang Sun-Pil | 0 | 0 | 0 | 0 | 0 | 0 | 0 |
| 21 | (South Korea) | GK | Jeon Sang-Wook | 13 | 0 | 0 | 0 | 13 (0) | 13 | 0 |
| 22 | (South Korea) | FW | Han Ji-Ho | 11 (7) | 1 | 1 | 0 | 12 (7) | 19 | 1 |
| 23 | (South Korea) | MF | Kim Tae-Jun | 0 (1) | 0 | 0 | 0 | 0 (1) | 1 | 0 |
| 24 | (South Korea) | DF | Yeo Hyo-Jin | 0 | 0 | 0 | 0 | 0 | 0 | 0 |
| 25 | (South Korea) | DF | Lee Hyeon-Do | 0 | 0 | 0 | 0 | 0 | 0 | 0 |
| 26 | (South Korea) | DF | Lee Won-Kyu | 0 | 0 | 0 | 0 | 0 | 0 | 0 |
| 27 | (South Korea) | DF | Kim Chang-Soo | 18 | 2 | 1 | 0 | 19 (0) | 19 | 2 |
| 28 | (South Korea) | MF | Lee Jong-Won | 9 (5) | 2 | 1 | 0 | 10 (5) | 15 | 2 |
| 29 | (South Korea) | FW | Kim Hyung-Pil | 0 (1) | 0 | 0 | 0 | 0 (1) | 1 | 0 |
| 30 | (South Korea) | MF | Yun Yeong-No | 0 | 0 | 0 | 0 | 0 | 0 | 0 |
| 31 | (South Korea) | GK | Lee Chang-Geun | 0 | 0 | 0 | 0 | 0 | 0 | 0 |
| 32 | (South Korea) | DF | Ku Hyeon-Jun | 0 (1) | 0 | 0 | 0 | 0 (1) | 1 | 0 |
| 34 | (South Korea) | DF | Yu Ji-Hun | 13 (3) | 0 | 1 | 0 | 14 (3) | 17 | 0 |
| 35 | (South Korea) | DF | Yu Su-Cheol | 0 | 0 | 0 | 0 | 0 | 0 | 0 |
| 36 | (South Korea) | MF | Kyung Jae-Yoon | 0 | 0 | 0 | 0 | 0 | 0 | 0 |
| 39 | (South Korea) | DF | Hwang Jae-Hun | 0 | 0 | 0 | 0 | 0 | 0 | 0 |
| 40 | (South Korea) | MF | Lee Sung-Woon | 1 | 0 | 0 | 0 | 1 (0) | 1 | 0 |
| 47 | (South Korea) | MF | Jeong Min-Hyeong | 1 (1) | 0 | 0 | 0 | 1 (1) | 2 | 0 |
| 55 | (South Korea) | MF | Ju Se-Jong | 0 | 0 | 0 | 0 | 0 | 0 | 0 |
| 77 | (South Korea) | MF | Choi Kwang-Hee | 5 (5) | 0 | 0 | 0 | 5 (5) | 10 | 0 |
| 99 | (South Korea) | FW | Bang Seung-Hwan | 11 (1) | 2 | 1 | 0 | 12 (1) | 13 | 2 |

=== Goals and assists ===
| Rank | Nation | Number | Name | K-League | | KFA Cup | | Sum | | Total |
| Rank | Nation | Number | Name | Goals | Assists | Goals | Assists | Goals | Assists | Total |
|---|---|---|---|---|---|---|---|---|---|---|
| 1 | (South Korea) | 4 | Park Jong-Woo | 2 | 3 | 0 | 0 | 2 | 3 | 5 |
| = | (Australia) | 10 | Matt McKay | 0 | 5 | 0 | 0 | 0 | 5 | 5 |
| 2 | (South Korea) | 8 | Yoon Dong-Min | 2 | 0 | 0 | 0 | 2 | 0 | 2 |
| = | (South Korea) | 27 | Kim Chang-Soo | 2 | 0 | 0 | 0 | 2 | 0 | 2 |
| = | (South Korea) | 28 | Lee Jong-Won | 2 | 0 | 0 | 0 | 2 | 0 | 2 |
| = | (South Korea) | 99 | Bang Seung-Hwan | 2 | 0 | 0 | 0 | 2 | 0 | 2 |
| = | (Brazil) | 7 | Fagner | 1 | 1 | 0 | 0 | 1 | 1 | 2 |
| = | (South Korea) | 22 | Han Ji-Ho | 1 | 1 | 0 | 0 | 1 | 1 | 2 |
| 3 | (South Korea) | 6 | Lee Kyung-Ryul | 1 | 0 | 0 | 0 | 1 | 0 | 1 |
| = | (South Korea) | 11 | Lim Sang-Hyub | 1 | 0 | 0 | 0 | 1 | 0 | 1 |
| = | (South Korea) | 13 | Choi Jin-Ho | 1 | 0 | 0 | 0 | 1 | 0 | 1 |
| = | (South Korea) | 14 | Kim Han-Yoon | 1 | 0 | 0 | 0 | 1 | 0 | 1 |
| = | (South Korea) | 18 | Park Yong-Ho | 0 | 1 | 0 | 0 | 0 | 1 | 1 |
| / | / | / | Own Goals | 1 | - | 0 | - | 1 | - | 1 |
| / | / | / | TOTALS | 17 | 11 | 0 | 0 | 17 | 11 | |

=== Discipline ===
| Position | Nation | Number | Name | K-League | | KFA Cup | | Total | |
| Position | Nation | Number | Name | Yellow card | Red card | Yellow card | Red card | Yellow card | Red card |
| DF | (Brazil) | 2 | Éder Baiano | 4 | 1 | 1 | 0 | 5 | 1 |
| MF | (South Korea) | 4 | Park Jong-Woo | 5 | 0 | 0 | 0 | 5 | 0 |
| DF | (South Korea) | 6 | Lee Kyung-Ryul | 1 | 0 | 1 | 0 | 2 | 0 |
| FW | (Brazil) | 7 | Fagner | 3 | 0 | 1 | 0 | 4 | 0 |
| FW | (South Korea) | 8 | Yoon Dong-Min | 1 | 0 | 0 | 0 | 1 | 0 |
| MF | (Australia) | 10 | Matt McKay | 3 | 0 | 0 | 0 | 3 | 0 |
| MF | (South Korea) | 11 | Lim Sang-Hyub | 2 | 0 | 0 | 0 | 2 | 0 |
| MF | (South Korea) | 14 | Kim Han-Yoon | 8 | 1 | 1 | 0 | 9 | 1 |
| GK | (South Korea) | 21 | Jeon Sang-Wook | 1 | 0 | 0 | 0 | 1 | 0 |
| FW | (South Korea) | 22 | Han Ji-Ho | 2 | 0 | 0 | 0 | 2 | 0 |
| MF | (South Korea) | 23 | Kim Tae-Jun | 1 | 0 | 0 | 0 | 1 | 0 |
| DF | (South Korea) | 27 | Kim Chang-Soo | 1 | 0 | 0 | 0 | 1 | 0 |
| MF | (South Korea) | 28 | Lee Jong-Won | 2 | 0 | 0 | 0 | 2 | 0 |
| FW | (South Korea) | 29 | Kim Hyung-Pil | 1 | 0 | 0 | 0 | 1 | 0 |
| MF | (South Korea) | 34 | Yu Ji-Hun | 1 | 0 | 0 | 0 | 1 | 0 |
| / | / | / | TOTALS | 36 | 2 | 4 | 0 | 40 | 2 |
