= 2012 Hawaiian Islands Invitational =

Tournament details
- Host country: United States
- Dates: February 23–25
- Teams: 4 (from 2 confederations)
- Venue: 1 (in 1 host city)

Final positions
- Champions: (South Korea) Busan IPark (1st title)
- Runners-up: (Japan) Yokohama FC
- Third place: (United States) Colorado Rapids
- Fourth place: (Australia) Melbourne Heart

Tournament statistics
- Matches played: 4
- Goals scored: 7 (1.75 per match)
- Attendance: 34,922 (8,731 per match)
- Top scorer: Hiroaki Namba (2 goals)

The 2012 Hawaiian Islands Invitational was an inter-confederation association football tournament contested in February 2012 in the state of Hawaii, United States, between 4 different clubs from the United States, Japan, South Korea and Australia. It is considered to be the successor to the now-defunct Pan-Pacific Championship.

== Teams ==
The 4 teams accepted the invitation and contested the tournament were:

- (United States) Colorado Rapids – Major League Soccer
- (Australia) Melbourne Heart FC – A-League
- (Japan) Yokohama FC – J. League Division 2
- (South Korea) Busan IPark – K-League

== Venue ==
The venue for the 2012 Hawaiian Islands Invitational is Aloha Stadium, a 50,000 seat multi-purpose stadium in the city of Honolulu. It has an artificial FieldTurf surface which replaced the original AstroTurf in 2003. It is currently hosts to the Hawaii Warriors in the NCAA, and has played host to the Hawai'i Bowl since 2002. It was also the venue for the inaugural Pan-Pacific Championship in 2008.

Honolulu
Aloha Stadium
Capacity: 50,000
Location of Hawaii in the United States.	Location of the host city of the 2012 Hawaiian Islands Invitational in Hawaii.

== Matches ==
=== Semi-finals ===
23 February 2012
18:00 UTC−10

Busan IPark (South Korea)	0–0	(Australia) Melbourne Heart
	Report
Penalties
Kwang-Hee (penalty scored); Dong-Min (penalty scored); Jong-Won (penalty missed); Mota (penalty scored); Fágner (penalty missed); Ji-Ho (penalty missed); Ji-Hoon (penalty scored)	4–3	(penalty scored) Z. Walker; (penalty scored) Bosnjak; (penalty scored) Groenwald; (penalty missed) Paterson; (penalty missed) Trifiro; (penalty missed) Gray; (penalty missed) Grossman

Aloha Stadium, Honolulu
Attendance: 7,388
Referee: Hilario Grajeda

23 February 2012
20:30 UTC−10

Yokohama FC (Japan)	2–1	(United States) Colorado Rapids
Namba 57', 64'	Report	Moor 73'

Aloha Stadium, Honolulu
Attendance: 7,388
Referee: Jair Marrufo

=== Third place play-off ===
25 February 2012
17:00 UTC−10

Melbourne Heart (Australia)	0–1	(United States) Colorado Rapids
	Report	Cascio 30'

Aloha Stadium, Honolulu
Attendance: 10,073
Referee: Ricardo Salazar

=== Final ===
25 February 2012
19:30 UTC−10

Busan IPark (South Korea)	3–0	(Japan) Yokohama FC
Seung-Hwan 14'; Sang-Hyub 45'; Fágner 70'	Report

Aloha Stadium, Honolulu
Attendance: 10,073
Referee: Baldomero Toledo

2012 Hawaiian Islands Invitational champions
(South Korea)
Busan IPark
1st title
