= 2013 Lunar New Year Cup =

International football competition

The 87th 2013 Lunar New Year Cup (Chinese: 蛇年賀歲盃), also known as the China Mobile Satellite Communication Cup (Chinese: 中國移動衛星通信盃) due to sponsorship reason, is the annual football event held in Hong Kong in Lunar New Year. The name of this event was changed back to Lunar New Year Cup after two editions of Asian Challenge Cup were held in 2011 and 2012.

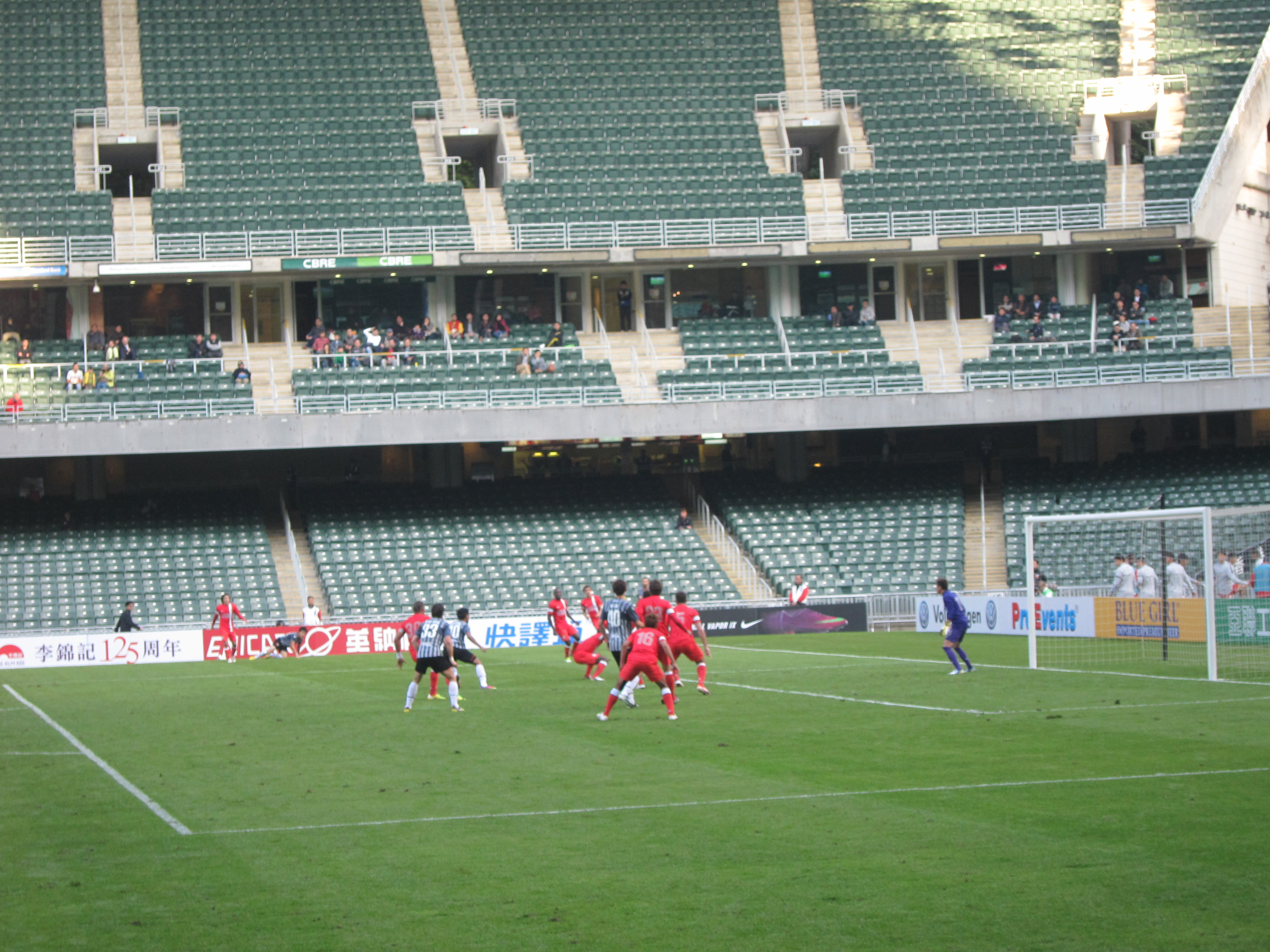
3rd Place Match of 2013 Lunar New Year Cup Hong Kong League XI vs Muangthong United

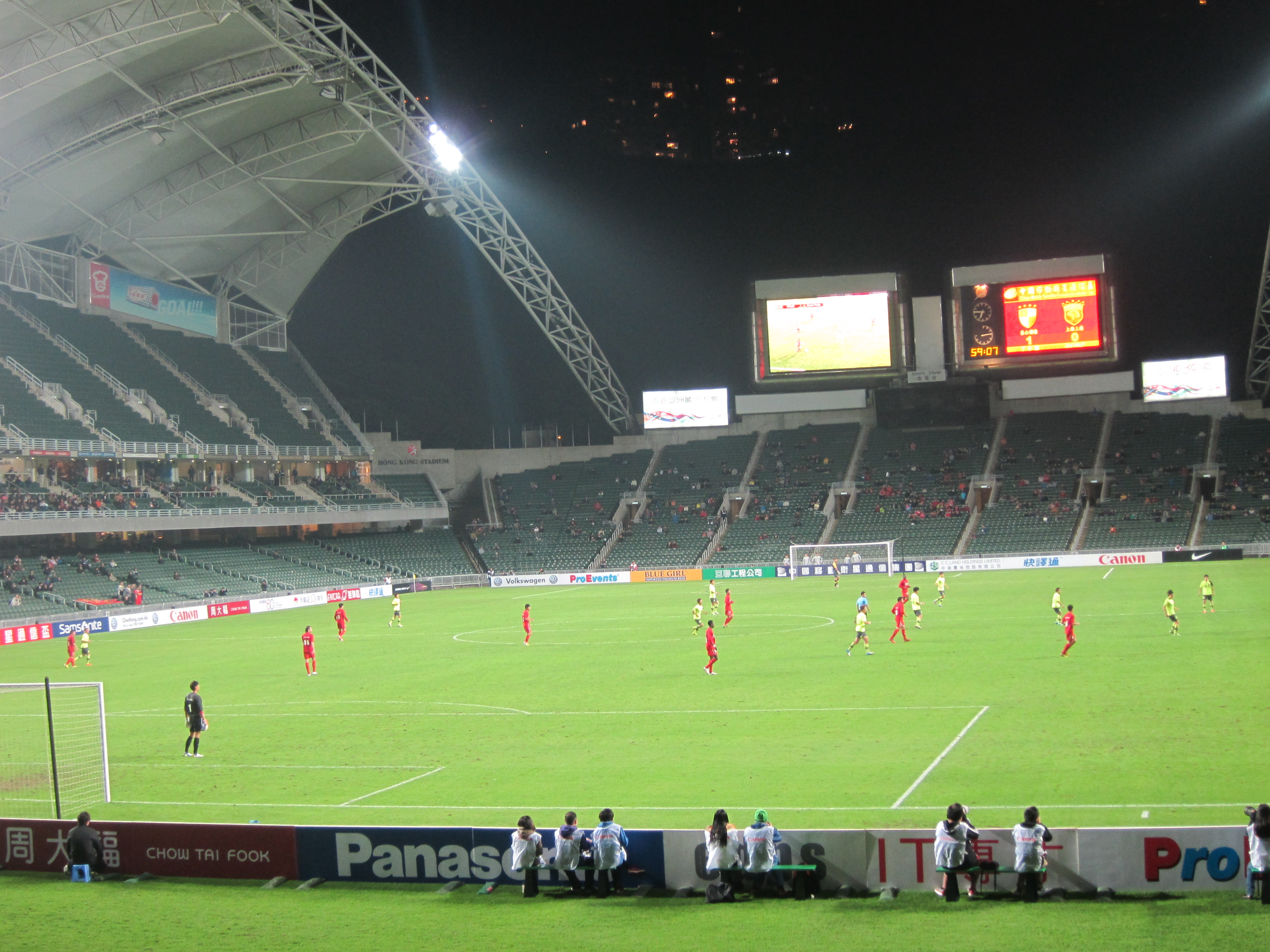
Final of 2013 Lunar New Year Cup Busan IPark vs Shanghai East Asia

== Teams ==
| Team | Country | League last season | Pos. |
|---|---|---|---|
| Hong Kong League XI | Hong Kong | — | — |
| Shanghai East Asia | China | League One | 1st |
| Muangthong United F.C. | Thailand | Thai Premier League | 1st |
| Busan IPark | South Korea | K League Classic | 7th |

== Public Vote of Hong Kong League XI Team ==
Each First Division League team had nominated at most 4 defenders, 3 midfielders and 3 forwards for the public vote of Hong Kong League XI Team. 10 players with the highest number of vote from different position were selected to the team, while 2 goalkeepers and 6 other players were chosen by the head coach of the team, Josep Gombau.

10 players with the highest voting in each position of the public vote are as follows:

| Position | Players | Position | Players |
|---|---|---|---|
| Left Defender | (Hong Kong) Deng Jinghuang (Sun Pegasus) | Right Defender | (Hong Kong) Chak Ting Fung (South China) |
| Left Defender | Ballot: 4775 | Right Defender | Ballot: 4595 |
| Center Defender (1) | (Brazil) Joel Bertoti Padilha (South China) | Center Defender (2) | (Brazil) Hélio José de Souza Gonçalves (Citizen) |
| Center Defender (1) | Ballot: 4536 | Center Defender (2) | Ballot: 4240 |
| Defensive Midfielder | (Brazil) Aender Naves Mesquita (Wofoo Tai Po) | Attacking Midfielder (1) | (Brazil) Itaparica (South China) |
| Defensive Midfielder | Ballot: 4209 | Attacking Midfielder (1) | Ballot: 6857 |
| Attacking Midfielder (2) | (Croatia) Miroslav Saric (Biu Chun Rangers) | Forward (1) | (Japan) Tsuyoshi Yoshitake (Yokohama FC Hong Kong) |
| Attacking Midfielder (2) | Ballot: 5056 | Forward (1) | Ballot: 5508 |
| Forward (2) | (Brazil) Giovane Alves da Silva (Biu Chun Rangers) | Forward (3) | (Nigeria) Alex Tayo Akande (Wofoo Tai Po) |
| Forward (2) | Ballot: 4544 | Forward (3) | Ballot: 4345 |

== Squads ==
=== Hong Kong League XI ===
Honorary Team Manager: (Hong Kong) Brian Leung
Deputy Honorary Team Manager: (Macau) Steven Lo, (Hong Kong) Pui Kwan Kay, (Hong Kong) Ken Ng
Coach: (Spain) Josep Gombau (Kitchee)
^{CS}Coach selection, ^{PS}Public selection
*Deng Jinghuang(Sun Pegaus) resigned due to injury.

| No. | Pos. | Player | Date of birth (age) | Caps | Club |
|---|---|---|---|---|---|
| 1 | GK | (Hong Kong) Wang Zhenpeng^{CS} | 5 May 1984 (aged 28) | | (Hong Kong) Kitchee |
| 2 | DF | (Ghana) Wisdom Fofo Agbo^{CS} | 25 June 1979 (aged 33) | | (Hong Kong) Southern |
| 3 | DF | (Spain) Dani Cancela^{CS} | 23 September 1981 (aged 31) | | (Hong Kong) Kitchee |
| 5 | DF | (Brazil) Joel Bertoti Padilha^{PS} | 24 July 1980 (aged 32) | | (Hong Kong) South China |
| 6 | MF | (Spain) Jose Maria Diaz Munoz^{CS} | 4 July 1982 (aged 30) | | (Hong Kong) Sunray Cave JC Sun Hei |
| 7 | MF | (Nigeria) Festus Baise^{CS} | 11 April 1980 (aged 32) | | (Hong Kong) Citizen |
| 8 | FW | (Nigeria) Alex Tayo Akande^{PS} | 9 February 1989 (aged 24) | | (Hong Kong) Wofoo Tai Po |
| 9 | MF | (Spain) Yago González López^{CS} | 6 November 1979 (aged 33) | | (Hong Kong) Kitchee |
| 10 | MF | (Brazil) Aender Naves Mesquita^{PS} | 12 February 1983 (aged 29) | | (Hong Kong) Wofoo Tai Po |
| 11 | MF | (Brazil) Itaparica^{PS} (Captain) | 8 July 1980 (aged 32) | | (Hong Kong) South China |
| 12 | MF | (Croatia) Miroslav Saric^{PS} | 7 February 1986 (aged 27) | | (Hong Kong) Biu Chun Rangers |
| 16 | DF | (Hong Kong) Chak Ting Fung^{PS} | 27 November 1989 (aged 23) | | (Hong Kong) South China |
| 18 | FW | (Japan) Tsuyoshi Yoshitake^{PS} | 8 September 1981 (aged 31) | | Yokohama FC Hong Kong |
| 19 | GK | (Hong Kong) Leung Hing Kit^{CS} | 22 October 1989 (aged 23) | | (Hong Kong) Biu Chun Rangers |
| 22 | FW | (Brazil) Giovane Alves da Silva^{PS} | 25 November 1982 (aged 30) | | (Hong Kong) Biu Chun Rangers |
| 23 | DF | (Brazil) Hélio José de Souza Gonçalves^{PS} | 31 January 1986 (aged 27) | | (Hong Kong) Citizen |
| 30 | FW | (Brazil) Detinho^{CS} | 11 September 1973 (aged 39) | | (Hong Kong) Citizen |

=== Shanghai East Asia ===
General coach: (China) Xu Genbao
Head coach: (China) Jiang Bingyao

| No. | Pos. | Player | Date of birth (age) | Caps | Club |
|---|---|---|---|---|---|
| 1 | GK | (China) Yan Junling | 28 January 1991 (aged 22) | | (China) Shanghai East Asia F.C. |
| 2 | DF | (China) Li Yunqiu | 23 October 1990 (aged 22) | | (China) Shanghai East Asia F.C. |
| 3 | DF | (China) Wu Yuyin | 8 January 1990 (aged 23) | | (China) Shanghai East Asia F.C. |
| 4 | DF | (China) Wang Shenchao (Captain) | 8 February 1989 (aged 24) | | (China) Shanghai East Asia F.C. |
| 5 | DF | (China) Wang Jiajie | 15 November 1988 (aged 24) | | (China) Shanghai East Asia F.C. |
| 6 | MF | (China) Cai Huikang | 10 October 1989 (aged 23) | | (China) Shanghai East Asia F.C. |
| 7 | FW | (China) Wu Lei | 19 November 1991 (aged 21) | | (China) Shanghai East Asia F.C. |
| 8 | MF | (China) Zheng Dalun | 11 February 1994 (aged 18) | | (China) Shanghai East Asia F.C. |
| 10 | DF | (Spain) Ibán Cuadrado | 21 February 1979 (aged 33) | | (China) Shanghai East Asia F.C. |
| 11 | FW | (Ghana) Chris Dickson | 28 December 1984 (aged 28) | | (China) Shanghai East Asia F.C. |
| 12 | FW | (China) Lü Wenjun | 11 March 1989 (aged 23) | | (China) Shanghai East Asia F.C. |
| 13 | FW | (China) Zhu Zhengrong | 11 October 1988 (aged 24) | | (China) Shanghai East Asia F.C. |
| 18 | DF | (China) Sun Kai | 6 March 1991 (aged 21) | | (China) Shanghai East Asia F.C. |
| 20 | FW | (China) Mao Jiakang | 17 January 1991 (aged 22) | | (China) Shanghai East Asia F.C. |
| 22 | GK | (China) Sun Le | 17 September 1989 (aged 23) | | (China) Shanghai East Asia F.C. |
| 23 | DF | (China) Bai Jiajun | 20 March 1991 (aged 21) | | (China) Shanghai East Asia F.C. |
| 25 | DF | (Ghana) Ransford Addo | 21 July 1983 (aged 29) | | (China) Shanghai East Asia F.C. |

=== Muangthong United ===
Manager: (Serbia) Slaviša Jokanović

| No. | Pos. | Player | Date of birth (age) | Caps | Club |
|---|---|---|---|---|---|
| 1 | GK | (Thailand) Umarin Yaodam | 22 January 1980 (aged 33) | | (Thailand) Muangthong United F.C. |
| 2 | DF | (Thailand) Artit Daosawang | 11 November 1992 (aged 20) | | (Thailand) Muangthong United F.C. |
| 4 | DF | (Thailand) Panupong Wongsa | 23 November 1983 (aged 29) | | (Thailand) Muangthong United F.C. |
| 5 | DF | (North Korea) Ri Kwang-chon | 4 September 1985 (aged 27) | | (Thailand) Muangthong United F.C. |
| 6 | DF | (Thailand) Thritthi Nonsrichai | 13 March 1983 (aged 29) | | (Thailand) Muangthong United F.C. |
| 7 | MF | (Thailand) Datsakorn Thonglao (Captain) | 30 December 1983 (aged 29) | | (Thailand) Muangthong United F.C. |
| 8 | MF | (North Korea) Pak Nam-chol | 2 July 1985 (aged 27) | | (Thailand) Muangthong United F.C. |
| 10 | FW | (Thailand) Teerasil Dangda | 6 June 1988 (aged 24) | | (Thailand) Muangthong United F.C. |
| 11 | MF | (Netherlands) Adnan Barakat | 3 September 1982 (aged 30) | | (Thailand) Muangthong United F.C. |
| 14 | MF | (Thailand) Siwakorn Jakkuprasat | 23 April 1992 (aged 20) | | (Thailand) Muangthong United F.C. |
| 16 | MF | (Thailand) Jakkraphan Pornsai | 28 March 1987 (aged 25) | | (Thailand) Muangthong United F.C. |
| 18 | DF | (Thailand) Mongkol Namnuad | 16 September 1985 (aged 27) | | (Thailand) Muangthong United F.C. |
| 19 | MF | (Thailand) Pichitphong Choeichiu | 28 August 1982 (aged 30) | | (Thailand) Muangthong United F.C. |
| 20 | MF | (North Macedonia) Mario Gjurovski | 11 December 1985 (aged 27) | | (Thailand) Muangthong United F.C. |
| 21 | MF | (Ivory Coast) Siaka Dagno | 1 November 1987 (aged 25) | | (Thailand) Muangthong United F.C. |
| 25 | DF | (Thailand) Thitipan Puangchan | 1 September 1993 (aged 19) | | (Thailand) Muangthong United F.C. |
| 26 | GK | (Thailand) Kawin Thamsatchanan | 26 January 1990 (aged 23) | | (Thailand) Muangthong United F.C. |
| 29 | FW | (Thailand) Napat Thamrongsupakorn | 16 November 1987 (aged 25) | | (Thailand) Muangthong United F.C. |
| 33 | FW | (Austria) Roland Linz | 9 August 1981 (aged 31) | | (Thailand) Muangthong United F.C. |
| 40 | DF | (South Korea) Kim Yoo-jin | 19 June 1983 (aged 29) | | (Thailand) Muangthong United F.C. |

=== Busan IPark ===
Manager: (South Korea) Yoon Sung-Hyo

| No. | Pos. | Player | Date of birth (age) | Caps | Club |
|---|---|---|---|---|---|
| 1 | GK | (South Korea) Lee Beom-young | 2 April 1989 (aged 23) | | (South Korea) Busan IPark |
| 2 | DF | (South Korea) Park Joon-kang | | | (South Korea) Busan IPark |
| 5 | DF | (South Korea) Hwang Jae-hun | 10 March 1986 (aged 26) | | (South Korea) Busan IPark |
| 6 | DF | (South Korea) Lee Kyung-ryul | 16 January 1988 (aged 25) | | (South Korea) Busan IPark |
| 7 | MF | (Brazil) William Fernando da Silva | 20 November 1986 (aged 26) | | (South Korea) Busan IPark |
| 9 | FW | (South Korea) Bang Seung-hwan | 25 February 1983 (aged 29) | | (South Korea) Busan IPark |
| 11 | MF | (South Korea) Lim Sang-hyub | 8 July 1988 (aged 24) | | (South Korea) Busan IPark |
| 15 | MF | (South Korea) Jung Seok-hwa | 17 May 1991 (aged 21) | | (South Korea) Busan IPark |
| 17 | MF | (South Korea) Kim Ik-hyun | 30 April 1989 (aged 23) | | (South Korea) Busan IPark |
| 18 | DF | (South Korea) Park Yong-ho | 25 March 1981 (aged 31) | | (South Korea) Busan IPark |
| 20 | DF | (South Korea) Lee Jung-ho | 13 March 1981 (aged 31) | | (South Korea) Busan IPark |
| 21 | GK | (South Korea) Lee Chang-keun | 30 August 1993 (aged 19) | | (South Korea) Busan IPark |
| 22 | FW | (South Korea) Han Ji-ho | 15 December 1988 (aged 24) | | (South Korea) Busan IPark |
| 23 | DF | (South Korea) Kim Ung-jin | 9 March 1987 (aged 25) | | (South Korea) Busan IPark |
| 26 | FW | (South Korea) Lee Jung-ki | | | (South Korea) Busan IPark |
| 27 | DF | (South Korea) Yoo Ji-no | 6 November 1989 (aged 23) | | (South Korea) Busan IPark |
| 28 | MF | (South Korea) Lee Jong-won | 14 March 1989 (aged 23) | | (South Korea) Busan IPark |
| 31 | FW | (South Korea) Kim Do-hyung | | | (South Korea) Busan IPark |
| 33 | DF | (South Korea) Jang Hak-young | 24 August 1981 (aged 31) | | (South Korea) Busan IPark |
| 51 | MF | (Brazil) José Fágner Silva da Luz | 25 May 1988 (aged 24) | | (South Korea) Busan IPark |

== Fixtures and results ==
=== Semi-finals ===
27 January 2013
15:00 (UTC+08:00)

| Shanghai East Asia (China) | 4–1 | (Thailand) Muangthong United F.C. |
|---|---|---|
| Lü Wenjun 3'; Wu Lei 45'; Dickson 55'; Wang Jiajie 76' | Report | Choeichiu (yellow card) 6'; Linz 31'; Dangda (yellow card) 43'; Yaodam (red card) 49'; Nonsrichai (yellow card) 68'; Jakkuprasat (yellow card) 90' |

Hong Kong Stadium
Attendance: 5,419
Referee: Tong Kui Sum (Hong Kong)
27 January 2013
17:30 (UTC+08:00)

| Hong Kong League XI | 1–3 | (South Korea) Busan IPark |
|---|---|---|
| Joel (yellow card) 30'; Aender 72' | Report | Lee Jung-ki 5'; Han Ji-ho 24'; Lim Sang-hyub 78' (yellow card) 90'; Jang Hak-young (yellow card) 90' |

Hong Kong Stadium
Attendance: 5,419
Referee: Ng Chiu Kok (Hong Kong)

=== Third place match ===
30 January 2013
15:00 (UTC+08:00)

| Hong Kong League XI | 1–0 | (Thailand) Muangthong United F.C. |
|---|---|---|
| Thonglao 15' (o.g.); Alex (yellow card) 30'; Hélio (yellow card) 90' | Report | Jakkuprasat (yellow card) 14'; Wongsa (yellow card) 33'; Gjurovski (yellow card) 59'; Choeichiu (yellow card) 80' |

Hong Kong Stadium
Attendance: 5,482
Referee: Ng Kai Lam (Hong Kong)

=== Final ===
30 January 2013
17:30 (UTC+08:00)

| Busan IPark (South Korea) | 1–0 | (China) Shanghai East Asia |
|---|---|---|
| Fágner 37'; Jung Seok-Hwa (yellow card) 68' | Report | Sun Kai (yellow card) 27'; Wang Jiajie (yellow card) 32'; Wu Lei (yellow card) 76' |

Hong Kong Stadium
Attendance: 5,482
Referee: Liu Kwok Man (Hong Kong)
