= Houston Dynamo in international competition =

This is a list of competitions played by Houston Dynamo involving international clubs, from 2006 (when the San Jose Earthquakes players and coaches were relocated to Houston) to the most recent completed season.

By virtue of their MLS Cup victories, the Dynamo have entered prestigious competitions like the CONCACAF Champions Cup and the North American SuperLiga. During the 2008 season, the Dynamo participated in the friendly Pan-Pacific Championship, held in Honolulu, Hawaii as well as in the inaugural CONCACAF Champions League competition.

Their best result in international competitions is being runner up of the 2008 SuperLiga. The Dynamo's best results in Concacaf were runs to the semifinals of the 2007 and 2008 Champions Cup. They also made the quarterfinals of the Champions League on 3 occasions.

== CONCACAF Champions Cup/ Champions League ==
Season	Round	Opponent	Home	Away	Aggregate
2007	Quarterfinals	(Costa Rica) Puntarenas F.C.	2-0	0-1	2-1
2007	Semi Finals	(Mexico) C.F. Pachuca	2-0	2-5	4-5
2008	Quarterfinals	(Guatemala) Municipal	3-1	0-0	3-1
2008	Semi Finals	(Costa Rica) Deportivo Saprissa	0-0	0-3	0-3
2008-09 ^{†}	Group Stage	(El Salvador) CD Luis Angel Firpo	1-0	1-1	2nd
2008-09 ^{†}	Group Stage	(Panama) San Francisco	2-1	0-0	2nd
2008-09 ^{†}	Group Stage	(Mexico) UNAM Pumas	1-3	4-4	2nd
2008-09 ^{†}	Quarterfinals	(Mexico) Atlante F.C	1-1	0-3	1-4
2009-10 ^{†}	Group Stage	(El Salvador) Isidro Metapan	1-0	2-3	3rd
2009-10 ^{†}	Group Stage	(Panama) Arabe Unido	5-1	1-1	3rd
2009-10 ^{†}	Group Stage	(Mexico) C.F. Pachuca	0-1	0-2	3rd
2012-13 ^{†}	Group Stage	(Honduras) Olimpia	1-1	1-1	1st
2012-13 ^{†}	Group Stage	(El Salvador) FAS	4-0	3-1	1st
2012-13 ^{†}	Quarterfinals	(Mexico) Santos Laguna	1-0	0-3	1-3
2013-14 ^{†}	Group Stage	(Panama) Arabe Unido	2-1	0-1	2nd
2013-14 ^{†}	Group Stage	(Trinidad and Tobago) W Connection	2-0	0-0	2nd
2019 ^{†}	Round of 16	(Guatemala) CD Guastatoya	2-1	1-0	3-1
2019 ^{†}	Quarterfinals	(Mexico) Tigres UANL	0-2	0-1	0-3
2024	Round One	(United States) St. Louis City SC	1-0	1-2	2-2 (a)
2024	Round of 16	(United States) Columbus Crew	0-1	1-1	1-2

Notes: † Concacaf Champions League era

== Leagues Cup ==
Year	Round	Opponent	Result
2019	Quarterfinals	(Mexico) Club America	1(5) - 1(6) PSO
2023	Group Stage	(United States) Orlando City SC	1(4) - 1(5) † PSO
2023	Group Stage	(Mexico) Santos Laguna	2(5) - 2(4) † PSO
2023	Round of 32	(Mexico) C.F Pachuca	0(5) - 0(3) PSO
2023	Round of 16	(United States) Charlotte FC	1 - 2
2024	Group Stage	(Mexico) Atlas	0-1
2024	Group Stage	(United States) Real Salt Lake	3-0
2024	Round of 32	(Mexico) Toluca	

Notes: † Group stage matches that end in a draw go to penalty shoot outs where the winner gets 1 extra point

== North American Superliga ==
Season	Round	Opponent	Result
2007	Group Stage	(Mexico) Club America	1-0
2007	Group Stage	(Mexico) Monarcas Morelia	1-1
2007	Group Stage	(United States) D.C. United	1-0
2007	Semifinals	(Mexico) C.F Pachuca	2(3) - 2(4) PSO
2008	Group Stage	(Mexico) Atlante F.C.	4-0
2008	Group Stage	(Mexico) CD Guadalajara	0-1
2008	Group Stage	(United States) D.C. United	3-1
2008	Semifinals	(Mexico) C.F. Pachuca	2-0
2008	Final	(United States) New England Revolution	2(5) - 2(6) PSO
2010	Group Stage	(Mexico) C.F. Pachuca	2-1
2010	Group Stage	(United States) Chivas USA	1-1
2010	Group Stage	(Mexico) Puebla F.C.	1-0
2010	Semifinals	(Mexico) Monarcas Morelia	0-1

== Friendly Tournaments ==
- Pan-Pacific Championship 2008
  - Semifinals v. (Australia) Sydney FC - 3:0
  - Final v. (Japan) Gamba Osaka - 1:6
