= 2009 Pan-Pacific Championship =

Tournament details
- Host country: United States
- Dates: February 18–21
- Teams: 4 (from 2 confederations)
- Venue: 1 (in 1 host city)

Final positions
- Champions: (South Korea) Suwon Bluewings (1st title)
- Runners-up: (United States) Los Angeles Galaxy
- Third place: (Japan) Oita Trinita

Tournament statistics
- Matches played: 4
- Goals scored: 8 (2 per match)

The 2009 Pan-Pacific Championship was the second edition of the Pan-Pacific Championship. It was held in February 2009 at The Home Depot Center in Carson, California, United States and featured the champions from the Chinese Super League and K-League, J. League Cup winners, and the hosts, Los Angeles Galaxy of Major League Soccer.

The Galaxy faced the Japanese representative, Oita Trinita, in the semi-final stage for the second successive year after facing Gamba Osaka in the 2008 competition, and this time they won the match. In the other semi-final, Korean side Suwon Samsung Bluewings beat Shandong Luneng Taishan of China.

Oita Trinita beat Shandong Luneng 2–1 to finish third in the tournament and Suwon Bluewings won the trophy after a 4–2 penalty shootout win over the Galaxy.

== Teams ==
- (United States) Los Angeles Galaxy (host)
- (Japan) Oita Trinita (2008 J. League Cup winners)
- (China) Shandong Luneng Taishan (2008 Chinese Super League champions)
- (South Korea) Suwon Samsung Bluewings (2008 K-League & 2008 Hauzen Cup champions)

== Bracket ==
Semi-finals
February 18 – Carson
(United States) Los Angeles Galaxy	2
(Japan) Oita Trinita	0
February 18 – Carson
(South Korea) Suwon Bluewings	1
(China) Shandong Luneng	0

Final
February 21 – Carson
(United States) Los Angeles Galaxy	1(2)
(South Korea) Suwon Bluewings	1(4)
Third place
February 21 – Carson
(Japan) Oita Trinita	2
(China) Shandong Luneng	1

== Semifinals ==
February 18
17:30 UTC-8

Suwon Bluewings (South Korea)	1 – 0	(China) Shandong Luneng
Cho 81'	Report

The Home Depot Center, Carson, California
Referee: Baldomero Toledo (United States)

February 18
20:00 UTC-8

Los Angeles Galaxy (United States)	2 – 0	(Japan) Oita Trinita
Buddle 44'; Kirovski 53' (pen.)	Report

The Home Depot Center, Carson, California

== Third-place match ==
February 21
17:30 UTC-8

Oita Trinita (Japan)	2 – 1	(China) Shandong Luneng
Takamatsu 28'; Ueslei 42'	Report	Mrdaković 45' (pen.)

The Home Depot Center, Carson, California

== Final ==
February 21
20:00 UTC-8

Los Angeles Galaxy (United States)	1 – 1	(South Korea) Suwon Bluewings
Magee 89' (pen.)	Report	Franklin 39' (o.g.)
Penalties
Buddle (penalty missed); Klein (penalty scored); Magee (penalty scored); Patterson (penalty missed)	2 – 4	(penalty scored) Edu; (penalty scored) Yang; (penalty scored) Lee; (penalty scored) Choi

The Home Depot Center, Carson, California

2009 Pan-Pacific Championship
winners

Suwon Samsung Bluewings
1st title

== Scorers ==
Rank	Name	Club	Goals
1	(United States) Edson Buddle	(United States) Los Angeles Galaxy	1
1	(South Korea) Cho Yong-Tae	(South Korea) Suwon Samsung Bluewings	1
1	(United States) Jovan Kirovski	(United States) Los Angeles Galaxy	1
1	(United States) Mike Magee	(United States) Los Angeles Galaxy	1
1	(Serbia) Miljan Mrdaković	(China) Shandong Luneng	1
1	(Japan) Daiki Takamatsu	(Japan) Oita Trinita	1
1	(Brazil) Ueslei	(Japan) Oita Trinita	1
Own	(United States) Sean Franklin	(United States) Los Angeles Galaxy (for Suwon)	1

== Sponsors ==
The following is a list of the official sponsors of the Pan-Pacific Championship 2009.

- Yamazaki-Nabisco
- Japan Airlines
- Sports DEPO

== See also ==
2012 Hawaiian Islands Invitational
