= Hawaiian Islands Invitational =

- Founded: 2011
- Region: CONCACAF and AFC
- Teams: 4
- Current champions: (South Korea) Busan IPark (1st title)
- Most championships: (South Korea) Busan IPark (1)
- 2012 Hawaiian Islands Invitational

The Hawaiian Islands Invitational was an inter-confederation association football competition held in the state of Hawaii, United States, founded in 2011. The tournament consisted of four teams, who contested a knockout style competition that spanned three days.

== History ==
When the Pan-Pacific Championship stopped being played, due to turf issues at the Aloha Stadium, moves were put in place to attempt to reconstruct an inter-confederation, end of season tournament that would see some of the best teams from North American, Asia, and Australia go head to head. In March 2011, it was announced that the Hawaiian Islands Invitational would be set up, by ESPN Regional Television, Inc. in co-operation with the Hawai’i Tourism Authority and Major League Soccer.

Like the inaugural Pan-Pacific Championship held in 2008, the tournament will be held at Aloha Stadium in the city of Honolulu, and will be broadcast live on ESPN and its subsidiary stations.

== Editions ==
The 2012 tournament was held from February 23 to 25 of that year. The four participating teams belong to the same confederations that competed in the defunct Pan-Pacific Championship, CONCACAF and AFC, and are as follows:

- (United States) Colorado Rapids – Major League Soccer
- (Japan) Yokohama FC – J. League Division 2
- (South Korea) Busan IPark – K-League
- (Australia) Melbourne Heart – A-League

Year	Final			Third-place match		
Year	Winner	Score	Runner-up	3rd place	Score	4th place
2012	(South Korea) Busan IPark	3–0	(Japan) Yokohama FC	(United States) Colorado Rapids	1–0	(Australia) Melbourne Heart

== See also ==
- Sydney Festival of Football
