= Kim Tae-jun =

South Korean footballer (born 1989)

Kim Tae-Jun
Personal information
- Full name: Kim Tae-Jun
- Date of birth: 25 April 1989 (age 37)
- Place of birth: South Korea
- Height: 1.73 m (5 ft 8 in)
- Position: Midfielder

Team information
- Current team: Goyang Hi FC
- Number: 11

Youth career
- 2009: Ryutsu Keizai University

Senior career*
| Years | Team | Apps | (Gls) |
| 2010 | Chungju Hummell | 2 | (0) |
| 2011–2012 | Busan IPark | 1 | (0) |
| 2013 | Goyang Hi FC | 5 | (0) |
| 2014-2015 | Gimpo FC | | |
| 2016 | Pocheon Citizen FC | | |
| 2016-2019 | Gangneung Citizen FC | | |
- * Club domestic league appearances and goals as of 17 December 2013

Kim Tae-Jun (Korean: 김태준; born 25 April 1989) is a South Korean footballer who plays as midfielder for Goyang Hi FC in K League Challenge.

== Career ==
He was selected by Busan IPark in the 2011 K-League draft. He made his K-League debut in the league match against Jeju United on 26 June 2012.

He moved to Goyang Hi FC before the 2013 season started.
