= Umarin Yaodam =

Thai footballer (born 1980)

Personal information
- Full name: Umarin Yaodam
- Date of birth: 22 January 1980 (age 46)
- Place of birth: Songkhla, Thailand
- Height: 1.82 m (5 ft 11 1/2 in)
- Position: Goalkeeper

Youth career
- 2001: Sinthana

Senior career*
Years	Team	Apps	(Gls)
2002–2004	Sinthana	45	(0)
2005–2010	Buriram PEA	122	(0)
2011–2012	Wuachon United	29	(0)
2012–2013	Muangthong United	5	(0)
2013	→ Air Force AVIA (loan)	10	(0)
2014–2015	Suphanburi	8	(0)
2016–2017	Kasetsart	2	(0)
Total		221	(0)

International career
2001	Thailand U23		
2006	Thailand	1	(0)
Medal record
Thailand under-23
Sea Games
Gold medal – first place	Sea Games 2001	Football
- * Club domestic league appearances and goals as of 23 June 2008

Umarin Yaodam (Thai: อัมรินทร์ เยาว์ดำ, born 22 January 1980) is a Thai former professional footballer who played as a goalkeeper.

== International career ==
Umarin was called up to the national team, in coach Peter Reid's first squad selection for the T&T Cup, to be played in Vietnam in October 2008.

=== International ===
As of 27 March 2016

National team	Year	Apps	Goals
Thailand	2006	1	0
Thailand	Totall	1	0

== Honours ==
=== Club ===
Buriram PEA

- Thai Premier League (1): 2008

Buriram

- Thai Division 1 League (1): 2011

Muangthong United

- Thai Premier League (1): 2012

=== International ===
Thailand U-23

- Sea Games Gold Medal (1); 2001
