= Kim Hyung-pil =

South Korean footballer

Kim Hyung-Pil
Personal information
- Full name: Kim Hyung-Pil
- Date of birth: 13 January 1987 (age 39)
- Place of birth: South Korea
- Height: 1.75 m (5 ft 9 in)
- Position: Forward

Team information
- Current team: Gyeongnam FC

Youth career
- Gwangyang Jecheol High School
- Kyung Hee University

Senior career*
| Years | Team | Apps | (Gls) |
| 2010–2011 | Chunnam Dragons | 13 | (3) |
| 2012–2013 | Busan I'Park | 1 | (0) |
| 2013 | → Cheongju Jikji (loan) | 19 | (27) |
| 2014–2015 | Hwaseong FC | | |
| 2015 | Gyeongju KH&NP | 15 | (8) |
| 2016– | Gyeongnam FC | | |
- * Club domestic league appearances and goals as of 3 March 2013

- Kim Hyung-pil
- Hangul: 김형필
- Hanja: 金炯必
- RR: Gim Hyeongpil
- MR: Kim Hyŏngp'il

Kim Hyung-Pil (Korean: 김형필; born 13 January 1987) is a South Korean footballer who plays for Gyeongnam FC in the K League Challenge.
