= Éder Baiano =

Brazilian footballer

Personal information
- Full name: Eder Luís de Carvalho
- Date of birth: 14 May 1984 (age 42)
- Place of birth: Araçatuba, Brazil
- Height: 1.87 m (6 ft 1 1/2 in)
- Position: Defender

Senior career*
Years	Team	Apps	(Gls)
2002–2011	Rio Preto		
2008	→ Ituano (loan)		
2009	→ Guarani (loan)	3	(0)
2009–2010	→ Olhanense (loan)	7	(0)
2011	→ Linense (loan)	1	(1)
2011–2012	Busan IPark	52	(1)
2013	Changchun Yatai	24	(0)
2015	Rio Preto		
- * Club domestic league appearances and goals as of 4 November 2013

Eder Luís de Carvalho, better known as Éder Baiano (born 14 May 1984), is a Brazilian retired footballer who played as a defender.
