= Yoo Ji-hoon =

South Korean footballer (born 1988)

Personal information
- Full name: Yoo Ji-hoon
- Date of birth: 9 June 1988 (age 38)
- Place of birth: Namyangju, South Korea
- Height: 1.73 m (5 ft 8 in)
- Position: Defender

Team information
- Current team: Gyeongnam FC
- Number: 3

Youth career
- 2007–2009: Hanyang University

Senior career*
Years	Team	Apps	(Gls)
2010	Gyeongnam FC	2	(0)
2011–2017	Busan IPark	90	(2)
2013–2014	→ Sangju Sangmu (army)	23	(1)
2017–2018	Seoul E-Land	22	(0)
2018–	Gyeongnam FC	13	(0)
- * Club domestic league appearances and goals as of 5 January 2020

Yoo Ji-hoon (Korean: 유지훈; born 9 June 1988) is a South Korean footballer who plays as a defender for Gyeongnam FC.

== Club career statistics ==
As of 13 July 2017

Club performance			League		Cup		Play-offs		Total	
Season	Club	League	Apps	Goals	Apps	Goals	Apps	Goals	Apps	Goals
South Korea			League		KFA Cup		Play-offs		Total	
2010	Gyeongnam FC	K-League	2	0	0	0	—	—	2	0
2011	Busan IPark	K-League	5	0	0	0	—	—	5	0
2012	Busan IPark	K-League	30	1	0	0	—		30	1
2013	Sangju Sangmu	KL Challenge	5	0	0	0	—	—	5	0
2014	Sangju Sangmu	KL Classic	18	1	1	0	—	—	19	1
2014	Busan IPark	KL Classic	9	0	0	0	—	—	9	0
2015	Busan IPark	KL Classic	23	1	1	0	2	0	26	1
2016	Busan IPark	KL Challenge	14	0	2	0	0	0	16	0
2017	Busan IPark	KL Challenge	9	0	1	0	0	0	10	0
Career total			115	3	5	0	2	0	122	3
