= Choi Kwang-hee =

South Korean footballer (born 1984)

Personal information
- Date of birth: May 17, 1984 (age 42)
- Place of birth: South Korea
- Height: 1.72 m (5 ft 8 in)
- Position: Midfielder

Youth career
- University of Ulsan

Senior career*
Years	Team	Apps	(Gls)
2006	Ulsan Hyundai	3	(0)
2007	Jeonbuk Hyundai Motors	2	(0)
2008–	Busan IPark	122	(4)
2013–2014	→ Police FC (army)	53	(2)
- * Club domestic league appearances and goals as of 4 December 2017

- Choi Kwang-hee
- Hangul: 최광희
- Hanja: 崔光熙
- RR: Choe Gwanghui
- MR: Ch'oe Kwanghŭi

Choi Kwang-hee (born May 17, 1984) is a South Korea football player who plays for Busan IPark as a right winger, wing back or full back.
