= Yoon Dong-min =

South Korean footballer (born 1988)

Personal information
- Full name: Yoon Dong-min
- Date of birth: July 24, 1988 (age 38)
- Place of birth: South Korea
- Height: 1.76 m (5 ft 9 1/2 in)
- Position: Striker

Team information
- Current team: Jeonnam Dragons
- Number: 30

Youth career
- 2007–2010: Kyung Hee University

Senior career*
Years	Team	Apps	(Gls)
2010	FC Seoul	0	(0)
2011–2017	Busan IPark	68	(5)
2016–2017	→ Sangju Sangmu (army)	18	(2)
2018–	Jeonnam Dragons	13	(0)
- * Club domestic league appearances and goals as of 26 November 2019

Yoon Dong-min (Korean: 윤동민) is a South Korean football player, who currently plays for Jeonnam Dragons.

== Club career ==
Yoon joined FC Seoul as a draft pick from Kyunghee University. But he failed to make any appearance in Seoul. He joined Busan I'Park in 2011. His first appearance for his new club was as a late substitute in Busan's away loss to Ulsan Hyundai FC in the K-League Cup, and Yoon followed this with his first league match against Seongnam Ilhwa Chunma on 3 April 2011, in which he again featured as a late match substitute. Yoon scored his first professional goal in Busan's win over Cheonan City FC in the club's first match of the 2011 Korean FA Cup.

== Club career statistics ==
As of 4 December 2017

Club performance			League		Cup		League Cup		Play-offs		Total	
Season	Club	League	Apps	Goals	Apps	Goals	Apps	Goals	Apps	Goals	Apps	Goals
South Korea			League		KFA Cup		League Cup		Play-offs		Total	
2010	FC Seoul	K League 1	0	0	0	0	0	0	-	-	0	0
2011	Busan I'Park	K League 1	12	1	2	1	5	1	-	-	19	3
2012	Busan I'Park	K League 1	22	4	5	1	-		-	-	27	5
2013	Busan I'Park	K League 1	13	0	2	0	-		-	-	15	0
2014	Busan I'Park	K League 1	2	0	0	0	-	-	-	-	2	0
2015	Busan I'Park	K League 1	16	0	1	0	-	-	1	0	18	0
2016	Sangju Sangmu	K League 1	6	1	0	0	-	-	0	0	6	1
2017	Sangju Sangmu	K League 1	12	1	2	0	-	-	0	0	14	1
2017	Busan IPark	K League 2	3	0	1	0	-	-	0	0	4	0
Career total			86	7	13	2	5	1	1	0	105	10
