= Lee Chang-geun =

South Korean footballer

- Lee in 2026

Personal information
- Date of birth: 30 August 1993 (age 33)
- Place of birth: Busan, South Korea
- Height: 1.86 m (6 ft 1 in)
- Position: Goalkeeper

Team information
- Current team: Daejeon Hana Citizen
- Number: 1

Youth career
- 2009–2011: Busan IPark

Senior career*
Years	Team	Apps	(Gls)
2012–2016	Busan IPark	26	(0)
2016	Suwon FC	21	(0)
2017–2021	Jeju United	87	(0)
2020–2021	→ Gimcheon Sangmu (draft)	26	(0)
2022–	Daejeon Hana Citizen	145	(0)

International career^{‡}
2009	South Korea U17	1	(0)
2012–2013	South Korea U20	11	(0)
2015–2016	South Korea U23	6	(0)
2020–	South Korea	3	(0)
- * Club domestic league appearances and goals as of 16 May 2026 ‡ National team caps and goals as of 11 July 2025

Lee Chang-geun (Korean: 이창근; Hanja: 李昌根; born 30 August 1993) is a South Korean footballer who plays as a goalkeeper for Daejeon Hana Citizen and the South Korea national team.

== Career statistics ==
=== Club ===
As of match played 16 May 2026

Appearances and goals by club, season and competition
Club	Season	League			Cup		Continental		Other		Total	
Club	Season	Division	Apps	Goals	Apps	Goals	Apps	Goals	Apps	Goals	Apps	Goals
Busan IPark	2012	K League 1	0	0	0	0	—		—		0	0
Busan IPark	2013	K League 1	5	0	1	0	—		—		6	0
Busan IPark	2014	K League 1	7	0	0	0	—		—		7	0
Busan IPark	2015	K League 1	11	0	0	0	—		—		11	0
Busan IPark	2016	K League 2	3	0	0	0	—		—		3	0
Busan IPark	Total		26	0	1	0	—		—		27	0
Suwon FC	2016	K League 1	21	0	0	0	—		—		21	0
Jeju United	2017	K League 1	19	0	1	0	3 (Note: Appearances in AFC Champions League)	0	—		23	0
Jeju United	2018	K League 1	35	0	2	0	5	0	—		42	0
Jeju United	2019	K League 1	23	0	1	0	—		—		24	0
Jeju United	2021	K League 1	10	0	0	0	—		—		10	0
Jeju United	Total		87	0	4	0	8	0	—		99	0
Gimcheon Sangmu (draft)	2020	K League 1	18	0	0	0	—		—		18	0
Gimcheon Sangmu (draft)	2021	K League 2	8	0	0	0	—		—		8	0
Gimcheon Sangmu (draft)	Total		26	0	0	0	—		—		26	0
Daejeon Hana Citizen	2022	K League 2	30	0	0	0	—		2 (Note: Appearances in K League promotion-relegation play-offs)	0	32	0
Daejeon Hana Citizen	2023	K League 1	38	0	0	0	—		—		38	0
Daejeon Hana Citizen	2024	K League 1	35	0	1	0	—		—		36	0
Daejeon Hana Citizen	2025	K League 1	27	0	2	0	—		—		29	0
Daejeon Hana Citizen	2026	K League 1	15	0	0	0	—		1 (Note: Appearance in K League Super Cup)	0	16	0
Daejeon Hana Citizen	Total		145	0	3	0	—		3	0	151	0
Career total			305	0	8	0	8	0	3	0	324	0

=== International ===
As of match played 11 July 2025

Appearances and goals by national team and year
National team	Year	Apps	Goals
South Korea	2020	1	0
South Korea	2024	1	0
South Korea	2025	1	0
Career total		3	0

== Honours ==
Gimcheon Sangmu

- K League 2: 2021

South Korea U-20

- AFC U-19 Championship: 2012

South Korea U-23

- King's Cup: 2015
