= Lee Kyung-ryul =

South Korean footballer (born 1988)

Personal information
- Full name: Lee Kyung-ryul
- Date of birth: 16 January 1988 (age 38)
- Place of birth: Gyeongju, South Korea
- Height: 1.86 m (6 ft 1 in)
- Position: Defender

Team information
- Current team: Seoul E-Land
- Number: 15

Youth career
- 2006–2008: Korea University

Senior career*
Years	Team	Apps	(Gls)
2010–2011	Gyeongnam FC	25	(2)
2012–2017	Busan IPark	129	(7)
2016–2017	→ Sangju Sangmu (army)	19	(1)
2018	Jeonnam Dragons	4	(1)
2019–	Seoul E-Land	0	(0)
- * Club domestic league appearances and goals as of 31 December 2018

- Lee Kyung-ryul
- Hangul: 이경렬
- Hanja: 李京烈
- RR: I Gyeongryeol
- MR: I Kyŏngnyŏl

Lee Kyung-ryul (Korean: 이경렬; born 16 January 1988) is a South Korean footballer who plays as a defender for Seoul E-Land.

== Club career statistics ==
As of 3 December 2017

Club performance			League		Cup		League Cup		Play-offs		Total	
Season	Club	League	Apps	Goals	Apps	Goals	Apps	Goals	Apps	Goals	Apps	Goals
South Korea			League		KFA Cup		League Cup		Play-offs		Total	
2010	Gyeongnam FC	K League 1	5	0	0	0	1	0	—	—	6	0
2011	Gyeongnam FC	K League 1	20	2	1	0	6	0	—	—	27	2
2012	Busan IPark	K League 1	39	1	1	0	—		—	—	40	1
2013	Busan IPark	K League 1	22	0	2	0	—	—	—	—	24	0
2014	Busan IPark	K League 1	30	2	2	0	—	—	—	—	32	2
2015	Busan IPark	K League 1	34	3	1	0	—	—	2	0	37	3
2016	Sangju Sangmu	K League 1	8	1	0	0	—	—	0	0	8	1
2017	Sangju Sangmu	K League 1	11	0	0	0	—	—	0	0	11	0
2017	Busan IPark	K League 2	4	1	0	0	—		1	0	5	1
Career total			173	10	7	0	7	0	3	0	190	10
