= Pan-Pacific Championship =

- Founded: 2007
- Region: Asia, North America, and Oceania
- Teams: 4
- Current champions: (South Korea) Suwon Bluewings (1st title)
- Most championships: (Japan) Gamba Osaka, (South Korea) Suwon Bluewings (1 time)
- Website: Official website
- 2009 Pan-Pacific Championship

The Pan-Pacific Football Championship was an inter-confederation football tournament between teams from A-League (Australia and New Zealand), Chinese Super League (China), J. League (Japan), K-League (Korea), and Major League Soccer (United States and Canada). The event was underwritten by MLS and promoted through its Soccer United Marketing arm.

== History ==
The inaugural edition of the competition took place from February 20 to February 23, 2008 in Honolulu, Hawaii. Four teams took part in the competition.

Houston Dynamo qualified as MLS Cup champions, and Gamba Osaka qualified as champions of the Japanese League Cup. Australia's A-League was represented by the loser of the minor semi final instead of the champion team. This was due to a scheduling conflict with the A-League Preliminary Final on February 17, followed by the Grand Final on February 24, which were moved back so as not to interfere with Australia's 2010 FIFA World Cup qualification campaign. The fourth competitor was originally intended to be the SuperLiga champion, Pachuca, but the club reportedly declined to take part and their place in the competition was awarded to Los Angeles Galaxy.

Teams from China and Korea made their debut in the tournament in the 2009 edition, which was held at the Galaxy's The Home Depot Center in Carson, California.

While no official statement has been issued, the tournament was not held in 2010 or 2011. In 2012, Aloha Stadium is scheduled to host the Hawaiian Islands Invitational, a preseason tournament that will also feature teams from Japan, Australia, the United States, and South Korea. A similar tournament, the Pacific Rim Cup, will be held in Honolulu in February 2018, featuring MLS and J League teams.

== Results ==
Year	Host	Final			Third-place match		
Year	Host	Winner	Score	Runner-up	3rd place	Score	4th place
2008	United States	(Japan) Gamba Osaka	6–1	(United States) Houston Dynamo	(United States) Los Angeles Galaxy	2–1	(Australia) Sydney FC
2009	United States	(South Korea) Suwon Bluewings	1–1 (4–2p)	(United States) Los Angeles Galaxy	(Japan) Oita Trinita	2–1	(China) Shandong Luneng

== Statistics ==
=== By club ===
Team	Won	Runner-up	Years won	Years runner-up
(Japan) Gamba Osaka	1	0	2008	
(South Korea) Suwon Samsung Bluewings	1	0	2009	
(United States) Los Angeles Galaxy	0	1		2009
(United States) Houston Dynamo	0	1		2008

=== By nation ===
Nation	Times won	Times runner-up	Winning clubs	Runners-up
Japan	1	0	Gamba Osaka (1)	
South Korea	1	0	Suwon Samsung Bluewings (1)	
United States	0	2		Houston Dynamo (1), Los Angeles Galaxy (1)

== See also ==
- Hawaiian Islands Invitational
