= Lee Jong-won (footballer) =

South Korean footballer

Lee Jong-Won
Personal information
- Full name: Lee Jong-Won
- Date of birth: March 14, 1989 (age 37)
- Place of birth: South Korea
- Height: 1.76 m (5 ft 9 1/2 in)
- Position: Attacking midfielder

Team information
- Current team: Suwon FC
- Number: 8

Youth career
- 2007—2010: Sungkyunkwan University

Senior career*
Years	Team	Apps	(Gls)
2011—2012	Busan IPark	49	(2)
2013–2018	Seongnam FC	91	(4)
2017–2018	→ Sangju Sangmu (army)	18	(0)
2019–	Suwon FC	10	(0)

International career
2012–	South Korea U-23		
- * Club domestic league appearances and goals as of 29 November 2019

Lee Jong-Won (Korean: 이종원; born 14 March 1989) is a South Korean football player who plays for Suwon FC as a midfielder.

== Club career ==
Choo joined Busan I'Park as a draft pick from Sungkyunkwan University for the 2011 K-League season. Lee made his first start for Busan against Gangwon FC in the fourth round of the 2011 K-League Cup, playing the full 90 minutes. In the following round of the Cup, against the Chunnam Dragons, Lee scored the only goal of the match which ensured a win for Busan. His K-League debut was on 15 May 2011, as a late substitute in a match against Incheon United.

== Club career statistics ==
As of 4 December 2017

Club performance			League		Cup		League Cup		Total	
Season	Club	League	Apps	Goals	Apps	Goals	Apps	Goals	Apps	Goals
South Korea			League		KFA Cup		League Cup		Total	
2011	Busan I'Park	K League 1	1	0	1	0	3	1	5	1
2012	Busan I'Park	K League 1	37	2	3	1	-		40	3
2013	Busan I'Park	K League 1	11	0	0	0	-		11	0
2013	Seongnam Ilhwa Chunma	K League 1	13	4	0	0	-		13	4
2014	Seongnam Ilhwa Chunma	K League 1	22	0	0	0	-		22	0
2015	Seongnam Ilhwa Chunma	K League 1	21	0	0	0	-		21	0
2016	Seongnam Ilhwa Chunma	K League 1	25	0	0	0	-		25	0
2017	Seongnam Ilhwa Chunma	K League 1	15	0	0	0	-		15	0
Career total			145	6	4	1	3	1	152	8
