= Fágner (footballer, born 1988) =

Brazilian footballer

Personal information
- Full name: José Fágner Silva da Luz
- Date of birth: May 25, 1988 (age 38)
- Place of birth: Agrestina-PE, Brazil
- Height: 1.63 m (5 ft 4 in)
- Positions: Striker; attacking midfielder

Team information
- Current team: Mirassol

Youth career
- 2004–2006: Sport

Senior career*
Years	Team	Apps	(Gls)
2007	Sport		
2008–2009	Ypiranga		
2010–2011	Salgueiro	7	(2)
2011	¤ Busan I'Park (loan)	11	(6)
2012–2014	Busan IPark	90	(20)
2014	Ponte Preta	4	(0)
2015	Salgueiro	9	(0)
2016–	Mirassol	15	(1)
2017	¤ Rio Preto (loan)	11	(3)
- * Club domestic league appearances and goals as of 18 November 2016

José Fágner Silva da Luz or simply Fágner, born May 25, 1988, in Agrestina-PE, is a Brazilian footballer who plays as an attacking midfielder. Fagner is a skilful and versatile forward who can play in a number of positions in attack.

In July 2011 Fagner joined South Korean K-League team Busan IPark on loan from Campeonato Brasileiro Série B side Salgueiro Atlético Clube, making a name for himself scoring twice in the league game against Suwon Samsung Bluewings on 23 July 2011. Later in the season he signed a permanent deal at Busan. In the 2013 K-League season Fagner scored ten goals in all competitions, making him IPark's joint top scorer for the season. The following year was Fagner's most prolific with the club; he scored thirteen goals in total, including ten in the league. He was named in the league's 'Best Eleven' on five occasions.

== Club career statistics ==
As of 30 November 2014

Club performance			League		Cup		League Cup		Total	
Season	Club	League	Apps	Goals	Apps	Goals	Apps	Goals	Apps	Goals
South Korea			League		KFA Cup		League Cup		Total	
2011	Busan IPark	K-League	11	6	0	0	0	0	11	6
2012	Busan IPark	K-League	25	2	0	0	-		25	2
2013	Busan IPark	KL Classic	31	8	3	2	-	-	34	10
2014	Busan IPark	KL Classic	34	10	3	3	-	-	37	13
Career total			101	26	6	5	0	0	107	31
