= Han Ji-ho =

South Korean footballer (born 1988)

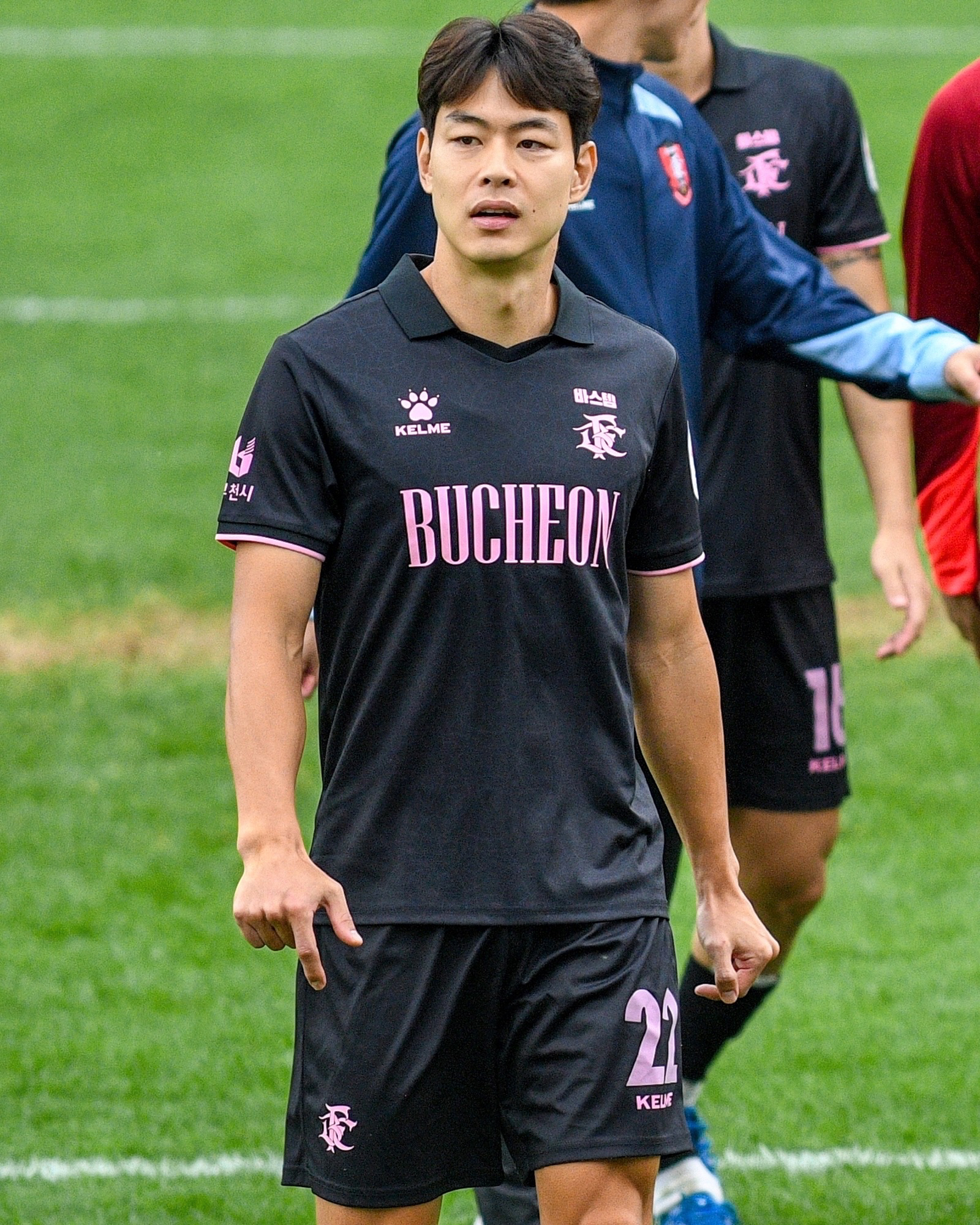
- Han in 2024

Personal information
- Date of birth: December 15, 1988 (age 37)
- Place of birth: South Korea
- Height: 1.79 m (5 ft 10 1/2 in)
- Positions: Midfielder; forward

Team information
- Current team: Bucheon FC 1995
- Number: 22

Youth career
- Hongik University

Senior career*
Years	Team	Apps	(Gls)
2010–2020	Busan IPark	220	(24)
2016–2017	→ Ansan Mugunghwa (army)	58	(11)
2020	→ Gyeongnam FC (loan)	11	(1)
2021–	Bucheon FC 1995	128	(14)
- * Club domestic league appearances and goals as of 4 August 2026

Han Ji-Ho (born December 15, 1988) is a South Korean football player who plays for Bucheon FC 1995 as a forward or winger.

== Club career ==
Han Ji-ho joined Busan IPark at the start of the 2010 K League season. He made his debut on 4 September 2010 as a substitute in a 1-1 draw with Incheon United, and his first start came the following month on 3 October in a 2-1 defeat to Daegu FC. Han scored his first goal for the club on 16 July 2011 in a 2-1 win over Sangju Sangmu.

After six years with Busan, Han joined Asan Mugunghwa in the K League 2 to complete his mandatory military service in 2016. In his first year with the military side, Han scored a career-best of ten league goals. At the completion of his service, Han returned to Busan for the final stages of the 2017 K League 2 season.

In 2019, Han was named by coach Cho Deok-je as the club captain. He was replaced as captain by veteran defender Kang Min-soo for the 2020 season.

== Club career statistics ==
As of 8 November 2020

Club performance			League		Cup		League Cup		Play-offs		Total	
Season	Club	League	Apps	Goals	Apps	Goals	Apps	Goals	Apps	Goals	Apps	Goals
South Korea			League		KFA Cup		League Cup				Total	
2010	Busan	K League 1	9	0	1	1	0	0	-	-	10	1
2011	Busan	K League 1	27	2	0	0	5	2	-	-	32	4
2012	Busan	K League 1	44	6	0	0	-	-	-	-	44	6
2013	Busan	K League 1	28	5	1	0	-	-	-	-	29	5
2014	Busan	K League 1	22	0	3	0	-	-	-	-	25	0
2015	Busan	K League 1	20	2	1	0	-	-	1	0	22	2
2016	Ansan	K League 2	38	10	1	0	-	-	0	0	39	10
2017	Ansan	K League 2	20	1	0	0	-	-	0	0	20	1
2017	Busan	K League 2	5	1	2	0	-	-	2	0	9	1
2018	Busan	K League 2	30	4	3	0	-	-	2	0	35	4
2019	Busan	K League 2	32	4	1	0	-	-	1	0	34	4
2020	Busan	K League 1	3	0	0	0	-	-	0	0	3	0
2020	Gyeongnam	K League 2	11	1	0	0	-	-	0	0	11	1
Career total			289	36	13	1	5	2	6	0	313	39
