= Bang Seung-hwan =

South Korean footballer (born 1983)

Bang Seung-Hwan
Personal information
- Date of birth: February 25, 1983 (age 43)
- Place of birth: South Korea
- Height: 1.84 m (6 ft 0 in)
- Positions: Center back; defensive midfielder

Youth career
- Dongguk University

Senior career*
Years	Team	Apps	(Gls)
2004–2008	Incheon United	85	(9)
2009	Jeju United	23	(5)
2010–2011	FC Seoul	33	(4)
2012–2013	Busan IPark	47	(5)
2013	→ Muangthong United (loan)	11	(1)
2014	→ UiTM F.C. (loan)	10	(4)
2014	Air Force Central	15	(5)
2015–2016	Kedah FA	51	(8)
2017–2018	Navy	25	(0)
- * Club domestic league appearances and goals as of October 30, 2017 ‡ National team caps and goals as of January 24, 2017

- Bang Seung-hwan
- Hangul: 방승환
- Hanja: 方承奐
- RR: Bang Seunghwan
- MR: Pang Sŭnghwan

Bang Seung-Hwan (Korean: 방승환; born 25 February 1983) is a South Korean football player. He is a versatile player who can play both center back, defensive midfielder and striker based on his physical capability and football sense.

He played both positions many times in K-league classic. His debut as a centerback was the match vs Al Ayn in 2011 AFC Champions league. He got appointed as the candidate of 2011 AFC Champions league Best 11. And he played as centerback in FC Seoul which was the champion in K-league Classic. He played as centerback and striker both from that time until July 2013.

He plays for Kedah FA in 2015 Malaysia Premier League season and 2015 Malaysia Cup. He became a partner with Khairul Helmi Johari in the defence line. He helped Kedah FA to win Malaysia Premier League cup 2015 and qualified for Malaysia Super League 2016. He was very popular among the fans. 2017 is the successful year for him and Kedah team after they finished 3rd place on the Malaysia Super League, Semi Finalist Malaysia FA Cup and won Malaysia Cup 2016 after managed pay their revenged of the Final Malaysia Cup 2015 by beating Selangor FA with penalty spot after held 1–1 in 120 minutes.

== Club career statistics ==
Club performance			League		Cup		League Cup		Continental		Total	
Season	Club	League	Apps	Goals	Apps	Goals	Apps	Goals	Apps	Goals	Apps	Goals
South Korea			League		KFA Cup		League Cup		Asia		Total	
2004	Incheon United	K League Classic	13	1	0	0	12	3	-		25	4
2005	Incheon United	K League Classic	22	5	2	0	9	0	-		33	5
2006	Incheon United	K League Classic	18	0	3	0	12	3	-		33	3
2007	Incheon United	K League Classic	19	2	4	2	9	4	-		32	8
2008	Incheon United	K League Classic	13	1	0	0	0	0	-		13	1
2009	Jeju United	K League Classic	23	5	3	1	4	0	-		30	6
2010	FC Seoul	K League Classic	17	2	2	0	4	2	-		23	4
2011	FC Seoul	K League Classic	16	2	2	0	0	0	4	1	22	3
2012	Busan IPark	K League Classic	33	5	1	0	-		-		34	5
2013	Busan IPark	K League Classic	14	0	1	1	-		-		15	1
Thailand			League		FA Cup		League Cup		Asia		Total	
2013	Muangthong United	TPL	6	1	3	1	2	1			11	3
Total	South Korea		188	23	18	4	50	12	4	1	260	40
Total	Thailand		6	1	3	1	2	1			11	3
Total	Career total		194	24	21	5	52	13	4	1	271	43

== Honours ==
=== Club ===
Incheon United

- K-League Runner-up : 2005

FC Seoul

- K-League Cup Winner : 2010

Kedah

- Malaysia Premier League Winner : 2015
- Malaysia Cup Runner Up : 2015
- Malaysia Super League 3rd : 2016
- Malaysia Cup : 2016
