= 2008 Pan-Pacific Championship =

Tournament details
- Host country: United States
- Dates: February 20 – February 23
- Teams: 4 (from 2 confederations)
- Venue: 1 (in 1 host city)

Final positions
- Champions: (Japan) Gamba Osaka (1st title)

Tournament statistics
- Matches played: 4
- Goals scored: 14 (3.5 per match)
- Attendance: 76,430 (19,108 per match)
- Top scorer: (Brazil) Baré (5 Goals)
- Best player: (Brazil) Baré

The 2008 Pan-Pacific Championship is the inaugural edition of the Pan-Pacific Championship association football competition which took place on February 20 and February 23 at the Aloha Stadium in Honolulu, Hawaii, United States featuring teams from Japan's J. League, United States Major League Soccer (MLS) and the A-League of Australia and New Zealand.

For the 2008 tournament, the A-League was not represented by the champion team but instead by the loser of the minor semi-final. This is due to a scheduling conflict with the Grand Final on February 24, which was moved back so as not to interfere with Australia's 2010 FIFA World Cup qualification campaign.

The 2008 tournament also features Gamba Osaka of the J. League, which were the 2007 J. League Cup champion, and Major League Soccer representatives Houston Dynamo and Los Angeles Galaxy, the latter reportedly chosen instead of the desired 2007 SuperLiga champion, as Pachuca declined and Galaxy were the Superliga runner-up. The Galaxy's first game was versus Gamba Osaka. while the Dynamo were drawn against Sydney FC.

== Bracket ==
Semi-finals
February 20 – Honolulu
(Japan) Gamba Osaka	1
(United States) Los Angeles Galaxy	0
February 20 – Honolulu
(United States) Houston Dynamo	3
(Australia) Sydney FC	0

Final
February 23 – Honolulu
(Japan) Gamba Osaka	6
(United States) Houston Dynamo	1
Third place
February 23 – Honolulu
(United States) Los Angeles Galaxy	2
(Australia) Sydney FC	1

== Semifinals ==
February 20
18:00 HST

Gamba Osaka (Japan)	1–0	(United States) Los Angeles Galaxy
Baré 3'	(report)

Aloha Stadium, Honolulu, Hawaii
Attendance: 15,128
Referee: Baldomero Toledo

February 20
20:30 HST

Houston Dynamo (United States)	3–0	(Australia) Sydney FC
De Rosario 28'; Holden 29'; Wondolowski 43'	(report)

Aloha Stadium, Honolulu, Hawaii
Attendance: 15,128
Referee: Alex Prus

== Third-place match ==
February 23
18:00 HST

Los Angeles Galaxy (United States)	2–1	(Australia) Sydney FC
Allen 3'; Tudela 45'	(report)	Renaud 42'

Aloha Stadium, Honolulu, Hawaii
Attendance: 23,087
Referee: Brian Hall

== Final ==
February 23
20:30 HST

Gamba Osaka (Japan)	6–1	(United States) Houston Dynamo
Baré 13', 25', 59', 71'; Lucas 62'; Yamazaki 77'	(report)	Clark 10'

Aloha Stadium, Honolulu, Hawaii
Attendance: 23,087
Referee: Kevin Stott

2008 Pan-Pacific Championship
winners

Gamba Osaka
1st title

== Top scorers ==
Rank	Player	Club	Goals
1	(Brazil) Baré	(Japan) Gamba Osaka	5
2	(United States) Ely Allen	(United States) Los Angeles Galaxy	1
2	(United States) Ricardo Clark	(United States) Houston Dynamo	1
2	(Canada) Dwayne De Rosario	(United States) Houston Dynamo	1
2	(United States) Stuart Holden	(United States) Houston Dynamo	1
2	(Australia) Brendan Renaud	(Australia) Sydney FC	1
2	(Brazil) Lucas Severino	(Japan) Gamba Osaka	1
2	(United States) Josh Tudela	(United States) Los Angeles Galaxy	1
2	(United States) Chris Wondolowski	(United States) Houston Dynamo	1
2	(Japan) Masato Yamazaki	(Japan) Gamba Osaka	1

== Sponsors ==
The following is a list of the official sponsors of the Pan-Pacific Championship 2008.

- MLJ
- Hilton Hawaiian Village Beach Resort & Spa on Waikiki Beach
- Onkyo
- The Honolulu Advertiser
- Japan Airlines
- Yamazaki-Nabisco
- Active Hawaii
- Johnson & Johnson
