= 2007 FC Seoul season =

FC Seoul
2007 season
- Chairman: Huh Chang-soo
- Manager: Şenol Güneş
- K-League: 7th
- FA Cup: Quarter-finals
- League Cup: Runners-up
- Top goalscorer: League: Lee Sang-hup (5); All: Lee Sang-hup, Dudu (6)
- Highest home attendance: 55,397 vs Suwon (League, 8 April)
- Lowest home attendance: 5,950 vs Daejeon (League Cup, 16 May)
- Average home league attendance: 21,515
Home colours	Away colours

== Competitions ==
=== Overview ===
Competition	Starting round	Final position	Record							
Competition	Starting round	Final position	Pld	W	D	L	GF	GA	GD	Win %
K League	Matchday 1	Matchday 38					—			
FA Cup	Round of 32						—			
League Cup	Group stage						—			
Total			0	0	0	0	0	0	+0	—

Last updated: 31 December 2007
Source: Fixtures and Results at FC Seoul Official Website

== Match reports and match highlights ==
Fixtures and Results at FC Seoul Official Website (in English)

== Season statistics ==
=== K League records ===
Season	Teams	Final Position	League Position	Pld	W	D	L	GF	GA	GD	Pts	Manager
2007	14	7th	7th	26	8	13	5	23	16	+7	37	(Turkey) Şenol Güneş

=== All competitions records ===
Seasoan	Teams	K-League	Championship	League Cup	FA Cup	AFC Champions League	Manager
2007	14	7th	Did not qualify	Runners-up	Quarter-finals	Did not qualify	(Turkey) Şenol Güneş

=== Attendance records ===
Season	Season Total Att.	K League Total Att.	Regular season Average Att.	League Cup Average Att.	FA Cup Total / Average Att.	ACL Total / Average Att.	Friendly Match Att.	Att. Ranking	Notes
2007	411,362	379,903	21,515	14,315	31,459 / 31,459	N/A	65,000 (Manchester United)	K League Season; Total Att. 2nd	

- Season total attendance is K League Regular Season, League Cup, FA Cup, AFC Champions League in the aggregate and friendly match attendance is not included.
- K League season total attendance is K League Regular Season and League Cup in the aggregate.

== Squad statistics ==
=== Goals ===
Pos	K League	League Cup	FA Cup	AFC Champions League	Total	Notes
1	(South Korea) Lee Sang-Hup (5)	(South Korea) Kim Eun-Jung (4)	(South Korea) Kim Eun-Jung (1) (South Korea) Kim Chi-Gon (1)	Did not qualify	(South Korea) Lee Sang-Hup (6) (Brazil) Dudu (6)	
2	(Brazil) Dudu (3)	(South Korea) Park Chu-Young (3)	N/A	Did not qualify	N/A	
3	(South Korea) Lee Chung-Yong (3)	(Brazil) Dudu (3)	No scorer	Did not qualify	(South Korea) Park Chu-Young (5) (South Korea) Jung Jo-Gook (5)	
4	(South Korea) Park Chu-Young (2)	(South Korea) Jung Jo-Gook (3)	No scorer	Did not qualify	N/A	
5	(South Korea) Jung Jo-Gook (2)	(South Korea) Sim Woo-Yeon (2)	No scorer	Did not qualify	(South Korea) Kim Eun-Jung (5)	

=== Assists ===
Pos	K League	League Cup	Total	Notes
1	(Portugal) Ricardo (2)	(South Korea) Lee Chung-Yong (5)	(South Korea) Lee Chung-Yong (6)	
2	(South Korea) Lee Eul-Yong (2)	(South Korea) Kim Dong-Suk (2)	(Portugal) Ricardo (3)	
3	(South Korea) Kim Eun-Jung (1)	(Portugal) Ricardo (1)	(South Korea) Kim Eun-Jung (2)	
4	(South Korea) Koh Myong-Jin (1)	(South Korea) Lee Min-Sung (1)	(South Korea) Lee Sang-Hup (2)	
5	(South Korea) Jung Jo-Gook (1)	(South Korea) Lee Sang-Hup (1)	(South Korea) Kim Dong-Suk (2)	

== Coaching staff ==
Position	Name	Notes
Manager	(Turkey) Şenol Güneş	
Assistant manager	(South Korea) Lee Young-jin	
First-team coach	(Turkey) Seref Çiçek	
First-team coach	(South Korea) Choi Yong-Soo	
Reserve Team Manager	(South Korea) Kim Sung-Nam	
Reserve Team Coach	(South Korea) Kim Yong-Kab	
Goalkeeping coach	(Turkey) Yasin Özdenak	
Fitness coach	Unknown	
U-18 Team Manager	(South Korea) Choi Jin-Han	
U-18 Team Coach	(South Korea) Lee Young-Ik	
U-18 Team Coach	(South Korea) Lee Won-Jun	
Technical director & Chief Scout	(South Korea) Choi Gi-Bong	

== Players ==
=== Team squad ===
All players registered for the 2007 season are listed.

Note: Flags indicate national team as defined under FIFA eligibility rules; some limited exceptions apply. Players may hold more than one non-FIFA nationality.

No.	Pos.	Nation	Player
1	GK	KOR	Kim Byung-Ji
2	DF	KOR	Kwak Tae-Hwi (Out)
3	MF	KOR	Ahn Tae-Eun
4	DF	KOR	Park Yong-Ho
5	DF	KOR	Park Jung-Suk
6	DF	KOR	Lee Min-Sung
7	MF	KOR	Lee Eul-Yong (captain)
8	DF	BRA	Adilson dos Santos
9	FW	KOR	Jung Jo-Gook
10	FW	KOR	Park Chu-Young
11	FW	BRA	Dudu
13	MF	KOR	Kim Tae-Jin
14	DF	KOR	Kim Han-Yoon
15	MF	KOR	Kim Dong-Suk
16	MF	KOR	Koh Myong-Jin
17	DF	KOR	Lee Jung-Youl
18	FW	KOR	Kim Eun-Jung
19	DF	KOR	Choi Jae-Soo (Conscripted)
20	DF	KOR	Park Yo-Seb
21	MF	KOR	Choi Won-Kwon
22	DF	KOR	Kim Chi-Gon (Vice-captain)
23	DF	KOR	Jung Kwang-Min (Out)

No.	Pos.	Nation	Player
24	FW	KOR	Ahn Sang-Hyun
25	MF	KOR	Yoon Hong-Chang
26	FW	KOR	Lee Sang-Hup
27	MF	KOR	Lee Chung-Yong
28	MF	KOR	Song Jin-Hyung
29	MF	KOR	Chun Je-Hun
31	GK	KOR	Kim Ho-Jun
32	MF	KOR	Go Yo-Han
33	MF	KOR	Bae Hae-Min
34	DF	KOR	Jung Sung-Ho
35	MF	KOR	Kang Myung-Chul (Conscripted)
36	DF	KOR	Lee Kwang-Hee
37	MF	KOR	Choi Young-Il (Conscripted)
38	MF	KOR	Lee Yoo-Seong
39	FW	KOR	Kim Ba-Woo
40	MF	KOR	Ki Sung-Yueng
41	GK	KOR	Sim Woo-Yeon
42	MF	KOR	Lee Hyun-Kyu (Conscripted)
50	MF	POR	Ricardo Nascimento
66	DF	KOR	Kim Jin-Kyu (In)
77	GK	KOR	Weon Jong-Teok

=== Out on loan & military service ===
Note: Flags indicate national team as defined under FIFA eligibility rules; some limited exceptions apply. Players may hold more than one non-FIFA nationality.

No.	Pos.	Nation	Player
—	MF	KOR	Lee Ji-Nam (to (South Korea) Police FC until November 2007 / Discharged)
—	FW	KOR	Jung Jae-Yoon (to (South Korea) Police FC until November 2007 / Discharged)
—	MF	KOR	Ku Kyung-Hyun (to (South Korea) Gwangju Sangmu until November 2007 / Discharged)
—	MF	KOR	Cho Sung-Yong (to (South Korea) Gwangju Sangmu until November 2007 / Discharged)
—	MF	KOR	Lee Ik-Sung (to (South Korea) Gwangju Sangmu until November 2007 / Discharged)

No.	Pos.	Nation	Player
—	GK	KOR	Park Dong-Suk (to (South Korea) Gwangju Sangmu until November 2008)
—	DF	KOR	Yeo Hyo-Jin (to (South Korea) Gwangju Sangmu until November 2008)
—	MF	KOR	Han Tae-You (to (South Korea) Gwangju Sangmu until November 2008)
—	FW	KOR	Kim Seung-Yong (to (South Korea) Gwangju Sangmu until November 2008)

- In : Transferred from other teams in the middle of season.
- Out : Transferred to other teams in the middle of season.
- Discharged : Transferred from Gwangju Sangmu and Police FC for military service after end of season. (Not registered in 2007 season.)
- Conscripted : Transferred to Gwangju Sangmu and Police FC for military service after end of season.

== Tactics ==
=== Starting eleven and formation ===
This section shows the most used players for each position considering a 4-4-2 formation.

No.	Pos.	Nat.	Name	MS	Notes
1	GK	(South Korea)	Kim Byung-Ji		
21	DF	(South Korea)	Choi Won-Kwon		
22	DF	(South Korea)	Kim Chi-Gon		
14	DF	(South Korea)	Kim Han-Yoon		
8	DF	(Brazil)	Adilson		
27	MF	(South Korea)	Lee Chung-Yong		
15	MF	(South Korea)	Kim Dong-Suk		
40	MF	(South Korea)	Ki Sung-Yueng		
7	MF	(South Korea)	Lee Eul-Yong		
26	FW	(South Korea)	Lee Sang-Hup		
11	FW	(Brazil)	Dudu		

Source: Squad stats and Start formations.
Only competitive matches.
Using the most used start formation.
Ordered by position on pitch (from back right to front left).

=== Substitutes ===
No.	Pos.	Nat.	Name	MS	Notes
77	GK	(South Korea)	Weon Jong-Teok		
17	DF	(South Korea)	Lee Jung-Youl		
28	MF	(South Korea)	Song Jin-Hyung		
9	FW	(South Korea)	Jung Jo-Gook		
10	FW	(South Korea)	Park Chu-Young		
18	FW	(South Korea)	Kim Eun-Jung		

Source: Squad stats and Start formations.
Only competitive matches.
Using the most used start formation.
Ordered by position on pitch (from back right to front left).

== See also ==
- FC Seoul
