= 2008 FC Seoul season =

FC Seoul
2008 season
- Chairman: Huh Chang-soo
- Manager: Şenol Güneş
- K-League: Runners-up
- FA Cup: Round of 32
- League Cup: 3rd, Group A
- Top goalscorer: League: Dejan (15); All: Dejan (15)
- Highest home attendance: 44,239 vs Suwon (League, 13 April)
- Lowest home attendance: 7,727 vs Gyeongnam (League Cup, 25 June)
- Average home league attendance: 22,417
Home colours	Away colours

The 2008 FC Seoul season lists the results of the South Korean association football team FC Seoul in the 2008 season.

== Competitions ==
=== Overview ===
Competition	Starting round	Final position	Record							
Competition	Starting round	Final position	Pld	W	D	L	GF	GA	GD	Win %
K League	Matchday 1	Matchday 38					—			
FA Cup	Round of 32						—			
League Cup	Group stage						—			
Total			0	0	0	0	0	0	+0	—

Last updated: 31 December 2008
Source: Fixtures and Results at FC Seoul Official Website

== Match reports and match highlights ==
Fixtures and Results at FC Seoul Official Website (in English)

== Season statistics ==
=== K League records ===
Season	Teams	Final Position	League Position	Pld	W	D	L	GF	GA	GD	Pts	Manager
2008	14	Runners-up	2nd	26	15	9	2	44	25	+19	54	(Turkey) Şenol Güneş

==== K League Championship records ====
Season	Teams	Position	Pld	W	D	L	GF	GA	GD	PSO	Manager
2008	6	Runners-up	3	1	1	1	6	5	+1	N/A	(Turkey) Şenol Güneş

=== All competitions records ===
Seasoan	Teams	K-League	Championship	League Cup	FA Cup	AFC Champions League	Manager
2008	14	Runners-up	Runners-up	Group A 3rd	Round of 32	Did not qualify	(Turkey) Şenol Güneş

=== Attendance records ===
Season	Season Total Att.	K League Total Att.	Regular season Average Att.	League Cup Average Att.	FA Cup Total / Average Att.	ACL Total / Average Att.	Friendly Match Att.	Att. Ranking	Notes
2008	398,757	398,757	22,417	12,499	No home match	N/A	34,000 (Los Angeles Galaxy); 40,000 (FC Tokyo)	K League Season; Total Att. 2nd	K League Championship included

- Season total attendance is K League Regular Season, League Cup, FA Cup, AFC Champions League in the aggregate and friendly match attendance is not included.
- K League season total attendance is K League Regular Season and League Cup in the aggregate.

== Squad statistics ==
=== Goals ===
Pos	K League	League Cup	FA Cup	AFC Champions League	Total	Notes
1	(Montenegro) Dejan (15)	(South Korea) Lee Seung-Yeoul (2)	(South Korea) Lee Jong-min (1)	Did not qulifay	(Montenegro) Dejan (15)	
2	(South Korea) Jung Jo-Gook (8)	(South Korea) Kim Chi-Woo (1)	No scorer	Did not qulifay	(South Korea) Jung Jo-Gook (9)	
3	(South Korea) Lee Chung-Yong (5)	(Turkey) Ceyhun (1)	No scorer	Did not qulifay	(South Korea) Lee Chung-Yong (6)	
4	(South Korea) Kim Eun-Jung (4)	(South Korea) Lee Chung-Yong (1)	No scorer	Did not qulifay	(South Korea) Kim Eun-Jung (5) (South Korea) Lee Seung-Yeoul (5)	
5	(South Korea) Ki Sung Yueng (4)	(South Korea) Lee Sang-Hup (1)	No scorer	Did not qulifay	N/A	

=== Assists ===
Pos	K League	League Cup	Total	Notes
1	(South Korea) Lee Chung-Yong (6)	(South Korea) Kim Eun-Jung (2)	(South Korea) Lee Chung-Yong (6)	
2	(Montenegro) Dejan (6)	(South Korea) Lee Sang-Hup (1)	(Montenegro) Dejan (6)	
3	(South Korea) Park Chu-Young (4)	(South Korea) Ki Sung-Yueng (1)	(South Korea) Jung Jo-Gook (5)	
4	(South Korea) Jung Jo-Gook (4)	(South Korea) Jung Jo-Gook (1)	(South Korea) Park Chu-Young (4)	
5	(South Korea) Choi Won-Kwon (3)	(South Korea) Lee Eul-Yong (1)	(South Korea) Kim Eun-Jung (4)	

== Coaching staff ==
Position	Name	Notes
Manager	(Turkey) Şenol Güneş	
Assistant manager	(South Korea) Lee Young-jin	
First-team coach	(Turkey) Seref Çiçek	
First-team coach	(South Korea) Choi Yong-Soo	
Reserve Team Manager	(South Korea) Kim Sung-Nam	
Reserve Team Coach	(South Korea) Kim Yong-Kab	
Goalkeeping coach	(Turkey) Yasin Özdenak	
Fitness coach	Unknown	
U-18 Team Manager	(South Korea) Choi Jin-Han	
U-18 Team Coach	(South Korea) Lee Young-Ik	
U-18 Team Coach	(South Korea) Lee Won-Jun	
Technical director & Chief Scout	(South Korea) Choi Gi-Bong	

== Players ==
=== Team squad ===
All players registered for the 2008 season are listed.

Note: Flags indicate national team as defined under FIFA eligibility rules; some limited exceptions apply. Players may hold more than one non-FIFA nationality.

No.	Pos.	Nation	Player
1	GK	KOR	Kim Byung-Ji
2	DF	KOR	Yoon Hong-Chang
3	DF	KOR	Ahn Tae-Eun
4	DF	KOR	Park Yong-Ho
5	MF	KOR	Park Yo-Seb
6	DF	KOR	Lee Min-Sung
7	MF	KOR	Lee Eul-Yong (captain)
8	DF	BRA	Adilson dos Santos
9	FW	KOR	Jung Jo-Gook
10	FW	KOR	Park Chu-Young (Out)
11	FW	MNE	Dejan Damjanović
13	FW	KOR	Ahn Sang-Hyun
14	DF	KOR	Kim Han-Yoon
15	MF	KOR	Kim Dong-Suk (In)
15	DF	KOR	Lee Jong-min (In)
16	MF	KOR	Ko Myong-Jin
17	DF	KOR	Ki Sung-Yueng
18	FW	KOR	Kim Eun-Jung
19	DF	KOR	Lee Sang-Hup
20	DF	KOR	Kim Jin-kyu
21	DF	KOR	Choi Won-Kwon (Conscripted)
22	DF	KOR	Kim Chi-Gon (Vice-captain)

No.	Pos.	Nation	Player
23	MF	KOR	Ku Kyung-Hyun
24	GK	KOR	Kim Ho-Jun
25	FW	KOR	Sim Woo-Yeon
26	MF	NED	Musampa (In & Out)
26	MF	KOR	Kim Chi-Woo (In)
27	MF	KOR	Lee Chung-Yong
28	MF	KOR	Bae Hae-Min
29	MF	KOR	Chun Je-Hun (Conscripted)
30	GK	KOR	Jo Su-Huk
31	GK	KOR	Kang Jae-Wook
32	MF	KOR	Go Yo-Han
33	DF	KOR	Lee Sang-Woo
34	DF	KOR	Jung Sung-Ho
35	MF	KOR	Moon Ki-Han
36	MF	KOR	Kim Hyun-Kwan
37	FW	KOR	Lee Seung-Yeoul
38	MF	KOR	Han Tae-You (Discharged)
39	DF	KOR	Yeo Hyo-Jin (Discharged)
41	GK	KOR	Park Dong-Suk (Discharged)
47	MF	KOR	Kim Seung-Yong (Discharged)
51	GK	KOR	Kwon Jung-Hyuk
77	MF	TUR	Ceyhun Eriş (In)

=== Out on loan & military service ===
Note: Flags indicate national team as defined under FIFA eligibility rules; some limited exceptions apply. Players may hold more than one non-FIFA nationality.

No.	Pos.	Nation	Player
—	FW	KOR	Bae Hae-min (to (Czech Republic) FK Viktoria Žižkov until July 2009)

No.	Pos.	Nation	Player
—	GK	KOR	Park Dong-Suk (to (South Korea) Gwangju Sangmu until November 2008 / Discharged)
—	DF	KOR	Yeo Hyo-Jin (to (South Korea) Gwangju Sangmu until November 2008 / Discharged)
—	MF	KOR	Han Tae-You (to (South Korea) Gwangju Sangmu until November 2008 / Discharged)
—	FW	KOR	Kim Seung-Yong (to (South Korea) Gwangju Sangmu until November 2008 / Discharged)
—	DF	KOR	Choi Jae-Soo (to (South Korea) Gwangju Sangmu until October 2009)
—	DF	KOR	Kang Myung-Chul (to (South Korea) Police FC until October 2009)
—	DF	KOR	Choi Young-Il (to (South Korea) Police FC until October 2009)

- In : Transferred from other teams in the middle of season.
- Out : Transferred to other teams in the middle of season.
- Discharged : Transferred from Gwangju Sangmu and Police FC for military service in the middle of season. (Registered in 2008 season)
- Conscripted : Transferred to Gwangju Sangmu and Police FC for military service afterend of season.

== Tactics ==
=== Starting eleven and formation ===
This section shows the most used players for each position considering a 4-4-2 formation.

No.	Pos.	Nat.	Name	MS	Notes
24	GK	(South Korea)	Kim Ho-Jun		
21	DF	(South Korea)	Choi Won-Kwon		
22	DF	(South Korea)	Kim Chi-Gon		
20	DF	(South Korea)	Kim Jin-kyu		
8	DF	(Brazil)	Adilson		
27	MF	(South Korea)	Lee Chung-Yong		
17	MF	(South Korea)	Ki Sung-Yueng		
7	MF	(South Korea)	Lee Eul-Yong		
37	MF	(South Korea)	Lee Seung-Yeoul		
9	FW	(South Korea)	Jung Jo-Gook		
11	FW	(Montenegro)	Dejan		

Source: Squad stats and Start formations.
Only competitive matches.
Using the most used start formation.
Ordered by position on pitch (from back right to front left).

=== Substitutes ===
No.	Pos.	Nat.	Name	MS	Notes
30	GK	(South Korea)	Jo Su-Huk		
4	DF	(South Korea)	Park Yong-Ho		
16	MF	(South Korea)	Ko Myong-Jin		
10	FW	(South Korea)	Park Chu-Young		
18	FW	(South Korea)	Kim Eun-Jung		
19	FW	(South Korea)	Lee Sang-Hup		

Source: Squad stats and Start formations.
Only competitive matches.
Using the most used start formation.
Ordered by position on pitch (from back right to front left).

== See also ==
- FC Seoul
