= 2006 FC Seoul season =

FC Seoul
2006 season
- Chairman: Huh Chang-soo
- Manager: Lee Jang-soo
- K-League: 4th
- FA Cup: Quarter-finals
- League Cup: Winners
- Top goalscorer: League: Kim Eun-jung (9); All: Kim Eun-jung (15)
- Highest home attendance: 41,237 vs Busan (League, 5 May)
- Lowest home attendance: 4,573 vs Jeju (League Cup, 27 May)
- Average home league attendance: 18,782
Home colours	Away colours

== Competitions ==
=== Overview ===
Competition	Starting round	Final position	Record							
Competition	Starting round	Final position	Pld	W	D	L	GF	GA	GD	Win %
K League	Matchday 1	Matchday 38					—			
FA Cup	Round of 32						—			
League Cup	Group stage						—			
Total			0	0	0	0	0	0	+0	—

Last updated: 31 December 2005
Source: Fixtures and Results at FC Seoul Official Website

== Match reports and match highlights ==
Fixtures and Results at FC Seoul Official Website (in English)

== Season statistics ==
=== K League records ===
Season	Teams	Final Position	League Position	Pld	W	D	L	GF	GA	GD	Pts	Manager
2006	14	4th	4th	26	9	12	5	31	22	+9	39	(South Korea) Lee Jang-Soo

- 2006 season's league position was decided by aggregate points,
  because this season had first stage and second stage.
- K-League Championship results are not counted

==== K League Championship records ====
Season	Teams	Position	Pld	W	D	L	GF	GA	GD	PSO	Manager
2006	4	4th (Semi-final)	1	0	0	1	0	1	-1	N/A	(South Korea) Lee Jang-Soo

=== All competitions records ===
Seasoan	Teams	K-League	Championship	League Cup	FA Cup	AFC Champions League	Manager
2006	14	4th	4th (Semi-finals)	Winners	Quarter-finals	Did not qualify	(South Korea) Lee Jang-Soo

=== Attendance records ===
Season	Season Total Att.	K League Total Att.	Regular season Average Att.	League Cup Average Att.	FA Cup Total / Average Att.	ACL Total / Average Att.	Friendly Match Att.	Att. Ranking	Notes
2006	357,231	315,698	18,782	11,921	41,533 / 13,844	N/A	61,235 (FC Tokyo)	K League Season; Total Att. 2nd	FA Cup highest attendance new record in 2006 FA Cup Quarter-finals; Friendly match with FC Tokyo was for free

- Season total attendance is K League Regular Season, League Cup, FA Cup, AFC Champions League in the aggregate and friendly match attendance is not included.
- K League season total attendance is K League Regular Season and League Cup in the aggregate.

== Squad statistics ==
=== Goals ===
Pos	K League	League Cup	FA Cup	AFC Champions League	Total	Notes
1	(South Korea) Kim Eun-Jung (9)	(South Korea) Kim Eun-Jung (5)	(South Korea) Park Chu-Young (2)	Did not qualify	(South Korea) Kim Eun-Jung (15)	
2	(South Korea) Park Chu-Young (7)	(South Korea) Han Dong-Won (3)	(South Korea) Han Dong-Won (1) (South Korea) Kim Seung-Yong (1) (South Korea) Choi Jae-Soo (1) (Brazil) Dudu (1) (South Korea) Kim Eun-Jung (1) (South Korea) Han Tae-You (1) (South Korea) Jung Jo-Gook (1)	Did not qualify	(South Korea) Park Chu-Young (10)	
3	(South Korea) Jung Jo-Gook (4)	(South Korea) Jung Jo-Gook (2)	N/A	Did not qualify	(South Korea) Jung Jo-Gook (7)	
4	(Brazil) Dudu (3)	(Portugal) Ricardo (2)	N/A	Did not qualify	(South Korea) Han Dong-Won (6)	
5	(South Korea) Han Dong-Won (2)	(South Korea) Ahn Sang-Hyun (1)	N/A	Did not qualify	(Brazil) Dudu (4)	

=== Assists ===
Pos	K League	League Cup	Total	Notes
1	(South Korea) Choi Won-Kwon (3)	(Portugal) Ricardo (4)	(Portugal) Ricardo (6)	
2	(South Korea) Kim Eun-Jung (3)	(South Korea) Jung Jo-Gook (3)	(South Korea) Kim Eun-Jung (5)	
3	(Brazil) Dudu (2)	(Brazil) Adilson dos Santos (2)	(South Korea) Choi Won-Kwon (3)	
4	(Portugal) Ricardo (2)	(South Korea) Kim Eun-Jung (2)	(South Korea) Jung Jo-Gook (3)	
5	(South Korea) Kim Seung-Yong (1)	(South Korea) Lee Chung-Yong (1)	(South Korea) Kim Seung-Yong (2)	

== Coaching staff ==
Position	Name	Period	Notes
Manager	(South Korea) Lee Jang-Soo		
Assistant manager	(South Korea) Ko Jeong-Woon	Assistant manager Resigned (2006/05/21)	
First-team coach	(South Korea) Kim Yong-Kab		
First-team coach	(South Korea) Choi Yong-Soo	(2006/08/06-2006/12/31)	
Player Coach	(South Korea) Choi Yong-Soo	–2006/08/05	Player Retired (2006/08/05); 2 caps in K-League
Reserve Team Manager	(South Korea) Kim Sung-Nam		
Reserve Team Coach	(South Korea) Lee Won-Jun		
Goalkeeping coach	(Brazil) Leandro		
Fitness coach	Unknown		
Technical director & Chief Scout	(South Korea) Choi Gi-Bong		

== Players ==
=== Team squad ===
All players registered for the 2006 season are listed.

Note: Flags indicate national team as defined under FIFA eligibility rules; some limited exceptions apply. Players may hold more than one non-FIFA nationality.

No.	Pos.	Nation	Player
1	GK	KOR	Kim Byung-Ji
2	DF	KOR	Kwak Tae-Hwi
3	DF	KOR	Park Jung-Suk
4	DF	KOR	Kim Dong-Jin (Out)
5	DF	KOR	Lee Min-Sung (captain)
6	DF	KOR	Lee Ki-Hyung
7	MF	KOR	Choi Won-Kwon
8	MF	KOR	Baek Ji-Hoon (Out)
8	FW	BRA	Dudo (In)
9	FW	KOR	Jung Jo-Gook
10	FW	KOR	Park Chu-Young
11	FW	KOR	Choi Yong-Soo (Retired)
13	MF	KOR	Kim Tae-Jin
14	DF	KOR	Kim Han-Yoon
15	FW	KOR	Han Dong-Won
16	FW	KOR	Kim Seung-Yong (Conscripted)
17	DF	KOR	Lee Jung-Youl
18	FW	KOR	Kim Eun-Jung
19	DF	KOR	Ahn Tae-Eun
20	MF	KOR	Han Tae-You (Conscripted)
21	GK	KOR	Weon Jong-Teok
22	FW	KOR	Han Dong-Won
23	DF	KOR	Choi Jae-Soo
24	MF	KOR	Koh Myong-Jin

No.	Pos.	Nation	Player
25	DF	KOR	Yeo Hyo-Jin (Conscripted)
26	FW	KOR	Lee Sang-Hup
27	MF	KOR	Lee Chung-Yong
28	MF	KOR	Song Jin-Hyung
29	MF	KOR	Chun Je-Hun
30	DF	BRA	Adilson dos Santos
31	GK	KOR	Kim Ho-Jun
32	MF	KOR	Kim Tae-Jin
33	MF	KOR	Ahn Sang-Hyun
34	DF	KOR	Jung Sung-Ho
35	MF	KOR	Han Jung-Hwa
36	MF	KOR	Oh Ki-Jae
37	MF	KOR	Kim Dong-Suk
38	DF	KOR	Lee Kwang-Hee
39	FW	KOR	Lee Jun-Ki (Out)
40	MF	KOR	Ki Sung-Yueng
41	GK	KOR	Sim Woo-Yeon
42	MF	KOR	Bae Hae-Min
43	DF	KOR	Lee Ik-Sung
47	MF	KOR	Go Yo-Han
50	MF	POR	Ricardo Nascimento
77	MF	KOR	Lee Eul-Yong (In)
99	GK	KOR	Park Dong-Suk (Conscripted)

=== Out on loan & military service ===
Note: Flags indicate national team as defined under FIFA eligibility rules; some limited exceptions apply. Players may hold more than one non-FIFA nationality.

No.	Pos.	Nation	Player
—	DF	KOR	Yoon Hong-Chang (to (South Korea) Police FC until November 2006 / Discharged)
—	MF	KOR	Jung Chang-Kyun (to (South Korea) Police FC until November 2006 / Discharged)
—	DF	KOR	Park Yong-Ho (to (South Korea) Gwangju Sangmu until November 2006 / Discharged)
—	DF	KOR	Park Yo-Seb (to (South Korea) Gwangju Sangmu until December 2006 / Discharged)

No.	Pos.	Nation	Player
—	MF	KOR	Lee Ji-Nam (to (South Korea) Police FC until November 2007)
—	FW	KOR	Jung Jae-Yoon (to (South Korea) Police FC until November 2007)
—	MF	KOR	Ku Kyung-Hyun (to (South Korea) Gwangju Sangmu until November 2007)
—	MF	KOR	Cho Sung-Yong (to (South Korea) Gwangju Sangmu until November 2007)
—	MF	KOR	Lee Ik-Sung (to (South Korea) Gwangju Sangmu until November 2007)

- In : Transferred from other teams in the middle of season.
- Out : Transferred to other teams in the middle of season.
- Discharged : Transferred from Gwangju Sangmu and Police FC for military service after end of season. (Not registered in 2006 season.)
- Conscripted : Transferred to Gwangju Sangmu and Police FC for military service after end of season.

== Tactics ==
=== Starting eleven and formation ===
This section shows the most used players for each position considering a 3-5-2 formation.

No.	Pos.	Nat.	Name	MS	Notes
1	GK	(South Korea)	Kim Byung-Ji		
22	DF	(South Korea)	Kim Chi-Gon		
5	DF	(South Korea)	Lee Min-Sung		
30	DF	(Brazil)	Adilson		
19	MF	(South Korea)	Ahn Tae-Eun		
14	MF	(South Korea)	Kim Han-Yoon		
50	MF	(Portugal)	Ricardo		
20	MF	(South Korea)	Han Tae-You		
4	MF	(South Korea)	Kim Dong-Jin		
10	FW	(South Korea)	Park Chu-Young		
18	FW	(South Korea)	Kim Eun-Jung		

Source: Squad stats and Start formations.
Only competitive matches.
Using the most used start formation.
Ordered by position on pitch (from back right to front left).

=== Substitutes ===
No.	Pos.	Nat.	Name	MS	Notes
99	GK	(South Korea)	Park Dong-Suk		
2	MF	(South Korea)	Kwak Tae-Hwi		
6	DF	(South Korea)	Lee Ki-Hyung		
24	MF	(South Korea)	Koh Myong-Jin		
9	FW	(South Korea)	Jung Jo-Gook		
15	FW	(South Korea)	Han Dong-Won		

Source: Squad stats and Start formations.
Only competitive matches.
Using the most used start formation.
Ordered by position on pitch (from back right to front left).

== See also ==
- FC Seoul
