= List of FC Seoul managers =

This article is regarding all FC Seoul managers.

== Statistics ==
=== Managerial history ===
No.	Name	Appointed	From	To	Season	Notes
1	(South Korea) Park Se-hak	1983-08-12	1983-12-22	1987-11-19	1984–1987	First manager of FC Seoul.
C	(South Korea) Ko Jae-wook	1987-12-01	1987-12-01	1988-12-26	1988	Caretaker manager in 1988, before being promoted to regular manager in 1989.
2	(South Korea) Ko Jae-wook	1988-12-27	1988-12-27	1993-12-31	1989–1993	
3	(South Korea) Cho Young-jeung	1993-11-23	1994-01-01	1996-11-05	1994–1996	First manager who was a former FC Seoul player.; First manager who resigned in the middle of season.
C	(South Korea) Park Hang-seo	1996-11-05	1996-11-05	1996-12-01	1996	Caretaker manager in FA Cup, one match in charge.
4	(South Korea) Park Byung-joo	1996-12-10	1996-12-20	1998-11-25	1997–1998	Won the first FA Cup for FC Seoul.
5	(South Korea) Cho Kwang-rae	1998-10-22	1998-12-01	2004-12-15	1999–2004	The club's longest serving manager (6 seasons)
6	(South Korea) Lee Jang-soo	2004-12-30	2005-01-10	2006-12-02	2005–2006	Won the first League Cup for FC Seoul.
7	(Turkey) Şenol Güneş	2006-12-08	2007-01-08	2009-11-25	2007–2009	First foreign manager of FC Seoul.
8	(Portugal) Nelo Vingada	2009-12-14	2010-01-03	2010-12-13	2010	First (and only) manager to win the double.
9	(South Korea) Hwangbo Kwan	2010-12-28	2011-01-05	2011-04-26	2011	First manager who resigned in the middle of League.
C	(South Korea) Choi Yong-soo	2011-04-26	2011-04-26	2011-12-08	2011	Caretaker manager in 2011, before being promoted to regular manager in 2012.
10	(South Korea) Choi Yong-soo	2011-12-09	2011-12-09	2016-06-22	2012–2016	First manager who won K League as a FC Seoul player and a manager.
C	(South Korea) Kim Seong-jae	2016-06-23	2016-06-23	2016-06-26	2016	Caretaker manager in 2016, Left after one match in charge.
11	(South Korea) Hwang Sun-hong	2016-06-21	2016-06-27	2018-04-30	2016–2018	
C	(South Korea) Lee Eul-yong	2018-04-30	2018-04-30	2018-10-11	2018	
12	(South Korea) Choi Yong-soo	2018-10-11	2018-10-11	2020-07-30	2018–2020	First manager who was appointed twice.
C	(South Korea) Kim Ho-young	2020-08-04	2020-08-04	2020-09-24	2020	
C	(South Korea) Park Hyuk-soon	2020-09-25	2020-09-25	2020-11-12	2020	
C	(South Korea) Lee Won-jun	2020-11-13	2020-11-13	2020-12-03	2020	
13	(South Korea) Park Jin-sub	2020-12-08	2020-12-08	2021-09-06	2021	
14	(South Korea) An Ik-soo	2021-09-06	2021-09-06		2021–	

=== Match results ===
As of 25 June 2016

※ Win%, Draw%, Lose%, GFA, GAA: Only K League regular season (included K League Championship) and League Cup matches are counted.
※ Penalty shoot-outs results in 1993, 1998, 1999, 2000 seasons are not counted by K League's principle of official statistics.

No.	Name	Season	Pld	W	D	L	GF	GA	GD	Win%	Draw%	Lose%	GFA	GAA	Notes
1	(South Korea) Park Se-hak	1984–1987	117	39	32	46	141	158	-17	33%	27%	39%	1.21	1.35	
C	(South Korea) Ko Jae-wook	1988	209	67	82	60	237	228	+9	32%	39%	29%	1.13	1.09	
2	(South Korea) Ko Jae-wook	1989–1993	209	67	82	60	237	228	+9	32%	39%	29%	1.13	1.09	
3	(South Korea) Cho Young-jeung	1994–1996	111	31	33	47	147	173	-26	28%	30%	42%	1.32	1.56	
C	(South Korea) Park Hang-seo	1996													Only in charge of 1996 Korean FA Cup
4	(South Korea) Park Byung-joo	1997–1998	71	20	22	29	91	103	-12	28%	31%	41%	1.28	1.45	
5	(South Korea) Cho Kwang-rae	1999–2004	229	88	65	76	306	282	+24	38%	28%	33%	1.34	1.23	
6	(South Korea) Lee Jang-soo	2005–2006	76	30	25	21	106	84	+22	39%	33%	28%	1.39	1.11	
7	(Turkey) Şenol Güneş	2007–2009	110	51	37	22	154	100	+54	46%	34%	20%	1.40	0.91	
8	(Portugal) Nelo Vingada	2010	37	25	6	6	79	35	+44	68%	16%	16%	2.14	0.95	
9	(South Korea) Hwangbo Kwan	2011	7	1	3	3	6	10	-4	14%	43%	43%	0.86	1.43	
C	(South Korea) Choi Yong-soo	2011	198	102	51	45	312	211	+101	52%	26%	23%	1.58	1.07	
10	(South Korea) Choi Yong-soo	2012–2016	198	102	51	45	312	211	+101	52%	26%	23%	1.58	1.07	
C	(South Korea) Kim Seong-jae	2016	1	0	0	1	1	2	-1	0%	0%	100%	1	2	
11	(South Korea) Hwang Sun-hong	2016–2018													
C	(South Korea) Lee Eul-yong	2018													
12	(South Korea) Choi Yong-soo	2018–2020													
C	(South Korea) Kim Ho-young	2020													
C	(South Korea) Park Hyuk-soon	2020													
C	(South Korea) Lee Won-jun	2020													
13	(South Korea) Park Jin-sub	2021													
14	(South Korea) An Ik-soo	2021–present													

=== Honours ===
No.	Name	Season	K League	League Cup	FA Cup	ACL	Other competitions	Notes
1	(South Korea) Park Se-hak	1984–1987	Champions (1): 1985; Runners-up (1): 1986					
C	(South Korea) Ko Jae-wook	1988	Champions(1): 1990; Runners-up (1): 1989	Runners-up (1): 1992			National Football Championship; Champions (1): 1988	
2	(South Korea) Ko Jae-wook	1989–1993	Champions(1): 1990; Runners-up (1): 1989	Runners-up (1): 1992			National Football Championship; Champions (1): 1988	
3	(South Korea) Cho Young-jeung	1994–1996	Runners-up (1): 1993	Runners-up (1): 1994				
C	(South Korea) Park Hang-seo	1996						
4	(South Korea) Park Byung-joo	1997–1998			Champions (1): (1998)			
5	(South Korea) Cho Kwang-rae	1999–2004	Champions (1): 2000; Runners-up (1): 2001	Runners-up (1): 1999		Runners-up (1): (2002)	Super Cup; Champions (1): 2001; Runners-up (1): 1999	
6	(South Korea) Lee Jang-soo	2005–2006		Champions (1): 2006				
7	(Turkey) Şenol Güneş	2007–2009	Runners-up (1): 2008	Runners-up (1): 2007				
8	(Portugal) Nelo Vingada	2010	Champions (1): 2010	Champions (1): 2010				
9	(South Korea) Hwangbo Kwan	2011						
C	(South Korea) Choi Yong-soo	2011	Champions (1): 2012		Champions (1): (2015); Runners-up (1): (2014)	Runners-up (1): (2013)		
10	(South Korea) Choi Yong-soo	2012–2016	Champions (1): 2012		Champions (1): (2015); Runners-up (1): (2014)	Runners-up (1): (2013)		
C	(South Korea) Kim Seong-jae	2016						
11	(South Korea) Hwang Sun-hong	2016–2018	Champions (1): 2016		Champions (1): 2016			
C	(South Korea) Lee Eul-yong	2018						
12	(South Korea) Choi Yong-soo	2018–2020						
C	(South Korea) Kim Ho-young	2020						
C	(South Korea) Park Hyuk-soon	2020						
C	(South Korea) Lee Won-jun	2020						
13	(South Korea) Park Jin-sub	2021						
14	(South Korea) An Ik-soo	2021–						
