= 2018 FC Seoul season =

FC Seoul
2018 season
- Chairman: Huh Chang-soo
- Manager: Hwang Sun-hong (–30 April); Lee Eul-yong (30 April–)
- Stadium: Seoul World Cup Stadium
- K League 1: 11th
- Top goalscorer: League: Go Yo-han (8 goals); All: Go Yo-han (9 goals)
Home colours	Away colours

The 2018 season was FC Seoul's 35th season in the K League 1, the top tier of the South Korean football league system.

== Pre-season ==
- In Murcia, Spain: From 6 January 2018 to 7 February 2018
- In Kagoshima, Japan: From 14 February 2018 to 22 February 2018

=== Pre-season match results ===
Type	Date	Opponents	Result	Score	Scorers	Notes
Practice matches during winter training spell in Murcia, Spain	10 January 2018	(Belgium) R. Charleroi S.C.	L	0–1		
Practice matches during winter training spell in Murcia, Spain	12 January 2018	(Belgium) K.S.C. Lokeren Oost-Vlaanderen	L	0–1		
Practice matches during winter training spell in Murcia, Spain	16 January 2018	(Germany) Holstein Kiel	W	2–1	(South Korea) Go Yo-han, (South Korea) Kim Sung-joon	
Practice matches during winter training spell in Murcia, Spain	19 January 2018	(Liechtenstein) FC Vaduz	L	0–1		
Practice matches during winter training spell in Murcia, Spain	26 January 2018	(China) Yanbian Funde	D	0–0		
Practice matches during winter training spell in Murcia, Spain	30 January 2018	(Denmark) FC Nordsjælland	L	0–3		
Practice matches during winter training spell in Murcia, Spain	2 February 2018	(Republic of Ireland) Dundalk	L	0–1		
Practice matches during winter training spell in Murcia, Spain	5 February 2018	(Sweden) Örebro SK	W	1–0	(South Korea) Park Chu-young	
Practice matches during winter training spell in Kagoshima, Japan	17 January 2018	(Japan) Matsumoto Yamaga	D	0–0		
Practice matches during winter training spell in Kagoshima, Japan	20 January 2018	(Japan) Tokai University	W	7–0	Go Yo-han, Jeong Hyeon-cheol, Park Chu-young; Cho Young-wook, Lee Sang-ho, Kwak Tae-hwi	

== Competitions ==
=== Overview ===
Competition	Starting round	Final position	Record							
Competition	Starting round	Final position	Pld	W	D	L	GF	GA	GD	Win %
K League 1	Matchday 1	Matchday 38					—			
FA Cup	Round of 32						—			
Total			0	0	0	0	0	0	+0	—

Last updated: 31 December 2018
Source: Fixtures and Results at FC Seoul Official Website

== Match reports and match highlights ==
Fixtures and Results at FC Seoul Official Website (in English)

== Season statistics ==
=== K League 1 records ===
Season	Teams	Final Position	Pld	W	D	L	GF	GA	GD	Pts	Manager
2018	12	11	38	9	13	16	40	48	–8	40	(South Korea) Hwang Sun-hong (South Korea) Lee Eul-yong (Caretaker) (South Korea) Choi Yong-soo

=== All competitions records ===
K League 1	FA Cup	AFC Champions League	Manager
		Round of 16	(South Korea) Hwang Sun-hong (South Korea) Lee Eul-yong (Caretaker) (South Korea) Choi Yong-soo

=== Attendance records ===
Season Total Att.	K League 1 Season Total Att.	K League 1 Season Average Att.	FA Cup Total / Average Att.	ACL Total / Average Att.	Att. Ranking	Notes

- Season total attendance is K League 1, FA Cup, and AFC Champions League combined

== Squad statistics ==
=== Goals ===
Pos	K League 1	FA Cup	AFC Champions League	Total	Notes
1	(South Korea)	(South Korea)			

=== Assists ===
Pos	K League 1	League Cup	Total	Notes
1				

== Coaching staff ==
=== Hwang Sun-hong Era (~2018-04-30) ===
Position	Name	Notes
Manager	(South Korea) Hwang Sun-hong	
Assistant manager	(South Korea) Kang Chul	
First-team coach	(South Korea) Yoon Hee-joon	
First-team coach	(Brazil) Adilson dos Santos	
First-team goalkeeping coach	(South Korea) Kim Il-jin	
Reserve Team Coach	(South Korea) Lee Eul-yong	
Reserve Team Goalkeeping Coach	(South Korea) Back Min-chul	
Fitness coach	(South Korea) Shin Sang-kyu	
U-18 Team Manager	(South Korea) Myong Jin-young	
U-18 Team Coach	(South Korea) Kim Jin-kyu	
U-18 Team Goalkeeping Coach	(South Korea) Weon Jong-teok	
U-18 Team Fitness Coach	(South Korea) Hwang Ji-hwan	
U-15 Team Manager	(South Korea) Kim Young-jin	
U-15 Team Coach	(South Korea) Park Hyuk-soon	
U-15 Team Goalkeeping Coach	(South Korea) Son Il-pyo	
U-15 Team Fitness Coach	(South Korea) Jung Hoon-gi	
U-12 Team Manager	(South Korea) Kim Byung-chae	
U-12 Team Coach	(South Korea) Seo Ki-man	
U-12 Team Goalkeeping Coach	(South Korea) Lee Ji-hun	
Chief scout	(South Korea) Kim Hyun-tae	
Scout	(South Korea) Lee Won-jun	
Scout	(South Korea) Jung Jae-yoon	
Scout	(South Korea) Park Yong-ho	

=== Lee Eul-yong Era (2018-04-30~2018-10-11) ===
Position	Name	Notes
Caretake Manager	(South Korea) Lee Eul-yong	
First-team coach	(South Korea) Kim Seong-jae	May 2018~
First-team coach	(South Korea) Park Yong-ho	May 2018~
First-team coach	(Brazil) Adilson dos Santos	
First-team goalkeeping coach	(South Korea) Back Min-chul	May 2018~
Reserve Team Coach	(South Korea) Yoon Hee-joon	May 2018~
Reserve Team Goalkeeping Coach	(South Korea) Kim Il-jin	May 2018~
Fitness coach	(South Korea) Shin Sang-kyu	
U-18 Team Manager	(South Korea) Myong Jin-young	
U-18 Team Coach	(South Korea) Kim Jin-kyu	
U-18 Team Goalkeeping Coach	(South Korea) Weon Jong-teok	
U-18 Team Fitness Coach	(South Korea) Hwang Ji-hwan	
U-15 Team Manager	(South Korea) Kim Young-jin	
U-15 Team Coach	(South Korea) Park Hyuk-soon	
U-15 Team Goalkeeping Coach	(South Korea) Son Il-pyo	
U-15 Team Fitness Coach	(South Korea) Jung Hoon-gi	
U-12 Team Manager	(South Korea) Kim Byung-chae	
U-12 Team Coach	(South Korea) Seo Ki-man	
U-12 Team Goalkeeping Coach	(South Korea) Lee Ji-hun	
Chief scout	(South Korea) Kim Hyun-tae	
Scout	(South Korea) Lee Won-jun	
Scout	(South Korea) Jung Jae-yoon	

=== Choi Yong-soo Era (2018-10-11~) ===
Position	Name	Notes
Manager	(South Korea) Choi Yong-soo	
First-team coach	(South Korea) Kim Seong-jae	
First-team coach	(South Korea) Yoon Hee-joon	
First-team coach	(Brazil) Adilson dos Santos	
First-team goalkeeping coach	(South Korea) Back Min-chul	
Reserve Team Coach	(South Korea) Park Yong-ho	
Reserve Team Goalkeeping Coach	(South Korea) Kim Il-jin	
Fitness coach	(South Korea) Shin Sang-kyu	
U-18 Team Manager	(South Korea) Myong Jin-young	
U-18 Team Coach	(South Korea) Kim Jin-kyu	
U-18 Team Goalkeeping Coach	(South Korea) Weon Jong-teok	
U-18 Team Fitness Coach	(South Korea) Hwang Ji-hwan	
U-15 Team Manager	(South Korea) Kim Young-jin	
U-15 Team Coach	(South Korea) Park Hyuk-soon	
U-15 Team Goalkeeping Coach	(South Korea) Son Il-pyo	
U-15 Team Fitness Coach	(South Korea) Jung Hoon-gi	
U-12 Team Manager	(South Korea) Kim Byung-chae	
U-12 Team Coach	(South Korea) Seo Ki-man	
U-12 Team Goalkeeping Coach	(South Korea) Lee Ji-hun	
Chief scout	(South Korea) Kim Hyun-tae	
Scout	(South Korea) Lee Won-jun	
Scout	(South Korea) Jung Jae-yoon	

== Players ==
=== Team squad ===
All players registered for the 2018 season are listed.

No.	Pos.	Nationality	Player	Notes
1	GK	South Korea	Yoo Hyun	
2	DF	South Korea	Hwang Hyun-soo	
3	DF	South Korea	Lee Woong-hee (vice-captain)	
4	DF	South Korea	Kim Dong-woo	
6	MF	South Korea	Kim Sung-joon	
7	FW	South Korea	Lee Sang-ho	
8	MF	South Korea	Sin Jin-ho	
9	FW	Brazil	Anderson Lopes	
10	FW	South Korea	Park Chu-young	
11	FW	Brazil	Evandro	
13	MF	South Korea	Go Yo-han (captain)	
14	MF	South Korea	Kim Han-gil	
15	MF	South Korea	Kim Won-sik	
16	MF	South Korea	Ha Dae-sung	
17	DF	South Korea	Shin Kwang-hoon	
18	DF	South Korea	Yun Suk-young	In
19	DF	South Korea	Sim Sang-min	
20	DF	South Korea	Park Jun-yeong	
21	GK	South Korea	Yang Han-been	
22	MF	South Korea	Yoon Seung-won	
23	MF	South Korea	Lee Seok-hyun	Out
24	FW	South Korea	Jung Hyun-cheol	
25	DF	South Korea	Pak Min-gyu	
26	DF	South Korea	Kim Nam-chun	Discharged
27	MF	South Korea	Shin Seong-jae	
28	MF	South Korea	Hwang Ki-wook	
29	FW	South Korea	Park Hee-seong	
30	GK	South Korea	Jeong Jin-wook	
31	GK	South Korea	Son Moo-been	
32	FW	South Korea	Cho Young-wook	
36	FW	South Korea	Park Sung-min	
37	MF	South Korea	Song Jin-hyung	
38	DF	South Korea	Yoon Jong-gyu	
40	DF	South Korea	Kim Won-gun	
41	GK	South Korea	Yu Sang-hun	Discharged
47	FW	South Korea	Kim Woo-hong	
50	DF	South Korea	Park Dong-jin	
55	DF	South Korea	Kwak Tae-hwi	
72	MF	South Korea	Jung Won-jin	In
77	FW	Croatia	Ivan Kovačec	Out
77	FW	South Korea	Yun Ju-tae	Discharged
99	FW	Serbia	Bojan Matić	In

=== Out on loan and military service ===
No.	Pos.	Nationality	Player	Moving To	Loan Period
—	GK	South Korea	Yu Sang-hun	(South Korea) Sangju Sangmu	2016/12–2018/09
—	DF	South Korea	Kim Nam-chun	(South Korea) Sangju Sangmu	2016/12–2018/09
—	FW	South Korea	Yun Ju-tae	(South Korea) Sangju Sangmu	2016/12–2018/09
—	DF	South Korea	Ko Kwang-min	(South Korea) Hwaseong FC	2016/12–2018/09
—	MF	South Korea	Ju Se-jong	(South Korea) Asan Mugunghwa	2018/01–2019/10
—	MF	South Korea	Lee Myung-joo	(South Korea) Asan Mugunghwa	2018/01–2019/10
—	MF	South Korea	Lee Kyu-ro	(South Korea) FC Pocheon	2018/01–2019/12
—	MF	South Korea	Kim Ju-yeong	(South Korea) FC Pocheon	2018/01–2020/06
—	MF	Spain	Osmar	(Japan) Cerezo Osaka	2018/02–2019/01

Note: Where a player has not declared an international allegiance, nation is determined by place of birth.
※ In: Transferred from other teams in the middle of the season.
※ Out: Transferred to other teams in the middle of the season.
※ Discharged: Transferred from Sanjgu Sangmu or Ansan Mugunghwa for military service in the middle of the season (registered in 2019 season).
※ Conscripted: Transferred to Sangju Sangmu or Ansan Mugunghwa for military service after the end of the season.

== See also ==
- FC Seoul
