= FC Seoul =

Association football club in South Korea

- Full name: Football Club Seoul
- Nickname: 검붉은 전사 (Dark Red Warriors)
- Founded: December 22, 1983; 42 years ago (as Lucky-Goldstar FC)
- Ground: Seoul World Cup Stadium
- Capacity: 66,704
- Owner: GS Group
- Chairman: Huh Tae-soo
- Manager: Kim Gi-dong
- League: K League 1
- 2026: K League 1, 1st of 12 (champions)
- Website: www.fcseoul.com
Home colours	Away colours

FC Seoul (Korean: FC 서울) is a South Korean professional football club based in Seoul that competes in the K League 1, the top flight of South Korean football. The club is owned by GS Sports, a subsidiary of GS Group. Since 2004, FC Seoul has played its home games at the Seoul World Cup Stadium in Seoul's Mapo District.

The club was founded as Lucky-Goldstar Football Club in 1983, by the Lucky-Goldstar Group, and was later renamed LG Cheetahs in 1990. Due to the K League decentralization policy in 1996, the club was relocated to the Seoul's satellite city of Anyang for eight years, before returning to Seoul in 2004. FC Seoul has won seven K League titles, two FA Cups, two League Cups and one Super Cup. Internationally, the club reached the AFC Champions League final on two occasions, in 2001–02 and 2013.

FC Seoul is one of the most successful and popular clubs in the K League 1, with financial backing from the GS Group. In 2012, the club was evaluated as the most valuable football brand in the K League. Their main rivals are Suwon Samsung Bluewings, with whom they contest the Super Match.

== History ==
=== Founding and early years (1983–1989) ===
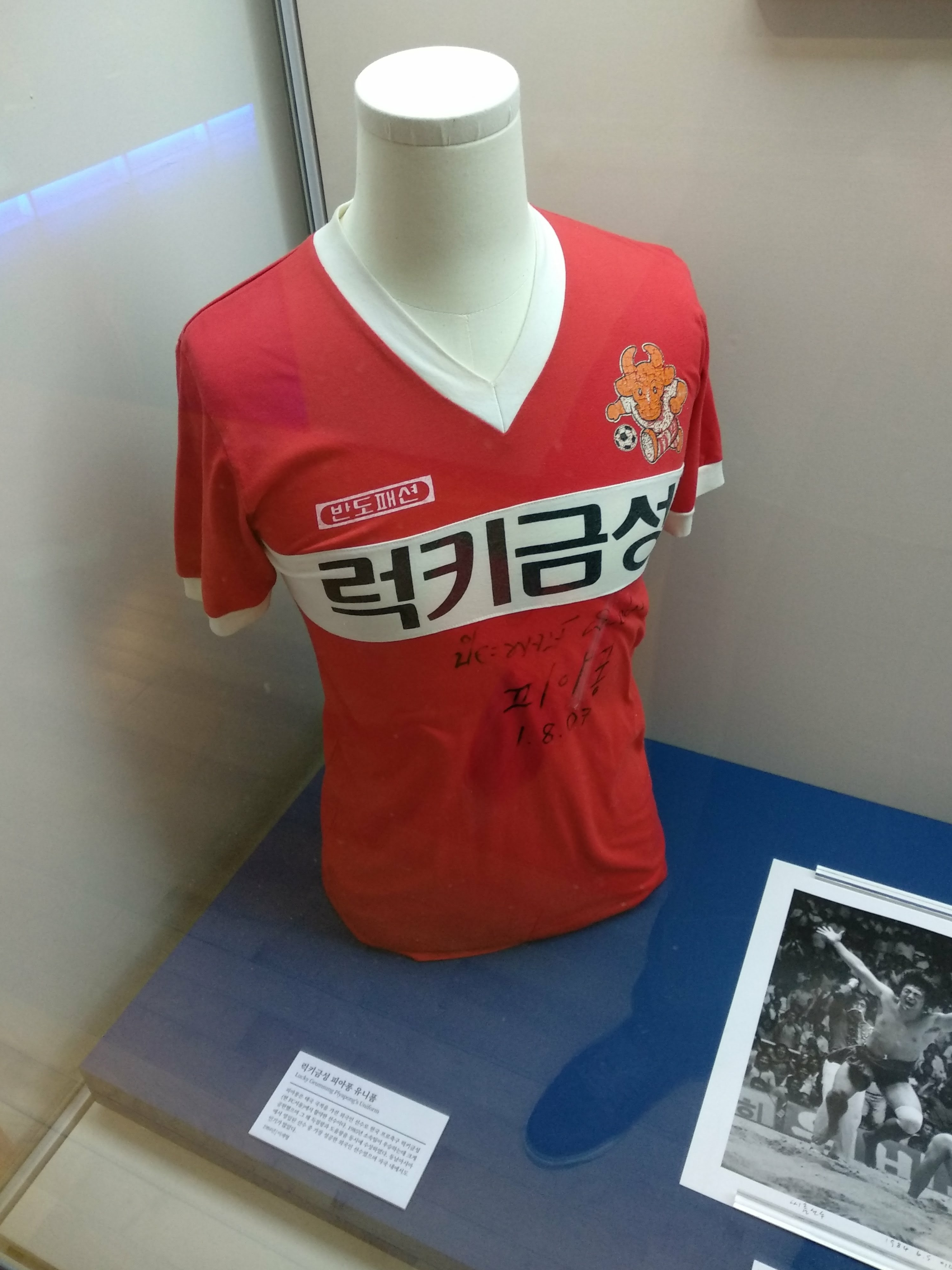
Piyapong Pue-on's signed kit on display at the National Museum of Korean Contemporary History

FC Seoul held an official founding ceremony on December 22, 1983, following the official announcement of its founding in August of that year. The club was initially named Lucky-Goldstar Hwangso Football Club. Owned and financially supported by the Lucky-Goldstar Group, it became the fifth professional football team in South Korea. The founding hometown was assigned to Chungcheong Province, and its mascot became a bull.

To establish a professional football club, the Lucky-Goldstar Group had a preparatory period since 1982 and requested that the franchise be located in Seoul. In the 1984 season, the club finished seventh out of eight clubs. It fared better in the 1985 season, winning the league title with the help of Thai international Piyapong Pue-on, who was the league's top scorer as well as the top assist provider.

=== Moving to Seoul and then to Anyang (1990–2003) ===
From the beginning of 1988, Lucky-Goldstar Hwangso pushed forward a relocation to Seoul. At the end of the 1989 season, the Korea Professional Football League (renamed as the K League in 1998), worried about the financial stability of the clubs, invited a number of clubs to play in Seoul. Thus, the Lucky-Goldstar Hwangso, which had always wanted to be based in the capital, moved to Seoul Stadium (currently Dongdaemun Stadium) in Seoul at the end of 1989. The club finished its first season in Seoul as champions. The club changed its name to LG Cheetahs in 1991 to mirror the LG Twins, a professional baseball team also owned by LG Group. After several seasons in Seoul, the club was forced to move in 1996, as part of the K League's decentralization policy. This policy was carried out to stimulate the growth of football in the provinces. In addition, in 1995, Korea was bidding to host the 2002 FIFA World Cup. This warranted the construction of a soccer-specific stadium in Seoul. The three clubs based in Seoul – LG Cheetahs, Ilhwa Chunma, and Yukong Elephants did not want to recognize the decentralization policy. Ultimately, it proved necessary for the Korean government to issue an eviction order to the disaffected clubs. However, the government did guarantee if the clubs built a soccer-specific stadium in Seoul, the clubs could have a Seoul franchise and return to Seoul.

As a result, 3 clubs were evicted from Seoul to other cities. This entailed the move of the LG Cheetahs to the Anyang Sports Complex in the city of Anyang, a satellite city of Seoul, 21 km away. The club was now known as the Anyang LG Cheetahs. In the upcoming years, a solid base of supporters was formed, and it established a strong league rivalry with the Suwon Samsung Bluewings. This rivalry was partly fueled by the fact that LG Group and Samsung Group, which owned the Suwon club, were also considered rivals in the business world, especially in electronics. The club continued to grow and in 2000, they won their third Championship, behind the firepower of striker Choi Yong-Soo.

=== Return to Seoul and renaming to FC Seoul (2004–2006) ===
For the 2002 FIFA World Cup in South Korea and Japan, ten brand new stadiums of World Cup standards were built in South Korea. After the World Cup, the Korean World Cup Organizing Committee and the KFA actively supported the move of regional K League clubs into the new stadia. This was designed to avoid or at least minimize any financial losses through having to maintain a stadium in playing condition without regular income. However, due to the previous decision by the K League to exclude any member club from being based in Seoul, Seoul World Cup Stadium remained vacant, except as a host of some international friendlies. Thus, the city government of Seoul and the KFA both actively sought for a K League club to play at the stadium to take on the cost of maintaining the stadium. Initially, it was intended to create a new club, but when it later transpired that any club playing in Seoul World Cup Stadium would have to pay partially for the construction fees of the stadium, this would have placed an unreasonable burden on a fledgling club. Thus, the KFA tried to lure one of the current clubs to Seoul. The Anyang LG Cheetahs, with the financial backing of the LG Group, who not only viewed the move back to Seoul as a way to increase its advertising presence, but had the right to come back to Seoul because it had its franchise moved by force in 1996, as part of the K League's decentralization policy. Anyang LG announced in February 2004 that it would pay the share of the construction fees (which turned out to be 15 billion won, or at that time US$15 million). This proposed move provoked a significant amount of controversy from the Korean football fans as KFA and K League failed to launch a new football club based in Seoul due to a high Seoul franchise fee. Regardless, KFA and K League ultimately permitted relocation of Anyang LG Cheetahs.

=== Şenol Güneş years (2007–2009) ===
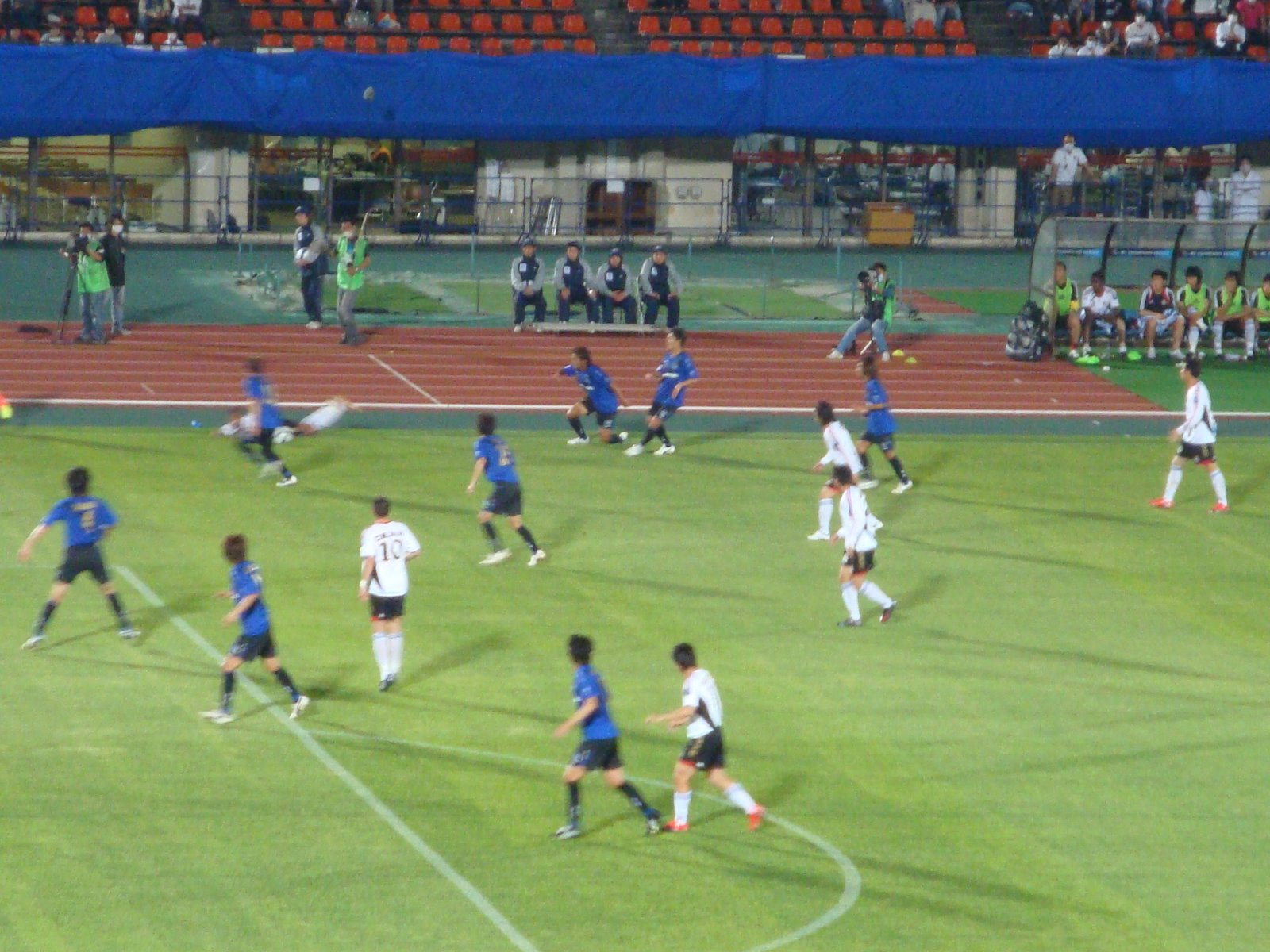
FC Seoul vs Gamba Osaka in the 2009 AFC Champions League

Şenol Güneş managed FC Seoul for a three-year period starting on December 8, 2006. The club started the 2007 season with three consecutive wins and a draw, including a 4–1 win over arch rivals Suwon Samsung Bluewings in the Super Match. However, FC Seoul failed to qualify for the play-off phase of the season, but the club succeeded in getting into the final of the 2007 Korean League Cup. Before the next season, Park Chu-young, the ace of FC Seoul at that time, was transferred to Ligue 1 club Monaco. FC Seoul finished in a second-place in the K League regular season, and progressed to the play-offs. FC Seoul defeated Ulsan Hyundai in the play-off semi-final but was defeated by Suwon Samsung Bluewings in the final. Despite the loss, the club still qualified for the 2009 AFC Champions League. During the season, Dejan Damjanović scored 15 goals.

FC Seoul's 2009 AFC Champions League campaign began with a 2–1 win over Indonesian side Sriwijaya FC. In the next three games, FC Seoul obtained only one point in the matches against Gamba Osaka and Shandong Luneng. However, Seoul then defeated the title holders Gamba Osaka and qualified to the round of 16 after Sriwijaya's unexpected victory over Shandong Luneng. On June 24, 2009, FC Seoul beat Kashima Antlers 5–4 after penalties after a 0–0 draw in the round of 16 clash and advanced to the quarter-finals, but were beaten 4–3 on aggregate by Qatari club Umm Salal. FC Seoul's appearance in the AFC Champions League was its first since the Asian Club Championship era.

The Şenol Güneş era ended on November 25, 2009, with the manager returning to Trabzonspor.

=== K League and League Cup "double" (2010) ===
FC Seoul appointed Nelo Vingada as manager on December 14, 2009. Vingada won the K League and League Cup with FC Seoul. FC Seoul had 20 wins, 2 draws, and 6 defeats in the domestic league under Vingada's management.

FC Seoul recorded an attendance of 60,747 against Seongnam Ilhwa on May 5, 2010, at Seoul World Cup Stadium, which is the highest single-game attendance record in South Korean professional sports history. FC Seoul also recorded the single season (League, K League Championship, and League Cup) highest total attendance record – 546,397, and the single regular & post season (League and K League Championship) highest average attendance record of 32,576.

On August 25, 2010, FC Seoul beat Jeonbuk Hyundai Motors 3–0 to become the 2010 League Cup winners. FC Seoul were also crowned K League champions by defeating Jeju United 4–3 on aggregate in the K League Championship final, thus achieving their first "double" in the club's history. The crowd of 56,769 in the second leg also set the record of the highest attendance in K League Championship history.

On December 13, 2010, FC Seoul wanted to extend Vingada's one-year contract but FC Seoul and Vingada could not come to an agreement over the salary conditions, resulting in Vingada returning to Portugal.

=== AFC Champions League final and the sixth K League title (2011–2016) ===
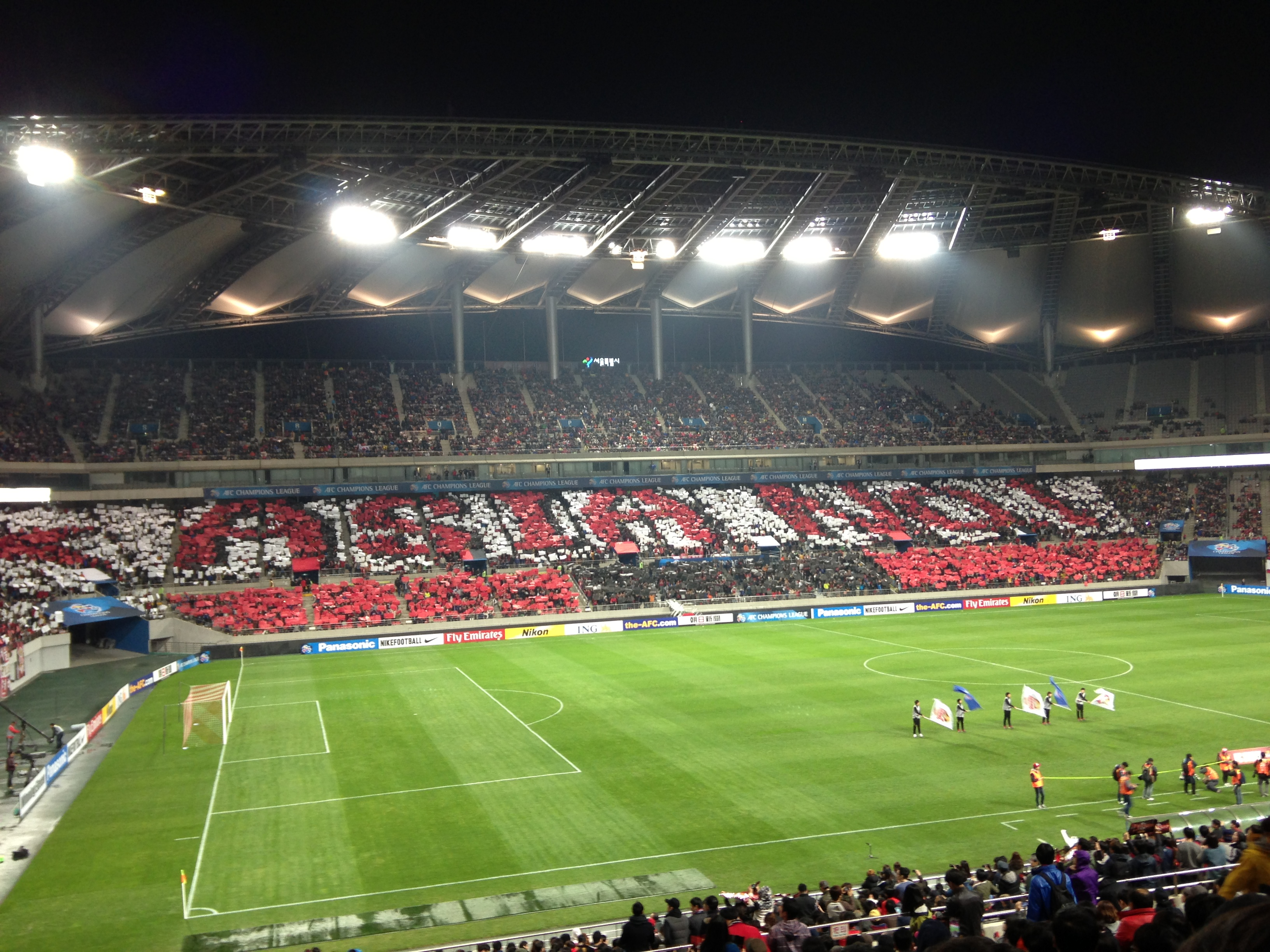
Seoul's home leg of the 2013 AFC Champions League final at Seoul World Cup Stadium

FC Seoul's former player Choi Yong-soo was hired to manage the club in 2012, after previously serving as the assistant manager and caretaker for the club in 2011. In 2013, FC Seoul lost the AFC Champions League final on away goals rule against Chinese side Guangzhou Evergrande. The AFC Champions League campaign has earned Choi Yong-soo the 2013 AFC Coach of the Year award, becoming the second South Korean in succession to win the individual accolade following the previous year's winner Kim Ho-kon. Choi left the club in June 2016.

On June 21, 2016, FC Seoul appointed Hwang Sun-hong as their eleventh manager in the club's history. On November 6, 2016, FC Seoul won their sixth K League title after defeating Jeonbuk Hyundai Motors 1–0 in the final round of the season.

=== A period of oscillation (2017–present) ===
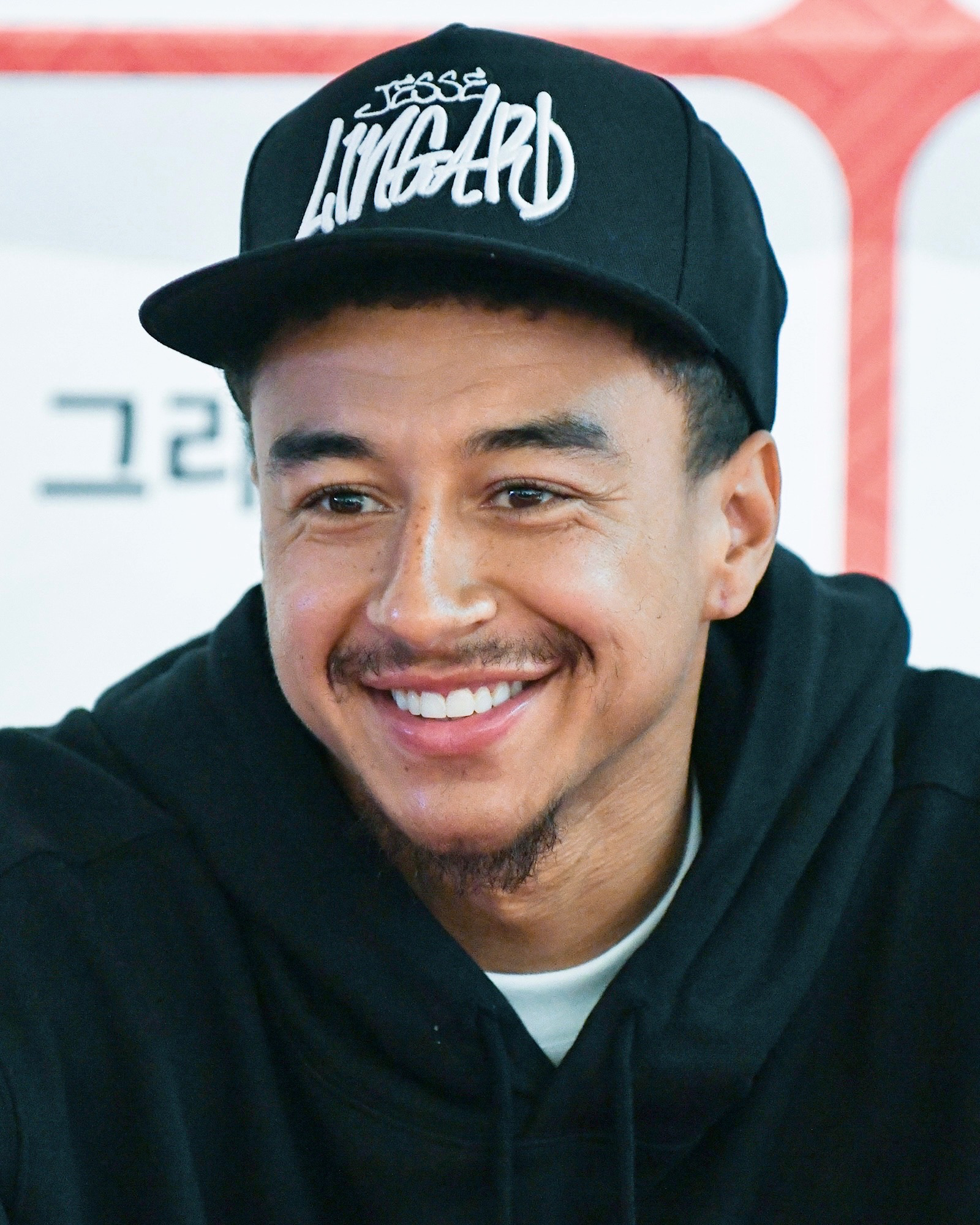
Jesse Lingard joined FC Seoul in 2024 to become one of the biggest star signings in the club's history

Hwang Sun-hong resigned on April 30, 2018. In the 2018 season, FC Seoul finished in eleventh place and had to play the K League promotion-relegation playoffs for the first time in their history. In the playoffs, they defeated Busan IPark 4–2 on aggregate, thus staying in the top flight.

On October 11, 2018, Choi Yong-soo was appointed as the twelfth manager in the club's history, having previously managed the club between 2011 and 2016.

During the 2020 season, FC Seoul lost five consecutive games for the first time in 22 years. Following a new departure by Choi Yong-soo, three different caretakers took turns managing the team, with Park Hyuk-soon replacing Kim Ho-young after just a month and guiding the team to the end of the K League season, which they finished in ninth place, before being substituted by Lee Won-jun; under his management, the team made a promising start in the group stage of the 2020 AFC Champions League, even obtaining a 5–0 victory against Thai outfit Chiangrai United, but then proceeded to lose all of their last three matches, thus being eliminated from the tournament. A difficult season was made even more devastating by the death of defender Kim Nam-chun on October 30, 2020, just a day before their last K League 1 fixture against Incheon United.

In the 2024 K League 1 season, the club broke average attendance records due to a recovery of the league itself and the signing of Jesse Lingard, as the club finished in the top half of K League 1 for the first time since 2019 and qualified for the 2025–26 AFC Champions League Elite. Lingard was appointed captain ahead of the 2025 season, but left the club after a disappointing sixth-place league finish, scoring against A-League side Melbourne City in the Champions League in his last game for Seoul.

== Club culture ==
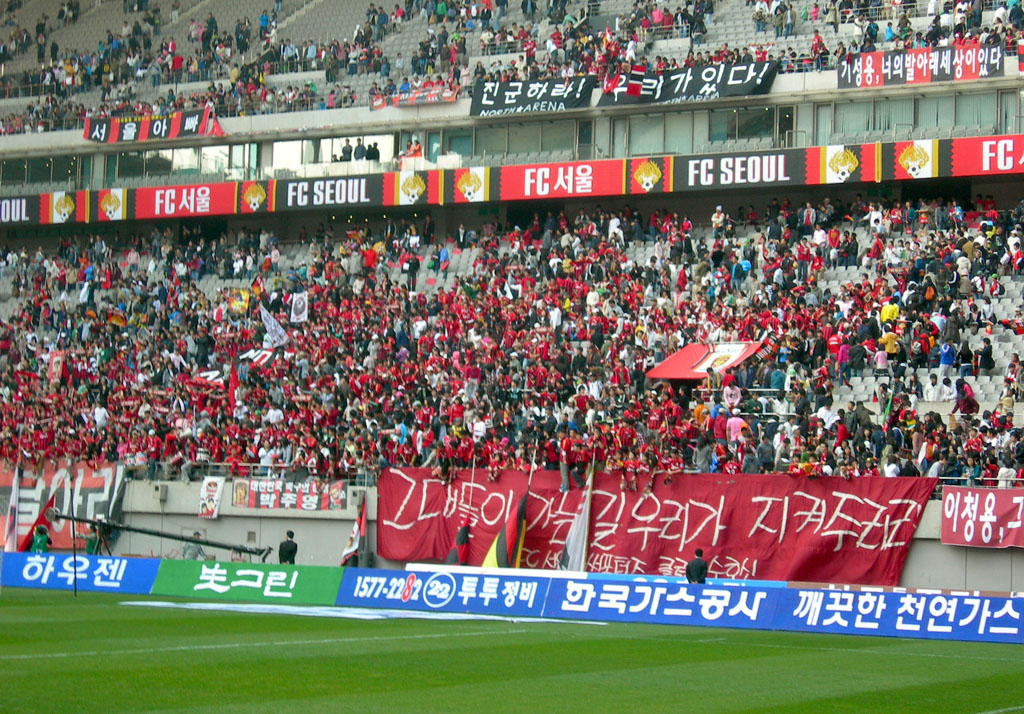
FC Seoul supporters at North Stand of the Seoul World Cup Stadium

=== Supporters ===
FC Seoul has a diverse fanbase, including former Lucky-Goldstar fans, LG Cheetahs fans, and Anyang LG Cheetahs fans. The club's number 12 shirt is reserved for supporters of the club. The main supporters group of FC Seoul is called Suhoshin (meaning "guardian deity"), formed in April 2004.

=== Rivalries ===
The club's main rivalry is with Suwon Samsung Bluewings in a derby known as the Super Match, as two of the most successful teams in the Seoul Capital Area. The rivalry began during the Anyang LG Cheetahs era and has continued as the club was relocated to Seoul.

Other major rivalries include Jeonbuk Hyundai Motors (Jeonseol Match) and Incheon United (Gyeongin Derby). In an away match versus Incheon in May 2024, the home fans at the Incheon Football Stadium threw water bottles at Seoul players.

Fans of FC Anyang, a phoenix club that was founded in Anyang since the departure of Anyang LG Cheetahs, feel great animosity towards FC Seoul and a willingness to get their revenge on the pitch, with Anyang's fans lighting flares in a show of defiance in a 2017 Korean FA Cup match versus FC Seoul. Anyang's first-ever appearance in the 2025 K League 1 season allowed them to play against FC Seoul in a league match for the first time in the "Relocation Derby."

=== V-Girls and V-Man ===
V-Girls & V-Man are FC Seoul's cheerleaders. The V stands for victory. They cheerlead at the East Stand.

== Stadiums ==
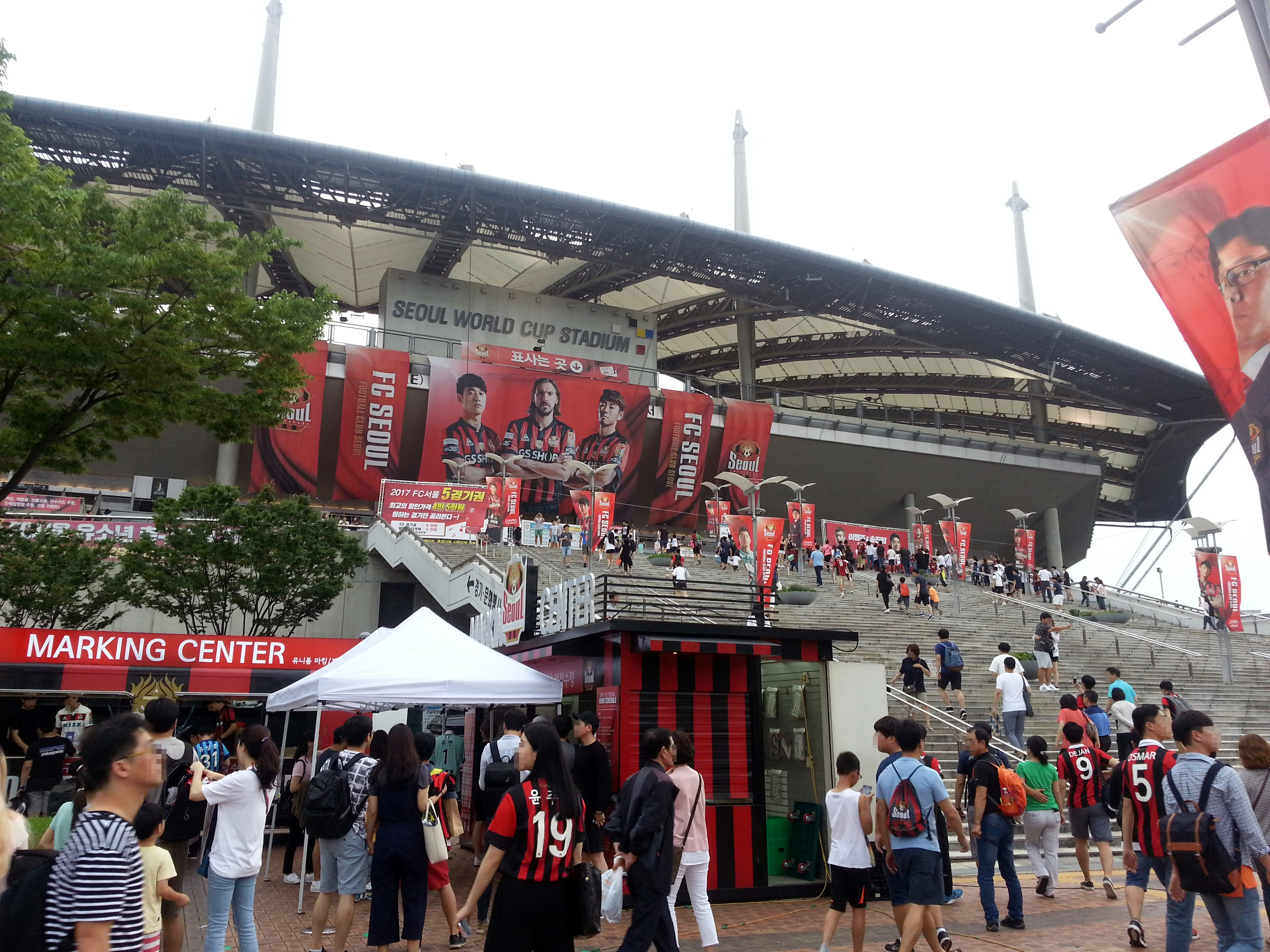
Seoul World Cup Stadium in 2017

Since 2004, FC Seoul's home is the Seoul World Cup Stadium, which is the largest football-specific stadium in South Korea. FC Seoul's players train at the GS Champions Park training center, a purpose-built facility completed in 1989 located east of Seoul in the city of Guri, where the club's academy is also based.

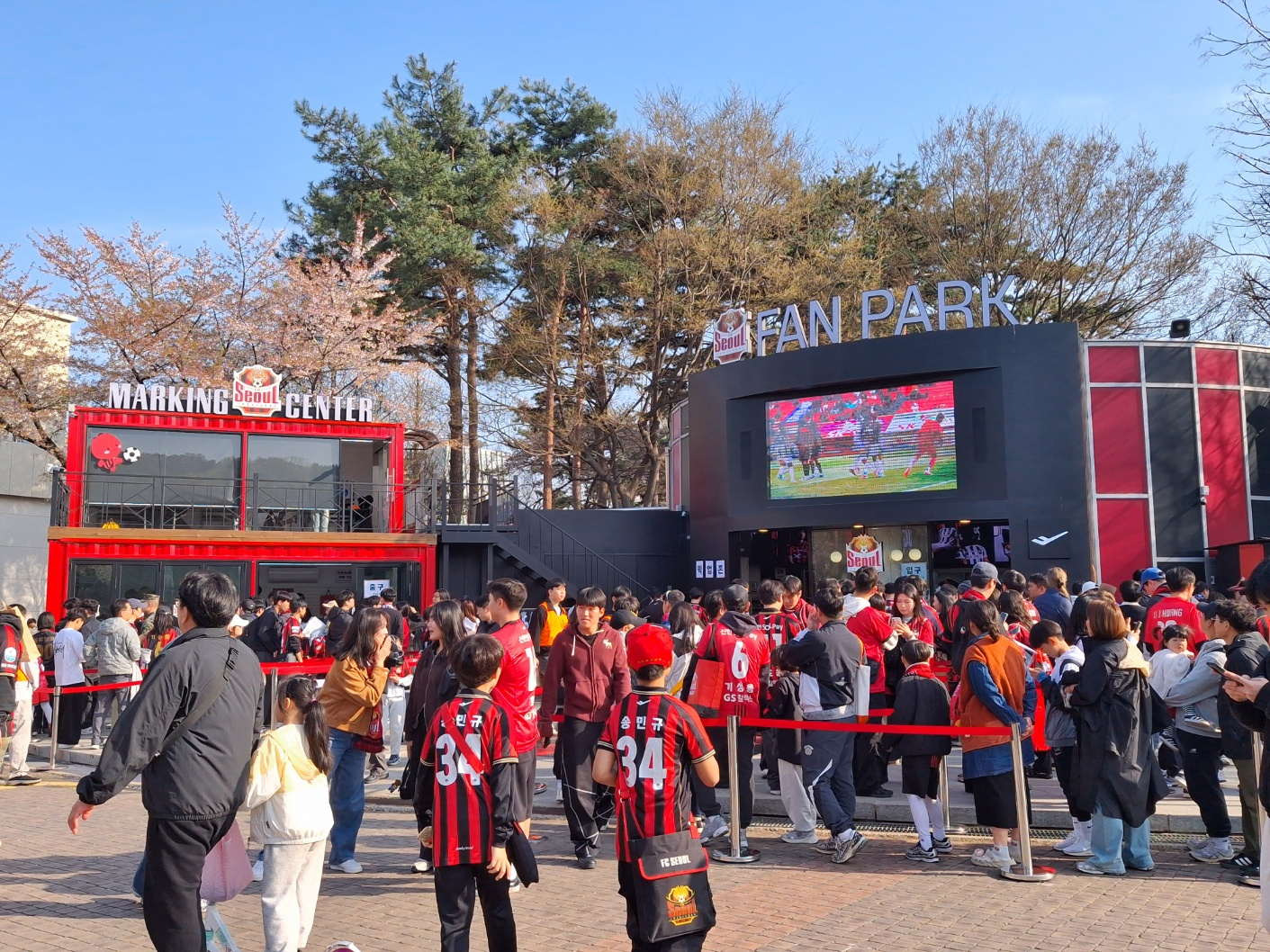
FC Seoul Fan Park, the club's official merchandise store near the Seoul World Cup Stadium

In the past, FC Seoul played at Daejeon Stadium, Cheongju Civic Stadium, Cheonan Oryong Stadium (1987–1989), Dongdaemun Stadium (1990–1995), and Anyang Stadium (1996–2003).

== Crests and mascots ==
FC Seoul has had different names, and consequently different crests for different periods of the club: Lucky-Goldstar FC (1983–1990), LG Cheetahs (1991–1995), Anyang LG Cheetahs (1996–2003).

There has also been different club mascots representing different periods. Former mascots were a bull and a cheetah. The club's current mascot, introduced in 2004, is named "SSID".

The "SSID" stands for Seoul & Sun In Dream. In the 2018 season, FC Seoul added another mascot, "Seoul-i".

A special crest for the club's 20th anniversary was used in 2003. The current crest has been used since 2004.

== Kits ==
FC Seoul's home kits have red and black stripes, as in their crest.

FC Seoul wore both red kits and yellow kits in home matches from 1984 to 1985.

From 1988 to 1994, the club's home shirt's main colour was yellow, same as the Lucky-Goldstar Group's company colour at the time.

In 1995, Lucky-Goldstar Group pushed ahead with corporate identity unification and the company colour was changed to red. As a result, FC Seoul's jersey colour was changed from yellow to red as part of the unification project.

From 1999 to 2001, FC Seoul wore red and blue stripes but returned to all red in the 2002 season and In 2005, FC Seoul changed to red and black stripes and this colour has been in use since.

In June 2016, FC Seoul released the 1984–1985 retro jersey to commemorate foundation of the club and the first K League title.

=== First kit summary ===
First kit in 1984, red version (Note: In the 1984 and 1985 seasons, the club alternated between wearing red and yellow shirts in their home matches; at that time, the club did not yet have the concept of a first and second kit.)	First kit in 1984, yellow version	The kit in 1987 was white (Note: In the 1987 season, all K League clubs wore white shirts in home matches and coloured jerseys in away matches, like in Major League Baseball.)	Between 1988 and 1994, the kits were yellow	Red kit variation in 1995	Red and blue striped shirts between 1999 and 2001	Red and black striped shirts, in use since 2005

=== Kit suppliers and shirt sponsors ===
Period	Kit supplier	Shirt sponsor	Shirt front printing	Notes
1984–1985	Bando Fashion / Pro-Specs	Lucky-Goldstar	럭키금성 / Lucky-Goldstar	Occasionally, Lucky-Goldstar wore a jersey which was manufactured by Prospecs in the 1984 season and 1985 season.
1986	Bando Fashion	Lucky-Goldstar	럭키금성 / Lucky-Goldstar	
1987–1994	Bando Fashion	GoldStar	금성VTR / GoldStar VTR, etc.	Socks were sponsored by Pro-Specs during the 1993–96 seasons.; Bando Fashion was renamed LG Fashion in September 1995.; For international matches, GoldStar Printing was written in English.
1995	Bando Fashion / LG Fashion	LG Electronics; LG Chem	LG하이비디오 / LG HIGH VIDEO, etc. 죽염치약 / Jugyeom Toothpaste, etc.	Socks were sponsored by Pro-Specs during the 1993–96 seasons.; Bando Fashion was renamed LG Fashion in September 1995.; For international matches, GoldStar Printing was written in English.
1996	LG Fashion	LG Electronics; LG Chem	LG하이비디오 / LG HIGH VIDEO, etc. 죽염치약 / Jugyeom Toothpaste, etc.	Socks were sponsored by Pro-Specs during the 1993–96 seasons.; Bando Fashion was renamed LG Fashion in September 1995.; For international matches, GoldStar Printing was written in English.
1997	Reebok	LG Information & Communications	프리웨이 / FREEWAY, etc.	Mobile phone brand
1998	Adidas	LG Electronics	LG 싸이언 / LG Cyon, etc.	Mobile phone brand
1999	Adidas	LG Electronics	디지털 LG / DIGITAL LG	LG Electronics slogan
2000	Adidas	LG Telecom	카이 / X	Mobile network operator brand
2001–2002	Adidas	LG Electronics	싸이언 / Cyon	Mobile phone brand
2003	Adidas	LG Electronics	엑스캔버스 / XCANVAS	Television brand
2004	Adidas	LG Electronics	싸이언 / Cyon	Mobile phone brand
2005–2011	Adidas	GS E&C	자이 / Xi	Apartment brand
2005–2011	Adidas	Seoul Metropolitan Government	Hi Seoul; Soul of Asia	For the 2009 AFC Champions League
2012–2013	Le Coq Sportif	GS E&C	자이 / Xi	Apartment brand
2014–2016	Le Coq Sportif	GS Shop	GS Shop	Online store brand
2017–2019	Le Coq Sportif	GS Shop	GS Shop (first kit)	Online store brand
2017–2019	Le Coq Sportif	GS Caltex	KIXX (second kit)	Filling station brand
2020	Le Coq Sportif	GS E&C	자이 / Xi (first kit)	Apartment brand
2020	Le Coq Sportif	GS Caltex	KIXX (second kit)	Filling station brand
2021	Le Coq Sportif	GS E&C	자이 / Xi (first kit)	
2021	Le Coq Sportif	GS Caltex	GS Caltex (second kit)	
2022–2027	Pro-Specs	GS E&C	자이 / Xi (first kit)	
2022–2027	Pro-Specs	GS Caltex	GS Caltex (second kit)	

=== Kit deals ===
Kit supplier	Period	Contract announcement	Contract duration	Value
Adidas	1998–2011	1998-02-10	1998–?	$200,000 per year
Adidas	1998–2011	2005-01-26	2005–2007 (3 years)	Total $3 million ($1 million per year)
Adidas	1998–2011	2008-02-25	2008–2011 (4 years)	Undisclosed
Le Coq Sportif	2012–2021	2011-12-15	2012–2015 (4 years)	Total $8 million ($2 million per year)
Le Coq Sportif	2012–2021	2016-02-17	2016–2019 (4 years)	Undisclosed
Le Coq Sportif	2012–2021	2020-01-28	2020–2021 (2 years)	Undisclosed
Pro-Specs	2022–2027	2021-12-27	2022–2024 (3 years)	Undisclosed
Pro-Specs	2022–2027	2025-02-05	2025–2027 (3 years)	Undisclosed

== Players ==
=== Current squad ===
As of November 5, 2026

Note: Flags indicate national team as defined under FIFA eligibility rules; some limited exceptions apply. Players may hold more than one non-FIFA nationality.

No.	Pos.	Nation	Player
1	GK	KOR	Lim Jun-sub
4	DF	KOR	Lee Sang-min
5	DF	JOR	Yazan Al-Arab
6	MF	CRO	Hrvoje Babec
7	MF	KOR	Jeong Seung-won
8	MF	KOR	Lee Seung-mo
9	FW	POL	Patryk Klimala
10	FW	BRA	Anderson
11	FW	COL	Leonardo Acevedo
14	FW	KOR	Jeong Hyun-woo
16	DF	KOR	Choi Jun (vice-captain)
17	DF	KOR	Ahn Jae-min
18	FW	KOR	Cho Young-wook
19	FW	KOR	Cheon Seong-hoon
20	DF	KOR	Lee Han-do (vice-captain)
21	MF	KOR	Jeong Ha-won
22	DF	KOR	Kim Jin-su (captain)
23	MF	KOR	Ko Pil-kwan
24	MF	KOR	Kim Min-joon

No.	Pos.	Nation	Player
25	GK	KOR	Gu Sung-yun
26	GK	KOR	Baek Jong-bum
27	FW	KOR	Moon Seon-min
31	GK	KOR	Kang Hyeon-mu
35	MF	KOR	Paik Sang-hoon
36	DF	KOR	Kim Ji-won
37	DF	ESP	Juan Antonio Ros
40	DF	KOR	Park Seong-hoon
41	MF	KOR	Hwang Do-yun
42	MF	KOR	Son Jeong-beom
47	FW	KOR	Jeong Hyeon-ung
49	DF	KOR	Lee Seo-hyeon
66	DF	KOR	Park Soo-il
71	GK	KOR	Yun Ki-wook
73	DF	KOR	Shin Ji-seop
77	DF	KOR	Kim Gang-joon
88	MF	KOR	Park Jang Han-gyeol
99	FW	CIV	Gbato Seloh Samuel

=== Out on loan and military service ===
Note: Flags indicate national team as defined under FIFA eligibility rules; some limited exceptions apply. Players may hold more than one non-FIFA nationality.

No.	Pos.	Nation	Player
—	DF	KOR	Bae Hyun-seo (at Gyeongnam FC)
—	DF	KOR	Cho Young-kwang (at Jeonnam Dragons)
—	DF	KOR	Ham Sun-woo (at Hwaseong FC)
—	DF	KOR	Kim Hyun-deok (at Gimhae FC 2008)

No.	Pos.	Nation	Player
—	MF	KOR	Min Ji-hoon (at Chungbuk Cheongju)
—	FW	KOR	Kang Ju-hyeok (at Gimcheon Sangmu for military service)
—	FW	BRA	Lucas Rodrigues (at Vitória)

=== Retired number(s) ===
12 – Supporters (the 12th player)
13 – Go Yo-han

=== Captains ===
Season(s)	Captain	Vice-captain(s)	Notes
1984	(South Korea) Han Moon-bae		
1985	(South Korea) Kim Kwang-hoon		
1986	(South Korea) Park Hang-seo		until September 1986
1986–1988	(South Korea) Jung Hae-seong		since September 1986
1989–1990	(South Korea) Choi Jin-han		
1991–1992	(South Korea) Lee Young-jin		
1993	(South Korea) Gu Sang-bum		
1994	(South Korea) Choi Young-jun		
1995	(South Korea) Yoon Sang-chul		until 4 August 1995
1995–1996	(South Korea) Lee Young-ik		since 5 August 1995
1997	(South Korea) Cho Byung-young		
1998	(South Korea) Kim Bong-soo		
1999	(South Korea) Kang Chun-ho		until July 1999
1999–2000	(South Korea) Choi Yong-soo		July 1999–9 May 2000
2000	(South Korea) Kim Gwi-hwa	(South Korea) Lee Young-pyo	since 10 May 2000
2001	(South Korea) Lee Sang-hun		until May 2001
2001	(South Korea) Son Hyun-jun		since May 2001
2002	(South Korea) Choi Yoon-yeol		
2003–2004	(South Korea) Kim Seong-jae		
2005–2006	(South Korea) Lee Min-sung		
2007–2008	(South Korea) Lee Eul-yong	(South Korea) Kim Chi-gon	
2009	(South Korea) Kim Chi-gon	(South Korea) Kim Jin-kyu	
2010	(South Korea) Park Yong-ho	(South Korea) Kim Jin-kyu	
2011	(South Korea) Park Yong-ho	(South Korea) Hyun Young-min	
2012–2013	(South Korea) Ha Dae-sung	(South Korea) Kim Jin-kyu	
2014	(South Korea) Kim Jin-kyu	(South Korea) Koh Myong-jin	
2015	(South Korea) Koh Myong-jin	(Spain) Osmar	until 30 April 2015
2015	(South Korea) Cha Du-ri	(Spain) Osmar	since 1 May 2015
2016	(Spain) Osmar	(South Korea) Yoo Hyun	first foreign captain
2017	(South Korea) Kwak Tae-hwi	(South Korea) Park Chu-young	
2018	(South Korea) Shin Kwang-hoon	(South Korea) Go Yo-han	until 3 July 2018
2018	(South Korea) Go Yo-han	(South Korea) Lee Woong-hee	since 4 July 2018
2019	(South Korea) Go Yo-han	(South Korea) Park Chu-young	
2020	(South Korea) Go Yo-han	(South Korea) Ju Se-jong	
2021	(South Korea) Ki Sung-yueng	(South Korea) Hwang Hyun-soo	
2022	(South Korea) Ki Sung-yueng	(South Korea) Na Sang-ho (South Korea) Yang Han-been	until 12 August 2022
2022	(South Korea) Na Sang-ho	(South Korea) Yoon Jong-gyu (South Korea) Cho Young-wook (South Korea) Kim Jin-ya (South Korea) Lee Sang-min	since 12 August 2022
2023	(Germany) Stanislav Iljutcenko	(South Korea) Han Chan-hee	Iljutcenko: until 9 May 2023; Han Chan-hee: until 21 June 2023
2023	(Spain) Osmar	(South Korea) Lim Sang-hyub (South Korea) Kim Jin-ya (South Korea) Kim Ju-sung	Osmar: since 9 May 2023
2024	(South Korea) Ki Sung-yueng	(South Korea) Cho Young-wook	
2025	(England) Jesse Lingard	(South Korea) Kim Jin-su	
2026	(South Korea) Kim Jin-su	(South Korea) Choi Jun (South Korea) Lee Han-do	

== Honours ==
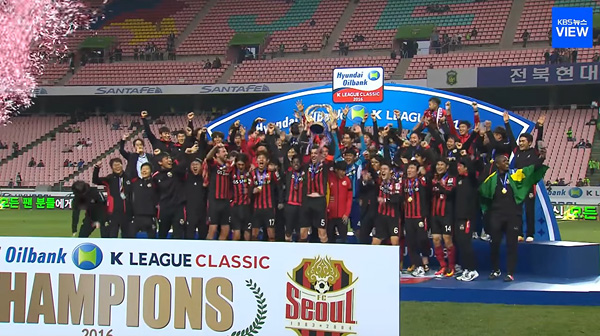
FC Seoul players celebrating after winning the 2016 K League Classic.

=== Domestic ===
- K League 1
  - Winners (7): 1985, 1990, 2000, 2010, 2012, 2016, 2026
  - Runners-up (5): 1986, 1989, 1993, 2001, 2008
- Korean FA Cup
  - Winners (2): 1998, 2015
  - Runners-up (3): 2014, 2016, 2022
- Korean League Cup
  - Winners (2): 2006, 2010
  - Runners-up (4): 1992, 1994, 1999, 2007
- Korean Super Cup
  - Winners (1): 2001
  - Runners-up (1): 1999
- Korean National Football Championship
  - Winners (1): 1988

=== Continental ===
- AFC Champions League
  - Runners-up (2): 2001–02, 2013

== Records and statistics ==
=== Season-by-season records ===
- The 1993, 1998, 1999 and 2000 seasons had penalty shoot-outs instead of draws.

Season	K League											League Cup	Korean Cup	Super Cup	ACL	Manager
Season	Division	Teams	Position	Pld	W	D	L	GF	GA	GD	Pts	League Cup	Korean Cup	Super Cup	ACL	Manager
1984	Div 1	8	7th	28	8	6	14	38	45	–7	33					(South Korea) Park Se-hak
1985	Div 1	8	Champions	21	10	7	4	35	19	+16	27					(South Korea) Park Se-hak
1986	Div 1	6	Runners-up	20	10	7	3	28	17	+11	27	5th (Pro)			Did not qualify	(South Korea) Park Se-hak
1987	Div 1	5	5th	32	7	7	18	26	55	–29	21	No competition			Withdrew	(South Korea) Park Se-hak
1988	Div 1	5	4th	24	6	11	7	22	29	–7	23	No competition	Winners (Nat'l) (Note: In 1988 and 1989, the competition was known as the National Football Championship)		Did not qualify	(South Korea) Ko Jae-wook (C)
1989	Div 1	6	Runners-up	40	15	17	8	53	40	+13	47	No competition	Semi-finals (Nat'l)		Did not qualify	(South Korea) Ko Jae-wook
1990	Div 1	6	Champions	30	14	11	5	40	25	+15	39	No competition			Did not qualify	(South Korea) Ko Jae-wook
1991	Div 1	6	6th	40	9	15	16	44	53	–9	33	No competition			Did not qualify	(South Korea) Ko Jae-wook
1992	Div 1	6	4th	30	8	13	9	30	35	–5	29	Runners-up (Ad.)			Did not enter	(South Korea) Ko Jae-wook
1993	Div 1	6	Runners-up	30	18 (10)	0 (11)	12 (9)	28	29	–1	59	4th (Ad.)			Did not qualify	(South Korea) Ko Jae-wook
1994	Div 1	7	5th	30	12	7	11	53	50	+3	43	Runners-up (Ad.)			Did not qualify	(South Korea) Cho Young-jeung
1995	Div 1	8	8th	28	5	10	13	29	43	–14	25	6th (Ad.)			Did not qualify	(South Korea) Cho Young-jeung
1996	Div 1	9	9th	32	8	8	16	44	56	–12	32	8th (Ad.)	Round of 16		Did not qualify	(South Korea) Cho Young-jeung (South Korea) Park Hang-seo (C)
1997	Div 1	10	9th	18	1	8	9	15	27	–12	11	10th (Ad.); 3rd in Group A (P)	Semi-finals		Did not qualify	(South Korea) Park Byung-joo
1998	Div 1	10	8th	18	9 (8)	0 (2)	9 (8)	28	28	0	23	Semi-finals (Ad.); 3rd (PM)	Winners		Did not qualify	(South Korea) Park Byung-joo
1999	Div 1	10	9th	27	10 (8)	0 (4)	17 (15)	38	52	–14	24	Runners-up (Ad.); 4th in Group B (D)	Semi-finals	Runners-up	Did not qualify	(South Korea) Cho Kwang-rae
2000	Div 1	10	Champions	27	19 (17)	0 (5)	8 (5)	46	25	+21	53	Semi-finals (Ad.); 5th in Group A (D)	Quarter-finals	Did not qualify	Quarter-finals (Note: In 2000, the competition was known as the 1999–2000 Asian Cup Winners' Cup)	(South Korea) Cho Kwang-rae
2001	Div 1	10	Runners-up	27	11	10	6	30	23	+7	43	4th in Group A (Ad.)	Quarter-finals	Winners	Did not qualify	(South Korea) Cho Kwang-rae
2002	Div 1	10	4th	27	11	7	9	37	30	+7	40	Semi-finals (Ad.)	Round of 32	Did not qualify	Runners-up (Note: In 2002, the competition was known as the 2001–02 Asian Club Championship)	(South Korea) Cho Kwang-rae
2003	Div 1	12	8th	44	14	14	16	69	68	+1	56	No competition	Round of 32	No competition	Did not qualify	(South Korea) Cho Kwang-rae
2004	Div 1	13	5th	24	7	12	5	20	17	+3	33	12th (Sam.)	Round of 16	Did not qualify	Did not qualify	(South Korea) Cho Kwang-rae
2005	Div 1	13	7th	24	8	8	8	37	32	+5	32	5th (Sam.)	Round of 16	Did not qualify	Did not qualify	(South Korea) Lee Jang-soo
2006	Div 1	14	4th	26	9	12	5	31	22	+9	39	Winners (Sam.)	Quarter-finals	Did not qualify	Did not qualify	(South Korea) Lee Jang-soo
2007	Div 1	14	7th	26	8	13	5	23	16	+7	37	Runners-up (Sam.)	Quarter-finals	Competition ceased	Did not qualify	(Turkey) Şenol Güneş
2008	Div 1	14	Runners-up	26	15	9	2	44	25	+19	54	3rd in Group A (Sam.)	Round of 32	Competition ceased	Did not qualify	(Turkey) Şenol Güneş
2009	Div 1	15	5th	28	16	5	7	47	27	+20	53	Semi-finals (PC)	Round of 16	Competition ceased	Quarter-finals	(Turkey) Şenol Güneş
2010	Div 1	15	Champions	28	20	2	6	58	26	+32	62	Winners (PO)	Round of 16	Competition ceased	Did not qualify	(Portugal) Nelo Vingada
2011	Div 1	16	5th	30	16	7	7	56	38	+18	55	Quarter-finals (RC)	Quarter-finals	Competition ceased	Quarter-finals	(South Korea) Hwangbo Kwan (South Korea) Choi Yong-soo (C)
2012	Div 1	16	Champions	44	29	9	6	76	42	+34	96	Competition ceased	Round of 16	Competition ceased	Did not qualify	(South Korea) Choi Yong-soo
2013	Div 1	14	4th	38	17	11	10	59	46	+13	62	Competition ceased	Quarter-finals	Competition ceased	Runners-up	(South Korea) Choi Yong-soo
2014	Div 1	12	3rd	38	15	13	10	42	28	+14	58	Competition ceased	Runners-up	Competition ceased	Semi-finals	(South Korea) Choi Yong-soo
2015	Div 1	12	4th	38	17	11	10	52	44	+8	62	Competition ceased	Winners	Competition ceased	Round of 16	(South Korea) Choi Yong-soo
2016	Div 1	12	Champions	38	21	7	10	67	46	+21	70	Competition ceased	Runners-up	Competition ceased	Semi-finals	(South Korea) Choi Yong-soo (South Korea) Hwang Sun-hong
2017	Div 1	12	5th	38	16	13	9	56	42	+14	61	Competition ceased	Round of 16	Competition ceased	Group stage	(South Korea) Hwang Sun-hong
2018	Div 1	12	11th	38	9	13	16	40	48	–8	40	Competition ceased	Round of 16	Competition ceased	Did not qualify	(South Korea) Hwang Sun-hong (South Korea) Lee Eul-yong (C) (South Korea) Choi Yong-soo
2019	Div 1	12	3rd	38	15	11	12	53	49	+4	56	Competition ceased	Round of 32	Competition ceased	Did not qualify	(South Korea) Choi Yong-soo
2020	Div 1	12	9th	27	8	5	14	23	44	–21	29	Competition ceased	Quarter-finals	Competition ceased	Group stage	(South Korea) Choi Yong-soo (South Korea) Kim Ho-young (C) (South Korea) Park Hyuk-soon (C) (South Korea) Lee Won-jun (C)
2021	Div 1	12	7th	38	12	11	15	46	46	0	47	Competition ceased	Third round	Competition ceased	Did not qualify	(South Korea) Park Jin-sub (South Korea) An Ik-soo
2022	Div 1	12	9th	38	11	13	14	43	47	–4	46	Competition ceased	Runners-up	Competition ceased	Did not qualify	(South Korea) An Ik-soo
2023	Div 1	12	7th	38	14	13	11	63	49	+14	55	Competition ceased	Third round	Competition ceased	Did not qualify	(South Korea) An Ik-soo (South Korea) Kim Jin-kyu (C)
2024	Div 1	12	4th	38	16	10	12	55	42	+13	58	Competition ceased	Quarter-final	Competition ceased	Did not qualify	(South Korea) Kim Gi-dong
2025	Div 1	12	6th	38	12	13	13	50	52	–2	49	Competition ceased	Quarter-final	Competition ceased	Round of 16	(South Korea) Kim Gi-dong

==== K League Championship records ====
Season	Teams	Position	Pld	W	D	L	GF	GA	GD	PSO	Manager
1986	2	Runners-up	2	0	1	1	1	2	–1	N/A	(South Korea) Park Se-hak
2000	4	Winners	2	1	1	0	5	2	+3	4–2 W	(South Korea) Cho Kwang-rae
2006	4	4th (semi-finals)	1	0	0	1	0	1	–1	N/A	(South Korea) Lee Jang-soo
2008	6	Runners-up	3	1	1	1	6	5	+1	N/A	(Turkey) Şenol Güneş
2009	6	5th (round of 6)	1	0	1	0	1	1	0	2–3 L	(Turkey) Şenol Güneş
2010	6	Champions	2	1	1	0	4	3	+1	N/A	(Portugal) Nelo Vingada
2011	6	5th (round of 6)	1	0	0	1	1	3	–2	N/A	(South Korea) Choi Yong-soo (C)

==== K League promotion-relegation playoffs ====
Season	Teams	Outcome	Pld	W	D	L	GF	GA	GD	PSO	Manager
2018	2	Remained	2	1	1	0	4	2	+2	N/A	(South Korea) Choi Yong-soo

=== Managerial history ===
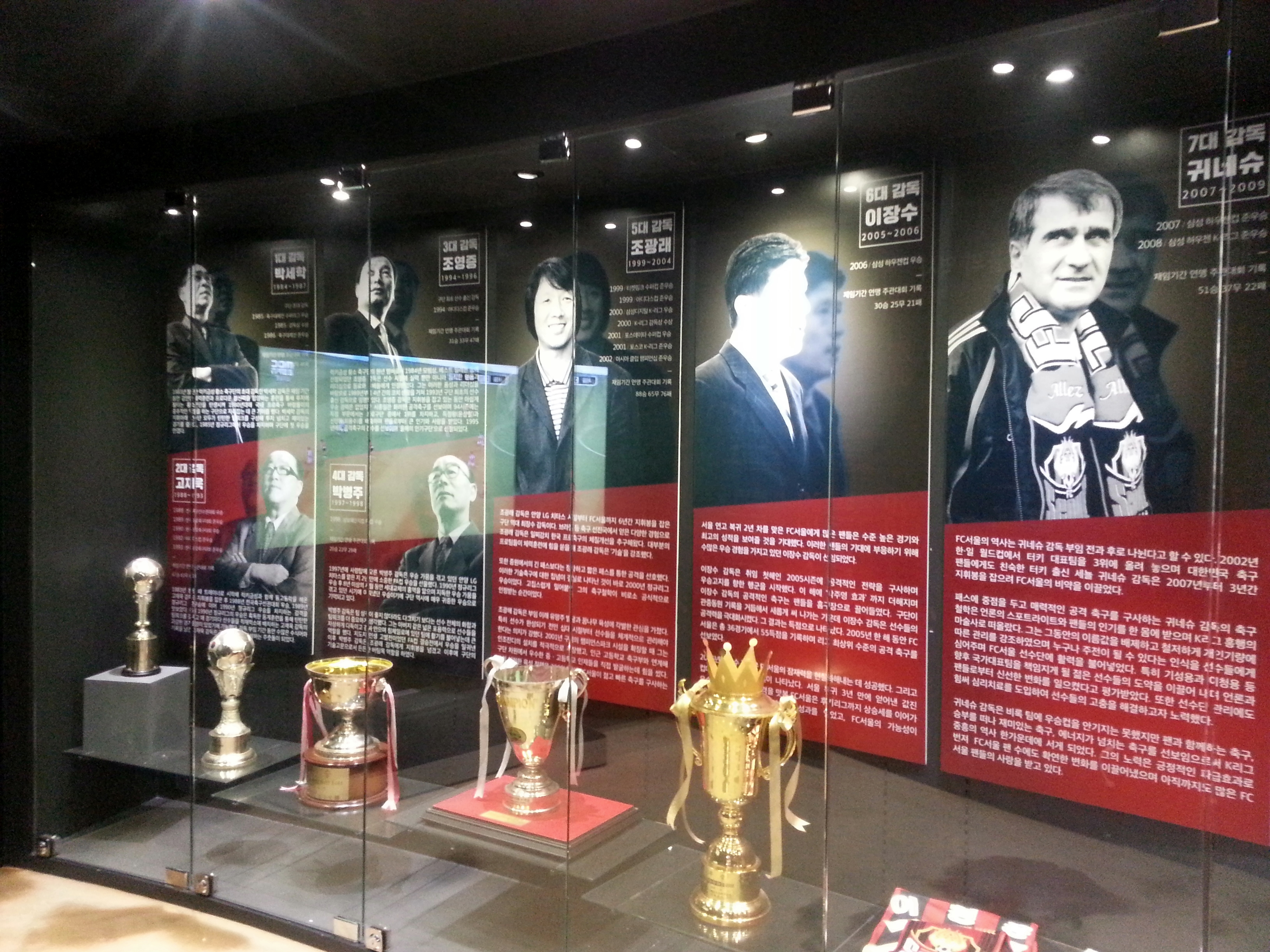
Gallery of all-time club managers at FC Seoul Fan Park

- For details on all-time manager statistics, see List of FC Seoul managers.

No.	Name	Appointed	From	To	Season(s)	Notes
1	(South Korea) Park Se-hak	1983-08-12	1983-12-22	1987-11-19	1984–1987	First manager of FC Seoul.
C	(South Korea) Ko Jae-wook	1987-12-01	1987-12-01	1988-12-26	1988	Caretaker manager in 1988, before being promoted to regular manager in 1989.
2	(South Korea) Ko Jae-wook	1988-12-27	1988-12-27	1993-12-31	1989–1993	
3	(South Korea) Cho Young-jeung	1993-11-23	1994-01-01	1996-11-05	1994–1996	First manager who was a former FC Seoul player.; First manager who resigned in the middle of season.
C	(South Korea) Park Hang-seo	1996-11-05	1996-11-05	1996-12-01	1996	Caretaker manager in FA Cup, one match in charge.
4	(South Korea) Park Byung-joo	1996-12-10	1996-12-20	1998-11-25	1997–1998	Won the first FA Cup for FC Seoul.
5	(South Korea) Cho Kwang-rae	1998-10-22	1998-12-01	2004-12-15	1999–2004	The club's longest serving manager (six seasons).
6	(South Korea) Lee Jang-soo	2004-12-30	2005-01-10	2006-12-02	2005–2006	Won the first League Cup for FC Seoul.
7	(Turkey) Şenol Güneş	2006-12-08	2007-01-08	2009-11-25	2007–2009	First foreign manager of FC Seoul.
8	(Portugal) Nelo Vingada	2009-12-14	2010-01-03	2010-12-13	2010	First (and only) manager to win the double.
9	(South Korea) Hwangbo Kwan	2010-12-28	2011-01-05	2011-04-26	2011	First manager who resigned in the middle of the league season.
C	(South Korea) Choi Yong-soo	2011-04-26	2011-04-26	2011-12-08	2011	Caretaker manager in 2011, before being promoted to regular manager in 2012.
10	(South Korea) Choi Yong-soo	2011-12-09	2011-12-09	2016-06-22	2012–2016	First manager to win K League both as a player and as a manager.
C	(South Korea) Kim Seong-jae	2016-06-23	2016-06-23	2016-06-26	2016	Caretaker manager in 2016; left after one match in charge.
11	(South Korea) Hwang Sun-hong	2016-06-21	2016-06-27	2018-04-30	2016–2018	
C	(South Korea) Lee Eul-yong	2018-04-30	2018-04-30	2018-10-11	2018	
12	(South Korea) Choi Yong-soo	2018-10-11	2018-10-11	2020-07-30	2018–2020	First manager who was appointed twice.
C	(South Korea) Kim Ho-young	2020-08-04	2020-08-04	2020-09-24	2020	
C	(South Korea) Park Hyuk-soon	2020-09-25	2020-09-25	2020-11-12	2020	
C	(South Korea) Lee Won-jun	2020-11-13	2020-11-13	2020-12-03	2020	
13	(South Korea) Park Jin-sub	2020-12-08	2020-12-08	2021-09-06	2021	
14	(South Korea) An Ik-soo	2021-09-06	2021-09-06	2023-08-22	2021–2023	
C	(South Korea) Kim Jin-kyu	2023-08-22	2023-08-22	2023-12-02	2023	
15	(South Korea) Kim Gi-dong	2023-12-14	2023-12-14		2024–	

== Management ==
=== Board of directors ===
Position	Name
Chairman	(South Korea) Huh Tae-soo
Chief executive officer	(South Korea) Yeo Eun-joo
Director	(South Korea) Yoo Seong-han

=== Chairman history ===
No.	Name	From	To	Seasons
1	(South Korea) Koo Cha-kyung	1983-08-12	1990-12-27	1984–1990
2	(South Korea) Koo Bon-moo	1990-12-28	1998-02-28	1991–1997
3	(South Korea) Huh Chang-soo	1998-03-01	2020-03-26	1998–2019
4	(South Korea) Huh Tae-soo	2020-03-26	present	2020–present

== Ownership ==
Years	Owner
November 1983–February 1991	(South Korea) Lucky-Goldstar Sports of Lucky-Goldstar Group
February 1991–May 2004	(South Korea) LG Sports of LG Group
June 2004–December 2004	(South Korea) GS Sports of LG Group
January 2005–present	(South Korea) GS Sports of GS Group

== Popular culture ==
FC Seoul and FC Seoul supporters have been portrayed in a number of Korean dramas and movies:

- Dramas: Which Star Are You From, Heading to the Ground (as a fictional team called "FC Soul"), A Thousand Kisses
- Movies: Secret Romance, Dancing Queen, Running Man, Big Match, Salut d'Amour

== See also ==
- Football in Seoul
