= Kim Ho-young =

Kim Ho-young may refer to:

- Kim Ho-young (footballer)
- Kim Ho-young (actor)
