= Huh Tae-soo =

South Korean businessman (born 1957)

Huh Tae-Soo
- Born: November 8, 1957 (age 68); Busan, South Korea
- Education: Korea University
- Occupations: Chairman of GS Group; Chairman of FC Seoul
- Family: Huh Chang-soo (brother)

Korean name
- Hangul: 허태수
- Hanja: 許兌秀
- RR: Heo Taesu
- MR: Hŏ T'aesu

Huh Tae-soo (born November 8, 1957) is the chairman of GS Group. Huh has a degree in Jurisprudence from Korea University and attended an MBA course at George Washington University in the United States.

Huh became chairman of GS Group in 2020 and he has been chairman of FC Seoul since 2020.
