= GS Group =

South Korean conglomerate

GS Holdings
- Type: Public
- Traded as: KRX: 078930
- Industry: Energy, retail, construction
- Founded: 2005; 21 years ago
- Headquarters: GS Tower, Seoul, South Korea
- Key people: Huh Tae-soo
- Owners: Huh family (50.42%)
- Website: gs.co.kr

GS Group is one of the largest South Korean conglomerates. GS comprises GS Holdings, subsidiaries & affiliates including GS Caltex, GS Retail, GS Shop, GS EPS, GS Global, GS Sports and GS E&C among others. The asset size is 65.4 trillion KRW at the end of 2019 placing GS as the 8th largest chaebol in Korea excluding the public business companies.

GS Holdings was incorporated in July 2004 and officially split from LG Group in January 2005, with the Koo family gaining full control over LG Group and the Huh family creating GS Holdings.

Convenience stores and other retail companies which formerly operated under the LG logo were rebranded as "GS", which like "LG", comes from the old name, "Lucky-Goldstar".

In December 2005, the company acquired 70% of the shares of GS EPS Co., Ltd. (formerly LG Energy Co., Ltd.) from GS E&C Corporation and LG International Corp.

In June 2026, GS Group was named alongside SK Group and Naver in a South Korean initiative to invest approximately 550 trillion won in AI data centers.

== Affiliates ==
The subsidiaries of GS Holdings are as follows:

Energy and Power

- GS Energy
- GS Caltex
- GS EPS
- GS E&R

Retail and service

- GS Retail
  - GS25
- GS Sports
  - FC Seoul
  - GS Caltex Seoul KIXX

Home Shopping & TV channel

- GS Shop/VGS Shop - VTVcab 11 & HTVC - Vietnamese Home Shopping channel (shutdown in 2024)

Construction and infrastructure

- GS Engineering & Construction
- GS Global

=== GS E&C ===
GS Engineering & Construction Corporation is a Korea-based global EPC contractor having wide range of experience in refineries, gas and petrochemical plants providing design and construction services. It has been engaged in the fields of architecture, civil engineering, building materials, housing, plant, environment, and power plant across the globe. It operates through Civil Works, Architectural Construction & Housing, Plant Construction, Power, Hotel, and other segments. In South Korea, it is also well known as an apartment developer, with its brand name being Xi.

The company has been working as an engineering-procurement-construction contractor working in the fields of oil, gas, and petrochemical projects; designs and environmental facilities (sewage system maintenance, and sewage and wastewater treatment; building industrial incineration facilities). It provides a solution for providing EPC and commissioning of thermal and combined cycle power plant projects; and combined heat power and district heating plants, as well as nuclear power projects.
