= Pro-Specs =

South Korean sportswear brand

- Industry: Athletic shoe
- Founded: 1981
- Headquarters: Seoul, South Korea
- Products: Football, Running, Tennis, Shoes, Equipment and Clothing
- Parent: LS Networks
- Website: prospecs.com

Pro-Specs (Korean: 프로스펙스) is a South Korean athletic shoe and sportswear manufacturer, which currently produces footwear and clothing for running. Its headquarters are located in Seoul. It is one of brands under LS Networks, a subsidiary of LS Group.

== History ==
Pro-Specs was created in 1981 by Kook-Je (국제상사). It was an official sponsor of the 1986 Asian Games and the 1988 Summer Olympics.

In 1985, Kook-Je was dissolved by the Chun Doo-hwan regime and the company was acquired by the Hanil Group (한일그룹). In the 1990s, the company was active in producing the tennis shoe Grand Slam and sending a volunteer team to the 1992 Summer Olympics.

In 1997, the company ran into financial difficulties during the 1997 Asian financial crisis and in 1998, Kook-Je and its parent company, Hanil Group, went bankrupt. Hanil Group was then acquired by LS Group in 2007 and renamed LS Networks in 2008.

== Sponsorships ==
=== Competition ===
- 1997 Korean League Cup

=== Baseball ===
==== Current Club teams ====
2022– : LG Twins

==== Former Club teams ====
- 1982–2001: Kia Tigers
- 1983, 1993–2000: Lotte Giants
- 1983–1984: MBC Chungyong
- 1985: Chungbo Pintos
- 1994–1996, 1998–1999: Ssangbangwool Raiders
- 2000: SK Wyverns
- 2002–2004: Hanwha Eagles

=== Basketball ===
==== Current Club teams ====
2021– : Changwon LG Sakers

==== Former Club teams ====
- 1997–2000: Wonju Dongbu Promy
- 2002–2005: Ulsan Mobis Phoebus
- 2005–2008: Incheon ET Land Elephants
- 2008–2011: Changwon LG Sakers

=== Boxing ===
- (South Korea) Oh Kwang-soo (Former)
- (South Korea) Choi Hi-yong (Former)
- (South Korea) Cho In-joo (Former)
- (South Korea) Choi Yong-soo (Former)

=== Football ===
==== Current Club teams ====
- 2021– : FC Seoul

==== Former Club teams ====
- October 1987 – 1989, 1993–1995: Pohang Steelers
- 1994–1996: Ulsan Hyundai FC
- 2000–2009: Seongnam FC

=== Volleyball ===
==== Current Club teams ====
- 2019–2025: GS Caltex Seoul KIXX

==== Former Club teams ====
- 1983–2006: Cheonan Hyundai Capital Skywalkers
- 2006–2009: Incheon Korean Air Jumbos
- 2008–2010: Gumi LIG Insurance Greaters
