= GS Caltex =

South Korean company

GS Caltex GS칼텍스
- Type: Private; Joint venture
- Industry: Oil refining, chemical manufacturing
- Founded: 1967; 59 years ago
- Headquarters: Seoul, South Korea
- Area served: Worldwide
- Key people: Huh Se-hong (CEO)
- Products: Petroleum products Aromatics; Olefin; Polymer; Lubricants; Base oil
- Revenue: KRW 58,532 billion (2022)
- Owner: GS Energy (50.0%); Chevron Corporation (50.0%)
- Website: www.gscaltex.com

GS Caltex Corporation (Korean: 지에스칼텍스 주식회사) is a South Korean energy and chemical company jointly owned in equal shares by Chevron and GS Energy, part of the GS Group. The company was founded in partnership with Caltex in May 1967 as the first private oil company in Korea. It was renamed LG-Caltex Oil Corporation in 1996, and changed its name to GS Caltex Corporation in 2005 as part of the GS Group split from LG Corporation.

By 2009, exports accounted for 54 percent of GS Caltex's sales. The company exports petroleum, petrochemical, and lubricant products to 57 countries (as of 2022).

== Operations ==
GS Caltex's refining and petrochemical plants are concentrated at the Yeosu Complex in Yeosu, South Jeolla Province, which covers about 6,000,000 m^{2}. A separate 68,100 m^{2} plant in Seo-gu, Incheon, produces lubricants and grease.

=== Petroleum ===
GS Caltex has a daily production capacity of 800,000 barrels (130,000 m^{3}) per stream day. The company operates Korea's largest heavy oil upgrading (HOU) facility (275,000 barrels (43,700 m^{3}) per day), which cracks heavy residues such as bunker C oil into gasoline, diesel and kerosene. It imports 80 types of crude oil from around 30 countries including those in the Middle East, Southeast Asia, Europe in addition to the United States and Australia.

=== Petrochemicals ===
GS Caltex constructed a polypropylene plant in 1988. That was followed by expansion into the aromatics business in 1990. It has an annual production capacity of 3.0 million tons of aromatics and 180,000 tons of polypropylene. In November 2022 the company completed an olefins plant (MFC – mixed feed cracker) near the Yeosu No. 2 Complex, at a cost of 2.7 trillion won. The plant has an annual production capacity of 900,000 tons of ethylene and 500,000 tons of polyethylene.

=== Base oil and lubricants ===
In November 2007, GS Caltex began base oil production with a capacity of 16,000 barrels (2,500 m^{3}) per stream day. It now produces 30,000 barrels (4,800 m^{3}) of base oil and 9,000 barrels (1,400 m^{3}) of lubricants per day, and exports more than 70% of its total base oil production. In 2005, GS Caltex launched its own lubricant brand, "Kixx", which covers automotive and industrial lubricants.

== See also ==
- GS Caltex Seoul KIXX
- GS Caltex Cup
- Caltex
