= Park Byung-joo =

South Korean footballer (born 1942)

Personal information
- Date of birth: 20 February 1942 (age 84)
- Place of birth: Yesan, Chūseinan-dō, Korea, Empire of Japan
- Position: Defender

Youth career
- University of Suwon

Senior career*
Years	Team	Apps	(Gls)
1965–1968	Cheil Industries FC		
1969–?	Seoul Trust Bank FC		

International career
1969–1973	South Korea	24	(0)

Managerial career
- 1976–1993: Seoul Bank FC
- 1983: Semi-Pro XI (Pestabola Merdeka)
- 1997–1998: Anyang LG Cheetahs
- 1999: Anyang LG Cheetahs (Technical advisor)
Medal record
Representing South Korea
Men's football
Asian Games
Gold medal – first place	1970 Bangkok	Team
- * Club domestic league appearances and goals

- Park Byung-joo
- Hangul: 박병주
- Hanja: 朴炳柱
- RR: Bak Byeongju
- MR: Pak Pyŏngju

Park Byung-joo (born 20 February 1942) is a South Korea former football player and manager.

== International career ==
Between 1969 and 1973, he was a member of the South Korea national football team.

== Managerial career ==
After retirement as a player, he returned to Seoul Bank FC as a manager. Under his guidance the Korea Seoul Bank FC became a strong team in the semi-professional league. He was particularly famous for his late football career. He started his football career during military service.

In 1993, he became a commentator on a sports magazine, but he returned to the K League as a manager of FC Seoul, then known as Anyang LG Cheetahs in December 1997. When he was manager, FC Seoul won the FA Cup in 1998. He retired in December 1998 and was appointed to technical advisor in 1999.

== Honours ==
Managerial

- Anyang LG Cheetahs
  - FA Cup : 1998
