= Lee Min-sung =

South Korean footballer and coach

Personal information
- Full name: Lee Min-sung
- Date of birth: June 23, 1973 (age 53)
- Place of birth: Gwangmyeong, Gyeonggi, South Korea
- Height: 1.82 m (6 ft 0 in)
- Position: Centre-back

College career
Years	Team	Apps	(Gls)
1992–1995	Ajou University		

Senior career*
Years	Team	Apps	(Gls)
1996–2002	Busan I'Cons	77	(6)
1999–2001	→ Sangmu FC (draft)		
2003–2004	Pohang Steelers	62	(2)
2005–2008	FC Seoul	65	(0)
2010	Yongin City		

International career
1994–1995	South Korea U23	8	(0)
1995–2004	South Korea	67	(2)

Managerial career
- 2015–2016: Ulsan Hyundai (assistant)
- 2018–2020: South Korea U23 (assistant)
- 2021–2024: Daejeon Hana Citizen
- 2024–2026: South Korea U23
Medal record
Men's football
Representing South Korea (as player)
AFC Asian Cup
Bronze medal – third place	2000 Lebanon
Representing South Korea (as manager)
Asian Games
Gold medal – first place	2026 Aichi–Nagoya
- * Club domestic league appearances and goals

- Lee Min-sung
- Hangul: 이민성
- Hanja: 李敏成
- RR: I Minseong
- MR: I Minsŏng

Lee Min-sung (Korean: 이민성; born 23 June 1973) is a South Korean football manager and former player. He played for the South Korea national team at the 1998 and 2002 FIFA World Cups.

== Club career ==
After graduating from Ajou University in 1996, Lee joined K League club Busan Daewoo Royals (renamed Busan I'Cons in 2000). In 1997, he helped Busan win three domestic titles, namely K League, Adidas Cup and Pro-Specs Cup.

Lee was known as a centre-back while playing for Busan and the national team, but played as a striker for military football club Sangmu FC, where he did compulsory military service from 1999 to 2001. After moving to another K League club Pohang Steelers in 2003, he changed his position to defensive midfielder.

In January 2005, Lee signed for the same league's FC Seoul on a free transfer. Under manager Lee Jang-soo, he captained Seoul as soon as he joined the team, and led them to win the 2006 Korean League Cup. In 2007, he handed over the armband to Lee Eul-yong, and suffered a cruciate ligament injury in a league match against Gyeongnam FC on 4 April. In November 2008, he committed a hit and run while driving under the influence of alcohol. In March 2009, he announced his retirement as a professional player.

In 2010, Lee played as a player-coach for Korea National League club Yongin City.

== International career ==
During the 1995 Lunar New Year Cup, Lee made his international debut in a 1–0 win over Colombia. On 28 September 1997, he became famous for scoring the winning goal with a long-range shot in a FIFA World Cup qualifier against historical rivals Japan, which ended in a 2–1 win. He was selected for the South Korea squad for the 1998 FIFA World Cup, playing three Group E matches as a starter. He was also named in the squad for the 2002 FIFA World Cup, playing the semi-final match against Germany and the third place match against Turkey.

== Coaching career ==
After working as a coach of Yongin City until 2011, Lee received an offer from Lee Jang-soo, his mentor at FC Seoul and then manager of Chinese Super League club Guangzhou Evergrande. He joined Guangzhou as a coach and reserve team manager in January 2012, and left the club when Lee Jang-soo was replaced by Marcello Lippi in May.

Lee moved to Gangwon FC in July and Jeonnam Dragons in January 2013, continuing his coaching career at the K League. In January 2015, he became an assistant coach to Ulsan Hyundai manager Yoon Jong-hwan.

In May 2016, Lee left Ulsan for Changchun Yatai, a Chinese club managed by Lee Jang-soo. He worked as a coach of Changchun until Lee Jang-soo resigned from the team in April 2017.

In March 2018, Lee was appointed assistant coach of the South Korea national under-23 team by manager Kim Hak-bum, his boss at Gangwon. He helped the team win the 2018 Asian Games and the 2020 AFC U-23 Championship. In May 2019, he was shortlisted for the India national team manager before India chose Igor Štimac.

== Managerial career ==
=== Daejeon Hana Citizen ===
In December 2020, Lee was appointed manager of K League 2 club Daejeon Hana Citizen. Under him, Daejeon finished third in the 2021 regular season, qualifying for the promotion play-offs. His team drew with Jeonnam Dragons without a goal in the first round of the play-offs, and advanced to the second round thanks to a higher rank in the regular season standings. After a 3–1 win over FC Anyang in the second round, they faced second bottom of the 2021 K League 1, Gangwon FC, in the two-legged final. They failed to promote to the K League 1 by losing 4–2 on aggregate in the final.

In 2022, Lee's team finished runners-up in the regular season, advancing to the final round of the promotion play-offs. They succeeded in promoting to the first division this time by defeating Gimcheon Sangmu 6–1 on aggregate. Daejeon extended their contract with him after the play-offs.

In 2023, newly-promoted Daejeon finished eighth out of 12 K League 1 teams, and once again renewed their contract with Lee. The next season, however, his team earned only two wins in the first 13 matches, staying at the bottom of the league. In May 2024, he voluntarily resigned from Daejeon due to his poor results.

=== South Korea U23 ===
In May 2025, Lee rejoined South Korea under-23s as manager. In June, he played his first two friendlies against Australia, bringing a goalless draw and a 2–0 loss. His team won all three AFC U-23 Asian Cup qualifiers in September, whereas they lost 6–0 on aggregate in two friendlies against Saudi Arabia in October. During the 2025 Panda Cup, a friendly competition held by China in November, his team defeated Uzbekistan and Vietnam, but suffered a shock 2–0 loss to China. Although he won the competition, his results against Saudi Arabia and China caused controversy among South Korean fans.

During the 2026 AFC U-23 Asian Cup, South Korea advanced to the quarter-finals following a 0–0 draw with Iran, a 4–2 win over Lebanon and a 2–0 loss to Uzbekistan in the group stage. Afterwards, they defeated Australia 2–1 in the quarter-finals, and lost 1–0 to Japan in the semi-finals. While getting inconsistent results continuously, they met Vietnam in the third place match. Against Vietnam, they suffered a shock 2–2 draw, and moreover, lost 7–6 in the penalty shoot-out. He was originally going to manage the team until the 2028 Summer Olympics, but his contract period was reduced until the 2026 Asian Games after the match.

On 9 June, Lee's 1–0 friendly loss to Kyrgyzstan, which finished the match with 10 players, once again worried the South Korean press, which warned that the under-23 team "may be able to have a disaster" in the future. However, he led South Korea to win the 2026 Asian Games, where they won all five matches against Saudi Arabia, Qatar, Vietnam, China and hosts Japan.

== Career statistics ==
=== International ===
Results list South Korea's goal tally first.

List of international goals scored by Lee Min-sung
No.	Date	Venue	Opponent	Score	Result	Competition
1	28 September 1997	Tokyo, Japan	Japan	2–1	2–1	1998 FIFA World Cup qualification
2	17 February 2000	Los Angeles, United States	Costa Rica	2–1	2–2	2000 CONCACAF Gold Cup

== Honours ==
Busan Daewoo Royals

- K League 1: 1997
- Korean League Cup: 1997, 1997+, 1998+

Sangmu FC

- Korean National Semipro League (Autumn): 1999
- Korean National Semipro Championship: 1999

FC Seoul

- Korean League Cup: 2006

South Korea

- AFC Asian Cup third place: 2000

Individual

- K League All-Star: 1997, 1998, 2001, 2002, 2003, 2004

=== Manager ===
South Korea U23

- Asian Games: 2026

Sporting positions
Preceded by Kim Seong-jae	FC Seoul captain 2005–2006	Succeeded by Lee Eul-yong
