= Kim Chi-gon =

South Korean footballer (born 1983)

Personal information
- Full name: Kim Chi-gon
- Date of birth: July 29, 1983 (age 43)
- Place of birth: Busan, South Korea
- Height: 1.83 m (6 ft 0 in)
- Position: Defender

Youth career
- Ajou University

Senior career*
Years	Team	Apps	(Gls)
2002–2009	Anyang LG Cheetahs / FC Seoul	148	(2)
2010–2017	Ulsan Hyundai	156	(9)
2011–2012	→ Sangju Sangmu (military service)	41	(1)
2018	Sarawak	15	(0)

International career^{‡}
2002–2003	South Korea U-20	18	(0)
2003–2006	South Korea U-23	23	(0)
2004–2009	South Korea	9	(0)
- * Club domestic league appearances and goals as of 26 June 2018 ‡ National team caps and goals as of 2 February 2009

- Kim Chi-gon
- Hangul: 김치곤
- Hanja: 金致坤
- RR: Gim Chigon
- MR: Kim Ch'igon

Kim Chi-gon (born 29 July 1983) is a South Korean football former player who last played as a defender for Sarawak in Malaysia Premier League.

He was part of the South Korea football team in 2004 Olympic, who finished second in Group A, making it through to the next round, before being defeated by silver medal winners Paraguay. He also capped for South Korea U-20 football team at 2003 FIFA World Youth Championship.

== Club career statistics ==
Club performance			League		Cup		League Cup		Continental		Total	
Season	Club	League	Apps	Goals	Apps	Goals	Apps	Goals	Apps	Goals	Apps	Goals
South Korea			League		KFA Cup		League Cup		Asia		Total	
2002	Anyang LG Cheetahs	K-League	14	1	1	0	0	0	?	0	15+?	1
2003	Anyang LG Cheetahs	K-League	20	0	0	0	-		-		20	0
2004	FC Seoul	K-League	19	0	2	0	0	0	-		21	0
2005	FC Seoul	K-League	15	0	2	0	5	0	-		22	0
2006	FC Seoul	K-League	14	0	2	0	10	0	-		26	0
2007	FC Seoul	K-League	24	0	3	1	9	1	-		36	2
2008	FC Seoul	K-League	24	0	1	0	6	0	-		31	0
2009	FC Seoul	K-League	18	1	1	1	4	0	6	0	29	2
2010	Ulsan Hyundai	K-League	28	0	2	0	5	0	-		35	0
2011	Sangju Sangmu Phoenix	K-League	18	0	0	0	1	0	-		19	0
Career total			194	2	13	2	35	1	6	0	248	5

== Honours ==
=== FC Seoul ===
- 2002 Asian Club Championship Runners-up
- 2006 League Cup Champion
- 2007 League Cup Runners-up
- 2008 K-League Runners-up

Sporting positions
Preceded by Lee Eul-Yong	FC Seoul captain 2009	Succeeded by Park Yong-Ho
Preceded by Kim Jung-Woo	Sangju Sangmu Phoenix captain 2011–2012	Succeeded by Unknown
