= Huh Chang-soo =

South Korean billionaire (born 1948)

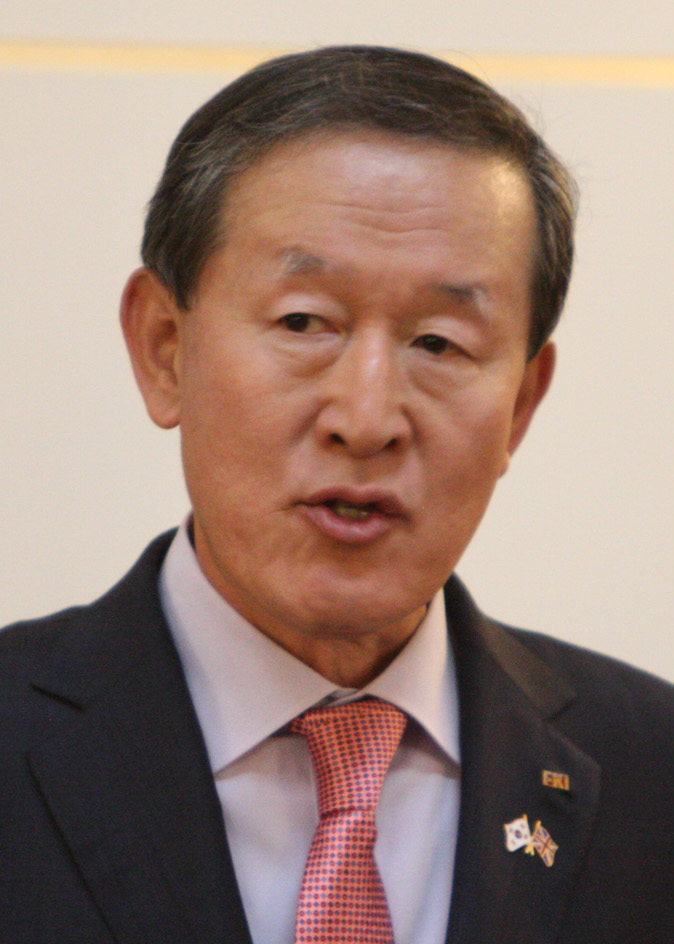
- Born: October 6, 1948 (age 77); Jinju, South Korea
- Education: Korea University
- Occupations: Chairman of GS Group; Chairman of FC Seoul
- Family: Huh Tae-soo (brother)

Korean name
- Hangul: 허창수
- Hanja: 許昌秀
- RR: Heo Changsu
- MR: Hŏ Ch'angsu

Huh Chang-soo (Korean: 허창수; born October 6, 1948) is the chairman of GS Group. Huh has a degree in business administration from Korea University and attended an MBA course at Saint Louis University in the United States.

Huh became chairman of GS Group in 2004 and he has been chairman of FC Seoul since 1998. He is notorious among football fans for being stingy and refusing to spend money on transfers despite FC Seoul being one of the richest teams in Korea.
