= Lee Eul-yong =

South Korean footballer

Personal information
- Date of birth: 12 October 1975 (age 51)
- Place of birth: Taebaek, Gangwon, South Korea
- Height: 1.76 m (5 ft 9 in)
- Position: Midfielder

Youth career
- 1991–1993: Gangneung Commerce High School

Senior career*
Years	Team	Apps	(Gls)
1995	Korea Railroad		
1996–1997	Sangmu FC (draft)		
1998–2003	Bucheon SK	90	(11)
2002–2003	→ Trabzonspor (loan)	19	(0)
2003–2004	FC Seoul	27	(0)
2004–2006	Trabzonspor	55	(1)
2006–2008	FC Seoul	57	(0)
2009–2011	Gangwon FC	58	(1)
Total		306	(13)

International career
1999–2006	South Korea	51	(3)

Managerial career
- 2018: FC Seoul (caretaker)
- 2019: Jeju United (assistant)
- 2025: Gyeongnam FC
Medal record
Men's football
Representing South Korea
EAFF Championship
Winner	2003 Japan
- * Club domestic league appearances and goals

- Lee Eul-yong
- Hangul: 이을용
- Hanja: 李乙容
- RR: I Eulyong
- MR: I Ŭryong

Lee Eul-yong (Korean: 이을용; born 12 October 1975) is a South Korean football manager and former player. He played as a midfielder for the South Korea national team at the 2002 and 2006 FIFA World Cups.

== Early life ==
Lee was born in Taebaek, Gangwon, and attended high school in Gangneung. He continued his football career during his school days, but he failed to join a university football club. He stopped playing football for a while before receiving an offer to join semi-professional club Korea Railroad.

== International career ==
Lee was part of the South Korean national team in the 2002 FIFA World Cup. Noted for his accurate kicks including free-kicks, he provided two assists against Poland and the United States, and scored a free-kick against Turkey. After the World Cup, he transferred to Trabzonspor with the help of Tınaz Tırpan.

In September 2006, after a match against Chinese Taipei, Lee announced that he would retire from the national team to focus on FC Seoul and also to make way for younger players in the upcoming 2010 FIFA World Cup.

== Personal life ==
=== Internet meme ===
Lee is well known by most South Koreans and other Asian football fans for a famous incident which is sometimes referred as "Eul-yong Ta (을용타)," and roughly translated as 'Eul-yong Strike/Smash'. The incident occurred during a match against China in the inaugural East Asian Cup in December 2003.

During the second half of the game, Chinese forward Li Yi kicked Lee in the shins immediately after he finished his pass. Visually upset with Li's violent play, Lee slapped Li on the back of his head. Li Yi started rolling on the pitch grabbing his head in an apparent exaggeration. For a while the entire Chinese and Korean squad ran toward the scene but further conflict did not occur, as the referee awarded a yellow card for Li and red card for Lee. Korea defeated China in the match, and Lee became the source of a popular internet meme after the incident.

=== Family ===
Lee's sons Tae-seok and Seung-joon also became footballers. His first son Tae-seok played for South Korea at the 2026 FIFA World Cup.

== Career statistics ==
=== Club ===
As of 23 October 2011

Appearances and goals by club, season and competition
Club	Season	League			National cup		League cup		Continental		Total	
Club	Season	Division	Apps	Goals	Apps	Goals	Apps	Goals	Apps	Goals	Apps	Goals
Korea Railroad	1995	National Semipro League	?	?	?	?	?	?	—		?	?
Sangmu FC (draft)	1996	National Semipro League	?	?	?	?	?	?	—		?	?
Sangmu FC (draft)	1997	National Semipro League	?	?	?	?	?	?	—		?	?
Sangmu FC (draft)	Total		?	?	?	?	?	?	—		?	?
Bucheon SK	1998	K League	14	3	2	0	19	0	—		35	3
Bucheon SK	1999	K League	17	1	3	0	8	0	—		28	1
Bucheon SK	2000	K League	27	5	3	0	10	0	—		40	5
Bucheon SK	2001	K League	26	2	1	0	0	0	—		27	2
Bucheon SK	2002	K League	6	0	0	0	1	0	—		7	0
Bucheon SK	Total		90	11	9	0	38	0	—		137	11
Trabzonspor (loan)	2002–03	Süper Lig	19	0	2	0	—		—		21	0
FC Seoul	2003	K League	17	0	1	0	—		—		18	0
FC Seoul	2004	K League	10	0	0	0	0	0	—		10	0
FC Seoul	Total		27	0	1	0	0	0	—		28	0
Trabzonspor	2004–05	Süper Lig	26	0	3	0	—		3	0	32	0
Trabzonspor	2005–06	Süper Lig	29	1	3	0	—		2	0	34	1
Trabzonspor	Total		55	1	6	0	—		5	0	66	1
FC Seoul	2006	K League	14	0	2	0	0	0	—		16	0
FC Seoul	2007	K League	22	0	2	0	8	1	—		32	1
FC Seoul	2008	K League	21	0	0	0	9	0	—		30	0
FC Seoul	Total		57	0	4	0	17	1	—		78	1
Gangwon FC	2009	K League	22	0	1	0	2	0	—		25	0
Gangwon FC	2010	K League	17	0	0	0	0	0	—		17	0
Gangwon FC	2011	K League	19	1	2	0	1	0	—		22	1
Gangwon FC	Total		58	1	3	0	3	0	—		64	1
Career total			306	13	25	0	58	1	5	0	394	14

=== International ===
Results list South Korea's goal tally first.

List of international goals scored by Lee Eul-yong
No.	Date	Venue	Opponent	Score	Result	Competition
1	29 June 2002	Daegu, South Korea	Turkey	1–1	2–3	2002 FIFA World Cup
2	29 September 2003	Incheon, South Korea	Nepal	8–0	16–0	2004 AFC Asian Cup qualification
3	4 June 2006	Edinburgh, Scotland	Ghana	1–1	1–3	Friendly

== Filmography ==
=== Television ===
Year	Title	Role	Note(s)	Ref.
2015	Cheongchun FC Hungry Eleven	Himself		
2020	We Can Game	Himself		
2022	Gundesliga	Himself		
2022–present	Kick a Goal Season 3	Himself		

== Honours ==
=== Player ===
Sangmu FC

- Korean National Semipro League (Autumn): 1996, 1997
- Korean National Championship: 1996

Bucheon SK

- Korean League Cup: 2000+

Trabzonspor

- Turkish Cup: 2003

FC Seoul

- Korean League Cup runner-up: 2007

South Korea

- EAFF Championship: 2003

Individual

- K League All-Star: 2001, 2003, 2004

=== Television personality ===
List of awards and nominations received by TV personality Lee Eul-yong
Award ceremony	Year	Category	Nominated work	Result	Ref.
SBS Entertainment Awards	2022	Leader of the Year Award (Note: Shared with Ha Seok-ju, Kim Byung-ji, Kim Tae-young, Choi Jin-cheul, Choi Sung-yong, Hyun Young-min, Lee Young-pyo, Oh Beom-seok, Cho Jae-jin and Baek Ji-hoon)	Kick a Goal	Won	

Sporting positions
Preceded by Lee Min-sung	FC Seoul captain 2007–2008	Succeeded by Kim Chi-gon
Preceded by Inaugural	Gangwon FC captain 2009	Succeeded by Chung Kyung-ho
Preceded by Seo Dong-hyun	Gangwon FC captain 2011	Succeeded by Kim Eun-jung
