= Kim Ho-young (footballer) =

South Korean footballer and manager

Kim Ho-young 김호영
Personal information
- Full name: Kim Ho-young
- Date of birth: October 29, 1969 (age 57)
- Place of birth: South Korea
- Height: 1.71 m (5 ft 7 in)
- Position: Midfielder

Team information
- Current team: Gwangju FC

Youth career
- 1987–1990: Dongguk University

Senior career*
| Years | Team | Apps | (Gls) |
| 1991–1995 | Ilhwa Chunma | 24 | (1) |
| 1996–1999 | Jeonbuk Hyundai Dinos | 54 | (12) |

Managerial career
- 2002–2003: South Korea U-17 (assistant manager)
- 2004–2005: South Korea U-20 (coach)
- 2006: FC Seoul (coach)
- 2007–2008: FC Seoul Reserves (coach)
- 2010–2012: Guangzhou Evergrande F.C. (assistant manager)
- 2013: Gangwon FC
- 2015–2016: Dongguk University
- 2020: FC Seoul (assistant manager)
- 2020: FC Seoul (caretaker manager)
- 2021–: Gwangju FC
- * Club domestic league appearances and goals

- Kim Ho-young
- Hangul: 김호영
- Hanja: 金浩永
- RR: Gim Hoyeong
- MR: Kim Hoyŏng

Kim Ho-young (Korean: 김호영, born. October 29, 1969, in South Korea) is a South Korean football manager and former player. He is currently the manager of Gwangju FC.

His name was Kim Yong-kab but he changed name to Kim Ho-young.

== Club career ==
He played in the K League for the Ilhwa Chunma and Jeonbuk Hyundai Dinos.
