= List of FC Seoul players =

FC Seoul is an association football club based in Seoul, South Korea. The club was founded in 1983 under the name Lucky-Goldstar FC. Since 1984, Seoul has been competing in the K League 1, the highest level of football in South Korea. Seoul is one of the most successful clubs in the country, having won seven K League 1 titles, two Korean FA Cups, two Korean League Cups and one Korean Super Cup.

FC Seoul's one-club men Go Yo-han is the club's all-time most capped player in official competitions with 446 appearances.

== Players ==
The list below includes all FC Seoul players who have made at least 100 official appearances for the club or who have been capped at full international level by their countries. Former captains, individual award winners or club record holders are also included.

The list is initially ordered by the career period. For the list of the club's active players, see FC Seoul's current squad. Caps and goals in the table below are updated as of the end of the 2025 season, which ended in December 2025.

Table headers

- Nationality – If a player played international football, the country/countries he played for are shown. Otherwise, the player's nationality is given as their country of birth.
- Position – Playing position of the player (goalkeeper (GK), defender (DF), midfielder (MF), forward (FW), and utility player (U))
- Club career – The year of the player's first appearance for FC Seoul to the year of his last appearance.
- Appearances – The number of games played. Includes appearances in K League, K League Championship, K League promotion-relegation playoffs, Korean League Cup, Korean FA Cup, Asian Cup Winners' Cup and AFC Champions League.

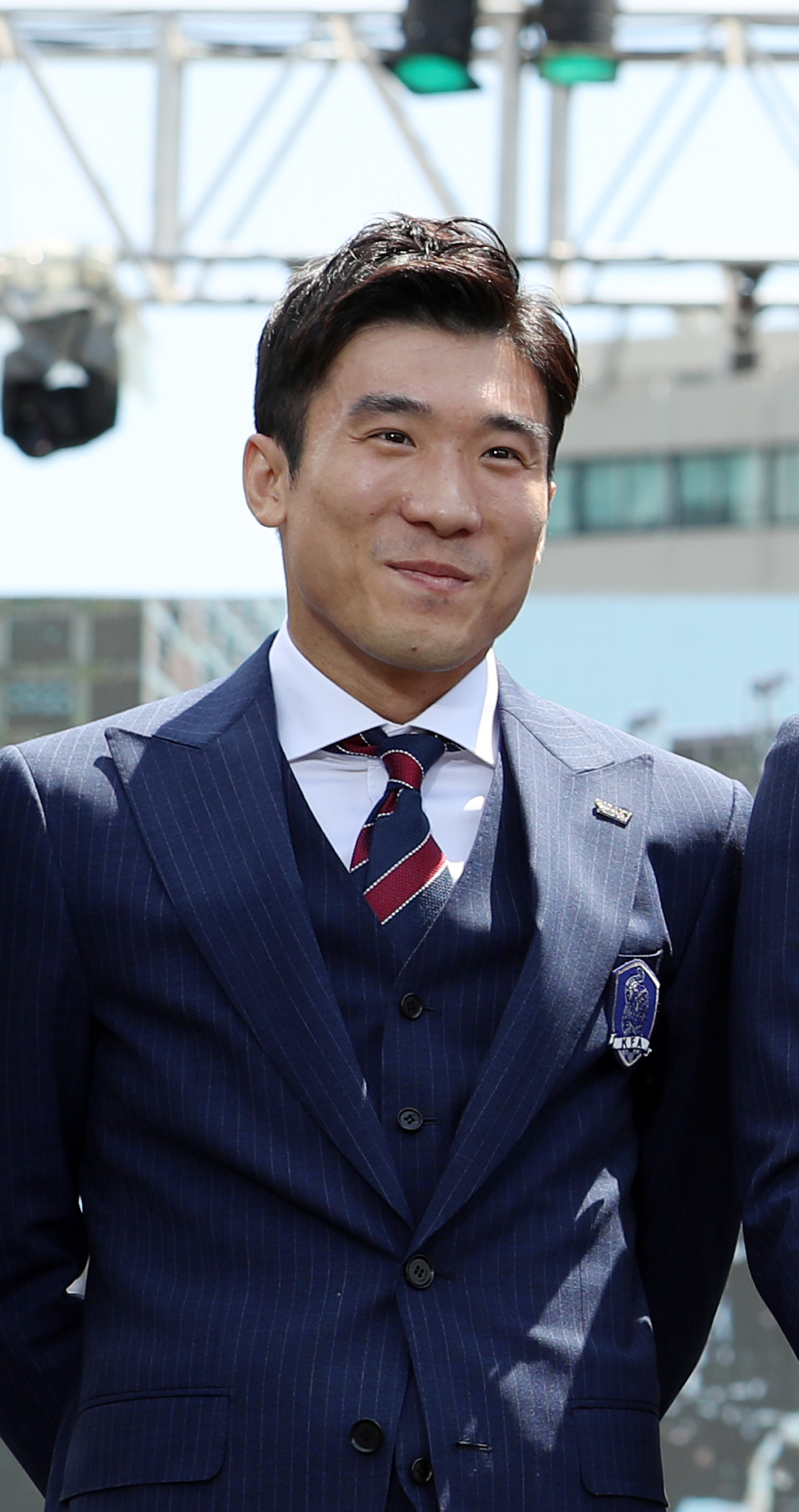
Go Yo-han is the most-capped FC Seoul player with 446 official appearances.

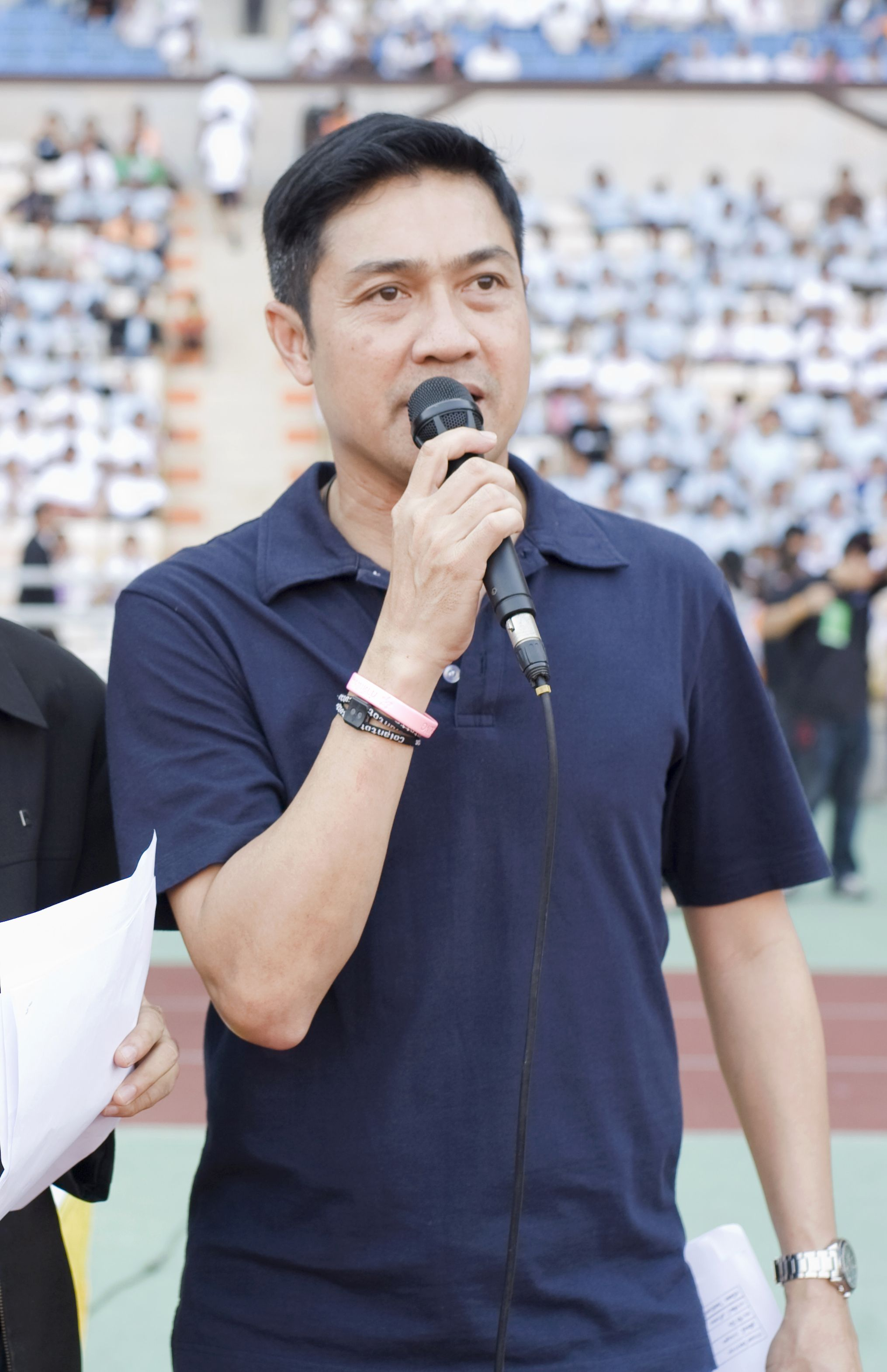
Piyapong Pue-on was the first foreign FC Seoul player.

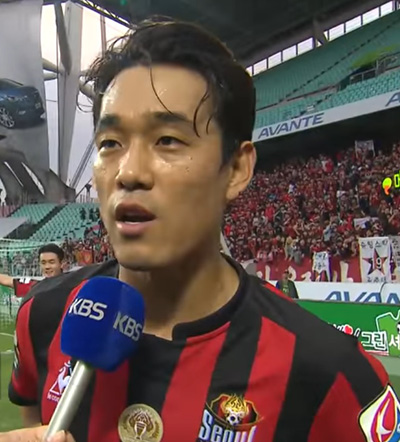
Park Chu-young has made over 300 appearances for the club; he was selected in the K League Classic Best XI in 2005.

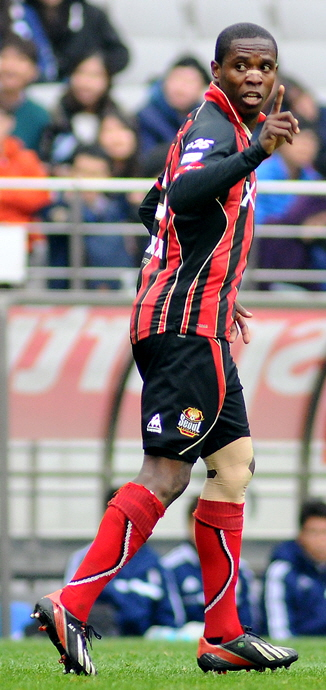
Adilson dos Santos is the fifth most capped FC Seoul player, gaining 305 appearances in eight seasons with the club.

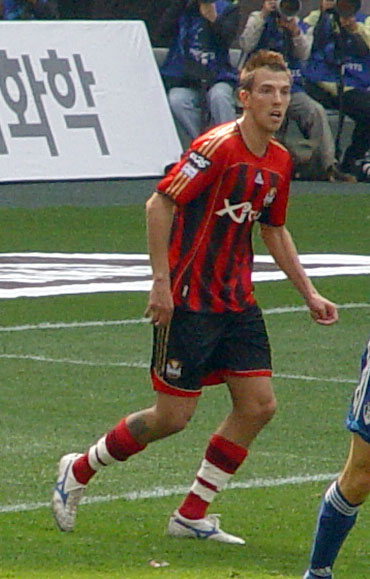
Dejan Damjanović is the club's all-time top goalscorer in official matches.

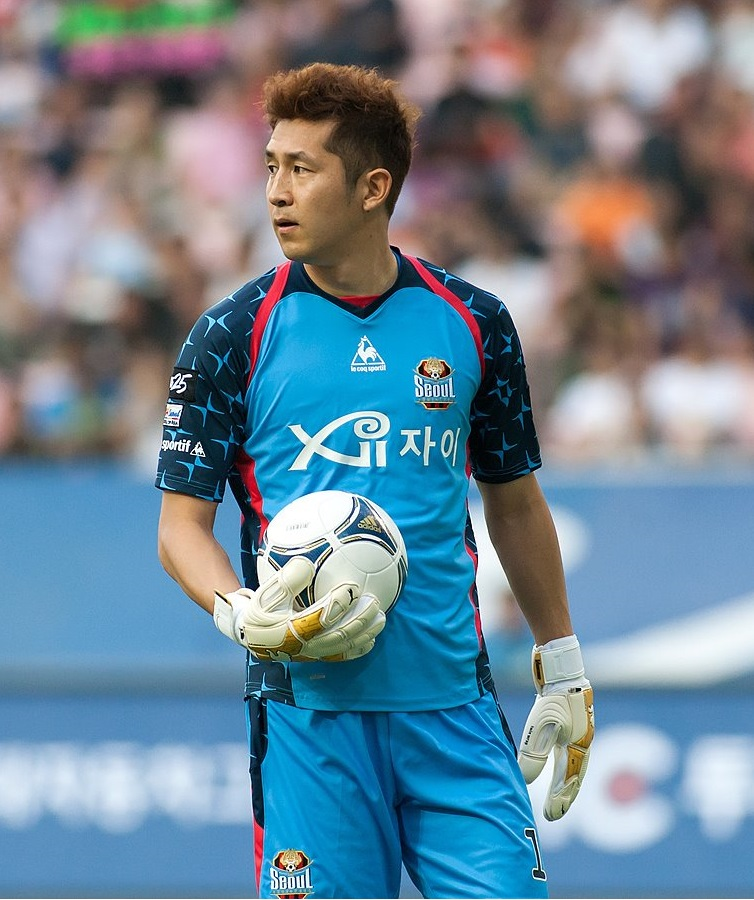
Kim Yong-dae holds the record for the most appearances among the club's goalkeepers.

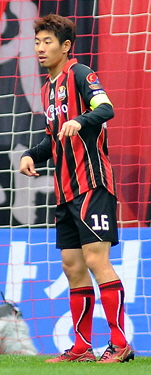
Ha Dae-sung captained FC Seoul in both matches of the 2013 AFC Champions League final.

Key
The player has been capped at full international level for the country
Club record

List of Seoul players, and displaying the types of accomplishments and statistics by the players during their time with the club
Name	Nationality	Pos	Club career	Apps	Goals	Notes
Park Byung-chul	South Korea	MF	1984	16	0	
Kim Kwang-hoon	South Korea	DF	1984–1985	36	0	(Note: Captain of the club in 1985.)
Han Moon-bae	South Korea	MF	1984–1986	75	7	
Piyapong Pue-on	Thailand	FW	1984–1986	48	13	
Cho Young-jeung	South Korea	DF	1984–1987	52	14	
Park Hang-seo	South Korea	MF	1984–1988	115	20	
Jung Hae-seong	South Korea	DF	1984–1989	118	2	
Kang Deuk-soo	South Korea	MF	1984–1989	139	20	
Kim Hyun-tae	South Korea	GK	1984–1991; 1994; 1996–1997	114	0	
Wang Sun-jae	South Korea	FW	1985–1986	21	1	
Lee Boo-yeol	South Korea	MF	1985–1988	68	2	
Choi Jin-han	South Korea	MF	1985–1991	151	21	
Cha Sang-kwang	South Korea	GK	1986–1991; 1995	149	0	
Cho Min-kook	South Korea	U	1986–1992	139	15	
Gu Sang-bum	South Korea	DF	1986–1993	158	15	
Lee Young-jin	South Korea	MF	1986–1995; 1997	220	11	
Jang Jung	South Korea	DF	1987–1988	33	0	
Choi Soon-ho	South Korea	FW	1988–1990	28	2	
Kim Sam-soo	South Korea	MF	1988–1993	108	4	
Choi Young-jun	South Korea	DF	1988–1994	177	3	
Cho Byung-young	South Korea	DF	1988–1997	179	3	
Yoon Sang-chul	South Korea	FW	1988–1997	301	101	
Choi Tae-jin	South Korea	DF	1989–1992	106	8	
Kim Dong-hae	South Korea	MF	1989–1995	129	9	
Lee Young-ik	South Korea	DF	1989–1997	191	6	
Lee In-jae	South Korea	FW	1989–1997	138	12	
Park Jung-bae	South Korea	DF	1990–1993	111	9	
Choi Dae-shik	South Korea	MF	1990–1995	166	8	
Arsenio Luzardo	Uruguay	MF	1992–1993	18	3	
Lim Keun-jae	South Korea	FW	1992–1994	85	18	
Park Chul-woo	South Korea	GK	1992–1994	62	0	
Seo Jung-won	South Korea	MF	1992–1997	88	26	
Kim Bong-soo	South Korea	GK	1992–1999	113	0	
Kim Pan-keun	South Korea	DF	1994–1997	104	2	
Kang Chun-ho	South Korea	DF	1994–2001	140	3	
Choi Yong-soo	South Korea	FW	1994–1996; 1999–2000; 2006	154	60	
Jeaustin Campos	Costa Rica	MF	1995–1996	19	2	
Abbas Obeid Jassim	Iraq	MF	1996–1997	36	4	
Kim Dae-sung	South Korea	MF	1995–1999	153	10	
Volodymyr Savchenko	Ukraine	GK	1996	24	0	
Sadiq Saadoun Abdul-Ridha	Iraq	DF	1996	32	2	
Serhiy Skachenko	Ukraine	FW	1996–1997	52	18	
Gilbert Massock	Cameroon	FW	1997	4	0	
Ajibade Babalade	Nigeria	DF	1997	4	0	
Victor Shaka	Nigeria	FW	1997–1999	71	15	
Oleg Elyshev	Russia	FW	1997–1999	94	17	(Note: Top assist maker of the 1997 League Cup.)
Mutamba Kabongo	(Democratic Republic of the Congo) DR Congo	DF	1997–2000	120	9	
Kim Gwi-hwa	South Korea	MF	1998–2000	99	3	
Jung Kwang-min	South Korea	MF	1998–2002; 2007	157	36	
Kim Sung-il	South Korea	DF	1998–2003	143+?	0	
Lee Sang-hun	South Korea	DF	1998–2003	81+?	3	
Jukka Koskinen	Finland	DF/MF	1999	14	0	
Ēriks Pelcis	Latvia	FW	1999–2000	23	4	
Wang Jung-hyun	South Korea	DF	1999–2004	126+?	19	
Kim Seong-jae	South Korea	MF	1999–2005	216	13	
Lee Young-pyo	South Korea	DF	2000–2002	81	3	
Choi Yoon-yeol	South Korea	DF	2000–2002	61+?	0	
Andre	Brazil	MF	2000–2002	105	21	
Choi Tae-uk	South Korea	MF	2000–2003; 2010–2013	192	14	
Valeri Sarychev	Tajikistan	GK	2000–2004	136	0	(Note: Also holds South Korean citizenship under the name Shin Eui-son.)
Ricardo	Brazil	MF	2000–2004	159+?	24	
Kim Dong-jin	South Korea	DF	2000–2006; 2011	147	14	
Choi Won-kwon	South Korea	DF	2000–2008	177+?	3	
Park Yong-ho	South Korea	DF	2000–2004; 2007–2011	185+?	8	
Vitaliy Parakhnevych	Tajikistan	FW	2001	9	2	(Note: Dual citizenship of Ukraine and Tajikistan; internationally capped for Tajikistan.)
Lee Jung-soo	South Korea	DF	2002–2004	33+?	2	
Park Yo-seb	South Korea	MF	2002–2004; 2007–2008	68+?	4	
Kim Chi-gon	South Korea	DF	2002–2009	200	5	
Masakiyo Maezono	Japan	MF	2003	16	0	
Grafite	Brazil	FW	2003	9	0	
Lee Eul-yong	South Korea	MF	2003–2004; 2006–2008	106	1	
Song Jin-hyung	South Korea	MF	2003–2007; 2017–2020	26	1	
Jung Jo-gook	South Korea	FW	2003–2010; 2012; 2014–2015	266	84	
Koh Myong-jin	South Korea	MF	2003–2015	283	18	
Go Yo-han	South Korea	MF	2004–2023	446	40	
Renaldo	Brazil	FW	2004	11	1	
Kim Eun-jung	South Korea	FW	2004–2008	139	41	
Lee Chung-yong	South Korea	MF	2004–2009	78	12	
Han Tae-you	South Korea	MF	2004–2006; 2008–2014	161	5	
Baek Ji-hoon	South Korea	MF	2005–2006	38	3	
Lee Ki-hyung	South Korea	DF	2005–2006	37	0	
Ricardo Nascimento	Portugal	MF	2005–2007	76	8	(Note: Top assist maker of the 2006 K League.)
Kwak Tae-hwi	South Korea	DF	2005–2007; 2016–2018	118	5	
Lee Min-sung	South Korea	DF/MF	2005–2008	92	0	
Park Chu-young	South Korea	FW	2005–2008; 2015–2021	314	90	
Kim Byung-ji	South Korea	GK	2006–2008	91	0	
Ki Sung-yueng	South Korea	MF	2006–2009; 2020–2025	235	17	
Kim Han-yoon	South Korea	MF	2006–2010	145	1	
Adilson dos Santos	Brazil	MF/DF	2006–2013	305	20	
Kim Jin-kyu	South Korea	DF	2007–2010; 2012–2015	270	16	
Ceyhun Eriş	Turkey	MF	2008	8	1	
Lee Jong-min	South Korea	DF	2008–2010; 2012	36	1	
Lee Seung-yeoul	South Korea	MF	2008–2011	114	24	
Dejan Damjanović	Montenegro	FW	2008–2013; 2016–2017	330	184	
Kim Chi-woo	South Korea	MF	2008–2010; 2012–2017	231	14	
Server Djeparov	Uzbekistan	MF	2010–2011	40	2	
Hyun Young-min	South Korea	DF	2010–2013	92	4	
Ha Dae-sung	South Korea	MF	2010–2013; 2017–2019	164	26	
Choi Hyo-jin	South Korea	DF	2010–2014	93	4	
Kim Yong-dae	South Korea	GK	2010–2015	222	0	
Mauricio Molina	Colombia	MF	2011–2015	205	24	
Kim Ju-young	South Korea	DF	2012–2014	125	5	
Sergio Escudero	Japan	FW	2012–2015	118	20	(Note: Triple citizenship of Argentina, Spain and Japan; internationally capped for Japan.)
Cha Du-ri	South Korea	DF	2013–2015	114	2	
Yun Il-lok	South Korea	FW	2013–2017	190	33	
Osmar	Spain	MF/DF	2014–2023	344	25	
Adriano	Brazil	FW	2015–2016; 2020	71	45	(Note: Top scorer of the 2016 AFC Champions League and the 2016 Korean FA Cup, and selected in the K League Classic Best XI in 2015 and 2016.)
Yojiro Takahagi	Japan	MF	2015–2016	62	5	
Ju Se-jong	South Korea	MF	2016–2020	114	7	
Cho Chan-ho	South Korea	MF	2016–2017	31	0	
Jung In-whan	South Korea	DF	2016–2017	20	0	
Shin Kwang-hoon	South Korea	DF	2017–2018	42	0	
Lee Myung-joo	South Korea	MF	2017–2019	23	3	
Yoon Jong-gyu	South Korea	DF	2017–2024	136	2	
Kim Sung-joon	South Korea	MF	2018	11	1	
Yun Suk-young	South Korea	DF	2018	25	1	
Cho Young-wook	South Korea	FW	2018–	229	37	
Alibaev Ikromjon	Uzbekistan	MF	2019–2021	50	4	
Aleksandar Pešić	Serbia	FW	2019–2020	27	10	
Kim Ju-sung	South Korea	DF	2019–2025	123	2	
Na Sang-ho	South Korea	FW	2021–2023	109	30	
Aleksandar Paločević	Serbia	MF	2021–2026	138	23	
Ji Dong-won	South Korea	FW	2021–2023	26	2	
Kang Seong-jin	South Korea	FW	2021–	92	9	
Ben Halloran	Australia	MF	2022	2	0	
Hwang In-beom	South Korea	MF	2022	10	0	
Stanislav Iljutcenko	Germany	FW	2022–2024	82	26	(Note: Captain of the club in 2023.)
Lim Sang-hyub	South Korea	MF	2023–2024	54	6	
Hosam Aiesh	Syria	MF	2023	3	0	
Hwang Ui-jo	South Korea	FW	2023	18	4	
Bjørn Maars Johnsen	Norway	FW	2023	9	1	
Jesse Lingard	England	FW	2024–2025	67	19	
Rebin Sulaka	Iraq	DF	2024	4	0	
Kang Sang-woo	South Korea	DF	2024	37	1	
Yazan Al-Arab	Jordan	DF	2024–	52	1	
Kim Jin-su	South Korea	DF	2025–	42	2	
Moon Seon-min	South Korea	MF	2025–	43	6	
Choi Jun	South Korea	DF	2024–	76	3	
Jeong Seung-won	South Korea	MF	2025–	40	3	

== See also ==
- List of FC Seoul award winners
- List of FC Seoul records and statistics
