= List of FC Seoul award winners =

This is a list of award winners for the FC Seoul

== Club ==
=== Domestic Awards ===
==== K League Best Team Award ====
#	Year	Award Descriptions	Notes
1	2010	Received most weekly best team award in 2010 season	
2	2012	Received most weekly best team award in 2012 season	

==== K League Fair Play Team Award ====
#	Year	Award Descriptions	Notes
1	2011	Took lowest number of red cards, yellow cards, disciplinary of all clubs	
2	2013	Took lowest number of red cards, yellow cards, disciplinary of all clubs	
2	2014	Took lowest number of red cards, yellow cards, disciplinary of all clubs	

==== K League Full Stadium Award ====
#	Year	Award Descriptions	Notes
1	2012	Gathering most spectators	

==== K League Achievement award ====
#	Year	Award Descriptions	Notes
1	2007	Most attendance record (55,3970)	

==== K League Youth Club Expanding Award ====
#	Year	Award Descriptions	Notes
1	2014		

==== FA Cup Fair Play Team Award ====
#	Year	Award Descriptions	Notes
1	2014		

=== International Awards ===
==== Most Organized Club ====
#	Year	Award Descriptions	Notes
1	2009	In all clubs of 2009 AFC Champions League, FC Seoul was most organized home matches.	

==== AFC Champions League Fair Play Award ====
#	Year	Award Descriptions	Notes
1	2013	Took lowest number of red cards, yellow cards, disciplinary of all clubs	

== Individual ==
=== Coaching staff ===
==== Domestic Awards ====
===== K League Manager of the Year Award =====
#	Year	Manager	Notes
1	1985	(South Korea) Park Se-Hak	
2	1990	(South Korea) Ko Jae-Wook	
3	2000	(South Korea) Cho Kwang-Rae	
4	2012	(South Korea) Choi Yong-Soo	

===== National Football Championship Coaching Staff Award =====
#	Year	Coaching Staff	Notes
1	1988	(South Korea) Ko Jae-wook Caretaker Manager, (South Korea) Cho Young-jeung	

===== FA Cup Coaching Staff Award =====
#	Year	Coaching Staff	Notes
1	1998	(South Korea) Park Byung-joo Manager, | (South Korea) Lee Chun-seok Coach	

==== International Awards ====
===== AFC Coach of the Year =====
#	Year	Coach	Notes
1	2013	(South Korea) Choi Yong-Soo	

=== Player ===
==== Domestic Awards ====
===== K League MVP Award =====
#	Year	Player	Position	Notes
1	1985	(South Korea) Han Moon-Bae	Midfielder	
2	1990	(South Korea) Choi Jin-Han	Midfielder	
3	2000	(South Korea) Choi Yong-Soo	Forward	
4	2012	(South Korea) Dejan Damjanović	Forward	

===== K League Regular Season Top Scorer Award =====
#	Year	Player	Position	Goals	Matches	Goals per Match	Notes
1	1985	(Thailand) Piyapong Pue-on	Forward	12	21	0.57	
2	1990	(South Korea) Yoon Sang-Chul	Forward	12	30	0.40	
3	1992	(South Korea) Lim Keun-Jae	Forward	10	30	0.33	
4	1994	(South Korea) Yoon Sang-Chul	Forward	21	28	0.75	
5	2011	(South Korea) Dejan Damjanović	Forward	23	29	0.79	
6	2012	(South Korea) Dejan Damjanović	Forward	42	31	0.74	
7	2013	(South Korea) Dejan Damjanović	Forward	19	29	0.66	

===== K League Regular Season Top Assists Award =====
#	Year	Player	Position	Assists	Matches	Assists per Match	Notes
1	1985	(Thailand) Piyapong Pue-on	Forward	6	21	0.29	
2	1986	(South Korea) Kang Deuk-Soo	Midfielder	8	15	0.53	
3	1990	(South Korea) Choi Dae-Shik	Midfielder	7	29	0.24	
4	1993	(South Korea) Yoon Sang-Chul	Forward	8	27	0.30	
5	2000	(Brazil) Andre	Midfielder	10	29	0.34	
6	2005	(Portugal) Ricardo Nascimento	Midfielder	9	16	0.56	
7	2012	(Colombia) Mauricio Molina	Midfielder	9	16	0.56	
8	2013	(Colombia) Mauricio Molina	Midfielder	13	35	0.37	

===== K League Best XI =====
Year	Goalkeeper	Defenders	Midfielders	Forwards	Sum	Notes
1984			(South Korea) Cho Young-Jeung		1	
1985	(South Korea) Kim Hyeon-Tae	(South Korea) Han Moon-Bae	(South Korea) Park Hang-Seo	(Thailand) Piyapong Pue-on (South Korea) Kang Deuk-Soo	5	
1986	(South Korea) Kim Hyeon-Tae	(South Korea) Cho Young-Jeung	(South Korea) Cho Min-Kook		3	
1987		(South Korea) Gu Sang-Bum			1	
1988			(South Korea) Choi Jin-Han		1	
1989	(South Korea) Cha Sang-Kwang	(South Korea) Lee Young-Ik		(South Korea) Yoon Sang-Chul	3	
1990		(South Korea) Choi Young-jun (South Korea) Choi Tae-Jin	(South Korea) Choi Jin-Han (South Korea) Choi Dae-Shik	(South Korea) Yoon Sang-Chul	5	
1991		(South Korea) Lee Young-jin			1	
1992		(South Korea) Park Jung-bae		(South Korea) Lim Keun-Jae	2	
1993			(South Korea) Kim Dong-Hae	(South Korea) Yoon Sang-Chul	2	
1994				(South Korea) Yoon Sang-Chul	1	
1995			(South Korea) Kim Pan-Keun		1	
2000	(South Korea) Shin Eui-Son		(Brazil) Andre	(South Korea) Choi Yong-Soo	3	
2001	(South Korea) Shin Eui-Son	(South Korea) Lee Young-Pyo			2	
2002			(Brazil) Andre		1	
2004			(South Korea) Kim Dong-Jin		1	
2005				(South Korea) Park Chu-Young	1	
2006				(South Korea) Kim Eun-Jung	1	
2007	(South Korea) Kim Byung-Ji	(Brazil) Adilson dos Santos			2	
2008		(Brazil) Adilson dos Santos	(South Korea) Lee Chung-Yong (South Korea) Ki Sung-Yueng		3	
2009			(South Korea) Ki Sung-Yueng		1	
2010	(South Korea) Kim Yong-Dae	(Brazil) Adilson dos Santos (South Korea) Choi Hyo-Jin		(Montenegro) Dejan Damjanović	4	
2011			(South Korea) Ha Dae-Sung	(Montenegro) Dejan Damjanović	2	
2012	(South Korea) Kim Yong-Dae	(Brazil) Adilson dos Santos	(Colombia) Mauricio Molina (South Korea) Ha Dae-Sung	(Montenegro) Dejan Damjanović	5	
2013		(Brazil) Adilson dos Santos	(South Korea) Ha Dae-Sung	(Montenegro) Dejan Damjanović	3	
2014		(South Korea) Cha Du-Ri, (South Korea) Kim Ju-Young	(South Korea) Koh Myong-Jin		3	
Total					58	

===== K League Rookie of the Year Award =====
#	Year	Player	Position	Notes
1	1994	(South Korea) Choi Yong-Soo	Forward	
2	2003	(South Korea) Jung Jo-Gook	Forward	
3	2005	(South Korea) Park Chu-Young	Forward	
4	2008	(South Korea) Lee Seung-Yeoul	Forward	

===== K League 'FAN'tastic Player =====
#	Year	Player	Position	Notes
1	2012	(South Korea) Dejan Damjanović	Forward	

===== K League Best GK Award =====
#	Year	Player	Notes
1	1985	(South Korea) Kim Hyun-tae	
2	1986	(South Korea) Kim Hyun-tae	
3	1989	(South Korea) Cha Sang-Kwang	

- Best GK Award was finally awarded in 1994 season

===== K League Fair Player Award =====
#	Year	Player	Notes
1	1984	(South Korea) Cho Young-Jeung	

- Fair Player Award was finally awarded in 1994 season

===== K League Honorable Mention =====
#	Year	Player	Notes
1	1988	(South Korea) Choi Jin-Han	
2	1990	(South Korea) Choi Tae-Jin	
3	1993	(South Korea) Yoon Sang-Chul	

- Honorable Mention Award was finally awarded in 1994 season

===== League Cup Top Scorer Award =====
#	Year	Player	Position	Goals	Matches	Goals per Match	Notes
1	1997	(South Korea) Seo Jung-Won	Forward	8	9	0.89	
2	2010	(Montenegro) Dejan Damjanović	Forward	6	7	0.86	

===== League Cup Top Assists Award =====
#	Year	Player	Position	Assists	Matches	Assists per Match	Notes
1	1997	(Russia) Oleg Elyshev	Midfielder	5	7	0.71	
2	2002	(Brazil) Andre	Midfielder	4	9	0.44	
3	2007	(South Korea) Lee Chung-Yong	Midfielder	5	8	0.63	

===== R League MVP Award =====
#	Year	Player	Position	Notes
1	2002	(South Korea) Park Dong-Suk	Goalkeeper	
2	2004	(South Korea) Han Dong-Won	Forward	

===== R League Top Scorer Award =====
#	Year	Player	Position	Goals	Matches	Goals per Match	Notes
1	1990	(South Korea) Kim Dong-Hae	Midfielder	7	?	?	
2	2000	(South Korea) Wang Jung-Hyun	Forward	8	8	1.00	
3	2005	(South Korea) Han Dong-Won	Forward	10	20	0.50	

===== National Football Championship MVP Award =====
#	Year	Player	Position	Notes
1	1988	(South Korea) Cho Min-kook	Defender	

===== National Football Championship Best GK Award =====
#	Year	Player	Notes
1	1988	(South Korea) Kim Hyun-tae	

===== National Football Championship Best 11 =====
#	Year	Goalkeeper	Defenders	Midfielders	Forwards	Sum	Notes
1	1988	(South Korea) Kim Hyun-tae	(South Korea) Cho Min-kook (South Korea) Gu Sang-bum	(South Korea) Choi Jin-han		4	
Total						4	

===== FA Cup MVP Award =====
#	Year	Player	Position	Notes
1	1998	(South Korea) Kang Chun-Ho	Defender	

===== FA Cup Top Scorer Award =====
#	Year	Player	Position	Goals	Matches	Goals per Match	Notes
1	1999	(South Korea) Choi Yong-Soo	Forward	5	3	1.67	
2	2004	(South Korea) Jung Jo-Gook	Forward	5	2	2.50	
3	2004	(South Korea) Wang Jung-Hyun	Forward	5	2	2.50	

===== Korea Football Association Fair Play Award =====
#	Year	Player	Position	Notes
1	2015	(South Korea) Sim Sang-min	Defender	

===== Korean Fair Play Committee Fair Play Award =====
#	Year	Player	Position	Notes
1	2016	(South Korea) Sim Sang-min	Defender	

==== International Awards ====
===== AFC Youth Player of the Year =====
#	Year	Player	Position	Notes
1	2009	(South Korea) Ki Sung-Yueng	Midfielder	

===== AFC Champions League Dream Team =====
#	Year	Substitute	Goalkeeper	Defenders	Midfielders	Forwards	Sum	Notes
1	2013	(South Korea) Kim Jin-kyu (DF) (South Korea) Ha Dae-Sung (MF)	(South Korea) Kim Yong-dae			(Montenegro) Dejan Damjanović	4	
2	2014	(South Korea) Cha Du-ri (DF) (South Korea) Kim Ju-young (DF) (South Korea) Yun Il-lok (MF)					3	
Total							7	

== FC Seoul 'FAN AWARDS' ==
Season	Most Valuable Player	Most Memorable Player	Fantastic Goal of the Year	Dramatic Goal of the Year	Save of the Year	Match of the Year	Note
2013	(Montenegro) 데얀		(South Korea) 하대성 칩슛골 vs (Iran) 에스테글랄 (2013-10-03)	(Montenegro) 데얀 동점골 vs (China) 광저우 헝다 (2013-10-26)	(South Korea) 김용대 페널티킥 세이브 vs (South Korea) 제주 유나이티드 (2013-07-31)	vs (South Korea) 강원 FC (2013-04-28)	
2014	(South Korea) 차두리		(South Korea) 이상협 중거리슛 골 vs (South Korea) 인천 유나이티드 (2014-08-16)	(South Korea) 고요한 라스트 미닛 골 vs (South Korea) 수원 삼성 블루윙즈 (2014-11-09)	(South Korea) 유상훈 승부차기 3연속 선방 vs (South Korea) 포항 스틸러스 (2014-08-27)	vs (South Korea) 제주 유나이티드 (2013-14-30)	
2015	(Spain) 오스마르	(South Korea) 윤주태	(South Korea) 차두리 폭풍질주 골 vs (South Korea) 수원 삼성 블루윙즈 (2015-09-19)	(Colombia) 몰리나 라스트 미닛 골 vs (Japan) 가시마 앤틀러스 (2015-05-05)	(Spain) 오스바르 슈퍼 클리어링 vs (South Korea) 전북 현대 모터스 (2015-10-25)	vs (South Korea) 수원 삼성 블루윙즈 (2015-09-19)	
2016	(Spain) Osmar Barba	(South Korea) Ju Se-jong					
2017							

== See also ==
- FC Seoul
- FC Seoul records and statistics
- K League MVP Award
- K League Rookie of the Year Award
- K League Top Scorer Award
- K League Top Assistor Award
- K League Manager of the Year Award
