= 1990 Ilhwa Chunma season =

Ilhwa Chunma
1990 season
- Chairman: Park Kyu-Nam
- Manager: Park Jong-Hwan
- KPFL: 6th
- Top goalscorer: Kim Yong-Se (7 goals)
- Highest home attendance: 13,000
- Lowest home attendance: 500

1990 Korean Professional Football League was the second season for Ilhwa Chunma. They finished the season at the bottom of the league table.

== Staff ==
=== Coaching staff ===
- Manager : (South Korea) Park Jong-Hwan
- Coach : (South Korea) Won Hong-Jae
- Trainer : (South Korea) Lee Jang-Soo
- Team Physician : (South Korea) Lee Sang-Don

== Squad ==
Note: Flags indicate national team as defined under FIFA eligibility rules; some limited exceptions apply. Players may hold more than one non-FIFA nationality.

Pos.	Nation	Player
GK	KOR	Kim Young-Ho
GK	KOR	Na Chi-Seon
GK	ROU	Marcel Lăzăreanu
DF	KOR	Kim Kyung-Bum
DF	KOR	Moon Won-Geun
DF	KOR	Lim Jong-Heon
DF	KOR	Jung Young-Ho
DF	KOR	Bang In-Woong
DF	KOR	Kim Jae-So
DF	KOR	Han Yeon-Su
DF	KOR	Kim Ki-Wan
MF	KOR	Kim Hyun-Seok
MF	KOR	Choi Chung-Il
MF	KOR	Kim Young-Joo

Pos.	Nation	Player
MF	KOR	Lee Sang-Yoon
MF	KOR	Park Jong-Dae
MF	KOR	Park Sang-Rok
MF	KOR	Ha Sung-Jun
MF	KOR	Oh Dong-Cheon
MF	KOR	Ahn Ik-Soo
MF	KOR	Park Doo-Heung
FW	KOR	Yoo Seung-Gwan
FW	KOR	Ko Jeong-Woon
FW	KOR	Baek Jong-Chul
FW	KOR	Kim Yong-Se
FW	KOR	Kim I-Ju
FW	KOR	Son Woong-Jung

== Season results ==
=== KPFL table ===
Pos	Team	Pld	W	D	L	GF	GA	GD	Pts
2	Daewoo Royals	30	12	11	7	30	25	+5	35
3	POSCO Atoms	30	9	10	11	29	28	+1	28
4	Yukong Elephants	30	8	12	10	27	30	−3	28
5	Hyundai Horang-i	30	6	14	10	32	38	−6	26
6	Ilhwa Chunma	30	7	10	13	28	40	−12	24

Source: RSSSF

=== Personal awards ===
Best XI : Lim Jong-Heon

== Matches ==
17 March 1990 KPFL	Ilhwa Chunma	0–1	Hyundai Horang-i	Jeju Stadium, Jeju
			Byun Byung-Joo 10'	Attendance: 5,000; Referee: Park Hee-Cha-Rang

24 March 1990 KPFL	Ilhwa Chunma	2–0	Daewoo Royals	Masan Stadium, Masan
	Kim Yong-Se 56' 79'			Attendance: 5,000; Referee: Kim In-Soo

31 March 1990 KPFL	Lucky-Goldstar Hwangso	3–1	Ilhwa Chunma	Gumi Civil Stadium, Gumi
	Choi Jin-Han 52', Yoon Sang-Chul 55', Choi Young-Jun 76'		Lee Sang-Yoon 22'	Attendance: 22,000; Referee: Choi Chang-Seon

5 April 1990 KPFL	Yukong Elephants	1–0	Ilhwa Chunma	Anyang Stadium, Anyang
	Noh Soo-Jin 11'			Attendance: 10,000; Referee: Park Hee-Cha-Rang

8 April 1990 KPFL	Ilhwa Chunma	0–0	POSCO Atoms	Masan Stadium, Masan
				Attendance: 13,000; Referee: Kil Ki-Chul

14 April 1990 KPFL	Hyundai Horang-i	0–1	Ilhwa Chunma	Ulsan Complex Stadium, Ulsan
			Kim Young-Joo 25'	Attendance: 8,000; Referee: Park Hwa-Deok

22 April 1990 KPFL	Yukong Elephants	1–0	Ilhwa Chunma	Pyeongtaek Stadium, Pyeongtaek
	OG(Ahn Ik-Soo) 68'			Attendance: 5,000; Referee: Choi Chang-Seon

28 April 1990 KPFL	Ilhwa Chunma	1–1	Lucky-Goldstar Hwangso	Dongdaemun Stadium, Seoul
	Ko Jeong-Woon 53'		Choi Tae-Jin 24'	Attendance: 6,000; Referee: Kil Ki-Chul

6 May 1990 KPFL	Daewoo Royals	0–0	Ilhwa Chunma	Busan Gudeok Stadium, Busan
				Attendance: 15,000; Referee: Choi Kil-Soo

12 May 1990 KPFL	POSCO Atoms	0–0	Ilhwa Chunma	Daegu Civil Stadium, Daegu
				Attendance: 4,000; Referee: Choi Kil-Soo

19 May 1990 KPFL	Ilhwa Chunma	1–1	Lucky-Goldstar Hwangso	Dongdaemun Stadium, Seoul
	Ko Jeong-Woon 16'		Kim Sang-Jin 78'	Attendance: 5,000; Referee: Park Hee-Cha-Rang

23 May 1990 KPFL	Daewoo Royals	0–2	Ilhwa Chunma	Busan Gudeok Stadium, Busan
			Park Jong-Dae 22', Kim I-Ju 32'	Attendance: 5,000; Referee: Kil Ki-Chul

26 May 1990 KPFL	Ilhwa Chunma	1–1	Hyundai Horang-i	Masan Stadium, Masan
	Ko Jeong-Woon 39'		Kim Hyun-Seok2 25'	Attendance: 3,500; Referee: Lim Jung-Sik

30 May 1990 KPFL	Yukong Elephants	2–3	Ilhwa Chunma	Suwon Civil Stadium, Suwon
	Kim Bong-Gil 77', Kim Jun-Hyun 90+2'		Choi Chung-Il 02', Kim Yong-Se 54', Kim Kyung-Bum 74'	Attendance: 400; Referee: Kim In-Soo

2 June 1990 KPFL	Ilhwa Chunma	0–2	POSCO Atoms	Dongdaemun Stadium, Seoul
			Lee Gye-Won 78', Kim Sang-ho 87'	Attendance: 6,000; Referee: Kim In-Soo

6 June 1990 KPFL	Lucky-Goldstar Hwangso	3–1	Ilhwa Chunma	Dongdaemun Stadium, Seoul
	Lee Young-Ik 29', Choi Dae-Sik 55', Choi Tae-Jin 62'		Choi Chung-Il 52'	Attendance: 11,750; Referee: Kil Ki-Chul

21 July 1990 KPFL	Hyundai Horang-i	3–2	Ilhwa Chunma	Chuncheon Civil Stadium, Chuncheon
	Shin Yeon-Ho 18', Jung Dong-Bok 38' 58'		Kim Yong-Se 01', Ha Sung-Jun 47'	Attendance: 1,000; Referee: Park Hwa-Deok

18 August 1990 KPFL	Ilhwa Chunma	1–1	Yukong Elephants	Dongdaemun Stadium, Seoul
	Kim Yong-Se 89'		Lee Kwang-Jong 82'	Attendance: 7,500; Referee: Choi Kil-Soo

25 August 1990 KPFL	POSCO Atoms	3–0	Ilhwa Chunma	Steelyard Stadium, Pohang
	Mészöly 41', Kwon Hyung-Jung 65', Kim Hong-Un 80'			Attendance: 4,950; Referee: Han Woon-Jib

1 September 1990 KPFL	Lucky-Goldstar Hwangso	3–0	Ilhwa Chunma	Dongdaemun Stadium, Seoul
	Choi Jin-Han 54', Lee In-Jae 57', Yoon Sang-Chul 72'			Attendance: 2,000; Referee: Kil Ki-Chul

8 September 1990 KPFL	Ilhwa Chunma	1–2	Daewoo Royals	Dongdaemun Stadium, Seoul
	Kim Young-Joo 51'		Park Hyun-Yong 49', Ha Seok-Ju 52'	Attendance: 600; Referee: Ko Sung-Deuk

15 September 1990 KPFL	Hyundai Horang-i	2–2	Ilhwa Chunma	Ulsan Complex Stadium, Ulsan
	Kim Hyun-Seok 76', Jung Dong-Bok 88'		Kim Yong-Se 05', Kim I-Ju 79'	Attendance: 3,000; Referee: Park Hwa-Deok

22 September 1990 KPFL	Ilhwa Chunma	1–3	Yukong Elephants	Dongdaemun Stadium, Seoul
	Kim Yong-Se 09'		Koo Bon-Seok 32' 41', Kwon Jung-Hwa 84'	Attendance: 1,000; Referee: Ko Sung-Deuk

27 September 1990 KPFL	Ilhwa Chunma	1–1	Daewoo Royals	Dongdaemun Stadium, Seoul
	Lee Sang-Yoon 02'		Park Hyun-Yong 72'	Attendance: 500; Referee: Ko Sung-Deuk

12 October 1990 KPFL	POSCO Atoms	1–2	Ilhwa Chunma	Steelyard Stadium, Pohang
	Lee Ki-Keun 19'		Lee Sang-Yoon 09', Park Jong-Dae 32'	Attendance: 2,000; Referee: Nam Chung-Hee

17 October 1990 KPFL	Ilhwa Chunma	0–0	Lucky-Goldstar Hwangso	Dongdaemun Stadium, Seoul
				Attendance: 1,000; Referee: Ko Sung-Deuk

17 October 1990 KPFL	Daewoo Royals	2–0	Ilhwa Chunma	Busan Gudeok Stadium, Busan
	Yeo Bum-Kyu 25', Lee Tae-Ho 77'			Attendance: 2,000; Referee: Kim In-Soo

27 October 1990 KPFL	Ilhwa Chunma	1–0	Hyundai Horang-i	Dongdaemun Stadium, Seoul
	Park Jong-Dae 59'			Attendance: 1,000; Referee: Lim Jung-Sik

30 October 1990 KPFL	Yukong Elephants	2–1	Ilhwa Chunma	Incheon Civil Stadium, Incheon
	Kwon Jung-Hwa 15', Lee Kwang-Jong 60'		Baek Jong-Chul 75'	Attendance: 400; Referee: Han Woon-Jib

3 November 1990 KPFL	Ilhwa Chunma	3–1	POSCO Atoms	Dongdaemun Stadium, Seoul
	Lee Sang-Yoon 41', Ko Jeong-Woon 68', Kim Young-Joo 88'		Lee Won-Chul 54'	Attendance: 1,000; Referee: Park Hee-Cha-Rang
