= K League Best XI =

Award

The K League Best XI is an award for the best eleven players in a K League season.

== K League 1 award ==
=== Winners ===
Players marked bold won the Most Valuable Player award in that respective year.

| Season | Goalkeeper | Defenders | Midfielders | Forwards |
|---|---|---|---|---|
| 1983 | (South Korea) Cho Byung-deuk (Hallelujah) | (South Korea) Park Sung-hwa (Hallelujah) (South Korea) Kim Chul-soo (POSCO) (South Korea) Chang Woe-ryong (Daewoo) (South Korea) Lee Kang-jo (Yukong) | (South Korea) Cho Kwang-rae (Daewoo) (South Korea) Park Chang-sun (Hallelujah) | (South Korea) Park Yoon-ki (Yukong) (South Korea) Lee Kil-yong (POSCO) (South Korea) Lee Chun-seok (Daewoo) (South Korea) Kim Yong-se (Yukong) |
| 1984 | (South Korea) Oh Yun-kyo (Yukong) | (South Korea) Chung Yong-hwan (Daewoo) (South Korea) Park Kyung-hoon (POSCO) (South Korea) Park Sung-hwa (Hallelujah) (South Korea) Chung Jong-soo (Yukong) | (South Korea) Park Chang-sun (Hallelujah) (South Korea) Huh Jung-moo (Hyundai) (South Korea) Cho Young-jeung (Lucky-Goldstar) | (South Korea) Choi Soon-ho (POSCO) (South Korea) Lee Tae-ho (Daewoo) (South Korea) Baek Jong-chul (Hyundai) |
| 1985 | (South Korea) Kim Hyun-tae (Lucky-Goldstar) | (South Korea) Chang Woe-ryong (Daewoo) (South Korea) Han Moon-bae (Lucky-Goldstar) (South Korea) Kim Chul-soo (POSCO) (South Korea) Choi Kang-hee (Hyundai) | (South Korea) Park Sang-in (Hallelujah) (South Korea) Lee Heung-sil (POSCO) (South Korea) Park Hang-seo (Lucky-Goldstar) | (South Korea) Kim Yong-se (Yukong) (Thailand) Piyapong Pue-on (Lucky-Goldstar) (South Korea) Kang Deuk-soo (Lucky-Goldstar) |
| 1986 | (South Korea) Kim Hyun-tae (Lucky-Goldstar) | (South Korea) Kim Pyung-seok (Hyundai) (South Korea) Cho Young-jeung (Lucky-Goldstar) (South Korea) Park No-bong (Daewoo) (South Korea) Choi Kang-hee (Hyundai) | (South Korea) Cho Min-kook (Lucky-Goldstar) (South Korea) Lee Heung-sil (POSCO) (South Korea) Yoon Sung-hyo (Hanil) | (South Korea) Kim Yong-se (Yukong) (South Korea) Chung Hae-won (Daewoo) (South Korea) Ham Hyun-gi (Hyundai) |
| 1987 | (South Korea) Kim Poong-joo (Daewoo) | (South Korea) Gu Sang-bum (Lucky-Goldstar) (South Korea) Choi Gi-bong (Yukong) (South Korea) Chung Yong-hwan (Daewoo) (South Korea) Park Kyung-hoon (POSCO) | (South Korea) Kim Sam-soo (Hyundai) (South Korea) Noh Soo-jin (Yukong) (South Korea) Lee Heung-sil (POSCO) | (South Korea) Choi Sang-kook (POSCO) (South Korea) Chung Hae-won (Daewoo) (South Korea) Kim Joo-sung (Daewoo) |
| 1988 | (South Korea) Oh Yun-kyo (Hyundai) | (South Korea) Choi Kang-hee (Hyundai) (South Korea) Choi Tae-jin (Daewoo) (South Korea) Son Hyung-sun (Daewoo) (South Korea) Kang Tae-sik (POSCO) | (South Korea) Choi Jin-han (Lucky-Goldstar) (South Korea) Kim Sang-ho (POSCO) (South Korea) Hwangbo Kwan (Yukong) | (South Korea) Lee Kee-keun (POSCO) (South Korea) Ham Hyun-gi (Hyundai) (South Korea) Shin Dong-chul (Yukong) |
| 1989 | (South Korea) Cha Sang-kwang (Lucky-Goldstar) | (South Korea) Lim Jong-heon (Ilhwa) (South Korea) Cho Yoon-hwan (Yukong) (South Korea) Choi Yun-kyum (Yukong) (South Korea) Lee Young-ik (Lucky-Goldstar) | (South Korea) Lee Heung-sil (POSCO) (South Korea) Cho Duck-je (Daewoo) (South Korea) Kang Jae-soon (Hyundai) | (South Korea) Yoon Sang-chul (Lucky-Goldstar) (South Korea) Cho Keung-yeon (POSCO) (South Korea) Noh Soo-jin (Yukong) |
| 1990 | (South Korea) Yoo Dae-soon (Yukong) | (South Korea) Lim Jong-heon (Ilhwa) (South Korea) Choi Young-jun (Lucky-Goldstar) (South Korea) Choi Tae-jin (Lucky-Goldstar) (South Korea) Lee Jae-hee (Daewoo) | (South Korea) Choi Jin-han (Lucky-Goldstar) (South Korea) Lee Heung-sil (POSCO) (South Korea) Choi Dae-shik (Lucky-Goldstar) | (South Korea) Yoon Sang-chul (Lucky-Goldstar) (South Korea) Lee Tae-ho (Daewoo) (South Korea) Song Ju-seok (Hyundai) |
| 1991 | (South Korea) Kim Poong-joo (Daewoo) | (South Korea) Chung Yong-hwan (Daewoo) (South Korea) Park Hyun-yong (Daewoo) (Poland) Tadeusz Świątek (Yukong) | (South Korea) Kim Hyun-seok (Hyundai) (South Korea) Lee Young-jin (LG) (South Korea) Kim Joo-sung (Daewoo) (South Korea) Choi Kang-hee (Hyundai) (South Korea) Lee Sang-yoon (Ilhwa) | (South Korea) Lee Kee-keun (POSCO) (South Korea) Ko Jeong-woon (Ilhwa) |
| 1992 | (Tajikistan) Valeri Sarychev (Ilhwa) | (South Korea) Hong Myung-bo (POSCO) (South Korea) Lee Jong-hwa (Ilhwa) (South Korea) Park Jung-bae (LG) | (South Korea) Shin Hong-gi (Hyundai) (South Korea) Kim Hyun-Seok (Hyundai) (South Korea) Shin Tae-yong (Ilhwa) (South Korea) Park Tae-ha (POSCO) (South Korea) Shin Dong-chul (Yukong) | (South Korea) Park Chang-hyun (POSCO) (South Korea) Lim Keun-jae (LG) |
| 1993 | (Tajikistan) Valeri Sarychev (Ilhwa) | (South Korea) Choi Young-il (Hyundai) (South Korea) Lee Jong-hwa (Ilhwa) (South Korea) Yoo Dong-kwan (POSCO) | (South Korea) Kim Pan-keun (Daewoo) (South Korea) Shin Tae-yong (Ilhwa) (South Korea) Kim Dong-hae (LG) (South Korea) Lee Sang-yoon (Ilhwa) (South Korea) Kim Bong-gil (Yukong) | (South Korea) Cha Sang-hae (POSCO) (South Korea) Yoon Sang-chul (LG) |
| 1994 | (Tajikistan) Valeri Sarychev (Ilhwa) | (South Korea) An Ik-soo (Ilhwa) (South Korea) Yoo Sang-chul (Hyundai) (South Korea) Hong Myung-bo (POSCO) (South Korea) Huh Ki-tae (Yukong) | (South Korea) Hwangbo Kwan (Yukong) (South Korea) Shin Tae-yong (Ilhwa) (South Korea) Ko Jeong-woon (Ilhwa) | (South Korea) Yoon Sang-chul (LG) (Federal Republic of Yugoslavia) Rade Bogdanović (POSCO) (South Korea) Kim Kyung-rae (Jeonbuk) |
| 1995 | (Tajikistan) Valeri Sarychev (Ilhwa) | (South Korea) Choi Young-il (Hyundai) (South Korea) Hong Myung-bo (Pohang) (South Korea) Huh Ki-tae (Yukong) | (South Korea) Ko Jeong-woon (Ilhwa) (South Korea) Kim Hyun-seok (Hyundai) (South Korea) Shin Tae-yong (Ilhwa) (Bosnia and Herzegovina) Amir Teljigović (Daewoo) (South Korea) Kim Pan-keun (LG) | (South Korea) Hwang Sun-hong (Pohang) (South Korea) Roh Sang-rae (Jeonnam) |
| 1996 | (South Korea) Kim Byung-ji (Ulsan) | (South Korea) Yoon Sung-hyo (Suwon) (South Korea) Kim Joo-sung (Busan) (South Korea) Huh Ki-tae (Bucheon) | (South Korea) Shin Tae-yong (Cheonan) (Romania) Pavel Badea (Suwon) (South Korea) Hong Myung-bo (Pohang) (South Korea) Ha Seok-ju (Busan) (South Korea) Kim Hyun-seok (Ulsan) | (Federal Republic of Yugoslavia) Rade Bogdanović (Pohang) (Russia) Sergey Burdin (Bucheon) |
| 1997 | (South Korea) Shin Bum-chul (Busan) | (South Korea) Kim Joo-sung (Busan) (Brazil) Maciel (Jeonnam) (South Korea) An Ik-soo (Pohang) | (South Korea) Kim Hyun-seok (Ulsan) (South Korea) Shin Jin-won (Daejeon) (South Korea) Kim In-wan (Jeonnam) (South Korea) Lee Jin-haeng (Suwon) (South Korea) Jung Jae-kwon (Busan) | (Federal Republic of Yugoslavia) Radivoje Manić (Busan) (Ukraine) Serhiy Skachenko (Jeonnam) |
| 1998 | (South Korea) Kim Byung-ji (Ulsan) | (South Korea) An Ik-soo (Pohang) (Brazil) Maciel (Jeonnam) (South Korea) Lee Lim-saeng (Bucheon) | (South Korea) Ko Jong-soo (Suwon) (South Korea) Yoo Sang-chul (Ulsan) (South Korea) Baek Seung-chul (Pohang) (South Korea) Ahn Jung-hwan (Busan) (South Korea) Jung Jeong-soo (Ulsan) | (South Korea) Kim Hyun-seok (Ulsan) (Serbia and Montenegro) Saša Drakulić (Suwon) |
| 1999 | (South Korea) Lee Woon-jae (Suwon) | (South Korea) Kang Chul (Bucheon) (South Korea) Kim Joo-sung (Busan) (Brazil) Maciel (Jeonnam) (South Korea) Shin Hong-gi (Suwon) | (South Korea) Seo Jung-won (Suwon) (South Korea) Ko Jong-soo (Suwon) (Russia) Denis Laktionov (Suwon) (South Korea) Ko Jeong-woon (Pohang) | (South Korea) Ahn Jung-hwan (Busan) (Federal Republic of Yugoslavia) Saša Drakulić (Suwon) |
| 2000 | (South Korea) Shin Eui-son (Anyang) | (South Korea) Kang Chul (Bucheon) (South Korea) Lee Lim-saeng (Bucheon) (South Korea) Kim Hyun-soo (Seongnam) (Brazil) Maciel (Jeonnam) | (Brazil) André Gaspar (Anyang) (South Korea) Shin Tae-yong (Seongnam) (South Korea) Jeon Kyung-jun (Bucheon) (Russia) Denis Laktionov (Suwon) | (South Korea) Choi Yong-soo (Anyang) (South Korea) Kim Do-hoon (Jeonbuk) |
| 2001 | (South Korea) Shin Eui-son (Anyang) | (Federal Republic of Yugoslavia) Zoran Urumov (Busan) (South Korea) Kim Hyun-soo (Seongnam) (South Korea) Kim Yong-hee (Seongnam) (South Korea) Lee Young-pyo (Anyang) | (South Korea) Shin Tae-yong (Seongnam) (South Korea) Seo Jung-won (Suwon) (South Korea) Song Chong-gug (Busan) (South Korea) Nam Ki-il (Bucheon) | (South Korea) Woo Sung-yong (Busan) (Brazil) Sandro Cardoso (Suwon) |
| 2002 | (South Korea) Lee Woon-jae (Suwon) | (South Korea) Kim Hyun-soo (Seongnam) (South Korea) Kim Tae-young (Jeonnam) (South Korea) Choi Jin-cheul (Jeonbuk) (South Korea) Hong Myung-bo (Pohang) | (South Korea) Shin Tae-yong (Seongnam) (South Korea) Yoo Sang-chul (Ulsan) (Brazil) André Gaspar (Anyang) (South Korea) Seo Jung-won (Suwon) | (South Korea) Kim Dae-eui (Seongnam) (South Korea) Lee Chun-soo (Ulsan) |
| 2003 | (South Korea) Seo Dong-myung (Ulsan) | (South Korea) Choi Jin-cheul (Jeonbuk) (South Korea) Kim Tae-young (Jeonnam) (South Korea) Kim Hyun-soo (Seongnam) (Brazil) Rogério Pinheiro (Pohang) | (South Korea) Shin Tae-yong (Seongnam) (South Korea) Lee Seong-nam (Seongnam) (South Korea) Lee Kwan-woo (Daejeon) (South Korea) Kim Nam-il (Jeonnam) | (South Korea) Kim Do-hoon (Seongnam) (Brazil) Magno Alves (Jeonbuk) |
| 2004 | (South Korea) Lee Woon-jae (Suwon) | (Brazil) Rogério Pinheiro (Pohang) (South Korea) Yoo Kyoung-youl (Ulsan) (Argentina) Javier Martín Musa (Suwon) (South Korea) Kwak Hee-ju (Suwon) | (South Korea) Kim Dong-jin (Seoul) (Brazil) André Luiz Tavares (Pohang) (South Korea) Kim Do-heon (Suwon) (South Korea) Kim Dae-eui (Suwon) | (Brazil) Nádson (Suwon) (Brazil) Mota (Jeonnam) |
| 2005 | (South Korea) Kim Byung-ji (Pohang) | (South Korea) Lim Joong-yong (Incheon) (South Korea) Yoo Kyoung-youl (Ulsan) (South Korea) Cho Yong-hyung (Bucheon) (South Korea) Kim Young-chul (Seongnam) | (South Korea) Lee Chun-soo (Ulsan) (South Korea) Lee Ho (Ulsan) (South Korea) Kim Do-heon (Seongnam) (South Korea) Cho Won-hee (Suwon) | (South Korea) Park Chu-young (Seoul) (Brazil) Leandro Machado (Ulsan) |
| 2006 | (South Korea) Park Ho-jin (Suwon) | (South Korea) Jang Hak-young (Seongnam) (Croatia) Mato Neretljak (Suwon) (South Korea) Choi Jin-cheul (Jeonbuk) (South Korea) Kim Young-chul (Seongnam) | (South Korea) Kim Do-heon (Seongnam) (South Korea) Lee Kwan-woo (Suwon) (South Korea) Baek Ji-hoon (Suwon) (Brazil) Popó (Busan) | (South Korea) Woo Sung-yong (Seongnam) (South Korea) Kim Eun-jung (Seoul) |
| 2007 | (South Korea) Kim Byung-ji (Seoul) | (Brazil) Adilson (Seoul) (Croatia) Mato Neretljak (Suwon) (South Korea) Hwang Jae-won (Pohang) (South Korea) Jang Hak-young (Seongnam) | (Brazil) André Luiz Tavares (Pohang) (South Korea) Lee Kwan-woo (Suwon) (South Korea) Kim Gi-dong (Pohang) (South Korea) Kim Do-heon (Seongnam) | (South Korea) Lee Keun-ho (Daegu) (Brazil) Caboré (Gyeongnam) |
| 2008 | (South Korea) Lee Woon-jae (Suwon) | (Brazil) Adilson (Seoul) (Croatia) Mato Neretljak (Suwon) (South Korea) Park Dong-hyuk (Ulsan) (South Korea) Choi Hyo-jin (Pohang) | (South Korea) Kim Hyeung-bum (Jeonbuk) (South Korea) Cho Won-hee (Suwon) (South Korea) Ki Sung-yueng (Seoul) (South Korea) Lee Chung-yong (Seoul) | (South Korea) Lee Keun-ho (Daegu) (Brazil) Edu (Suwon) |
| 2009 | (South Korea) Shin Hwa-yong (Pohang) | (South Korea) Kim Sang-sik (Jeonbuk) (South Korea) Kim Hyung-il (Pohang) (South Korea) Hwang Jae-won (Pohang) (South Korea) Choi Hyo-jin (Pohang) | (South Korea) Choi Tae-uk (Jeonbuk) (South Korea) Ki Sung-yueng (Seoul) (South Korea) Kim Jung-woo (Seongnam) (Brazil) Eninho (Jeonbuk) | (South Korea) Lee Dong-gook (Jeonbuk) (Brazil) Denilson (Pohang) |
| 2010 | (South Korea) Kim Yong-dae (Seoul) | (Brazil) Adilson (Seoul) (South Korea) Hong Jeong-ho (Jeju) (Australia) Sasa Ognenovski (Seongnam) (South Korea) Choi Hyo-jin (Seoul) | (Colombia) Mauricio Molina (Seongnam) (South Korea) Yoon Bit-garam (Gyeongnam) (South Korea) Koo Ja-cheol (Jeju) (Brazil) Eninho (Jeonbuk) | (South Korea) Kim Eun-jung (Jeju) (Montenegro) Dejan Damjanović (Seoul) |
| 2011 | (South Korea) Kim Young-kwang (Ulsan) | (South Korea) Park Won-jae (Jeonbuk) (South Korea) Kwak Tae-hwi (Ulsan) (South Korea) Cho Sung-hwan (Jeonbuk) (South Korea) Choi Chul-soon (Jeonbuk) | (South Korea) Yeom Ki-hun (Suwon) (South Korea) Yoon Bit-garam (Gyeongnam) (South Korea) Ha Dae-sung (Seoul) (Brazil) Eninho (Jeonbuk) | (South Korea) Lee Dong-gook (Jeonbuk) (Montenegro) Dejan Damjanović (Seoul) |
| 2012 | (South Korea) Kim Yong-dae (Seoul) | (Brazil) Adilson (Seoul) (South Korea) Jung In-whan (Incheon) (South Korea) Kwak Tae-hwi (Ulsan) (South Korea) Kim Chang-soo (Busan) | (Colombia) Mauricio Molina (Seoul) (South Korea) Ha Dae-sung (Seoul) (South Korea) Hwang Jin-sung (Pohang) (South Korea) Lee Keun-Ho (Ulsan) | (South Korea) Lee Dong-gook (Jeonbuk) (Montenegro) Dejan Damjanović (Seoul) |
| 2013 | (South Korea) Kim Seung-gyu (Ulsan) | (Brazil) Adilson (Seoul) (South Korea) Kim Chi-gon (Ulsan) (South Korea) Kim Won-il (Pohang) (South Korea) Lee Yong (Ulsan) | (South Korea) Ko Moo-yeol (Pohang) (South Korea) Lee Myung-joo (Pohang) (South Korea) Ha Dae-sung (Seoul) (Brazil) Leonardo (Jeonbuk) | (South Korea) Kim Shin-wook (Ulsan) (Montenegro) Dejan Damjanović (Seoul) |
| 2014 | (South Korea) Kwoun Sun-tae (Jeonbuk) | (South Korea) Hong Chul (Suwon) (South Korea) Kim Ju-young (Seoul) (Australia) Alex Wilkinson (Jeonbuk) (South Korea) Cha Du-ri (Seoul) | (South Korea) Lim Sang-hyub (Busan) (South Korea) Koh Myong-jin (Seoul) (South Korea) Lee Seung-gi (Jeonbuk) (South Korea) Han Kyo-won (Jeonbuk) | (South Korea) Lee Dong-gook (Jeonbuk) (Brazil) Júnior Santos (Suwon) |
| 2015 | (South Korea) Kwoun Sun-tae (Jeonbuk) | (South Korea) Hong Chul (Suwon) (Croatia) Matej Jonjić (Incheon) (South Korea) Kim Kee-hee (Jeonbuk) (South Korea) Cha Du-ri (Seoul) | (South Korea) Yeom Ki-hun (Suwon) (South Korea) Lee Jae-sung (Jeonbuk) (South Korea) Kwon Chang-hoon (Suwon) (South Korea) Song Jin-hyung (Jeju) | (South Korea) Lee Dong-gook (Jeonbuk) (Brazil) Adriano Michael Jackson (Seoul) |
| 2016 | (South Korea) Kwoun Sun-tae (Jeonbuk) | (South Korea) Chung Woon (Jeju) (Spain) Osmar (Seoul) (Croatia) Matej Jonjić (Incheon) (South Korea) Ko Kwang-min (Seoul) | (Brazil) Leonardo (Jeonbuk) (South Korea) Lee Jae-sung (Jeonbuk) (South Korea) Kwon Chang-hoon (Suwon) (Brazil) Ricardo Lopes (Jeonbuk) | (South Korea) Jung Jo-gook (Gwangju) (Brazil) Adriano Michael Jackson (Seoul) |
| 2017 | (South Korea) Jo Hyeon-woo (Daegu) | (South Korea) Kim Jin-su (Jeonbuk) (South Korea) Kim Min-jae (Jeonbuk) (South Korea) Oh Ban-suk (Jeju) (South Korea) Choi Chul-soon (Jeonbuk) | (South Korea) Yeom Ki-hun (Suwon) (South Korea) Lee Jae-sung (Jeonbuk) (South Korea) Lee Chang-min (Jeju) (South Korea) Lee Seung-gi (Jeonbuk) | (Brazil) Johnathan Goiano (Suwon) (South Korea) Lee Keun-ho (Gangwon) |
| 2018 | (South Korea) Jo Hyeon-woo (Daegu) | (South Korea) Hong Chul (Suwon) (South Korea) Kim Min-jae (Jeonbuk) (Austria) Richard Windbichler (Ulsan) (South Korea) Lee Yong (Jeonbuk) | (Brazil) Negueba (Gyeongnam) (South Korea) Choi Young-jun (Gyeongnam) (Costa Rica) Elías Aguilar (Incheon) (Brazil) Ricardo Lopes (Jeonbuk) | (Brazil) Marcão (Gyeongnam) (Brazil) Júnior Negrão (Ulsan) |
| 2019 | (South Korea) Jo Hyeon-woo (Daegu) | (South Korea) Hong Chul (Suwon) (South Korea) Hong Jeong-ho (Jeonbuk) (South Korea) Lee Yong (Jeonbuk) (South Korea) Kim Tae-hwan (Ulsan) | (South Korea) Moon Seon-min (Jeonbuk) (South Korea) Kim Bo-kyung (Ulsan) (Brazil) Cesinha (Daegu) (Brazil) Wanderson (Pohang) | (Australia) Adam Taggart (Suwon) (Brazil) Júnior Negrão (Ulsan) |
| 2020 | (South Korea) Jo Hyeon-woo (Ulsan) | (South Korea) Kang Sang-woo (Pohang) (South Korea) Kwon Kyung-won (Sangju) (South Korea) Hong Jeong-ho (Jeonbuk) (South Korea) Kim Tae-hwan (Ulsan) | (South Korea) Han Kyo-won (Jeonbuk) (South Korea) Son Jun-ho (Jeonbuk) (Brazil) Cesinha (Daegu) (Serbia) Aleksandar Paločević (Pohang) | (Brazil) Júnior Negrão (Ulsan) (Russia) Stanislav Iljutcenko (Pohang) |
| 2021 | (South Korea) Jo Hyeon-woo (Ulsan) | (South Korea) Lee Ki-je (Suwon) (Netherlands) Dave Bulthuis (Ulsan) (South Korea) Hong Jeong-ho (Jeonbuk) (South Korea) Kang Sang-woo (Pohang) | (South Korea) Lim Sang-hyub (Pohang) (Georgia (country)) Valeri Qazaishvili (Ulsan) (Brazil) Cesinha (Daegu) (South Korea) Lee Dong-jun (Ulsan) | (South Korea) Joo Min-kyu (Jeju) (South Africa) Lars Veldwijk (Suwon FC) |
| 2022 | (South Korea) Jo Hyeon-woo (Ulsan) | (South Korea) Kim Jin-su (Jeonbuk) (South Korea) Kim Young-gwon (Ulsan) (South Korea) Park Jin-seob (Jeonbuk) (South Korea) Kim Tae-hwan (Ulsan) | (South Korea) Kim Dae-won (Gangwon) (South Korea) Sin Jin-ho (Pohang) (Brazil) Cesinha (Daegu) (South Korea) Lee Chung-yong (Ulsan) | (South Korea) Cho Gue-sung (Jeonbuk) (South Korea) Joo Min-kyu (Jeju) |
| 2023 | (South Korea) Jo Hyeon-woo (Ulsan) | (Brazil) Wanderson (Pohang) (South Korea) Kim Young-gwon (Ulsan) (Australia) Alex Grant (Pohang) (South Korea) Seol Young-woo (Ulsan) | (Guinea-Bissau) Gerso Fernandes (Incheon) (Brazil) Oberdan (Pohang) (South Korea) Lee Soon-min (Gwangju) (South Korea) Um Won-sang (Ulsan) | (South Korea) Joo Min-kyu (Ulsan) (Brazil) Zeca (Pohang) |
| 2024 | (South Korea) Jo Hyeon-woo (Ulsan) | (South Korea) Lee Myung-jae (Ulsan) (South Korea) Park Seung-wook (Gimcheon) (South Korea) Kim Kee-hee (Ulsan) (South Korea) Hwang Mun-ki (Gangwon) | (Brazil) Anderson Oliveira (Suwon FC) (South Korea) Ko Seung-beom (Ulsan) (Brazil) Oberdan (Pohang) (South Korea) Yang Min-hyeok (Gangwon) | (South Korea) Lee Dong-gyeong (Gimcheon) (South Korea) Lee Sang-heon (Gangwon) |
| 2025 | (South Korea) Song Bum-keun (Jeonbuk) | (South Korea) Lee Myung-jae (Daejeon) (South Korea) Hong Jeong-ho (Jeonbuk) (Jordan) Yazan Al-Arab (Seoul) (South Korea) Kim Moon-hwan (Daejeon) | (South Korea) Song Min-kyu (Jeonbuk) (South Korea) Park Jin-seob (Jeonbuk) (South Korea) Kim Jin-gyu (Jeonbuk) (South Korea) Kang Sang-yoon (Jeonbuk) | (Syria) Pablo Sabbag (Suwon FC) (South Korea) Lee Dong-gyeong (Ulsan) |

=== Appearances by player ===
| Player | Apps | Years | Club(s) |
|---|---|---|---|
| (South Korea) Shin Tae-yong | 9 | 1992, 1993, 1994, 1995, 1996, 2000, 2001, 2002, 2003 | Ilhwa Chunma (4); Cheonan Ilhwa Chunma (1); Seongnam Ilhwa Chunma (4) |
| (South Korea) Jo Hyeon-woo | 8 | 2017, 2018, 2019, 2020, 2021, 2022, 2023, 2024 | Daegu FC (3); Ulsan Hyundai (4); Ulsan HD (1) |
| (South Korea) Kim Hyun-seok | 6 | 1991, 1992, 1995, 1996, 1997, 1998 | Hyundai Horang-i (3); Ulsan Hyundai Horang-i (3) |
| (Tajikistan) (South Korea) Shin Eui-son (Valeri Sarychev) | 6 | 1992, 1993, 1994, 1995, 2000, 2001 | Ilhwa Chunma (4); Anyang LG Cheetahs (2) |
| (South Korea) Lee Heung-sil | 5 | 1985, 1986, 1987, 1989, 1990 | POSCO Atoms (5) |
| (South Korea) Kim Joo-sung | 5 | 1987, 1991, 1996, 1997, 1999 | Daewoo Royals (2); Busan Daewoo Royals (3) |
| (South Korea) Hong Myung-bo | 5 | 1992, 1994, 1995, 1996, 2002 | POSCO Atoms (2); Pohang Atoms (2); Pohang Steelers (1) |
| (Brazil) Adilson | 5 | 2007, 2008, 2010, 2012, 2013 | FC Seoul (5) |
| (South Korea) Lee Dong-gook | 5 | 2009, 2011, 2013, 2014, 2015 | Jeonbuk Hyundai Motors (5) |
| (South Korea) Hong Jeong-ho | 5 | 2010, 2019, 2020, 2021, 2025 | Jeju United (1); Jeonbuk Hyundai Motors (4) |
| (South Korea) Choi Kang-hee | 4 | 1985, 1986, 1988, 1991 | Hyundai Horang-i (4) |
| (South Korea) Yoon Sang-chul | 4 | 1989, 1990, 1993, 1994 | Lucky-Goldstar Hwangso (2); LG Cheetahs (2) |
| (South Korea) Ko Jeong-woon | 4 | 1991, 1994, 1995, 1999 | Ilhwa Chunma (3); Pohang Steelers (1) |
| (South Korea) Kim Hyun-soo | 4 | 2000, 2001, 2002, 2003 | Seongnam Ilhwa Chunma (4) |
| (South Korea) Kim Byung-ji | 4 | 1996, 1998, 2005, 2007 | Ulsan Hyundai Horang-i (2); Pohang Steelers (1); FC Seoul (1) |
| (South Korea) Kim Do-heon | 4 | 2004, 2005, 2006, 2007 | Seongnam Ilhwa Chunma (3); Suwon Samsung Bluewings (1) |
| (South Korea) Lee Woon-jae | 4 | 1999, 2002, 2004, 2008 | Suwon Samsung Bluewings (4) |
| (Montenegro) Dejan Damjanović | 4 | 2010, 2011, 2012, 2013 | FC Seoul (4) |
| (South Korea) Lee Keun-ho | 4 | 2007, 2008, 2012, 2017 | Daegu FC (2); Ulsan Hyundai (1); Gangwon FC (1) |
| (South Korea) Hong Chul | 4 | 2014, 2015, 2018, 2019 | Suwon Samsung Bluewings (4) |
| (Brazil) Cesinha | 4 | 2019, 2020, 2021, 2022 | Daegu FC (4) |

=== Appearances by nationality ===
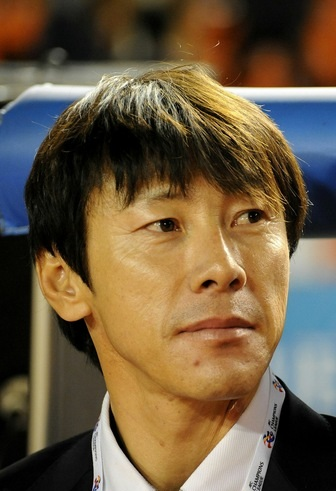
Shin Tae-yong appeared in the K League 1 Best XI nine times.

| Nation | Apps |
|---|---|
| South Korea | 378 |
| Brazil | 50 |
| (Federal Republic of Yugoslavia) FR Yugoslavia | 6 |
| Croatia | 5 |
| Tajikistan | 4 |
| Montenegro | 4 |
| Russia | 4 |
| Australia | 4 |
| Colombia | 2 |
| 16 nations | 1 |
| Total | 473 |

== K League 2 award ==
Players marked bold won the Most Valuable Player award in that respective year.

| Season | Goalkeeper | Defenders | Midfielders | Forwards |
|---|---|---|---|---|
| 2013 | (South Korea) Kim Ho-jun (Sangju) | (South Korea) Choi Chul-soon (Sangju) (South Korea) Kim Hyung-il (Sangju) (South Korea) Lee Jae-seong (Sangju) (South Korea) Oh Beom-seok (Police) | (South Korea) Yeom Ki-hun (Police) (South Korea) Lee Ho (Sangju) (South Korea) Choi Jin-soo (Anyang) (South Korea) Kim Young-hoo (Police) | (South Korea) Lee Keun-ho (Sangju) (Brazil) Wesley Alex (Goyang) |
| 2014 | (South Korea) Park Ju-won (Daejeon) | (South Korea) Lee Jae-kwon (Ansan) (South Korea) Heo Jae-won (Daegu) (South Korea) Yoon Won-il (Daejeon) (South Korea) Rim Chang-woo (Daejeon) | (South Korea) Kim Ho-nam (Gwangju) (South Korea) Lee Yong-rae (Ansan) (South Korea) Choi Jin-soo (Anyang) (South Korea) Choi Jin-ho (Gangwon) | (Brazil) Adriano Michael Jackson (Daejeon) (Brazil) Wesley Alex (Gangwon) |
| 2015 | (South Korea) Jo Hyeon-woo (Daegu) | (South Korea) Park Jin-po (Sangju) (South Korea) Shin Hyung-min (Ansan) (South Korea) Kang Min-soo (Sangju) (South Korea) Lee Yong (Sangju) | (South Korea) Ko Kyung-min (Anyang) (South Korea) Lee Seung-gi (Sangju) (South Korea) Cho Won-hee (Seoul E) (South Korea) Kim Jae-sung (Seoul E) | (Brazil) Johnathan Goiano (Daegu) (South Korea) Joo Min-kyu (Seoul E) |
| 2016 | (South Korea) Jo Hyeon-woo (Daegu) | (South Korea) Jeong Woo-jae (Daegu) (South Korea) Hwang Jae-won (Daegu) (South Korea) Lee Han-saem (Gangwon) (South Korea) Jung Seung-yong (Gangwon) | (Brazil) Waguininho (Bucheon) (South Korea) Lee Hyun-seung (Ansan) (South Korea) Hwang In-beom (Daejeon) (Brazil) Cesinha (Daegu) | (South Korea) Kim Dong-chan (Daejeon) (Brazil) Willian Popp (Busan) |
| 2017 | (South Korea) Lee Bum-soo (Gyeongnam) | (South Korea) Choi Jae-soo (Gyeongnam) (South Korea) Park Ji-soo (Gyeongnam) (Croatia) Ivan Herceg (Gyeongnam) (South Korea) Woo Joo-sung (Gyeongnam) | (South Korea) Jung Won-jin (Gyeongnam) (South Korea) Hwang In-beom (Daejeon) (South Korea) Moon Ki-han (Bucheon) (South Korea) Bae Ki-jong (Gyeongnam) | (Brazil) Marcão (Gyeongnam) (South Korea) Lee Jeong-hyeop (Busan) |
| 2018 | (South Korea) Kim Young-kwang (Seoul E) | (South Korea) Seo Bo-min (Seongnam) (South Korea) Yun Young-sun (Seongnam) (South Korea) Lee Han-saem (Asan) (South Korea) Kim Moon-hwan (Busan) | (Brazil) Rômulo (Busan) (South Korea) Hwang In-beom (Daejeon) (South Korea) Lee Myung-joo (Asan) (South Korea) Ahn Hyeon-beom (Asan) | (South Korea) Na Sang-ho (Gwangju) (Romania) Aurelian Chițu (Daejeon) |
| 2019 | (South Korea) Yoon Pyeong-gook (Gwangju) | (South Korea) Lee Euddeum (Gwangju) (Brazil) Nilson Júnior (Bucheon) (Uzbekistan) Rustam Ashurmatov (Gwangju) (South Korea) Kim Moon-hwan (Busan) | (South Korea) Kim Sang-won (Anyang) (Brazil) Alex Lima (Anyang) (South Korea) Lee Dong-jun (Busan) (Brazil) Rômulo (Busan) | (South Korea) Cho Gue-sung (Anyang) (Nigeria) Chisom Egbuchulam (Suwon FC) |
| 2020 | (South Korea) Oh Seung-hoon (Jeju) | (South Korea) Jeong Woo-jae (Jeju) (South Korea) Chung Woon (Jeju) (South Korea) Cho Yu-min (Suwon FC) (South Korea) Ahn Hyeon-beom (Jeju) | (South Korea) Gong Min-hyun (Jeju) (South Korea) Lee Chang-min (Jeju) (South Korea) Kim Young-uk (Jeju) (South Korea) Baek Sung-dong (Gyeongnam) | (North Korea) An Byong-jun (Suwon FC) (Brazil) Leandro Ribeiro (Seoul E) |
| 2021 | (South Korea) Gu Sung-yun (Gimcheon) | (South Korea) Seo Young-jae (Daejeon) (South Korea) Jung Seung-hyun (Gimcheon) (South Korea) Joo Hyeon-woo (Anyang) (South Korea) Choi Jun (Busan) | (South Korea) Kim Kyung-jung (Anyang) (South Korea) Kim Hyeon-uk (Jeonnam) (South Korea) Park Jin-seob (Daejeon) (Japan) Masatoshi Ishida (Daejeon) | (North Korea) An Byong-jun (Busan) (Costa Rica) Jonathan Moya (Anyang) |
| 2022 | (South Korea) Kim Kyeong-min (Gwangju) | (South Korea) Cho Hyun-taek (Bucheon) (South Korea) Ahn Young-kyu (Gwangju) (South Korea) Cho Yu-min (Daejeon) (South Korea) Doo Hyeon-seok (Gwangju) | (Brazil) Willyan (Daejeon) (South Korea) Park Han-bin (Gwangju) (South Korea) Lee Soon-min (Gwangju) (South Korea) Eom Ji-sung (Gwangju) | (South Korea) Yu Kang-hyun (Chungnam Asan) (Brazil) Tiago Orobó (Gyeongnam) |
| 2023 | (South Korea) Koo Sang-min (Busan) | (South Korea) Kim Dong-jin (Anyang) (South Korea) Lee Han-do (Busan) (South Korea) Lee Sang-min (Gimcheon) (South Korea) Choi Jun (Busan) | (South Korea) Kim Jin-gyu (Gimcheon) (Brazil) Valdívia (Jeonnam) (South Korea) Won Du-jae (Gimcheon) (South Korea) Mo Jae-hyeon (Gyeongnam) | (Colombia) Luis Mina (Gimpo) (Brazil) Jorge Teixeira (Chungbuk Cheongju) |
| 2024 | (South Korea) Kim Da-sol (Anyang) | (South Korea) Kim Dong-jin (Anyang) (Spain) Osmar (Seoul E) (South Korea) Lee Chang-yong (Anyang) (South Korea) Lee Tae-hee (Anyang) | (Colombia) Luis Mina (Gimpo) (South Korea) Kim Jeong-hyun (Anyang) (Brazil) Valdívia (Jeonnam) (Brazil) Juninho Rocha (Chungnam Asan) | (Brazil) Matheus Oliveira (Anyang) (Brazil) Bruno Mota (Cheonan) |
| 2025 | (South Korea) Min Seong-jun (Incheon) | (South Korea) Lee Ju-yong (Incheon) (South Korea) Kim Geon-hui (Incheon) (Brazil) Venício Tomás (Seongnam) (South Korea) Shin Jae-won (Seongnam) | (Guinea-Bissau) Gerso Fernandes (Incheon) (South Korea) Lee Myung-joo (Incheon) (Brazil) Valdívia (Jeonnam) (Brazil) Euller (Seoul E) | (Montenegro) Stefan Mugoša (Incheon) (Colombia) Leonardo Acevedo (Seongnam) |

== Special selections ==
| Period | Goalkeeper | Defenders | Midfielders | Forwards |
|---|---|---|---|---|
| '80s | (South Korea) Cho Byung-deuk | (South Korea) Choi Kang-hee (South Korea) Chung Yong-hwan (South Korea) Park Sung-hwa (South Korea) Park Kyung-hoon | (South Korea) Huh Jung-moo (South Korea) Cho Kwang-rae (South Korea) Park Chang-sun (South Korea) Lee Heung-sil | (South Korea) Choi Soon-ho (South Korea) Chung Hae-won |
| '90s | (South Korea) Cha Sang-kwang | (South Korea) Shin Hong-gi (South Korea) Kim Pan-keun (South Korea) Choi Young-il (South Korea) Gu Sang-bum | (South Korea) Ko Jeong-woon (South Korea) Lee Young-jin (South Korea) Choi Moon-sik (South Korea) Hwangbo Kwan | (South Korea) Hwang Sun-hong (South Korea) Kim Joo-sung |
| 30th anniversary (1983–2013) | (Tajikistan) (South Korea) Shin Eui-son (Valeri Sarychev) | (South Korea) Choi Kang-hee (South Korea) Kim Tae-young (South Korea) Hong Myung-bo (South Korea) Park Kyung-hoon | (South Korea) Kim Joo-sung (South Korea) Shin Tae-yong (South Korea) Yoo Sang-chul (South Korea) Seo Jung-won | (South Korea) Hwang Sun-hong (South Korea) Choi Soon-ho |

== See also ==
- K League
- K League MVP Award
- K League Top Scorer Award
- K League Top Assist Provider Award
- K League Manager of the Year Award
- K League Young Player of the Year Award
- K League FANtastic Player
- K League Players' Player of the Year
- K League All-Star Game
