= Nyúl (surname) =

Nyúl is a Hungarian language surname from the Hungarian word for rabbit. Notable people with the name include:

- Ferenc Nyúl (1896–1971), Hungarian football player and coach
- István Nyúl (1961), Hungarian football player
