= Kim Sang-ho (footballer) =

South Korean footballer (born 1964)

Personal information
- Date of birth: October 5, 1964 (age 62)
- Place of birth: South Korea
- Position: Midfielder

Youth career
- 1983–1986: Dong-A University

Senior career*
Years	Team	Apps	(Gls)
1987–1994	POSCO Atoms	149	(10)
1995–1998	Chunnam Dragons	64	(2)
Total		213	(12)

International career
1989–1991	South Korea	15	(2)

Managerial career
- 1999–2000: Honam University (Coach)
- 2000–2001: South Korea U-20 (Coach)
- 2002–2004: Chunnam Dragons (Coach)
- 2005–2007: South Korea U-17 (Coach)
- 2008: Chunnam Dragons (Coach)
- 2008–2011: Gangwon FC (Coach)
- 2011–2012: Gangwon FC
- 2013–2014: South Korea U-20
- 2015: KFA coach education (Coach)
- 2016: Shanghai Shenxin
Medal record
Asian Games
Bronze medal – third place	1990 Beijing	Team
- * Club domestic league appearances and goals

- Kim Sang-ho
- Hangul: 김상호
- Hanja: 金相鎬
- RR: Gim Sangho
- MR: Kim Sangho

Kim Sang-ho (Korean: 김상호, born October 5, 1964) is a former South Korean football player and coach.

He started his career with POSCO Atoms since 1987. To 1994, he played 149 league games and scored 10 goals. In 1988, he was one of K-League Best XI. From 1995, he moved to newly formed Chunnam Dragons, In Chunnam, he played 66 league games and scored 3 goals.

After retirement, he became a football coach. He went to England, obtained FA coaching "B" licence in 1998, also took training at Wimbledon.

Back to South Korea, he coached several team for years.

== Honors ==
=== Club ===
==== POSCO Atoms ====
- K-League champions : 1988, 1992
- K-League runner-up : 1987
- K-League Cup champion : 1993

==== Chunnam Dragons ====
- K-League runner-up : 1997
- Korean FA Cup champion : 1997
- K-League Cup runner-up : 1997

=== Individual ===
- K-League Best XI : 1988 (MF)
- K-League All-Star Game : 1991

== Club career statistics ==
Club performance			League		Cup		League Cup		Continental		Total	
Season	Club	League	Apps	Goals	Apps	Goals	Apps	Goals	Apps	Goals	Apps	Goals
South Korea			League		KFA Cup		League Cup		Asia		Total	
1987	POSCO Atoms	K-League	29	3	-		-		-		29	3
1988	POSCO Atoms	K-League	15	0	-		-		-		15	0
1989	POSCO Atoms	K-League	14	0	-		-		-		14	0
1990	POSCO Atoms	K-League	22	2	-		-		-		22	2
1991	POSCO Atoms	K-League	36	5	-		-		-		36	5
1992	POSCO Atoms	K-League	9	0	-		0	0	-		9	0
1993	POSCO Atoms	K-League	14	0	-		0	0	-		14	0
1994	POSCO Atoms	K-League	10	0	-		0	0	-		10	0
1995	Chunnam Dragons	K-League	25	1	-		0	0	-		25	1
1996	Chunnam Dragons	K-League	27	0	?	?	0	0	-			
1997	Chunnam Dragons	K-League	12	1	?	?	15	2	-			
1998	Chunnam Dragons	K-League	0	0	?	?	4	1	?	?		
Total	South Korea		213	12			19	3				
Career total			213	12			19	3				

== International goals ==
Results list South Korea's goal tally first.

Date	Venue	Opponent	Score	Result	Competition
September 25, 1990	Beijing	Pakistan	2 goals	7-0	1990 Asian Games
