= Cho Min-kook =

South Korean footballer and coach (born 1963)

Cho Min-Kook 조민국
Personal information
- Full name: Cho Min-Kook
- Date of birth: July 5, 1963 (age 63)
- Place of birth: Seoul, South Korea
- Height: 1.82 m (6 ft 0 in)
- Position: Defender

Team information
- Current team: Ulsan Hyundai

Youth career
- 1982–1985: Korea University

Senior career*
Years	Team	Apps	(Gls)
1986–1992	Lucky-Goldstar Hwangso / LG Cheetahs	129	(14)
1993–1994	Chūō Bōhan F.C.	?	(?)

International career
1983–1991	South Korea	46	(5)

Managerial career
- 1998: Dong-eui University
- 1999–2008: Korea University
- 2008–2013: Ulsan Hyundai Mipo Dolphin
- 2014: Ulsan Hyundai
Medal record
Men's football
Representing South Korea
Asian Games
Gold medal – first place	1986 Seoul	Team
- * Club domestic league appearances and goals

- Cho Min-kook
- Hangul: 조민국
- Hanja: 曺敏國
- RR: Jo Minguk
- MR: Cho Min'guk

Cho Min-Kook (Korean: 조민국; born July 5, 1963) is a South Korean former footballer and football coach who played for the whole of his career as a defender for Lucky-Goldstar Hwangso and LG Cheetahs. He managed K League Classic side Ulsan Hyundai for the 2014 season.

== Honours ==
=== Player ===
Lucky-Goldstar Hwangso / LG Cheetahs

- K-League Winners (1): 1990
- K-League Runners-up (1) : 1986, 1989
- Korean National Football Championship Winners (1) : 1988

=== Individual ===
- K-League Best XI : 1986

== Club career statistics ==
All-Time Club Performance
Club	Season	League			League Cup			AFC Champions League			Total
Club	Season	Apps	Goals	Assts	Apps	Goals	Assts	Apps	Goals	Assts	Apps	Goals	Assts
Lucky-Goldstar Hwangso	1986	10	5	0	2	0	2	?	?	?
Lucky-Goldstar Hwangso	1987	19	0	0	-	-	-	?	?	?
Lucky-Goldstar Hwangso	1988	10	0	0	-	-	-	-	-	-	10	0	0
Lucky-Goldstar Hwangso	1989	9	1	2	-	-	-	-	-	-	9	1	2
Lucky-Goldstar Hwangso	1990	23	1	3	-	-	-	-	-	-	23	1	3
LG Cheetahs	1991	32	6	2	-	-	-	-	-	-	32	6	2
LG Cheetahs	1992	26	1	2	8	1	0	-	-	-	34	2	2
Career totals		129	14	9	10	1	2

== International goals ==
Results list South Korea's goal tally first.

Date	Venue	Opponent	Score	Result	Competition
May 19, 1985	Seoul	Malaysia	1 goal	2-0	1986 FIFA World Cup qualification
February 16, 1986	Hong Kong	Paraguay	1 goal	1-3	1986 Lunar New Year Cup
September 28, 1986	Seoul	China	1 goal	4-2	1986 Asian Games
May 25, 1989	Seoul	Nepal	1 goal	9-0	1990 FIFA World Cup qualification
June 5, 1989	Singapore	Malaysia	1 goal	3-0	1990 FIFA World Cup qualification
