= Lee Jae-hee =

South Korean footballer

Lee Jae-Hee 이재희
Personal information
- Full name: Lee Jae-hee
- Date of birth: April 15, 1959 (age 67)
- Place of birth: South Korea
- Height: 1.76 m (5 ft 9 1/2 in)
- Position: Defender

Youth career
- 1979–1982: Kyung Hee University

Senior career*
Years	Team	Apps	(Gls)
1983–1992	Daewoo Rolyas	198	(1)

International career
1984–1987	South Korea		
- * Club domestic league appearances and goals

- Lee Jae-hee
- Hangul: 이재희
- Hanja: 李在熙
- RR: I Jaehui
- MR: I Chaehŭi

Lee Jae-hee (Korean: 이재희; born April 15, 1959) is a former South Korean footballer who played as a defender.

He started professional career at Daewoo Rolyas in 1983.

He was selected in the K League Best XI for the 1990 K League season.
