= Lee Soon-min =

South Korean footballer (born 1994)

- Lee in 2026

Personal information
- Date of birth: 22 May 1994 (age 32)
- Place of birth: South Korea
- Height: 1.78 m (5 ft 10 in)
- Position: Midfielder

Team information
- Current team: Daejeon Hana Citizen
- Number: 44

Senior career*
Years	Team	Apps	(Gls)
2017–2023	Gwangju FC	97	(4)
2018–2020	→ Pocheon Citizen (draft)	34	(4)
2024–	Daejeon Hana Citizen	59	(0)

International career^{‡}
2023–	South Korea	4	(0)
- * Club domestic league appearances and goals as of 3 August 2026 ‡ National team caps and goals as of 16 November 2023

- Lee Soon-min
- Hangul: 이순민
- RR: I Sunmin
- MR: I Sunmin

Lee Soon-min (Korean: 이순민; born 22 May 1994) is a South Korean professional footballer who plays as a midfielder for K League 1 club Daejeon Hana Citizen and the South Korea national team.

== International career ==
In August 2023, Lee received his first call-up to the South Korea senior national team by head coach Jürgen Klinsmann, for two friendly matches against Wales and Saudi Arabia.

== Career statistics ==
As of 10 November 2024

Appearances and goals by club, season and competition
Club	Season	League			National cup (Note: Includes Korean FA Cup)		League cup		Continental		Total	
Club	Season	Division	Apps	Goals	Apps	Goals	Apps	Goals	Apps	Goals	Apps	Goals
Gwangju FC	2017	K League 1	0	0	2	0	—		—		2	0
Gwangju FC	2020	K League 1	2	0	1	0	—		—		3	0
Gwangju FC	2021	K League 1	28	1	1	0	—		—		29	1
Gwangju FC	2022	K League 2	32	2	0	0	—		—		32	2
Gwangju FC	2023	K League 1	35	1	0	0	—		—		35	1
Gwangju FC	Total		97	4	4	0	—		—		101	4
Pocheon Citizen (draft)	2018	K3 League	16	2	1	0	—		—		17	2
Pocheon Citizen (draft)	2019	K3 League	15	1	2	0	—		—		17	1
Pocheon Citizen (draft)	2020	K4 League	3	1	1	0	—		—		4	1
Pocheon Citizen (draft)	Total		34	4	4	0	—		—		38	4
Daejeon Hana Citizen	2024	K League 1	25	0	1	0	—		—		26	0
Career total			156	8	9	0	0	0	0	0	165	8

== Honours ==
Gwangju FC

- K League 2: 2022

Individual

- K League 2 Best XI: 2022
- K League 1 Best XI: 2023
