= Choi Young-il =

South Korean footballer (born 1966)

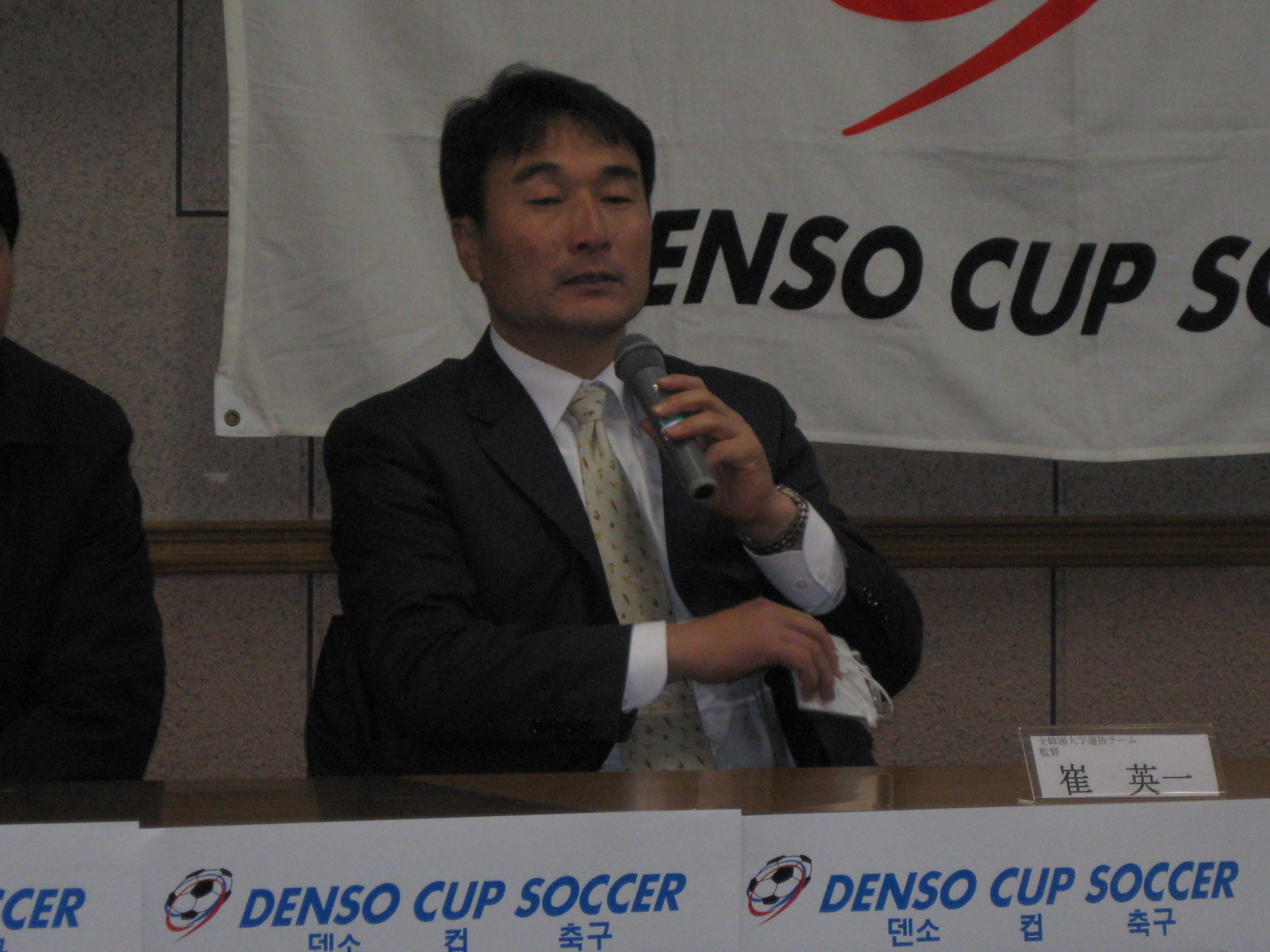
- Choi in 2010

Personal information
- Full name: Choi Young-il
- Date of birth: 25 April 1966 (age 60)
- Place of birth: Namhae, Gyeongnam, South Korea
- Height: 1.81 m (5 ft 11 1/2 in)
- Position: Centre-back

Youth career
- 1985–1988: Dong-a University

Senior career*
Years	Team	Apps	(Gls)
1989–1996	Ulsan Hyundai Horang-i	209	(3)
1997–1998	Busan Daewoo Royals	14	(0)
1999	Liaoning Fushun	20	(0)
2000	Anyang LG Cheetahs	0	(0)
Total		243	(3)

International career
1994–1998	South Korea	55	(0)

Managerial career
- 2000–2013: Dong-a University
- * Club domestic league appearances and goals

- Choi Young-il
- Hangul: 최영일
- Hanja: 崔英一
- RR: Choe Yeongil
- MR: Ch'oe Yŏngil

Choi Young-il (Korean: 최영일; Hanja: 崔英一; born 25 April 1966) is a South Korean former footballer who played as a defender. He played most of his club career for Ulsan Hyundai Horang-i, and represented South Korea at the 1994 and 1998 FIFA World Cup.

== Style of play ==
Choi's tussles and tackles were far from fair, but were effective in performing man marking against opponents' best forwards, especially Japan's legend Kazuyoshi Miura. Hence, he became known among Korean fans as "The Shadow of Miura".

== Honours ==
Ulsan Hyundai Horang-i

- K League 1: 1996
- Korean League Cup: 1995

Busan Daewoo Royals

- K League 1: 1997
- Korean League Cup: 1997, 1997+, 1998+

Individual

- K League 1 Best XI: 1993, 1995
- K League All-Star: 1995
- K League '90s All-Star Team: 2003
