= Yoo Dae-soon =

South Korean footballer

Yoo Dae-soon 유대순
Personal information
- Full name: Yoo Dae-soon
- Date of birth: March 4, 1965 (age 61)
- Place of birth: South Korea
- Height: 1.82 m (5 ft 11 1/2 in)
- Position: Goalkeeper

Youth career
- 1985–1988: Korea University

Senior career*
Years	Team	Apps	(Gls)
1989–1994	Yukong Elephants	95	(0)

International career
1989	South Korea	1	(0)
- * Club domestic league appearances and goals

Yoo Dae-soon (Korean: 유대순; born March 4, 1965) is a South Korean former footballer who played as a goalkeeper.

He started his professional career at Yukong Elephants in 1989.

He was winner of K League Best XI in 1990 K League.
