= Gu Sang-bum =

South Korean footballer (born 1964)

Personal information
- Full name: Gu Sang-bum
- Date of birth: 15 June 1964 (age 62)
- Place of birth: Seoul, South Korea
- Height: 1.75 m (5 ft 9 in)
- Position: Left-back

College career
Years	Team	Apps	(Gls)
1982–1985	Incheon National University		

Senior career*
Years	Team	Apps	(Gls)
1986–1993	LG Cheetahs	133	(7)
1994	Daewoo Royals	24	(1)
1995	Pohang Atoms	14	(2)
Total		171	(12)

International career
1985–1987	South Korea B		
1988–1994	South Korea	67	(3)

Managerial career
- 2004–2008: Incheon National University
- 2012: Sangju Sangmu Phoenix (assistant)
- 2016: Seongnam FC (caretaker)
Medal record
Representing South Korea
Men's football
Summer Universiade
Silver medal – second place	1987 Zagreb	Team
AFC Asian Cup
Silver medal – second place	1988 Qatar	Team
Asian Games
Bronze medal – third place	1990 Beijing	Team
- * Club domestic league appearances and goals

Gu Sang-bum (Korean: 구상범; born 15 June 1964) is a former South Korean football player who played as a left-back. He played for the South Korea national football team in 1990 and 1994 FIFA World Cup.

== Career statistics ==
=== Club ===
Appearances and goals by club, season and competition
Club	Season	League			League cup		Total	
Club	Season	Division	Apps	Goals	Apps	Goals	Apps	Goals
LG Cheetahs	1986	K League	10	1	16	4	26	5
LG Cheetahs	1987	K League	31	3	—		31	3
LG Cheetahs	1988	K League	10	2	—		10	2
LG Cheetahs	1989	K League	9	0	—		9	0
LG Cheetahs	1990	K League	9	1	—		9	1
LG Cheetahs	1991	K League	36	2	—		36	2
LG Cheetahs	1992	K League	18	1	8	0	26	1
LG Cheetahs	1993	K League	10	1	1	0	11	1
LG Cheetahs	Total		133	11	25	4	158	15
Daewoo Royals	1994	K League	24	0	0	0	24	0
Pohang Atoms	1995	K League	14	1	2	0	16	1
Career total			171	12	27	4	198	16

=== International ===
Results list South Korea's goal tally first.

List of international goals scored by Gu Sang-bum
No.	Date	Venue	Opponent	Score	Result	Competition
1	1 October 1990	Beijing, China	Kuwait	1–0	1–0	1990 Asian Games
2	25 April 1993	Changwon, South Korea	Iraq	1–1	1–1	Friendly
3	13 June 1993	Seoul, South Korea	Bahrain	3–0	3–0	1994 FIFA World Cup qualification

== Honours ==
LG Cheetahs

- K League 1: 1990
- Korean National Championship: 1988
- Korean League Cup runner-up: 1992

South Korea B

- Summer Universiade silver medal: 1987

South Korea

- AFC Asian Cup runner-up: 1988
- Asian Games bronze medal: 1990
- Afro-Asian Cup of Nations: 1987
- Dynasty Cup: 1990

Individual

- K League 1 Best XI: 1987
- K League All-Star: 1991, 1995
- K League '90s All-Star Team: 2003

Sporting positions
Preceded by Lee Young-jin	LG Cheetahs captain 1993	Succeeded by Choi Young-jun
