= Cho Woo-seok =

South Korean footballer (born 1968)

Personal information
- Date of birth: 8 October 1968 (age 58)
- Place of birth: South Korea
- Height: 1.74 m (5 ft 8 1/2 in)
- Position: Defender

Youth career
- 1987–1991: Daegu University

Senior career*
Years	Team	Apps	(Gls)
1991–1998	Ilhwa Chunma	113	(5)
- * Club domestic league appearances and goals as of 18 June 2011 ‡ National team caps and goals as of 18 June 2011

- Cho Woo-seok
- Hangul: 조우석
- Hanja: 趙祐奭
- RR: Jo Useok
- MR: Cho Usŏk

Cho Woo-seok (Korean: 조우석; born 8 October 1968) is a South Korean footballer.

== Football career ==
Cho started professional football club career with Ilhwa Chunma in 1991. He was awarded as Rookie of the Year of 1991 season.

== Honours ==
Individual

- K-League Rookie of the Year Award : 1991
