= Yoo Dong-kwan =

South Korean footballer (born 1963)

Yoo Dong-Kwan 유동관
Personal information
- Full name: Yoo Dong-kwan
- Date of birth: March 18, 1964 (age 62)
- Place of birth: South Korea
- Height: 1.76 m (5 ft 9 1/2 in)
- Position: Midfielder

Youth career
- 1982–1985: Hanyang University

Senior career*
Years	Team	Apps	(Gls)
1986–1995	POSCO Atoms	186	(5)

International career
1983–1984	South Korea	6	(0)
- * Club domestic league appearances and goals

- Yoo Dong-kwan
- Hangul: 유동관
- RR: Yu Donggwan
- MR: Yu Tonggwan

Yoo Dong-kwan (Korean: 유동관; born May 12, 1963) is a South Korean former footballer who played as a midfielder.

He started his professional career at POSCO Atoms in 1986.

He was winner of K League Best XI, K League Champion twice, a League Cup Title, and a K League Manager of the year as the manager of the POSCO Atoms.
