= Park Hyun-yong =

South Korean footballer (born 1964)

Park Hyun-yong 박현용
Personal information
- Full name: Park Hyun-yong
- Date of birth: April 6, 1964 (age 62)
- Place of birth: South Korea
- Height: 1.78 m (5 ft 10 in)
- Position: Defender

Youth career
- 1983–1986: Ajou University

Senior career*
Years	Team	Apps	(Gls)
1987–1995	Daewoo Royals	184	(15)

International career
1992	South Korea	3	(1)
- * Club domestic league appearances and goals

- Park Hyun-yong
- Hangul: 박현용
- Hanja: 朴鉉用
- RR: Bak Hyeonyong
- MR: Pak Hyŏnyong

Park Hyun-yong (Korean: 박현용; born April 6, 1964 South Korea) is a South Korean former footballer who played as a defender.

He started professional career at Daewoo Royals in 1987.

He was winner of K League Best XI in 1991 K League.
