= Huh Ki-tae =

South Korean footballer

Huh Ki-Tae 허기태
Personal information
- Full name: Huh Ki-Tae
- Date of birth: July 13, 1967 (age 59)
- Height: 1.80 m (5 ft 11 in)
- Position: Defender

Youth career
- Korea University

Senior career*
Years	Team	Apps	(Gls)
1990–1997	Yukong Elephants / Bucheon SK	191	(9)
1998–1999	Suwon Samsung Bluewings	11	(0)

International career
1995–1999	South Korea	16	(0)
- * Club domestic league appearances and goals

Huh Ki-Tae (born July 13, 1967) is a South Korean footballer. He played for Yukong Elephants.

== Honors and awards ==
=== Player ===
Yukong Elephants

- K-League Runners-up (1) : 1994
- League Cup Winners (2) : 1994, 1996

=== Individual ===
- K-League Best XI (3) : 1994, 1995, 1996
