= Gilbert Massock =

Cameroonian footballer (born 1977)

Personal information
- Full name: Gilbert Massock
- Date of birth: June 5, 1977 (age 49)
- Place of birth: Cameroon
- Height: 1.93 m (6 ft 4 in)
- Position: Forward

Senior career*
Years	Team	Apps	(Gls)
1994–1995	Canon Yaoundé	0	(0)
1995–1996	USL Dunkerque	2	(0)
1996–1997	Excelsior Mouscron	2	(0)
1998	Anyang LG Cheetahs	4	(0)
2001–2003	US Maubeuge	0	(0)
2003–2005	SC Abbeville	45	(14)
2006–2007	AC Amiens	?	(?)
2007–2008	SC Abbeville	3	(0)
2015–	SC Abbeville	1	(0)

International career
1994–1995	Cameroon		(2)
- * Club domestic league appearances and goals

Gilbert Massock (born June 5, 1977 in Cameroon) is a former football player who played mainly for French football clubs. He also played for FC Seoul of the South Korean K League, then known as Anyang LG Cheetahs.

He played for the Cameroonian national team.
