= Choi Young-jun (footballer, born 1965) =

South Korean footballer

Personal information
- Full name: Choi Young-jun
- Date of birth: August 16, 1965 (age 61)
- Place of birth: South Korea
- Height: 1.80 m (5 ft 11 in)
- Position: Defender

Team information
- Current team: Busan IPark

Youth career
- 1974–1977: Yonsei University

Senior career*
Years	Team	Apps	(Gls)
1988–1994	Lucky-Goldstar Hwangso; LG Cheetahs	163	(2)
1995–1996	Ulsan Hyundai Horangi	26	(1)

Managerial career
- 1998: Ulsan University (Coach)
- 1999: Ulsan Hyundai Horangi (Coach)
- 2001–2003: Brunei U-20
- 2004–2008: Bucheon SK / Jeju United (Coach)
- 2009: Daegu FC (Coach)
- 2011: Jeju United (Coach)
- 2015–2016: Busan IPark
- * Club domestic league appearances and goals as of 17 August 2011 ‡ National team caps and goals as of 17 August 2011

Choi Yeong-joon (born August 16, 1965) is a retired South Korean footballer.

He graduated in Yonsei University, and played for Lucky-Goldstar Hwangso. He was the first captain of Lucky-Goldstar Hwangso.

== Honours ==
=== Player ===
Lucky-Goldstar Hwangso

- K-League Winners (1) : 1990

Ulsan Hyundai Horangi

- K-League Winners (1) : 1996

=== Individual ===
- K-League Best XI (1) : 1990

Sporting positions
Preceded by Gu Sang-Bum	LG Cheetahs captain 1994	Succeeded by Yoon Sang-Chul
