= Ferenc Nyúl =

Hungarian footballer and coach

Personal information
- Full name: Ferenc Nyúl
- Date of birth: 2 November 1896
- Place of birth: Hungary
- Date of death: 30 April 1971 (aged 74)
- Position: Midfielder

Senior career*
Years	Team	Apps	(Gls)
1913–1920	MTK Hungária FC		
1920–1921	Hagibor Cluj		
1921–1925	MTK Hungária FC		

International career
1916–1920	Hungary	4	(0)

Managerial career
- 1934–1935: Warszawianka
- 1938–1939: Universitatea Cluj
- * Club domestic league appearances and goals

Ferenc Nyúl (2 November 1896 – 30 April 1971) was a Hungarian football player and coach.

== Career ==
=== Club ===
Nyúl played for MTK Hungária FC from 1913 until 1920, when he joined the Romanian side Hagibor Cluj. In 1921 he returned to MTK Hungária FC, replacing the Hungarian legend, Bela Guttmann. Nyúl played for the club until 1925.

=== National team ===
Between 1916 and 1920 Nyúl played four games for the Hungarian national team.

== Coaching career ==
In 1937 Nyúl trained the Romanian team, Universitatea Cluj.
