= Kim Hyun-tae =

South Korean footballer and coach (born 1961)

Personal information
- Date of birth: May 1, 1961 (age 65)
- Place of birth: South Korea
- Height: 1.80 m (5 ft 11 in)
- Position: Goalkeeper

Youth career
- 1980–1983: Korea University

Senior career*
| Years | Team | Apps | (Gls) |
| 1984–1991 | Lucky-Goldstar Hwangso / LG Cheetahs | 99 | (0) |
| 1994 | LG Cheetahs | 0 | (0) |
| 1996–1997 | Anyang LG Cheetahs | 0 | (0) |
- * Club domestic league appearances and goals

- Kim Hyun-tae
- Hangul: 김현태
- Hanja: 金顯泰
- RR: Gim Hyeontae
- MR: Kim Hyŏnt'ae

Kim Hyun-tae (Korean: 김현태; born 1 May 1961) is a South Korean football goalkeeping coach and former footballer.

== Honors and awards ==
=== Club ===
Lucky-Goldstar Hwangso

- K League (2): 1985, 1990

=== Individual ===
- K-League Best XI (2): 1985, 1986
- K-League Best GK (2): 1985, 1986
