= Cha Sang-kwang =

South Korean footballer and coach (born 1963)

Personal information
- Full name: Cha Sang-kwang
- Date of birth: 31 May 1963 (age 63)
- Place of birth: Icheon, Gyeonggi, South Korea
- Height: 1.89 m (6 ft 2 in)
- Position: Goalkeeper

College career
Years	Team	Apps	(Gls)
1982–1985	Hanyang University		

Senior career*
Years	Team	Apps	(Gls)
1986–1991	LG Cheetahs	133	(0)
1992–1993	POSCO Atoms	36	(0)
1994	Yukong Elephants	16	(0)
1995	LG Cheetahs	10	(0)
1996	Bucheon Yukong	1	(0)
1997	Cheonan Ilhwa Chunma	9	(0)
Total		205	(0)

International career
1985	South Korea B		
1991–1996	South Korea	10	(0)
- * Club domestic league appearances and goals

Cha Sang-kwang is a South Korean football coach and former player.

== International career ==
Cha played as a goalkeeper for South Korean national team in the 1994 Asian Games. However, his first and only major tournament left him with bad memory and discredit. He faced only two shots during the semi-final match against Uzbekistan, but conceded one after failing to catch the ball right in front of him by mistake. On the other hand, South Korea scored no goals and was eliminated, although having 28 shots. He was widely criticised for his mistake in his country after the tournament.

== Coaching career ==
Cha became a goalkeeping coach after retiring as a player. He coached Seongnam Ilhwa Chunma and South Korean national youth teams.

== Personal life ==
Cha played with his younger brother Cha Sang-hae in POSCO Atoms. Sang-hae played as a striker and won the K League Top Scorer Award in the 1993 season.

== Honours ==
Hanyang University

- Korean National Championship: 1983

Lucky-Goldstar Hwangso

- K League 1: 1985, 1990
- Korean National Championship: 1988

POSCO Atoms

- K League 1: 1992
- Korean League Cup: 1993

Bucheon Yukong

- Korean League Cup: 1994, 1996

Cheonan Ilhwa Chunma

- Asian Club Championship runner-up: 1996–97
- Korean FA Cup runner-up: 1997

Individual

- K League 1 Best Goalkeeper: 1989
- K League 1 Best XI: 1989
- K League All-Star: 1991, 1992
- K League '90s All-Star Team: 2003
