= Tadeusz Świątek =

Polish footballer

Personal information
- Full name: Tadeusz Świątek
- Date of birth: 8 November 1961 (age 64)
- Place of birth: Świdnica, Świdnica County, Poland
- Height: 1.80 m (5 ft 11 in)
- Positions: Midfielder; forward

Senior career*
Years	Team	Apps	(Gls)
1980–1982	Wisła Płock		
1982–1989	Widzew Łódź	178	(17)
1989–1991	Yukong Elephants	72	(7)
1992	Polonia Warsaw		
1992–1993	Hutnik Warsaw		

International career
?–1981	Poland U19	1	(0)
1986	Poland	1	(0)
- * Club domestic league appearances and goals

Tadeusz Świątek (Polish pronunciation: [taˈdɛ.uʂ ˈɕfjɔntɛk]; born 8 November 1961) is a Polish former professional footballer.

== Club career ==
He played in Polish clubs such as Wisła Płock, Widzew Łódź, Polonia Warsaw and Hutnik Warsaw. He also played at Yukong Elephants in South Korea.

He was one of the first Polish players of K League, along with Leszek Iwanicki.

== International career ==
He was part of the Poland national under-20 football team for 1981 FIFA World Youth Championship

== Honours ==
Widzew Łódź

- Polish Cup: 1984–85

Yukong Elephants

- K League: 1989

Individual

- K League Best XI: 1991
