= Lee Young-jin (footballer, born 1963) =

South Korean footballer and manager

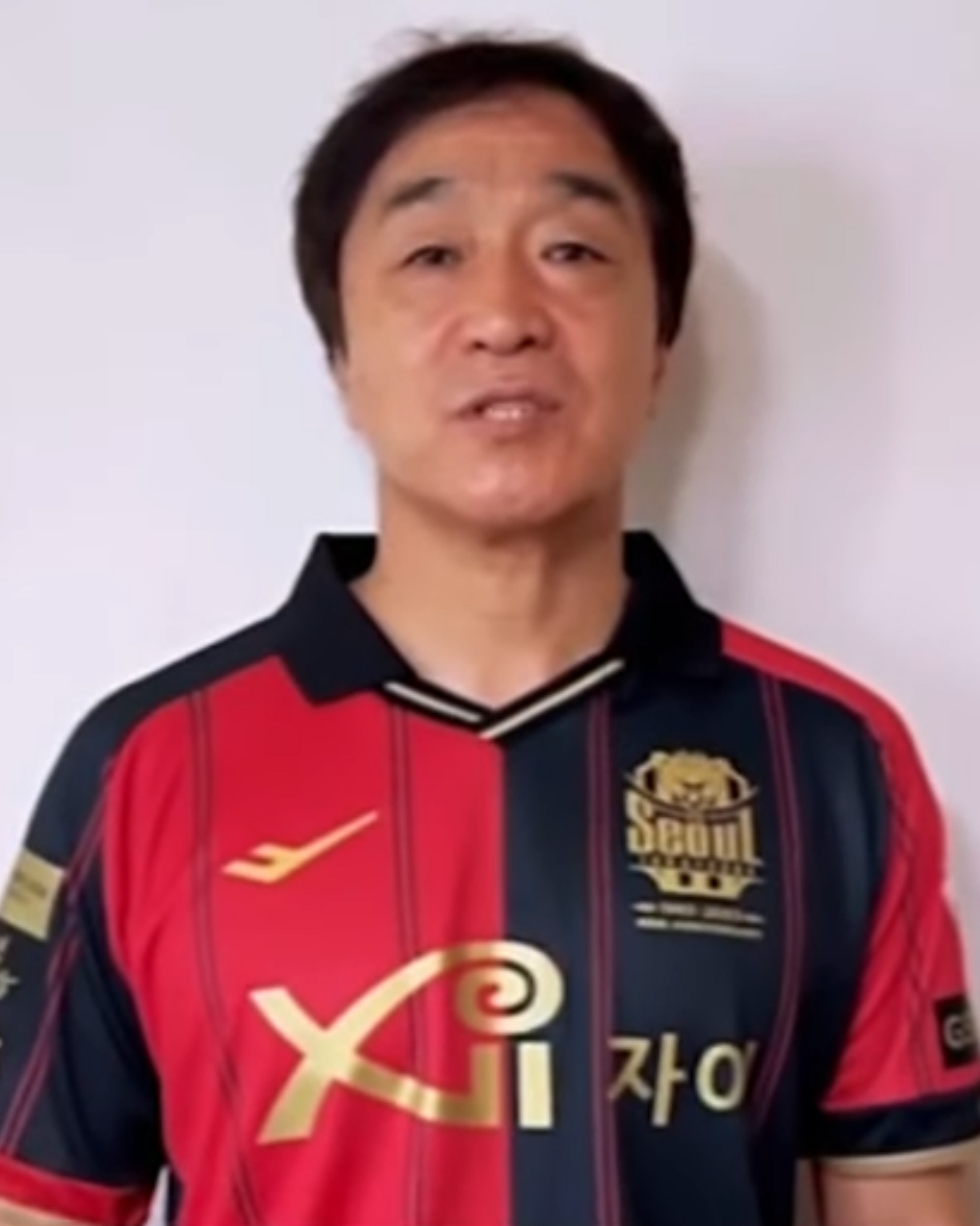
- Lee in 2023

Personal information
- Full name: Lee Young-jin
- Date of birth: 27 October 1963 (age 63)
- Place of birth: Seoul, South Korea
- Height: 1.71 m (5 ft 7 in)
- Position: Midfielder

Team information
- Current team: SHB Da Nang (head coach)

College career
Years	Team	Apps	(Gls)
1982–1985	Incheon National University		

Senior career*
Years	Team	Apps	(Gls)
1986–1995	LG Cheetahs	181	(10)
1990	→ Sangmu FC (draft)		
1996	Oita Trinita	0	(0)
1997	Anyang LG Cheetahs	5	(0)
Total		186	(10)

International career
1984–1989	South Korea B		
1989–1994	South Korea	51	(1)

Managerial career
- 2005: FC Seoul (assistant)
- 2007–2009: FC Seoul (assistant)
- 2010–2011: Daegu FC
- 2013–2014: Cheongju University
- 2015–2016: Daegu FC
- 2017–2023: Vietnam (assistant)
- 2017–2022: Vietnam U23 (assistant)
- 2022: Vietnam U23 (caretaker)
- 2026–: SHB Da Nang
Medal record
Men's football
Representing South Korea
Asian Games
Bronze medal – third place	1990 Beijing	Team
- * Club domestic league appearances and goals

- Lee Young-jin
- Hangul: 이영진
- Hanja: 李咏眞
- RR: I Yeongjin
- MR: I Yŏngjin

Lee Young-jin (Korean: 이영진; born 27 October 1963) is a South Korean football manager and former player. He mostly played for Lucky-Goldstar Hwangso (renamed LG Cheetahs in 1991 and Anyang LG Cheetahs in 1996). He is currently the head coach of SHB Da Nang.

== International career ==
Lee Young-jin made his debut appearance in the South Korea national team on 23 May 1989, in a 1990 FIFA World Cup qualifying match against Singapore.

He represented South Korea at the 1990 FIFA World Cup, 1994 FIFA World Cup, 1990 Asian Games and 1994 Asian Games.

== Managerial career ==
Lee started his coaching career as a player-coach at Anyang LG Cheetahs (renamed FC Seoul in 2004) in 1997. He also worked as an assistant coach in Şenol Güneş from 2007 to 2009.

On 22 December 2009, Daegu FC appointed Lee as manager. In the 2011 season, the club improved on previous season by finishing in 12th place, but the board decided that they terminated his contract.

On 24 November 2014, Lee returned to Daegu, which was a second division team at the time. He advanced to the promotion playoffs as the runner-up in the 2015 regular season, but failed to be promoted to the first division after losing to Suwon FC. On 12 August 2016, he resigned from Daegu due to poor results in the 2016 season.

In 2017, Lee became his former teammate Park Hang-seo's assistant and coached Vietnam national teams with him.

In November 2026, Lee was appointed head coach of V.League 1 club SHB Da Nang.

== Career statistics ==
=== International ===
Results list South Korea's goal tally first.

List of international goals scored by Lee Young-jin
No.	Date	Venue	Opponent	Score	Result	Competition
1	25 May 1989	Seoul, South Korea	Nepal	5–0	9–0	1990 FIFA World Cup qualification

== Honours ==
LG Cheetahs

- K League 1: 1990
- Korean National Championship: 1988
- Korean League Cup runner-up: 1992, 1994

South Korea

- Asian Games bronze medal: 1990
- Dynasty Cup: 1990

Individual

- K League 1 Best XI: 1991
- K League All-Star Game Most Valuable Player: 1991
- K League All-Star: 1991, 1992, 1995
- K League '90s All-Star Team: 2003

Sporting positions
Preceded by Choi Jin-han	LG Cheetahs captain 1991–1992	Succeeded by Gu Sang-bum
