= Choi Tae-jin =

South Korean footballer (born 1961)

Personal information
- Date of birth: May 14, 1961 (age 65)
- Place of birth: South Korea
- Height: 1.77 m (5 ft 9 1/2 in)
- Position: Defender

Youth career
- 1981–1985: Korea University

Senior career*
Years	Team	Apps	(Gls)
1985–1988	Daewoo Royals	61	(8)
1989–1992	Lucky-Goldstar / LG Cheetahs	105	(8)
- * Club domestic league appearances and goals as of 17 August 2011

- Choi Tae-jin
- Hangul: 최태진
- RR: Choe Taejin
- MR: Ch'oe T'aejin

Choi Tae-jin (born May 14, 1961) is a South Korean footballer.

He graduated in Korea University, and played for Daewoo Royals and LG Cheetahs.

== Honours ==
=== Player ===
Lucky-Goldstar Hwangso

- K-League Winners (1) : 1990

=== Individual ===
- K-League Best XI (1) : 1990
