= László Pecha =

Hungarian footballer (born 1963)

Personal information
- Full name: László Pecha
- Date of birth: 26 October 1963 (age 63)
- Place of birth: Hungary
- Height: 1.75 m (5 ft 9 in)
- Position: Midfielder

Senior career*
Years	Team	Apps	(Gls)
1980–1990	Vasas	168	(15)
1990–1991	POSCO Atoms	15	(0)
1991–1993	Vasas	47	(2)
1993	BVSC	3	(0)
1993–1994	Vasas	18	(0)
1994–1995	REAC	4	(0)
- * Club domestic league appearances and goals

László Pecha (born October 26, 1963) is a Hungarian footballer who played as a midfielder.

== Club career ==
In July 1990, he joined Pohang Steelers (then known as the POSCO Atoms) of the South Korean K League together with Géza Mészöly.
