= Choi Dae-shik =

South Korean footballer (1965–2024)

Choi Dae-Shik 최대식
Personal information
- Date of birth: January 10, 1965
- Place of birth: Hamyang County, South Korea
- Date of death: March 27, 2024 (aged 59)
- Place of death: Hamyang County, South Korea
- Height: 1.82 m (6 ft 0 in)
- Position: Midfielder

Youth career
- 1985–1987: Korea University

Senior career*
Years	Team	Apps	(Gls)
1988–1989	Daewoo Royals	23	(0)
1990–1995	Lucky-Goldstar / LG Cheetahs	151	(7)
1996–1999	Oita Trinita		

International career
1991–1995	South Korea	15	(0)

Managerial career
- 2003–2024: Kyungmin Information Industrial Technology High School
- * Club domestic league appearances and goals

Choi Dae-Shik (January 10, 1965 – March 27, 2024) was a South Korean footballer who played as a midfielder for Daewoo Royals (South Korea), LG Cheetahs (South Korea) and Oita Trinita (Japan). He was a participant at 1994 FIFA World Cup and 1994 Asian Games. He was also the manager of Kyungmin Information Industrial Technology High School football team.

== Death ==
Dae-shik died on March 27, 2024, at the age of 59.

== Career statistics ==
=== Club ===
Appearances and goals by club, season and competition
Club	Season	League		
Club	Season	Division	Apps	Goals
Daewoo Royals	1988	K-League	13	0
Daewoo Royals	1989	K-League	10	0
Daewoo Royals	Total		23	0
Lucky-Goldstar Hwangso	1990	K-League	29	4
LG Cheetahs	1991	K-League	38	0
LG Cheetahs	1992	K-League	34	1
LG Cheetahs	1993	K-League	31	2
LG Cheetahs	1994	K-League	12	0
LG Cheetahs	1995	K-League	22	1
LG Cheetahs	Total		137	4
Oita Trinity	1996	Football League		
Oita Trinity	1997	Football League		
Oita Trinity	1998	Football League		
Oita Trinity	1999	J2 League	31	4
Career total			220	12

=== International ===
Appearances and goals by national team and year
National team	Year	Apps	Goals
Korea Republic	1991	5	0
Korea Republic	1992	0	0
Korea Republic	1993	0	0
Korea Republic	1994	9	0
Korea Republic	1995	1	0
Total		15	0

== Honours ==
=== Player ===
Lucky-Goldstar Hwangso

- K League: 1990

Individual

- K League Top Assists Award: 1990
