= Han Moon-bae =

South Korean footballer (born 1954)

Personal information
- Full name: Han Moon-bae
- Date of birth: 22 March 1954 (age 72)
- Place of birth: South Korea
- Height: 1.80 m (5 ft 11 in)
- Position: Midfielder

College career
Years	Team	Apps	(Gls)
1974–1977	Hanyang University		

Senior career*
Years	Team	Apps	(Gls)
1978	Seoul Trust Bank		
1979–1980	ROK Navy (draft)		
1981–1983	Seoul Trust Bank		
1984–1986	Lucky-Goldstar Hwangso	60	(7)

International career^{‡}
1983	South Korea	1	(0)

Managerial career
- 1987–2006: Hanyang University
- 2007–2009: Suwon FMC
- * Club domestic league appearances and goals as of 17 August 2011 ‡ National team caps and goals as of 17 August 2011

Han Moon-bae (born 22 March 1954) is a former South Korean footballer. He graduated from Hanyang University, and played for Lucky-Goldstar Hwangso. He was the first captain of Lucky-Goldstar Hwangso, and the winner of the K League Most Valuable Player Award for 1985. After retiring, he managed Hanyang University and Suwon FMC.

== Honours ==
=== Player ===
Lucky-Goldstar Hwangso

- K League 1: 1985

Individual

- K League 1 Most Valuable Player: 1985
- K League 1 Best XI: 1985

=== Manager ===
Hanyang University

- Korean National Championship: 1992

Individual

- Korean National Championship Best Manager: 1992

Sporting positions
Preceded by Inaugural	Lucky-Goldstar Hwangso captain 1984	Succeeded by Kim Kwang-hoon
