= István Nyúl =

Hungarian footballer (born 1961)

Personal information
- Full name: István Nyúl
- Date of birth: 25 February 1961 (age 65)
- Place of birth: London, United Kingdom
- Height: 1.87 m (6 ft 2 in)
- Position: Forward

Senior career*
Years	Team	Apps	(Gls)
1981–1982	Budapest Honvéd		
1984	Volán SC		
1985–1988	Vasas SC		
1988–1989	Dunaújváros		
1989–1990	Vasas SC		
1990	Lucky-Goldstar Hwangso	6	(2)
- * Club domestic league appearances and goals

István Nyúl (born February 25, 1961) is a Hungarian footballer who played as a forward.

== Club career ==
He played for FC Seoul of the South Korean K League, then known as the Lucky-Goldstar Hwangso.
