= Park Jung-bae (footballer) =

South Korean footballer (born 1967)

Personal information
- Date of birth: 19 February 1967 (age 59)
- Place of birth: South Korea
- Height: 1.78 m (5 ft 10 in)
- Position: Defender

Senior career*
Years	Team	Apps	(Gls)
1990–1993	LG Cheetahs	102	(9)
1994–1996	Pusan Daewoo Royals	44	(1)
1997–1999	Ulsan Hyundai Horang-i	32	(0)
Total		178	(10)

International career
1991–1996	South Korea	36	(2)
- * Club domestic league appearances and goals

- Park Jung-bae
- Hangul: 박정배
- RR: Bak Jeongbae
- MR: Pak Chŏngbae

Park Jung-bae (born 19 February 1967) is a South Korean former international footballer who played professionally as a defender for LG Cheetahs, Pusan Daewoo Royals and Ulsan Hyundai Horang-i. He represented South Korea at the 1994 FIFA World Cup.
