= Lim Jong-heon =

South Korean footballer and coach

Lim Jong-heon 임종헌
Personal information
- Full name: Lim Jong-heon
- Date of birth: 8 March 1966 (age 60)
- Place of birth: South Korea
- Height: 1.74 m (5 ft 8 1/2 in)
- Position: Defender

Youth career
- 1985–1988: Korea University

Senior career*
Years	Team	Apps	(Gls)
1989–1993	Ilhwa Chunma	113	(0)
1994–1996	Hyundai Horangi / Ulsan Hyundai	46	(1)

International career
1984	South Korea U-20		
1987–1988	South Korea B		

Managerial career
- 1997–1999: Bupyeong High School (assistant)
- 2000–2001: Korea University (assistant)
- 2002–2003: Bupyeong High School
- 2004–2008: Ulsan Hyundai (assistant)
- 2010–2013: Yongho High School
- 2014: Ulsan Hyundai (assistant)
- 2015: Pattaya United
- 2017: Lijiang Jiayunhao
- 2019: Navy
- * Club domestic league appearances and goals

- Lim Jong-heon
- Hangul: 임종헌
- Hanja: 林鍾憲
- RR: Im Jongheon
- MR: Im Chonghŏn

Lim Jong-heon (Korean: 임종헌; born March 8, 1968) is a South Korean former footballer who played as a defender and currently the head coach of Lijiang Jiayunhao.

He started professional career at Ilhwa Chunma in 1989 and he transferred to Ulsan Hyundai in 1994.

He managed Pattya United and Pattaya promoted to Thai Premier League in 2016
