= Lim Keun-jae =

South Korean footballer and manager

Lim Keun-Jae 임근재
Personal information
- Full name: Lim Keun-Jae
- Date of birth: November 5, 1969 (age 56)
- Place of birth: South Korea
- Height: 1.70 m (5 ft 7 in)
- Position: Forward

Team information
- Current team: Seoul United / Daesin High School

Youth career
- Yonsei University

Senior career*
Years	Team	Apps	(Gls)
1992–1994	LG Cheetash	67	(25)
1995–1996	Pohang Atoms	6	(2)

Managerial career
- 1998–2003: Daesin High School (Coach)
- 2004–2006: Boin High School
- 2006: Daesin High School
- 2007–2008: Seoul United
- 2009–?: Seoul United (General Manager)
- * Club domestic league appearances and goals

Lim Keun-Jae (born November 5, 1969) is a South Korean football manager. He played for FC Seoul and Pohang Steelers then known as 'LG Cheetahs' and 'Pohang Atoms'.

== Club career statistics ==
Club performance			League		Cup		League Cup		Continental		Total	
Season	Club	League	Apps	Goals	Apps	Goals	Apps	Goals	Apps	Goals	Apps	Goals
South Korea			League		KFA Cup		League Cup		Asia		Total	
1992	LG Cheetash	K-League	30	10	-		7	0	-		37	10
1993	LG Cheetash	K-League	19	3	-		5	3	-		24	6
1994	LG Cheetash	K-League	18	2	-		6	0	-		24	2
1995	Pohang Atoms	K-League	2	0	-		0	0	-		2	0
1996	Pohang Atoms	K-League	4	0	?	?	0	0	-			
Total	South Korea		73	15			18	3	-			
Career total			73	15			18	3	-			

== Honours ==
=== Player ===
LG Cheeths

- K-League Cup Runners-up (1) : 1994

=== Manager ===
Seoul United

- K3 League Winners (1) : 2007

=== Individual ===
- K-League Top Scorer : 1992
