= Choi Jin-han =

South Korean footballer and manager (born 1961)

Personal information
- Full name: Choi Jin-han
- Date of birth: 22 June 1961 (age 65)
- Place of birth: Jinju, Gyeongnam, South Korea
- Position: Midfielder

Team information
- Current team: Jiangxi Lushan (head coach)

College career
Years	Team	Apps	(Gls)
1981–1984	Myongji University		

Senior career*
Years	Team	Apps	(Gls)
1985–1991	LG Cheetahs	142	(21)
1991–1992	Yukong Elephants	31	(14)
Total		173	(35)

International career
1984–1986	South Korea B		
1984–1987	South Korea	11	(0)

Managerial career
- 1993–1999: Kwandong University
- 2011–2013: Gyeongnam FC
- 2014–2015: Bucheon FC 1995
- 2018: Yanbian Beiguo
- 2020: Inner Mongolia Zhongyou
- 2022: Yuxi Yukun Steel
- 2026–: Jiangxi Lushan
- * Club domestic league appearances and goals

- Choi Jin-han
- Hangul: 최진한
- Hanja: 崔震澣
- RR: Choe Jinhan
- MR: Ch'oe Chinhan

Choi Jin-han (Korean: 최진한; born 22 June 1961) is a South Korean football manager and former player.

== Career statistics ==
=== Club ===
Appearances and goals by club, season and competition
Club	Season	League			League cup		Other		Total	
Club	Season	Division	Apps	Goals	Apps	Goals	Apps	Goals	Apps	Goals
LG Cheetahs	1985	K League	5	0	—		—		5	0
LG Cheetahs	1986	K League	14	4	9	0	1 (Note: Appearance in K League Championship)	0	24	4
LG Cheetahs	1987	K League	29	2	—		—		29	2
LG Cheetahs	1988	K League	23	4	—		—		23	4
LG Cheetahs	1989	K League	38	5	—		—		38	5
LG Cheetahs	1990	K League	27	6	—		—		27	6
LG Cheetahs	1991	K League	6	0	—		—		6	0
LG Cheetahs	Total		142	21	9	0	1	0	152	21
Yukong Elephants	1991	K League	18	12	—		—		18	12
Yukong Elephants	1992	K League	13	2	4	0	—		17	2
Yukong Elephants	Total		31	14	4	0	—		35	14
Career total			173	35	13	0	1	0	187	35

== Honours ==
=== Player ===
Myongji University

- Korean President's Cup: 1984

Lucky-Goldstar Hwangso

- K League 1: 1985, 1990
- Korean National Championship: 1988

Individual

- K League Best XI: 1988, 1990
- K League 1 Most Valuable Player: 1990

=== Manager ===
Gyeongnam FC

- Korean FA Cup runner-up: 2012

Sporting positions
Preceded by Jung Hae-seong	Lucky-Goldstar Hwangso captain 1989–1990	Succeeded by Lee Young-jin
