= Yoon Sang-chul =

South Korean footballer (born 1965)

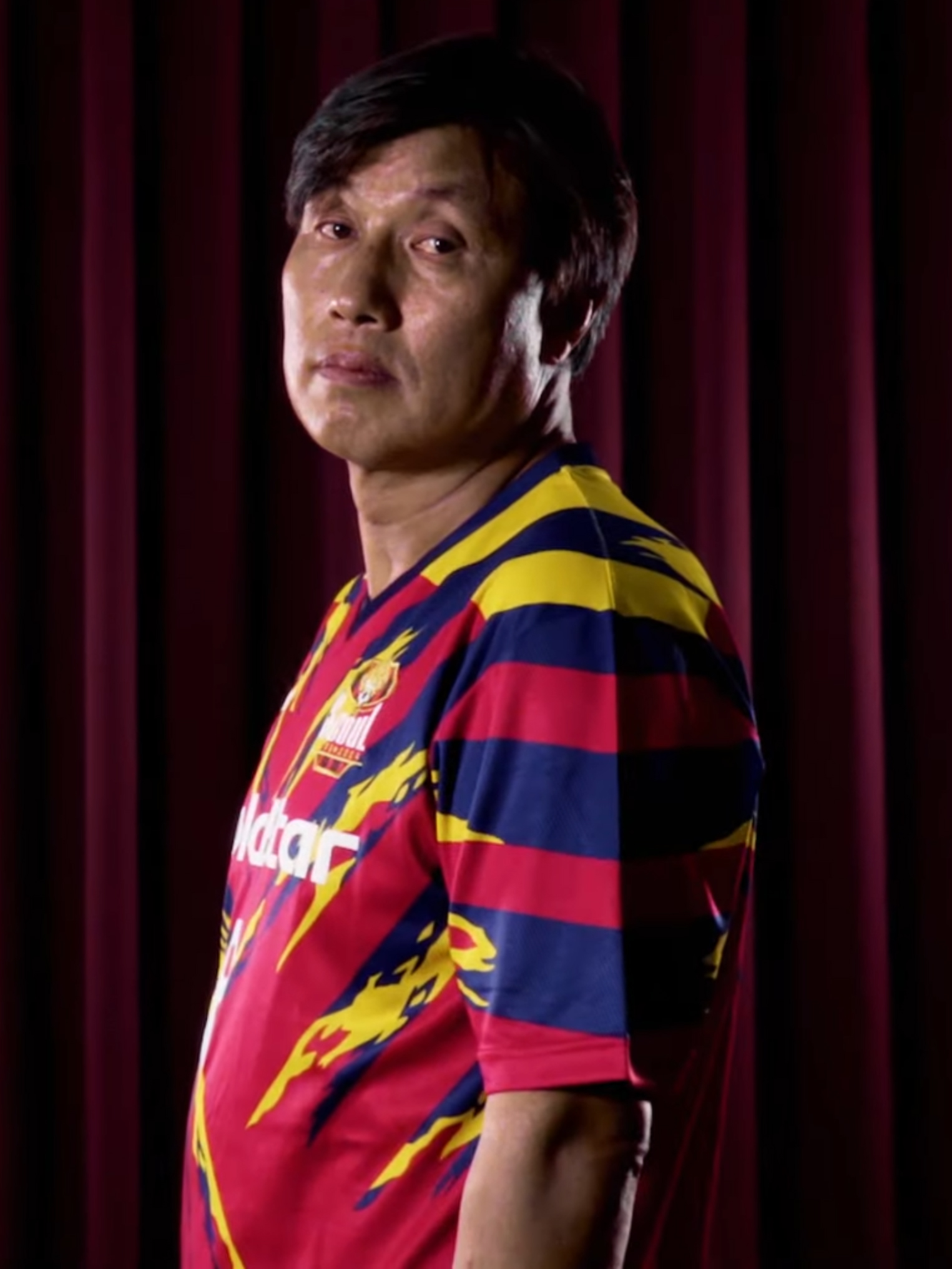
- Yoon in 2021

Personal information
- Date of birth: June 14, 1965 (age 61)
- Place of birth: Seoul, South Korea
- Height: 1.78 m (5 ft 10 in)
- Position: Forward

Youth career
- 1984–1987: Konkuk University

Senior career*
Years	Team	Apps	(Gls)
1988–1997	Lucky-Goldstar Hwangso; LG Cheetahs; Anyang LG Cheetahs	261	(92)
1998	Marconi Stallions	8	(0)
1998–1999	Newcastle Breakers	23	(3)

International career
1985–1993	South Korea B	32	(2)
1992–1995	South Korea	1	(0)
- * Club domestic league appearances and goals

- Yoon Sang-chul
- Hangul: 윤상철
- Hanja: 尹相喆
- RR: Yun Sangcheol
- MR: Yun Sangch'ŏl

Yoon Sang-chul (born June 14, 1965) is a South Korean former professional footballer who played as a forward, spending most of his career with FC Seoul. He was the first player to score 100 goals in the K League.

== Honours ==
=== Player ===
Lucky-Goldstar Hwangso / LG Cheetahs / Anyang LG Cheetahs

- K League: 1990; runner-up: 1989, 1993
- League Cup runner-up: 1992, 1994

=== Individual ===
- K League Top Scorer Award: 1990, 1994
- K League Top Assists Award: 1993
- K League Best XI: 1989, 1990, 1993, 1994
- K League Honorable Mention: 1993
