= 1990 K League =

Korean Professional Football League
- Season: 1990
- Dates: 17 March – 3 November 1990
- Champions: Lucky-Goldstar Hwangso (2nd title)
- Asian Club Championship: Withdrew
- Matches: 90
- Goals: 186 (2.07 per match)
- Best Player: Choi Jin-han
- Top goalscorer: Yoon Sang-chul (12 goals)
- Best goalkeeper: Yoo Dae-soon

The 1990 Korean Professional Football League was the eighth season of K League since its establishment in 1983. The South Korean clubs relocated their hometowns from provinces to cities in this year. Daewoo Royals also hired Frank Engel, the first foreign head coach in the league.

== Foreign players ==
Team	Player 1	Player 2
Daewoo Royals		
Hyundai Horang-i		
Ilhwa Chunma	(Romania) Marcel Lăzăreanu	
Lucky-Goldstar Hwangso	(Hungary) István Nyúl	
POSCO Atoms	(Hungary) Géza Mészöly	(Hungary) László Pecha
Yukong Elephants	(Poland) Tadeusz Świątek	(Poland) Witold Bendkowski

== League table ==
Pos	Team	Pld	W	D	L	GF	GA	GD	Pts
1	Lucky-Goldstar Hwangso (C)	30	14	11	5	40	25	+15	39
2	Daewoo Royals	30	12	11	7	30	25	+5	35
3	POSCO Atoms	30	9	10	11	29	28	+1	28
4	Yukong Elephants	30	8	12	10	27	30	−3	28
5	Hyundai Horang-i	30	6	14	10	32	38	−6	26
6	Ilhwa Chunma	30	7	10	13	28	40	−12	24

Source: RSSSF
(C) Champions

== Awards ==
=== Main awards ===
Award	Winner	Club
Most Valuable Player	(South Korea) Choi Jin-han	Lucky-Goldstar Hwangso
Top goalscorer	(South Korea) Yoon Sang-chul	Lucky-Goldstar Hwangso
Top assist provider	(South Korea) Choi Dae-shik	Lucky-Goldstar Hwangso
Rookie of the Year	(South Korea) Song Ju-seok	Hyundai Horang-i
Manager of the Year	(South Korea) Ko Jae-wook	Lucky-Goldstar Hwangso
Best Goalkeeper	(South Korea) Yoo Dae-soon	Yukong Elephants
Fighting Spirit Award	(South Korea) Choi Tae-jin	Lucky-Goldstar Hwangso
Exemplary Award	(South Korea) Lee Tae-ho	Daewoo Royals
Best Referee	(South Korea) Gil Gi-cheol	—

=== Best XI ===
Position	Winner	Club
Goalkeeper	(South Korea) Yoo Dae-soon	Yukong Elephants
Defenders	(South Korea) Lim Jong-heon	Ilhwa Chunma
Defenders	(South Korea) Choi Young-jun	Lucky-Goldstar Hwangso
Defenders	(South Korea) Choi Tae-jin	Lucky-Goldstar Hwangso
Defenders	(South Korea) Lee Jae-hee	Daewoo Royals
Midfielders	(South Korea) Choi Jin-han	Lucky-Goldstar Hwangso
Midfielders	(South Korea) Lee Heung-sil	POSCO Atoms
Midfielders	(South Korea) Choi Dae-shik	Lucky-Goldstar Hwangso
Forwards	(South Korea) Yoon Sang-chul	Lucky-Goldstar Hwangso
Forwards	(South Korea) Lee Tae-ho	Daewoo Royals
Forwards	(South Korea) Song Ju-seok	Hyundai Horang-i
