= 1991 K League =

Korean Professional Football League
- Season: 1991
- Dates: 30 March – 3 November 1991
- Champions: Daewoo Royals (3rd title)
- Asian Club Championship: Withdrew
- Matches: 120
- Goals: 269 (2.24 per match)
- Best Player: Chung Yong-hwan
- Top goalscorer: Lee Kee-keun (16 goals)

The 1991 Korean Professional Football League was the ninth season of K League since its establishment in 1983.

== Foreign players ==
Team	Player 1	Player 2	Former player (s)
Daewoo Royals	(Socialist Federal Republic of Yugoslavia) Nebojša Vučićević		(Hungary) Zoltán Aczél
Hyundai Horang-i			
Ilhwa Chunma	(Romania) Marcel Lăzăreanu		
LG Cheetahs	(Hungary) Lajos Zentai		
POSCO Atoms	(Australia) Greg Brown		(Hungary) Géza Mészöly (Hungary) László Pecha
Yukong Elephants	(Poland) Tadeusz Świątek	(Poland) Witold Bendkowski	

== League table ==
Pos	Team	Pld	W	D	L	GF	GA	GD	Pts
1	Daewoo Royals (C)	40	17	18	5	49	32	+17	52
2	Hyundai Horang-i	40	13	16	11	36	34	+2	42
3	POSCO Atoms	40	12	15	13	46	47	−1	39
4	Yukong Elephants	40	10	17	13	38	40	−2	37
5	Ilhwa Chunma	40	13	11	16	56	63	−7	37
6	LG Cheetahs	40	9	15	16	44	53	−9	33

Source: RSSSF
(C) Champions

== Awards ==
=== Main awards ===
Award	Winner	Club
Most Valuable Player	(South Korea) Chung Yong-hwan	Daewoo Royals
Top goalscorer	(South Korea) Lee Kee-keun	POSCO Atoms
Top assist provider	(South Korea) Kim Jun-hyun	Yukong Elephants
Rookie of the Year	(South Korea) Cho Woo-seok	Ilhwa Chunma
Manager of the Year	(Hungary) Bertalan Bicskei	Daewoo Royals
Best Defender/Goalkeeper	(South Korea) Park Hyun-yong	Daewoo Royals
Fighting Spirit Award	(South Korea) Choi Jin-han	Yukong Elephants
Exemplary Award	(South Korea) Chung Yong-hwan	Daewoo Royals
Fair Play Award	Hyundai Horang-i	

=== Best XI ===
Position	Winner	Club
Goalkeeper	(South Korea) Kim Poong-joo	Daewoo Royals
Defenders	(South Korea) Chung Yong-hwan	Daewoo Royals
Defenders	(South Korea) Park Hyun-yong	Daewoo Royals
Defenders	(Poland) Tadeusz Świątek	Yukong Elephants
Midfielders	(South Korea) Kim Hyun-seok	Hyundai Horang-i
Midfielders	(South Korea) Lee Young-jin	LG Cheetahs
Midfielders	(South Korea) Kim Joo-sung	Daewoo Royals
Midfielders	(South Korea) Choi Kang-hee	Hyundai Horang-i
Midfielders	(South Korea) Lee Sang-yoon	Ilhwa Chunma
Forwards	(South Korea) Lee Kee-keun	POSCO Atoms
Forwards	(South Korea) Ko Jeong-woon	Ilhwa Chunma
