= List of FC Seoul records and statistics =

Below are statistics and records related to FC Seoul.

== Honours ==
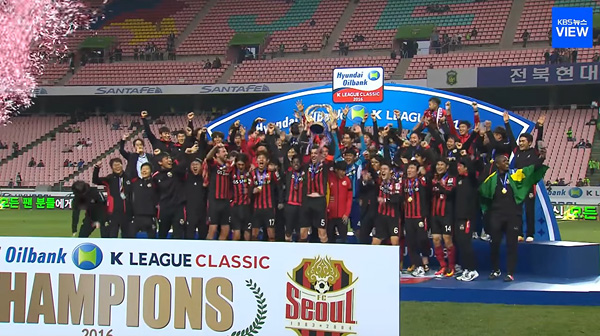
FC Seoul players celebrating after winning the 2016 K League Classic.

=== Domestic competitions ===
==== League ====
- K League 1

Winners (6): 1985, 1990, 2000, 2010, 2012, 2016
Runners-up (5): 1986, 1989, 1993, 2001, 2008

==== Cups ====
- FA Cup

Winners (2): 1998, 2015
Runners-up (3): 2014, 2016, 2022

- League Cup

Winners (2): 2006, 2010
Runners-up (4): 1992, 1994, 1999, 2007

- Super Cup

Winners (1): 2001
Runners-up (1): 1999

- National Football Championship

Winners (1): 1988

=== International competitions ===
==== Asian ====
- AFC Champions League

Runners-up (2): 2001–02, 2013

=== Friendly competitions ===
- Saitama City Cup

Winners (1): 2017

=== Doubles ===
- Domestic double

K League and League Cup Champions (1): 2010

== Team ==
=== Season-by-season records ===
※ K League: Only regular season results are counted. Postseason (League Championship and Promotion-relegation PO) results are not included.
※ 1993, 1998, 1999, 2000 seasons had penalty shoot-outs instead of draws.
※ A: Adidas Cup, P: Prospecs Cup, PM: Philip Morris Cup, D: Daehan Fire Insurance Cup

Season	K League											League Cup	FA Cup	Super Cup	ACL	Manager
Season	Division	Teams	Position	Pld	W	D	L	GF	GA	GD	Pts	League Cup	FA Cup	Super Cup	ACL	Manager
1984	Div 1	8	7th	28	8	6	14	38	45	–7	33					(South Korea) Park Se-hak
1985	Div 1	8	Champions	21	10	7	4	35	19	+16	27					(South Korea) Park Se-hak
1986	Div 1	6	Runners-up	20	10	7	3	28	17	+11	27	5th (Pro)			Did not qualify	(South Korea) Park Se-hak
1987	Div 1	5	5th	32	7	7	18	26	55	–29	21	No competition			Withdrew	(South Korea) Park Se-hak
1988	Div 1	5	4th	24	6	11	7	22	29	–7	23	No competition	Winners (Nat'l) (Note: In 1988 and 1989, the competition was known as the National Football Championship)		Did not qualify	(South Korea) Ko Jae-wook (C)
1989	Div 1	6	Runners-up	40	15	17	8	53	40	+13	47	No competition	Semi-finals (Nat'l)		Did not qualify	(South Korea) Ko Jae-wook
1990	Div 1	6	Champions	30	14	11	5	40	25	+15	39	No competition			Did not qualify	(South Korea) Ko Jae-wook
1991	Div 1	6	6th	40	9	15	16	44	53	–9	33	No competition			Did not qualify	(South Korea) Ko Jae-wook
1992	Div 1	6	4th	30	8	13	9	30	35	–5	29	Runners-up (Ad.)			Did not enter	(South Korea) Ko Jae-wook
1993	Div 1	6	Runners-up	30	18 (10)	0 (11)	12 (9)	28	29	–1	59	4th (Ad.)			Did not qualify	(South Korea) Ko Jae-wook
1994	Div 1	7	5th	30	12	7	11	53	50	+3	43	Runners-up (Ad.)			Did not qualify	(South Korea) Cho Young-jeung
1995	Div 1	8	8th	28	5	10	13	29	43	–14	25	6th (Ad.)			Did not qualify	(South Korea) Cho Young-jeung
1996	Div 1	9	9th	32	8	8	16	44	56	–12	32	8th (Ad.)	Round of 16		Did not qualify	(South Korea) Cho Young-jeung (South Korea) Park Hang-seo (C)
1997	Div 1	10	9th	18	1	8	9	15	27	–12	11	10th (Ad.); 3rd in Group A (P)	Semi-finals		Did not qualify	(South Korea) Park Byung-joo
1998	Div 1	10	8th	18	9 (8)	0 (2)	9 (8)	28	28	0	23	Semi-finals (Ad.); 3rd (PM)	Winners		Did not qualify	(South Korea) Park Byung-joo
1999	Div 1	10	9th	27	10 (8)	0 (4)	17 (15)	38	52	–14	24	Runners-up (Ad.); 4th in Group B (D)	Semi-finals	Runners-up	Did not qualify	(South Korea) Cho Kwang-rae
2000	Div 1	10	Champions	27	19 (17)	0 (5)	8 (5)	46	25	+21	53	Semi-finals (Ad.); 5th in Group A (D)	Quarter-finals	Did not qualify	Quarter-finals (Note: In 2000, the competition was known as the 1999–2000 Asian Cup Winners' Cup)	(South Korea) Cho Kwang-rae
2001	Div 1	10	Runners-up	27	11	10	6	30	23	+7	43	4th in Group A (Ad.)	Quarter-finals	Winners	Did not qualify	(South Korea) Cho Kwang-rae
2002	Div 1	10	4th	27	11	7	9	37	30	+7	40	Semi-finals (Ad.)	Round of 32	Did not qualify	Runners-up (Note: In 2002, the competition was known as the 2001–02 Asian Club Championship)	(South Korea) Cho Kwang-rae
2003	Div 1	12	8th	44	14	14	16	69	68	+1	56	No competition	Round of 32	No competition	Did not qualify	(South Korea) Cho Kwang-rae
2004	Div 1	13	5th	24	7	12	5	20	17	+3	33	12th (Sam.)	Round of 16	Did not qualify	Did not qualify	(South Korea) Cho Kwang-rae
2005	Div 1	13	7th	24	8	8	8	37	32	+5	32	5th (Sam.)	Round of 16	Did not qualify	Did not qualify	(South Korea) Lee Jang-soo
2006	Div 1	14	4th	26	9	12	5	31	22	+9	39	Winners (Sam.)	Quarter-finals	Did not qualify	Did not qualify	(South Korea) Lee Jang-soo
2007	Div 1	14	7th	26	8	13	5	23	16	+7	37	Runners-up (Sam.)	Quarter-finals	Competition ceased	Did not qualify	(Turkey) Şenol Güneş
2008	Div 1	14	Runners-up	26	15	9	2	44	25	+19	54	3rd in Group A (Sam.)	Round of 32	Competition ceased	Did not qualify	(Turkey) Şenol Güneş
2009	Div 1	15	5th	28	16	5	7	47	27	+20	53	Semi-finals (PC)	Round of 16	Competition ceased	Quarter-finals	(Turkey) Şenol Güneş
2010	Div 1	15	Champions	28	20	2	6	58	26	+32	62	Winners (PO)	Round of 16	Competition ceased	Did not qualify	(Portugal) Nelo Vingada
2011	Div 1	16	5th	30	16	7	7	56	38	+18	55	Quarter-finals (RC)	Quarter-finals	Competition ceased	Quarter-finals	(South Korea) Hwangbo Kwan (South Korea) Choi Yong-soo (C)
2012	Div 1	16	Champions	44	29	9	6	76	42	+34	96	Competition ceased	Round of 16	Competition ceased	Did not qualify	(South Korea) Choi Yong-soo
2013	Div 1	14	4th	38	17	11	10	59	46	+13	62	Competition ceased	Quarter-finals	Competition ceased	Runners-up	(South Korea) Choi Yong-soo
2014	Div 1	12	3rd	38	15	13	10	42	28	+14	58	Competition ceased	Runners-up	Competition ceased	Semi-finals	(South Korea) Choi Yong-soo
2015	Div 1	12	4th	38	17	11	10	52	44	+8	62	Competition ceased	Winners	Competition ceased	Round of 16	(South Korea) Choi Yong-soo
2016	Div 1	12	Champions	38	21	7	10	67	46	+21	70	Competition ceased	Runners-up	Competition ceased	Semi-finals	(South Korea) Choi Yong-soo (South Korea) Hwang Sun-hong
2017	Div 1	12	5th	38	16	13	9	56	42	+14	61	Competition ceased	Round of 16	Competition ceased	Group stage	(South Korea) Hwang Sun-hong
2018	Div 1	12	11th	38	9	13	16	40	48	–8	40	Competition ceased	Round of 16	Competition ceased	Did not qualify	(South Korea) Hwang Sun-hong (South Korea) Lee Eul-yong (C) (South Korea) Choi Yong-soo
2019	Div 1	12	3rd	38	15	11	12	53	49	+4	56	Competition ceased	Round of 32	Competition ceased	Did not qualify	(South Korea) Choi Yong-soo
2020	Div 1	12	9th	27	8	5	14	23	44	–21	29	Competition ceased	Quarter-finals	Competition ceased	Group stage	(South Korea) Choi Yong-soo (South Korea) Kim Ho-young (C) (South Korea) Park Hyuk-soon (C) (South Korea) Lee Won-jun (C)
2021	Div 1	12	7th	38	12	11	15	46	46	0	47	Competition ceased	Third round	Competition ceased	Did not qualify	(South Korea) Park Jin-sub (South Korea) An Ik-soo
2022	Div 1	12	9th	38	11	13	14	43	47	–4	46	Competition ceased	Runners-up	Competition ceased	Did not qualify	(South Korea) An Ik-soo

==== K League Championship records ====
Season	Teams	Position	Pld	W	D	L	GF	GA	GD	PSO	Manager
1986	2	Runners-up	2	0	1	1	1	2	–1	N/A	(South Korea) Park Se-hak
2000	4	Winners	2	1	1	0	5	2	+3	4–2 W	(South Korea) Cho Kwang-rae
2006	4	4th (semi-finals)	1	0	0	1	0	1	–1	N/A	(South Korea) Lee Jang-soo
2008	6	Runners-up	3	1	1	1	6	5	+1	N/A	(Turkey) Şenol Güneş
2009	6	5th (round of 6)	1	0	1	0	1	1	0	2–3 L	(Turkey) Şenol Güneş
2010	6	Champions	2	1	1	0	4	3	+1	N/A	(Portugal) Nelo Vingada
2011	6	5th (round of 6)	1	0	0	1	1	3	–2	N/A	(South Korea) Choi Yong-soo (C)

==== K League promotion-relegation playoffs ====
Season	Teams	Outcome	Pld	W	D	L	GF	GA	GD	PSO	Manager
2018	2	Remained	2	1	1	0	4	2	+2	N/A	(South Korea) Choi Yong-soo

=== All-time competitions records ===
※ As of 31 December 2016
※ Walkover results are counted.
※ Penalty shoot-outs results are counted as a drawn match.

Competition	Category	Season	Pld	W	D	L	GF	GA	GD	Win%	Notes
K League	K League 1	1984–2016	991	393	303	295	1362	1173	+189	39.66%	
K League	League Cup	1986–2011	197	73	57	67	252	238	+14	37.06%	
K League	Total	1984–2016	1,188	466	360	362	1,614	1,411	+203	39.23%	
FA Cup	N/A	1996–2016	57	32	9	16	113	70	+43	56.14%	
National Football Championship	N/A	1988, 1989	7	6	0	1	13	5	+8	85.71%	
Korean Super Cup	N/A	1999, 2001	2	1	0	1	3	6	–3	50.00%	
AFC Champions League	Main tournament	1986–2016	72	30	26	16	119	76	+43	41.67%	1986 Asian Club Championship; Walkover (one defeat) included
AFC Champions League	Qualifying play-offs	2014	1	1	0	0	7	0	+7	100.00%	
AFC Champions League	Total	1986–2016	73	31	26	16	126	76	+50	42.47%	
Asian Cup Winners' Cup	N/A	1999–2000	4	2	0	2	2	5	–3	50.00%	1999–2000 Asian Cup Winners' Cup; Walkover (two wins) included
All-time competitions Total			1,331	538	395	398	1,871	1,573	+298	40.42%	

=== All-time K League 1 results by opponents ===
※ As of 1984–2013 seasons

Club	Season	Pld	W	D	L	GF	GA	GD	Win%	Notes
(South Korea) Pohang Steelers	1983–present	139	45	44	50	184	206	–22	32.37%	
(South Korea) Jeju United	1983–present	137	52	44	41	179	157	+22	37.96%	
(South Korea) Busan IPark	1983–present	139	51	45	43	176	158	+18	36.69%	
(South Korea) Ulsan Hyundai	1983–present	139	46	44	49	164	171	–7	33.09%	
(South Korea) Seongnam Ilhwa Chunma	1989–present	107	31	37	39	130	143	–13	28.97%	
(South Korea) Jeonbuk Hyundai Motors	1995–present	67	29	20	18	108	89	+19	43.28%	
(South Korea) Jeonnam Dragons	1995–present	65	27	22	16	90	68	+22	41.54%	
(South Korea) Suwon Samsung Bluewings	1996–present	68	22	16	30	76	95	–19	32.35%	
(South Korea) Daejeon Citizen	1997–present	52	22	18	12	72	53	+19	42.31%	
(South Korea) Daegu FC	2003–present	28	13	7	8	47	27	+20	46.34%	
(South Korea) Incheon United	2004–present	30	11	13	6	45	33	+12	36.67%	
(South Korea) Gyeongnam FC	2006–present	24	12	6	6	31	21	+10	50.00%	
(South Korea) Gangwon FC	2009–present	10	9	0	1	26	12	+14	90.00%	
(South Korea) Gwangju FC	2011–present	4	3	0	1	9	5	+4	75.00%	
(South Korea) Sangju Sangmu	2011–present	4	4	0	0	10	5	+5	100.00%	
(South Korea) Kookmin Bank FC	1983–1984	4	2	2	0	6	2	+4	50.00%	
(South Korea) Hallelujah FC	1983–1985	7	3	1	3	9	7	+2	42.86%	
(South Korea) Hanil Bank FC	1984–1986	11	8	1	2	26	9	+17	72.73%	
(South Korea) Sangmu	1985	3	1	2	0	3	2	+1	33.33%	
(South Korea) Jeonbuk Buffalo	1994	6	6	0	0	17	5	+12	100.00%	
(South Korea) Gwangju Sangmu	2003–2010	24	15	5	4	38	14	+24	62.50%	
Total		1036	396	318	322	1394	1247	+147	38.22%	

=== All-time K League 1 records ===
※ 1984–2012 seasons ※ Penalty shoot-outs results are not counted as a drawn match

PTS	W	D	L	GF	GA	AS	GK	CK	FC	OS	ST	PK	PG	PM	Cautions	Expulsions
1,402	419	277	340	1,394	1,247	936	8,978	5,028	16,685	2,744	12,720	119	87	32	1,639	47

=== Firsts ===
Records	Name	Competition	Date	Opponent	H / A	Result	Notes
First Goal	(South Korea) Park Chung-il	K League 1	1984-03-01	Hallelujah FC	N	1–0	
First Assist	(South Korea) Kang Deuk-soo	K League 1	1984-03-01	Hallelujah FC	N	1–0	

=== Mosts in goals ===
Goals	Competition	Date	Opponent	H / A	Result	Notes
10	FA Cup	2004-12-14	(South Korea) Paju Bumwoo	N	10–1	
8	AFC Champions League	2001-11-21	(Bangladesh) Muktijoddha Sangsad	H	8–0	
7	K League 1	2023-07-12	(South Korea) Suwon FC	H	7–2	

=== Mosts in goal difference ===
Category	Record	Competition	Date	Opponent	H / A	Result	Notes
Biggest Wins	9	FA Cup	2004-12-14	(South Korea) Paju Bumwoo	N	10–1	
Biggest Wins	8	AFC Champions League	2001-11-21	(Bangladesh) Muktijoddha Sangsad	H	8–0	
Biggest Wins	6	K League 1	2012-07-21	(South Korea) Busan IPark	H	6–0	
Heaviest Defeats	6	K League 1	1987-10-10	(South Korea) POSCO Atoms	H	1–7	
Heaviest Defeats	6	League Cup	1997-04-12	(South Korea) Bucheon SK	A	1–7	

=== Most consecutive records ===
※ 1984–2013 seasons

Category	Matches	Period	Notes
Wins	7	2011/07/09–2011/08/27, 2013/07/07–2013/08/15	
Draws	10	1997/05/10–1997/07/13	
Losses	7	1997/09/20–1998/03/21	
Wins in Regular Season	7	2011/07/09–2011/08/27	
Losses in Regular Season	7	1997/09/20–1998/03/21	
Wins in Extra Time	2	1998/09/27–1998/10/01, 1999/09/15–1999/09/18	
Losses in Extra Time	2	1999/08/25–1999/08/28	
Wins by PSO	2	1993/04/17–1993/04/24, 1993/09/08–1993/09/11	
Losses by PSO	N/A		
Wins with Clean Sheets	4	2007/03/04–2007/03/18	
Scoring	31	1989/09/23–1990/09/01	
Non-Scoring	4	2006/04/08–2006/04/30	
Without a Win	21	1997/03/22–1997/07/13	
Without a Loss	17	2000/05/14–2000/07/29, 2008/06/28–2008/10/29	
Conceding a Goal	21	2010/10/09-2011/06/11	
Without Conceding a Goal	4	1986/04/13–1986/05/07, 2001/07/22–2001/08/01, 2006/03/19–2006/04/02; 2006/05/20–2006/05/31, 2007/03/04–2007/03/18, 2007/05/16–2007/05/26; 2013/09/01-2013/10/06	

=== Historic victory ===
※ Only matches in K League 1 and League Cup are counted.

Record	Date	Competition	Opponent	H / A	Result	Notes
1st Victory	1984-03-31	K League 1	(South Korea) Hallelujah FC	N	1–0	First match
100th Victory	1993-08-14	K League 1	(South Korea) Daewoo Royals	A	1–3	308 matches
200th Victory	2001-08-29	K League 1	(South Korea) Ulsan Hyundai Horangi	H	4–0	610 matches
300th Victory	2008-08-30	K League 1	(South Korea) Gwangju Sangmu	H	3–1	876 matches
400th Victory	2013-06-01	K League 1	(South Korea) Jeonnam Dragons	H	3–0	1049 matches

=== Historic goal ===
※ Only matches in K League 1 and League Cup are counted.

Record	Name	Date	Competition	Opponent	H / A	Result	Notes
1st Goal	(South Korea) Park Chung-il	1984-03-31	K League 1	(South Korea) Hallelujah FC	N	1–0	
100th Goal	(South Korea) Lee Young-jin	1986-10-12	K League 1	(South Korea) POSCO Atoms	N	5–1	
1000th Goal	(South Korea) Kwak Tae-hwi	2006-06-03	League Cup	(South Korea) Pohang Steelers	H	3–4	
1500th Goal	(South Korea) Kim Hyun-sung	2015-04-15	K League 1	(South Korea) Daejeon Citizen	H	1–0	

== Players ==
※ Statistics correct as of last match played in 2015 season.
※ Bold denotes players still playing in the K League
※ Appearance, Goals, Clean Sheets, Goals conceded per Match records included FA Cup and Asian Club Competitions, Other competitive competitions.
※ Other competitive competitions are as below:

- K League unofficial matches: 1986 K League Championship - 2 matches, 1992 League Cup Final - 2 matches
- 1999 Korean Super Cup - 1 match, 2001 Korean Super Cup - 1 match
- 1988 Korean National Football Championship - 4 matches, 1989 Korean National Football Championship - 3 matches
- 2018 K League promotion-relegation playoffs - 2 matches

※ Assists and Attack Points records only includes K League 1 and Korean League Cup.
※ Attack Points are the aggregate number of goals assists in K League 1 and Korean League Cup.

=== Appearances ===
※ FC Seoul players with at least 200 appearances.
※ As of May 3, 2019

Rank	Name	Total Appearances	K League	League	League Cup	FA Cup	Asia	Other	Seasons	Notes
1	(South Korea) **Go Yo-han**	370	292	280	10	23	55	2	2004–present	
2	(Montenegro) Dejan Damjanović	330	267	254	13	17	46	N/A	2008–2013; 2016–2017	
3	(South Korea) Yoon Sang-chul	306+?	300	261	39	1	0	5+?	1988–1997	
4	(Brazil) Adilson dos Santos	305	264	226	38	29	12	N/A	2006–2013	
5	(South Korea) Koh Myong-jin	283	227	204	23	17	39	N/A	2003-2015	
6	(South Korea) Kim Jin-kyu	270	220	205	15	15	35	N/A	2007–2010; 2012–2015	
7	(South Korea) Jung Jo-gook	266	239	186	53	14	13	N/A	2003–2010; 2012; 2014–2015	
8	(South Korea) **Park Chu-young**	240	204	189	22	13	14	2	2005–2008; 2015–present	
9	(South Korea) Kim Chi-woo	231	180	176	4	13	38	N/A	2008–2010; 2012–2017	
10	(South Korea) Lee Young-jin	229+?	220	186	34	0	0	9+?	1986–1995; 1997	
11	(South Korea) Kim Yong-dae	222	181	174	7	9	32	N/A	2010–2015	
12	(South Korea) Kim Seong-jae	217	203	157	46	11	2	1	1999–2005	
13	(Colombia) Mauricio Molina	205	159	159	0	14	32	N/A	2011–2015	
14	(South Korea) Kim Chi-gon	200	182	148	34	6	12	N/A	2002–2009	

=== Goals ===
Rank	Name	Total Goals	K League	League	League Cup	FA Cup	Asia	Other	Total Apps	Goals per Match	Seasons	Notes
1	(Montenegro) Dejan Damjanović	143	122	116	6	4	17	N/A	236	0.61	2008–2013; 2016–2017	
2	(South Korea) Yoon Sang-chul	102	101	92	9	0	0	1	306+?	0.33-?	1988–1997	
3	(South Korea) Jung Jo-gook	84	68	55	13	10	6	N/A	266	0.32	2003–2010; 2012; 2014–2015	
4	(South Korea) **Park Chu-young**	74	65	54	10	6	3	1	240	0.30	2005–2008; 2015–present	
5	(South Korea) Choi Yong-soo	60	54	44	10	5	1	N/A	154	0.39	1994–1996; 1999–2000; 2006	
6	(Colombia) Mauricio Molina	54	46	46	0	4	4	N/A	205	0.26	2011–2015	
7	(Brazil) Adriano	45	25	25	N/A	7	13	N/A	62	0.72	2015–2016	
8	(South Korea) Kim Eun-jung	41	38	28	10	3	0	N/A	139	0.29	2004–2008	
9	(South Korea) Jung Kwang-min	36	34	21	13	2	0	0	159	0.23	1998–2002; 2007	
10	(South Korea) Seo Jung-won	26	22	13	9	4	0	N/A	88	0.30	1992–1997	

=== Assists ===
Rank	Name	Assists	Apps	Assists per Match	Seasons	Notes
1	(Colombia) Mauricio Molina	58	159	0.36	2011–2015	
2	(South Korea) Kang Deuk-soo	34	139	0.24	1984–1989	
3	(Montenegro) Dejan Damjanović	33	194	0.17	2008–2013; 2016–2017	
4	(South Korea) Yoon Sang-chul	31	300	0.10	1988–1997	
5	(South Korea) Choi Dae-shik	28	166	0.17	1990–1995	
5	(South Korea) Lee Young-jin	28	220	0.13	1986–1995; 1997	
7	(Brazil) André Luís Alves Santos	27	96	0.28	2000–2002	
8	(South Korea) Choi Yong-soo	26	148	0.18	1994–1996; 1999–2000; 2006	
9	(South Korea) Choi Tae-uk	24	172	0.14	2000–2003; 2010–2013	
10	(Portugal) Ricardo Nascimento	23	71	0.32	2005–2007	

=== Attack points ===
Rank	Name	Attack Points	Apps	Attack Points per Match	Seasons	Notes
1	(Montenegro) Dejan Damjanović	155	194	0.80	2008–2013; 2016–2017	
2	(South Korea) Yoon Sang-chul	132	300	0.44	1988–1997	
3	(Colombia) Mauricio Molina	104	159	0.65	2011–2015	
4	(South Korea) Jung Jo-gook	88	239	0.37	2003–2010; 2012; 2014–2015	
5	(South Korea) Choi Yong-soo	80	148	0.54	1994–1996; 1999–2000; 2006	
6	(South Korea) Kim Eun-jung	58	133	0.44	2004–2008	
7	(South Korea) Kang Deuk-soo	54	139	0.44	1984–1989	
8	(South Korea) **Park Chu-young**	51	114	0.45	2005–2008; 2015–present	
9	(South Korea) Jung Kwang-min	48	145	0.33	1998–2002; 2007	
10	(Brazil) André Luís Alves Santos	45	96	0.47	2000–2002	

=== Clean sheets ===
Rank	Name	Total Clean Sheets	K League	League	League Cup	FA Cup	Asia	Other	Total Apps	Clean Sheets per Match	Seasons	Notes
1	(South Korea) Kim Yong-dae	70	55	52	3	2	13	N/A	222	0.32	2010–2015	
2	(Tajikistan) (South Korea) Shin Eui-son	49	45	33	12	1	3	0	137	0.36	2000–2004	
3	(South Korea) Cha Sang-kwang	47+?	47	45	2	0	0	?	151+?	0.31+-?	1986–1991; 1995	
4	(South Korea) Kim Byung-ji	41	39	26	13	2	0	N/A	91	0.45	2006–2008	
5	(South Korea) **Yu Sang-hun**	34	25	25	N/A	5	4	N/A	105	0.32	2011–2016; 2018–present	
6	(South Korea) Kim Hyun-tae	30+?	30	24	6	0	0	?	116+?	0.26+-?	1984–1991; 1994; 1996–1997	
7	(South Korea) Kim Bong-soo	26	25	15	10	1	N/A	0	115	0.23	1992–1999	
8	(South Korea) Park Dong-suk	23	23	19	4	0	0	N/A	74	0.31	2002–2009	
9	(South Korea) Lim Jong-kuk	21	20	11	9	1	0	0	118	0.18	1991–2000	
10	(South Korea) **Yang Han-been**	20	18	18	N/A	1	1	0	71	0.28	2014–present	

=== Goals conceded per match ===
※ FC Seoul goalkeepers with at least 50 appearances.

Rank	Name	Total Goals conceded	K League	League	League Cup	FA Cup	Asia	Other	Total Apps	Goals conceded per Match	Seasons	Notes
1	(South Korea) Kim Byung-ji	73	66	46	20	7	N/A	N/A	91	0.802	2006–2008	
2	(South Korea) **Yu Sang-hun**	53	36	36	0	8	9	N/A	65	0.815	2011–2016; 2018–present	
3	(Tajikistan) (South Korea) Shin Eui-son	146	138	99	39	4	3	1	137	1.065	2000–2004	
4	(South Korea) Kim Yong-dae	239	196	190	6	13	30	N/A	222	1.076	2010–2015	
5	(South Korea) Cha Sang-kwang	164+?	161	152	9	N/A	N/A	3+?	151+?	1.086+?	1986–1991; 1995	
6	(South Korea) **Yang Han-been**	81	79	77	N/A	2	0	2	71	1.140	2014–present	
7	(South Korea) Park Dong-suk	89	81	59	22	8	0	N/A	74	1.202	2002–2009	
8	(South Korea) Kim Ho-jun	81	64	52	12	3	14	N/A	67	1.208	2005–2009	
9	(South Korea) Park Chul-woo	77	77	69	8	N/A	N/A	0	62	1.241	1992–1994	
10	(South Korea) Kim Hyun-tae	153+?	151	131	20	0	N/A	2+?	116+?	1.318+?	1984–1991; 1994; 1996–1997	
11	(South Korea) Lim Jong-kuk	165	155	119	36	5	N/A	5	118	1.398	1991–2000	
12	(South Korea) Kim Bong-soo	172	155	111	44	13	N/A	4	115	1.495	1992–1999	

=== Mosts in a single match ===
Category	Name	Record	Competition	Date	Opponent	H / A	Result	Note
Goals	(Brazil) Ricardo	5	AFC Champions League	2001-11-21	(Bangladesh) Muktijoddha Sangsad	H	8–0	
Goals	(South Korea) **Yun Ju-tae**	4	K League 1	2015-11-07	(South Korea) Suwon Samsung Bluewings	H	4–3	
Goals	(South Korea) Jung Jo-gook	4	FA Cup	2015-11-07	(South Korea) Paju Bumwoo	N	10–1	
Goals	(South Korea) Wang Jung-hyun	4	FA Cup	2015-11-07	(South Korea) Paju Bumwoo	N	10–1	
Assists	(South Korea) Lee Young-jin	3	K League 1	1991-09-11	(South Korea) Ilhwa Chunma	A	1–3	
Assists	(Russia) Oleg Elyshev	3	League Cup	1997-08-13	(South Korea) Jeonbuk Hyundai Dinos	H	4–1	
Assists	(Brazil) Mário	3	| K League 1	2003-09-03	(South Korea) Bucheon SK	A	1–4	
Assists	(South Korea) Lee Chung-yong	3	| K League 1	2009-03-07	(South Korea) Jeonnam Dragons	A	2–6	
Assists	(Montenegro) Dejan Damjanović	3	| K League 1	2010-04-04	(South Korea) Suwon Samsung Bluewings	H	3–1	
Assists	(Colombia) Mauricio Molina	3	| K League 1	2011-08-27	(South Korea) Gangwon FC	H	6–3	
Attack Points	(Colombia) Mauricio Molina	6	K League 1	2011-08-27	(South Korea) Gangwon FC	H	6–3	3 Goals and 3 Assists; K League New Record

=== Mosts in a single season ===
Category	Name	Season	Total	K League 1	FA Cup	ACL	Notes
**Appearances**	(Colombia) Mauricio Molina	2013	**49**	35	1	13	
**Goals**	(Montenegro) Dejan Damjanović	2012	**31**	31	0	0	
**Assists**	(Colombia) Mauricio Molina	2012	**19**	19	0	0	
**Attack Points**	(Colombia) Mauricio Molina	2012	**38**	37	1	0	
**Clean Sheets**	(South Korea) Kim Yong-dae	2012	**17**	17	0	0	

=== Most goals in a single season by competitions ===
Category	Name	Goals	Apps	Goals per Match	Season	Notes
K League 1	(Montenegro) Dejan Damjanović	31	42	0.74	2012	
FA Cup	(South Korea) Choi Yong-soo	5	3	1.67	1999	
FA Cup	(South Korea) Jung Jo-gook	5	2	2.5	2004	
FA Cup	(South Korea) Wang Jung-hyun	5	2	2.5	2004	
League Cup	(South Korea) Seo Jung-won	8	9	0.89	1997	
AFC Champions League	(Montenegro) Dejan Damjanović	7	13	0.54	2013	

=== Most clean sheets in a single season by competitions ===
Category	Name	Clean Sheets	Apps	Clean Sheets per Match	Season	Notes
K League 1	(South Korea) Kim Yong-dae	**17**	44	0.39	2012	
FA Cup	(South Korea) Kim Yong-dae	**2**	3	0.67	2011	
League Cup	(South Korea) Kim Byung-ji	**6**	13	0.46	2006	
League Cup	(South Korea) Kim Byung-ji	**6**	12	0.50	2007	
AFC Champions League	(South Korea) Kim Yong-dae	**5**	12	0.42	2013	

=== Most consecutive records ===
Category	Name	Record	Period	Notes
**Appearances**	(South Korea) Kim Byung-ji	**78 Apps**	2006/03/12–2007/10/14	Only K League matches 2006 K League season: **40 Apps** (League **27 Apps**, League Cup **13 Apps**); 2007 K League season: 38 Apps (League 26 Apps, League Cup 12 Apps)
**Goals**	(South Korea) Cho Young-jeung	**6 Matches** **(6 Goals)**	1984/07/22–1984/08/12	Only K League matches
**Goals**	(South Korea) Yoon Sang-chul	**6 Matches** **(9 Goals)**	1994/10/22–1994/11/16	Only K League matches
**3 Goals More**	(Brazil) Adriano	**2 Matches** **(7 Goals)**	2016/02/23–2016/03/01	AFC Champions League
**Assists**	(Japan) Sergio Escudero	**5 Matches** **(6 Assists)**	2013//11/02–2013/11/24	AFC Champions League matches included
**Attack Points**	(Colombia) Mauricio Molina	**6 Matches** **(4 Goals, 5 Assists)**	2012/04/29–2012/05/28	FA Cup matches included
**Clean Sheets**	(South Korea) Kim Yong-dae	**5 Matches**	2013/09/01–2013/09/25	AFC Champions League matches included
**Most Minutes**; **Without Conceding A Goal**	(South Korea) Kim Yong-dae	**500 Minutes**	2013/09/01–2013/10/03	AFC Champions League matches included

== Managers ==
=== Managerial history ===
※ For details on all-time manager statistics, see List of FC Seoul coaching staffs.

No.	Name	Appointed	From	To	Season	Notes
1	(South Korea) Park Se-hak	1983-08-12	1983-12-22	1987-11-19	1984–1987	First manager of FC Seoul.
C	(South Korea) Ko Jae-wook	1987-12-01	1987-12-01	1988-12-26	1988	Caretaker manager in 1988, before being promoted to regular manager in 1989.
2	(South Korea) Ko Jae-wook	1988-12-27	1988-12-27	1993-12-31	1989–1993	
3	(South Korea) Cho Young-jeung	1993-11-23	1994-01-01	1996-11-05	1994–1996	First manager who was a former FC Seoul player.; First manager who resigned in the middle of season.
C	(South Korea) Park Hang-seo	1996-11-05	1996-11-05	1996-12-01	1996	Caretaker manager in FA Cup, one match in charge.
4	(South Korea) Park Byung-joo	1996-12-10	1996-12-20	1998-11-25	1997–1998	Won the first FA Cup for FC Seoul.
5	(South Korea) Cho Kwang-rae	1998-10-22	1998-12-01	2004-12-15	1999–2004	The club's longest serving manager (6 seasons)
6	(South Korea) Lee Jang-soo	2004-12-30	2005-01-10	2006-12-02	2005–2006	Won the first League Cup for FC Seoul.
7	(Turkey) Şenol Güneş	2006-12-08	2007-01-08	2009-11-25	2007–2009	First foreign manager of FC Seoul.
8	(Portugal) Nelo Vingada	2009-12-14	2010-01-03	2010-12-13	2010	First (and only) manager to win the double.
9	(South Korea) Hwangbo Kwan	2010-12-28	2011-01-05	2011-04-26	2011	First manager who resigned in the middle of League.
C	(South Korea) Choi Yong-soo	2011-04-26	2011-04-26	2011-12-08	2011	Caretaker manager in 2011, before being promoted to regular manager in 2012.
10	(South Korea) Choi Yong-soo	2011-12-09	2011-12-09	2016-06-22	2012–2016	First manager who won K League as a FC Seoul player and a manager.
C	(South Korea) Kim Seong-jae	2016-06-23	2016-06-23	2016-06-26	2016	Caretaker manager in 2016, Left after one match in charge.
11	(South Korea) Hwang Sun-hong	2016-06-21	2016-06-27	2018-04-30	2016–2018	
C	(South Korea) Lee Eul-yong	2018-04-30	2018-04-30	2018-10-11	2018	
12	(South Korea) Choi Yong-soo	2018-10-11	2018-10-11	2020-07-30	2018–2020	First manager who was appointed twice.
C	(South Korea) Kim Ho-young	2020-08-04	2020-08-04	2020-09-24	2020	
C	(South Korea) Park Hyuk-soon	2020-09-25	2020-09-25	2020-11-12	2020	
C	(South Korea) Lee Won-jun	2020-11-13	2020-11-13	2020-12-03	2020	
13	(South Korea) Park Jin-sub	2020-12-08	2020-12-08		2021–	

=== Match results ===
As of 25 June 2016

※ Win%, Draw%, Lose%, GFA, GAA: Only K League regular season (included K League Championship) and League Cup matches are counted.
※ Penalty shoot-outs results in 1993, 1998, 1999, 2000 seasons are not counted by K League's principle of official statistics.

No.	Name	Season	Pld	W	D	L	GF	GA	GD	Win%	Draw%	Lose%	GFA	GAA	Notes
1	(South Korea) Park Se-hak	1984–1987	117	39	32	46	141	158	-17	33%	27%	39%	1.21	1.35	
C	(South Korea) Ko Jae-wook	1988	209	67	82	60	237	228	+9	32%	39%	29%	1.13	1.09	
2	(South Korea) Ko Jae-wook	1989–1993	209	67	82	60	237	228	+9	32%	39%	29%	1.13	1.09	
3	(South Korea) Cho Young-jeung	1994–1996	111	31	33	47	147	173	-26	28%	30%	42%	1.32	1.56	
4	(South Korea) Park Byung-joo	1997–1998	71	20	22	29	91	103	-12	28%	31%	41%	1.28	1.45	
5	(South Korea) Cho Kwang-rae	1999–2004	229	88	65	76	306	282	+24	38%	28%	33%	1.34	1.23	
6	(South Korea) Lee Jang-soo	2005–2006	76	30	25	21	106	84	+22	39%	33%	28%	1.39	1.11	
7	(Turkey) Şenol Güneş	2007–2009	110	51	37	22	154	100	+54	46%	34%	20%	1.40	0.91	
8	(Portugal) Nelo Vingada	2010	37	25	6	6	79	35	+44	68%	16%	16%	2.14	0.95	
9	(South Korea) Hwangbo Kwan	2011	7	1	3	3	6	10	-4	14%	43%	43%	0.86	1.43	
C	(South Korea) Choi Yong-soo	2011	198	102	51	45	312	211	+101	52%	26%	23%	1.58	1.07	
10	(South Korea) Choi Yong-soo	2012–2016	198	102	51	45	312	211	+101	52%	26%	23%	1.58	1.07	
C	(South Korea) Kim Seong-jae	2016	1	0	0	1	1	2	-1	0%	0%	100%	1	2	
11	(South Korea) Hwang Sun-hong	2016–2018													
C	(South Korea) Lee Eul-yong	2018													
12	(South Korea) Choi Yong-soo	2018–present													

== Debut match ==
=== Player debut match ===
Category	Name	Record	Date / Period	Competition	Opponent	Notes
Most Goals	(Portugal) Ricardo Esteves	2 Goals	2010-02-27	K League 1	(South Korea) Daejeon Citizen	
Most Assists						
Consecutive Goals	(Thailand) Piyapong Pue-on	4 Matches (4 Goals)	1984/09/08–1984/10/27	K League 1	(South Korea) POSCO Dolphins (South Korea) Hanil Bank (South Korea) Kookmin Bank (South Korea) Yukong Elephants	His scoring goal is also new record in K League foreign player history
Consecutive Assists						

=== Manager debut match ===
Category	Name	Record	Date / Period	Competition	Opponent	Notes
Biggest Win	(Portugal) Nelo Vingada	5–2	2010-02-27	K League 1	(South Korea) Daejeon Citizen	
Heaviest Defeat	(South Korea) Cho Kwang-rae	1–5	1994-03-27	Super Cup	(South Korea) Suwon Samsung Bluewings	
Most Consecutive Wins	(Turkey) Şenol Güneş	5 Matches	2007/03/04-2007/03/21	K League 1 & League Cup		
Most Consecutive Defeats						

== Members ==
=== Founding members ===
Management	Chairman	(South Korea) Koo Cha-kyung
Management	President	(South Korea) Lee Hun-jo
Management	Director	(South Korea) Ko Kyung-hwan
Coaching Staff	Manager	(South Korea) Park Se-hak
Coaching Staff	Assistant manager	(South Korea) Park Yong-hwan
Coaching Staff	Coach	(South Korea) Ko Jae-wook
Players	GK	(South Korea) Kim Hyun-tae, (South Korea) Seo Seok-bum
Players	DF	(South Korea) Han Moon-bae, (South Korea) Cho Young-jeung, (South Korea) Jung Hae-seong, (South Korea) Jung Tae-young, (South Korea) Kwon Oh-son, (South Korea) Shin Jae-heum, (South Korea) Min Jin-hong
Players	MF	(South Korea) Kang Deuk-soo, (South Korea) Park Hang-seo, (South Korea) Lee Yong-soo, (South Korea) Kim Kwang-hoon, (South Korea) Kim Yong-hae
Players	FW	(South Korea) Lee Jong-kwang, (South Korea) So Kwang-ho, (South Korea) Lee Yong-seol, (South Korea) Moon Myung-soo, (South Korea) Hong Jong-won, (South Korea) Kim Tae-young

※ After Inauguration ceremony (1983-12-22), These players are joined.

Players	MF	(South Korea) Lee Sang-rae, (South Korea) Park Byung-chul
Players	FW	(South Korea) Park Chung-il, (Thailand) Piyapong Pue-on

=== Captains ===
Seasons	Captain	Vice-captain	Notes
1984	(South Korea) Han Moon-bae		
1985	(South Korea) Kim Kwang-hoon		
1986	(South Korea) Park Hang-seo		–September 1986
1986–1988	(South Korea) Jung Hae-seong		September 1986–
1989–1990	(South Korea) Choi Jin-han		
1991–1992	(South Korea) Lee Young-jin		
1993	(South Korea) Gu Sang-bum		
1994	(South Korea) Choi Young-jun		
1995	(South Korea) Yoon Sang-chul		−4 August 1995
1995–1996	(South Korea) Lee Young-ik		5 August 1995–
1997	(South Korea) Cho Byung-young		
1998	(South Korea) Kim Bong-soo		
1999	(South Korea) Kang Chun-ho		−July 1999
1999–2000	(South Korea) Choi Yong-soo		July 1999–9 May 2000
2000	(South Korea) Kim Gwi-hwa	(South Korea) Lee Young-pyo	10 May 2000–
2001	(South Korea) Lee Sang-hun		−May 2001
2001	(South Korea) Son Hyun-jun		May 2001–
2002	(South Korea) Choi Yoon-yeol		
2003–2004	(South Korea) Kim Seong-jae		
2005–2006	(South Korea) Lee Min-sung		
2007–2008	(South Korea) Lee Eul-yong	(South Korea) Kim Chi-gon	
2009	(South Korea) Kim Chi-gon	(South Korea) Kim Jin-kyu	
2010	(South Korea) Park Yong-ho	(South Korea) Kim Jin-kyu	
2011	(South Korea) Park Yong-ho	(South Korea) Hyun Young-min	
2012–2013	(South Korea) Ha Dae-sung	(South Korea) Kim Jin-kyu	
2014	(South Korea) Kim Jin-kyu	(South Korea) Koh Myong-jin	
2015	(South Korea) Koh Myong-jin	(Spain) Osmar	−30 April 2015
2015	(South Korea) Cha Du-ri	(Spain) Osmar	1 May 2015–
2016	(Spain) Osmar	(South Korea) Yoo Hyun	First foreign captain of FC Seoul
2017	(South Korea) Kwak Tae-hwi	(South Korea) Park Chu-young	
2018	(South Korea) Shin Kwang-hoon	(South Korea) Go Yo-han	−3 July 2018
2018	(South Korea) Go Yo-han	(South Korea) Lee Woong-hee	4 July 2018–

=== Players in major competitions ===
- For details on all-time players, see List of FC Seoul players in major competitions.

※ Seo Jung-Won and Choi Yong-Soo were on military service during World Cup.
※ As of 2010 World Cup South Korea, 20 players from FC Seoul participate in World Cup.

Competition	Players	Sum	Notes
1986 FIFA World Cup	(South Korea) Cho Young-jeung (DF), (South Korea) Cho Min-kook (DF), (South Korea) Kang Deuk-soo (FW)	3	
1990 FIFA World Cup	(South Korea) Cho Min-kook (DF), (South Korea) Gu Sang-bum (DF), (South Korea) Lee Young-jin (MF) (South Korea) Choi Soon-ho (FW)	4	
1994 FIFA World Cup	(South Korea) Park Chul-woo (GK), (South Korea) Kim Pan-keun (DF), (South Korea) Lee Young-jin (MF) (South Korea) Choi Dae-shik (MF), (South Korea) Seo Jung-won (FW)	5	
1998 FIFA World Cup	(South Korea) Lee Sang-hun (DF), (South Korea) Choi Yong-soo (FW)	2	
2002 FIFA World Cup	(South Korea) Lee Young-pyo (MF), (South Korea) Choi Tae-uk (FW)	2	
2006 FIFA World Cup	(South Korea) Kim Dong-jin (DF), (South Korea) Baek Ji-hoon (MF), (South Korea) Park Chu-young (FW)	3	
2010 FIFA World Cup	(South Korea) Lee Seung-yeoul (FW)	1	
2014 FIFA World Cup	None	0	
2018 FIFA World Cup	(South Korea) Go Yo-han (MF)	1	
Total		21	

=== Chairmans ===
No.	Name	From	To	Season	Notes
1	(South Korea) Koo Cha-kyung	1983-08-12	1990-12-27	1984–1990	The First Chairman
2	(South Korea) Koo Bon-moo	1990-12-28	1998-02-28	1991–1997	
3	(South Korea) Huh Chang-soo	1998-03-01	2020-03-26	1998–2019	
4	(South Korea) Huh Tae-soo	2020-03-26	present	2020–present	

== Attendance ==
=== Total attendance and average attendance ===
※ Season total attendance is K League 1 Regular season, K League Postseason (2004–2011: Championship, 2013–present: Promotion-relegation PO), League Cup, FA Cup, AFC Champions League
in the aggregate and friendly match attendance is not included.
※ K League season total attendance is K League 1 Regular season, K League Postseason (2004–2011: Championship, 2013–present: Promotion-relegation PO), League Cup in the aggregate.

Season	Season Total Att.	K League Total Att.	Regular season Average Att.	Postseason Average Att.	League Cup Average Att.	FA Cup Total / Average Att.	ACL Total / Average Att.	Friendly Match Att.	Att. Ranking	Notes
1984–2003	Official Attendance Records Don't Have Credibility									
2004	223,529	223,529	15,363	Did not qualify	6,529	No home match	Did not qualify	Not held		
2005	458,605	458,605	22,010	Did not qualify	32,415	No home match	Did not qualify	17,211 (vs Boca Juniors)	K League Season; Total Att. 1st	
2006	357,231	315,698	18,782	No home match	11,921	41,533 / 13,844	Did not qualify	61,235 (vs F.C. Tokyo)	K League Season; Total Att. 2nd	FA Cup highest attendance new record in 2006 FA Cup Quarter-finals; Friendly match with FC Tokyo was for free
2007	411,362	379,903	21,515	Did not qualify	14,315	31,459 / 31,459	Did not qualify	65,000 (vs Manchester United)	K League Season; Total Att. 2nd	
2008	398,757	398,757	20,868	32,485	12,499	No home match	Did not qualify	34,000 (vs Los Angeles Galaxy); 41,500 (vs FC Tokyo)	K League Season; Total Att. 2nd	Postseason: K League Championship; 2 matches Average Att.
2009	319,250	270,624	16,779	13,116	11,300	1,315 / 1,315	47,311 / 11,828	65,000 (vs Manchester United)	K League Season; Total Att. 2nd	Postseason: K League Championship; 1 match Average Att.
2010	547,592	546,397	30,849	56,759	14,439	1,195 / 1,195	Did not qualify	Not held	K League Season; Total Att. 1st	Postseason: K League Championship; 1 match Average Att.
2011	520,138	448,027	27,815	30,799	Did not qualify	3,733 / 3,733	68,378 / 13,676	Not held	K League Season; Total Att. 1st	Postseason: K League Championship; 1 match Average Att.
2012	467,649	451,045	20,502	Championship ceased	Competition ceased	16,604 / 8,302	Did not qualify	Not held	K League Season; Total Att. 1st	
2013	451,845	315,540	16,607	N/A	Competition ceased	11,945 / 3,982	124,360 / 17,766	Not held	K League Season; Total Att. 2nd	
2014	424,405	323,244	17,013	N/A	Competition ceased	36,901 / 12,300	64,260 / 10,710	46,722 (vs Bayer Leverkusen)	K League Season; Total Att. 2nd	
2015	406,820	326,269	17,172	N/A	Competition ceased	34,634 / 11,545	45,917 / 9,183	Not held	K League Season; Total Att. 2nd	
2016	474,044	342,134	18,007	N/A	Competition ceased	53,645 / 10,729	78,265 / 13,044	Not held	K League Season; Total Att. 1st	
2017	345,260	310,061	16,319	N/A	Competition ceased	6,733 / 3,367	28,466 / 9,489	No home match	K League Season; Total Att. 1st	
2018	232,108	228,299	11,566	8,554	Competition ceased	3,809 / 3,809	Did not qualify	Not held	K League Season; Total Att. 2nd	Postseason: K League Promotion-relegation PO; 1 match Average Att.

=== Attendance new records by FC Seoul ===
Records	Date / Season	Matches	Attendance	Notes
Korean Pro Sports Single-Match Highest Attendance New Record	2010-05-05	1	60,747	
K League Championship Single-Match Highest Attendance New Record	2010-12-05	1	56,759	
K League Single-Regular Season Highest Average Attendance New Record	2010 Season	14	30,849	League: 14 matches
K League Single-Regular & Post Season Highest Average Attendance New Record	2010 Season	15	32,576	League: 14 matches Championship Final: 1 match
K League Single-Regular & Post Season Highest Total Attendance New Record	2010 Season	15	488,641	League: 14 matches Championship Final: 1 match
K League Single-Season Highest Total Attendance New Record	2010 Season	19	546,397	League: 14 matches Championship Final: 1 match League Cup: 4 matches

=== Korean professional sports single-match highest attendance records top 10 ===
Rank	Competition	Date	Home team	Result	Away team	Venue	Attendance	Notes
1	2010 K League	2010-05-05	FC Seoul	4–0	(South Korea) Seongnam Ilhwa Chunma	Seoul World Cup Stadium	60,747	Children's Day
2	2010 K League	2010-12-05	FC Seoul	2–1	(South Korea) Jeju United	Seoul World Cup Stadium	56,759	Weekend; K League Championship Final; 2nd Leg
3	2013 AFC Champions League	2013-10-26	FC Seoul	2–2	(China) Guangzhou Evergrande	Seoul World Cup Stadium	55,501	Weekend; AFC Champions League Final; 1st Leg
4	2007 K League	2007-04-08	FC Seoul	0–1	(South Korea) Suwon Samsung Bluewings	Seoul World Cup Stadium	55,397	Weekend
5	2011 K League	2011-03-06	FC Seoul	0–2	(South Korea) Suwon Samsung Bluewings	Seoul World Cup Stadium	51,606	Weekend; 2011 Season Home Opener
6	2012 K League	2012-08-19	FC Seoul	0–2	(South Korea) Suwon Samsung Bluewings	Seoul World Cup Stadium	50,787	Weekend
7	2010 K League	2010-04-04	FC Seoul	3–1	(South Korea) Suwon Samsung Bluewings	Seoul World Cup Stadium	48,558	Weekend
8	2005 K League	2005-07-10	FC Seoul	4–1	(South Korea) Pohang Steelers	Seoul World Cup Stadium	48,375	Weekend
9	2004 K League	2004-04-03	FC Seoul	1–1	(South Korea) Suwon Samsung Bluewings	Seoul World Cup Stadium	47,928	Weekend
10	2016 K League Classic	2016-06-18	FC Seoul	1–1	(South Korea) Suwon Samsung Bluewings	Seoul World Cup Stadium	47,899	Weekend

== Transfers fee ==
- For details transfers fee, see List of FC Seoul transfers.

=== Highest transfer fees received top 10 ===
※ Rangk is based on South Korean won converted at the exchange rate, at that time.

Rank	Date	Name	POS	Moving to	Period	Fee	Notes
1	2016-01-15	(Brazil) Carlos Adriano de Sousa Cruz	FW	(China) Shijiazhuang Ever Bright	3 years	$4,000,000	
2	2009-08-14	(South Korea) Lee Chung-yong	MF	(England) Bolton Wanderers	3 years	£2,200,000	
3	2013-12-26	(Montenegro) Dejan Damjanović	FW	(China) Jiangsu Sainty	3 years	$4,000,000	
4	2009-12-21	(South Korea) Ki Sung-yueng	MF	(Scotland) Celtic	4 years	£2,000,000	
5	2011-07-09	(Uzbekistan) Server Djeparov	MF	(Saudi Arabia) Al-Shabab	3 years	€2,250,000	
6	2008-09-01	(South Korea) Park Chu-young	FW	(France) AS Monaco	4 years	€2,000,000	
7	2014-12-23	(South Korea) Kim Ju-young	DF	(China) Shanghai SIPG	3 years	$2,500,000	
8	2003-01-08	(South Korea) Lee Young-pyo	DF	(Netherlands) PSV Eindhoven	3 years & 6 months (first 6 months loan)	$1,800,000	
9	2012-02-01	(South Korea) Lee Seung-yeoul	FW	(Japan) Gamba Osaka	2 years	$1,950,000	
10	2006-06-27	(South Korea) Kim Dong-jin	DF	(Russia) Zenit	3 years	$2,000,000	

=== Highest transfer fees paid top 10 ===
※ Rangking is based on South Korean won converted at the exchange rate, at that time.

Rank	Date	Name	POS	Moving from	Period	Fee	Notes
1	2007-12-07	(Montenegro) Dejan Damjanović	FW	(South Korea) Incheon United	4 years	$2,710,000	$2,160,000 + 2 players (Lee Jung-Youl, Kim Tae-Jin)
2	2011-01-24	(Colombia) Mauricio Molina	MF	(South Korea) Seongnam Ilhwa Chunma	3 years	$1,350,000~1,800,000	
3	2000-02-25	(Serbia) Dragan Stojisavljević	FW	(Serbia) FK Partizan	2 years	$1,200,000	
4	2011-02-07	(Uzbekistan) Server Djeparov	MF	(Uzbekistan) FC Bunyodkor	3 years	$1,000,000~1,350,000	
5	2012-12-22	(South Korea) Kim Eun-jung	FW	(South Korea) Daejeon Citizen	5 years	$1000,000	
6	2008-07-31	(South Korea) Kim Chi-woo	MF	(South Korea) Jeonnam Dragons	3 years & 6 months	$1000,000	
7	2010-01-03	(South Korea) Kim Yong-dae	GK	(South Korea) Seongnam Ilhwa Chunma	3 years	$860,000	
8	2010-07-27	(South Korea) Choi Tae-uk	MF	(South Korea) Jeonbuk Hyundai Motors	3 years & 6 months	$833,000	
9	2012-12-22	(South Korea) Yun Il-lok	MF	(South Korea) Gyeongnam FC	Unknown	$930,665	
10	2014-01-19	(Brazil) Rafael Costa	FW	(Brazil) Figueirense	4 years	R$2,000,000	

== Others ==
=== Sister clubs ===
Club	Date	Note
(Japan) Hitachi FC (Currently Kashiwa Reysol)	1992-04-14	
(Argentina) Boca Juniors	2005-07-25	
(Japan) F.C. Tokyo	2006-08-05	

== See also ==
- FC Seoul award winners
- FC Seoul in Asia
