= 1984–1990 Lucky-Goldstar FC seasons =

South Korean football club seasons

Lucky-Goldstar FC was a South Korean professional football club based in Seoul.

== Seasons statistics ==
=== All competitions records ===
Season	Teams	K League	Pld	W	D	L	GF	GA	GD	Pts	League Cup	FA Cup	Super Cup	Asian Club Championship	Manager
1984	8	7th	28	8	6	14	38	45	–7	33					(South Korea) Park Se-hak
1984	8	Champions	21	10	7	4	35	19	+16	27					(South Korea) Park Se-hak
1986	6	Runners-up	20	10	7	3	28	17	+11	27	5th (Pro)^{[1]}			Did not qualify	(South Korea) Park Se-hak
1987	5	5th	32	7	7	18	26	55	–29	21	No competition			Qualified but withdrew	(South Korea) Park Se-hak
1988	5	4th	24	6	11	7	22	29	–7	23	No competition	Winners (Nat'l)^{[2]}		Did not qualify	(South Korea) Ko Jae-wook (C)
1989	6	Runners-up	40	15	17	8	53	40	+13	47	No competition	Semi-finals (Nat'l)^{[2]}		Did not qualify	(South Korea) Ko Jae-wook
1990	6	Champions	30	14	11	5	40	25	+15	39	No competition			Did not qualify	(South Korea) Ko Jae-wook

^{[1]} In 1986, Tournament name was Korea Professional Football Championship
^{[2]} In 1988 and 1989, Tournament name was National Football Championship

=== K League Championship records ===
Season	Teams	Position	Pld	W	D	L	GF	GA	GD	PSO	Manager
1986	2	Runners-up	2	0	1	1	1	2	-1	N/A	(South Korea) Park Se-Hak

== Kits ==
=== First Kit ===
1984	1985	1986	1987^{(1)}	1988	1989–1990

=== Second Kit ===
1984	1985	1986	1987^{(1)}	1988	1989	1990

=== Third Kit ===
1984	1985

※ Notes
(1) In only 1987 season, All K League clubs wore white jerseys in home match, coloured jersey in away match like Major League Baseball.

== Transfers ==
==== Founding members ====
#	Name	POS	Moving from	Mode	Window	Period	Fee	Notes
1	(South Korea) Kim Hyun-Tae	GK	(South Korea) Korea University	Transfer	Winter (1983-12-22)			
2	(South Korea) Seo Seok-Bum	GK	(South Korea) Konkuk University	Transfer	Winter (1983-12-22)			
3	(South Korea) Han Moon-Bae	DF	(South Korea) Seoul Trust Bank FC	Transfer	Winter (1983-12-22)			
4	(South Korea) Cho Young-Jeung	DF	(United States) Chicago Sting	Transfer	Winter (1983-12-22)	3 years	$25,000	
5	(South Korea) Jung Hae-Seong	DF	(South Korea) Korea University	Transfer	Winter (1983-12-22)			
6	(South Korea) Jeong Tae-Yeong	DF	(South Korea) Unknown	Transfer	Winter (1983-12-22)			
7	(South Korea) Kwon Oh-Son	DF	(South Korea) Kookmin Bank FC	Transfer	Winter (1983-12-22)			
8	(South Korea) Shin Jae-Heum	DF	(South Korea) Daewoo Royals	Transfer	Winter (1983-12-22)			
9	(South Korea) Min Jin-Hong	DF	(South Korea) Daewoo Royals	Transfer	Winter (1983-12-22)			
10	(South Korea) Kang Deuk-Soo	MF	(South Korea) Yonsei University	Transfer	Winter (1983-12-22)			
11	(South Korea) Park Hang-Seo	MF	(South Korea) Army FC	Transfer	Winter (1983-12-22)			
12	(South Korea) Lee Yong-Soo	MF	(South Korea) Commercial Bank FC	Transfer	Winter (1983-12-22)			
13	(South Korea) Kim Kwang-Hun	MF	(South Korea) Yukong Elephants	Transfer	Winter (1983-12-22)			
14	(South Korea) Kim Yong-Hae	MF	(South Korea) Yukong Elephants	Transfer	Winter (1983-12-22)			
15	(South Korea) Lee Jong-Kwang	FW	(South Korea) Kwangwoon University	Transfer	Winter (1983-12-22)			
16	(South Korea) So Kwang-Ho	FW	(South Korea) Hanyang University	Transfer	Winter (1983-12-22)			
17	(South Korea) Lee Yong-Seol	FW	(South Korea) Daewoo Royals	Transfer	Winter (1983-12-22)			
18	(South Korea) Moon Myung-Soo	FW	(South Korea) Korea University	Transfer	Winter (1983-12-22)			
19	(South Korea) Hong Jong-Won	FW	(South Korea) Korea National Railroad FC	Transfer	Winter (1983-12-22)			
20	(South Korea) Kim Tae-Young	FW	(South Korea) Chohung Bank FC	Transfer	Winter (1983-12-22)			

===== In =====
#	Name	POS	Moving from	Mode	Window	Period	Fee	Notes
1	(South Korea) Lee Sang-Rae	MF	(South Korea) Navy FC	Transfer	Winter (1984-01-??)			
2	(South Korea) Park Chung-Il	FW	(South Korea) Daewoo Royals	Transfer	Winter (1984-02-??)			
3	(Thailand) Piyapong Pue-on	FW	(Thailand) Royal Thai Air Force	Transfer	Summer (1984-06-01)	2 years	Undisclosed	
4	(South Korea) Park Byung-chul	MF	(Hong Kong) Bulova SA	Transfer	Summer (1984-06-08)	Unknown	$18,000	

=== 1984 season ===
==== In ====
#	Name	POS	Moving from	Mode	Window	Period	Fee	Notes
1	(South Korea) Wang Sun-Jae	MF	(South Korea) Hanil Bank FC		Winter (1984-11-21)			
2	(South Korea) Lee Boo-Yeol	MF	(South Korea) Kookmin Bank FC		Winter (1984-11-21)			

===== Rookie Free Agent =====
#	Name	POS	Moving from	Mode	Window	Period	Fee	Notes
1	(South Korea) Choi Jin-Han	MF	(South Korea) Myongji University		Winter (1984-12-13)			

==== Out ====
#	Name	POS	Moving from	Mode	Window	Period	Fee	Notes
1	(South Korea) Min Jin-Hong	DF	(South Korea) Yukong Elephants	Transfer	Winter (1984-12-10)	Unknown		

===== Loan & Military service =====
#	Name	POS	Moving to	Window	Period	Fee	Notes
1	(South Korea)		(South Korea)	Winter		N/A	

=== 1986 season ===
==== In ====
#	Name	POS	Moving from	Mode	Window	Period	Fee	Notes
1	(South Korea) Park Kook-Chang	MF	(South Korea) Yukong Elephants		Summer			

===== Rookie Free Agent =====
#	Name	POS	Moving from	Mode	Window	Period	Fee	Notes
1	(South Korea) Lee Young-jin	MF	(South Korea) University of Incheon		Winter			
2	(South Korea) Cho Min-Kook	DF	(South Korea) Korea University		Winter			
3	(South Korea) Gu Sang-Bum	DF	(South Korea) University of Incheon		Winter			
4	(South Korea) Cha Sang-Kwang	GK	(South Korea) Hanyang University		Winter			

==== Out ====
#	Name	POS	Moving from	Mode	Window	Period	Fee	Notes
1	(Thailand) Piyapong Pue-on	FW	(Malaysia) Pahang FA	Transfer	Summer	Unknown		

===== Loan & Military service =====
#	Name	POS	Moving to	Window	Period	Fee	Notes
1	(South Korea)		(South Korea)	Winter		N/A	

=== 1987 season ===
==== In ====
#	Name	POS	Moving from	Mode	Window	Period	Fee	Notes
1	(South Korea) Kang Shin Woo	FW	(South Korea) Daewoo Royals		Winter (1986-12-10)		$29,000	
2	(South Korea) Kim Ki-Yun	FW	(South Korea) Daewoo Royals		Winter (1986-12-10)		$29,000	
3	(South Korea) Park Yoon-Ki	FW	(South Korea) Yukong Elephants		Winter (1986-12-10)		Trade	

===== Rookie Free Agent =====
#	Name	POS	Moving from	Mode	Window	Period	Fee	Notes
1	(South Korea) Chang Jeong	DF	(South Korea) Ajou University		Winter (1986-12-10)			
2	(South Korea) Kim Hong-Kyu	DF	(South Korea) Dongguk University		Winter (1986-12-10)			

==== Out ====
#	Name	POS	Moving from	Mode	Window	Period	Fee	Notes
1	(South Korea) Han Moon-Bae	DF		Contract ended	Winter			Retired
2	(South Korea) Kim Min-Ho	DF	(South Korea) Yukong Elephants	Transfer	Winter (1986-12-10)	Unknown	Trade	

===== Loan & Military service =====
#	Name	POS	Moving to	Window	Period	Fee	Notes
1	(South Korea)		(South Korea)	Winter		N/A	

=== 1988 season ===
==== In ====
#	Name	POS	Moving from	Mode	Window	Period	Fee	Notes
1	(South Korea) Choi Soon-Ho	FW	(South Korea) POSCO Atoms		Winter			

===== Rookie Draft =====
#	Name	POS	Moving from	Mode	Notes
1	(South Korea) Choi Young-jun	DF	(South Korea) Yonsei University		
2	(South Korea) Cho Byung-Young	DF	(South Korea) Andong National University		
3	(South Korea) Kim Nam-Ho	MF	(South Korea) Yonsei University		
4	(South Korea) Yoon Sang-Chul	FW	(South Korea) Konkuk University		
5	(South Korea) Joo Kyeong-Chul	FW	(South Korea) Yeungnam University		

==== Out ====
#	Name	POS	Moving from	Mode	Window	Period	Fee	Notes
1	(South Korea) Cho Young-Jeoung	DF		Contract ended				Retired

===== Loan & Military service =====
#	Name	POS	Moving to	Window	Period	Fee	Notes
1	(South Korea)		(South Korea)	Winter		N/A	

=== 1989 season ===
==== In ====
#	Name	POS	Moving from	Mode	Window	Period	Fee	Notes
1	(South Korea) Choi Tae-Jin	DF	(South Korea) Daewoo Royals		Winter			

===== Rookie Draft =====
#	Name	POS	Moving from	Mode	Notes
1	(South Korea) Lee In-Jae	FW	(South Korea) Chung-Ang University	Franchise	
2	(South Korea) Lee Young-Ik	DF	(South Korea) Korea University	Regular (1st)	
3	(South Korea) Kim Dong-Hae	MF	(South Korea) Hanyang University	Regular (2nd)	
4	(South Korea) Kim Seok-Hwan	DF	(South Korea) Yeungnam University	Regular (3rd)	
5	(South Korea) Oh Jae-Il	FW	(South Korea) Sungkyunkwan University	Regular (4th)	
6	(South Korea) Cha Yeon-Ju	FW	(South Korea) Andong National University	Regular (5th)	

==== Out ====
#	Name	POS	Moving from	Mode	Window	Period	Fee	Notes
1	(South Korea) Lee Boo-Yeol	DF	Unknown	Contract ended	Winter	N/A		

===== Loan & Military service =====
#	Name	POS	Moving to	Window	Period	Fee	Notes
1	(South Korea)		(South Korea)	Winter			

=== 1990 season ===
==== In ====
#	Name	POS	Moving from	Mode	Window	Period	Fee	Notes
1	(South Korea) Choi Tae-Jin	DF	(South Korea) Daewoo Royals		Winter			

===== Rookie Draft =====
#	Name	POS	Moving from	Mode	Notes
1	(South Korea) Lee In-Jae	FW	(South Korea) Chung-Ang University	Franchise	
2	(South Korea) Lee Young-Ik	DF	(South Korea) Korea University	Regular (1st)	
3	(South Korea) Kim Dong-Hae	MF	(South Korea) Hanyang University	Regular (2nd)	
4	(South Korea) Kim Seok-Hwan	DF	(South Korea) Yeungnam University	Regular (3rd)	
5	(South Korea) Oh Jae-Il	FW	(South Korea) Sungkyunkwan University	Regular (4th)	
6	(South Korea) Cha Yeon-Ju	FW	(South Korea) Andong National University	Regular (5th)	

==== Out ====
#	Name	POS	Moving from	Mode	Window	Period	Fee	Notes
1	(South Korea) Lee Boo-Yeol	DF	Unknown	Contract ended	Winter	N/A		

===== Loan & Military service =====
#	Name	POS	Moving to	Window	Period	Fee	Notes
1	(South Korea)		(South Korea)	Winter			

== See also ==
- FC Seoul
