= FC Seoul in international competitions =

FC Seoul is a South Korean professional football club based in Seoul, South Korea, who currently play in the K League Classic. FC Seoul's first participation in Asian competition was during the 1986 season, when they competed in the Asian Club Championship, their first match was against Hap Kuan of Macau, but FC Seoul withdrew. FC Seoul's next participation in Asian competition was 1999–2000 Asian Cup Winners' Cup and actual first match was Shimizu S-Pulse of Japan.

FC Seoul haven't won the Asia Champions League not yet, only have runners-up one time. Their most recent participation in the competition was in 2011.

== Matches ==
=== AFC Competitions ===
==== 1980s ====
| # | Season | Competition | Date | Round | Opponent | H / A | Result | Scorer (s) |
|---|---|---|---|---|---|---|---|---|
| 1 | 1986 | Asian; Club Championship | – | First round | (Macau) Hap Kuan | | W/O | |

==== 2000s ====
| # | Season | Competition | Date | Round | Opponent | H / A | Result | Scorer (s) |
|---|---|---|---|---|---|---|---|---|
| 1 | 1999–2000 | Asian; Cup Winners' Cup | – | Second round 1st leg | (Singapore) Sembawang Rangers | | W/O | |
| 2 | 1999–2000 | Asian; Cup Winners' Cup | – | Second round 2nd leg | (Singapore) Sembawang Rangers | | W/O | |
| 3 | 1999–2000 | Asian; Cup Winners' Cup | 2000-02-26 | Quarter-finals; 1st leg | (Japan) Shimizu S-Pulse | A | 1–3 | S: Choi Yong-soo; SH: Sotaro Yasunaga, Masaaki Sawanobori, Toshihide Saito |
| 4 | 1999–2000 | Asian; Cup Winners' Cup | 2000-03-01 | Quarter-finals; 2nd leg | (Japan) Shimizu S-Pulse | H | 1–2 | S: Kim Gwi-hwa; SH: Ryuzo Morioka, Masaaki Sawanobori |

| # | Season | Competition | Date | Round | Opponent | H / A | Result | Scorer (s) |
|---|---|---|---|---|---|---|---|---|
| 2 | 2001–02 | Asian; Club Championship | 2001-11-21 | Second Round; 1st leg | (Bangladesh) Muktijoddha Sangsad | H | 8–0 | S: Ricardo (5), Park Jung-hwan, Dragan Stojisavljević, Choi Tae-uk |
| 3 | 2001–02 | Asian; Club Championship | 2001-11-28 | Second Round; 2nd leg | (Bangladesh) Muktijoddha Sangsad | A | 3–0 | S: Kim Byung-chae, Park Jung-hwan, (O.G) |
| 4 | 2001–02 | Asian; Club Championship | 2002-02-17 | Quarter-finals (East Asia) | (South Korea) Suwon Samsung Bluewings | N | 0–0 | |
| 5 | 2001–02 | Asian; Club Championship | 2002-02-19 | Quarter-finals (East Asia) | (China) Dalian Shide | N | 1–1 | S: Wang Jung-hyun; D: Yan Song |
| 6 | 2001–02 | Asian; Club Championship | 2002-02-21 | Quarter-finals (East Asia) | (Japan) Kashima Antlers | N | 1–1 | S: Andre; K: Masashi Motoyama |
| 7 | 2001–02 | Asian; Club Championship | 2002-04-03 | Semi-finals | (Iran) Esteghlal | N | 2–1 | S: Marco, Andre; E: Yadollah Akbari |
| 8 | 2001–02 | Asian; Club Championship | 2002-04-05 | Final | (South Korea) Suwon Samsung Bluewings | N | 0–0 (2–4 PSO) | |
| 9 | 2009 | AFC; Champions League | 2009-03-10 | Group stage | (Indonesia) Sriwijaya | A | 4–2 | S: Kim Chi-woo (2), Jung Jo-gook, Kim Seung-yong; SR: Ngon A Djam (2) |
| 10 | 2009 | AFC; Champions League | 2009-03-17 | Group stage | (Japan) Gamba Osaka | H | 2–4 | S: Jung Jo-gook, Lee Sang-hyup; G: Leandro (3), Masato Yamazaki |
| 11 | 2009 | AFC; Champions League | 2009-04-08 | Group stage | (China) Shandong Luneng | A | 0–2 | SL: Lü Zheng, Han Peng |
| 12 | 2009 | AFC; Champions League | 2009-04-21 | Group stage | (China) Shandong Luneng | H | 1–1 | S: Park Yong-ho; SL: Alejandro Cichero |
| 13 | 2009 | AFC; Champions League | 2009-05-05 | Group stage | (Indonesia) Sriwijaya | H | 5–1 | S: Dejan Damjanović (3), Sim Woo-yeon (2); SR: Keith Gumbs |
| 14 | 2009 | AFC; Champions League | 2009-05-20 | Group stage | (Japan) Gamba Osaka | A | 2–1 | S: Dejan Damjanović, Kim Han-yoon; G: Takashi Usami |
| 15 | 2009 | AFC; Champions League | 2009-06-24 | Round of 16 | (Japan) Kashima Antlers | A | 2–2 | S: Lee Seung-yeoul, Ki Sung-yueng; K: Shinzo Koroki, Takeshi Aoki |
| 16 | 2009 | AFC; Champions League | 2009-09-23 | Quarter-finals; 1st leg | (Qatar) Umm-Salal | A | 2–3 | S: Jung Jo-gook (2); U: Magno Alves (2), Fábio César Montezine |
| 17 | 2009 | AFC; Champions League | 2009-09-30 | Quarter-finals; 2nd leg | (Qatar) Umm-Salal | H | 1–1 | S: Dejan Damjanović; U: Aziz Ben Askar |

==== 2010s ====
| # | Season | Competition | Date | Round | Opponent | H / A | Result | Scorer (s) |
|---|---|---|---|---|---|---|---|---|
| 18 | 2011 | AFC; Champions League | 2011-03-02 | Group stage | (United Arab Emirates) Al-Ain | A | 1–0 | S: Dejan Damjanović |
| 19 | 2011 | AFC; Champions League | 2011-03-15 | Group stage | (China) Hangzhou Greentown | H | 3–0 | S: Dejan Damjanović, Ou Kyoung-jun, Mauricio Molina |
| 20 | 2011 | AFC; Champions League | 2011-04-06 | Group stage | (Japan) Nagoya Grampus | A | 1–1 | S: Choi Hyun-tae; N: Kensuke Nagai |
| 21 | 2011 | AFC; Champions League | 2011-04-19 | Group stage | (Japan) Nagoya Grampus | H | 0–2 | N: Mu Kanazaki, Kensuke Nagai |
| 22 | 2011 | AFC; Champions League | 2011-05-04 | Group stage | (United Arab Emirates) Al-Ain | H | 3–0 | S: Dejan Damjanović (2), Go Yo-han |
| 23 | 2011 | AFC; Champions League | 2011-05-11 | Group stage | (China) Hangzhou Greentown | A | 1–1 | S: Bang Seung-hwan; H: Zeng Yue |
| 24 | 2011 | AFC; Champions League | 2011-05-25 | Round of 16 | (Japan) Kashima Antlers | H | 3–0 | S: Bang Seung-hwan, Dejan Damjanović, Koh Myong-jin |
| 25 | 2011 | AFC; Champions League | 2011-09-14 | Quarter-finals; 1st leg | (Saudi Arabia) Al-Ittihad | A | 1–3 | S : Choi Tae-uk; I: Mohammed Noor, Osama Al-Muwallad, Wendel Geraldo |
| 26 | 2011 | AFC; Champions League | 2011-09-27 | Quarter-finals; 2nd leg | (Saudi Arabia) Al-Ittihad | H | 1–0 | S: Mauricio Molina |
| 27 | 2013 | AFC; Champions League | 2013-02-26 | Group stage | (China) Jiangsu Sainty | H | 5–1 | S: Dejan Damjanović (2), Yun Il-lok (2), Mauricio Molina; J : Hamdi Salihi |
| 28 | 2013 | AFC; Champions League | 2013-03-12 | Group stage | (Thailand) Buriram United | A | 0–0 | |
| 29 | 2013 | AFC; Champions League | 2013-04-02 | Group stage | (Japan) Vegalta Sendai | H | 2–1 | S: Sergio Escudero, Kim Jin-kyu; V: Wilson Rodrigues Fonseca |
| 30 | 2013 | AFC; Champions League | 2013-04-10 | Group stage | (Japan) Vegalta Sendai | A | 0–1 | V: Atsushi Yanagisawa |
| 31 | 2013 | AFC; Champions League | 2013-04-24 | Group stage | (China) Jiangsu Sainty | A | 2–0 | S: Koh Myong-jin, Yun Il-lok |
| 32 | 2013 | AFC; Champions League | 2013-05-01 | Group stage | (Thailand) Buriram United | H | 2–2 | S: Jung Seung-yong, Kim Hyun-sung; B: Ekkachai Sumrei, Theeraton Bunmathan |
| 33 | 2013 | AFC; Champions League | 2013-05-14 | Round of 16; 1st leg | (China) Beijing Guoan | A | 0–0 | |
| 34 | 2013 | AFC; Champions League | 2013-05-21 | Round of 16; 2nd leg | (China) Beijing Guoan | H | 3–1 | S: Adilson dos Santos, Yun Il-lok, Koh Myong-jin; B: Frédéric Kanouté |
| 35 | 2013 | AFC; Champions League | 2013-08-21 | Quarter-finals; 1st leg | (Saudi Arabia) Al-Ahli | A | 1–1 | S: Dejan Damjanović; A: Sultan Al-Sawadi |
| 36 | 2013 | AFC; Champions League | 2013-09-18 | Quarter-finals; 2nd leg | (Saudi Arabia) Al-Ahli | H | 1–0 | S: Dejan Damjanović |
| 37 | 2013 | AFC; Champions League | 2013-09-25 | Semi-finals; 1st leg | (Iran) Esteghlal | H | 2–0 | S: Dejan Damjanović, Go Yo-han |
| 38 | 2013 | AFC; Champions League | 2013-10-02 | Semi-finals; 2nd leg | (Iran) Esteghlal | A | 2–2 | S: Ha Dae-sung, Kim Jin-kyu; E: Jlloyd Samuel, Mohammad Ghazi |
| 39 | 2013 | AFC; Champions League | 2013-10-26 | Final; 1st leg | (China) Guangzhou Evergrande | H | 2–2 | S: Sergio Escudero, Dejan Damjanović; G: Elkeson, Gao Lin |
| 40 | 2013 | AFC; Champions League | 2013-11-09 | Final; 2nd leg | (China) Guangzhou Evergrande | A | 1–1 | S: Dejan Damjanović; G: Elkeson |
| 41 | 2014 | AFC; Champions League | 2014-02-25 | Group stage | (Australia) Central Coast Mariners | H | 2–0 | S: Osmar, Yun Il-lok |
| 42 | 2014 | AFC; Champions League | 2014-03-11 | Group stage | (China) Beijing Guoan | A | 1–1 | S: Go Yo-han; B: Utaka |
| 43 | 2014 | AFC; Champions League | 2014-03-19 | Group stage | (Japan) Sanfrecce Hiroshima | A | 1–2 | S: Rafael Costa; H: Yojiro Takahagi, Tsukasa Shiotani |
| 44 | 2014 | AFC; Champions League | 2014-04-01 | Group stage | (Japan) Sanfrecce Hiroshima | H | 2–2 | S: Yun Il-lok, Rafael Costa; H: Gakuto Notsuda, Hwang Seok-ho |
| 45 | 2014 | AFC; Champions League | 2014-04-16 | Group stage | (Australia) Central Coast Mariners | A | 1–0 | S: John Hutchinson (O.G) |
| 46 | 2014 | AFC; Champions League | 2014-04-23 | Group stage | (China) Beijing Guoan | H | 2–1 | S: Kang Seung-jo, Yun Ju-tae; B: Yu Yang |
| 47 | 2014 | AFC; Champions League | 2014-05-07 | Round of 16; 1st leg | (Japan) Kawasaki Frontale | A | 3–2 | S: Sergio Escudero, Kim Chi-woo, Yun Il-lok; K: Yu Kobayashi, Renato |
| 48 | 2014 | AFC; Champions League | 2014-05-14 | Round of 16; 2nd leg | (Japan) Kawasaki Frontale | H | 1–2 | S: Sergio Escudero; K: Yu Kobayashi, Yasuhito Morishima |
| 49 | 2014 | AFC; Champions League | 2014-08-20 | Quarter-finals; 1st leg | (South Korea) Pohang Steelers | A | 0–0 | |
| 50 | 2014 | AFC; Champions League | 2014-08-27 | Quarter-finals; 2nd leg | (South Korea) Pohang Steelers | H | 0–0 (3–0 PSO) | |
| 51 | 2014 | AFC; Champions League | 2014-09-17 | Semi-finals; 1st leg | (Australia) Western Sydney Wanderers | H | 0–0 | |
| 52 | 2014 | AFC; Champions League | 2014-10-01 | Semi-finals; 2nd leg | (Australia) Western Sydney Wanderers | A | 0–2 | W: Mateo Poljak, Shannon Cole |
| 53 | 2015 | AFC; Champions League | 2015-02-17 | Qualifying; Play-off | (Vietnam) Hanoi T&T | H | 7–0 | S: Yun Il-lok, Éverton Santos, Jung Jo-gook (2); Sergio Escudero, Lee Seok-hyun, Koh Myong-jin |
| 54 | 2015 | AFC; Champions League | 2015-02-25 | Group stage | (China) Guangzhou Evergrande Taobao | A | 0–1 | G: Ricardo Goulart |
| 55 | 2015 | AFC; Champions League | 2015-03-04 | Group stage | (Japan) Kashima Antlers | H | 1–0 | S: Kim Jin-kyu |
| 56 | 2015 | AFC; Champions League | 2015-03-18 | Group stage | (Australia) Western Sydney Wanderers | H | 0–0 | |
| 57 | 2015 | AFC; Champions League | 2015-04-07 | Group stage | (Australia) Western Sydney Wanderers | A | 1–1 | S: Go Yo-han; W: Kerem Bulut |
| 58 | 2015 | AFC; Champions League | 2015-04-21 | Group stage | (China) Guangzhou Evergrande Taobao | H | 0–0 | |
| 59 | 2015 | AFC; Champions League | 2015-05-05 | Group stage | (Japan) Kashima Antlers | A | 3–2 | S: Lee Woong-hee, Osmar, Mauricio Molina; K: Shuhei Akasaki, Gaku Shibasaki |
| 60 | 2015 | AFC; Champions League | 2015-05-20 | Round of 16; 1st leg | (Japan) Gamba Osaka | H | 1–3 | S: Yun Ju-tae; O: Takashi Usami (2), Koki Yonekura |
| 61 | 2015 | AFC; Champions League | 2015-05-27 | Round of 16; 2nd leg | (Japan) Gamba Osaka | A | 2–3 | S: Yun Ju-tae (2); O: Patric, Shu Kurata, Lins |
| 62 | 2016 | AFC; Champions League | 2016-02-23 | Group stage | (Thailand) Buriram United | A | 6–0 | S: Adriano (4), Dejan Damjanović, Lee Seok-hyun |
| 63 | 2016 | AFC; Champions League | 2016-03-01 | Group stage | (Japan) Sanfrecce Hiroshima | H | 4–1 | S: Kim Won-sik, Adriano (3); H: Kazuhiko Chiba |
| 64 | 2016 | AFC; Champions League | 2016-03-16 | Group stage | (China) Shandong Luneng | H | 4–1 | S: Adriano (2), Go Yo-han, Dejan Damjanović; S: Jucilei |
| 65 | 2016 | AFC; Champions League | 2016-04-05 | Group stage | (China) Shandong Luneng | A | 0–0 | |
| 66 | 2016 | AFC; Champions League | 2016-04-20 | Group stage | (Thailand) Buriram United | H | 2–1 | S: Dejan Damjanović, Park Yong-woo; B: Andrés Túñez |
| 67 | 2016 | AFC; Champions League | 2016-05-04 | Group stage | (Japan) Sanfrecce Hiroshima | A | 1–2 | S: Adriano; H: Takuma Asano, Yusuke Minagawa |
| 68 | 2016 | AFC; Champions League | 2016-05-18 | Round of 16; 1st leg | (Japan) Urawa Red Diamonds | A | 0–1 | |
| 69 | 2016 | AFC; Champions League | 2016-05-25 | Round of 16; 2nd leg | (Japan) Urawa Red Diamonds | H | 3–2 (7–6 PSO) | S: Dejan Damjanović, Adriano, Go Yo-han; U: Tadanari Lee (2) |
| 70 | 2016 | AFC; Champions League | 2016-08-24 | Quarter-finals; 1st leg | (China) Shandong Luneng | H | 3–1 | S: Dejan Damjanović, Park Chu-young, Adriano; S: Walter Montillo |
| 71 | 2016 | AFC; Champions League | 2016-09-14 | Quarter-finals; 2nd leg | (China) Shandong Luneng | A | 1–1 | S: Yun Ju-tae; S: Walter Montillo |
| 72 | 2016 | AFC; Champions League | 2016-09-28 | Semi-finals; 1st leg | (South Korea) Jeonbuk Hyundai Motors | A | 1–4 | S: Ju Se-jong; J: Leonardo (2), Ricardo Lopes, Kim Shin-wook |
| 73 | 2016 | AFC; Champions League | 2016-10-19 | Semi-finals; 2nd leg | (South Korea) Jeonbuk Hyundai Motors | H | 2–1 | S: Adriano, Ko Kwang-min; J: Ricardo Lopes |
| 74 | 2017 | AFC; Champions League | 2017-02-21 | Group stage | (China) Shanghai SIPG | H | 0–1 | S: Hulk |
| 75 | 2017 | AFC; Champions League | 2017-02-28 | Group stage | (Japan) Urawa Red Diamonds | A | 2–5 | S: Park Chu-young, Dejan Damjanović; U: Yuki Muto, Tadanari Lee, Takahiro Sekine, Tomoya Ugajin, Yoshiaki Komai |
| 76 | 2017 | AFC; Champions League | 2017-03-15 | Group stage | (Australia) Western Sydney Wanderers | H | 2–3 | S: Yun Il-lok (2); W: Lachlan Scott, Terry Antonis, Jaushua Sotirio |
| 77 | 2017 | AFC; Champions League | 2017-04-11 | Group stage | (Australia) Western Sydney Wanderers | A | 3–2 | S: Lee Seok-hyun, Dejan Damjanović (2); W: Terry Antonis, Lachlan Scott |
| 78 | 2017 | AFC; Champions League | 2017-04-26 | Group stage | (China) Shanghai SIPG | A | 2–4 | S: Maurinho, Park Chu-young; S: Hulk, Zhang Wei, Wu Lei, Oscar |
| 79 | 2017 | AFC; Champions League | 2016-05-10 | Group stage | (Japan) Urawa Red Diamonds | H | 1–0 | S: Yoon Seung-won |

==== 2020s ====
| # | Season | Competition | Date | Round | Opponent | H / A | Result | Scorer (s) |
|---|---|---|---|---|---|---|---|---|
| 80 | 2020 | AFC; Champions League | 2020-01-28 | Qualifying; Play-off | (Malaysia) Kedah | H | 4–1 | S: Park Chu-young, Park Dong-jin, Osmar, Ikromjon Alibaev; K: Osmar (O.G) |
| 81 | 2020 | AFC; Champions League | 2020-02-18 | Group stage | (Australia) Melbourne Victory | H | 1–0 | S: Park Chu-young |
| 82 | 2020 | AFC; Champions League | 2020-11-21 | Group stage | (China) Beijing Guoan | N (Note: Matches were played at neutral venues due to the COVID-19 pandemic, with "home" and "away" used for administrative purposes.) | 1–2 | S: Park Chu-young; B: Fernando, Alan |
| 83 | 2020 | AFC; Champions League | 2020-11-24 | Group stage | (Thailand) Chiangrai United | N | 5–0 | S: Han Seung-gyu, Jung Han-min, Yun Ju-tae (2), Lee In-gyu |
| 84 | 2020 | AFC; Champions League | 2020-11-27 | Group stage | (Thailand) Chiangrai United | N | 1–2 | S: Park Chu-young; C: Bill (2) |
| 85 | 2020 | AFC; Champions League | 2020-11-30 | Group stage | (China) Beijing Guoan | N | 1–3 | S: Yun Ju-tae; B: Jonathan Viera, Renato Augusto, Zhang Yuning |
| 86 | 2020 | AFC; Champions League | 2020-12-03 | Group stage | (Australia) Melbourne Victory | N | 1–2 | S: Hwang Hyun-soo; M: Marco Rojas, Jake Brimmer |

| # | Season | Competition | Date | Round | Opponent | H / A | Result | Scorer (s) |
|---|---|---|---|---|---|---|---|---|
| 87 | 2025–26 | AFC; Champions League; Elite | 2025-09-16 | League stage | (Japan) Machida Zelvia | A | 1–1 | S: Marko Dugandžić; M: Henry Heroki Mochizuki |
| 88 | 2025–26 | AFC; Champions League; Elite | 2025-09-30 | League stage | (Thailand) Buriram United | H | 3–0 | S: Choi Jun, Jeong Seung-won, Lucas Rodrigues |
| 89 | 2025–26 | AFC; Champions League; Elite | 2025-10-22 | League stage | (China) Shanghai Shenhua | A | 0–2 | SH: Luís Asué, André Luis |
| 90 | 2025–26 | AFC; Champions League; Elite | 2025-11-04 | League stage | (China) Chengdu Rongcheng | H | 0–0 | |
| 91 | 2025–26 | AFC; Champions League; Elite | 2025-11-25 | League stage | (China) Shanghai Port | A | 3–1 | S: Jesse Lingard (2), Lucas Rodrigues; S: Mateus Vital |
| 92 | 2025–26 | AFC; Champions League; Elite | 2025-12-10 | League stage | (Australia) Melbourne Victory | H | 1–1 | S: Jesse Lingard; M: Marco Rojas, Takeshi Kanamori |
| 93 | 2025–26 | AFC; Champions League; Elite | 2026-02-10 | League stage | (Japan) Vissel Kobe | A | 0–2 | K: Yoshinori Muto, Gōtoku Sakai |
| 94 | 2025–26 | AFC; Champions League; Elite | 2026-02-17 | League stage | (Japan) Sanfrecce Hiroshima | H (Note: Due to various factors, including the schedule for turf repair and maintenance at Seoul World Cup Stadium, the home match was relocated to Mokdong Stadium in Seoul.) | 2–2 | S: Patryk Klimala, Naoto Arai (O.G); H: Ryo Germain, Kosuke Kinoshita |
| 95 | 2025–26 | AFC; Champions League; Elite | 2026-03-04 | Round of 16 1st leg | (Japan) Vissel Kobe | H | 0–1 | K: Matheus Thuler |
| 96 | 2025–26 | AFC; Champions League; Elite | 2026-03-11 | Round of 16 2nd leg | (Japan) Vissel Kobe | A | 1–2 | S: Patryk Klimala; K: Yuya Osako, Yosuke Ideguchi |

| # | Season | Competition | Date | Round | Opponent | H / A | Result | Scorer (s) |
|---|---|---|---|---|---|---|---|---|
| 97 | 2026–27 | AFC; Champions League; Two | 2026-09-16 | Group stage | (Indonesia) Persib | H | 0–1 | P: Júlio César |
| 98 | 2026–27 | AFC; Champions League; Two | 2026-10-14 | Group stage | (Australia) Melbourne Victory | A | 0–3 | M: Guillermo May, Clarismario Santos, Jordi Valadon |
| 99 | 2026–27 | AFC; Champions League; Two | 2026-10-28 | Group stage | (Vietnam) Thể Công–Viettel | A | 5–0 | S: Moon Seon-min, Anderson Oliveira, Hwang Do-yun, Cho Young-wook, Leonardo Acevedo |
| 100 | 2026–27 | AFC; Champions League; Two | 2026-11-04 | Group stage | (Vietnam) Thể Công–Viettel | H | 3–0 | S: Moon Seon-min, Anderson Oliveira, Lucas Alves (O.G) |
| 101 | 2026–27 | AFC; Champions League; Two | 2026-11-25 | Group stage | (Indonesia) Persib | A | | |
| 102 | 2026–27 | AFC; Champions League; Two | 2026-12-02 | Group stage | (Australia) Melbourne Victory | H | | |

=== Friendly Competitions ===
==== 1980s ====
| # | Season | Competition | Date | Round | Opponent | H / A | Result | Scorer (s) |
|---|---|---|---|---|---|---|---|---|
| 1 | 1987 | Winfulai Cup | 1987-01-19 | Group stage | (Hong Kong) Happy Valley | N | 2–0 | S: Park Hang-Seo, Lee Young-jin |
| 2 | 1987 | Winfulai Cup | 1987-01-22 | Group stage | (Hong Kong) Sea Bee | N | 2–1 | S: Unknown, Unknown; SB: Unknown |
| 3 | 1987 | Winfulai Cup | 1987-01-25 | Final | (Hong Kong) South China | N | 0–1 | SC: Chan Fat Chi |
| 4 | 1988 | Lunar New Year Cup | 1988-02-17 | Semi-finals | (Denmark) AGF Aarhus | N | 0–2 | A: Unknown |
| 5 | 1988 | Lunar New Year Cup | 1988-02-21 | Third place play-off | (China) Dalian Shide | N | 3–0 | S: Gu Sang-Bum (2), Kang Deuk-Soo |
| 6 | 1989 | King's Cup | 1989-01-28 | Group stage | Indonesia | N | 2–0 | S: Gu Sang-Bum (2) |
| 7 | 1989 | King's Cup | 1989-01-30 | Group stage | (Switzerland) FC Grenchen | N | 2–0 | S: Choi Jin-Han, Gu Sang-Bum |
| 8 | 1989 | King's Cup | 1989-02-01 | Group stage | Malaysia | N | 3–0 | S: Yoon Sang-Chul, Gu Sang-Bum (2) |
| 9 | 1989 | King's Cup | 1989-02-05 | Group stage | Thailand | N | 2–0 | S: Choi Soon-Ho, Yoon Sang-Chul |
| 10 | 1989 | King's Cup | 1989-02-08 | Semi-finals | (Russia) Rotor Volgograd | N | 0–1 | R: Valeri Chupin |
| 11 | 1989 | King's Cup | 1989-02-10 | Third place play-off | China PR B | N | 2–1 | S: Yoon Sang-Chul, Gu Sang-Bum; C: Xu Hui |

==== 1990s ====
| # | Season | Competition | Date | Round | Opponent | H / A | Result | Scorer (s) |
|---|---|---|---|---|---|---|---|---|
| 12 | 1991 | King's Cup | 1991-01-21 | Group stage | Malaysia U-20 | N | 4–1 | S: Choi Tae-Jin, Yoon Sang-Chul, Lee Young-Ik (2); M: Unknown |
| 13 | 1991 | King's Cup | 1991-01-23 | Group stage | China PR Olympic | N | 1–1 | S: Lee Jang-Wook; C: Unknown |
| 14 | 1991 | King's Cup | 1991-01-25 | Group stage | Thailand | N | 0–1 | T: Unknown |

==== 2000s ====
| # | Season | Competition | Date | Round | Opponent | H / A | Result | Scorer (s) |
|---|---|---|---|---|---|---|---|---|
| 15 | 2002 | ATV Cup (Hong Kong Super Inter Club Cup) | 2002-12-20 | Semi-finals | (Hong Kong) Happy Valley | N | 2–3 | S: Choi Won-kwon, Choi Tae-uk; H: Unknown |
| 16 | 2002 | ATV Cup (Hong Kong Super Inter Club Cup) | 2002-12-22 | Third place play-off | (China) Dalian Shide | N | 1–2 | Unknown |

==== 2010s ====
| # | Season | Competition | Date | Round | Opponent | H / A | Result | Scorer (s) |
|---|---|---|---|---|---|---|---|---|
| 17 | 2017 | Lunar New Year Cup | 2017-01-28 | Semi-finals | (New Zealand) Auckland City | N | 0–1 | A: Emiliano Tade |
| 18 | 2017 | Lunar New Year Cup | 2017-01-31 | Third place play-off | (Thailand) Muangthong United | N | 0–1 | M: Cleiton Silva |
| 19 | 2017 | Saitama City Cup | 2017-02-12 | Final | (Japan) Urawa Reds Diamonds | A | 1–1 (Shared Title) | S: Lee Sang-ho; U: Nagasawa |

== Statistics ==
=== AFC Champions League record ===
==== AFC Champions League ====
| Season | Round | Opposition | Home | Away | Agg. |
|---|---|---|---|---|---|
| 2009 | Group F | (Indonesia) Sriwijaya | 5–1 | 4–2 | 2nd |
| 2009 | Group F | (Japan) Gamba Osaka | 2–4 | 2–1 | 2nd |
| 2009 | Group F | (China) Shandong Luneng | 1–1 | 0–2 | 2nd |
| 2009 | Round of 16 | (Japan) Kashima Antlers | 2–2 (a.e.t.) (5–4 p) | | |
| 2009 | Quarter-final | (Qatar) Umm-Salal | 1–1 | 2–3 | 3–4 |
| 2011 | Group F | (United Arab Emirates) Al-Ain | 3–0 | 1–0 | 1st |
| 2011 | Group F | (China) Hangzhou Greentown | 3–0 | 1–1 | 1st |
| 2011 | Group F | (Japan) Nagoya Grampus | 0–2 | 1–1 | 1st |
| 2011 | Round of 16 | (Japan) Kashima Antlers | 3–0 | | |
| 2011 | Quarter-final | (Saudi Arabia) Al-Ittihad | 1–0 | 1–3 | 2–3 |
| 2013 | Group E | (China) Jiangsu Sainty | 5–1 | 2–0 | 1st |
| 2013 | Group E | (Thailand) Buriram United | 2–2 | 0–0 | 1st |
| 2013 | Group E | (Japan) Vegalta Sendai | 2–1 | 0–1 | 1st |
| 2013 | Round of 16 | (China) Beijing Guoan | 3–1 | 0–0 | 3–1 |
| 2013 | Quarter-final | (Saudi Arabia) Al-Ahli | 1–0 | 1–1 | 2–1 |
| 2013 | Semi-final | (Iran) Esteghlal | 2–0 | 2–2 | 4–2 |
| 2013 | Final | (China) Guangzhou Evergrande | 2–2 | 1–1 | 3–3 (a) |
| 2014 | Group F | (Australia) Central Coast Mariners | 2–0 | 1–0 | 1st |
| 2014 | Group F | (China) Beijing Guoan | 2–1 | 1–1 | 1st |
| 2014 | Group F | (Japan) Sanfrecce Hiroshima | 2–2 | 1–2 | 1st |
| 2014 | Round of 16 | (Japan) Kawasaki Frontale | 1–2 | 3–2 | 4–4 (a) |
| 2014 | Quarter-final | (South Korea) Pohang Steelers | 0–0 (a.e.t.) | 0–0 | 0–0 (3–0 p) |
| 2014 | Semi-final | (Australia) Western Sydney Wanderers | 0–0 | 0–2 | 0–2 |
| 2015 | Play-off | (Vietnam) Hanoi | 7–0 | | |
| 2015 | Group H | (China) Guangzhou Evergrande | 0–0 | 0–1 | 2nd |
| 2015 | Group H | (Japan) Kashima Antlers | 1–0 | 3–2 | 2nd |
| 2015 | Group H | (Australia) Western Sydney Wanderers | 0–0 | 1–1 | 2nd |
| 2015 | Round of 16 | (Japan) Gamba Osaka | 1–3 | 2–3 | 3–6 |
| 2016 | Group F | (Thailand) Buriram United | 2–1 | 6–0 | 1st |
| 2016 | Group F | (Japan) Sanfrecce Hiroshima | 4–1 | 1–2 | 1st |
| 2016 | Group F | (China) Shandong Luneng | 0–0 | 4–1 | 1st |
| 2016 | Round of 16 | (Japan) Urawa Red Diamonds | 3–2 (a.e.t.) | 0–1 | 3–3 (7–6 p) |
| 2016 | Quarter-final | (China) Shandong Luneng | 3–1 | 1–1 | 4–2 |
| 2016 | Semi-final | (South Korea) Jeonbuk Hyundai Motors | 2–1 | 1–4 | 3–5 |
| 2017 | Group F | (China) Shanghai SIPG | 0–1 | 2–4 | 3rd |
| 2017 | Group F | (Japan) Urawa Red Diamonds | 1–0 | 2–5 | 3rd |
| 2017 | Group F | (Australia) Western Sydney Wanderers | 2–3 | 3–2 | 3rd |
| 2020 | Play-off | (Malaysia) Kedah | 4–1 | | |
| 2020 | Group E | (China) Beijing Guoan | 1–2 | 1–3 | 3rd |
| 2020 | Group E | (Australia) Melbourne Victory | 1–0 | 1–2 | 3rd |
| 2020 | Group E | (Thailand) Chiangrai United | 5–0 | 1–2 | 3rd |

==== AFC Champions League Elite ====
| Season | Round | Opposition | Home | Away | Aggregate |
|---|---|---|---|---|---|
| 2025–26 | League stage | (Japan) Machida Zelvia | —N/a | 1–1 | 7th out of 12 |
| 2025–26 | League stage | (Thailand) Buriram United | 3–0 | —N/a | 7th out of 12 |
| 2025–26 | League stage | (China) Shanghai Shenhua | —N/a | 0–2 | 7th out of 12 |
| 2025–26 | League stage | (China) Chengdu Rongcheng | 0–0 | —N/a | 7th out of 12 |
| 2025–26 | League stage | (China) Shanghai Port | —N/a | 3–1 | 7th out of 12 |
| 2025–26 | League stage | (Australia) Melbourne City | 1–1 | —N/a | 7th out of 12 |
| 2025–26 | League stage | (Japan) Vissel Kobe | —N/a | 0–2 | 7th out of 12 |
| 2025–26 | League stage | (Japan) Sanfrecce Hiroshima | 2–2 | —N/a | 7th out of 12 |
| 2025–26 | Round of 16 | (Japan) Vissel Kobe | 0–1 | 1–2 | 1–3 |

==== AFC Champions League Two ====
| Season | Round | Opposition | Home | Away | Agg. |
|---|---|---|---|---|---|
| 2026–27 | Group E | (Indonesia) Persib Bandung | 0–1 | | |
| 2026–27 | Group E | (Australia) Melbourne Victory | | 0–3 | |
| 2026–27 | Group E | (Vietnam) Thể Công–Viettel | 3–0 | 5–0 | |

=== Club ===
As of end of 2013 season

==== By competition ====
| Competition | Pld | W | D | L | GF | GA | GD | Win% |
|---|---|---|---|---|---|---|---|---|
| AFC Champions League | 40 | 17 | 16 | 7 | 71 | 39 | +32 | 42.50 |
| Asian Cup Winners' Cup | 3 | 1 | 0 | 2 | 2 | 5 | −3 | 33.33 |
| Winfulai Cup | 3 | 2 | 0 | 1 | 4 | 2 | +2 | 66.67 |
| Lunar New Year Cup | 2 | 1 | 0 | 1 | 3 | 2 | +1 | 50.00 |
| King's Cup | 9 | 6 | 1 | 2 | 16 | 5 | +11 | 66.67 |
| Total | 57 | 27 | 17 | 13 | 96 | 53 | +43 | 47.37 |

==== AFC competition ====
| Competition | Pld | W | D | L | GF | GA | GD | Win% |
|---|---|---|---|---|---|---|---|---|
| AFC Champions League | 40 | 17 | 16 | 7 | 71 | 39 | +32 | 42.50 |
| Asian Cup Winners' Cup | 3 | 1 | 0 | 2 | 2 | 5 | −3 | 33.33 |
| Total | 43 | 18 | 6 | 9 | 73 | 44 | +29 | 41.86 |

==== By season ====
===== AFC Competitions =====
| Season | Competition | Pld | W | D | L | GF | GA | GD | Win% | Round |
|---|---|---|---|---|---|---|---|---|---|---|
| 1986 | Asian Club Championship | 1 | 0 | 0 | 1 | 0 | 0 | +0 | 0.00 | Group Stage |
| 1999–2000 | Asian Cup Winners' Cup | 3 | 1 | 0 | 2 | 2 | 5 | −3 | 33.33 | Quarter-finals |
| 2001–2002 | Asian Club Championship | 7 | 3 | 4 | 0 | 15 | 3 | +12 | 42.86 | Runners-up |
| 2009 | AFC Champions League | 9 | 3 | 3 | 3 | 19 | 17 | +2 | 33.33 | Quarter-finals |
| 2011 | AFC Champions League | 9 | 5 | 2 | 2 | 14 | 7 | +7 | 55.56 | Quarter-finals |
| 2013 | AFC Champions League | 14 | 6 | 7 | 1 | 23 | 12 | +11 | 42.86 | Runners-up |
| 2014 | AFC Champions League | 12 | 4 | 5 | 3 | 13 | 12 | +1 | 33.33 | Semi-finals |
| 2015 | AFC Champions League | 9 | 3 | 3 | 3 | 15 | 10 | +5 | 33.33 | Round of 16 |
| 2016 | AFC Champions League | 12 | 7 | 2 | 3 | 27 | 15 | +12 | 58.33 | Semi-finals |
| 2017 | AFC Champions League | 6 | 2 | 0 | 4 | 10 | 15 | −5 | 33.33 | Group stage |
| 2020 | AFC Champions League | 7 | 3 | 0 | 4 | 14 | 10 | +4 | 42.86 | Round of 16 |
| 2025–26 | AFC Champions League Elite | 10 | 2 | 4 | 4 | 11 | 12 | −1 | 20.00 | Round of 16 |
| Total | | 99 | 39 | 30 | 30 | 163 | 118 | +45 | 39.39 | |

===== Friendly Competitions =====
| Season | Competition | Pld | W | D | L | GF | GA | GD | Win% | Round |
|---|---|---|---|---|---|---|---|---|---|---|
| 1987 | Winfulai Cup | 3 | 2 | 0 | 1 | 4 | 2 | +2 | 66.67 | Runners-up |
| 1988 | Lunar New Year Cup | 2 | 1 | 0 | 1 | 3 | 2 | +1 | 50.00 | 3rd |
| 1989 | King's Cup | 6 | 5 | 0 | 1 | 11 | 2 | +9 | 83.33 | 3rd |
| 1991 | King's Cup | 3 | 1 | 1 | 1 | 5 | 3 | +2 | 33.33 | Group Stage |
| 2002 | ATV Cup | 2 | 0 | 0 | 2 | 3 | 5 | −2 | 0.00 | Fourth |
| 2017 | Lunar New Year Cup | 2 | 0 | 0 | 2 | 0 | 2 | −2 | 0.00 | Fourth |
| 2017 | Saitama City Cup | 1 | 0 | 1 | 0 | 1 | 1 | +0 | 0.00 | Shared Title |
| Total | | 19 | 9 | 2 | 8 | 27 | 17 | +10 | 47.37 | |

==== By nation ====
| Nation | Pld | W | D | L | GF | GA | GD | Win% |
|---|---|---|---|---|---|---|---|---|
| Bangladesh | 2 | 2 | 0 | 0 | 11 | 0 | +11 | 100.00 |
| China PR | 14 | 6 | 7 | 1 | 25 | 12 | +13 | 42.86 |
| Denmark | 1 | 0 | 0 | 1 | 0 | 2 | −2 | 0.00 |
| Hong Kong | 3 | 2 | 0 | 1 | 4 | 2 | +2 | 66.67 |
| Indonesia | 3 | 3 | 0 | 0 | 11 | 3 | +8 | 100.00 |
| Iran | 3 | 2 | 1 | 0 | 6 | 3 | +3 | 66.67 |
| Japan | 11 | 3 | 3 | 5 | 15 | 18 | −3 | 27.27 |
| Korea Republic | 2 | 0 | 2 | 0 | 0 | 0 | +0 | 0.00 |
| Macau | 1 | 0 | 0 | 1 | 0 | 0 | +0 | 0.00 |
| Malaysia | 2 | 2 | 0 | 0 | 7 | 1 | +6 | 100.00 |
| Qatar | 2 | 0 | 1 | 1 | 3 | 4 | −1 | 0.00 |
| Russia | 1 | 0 | 0 | 1 | 0 | 1 | −1 | 0.00 |
| Saudi Arabia | 4 | 2 | 1 | 1 | 4 | 4 | +0 | 50.00 |
| Singapore | 1 | 1 | 0 | 0 | 0 | 0 | +0 | 100.00 |
| Swiss | 1 | 1 | 0 | 0 | 2 | 0 | +2 | 100.00 |
| Thailand | 4 | 1 | 2 | 1 | 4 | 3 | +1 | 25.00 |
| UAE | 2 | 2 | 0 | 0 | 4 | 0 | +4 | 100.00 |
| Total | 57 | 27 | 17 | 13 | 96 | 53 | +43 | 47.37 |

=== Players ===
As of end of 2014 season

==== Appearance Leaders Top 5 ====
| Ranking | Name | Apps | Seasons | Notes |
|---|---|---|---|---|
| 1 | (South Korea) Go Yo-han | 33 | 2004–present | |
| 2 | (South Korea) Koh Myong-jin | 31 | 2003–present | |
| 2 | (Montenegro) Dejan Damjanović | 31 | 2008–2013 | |
| 4 | (Brazil) Adilson dos Santos | 29 | 2006–2013 | |
| 5 | (South Korea) Kim Yong-dae | 27 | 2010–present | |

==== Goal Leaders Top 5 ====
| Ranking | Name | Goals | Matches | Goals per Match | Seasons | Notes |
|---|---|---|---|---|---|---|
| 1 | (Montenegro) Dejan Damjanović | 17 | 31 | 0.55 | 2008–2013 | |
| 2 | (South Korea) Yun Il-lok | 7 | 20 | 0.35 | 2013–present | |
| 3 | (Brazil) Ricardo Campos da Costa | 5 | 4+? | ? | 2000-2004 | |
| 4 | (South Korea) Jung Jo-gook | 4 | 7 | 0.57 | 2003–present | |
| 5 | (Japan) Sergio Escudero | 4 | 23 | 0.17 | 2012–present | |

==== Clean Sheets Leaders Top 5 ====
| Ranking | Name | Clean Sheets | Matches | Clean Sheets per Match | Seasons | Notes |
|---|---|---|---|---|---|---|
| 1 | (South Korea) Kim Yong-dae | 11 | 27 | 0.41 | 2010–present | |
| 2 | (South Korea) Yu Sang-hun | 3 | 5 | 0.60 | 2011–present | |
| 3 | (South Korea) Shin Eui-son | 2 | 5+? | ? | 2000–2004 | |
| 4 | (South Korea) Han Il-koo | 1 | 2 | 0.50 | 2010–present | |

== Awards ==
=== Club ===
==== Most Organized Club ====
| # | Year | Award Descriptions | Notes |
|---|---|---|---|
| 1 | 2009 | In all clubs of 2009 AFC Champions League, FC Seoul was most organized home matches. | |

==== AFC Champions League Fair Play Award ====
| # | Year | Award Descriptions | Notes |
|---|---|---|---|
| 1 | 2013 | Took lowest number of red cards, yellow cards, disciplinary of all clubs | |

=== Individual ===
==== AFC Coach of the Year ====
| # | Year | Coach | Notes |
|---|---|---|---|
| 1 | 2013 | (South Korea) Choi Yong-Soo | |

==== AFC Champions League Dream Team ====
| Year | Substitute | Goalkeeper | Defenders | Midfielders | Forwards | Sum | Notes |
|---|---|---|---|---|---|---|---|
| 2013 | (South Korea) Kim Jin-kyu (DF) (South Korea) Ha Dae-Sung (MF) | (South Korea) Kim Yong-dae | | | (Montenegro) Dejan Damjanović | 4 | |
| 2014 | (South Korea) Cha Du-ri (DF) (South Korea) Kim Ju-young (DF) (South Korea) Yun Il-lok (MF) | | | | | 3 | |
| Total | | | | | | 7 | |

== See also ==
- FC Seoul records and statistics
- South Korean clubs in the Asian Club Championship
- South Korean clubs in the AFC Champions League
