= 2005 FC Seoul season =

FC Seoul
2005 season
- Chairman: Huh Chang-Soo
- Manager: Lee Jang-Soo
- K-League: 7th
- FA Cup: Round of 16
- League Cup: 5th
- Top goalscorer: League: Park Chu-young (12); All: Park Chu-young (18)
- Highest home attendance: 48,375 vs Pohang (League, 10 July)
- Lowest home attendance: 10,133 vs Bucheon (League, 19 June)
- Average home league attendance: 22,010
Home colours	Away colours

== Competitions ==
=== Overview ===
Competition	Starting round	Final position	Record							
Competition	Starting round	Final position	Pld	W	D	L	GF	GA	GD	Win %
K League	Matchday 1	Matchday 38					—			
FA Cup	Round of 32						—			
League Cup	Group stage						—			
Total			0	0	0	0	0	0	+0	—

Last updated: 31 December 2005
Source: Fixtures and Results at FC Seoul Official Website

== Match reports and match highlights ==
Fixtures and Results at FC Seoul Official Website (in English)

== Season statistics ==
=== K League records ===
Season	Teams	Final Position	League Position	Pld	W	D	L	GF	GA	GD	Pts	Manager
2005	13	7th	6th	24	8	8	8	37	32	+5	32	(South Korea) Lee Jang-Soo

- 2005 season's league position was decided by aggregate points,
  because this season had first stage and second stage.

=== All competitions records ===
Season	Teams	K-League	Championship	League Cup	FA Cup	AFC Champions League	Manager
2005	13	7th	Did not qualify	5th	Round of 16	Did not qualify	(South Korea) Lee Jang-Soo

=== Attendance records ===
Season	Season Total Att.	K League Total Att.	Regular season Average Att.	League Cup Average Att.	FA Cup Total / Average Att.	ACL Total / Average Att.	Friendly Match Att.	Att. Ranking	Notes
2005	458,605	458,605	22,010	32,415	No home match	N/A	Unknown (Boca Juniors)	K League Season; Total Att. 1st	

- Season total attendance is K League Regular Season, League Cup, FA Cup, AFC Champions League in the aggregate and friendly match attendance is not included.
- K League season total attendance is K League Regular Season and League Cup in the aggregate.

== Squad statistics ==
=== Goals ===
Pos	K League	League Cup	FA Cup	AFC Champions League	Total	Notes
1	(South Korea) Park Chu-Young (12)	(South Korea) Park Chu-Young (6)	(South Korea) Kim Eun-Jung (1) (South Korea) Han Dong-Won (1) (South Korea) Jung Jo-Gook (1)	Did not qualify	(South Korea) Park Chu-Young (18)	
2	(South Korea) Kim Eun-Jung (7)	(Brazil) Nonato (5)	N/A	Did not qualify	(South Korea) Kim Eun-Jung (8)	
3	(South Korea) Jung Jo-Gook (3)	(Portugal) Ricardo (3)	N/A	Did not qualify	(Brazil) Nonato (7)	
4	(South Korea) Kim Dong-Jin (3)	(South Korea) Lee Won-Shik (1)	No scorer	Did not qualify	(Portugal) Ricardo (4) (South Korea) Jung Jo-Gook (4)	
5	(Brazil) Nonato (2)	(South Korea) Han Tae-You (1)	No scorer	Did not qualify	N/A	

=== Assists ===
Pos	K League	League Cup	Total	Notes
1	(Portugal) Ricardo (9)	(Portugal) Ricardo (5)	(Portugal) Ricardo (14)	
2	(South Korea) Park Chu-Young (3)	(South Korea) Kim Eun-Jung (4)	(South Korea) Kim Eun-Jung (7)	
3	(South Korea) Kim Eun-Jung (3)	(South Korea) Kim Chi-Gon (1)	(South Korea) Park Chu-Young (4)	
4	(South Korea) Kim Seung-Yong (2)	(South Korea) Jung Jo-Gook (1)	(South Korea) Kim Seung-Yong (2)	
5	(South Korea) Lee Ki-Hyung (1)	(South Korea) Park Chu-Young (1)	(South Korea) Kim Chi-Gon (2)	

== Coaching staff ==
Position	Name	Period	Notes
Manager	(South Korea) Lee Jang-Soo		
Assistant manager	(South Korea) Lee Young-jin		
First-team coach	(South Korea) Ko Jeong-Woon		
First-team coach	(Tajikistan) (South Korea) Shin Eui-Son	2005/05/02–2005/12/31	Player Retired (1 May 2005)
Player Coach	(Tajikistan) (South Korea) Shin Eui-Son	2005/01/01–2005/05/01	0 caps in K-League
Reserve Team Manager	(South Korea) Choi Ki-Bong		
Reserve Team Coach	(South Korea) Son Hyun-Jun		
Goalkeeping coach	(Brazil) Leandro		
Fitness coach	(Brazil) Flavio		
Technical director & Chief Scout	(South Korea) Kim Sung-Nam		

== Players ==
=== Team squad ===
All players registered for the 2005 season are listed.

Note: Flags indicate national team as defined under FIFA eligibility rules; some limited exceptions apply. Players may hold more than one non-FIFA nationality.

No.	Pos.	Nation	Player
1	GK	KOR	Weon Jong-Teok
2	DF	KOR	Kwak Tae-Hwi
3	DF	KOR	Park Jung-Suk
4	DF	KOR	Kim Dong-Jin
5	DF	KOR	Lee Min-Sung (captain)
6	MF	KOR	Lee Ki-Hyung
7	MF	KOR	Choi Won-Kwon
8	MF	KOR	Kim Seong-Jae
9	FW	KOR	Jung Jo-Gook
10	FW	KOR	Park Chu-Young
11	FW	KOR	Lee Won-Shik
13	FW	KOR	Park Sung-Bae (Out)
15	MF	KOR	Han Tae-You
16	MF	BRA	Silva
17	DF	KOR	Kim Chi-Gon
18	FW	KOR	Kim Eun-Jung
19	DF	KOR	Lee Jung-Youl
20	FW	BRA	Nonato
21	FW	KOR	Han Dong-Won
22	MF	KOR	Baek Ji-Hoon
23	MF	KOR	Kim Byung-Chae
24	MF	KOR	Lee Ji-Nam (Conscripted)

No.	Pos.	Nation	Player
25	MF	KOR	Kim Seung-Yong
26	MF	KOR	Lee Sang-Hup
27	MF	KOR	Cho Sung-Yong (Conscripted)
28	DF	KOR	Ku Kyung-Hyun (Conscripted)
29	DF	KOR	Choi Jae-Soo
30	GK	KOR	Back Min-Chul
31	GK	KOR	Kim Ho-Jun
32	MF	KOR	Kim Tae-Jin
33	MF	KOR	Ahn Sang-Hyun
34	DF	KOR	Jung Sung-Ho
35	MF	KOR	Song Jin-Hyung
36	MF	KOR	Koh Myong-Jin
37	MF	KOR	Kim Dong-Suk
38	DF	KOR	Lee Kwang-Hee
39	FW	KOR	Jung Jae-Yoon (Conscripted)
40	MF	KOR	Lee Chung-Yong
41	GK	KOR	Park Dong-Suk
42	MF	KOR	Bae Hae-Min
43	MF	KOR	Lee Ik-Sung (Conscripted)
47	MF	KOR	Go Yo-Han
49	DF	POR	Franco
50	MF	POR	Ricardo Nascimento

=== Out on loan & military service ===
Note: Flags indicate national team as defined under FIFA eligibility rules; some limited exceptions apply. Players may hold more than one non-FIFA nationality.

No.	Pos.	Nation	Player
—	FW	KOR	Park Sung-bae (to (South Korea) Busan IPark until December 2005)
—	DF	KOR	Park Sung-ho (to (South Korea) Police FC until November 2005 / Discharged)
—	DF	KOR	Shin Jae-pil (to (South Korea) Police FC until November 2005 / Discharged)
—	DF	KOR	Lee Jun-ki (to (South Korea) Police FC until November 2005 / / Discharged)
—	MF	KOR	Park Yun-hwa (to (South Korea) Gwangju Sangmu until November 2005 / Discharged)
—	FW	KOR	Han Jung-hwa (to (South Korea) Gwangju Sangmu until November 2005 / Discharged)
—	FW	KOR	Park Jung-hwan (to (South Korea) Gwangju Sangmu until November 2005 / Discharged)

No.	Pos.	Nation	Player
—	DF	KOR	Yoon Hong-chang (to (South Korea) Police FC until November 2006)
—	MF	KOR	Jung Chang-kyun (to (South Korea) Police FC until November 2006)
—	DF	KOR	Park Yong-ho (to (South Korea) Gwangju Sangmu until November 2006)
—	DF	KOR	Park Yo-seb (to (South Korea) Gwangju Sangmu until December 2006)

- In: Transferred from other teams in the middle of season.
- Out: Transferred to other teams in the middle of season.
- Discharged: Transferred from Gwangju Sangmu and Police FC for military service after end of season. (Not registered in 2005 season.)
- Conscripted: Transferred to Gwangju Sangmu and Police FC for military service after end of season.

== Tactics ==
=== Starting eleven and formation ===
This section shows the most used players for each position considering a 3-5-2 formation.

No.	Pos.	Nat.	Name	MS	Notes
41	GK	(South Korea)	Park Dong-Suk		
19	DF	(South Korea)	Lee Jung-Youl		
5	DF	(South Korea)	Lee Min-Sung		
17	DF	(South Korea)	Kim Chi-Gon		
29	MF	(South Korea)	Choi Jae-Soo		
8	MF	(South Korea)	Kim Seong-Jae		
50	MF	(Portugal)	Ricardo		
22	MF	(South Korea)	Baek Ji-Hoon		
4	MF	(South Korea)	Kim Dong-Jin		
18	FW	(South Korea)	Kim Eun-Jung		
10	FW	(South Korea)	Park Chu-Young		

Source: Squad stats and Start formations.
Only competitive matches.
Using the most used start formation.
Ordered by position on pitch (from back right to front left).

=== Substitutes ===
No.	Pos.	Nat.	Name	MS	Notes
1	GK	(South Korea)	Weon Jong-Teok		
2	DF	(South Korea)	Kwak Tae-Hwi		
15	MF	(South Korea)	Han Tae-You		
9	FW	(South Korea)	Jung Jo-Gook		
11	FW	(South Korea)	Lee Won-Sik		
25	FW	(South Korea)	Kim Seung-Yong		

Source: Squad stats and Start formations.
Only competitive matches.
Using the most used start formation.
Ordered by position on pitch (from back right to front left).

== See also ==
- FC Seoul
