= Lim Jong-kuk =

South Korean footballer and coach

Lim Jong-kuk 임종국
Personal information
- Full name: Lim Jong-kuk
- Date of birth: April 13, 1968 (age 58)
- Place of birth: South Korea
- Height: 1.85 m (6 ft 1 in)
- Position: Goalkeeper

Youth career
- 1987–1990: Dankook University

Senior career*
Years	Team	Apps	(Gls)
1991–2000	LG Cheetahs / Anyang LG Cheetahs	79	(0)
1993–1995	→ Sangmu (military service)		
2001	Busan IPark	0	(0)

Managerial career
- 2001–2002: Gangneung FC (Player Coach)
- 2003–2010: Gwangju Sangmu (Coach)
- 2011: Sangju Sangmu (Coach)
- 2012: Gangwon FC Academy (Coach)
- 2013: Jeonbuk KSPO WFC (Coach)
- * Club domestic league appearances and goals as of 7 October 2015 ‡ National team caps and goals as of 7 October 2015

Lim Jong-kuk (born April 13, 1968) is a retired football player and goalkeeper coach.

He played in K League Classic side LG Cheetahs, Busan IPark.
