= Choi Yoon-yeol =

South Korean footballer (born 1974)

Choi Yoon-yeol 최윤열
Personal information
- Full name: Choi Yoon-yeol
- Date of birth: April 17, 1974 (age 52)
- Place of birth: Andong, Gyeongbuk, South Korea
- Height: 1.85 m (6 ft 1 in)
- Position: Defender

Youth career
- 1993–1996: Kyunghee University

Senior career*
Years	Team	Apps	(Gls)
1997–2000	Jeonnam Dragons	45	(0)
2000–2002	Anyang LG Cheetahs	49	(0)
2003	Pohang Steelers	34	(2)
2004–2007	Daejeon Citizen	52	(2)
2010	Cheongju Jikji FC		

International career^{‡}
1995–1996	South Korea U23	27	(0)
1995–1999	South Korea	11	(0)
- * Club domestic league appearances and goals as of 18 November 2008 ‡ National team caps and goals as of 18 November 2008

Choi Yoon-yeol (born 17 April 1974) is a South Korean former football player.

Born in Andong, South Korea, he started his professional football career at Chunnam Dragons and played for the Anyang LG Cheetahs, Pohang Steelers, and Daejeon Citizen. Before the 2008 season, he retired from professional football. In 2010, he moved to Cheongju Jikji FC as an amateur footballer.

He played for the South Korea national football team and was a participant at the 1996 Summer Olympics and 1998 Asian Games.

== Club career statistics ==
Club performance			League		Cup		League Cup		Continental		Total	
Season	Club	League	Apps	Goals	Apps	Goals	Apps	Goals	Apps	Goals	Apps	Goals
South Korea			League		KFA Cup		League Cup		Asia		Total	
1997	Chunnam Dragons	K League	13	0	?	?	16	0	–			
1998	Chunnam Dragons	K League	18	0	?	?	13	0	?	?		
1999	Chunnam Dragons	K League	14	0	?	?	7	1	?	?		
2000	Chunnam Dragons	K League	0	0	?	?	0	0	–			
2000	Anyang LG Cheetahs	K League	7	0	?	?	0	0	?	?		
2001	Anyang LG Cheetahs	K League	22	0	?	?	0	0	?	?		
2002	Anyang LG Cheetahs	K League	20	0	?	?	7	0	?	?		
2003	Pohang Steelers	K League	34	2	3	0	–		–		37	2
2004	Daejeon Citizen	K League	11	0	1	0	2	0	–		14	0
2005	Daejeon Citizen	K League	18	1	1	0	8	0	–		27	1
2006	Daejeon Citizen	K League	8	1	1	0	12	0	–		21	1
2007	Daejeon Citizen	K League	15	0	0	0	5	0	–		20	0
Total	South Korea		180	4			70	1				
Career total			180	4			70	1				

Sporting positions
Preceded by Son Hyun-jun	Anyang LG Cheetahs captain 2002	Succeeded by Kim Seong-jae
