= Ricardo (footballer, born June 1976) =

Brazilian footballer

Personal information
- Full name: Ricardo Campos da Costa
- Date of birth: 8 June 1976 (age 50)
- Place of birth: Brazil
- Height: 1.89 m (6 ft 2 in)
- Position: Midfielder

Senior career*
Years	Team	Apps	(Gls)
?–2000	Marília Atlético Clube	?	(?)
2000–2004	Anyang LG Cheetahs / FC Seoul	117	(18)
2005–2006	Seongnam Ilhwa Chunma	35	(1)
2006	Busan IPark	10	(0)
2006	Marília Atlético Clube	?	(?)
- * Club domestic league appearances and goals

Ricardo Campos da Costa (born 8 June 1976) is a Brazilian former professional footballer who played as a midfielder.

== Club career ==
He played for FC Seoul, Seongnam Ilhwa Chunma, Busan IPark of the South Korean K League.

== Style of play ==
Ricardo was considered to be one of the best and versatile midfielders in K League. He played in several midfield positions during his career, his main midfield position is defensive midfielder, but he also played as attacking midfielder in K League.
