= Ricardo Nascimento =

Portuguese footballer (born 1974)

Personal information
- Full name: Ricardo Nuno Queirós Nascimento
- Date of birth: 19 April 1974 (age 52)
- Place of birth: Vila Nova de Gaia, Portugal
- Height: 1.82 m (6 ft 0 in)
- Position: Attacking midfielder

Youth career
- 1985–1988: Porto
- 1988–1992: Leixões

Senior career*
Years	Team	Apps	(Gls)
1992–1994	Leixões	33	(0)
1994–1997	Boavista	4	(0)
1995–1996	→ Aves (loan)	29	(7)
1998	Varzim	27	(0)
1998–1999	Aves	31	(7)
1999–2000	Gil Vicente	25	(5)
2000–2001	Montpellier	4	(0)
2001	Gil Vicente	11	(2)
2002	Braga	12	(0)
2002–2003	Salgueiros	31	(6)
2003–2004	Maia	31	(12)
2004–2005	Rio Ave	19	(3)
2005–2007	FC Seoul	47	(3)
2007–2008	Trofense	18	(2)
2008–2010	Aves	13	(1)
2014–2015	Candal	19	(2)
Total		354	(50)

International career
1993	Portugal U20	1	(0)
1993	Portugal U21	3	(0)
- * Club domestic league appearances and goals

Ricardo Nuno Queirós Nascimento (born 19 April 1974) is a Portuguese retired professional footballer who played as an attacking midfielder.

He amassed Primeira Liga totals of 102 matches and 11 goals over seven seasons, in representation of Boavista, Varzim, Gil Vicente, Braga and Rio Ave. He added 182 matches and 34 goals in the Segunda Liga, and also spent two years in South Korea.

== Club career ==
Born in Vila Nova de Gaia, Porto District, Nascimento started his professional career with Leixões SC, competing with the club in the second division. He went on to make 283 league appearances for a host of teams in his country, including Boavista FC, Varzim SC, Gil Vicente F.C. and S.C. Braga; prior to the two latter sides, in 2000–01, he had his first abroad experience, with Montpellier HSC: the French promoted from Ligue 2, but the player only played seven matches in the entire campaign.

Nascimento had an Asian adventure from February 2005, appearing for South Korea's FC Seoul which he joined on a free transfer from Rio Ave FC. In January 2008 he returned to Portugal, contributing with 14 games to C.D. Trofense's first ever promotion to the Primeira Liga.

After leaving Trofense in November 2008, Nascimento signed for C.D. Aves for a third spell, moving to the second level team until the end of the campaign. He stated: «I'm back to the club of my heart» upon his arrival, and left in June 2010 at the age of 36, being rarely used during his final spell and retiring shortly afterwards.

== Honours ==
FC Seoul

- Korean League Cup: 2006; runner-up 2007

Trofense

- Segunda Liga: 2007–08

Individual

- K League Top Assists Award: 2005
