= Dragan Stojisavljević =

Serbian footballer (born 1974)

Personal information
- Full name: Dragan Stojisavljević
- Date of birth: 6 January 1974 (age 52)
- Place of birth: Titov Vrbas, SFR Yugoslavia
- Height: 1.80 m (5 ft 11 in)
- Position: Winger

Senior career*
Years	Team	Apps	(Gls)
1991–1993	Vrbas	44	(5)
1993–1997	Hajduk Kula	76	(13)
1997–2000	Partizan	71	(5)
2000–2001	Anyang LG Cheetahs	36	(6)
2002–2003	Hajduk Kula	35	(4)
2003–2004	FC Seoul	18	(5)
2004	Incheon United	0	(0)
Total		296	(38)
- * Club domestic league appearances and goals

Dragan Stojisavljević (Serbian Cyrillic: Драган Стојисављевић; born 6 January 1974) is a Serbian former professional footballer who played as a winger.

== Club career ==
After starting out with his hometown club Vrbas, Stojisavljević went on to play for Hajduk Kula and Partizan in the First League of FR Yugoslavia.

Between February 2000 – 2001 and June 2003-July 2004, Stojisavljević played for FC Seoul (then known as Anyang LG Cheetahs).

July 2004 – 2004, he played for Incheon United.

He also played for his former club Hajduk Kula from early 2002 to mid-2003 (an 18-month spell).

== Career statistics ==
Club	Season	League	
Club	Season	Apps	Goals
Hajduk Kula	1993–94	5	0
Hajduk Kula	1994–95	26	4
Hajduk Kula	1995–96	30	5
Hajduk Kula	1996–97	15	4
Hajduk Kula	2001–02	7	1
Hajduk Kula	2002–03	28	3
Total		111	17

- FC Seoul

2000–2001: League 36 matches-6 goals / League Cup: 12 matches-0 goal
June 2003–July 2004: League 18 matches-5 goals / League Cup: None

- Incheon United

July 2004 – 2004: League: None / League Cup 4 matches-0 goal

== Honours ==
Partizan

- First League of FR Yugoslavia: 1998–99
- FR Yugoslavia Cup: 1997–98

Anyang LG Cheetahs

- K League: 2000
- Korean Super Cup: 2001
