= Ko Jae-wook =

South Korean footballer and manager

Ko Jae-wook 고재욱
Personal information
- Full name: Ko Jae-wook
- Date of birth: December 20, 1951 (age 74)
- Place of birth: Chungmu, Gyeongnam, South Korea
- Position: Midfielder

Team information
- Current team: Kwandong University

Youth career
- 1970–1974: Korea University

Senior career*
Years	Team	Apps	(Gls)
1974–1976	Kookmin Bank FC (Semi-professional)		
1974–1975	→ Army FC (Military service)		

International career
1971–1975	South Korea		

Managerial career
- 1979–1983: Joongdong High School
- 1984–1987: Lucky-Goldstar (Coach)
- 1988: Lucky-Goldstar (Caretaker manager)
- 1989–1993: Lucky-Goldstar
- 1991: → South Korea
- 1995–2000: Ulsan Hyundai Horangi
- 1995: → South Korea
- 2001–2011: Kwandong University
- * Club domestic league appearances and goals

- Ko Jae-wook
- Hangul: 고재욱
- RR: Go Jaeuk
- MR: Ko Chaeuk

Ko Jae-wook is a former Korean footballer and football manager.

He was a member of Korean national football team for five years in the 1970s. He played in the 1974 FIFA World Cup qualifying match against Australia, scoring the equalizing goal. A training injury to his knee ended his playing career.

His first managerial post was at his alma mater, Joongdong High School. Under his management, the Joongdong team won a number of honours. Ko Jae-wook joined Lucky-Goldstar Hwangso as coach in 1984, and was appointed manager in 1989. Ko, with Lucky-Goldstar Hwangso, won the 1990 K-League title. He was appointed manager of Ulsan Hyundai Horangi in December 1994. In his second season (1996), Ulsan Hyundai Horang-i won the K-League title.

== International Tournament ==
- 1972 Mereudekakeop years
- 1974 FIFA World Cup Asian qualifying round
- 1974 The 7th Asian Games in

== Honours ==
=== Manager ===
Lucky-Goldstar Hwangso

- K-League : 1990

Ulsan Hyundai Horangi

- K-League : 1996

== See also ==
- Football (soccer)
