= Shin Jae-heum =

South Korean footballer (born 1959)

Shin Jae-Heum
Personal information
- Full name: Shin Jae-Heum
- Date of birth: March 26, 1959 (age 67)
- Place of birth: South Korea
- Height: 1.74 m (5 ft 9 in)
- Position: Defender

Team information
- Current team: Yonsei University

Youth career
- 1978–1982: Yonsei University

Senior career*
Years	Team	Apps	(Gls)
1982	Daewoo (semi-professional)		
1983	Daewoo Royals	1	(0)
1984–1985	Lucky-Goldstar Hwangso	27	(1)
?	Housing & Commercial Bank		

Managerial career
- Housing & Commercial Bank (Coach)
- 1999–2002: Anyang LG Cheetahs (Coach)
- Chunnam Dragons (Chief scout)
- 2005–: Yonsei University
- * Club domestic league appearances and goals as of 27 December 2007 ‡ National team caps and goals as of 27 December 2007

Shin Jae-Heum (Korean: 신재흠, born March 26, 1959, in South Korea) is a South Korean footballer.
