= Park Chung-il =

South Korean footballer (born 1959)

Personal information
- Date of birth: November 19, 1959 (age 66)
- Place of birth: South Korea
- Height: 1.71 m (5 ft 7 in)
- Position: Forward

Senior career*
Years	Team	Apps	(Gls)
1984	Lucky-Goldstar Hwangso	18	(4)
- * Club domestic league appearances and goals as of 27 December 2013 ‡ National team caps and goals as of 27 December 2013

- Park Chung-il
- Hangul: 박정일
- Hanja: 朴晶一
- RR: Bak Jeongil
- MR: Pak Chŏngil

Park Chung-il (Korean: 박정일, born November 19, 1959) is a South Korean footballer. He was first goal scorer of FC Seoul, then known as Lucky-Goldstar Hwangso.

== Club career ==
- 1984 : Lucky-Goldstar Hwangso
