= Park Se-hak =

South Korean footballer

Park Se-Hak 박세학
Personal information
- Full name: Park Se-Hak
- Date of birth: January 1, 1936 (age 90)
- Place of birth: Seoul, South Korea
- Date of death: December 21, 2021 (aged 85)
- Place of death: Unknown
- Position: Midfielder

Youth career
- Hanyang Technical High School

Senior career*
Years	Team	Apps	(Gls)
1958–1968	Korea Tungsten Company FC		

Managerial career
- 1976–1983: Navy FC (ko:해룡 축구단 (Haeryong FC))
- 1980: South Korea B
- 1982: South Korea B
- 1983–1987: Lucky-Goldstar Hwagso
- * Club domestic league appearances and goals

- Park Se-hak
- Hangul: 박세학
- RR: Bak Sehak
- MR: Pak Sehak

Park Se-Hak was a South Korean association football player. He retired from Korea Tungsten Company FC in 1968.
After 8 years, He was returned to as manager of Navy FC. Under his management, Navy FC became a strong team and won many championships.

Park Se-Hak appointed the first manager of Lucky-Goldstar Hwangso in August 1983, In his second season (1985), Lucky-Goldstar Hwangso won first K-League title

== Honours ==
=== Manager ===
Lucky-Goldstar Hwangso

- K-League: 1985

Lucky-Goldstar Hwangso

- K-League Manager of the Year Award: 1985
