= 1985 K League =

Korean Super League
- Season: 1985
- Dates: 13 April – 22 September 1985
- Champions: Lucky-Goldstar Hwangso (1st title)
- Asian Club Championship: Lucky-Goldstar Hwangso
- Matches: 84
- Goals: 189 (2.25 per match)
- Best Player: Han Moon-bae
- Top goalscorer: Piyapong Pue-on & Kim Yong-se (12 goals each)
- Best goalkeeper: Kim Hyun-tae
- Highest scoring: Daewoo 4–3 Sangmu (1 September 1985)
- Longest winning run: 5 matches POSCO Atoms
- Longest unbeaten run: 7 matches POSCO Atoms

The 1985 Korean Super League was the third season of top football league in South Korea. A total of eight teams participated in the league. Six of them were professional teams (Hallelujah FC, Yukong Elephants, Daewoo Royals, POSCO Atoms, Lucky-Goldstar Hwangso and Hyundai Horang-i), and two of them were semi-professional teams. (Hanil Bank and Sangmu FC). It began on 13 April and ended on 22 September.

== Schedule ==
Date	Place	Stadium
13–14 April	Seoul	Dongdaemun Stadium
20–21 April	Incheon	Incheon Sungui Stadium
27–28 April	Jeonju	Jeonju Stadium
1–2 May	Busan	Busan Gudeok Stadium
11–12 May	Masan	Masan Stadium
17–18 May	Uijeongbu	Uijeongbu Sports Complex
27–28 May	Gyeongju	Gyeongju Civic Stadium
18–19 June	Uijeongbu	Uijeongbu Sports Complex
22–23 June	Gangneung	Gangneung Stadium
25–26 June	Gangneung	Gangneung Stadium
29–30 June	Pohang	Pohang Sports Complex
2 July	Busan	Busan Gudeok Stadium
6–7 July	Jinju	Jinju Public Stadium
13–14 July	Seoul	Hyochang Stadium
18 July	Seoul	Dongdaemun Stadium
24–25 August	Incheon	Incheon Sungui Stadium
28–29 August	Seoul	Dongdaemun Stadium
31 August – 1 September	Cheongju	Cheongju Sports Complex
7–8 September	Gumi	Gumi Civic Stadium
10–11 September	Gumi	Gumi Civic Stadium
14–15 September	Ulsan	Ulsan Stadium
21–22 September	Incheon	Incheon Sungui Stadium

== Foreign players ==
Team	Player 1	Player 2	Player 3
Daewoo Royals			
Hallelujah FC			
Hanil Bank			
Hyundai Horang-i	(Netherlands) Rob Landsbergen		
Lucky-Goldstar Hwangso	(Thailand) Piyapong Pue-on		
POSCO Dolphins	(Brazil) Flávio Almeida	(Brazil) Paulinho Criciúma	(Germany) Dietmar Schacht
Sangmu FC			
Yukong Elephants			

== League table ==
Pos	Team	Pld	W	D	L	GF	GA	GD	Pts	Qualification
1	Lucky-Goldstar Hwangso (C)	21	10	7	4	35	19	+16	27	Qualification for the Asian Club Championship
2	POSCO Atoms	21	9	7	5	25	17	+8	25	
3	Daewoo Royals	21	9	7	5	22	16	+6	25	
4	Hyundai Horang-i	21	10	4	7	23	21	+2	24	
5	Yukong Elephants	21	7	5	9	28	26	+2	19	
6	Sangmu FC	21	6	7	8	23	30	−7	19	
7	Hanil Bank	21	3	10	8	18	30	−12	16	
8	Hallelujah FC	21	3	7	11	15	30	−15	13	

Source: RSSSF
(C) Champions

== Top scorers ==
Rank	Scorer	Club	Goals	Apps
1	(Thailand) Piyapong Pue-on	Lucky-Goldstar Hwangso	12	21
1	(South Korea) Kim Yong-se	Yukong Elephants	12	21
3	(South Korea) Lee Heung-sil	POSCO Atoms	10	21
4	(South Korea) Chung Hae-won	Daewoo Royals	7	17
4	(South Korea) Lee Sang-rae	Lucky-Goldstar Hwangso	7	21
6	(South Korea) Hong Seok-min	Sangmu FC	6	18
6	(South Korea) Park Sang-in	Hallelujah FC	6	21

== Awards ==
=== Main awards ===
Award	Winner	Club
Most Valuable Player	(South Korea) Han Moon-bae	Lucky-Goldstar Hwangso
Top goalscorer	(Thailand) Piyapong Pue-on	Lucky-Goldstar Hwangso
Top assist provider	(Thailand) Piyapong Pue-on	Lucky-Goldstar Hwangso
Rookie of the Year	(South Korea) Lee Heung-sil	POSCO Atoms
Manager of the Year	(South Korea) Park Se-hak	Lucky-Goldstar Hwangso
Best Goalkeeper	(South Korea) Kim Hyun-tae	Lucky-Goldstar Hwangso
Fighting Spirit Award	(South Korea) Kim Yong-se	Yukong Elephants

=== Best XI ===
Position	Winner	Club
Goalkeeper	(South Korea) Kim Hyun-tae	Lucky-Goldstar Hwangso
Defenders	(South Korea) Chang Woe-ryong	Daewoo Royals
Defenders	(South Korea) Han Moon-bae	Lucky-Goldstar Hwangso
Defenders	(South Korea) Choi Kang-hee	Hyundai Horang-i
Defenders	(South Korea) Kim Chul-soo	POSCO Atoms
Midfielders	(South Korea) Park Sang-in	Hallelujah FC
Midfielders	(South Korea) Lee Heung-sil	POSCO Atoms
Midfielders	(South Korea) Park Hang-seo	Lucky-Goldstar Hwangso
Forwards	(South Korea) Kim Yong-se	Yukong Elephants
Forwards	(Thailand) Piyapong Pue-on	Lucky-Goldstar Hwangso
Forwards	(South Korea) Kang Deuk-soo	Lucky-Goldstar Hwangso
