= Kim Seong-jae =

South Korean footballer and coach

Personal information
- Full name: Kim Seong-jae (김성재)
- Date of birth: September 17, 1976 (age 50)
- Place of birth: South Korea
- Height: 1.78 m (5 ft 10 in)
- Position: Midfielder

Youth career
- 1995–1998: Hanyang University

Senior career*
Years	Team	Apps	(Gls)
1999–2005	Anyang LG Cheetahs / FC Seoul	157	(11)
2006	Gyeongnam FC	14	(0)
2007–2009	Chunnam Dragons	38	(0)

International career
1996	South Korea U23		

Managerial career
- 2016: FC Seoul (caretaker manager)
- 2020: Yangju Citizen FC
- * Club domestic league appearances and goals

Kim Seong-jae (born September 17, 1976) is a South Korean retired football player and coach.

== Club career ==
He played for FC Seoul (formerly the Anyang LG Cheetahs), Gyeongnam FC, and Chunnam Dragons.

== Managerial career ==
In January 2010, he was appointed as a reserve team coach of FC Seoul. In January 2010, he was appointed as an assistant manager of FC Seoul.

== Honours ==
=== Player ===
Anyang LG Cheetahs

- K-League Winner (1): 2000
- K-League Runner-up (1): 2001

Sporting positions
Preceded by Choi Yoon-Yeol	FC Seoul captain 2003–2004	Succeeded by Lee Min-Sung
