= Park Dong-suk =

South Korean footballer (born 1984)

Park Dong-Suk
Personal information
- Date of birth: May 3, 1981 (age 45)
- Place of birth: Masan, Gyeongnam, South Korea
- Height: 1.90 m (6 ft 3 in)
- Position: Goalkeeper

Youth career
- Ajou University

Senior career*
Years	Team	Apps	(Gls)
2002–2009	Anyang LG Cheetahs / FC Seoul	55	(0)
2007–2008	→ Gwangju Sangmu (Military service)	14	(0)

International career^{‡}
1998–2000	South Korea U-20	13	(0)
2001–2004	South Korea U-23	1	(0)
- * Club domestic league appearances and goals as of 276 December 2008 ‡ National team caps and goals as of 5 October 2008

Park Dong-Suk (Korean: 박동석; born May 3, 1984) is a South Korean football player who recently played for FC Seoul, then known as Anyang LG Cheetahs and Gwangju Sangmu FC (military service).

== Club career statistics ==
As of end of 2008 season

Club performance			League		Cup		League Cup		Continental		Total	
Season	Club	League	Apps	Goals	Apps	Goals	Apps	Goals	Apps	Goals	Apps	Goals
South Korea			League		KFA Cup		League Cup		Asia		Total	
2002	Anyang LG Cheetahs	K-League	1	0			0	0			1	0
2003	Anyang LG Cheetahs	K-League	25	0	0	0	-		-		25	0
2004	FC Seoul	K-League	12	0	2	0	0	0	-		14	0
2005	FC Seoul	K-League	11	0	2	0	10	0	-		23	0
2006	FC Seoul	K-League	0	0	0	0	0	0	-		0	0
2007	Gwangju Sangmu Bulsajo	K-League	13	0	1	0	6	0	-		20	0
2008	Gwangju Sangmu Bulsajo	K-League	1	0	1	0	7	0	-		9	0
2009	FC Seoul	K-League										
Total
Total	FC Seoul		49	0	4	0	10	0	-		63	0
Total	Gwangju Sangmu Bulsajo		14	0	2	0	13	0	-		29	0
Career total			63	0	6	0	23	0	-		92	0
