= Kim Tae-jin =

South Korean footballer (born 1984)

Kim Tae-Jin
Personal information
- Full name: Kim Tae-Jin (김태진)
- Date of birth: October 29, 1984 (age 42)
- Place of birth: Donghae, Gangwon, South Korea
- Height: 1.78 m (5 ft 10 in)
- Position: Midfielder

Senior career*
Years	Team	Apps	(Gls)
2005–2007	FC Seoul	15	(0)
2008–2009	Incheon United	15	(0)
2011–	Gangneung City		
- * Club domestic league appearances and goals

Kim Tae-Jin (born October 29, 1984) is a South Korean former football player who play as a Midfielder and Playmaker.
