= Saitama City Cup =

Friendly association football tournament held in Saitama, Japan

The Saitama City Cup is an International friendly football tournament held in Saitama, Saitama Prefecture, Japan. It has been hosted by Urawa Red Diamonds annually since 2003 at Saitama Stadium 2002 until 2008 edition. 2009 event was also planned and announced but cancelled later due to 2009 flu pandemic. 2010 and 2011 edition were hosted by Omiya Ardija thus held at NACK5 Stadium Ōmiya. After absence in 2012, 2013 event will be hosted by Urawa again and Arsenal F.C. will be non-Japanese invitees, while previous edition in 2011 was competed by Omiya and Urawa, without non-Japanese invitees first time.

== Matches ==
=== 2022 international club friendly ===
16 November 2022
19:30 (UTC+9)

Urawa Red Diamonds (Japan)	4–2	(Germany) Eintracht Frankfurt
Junker 19', 27'; Scholz 50'; Matsuo 78'	Report	Alaoui 47'; Ferri 82'

Saitama Stadium 2002, Saitama
Attendance: 24,027

=== 2020 international club friendly ===
9 February 2020
13:00 (UTC+9)

Omiya Ardija (Japan)	0–1	(Uruguay) Nacional
		Vecino 52'

NACK5 Stadium Omiya, Saitama
Attendance: 7,442
Referee: Masaaki Iemoto (Japan)

=== 2017 international club friendly ===
12 February 2017
13:34 (UTC+9)

Urawa Red Diamonds (Japan)	1–1	(South Korea) FC Seoul
Nagasawa 83'	Report	Lee Sang-ho 38'

Urawa Komaba Stadium, Saitama
Attendance: 11,444
Referee: Minoru Tōjō (Japan)

=== 2013 international club friendly ===
26 July 2013
19:30 (UTC+9)

Urawa Red Diamonds (Japan)	1–2	(England) Arsenal F.C.
Abe 59'	Report	Podolski 49'; Akpom 82'

Saitama Stadium 2002, Saitama
Attendance: 40,769
Referee: Kenji Ogiya (Japan)

=== 2011 international club friendly ===
20 February 2011
13:34 (UTC+9)

Omiya Ardija (Japan)	3–0	(Japan) Urawa Red Diamonds
Kim 53'; Rafael 74'; Higashi 93'	Report; Report

NACK5 Stadium Ōmiya, Saitama
Attendance: 11,362
Referee: Yoshiro Imamura (Japan)

=== 2010 Surprise Cup ===
13 February 2010
13:30 (UTC+9)

Omiya Ardija (Japan)	5–0	(South Korea) Suwon Samsung Bluewings
Hashimoto 14' 68'; Rafael 20'; Ishihara 48' 54'	Report; Report

NACK5 Stadium Ōmiya, Saitama
Attendance: 6,053
Referee: Masaki Nabeshima (Japan)

=== 2008 Phonna Cup ===
31 July 2008
19:32 (UTC+9)

Urawa Red Diamonds (Japan)	2–4	(Germany) Bayern Munich
Umesaki 56'; Abe 80'	Report	Klose 15'; Podolski 20' 42' 62'

Saitama Stadium 2002, Saitama
Attendance: 27,292
Referee: Kazuhiko Matsumura (Japan)

=== 2007 Mohan Cup ===
17 July 2007
19:05 (UTC+9)

Urawa Red Diamonds (Japan)	2–2	(England) Manchester United
Uchidate 25'; Ono 78'	Report	Fletcher 47'; Ronaldo 51'

Saitama Stadium 2002, Saitama
Attendance: 58,716
Referee: Kazuhiko Matsumura (Japan)

=== 2006 Saitama City Cup ===
31 July 2006
19:04 (UTC+9)

Urawa Red Diamonds (Japan)	1–0	(Germany) Bayern Munich
Kurobe 88'	Report

Saitama Stadium 2002, Saitama
Attendance: 29,019
Referee: Tsutomu Anazawa (Japan)

=== 2005 Saitama City Cup ===
15 June 2005
19:04 (UTC+9)

Urawa Red Diamonds (Japan)	0–3	(Spain) Barcelona
	Report	Xavi 11'; Larsson 39' 77'

Saitama Stadium 2002, Saitama
Attendance: 57,143
Referee: Joji Kashihara (Japan)

=== 2004 Saitama City Cup ===
27 July 2004
19:05 (UTC+9)

Urawa Red Diamonds (Japan)	1–0	(Italy) Internazionale
Emerson 50'	Report

Saitama Stadium 2002, Saitama
Attendance: 57,633
Referee: Yuichi Nishimura (Japan)

=== 2003 Saitama City Cup ===
4 June 2003
19:10 (UTC+9)

Urawa Red Diamonds (Japan)	2–2	(Netherlands) Feyenoord
Tanaka 61'; Emerson 62'		Bombarda 17' 57'

Saitama Stadium 2002, Saitama
Attendance: 52,247
