= Kang Deuk-soo =

South Korean footballer and manager

Kang Deuk-Soo 강득수
Personal information
- Full name: Kang Deuk-Soo
- Date of birth: January 1, 1961 (age 65)
- Place of birth: South Korea
- Height: 1.73 m (5 ft 8 in)
- Position: Midfielder

Youth career
- 1980–1983: Yonsei University

Senior career*
Years	Team	Apps	(Gls)
1984–1989	Lucky-Goldstar Hwangso	137	(20)
1990–1991	Hyundai Horang-i	39	(2)
Total		176	(22)

International career
1980–1981	South Korea U-20		
1986	South Korea		

Managerial career
- 1993–1994: Semyeong Computer High School
- 1995–2003: Nunggok High School
Medal record
Representing South Korea
Men's football
Asian Games
Gold medal – first place	1986 Seoul	Team
- * Club domestic league appearances and goals

Kang Deuk-Soo (Korean: 강득수; born January 1, 1961) is a South Korean football player and manager.

== Club career statistics ==
All-Time Club Performance
Club	Season	League			League Cup			AFC Champions League			Total
Club	Season	Apps	Goals	Assts	Apps	Goals	Assts	Apps	Goals	Assts	Apps	Goals	Assts
Lucky-Goldstar Hwangso	1984	27	2	6	-	-	-	-	-	-	27	2	6
Lucky-Goldstar Hwangso	1985	21	5	3	-	-	-	-	-	-	21	5	3
Lucky-Goldstar Hwangso	1986	15	2	8	2	0	2	?	?	?
Lucky-Goldstar Hwangso	1987	31	4	3	-	-	-	?	?	?
Lucky-Goldstar Hwangso	1988	23	3	5	-	-	-	-	-	-	23	3	5
Lucky-Goldstar Hwangso	1989	20	4	7	-	-	-	-	-	-	20	4	7
Lucky-Goldstar Hwangso	Total	137	20	32	2	0	2
Hyundai Horang-i	1990	20	1	4	-	-	-	-	-	-	20	1	4
Hyundai Horang-i	1991	19	1	4	-	-	-	-	-	-	19	1	4
Hyundai Horang-i	Total	39	2	8	-	-	-	-	-	-	39	2	8
Career totals		176	2	8	-	-	-

== Honours ==
=== Club ===
Lucky-Goldstar Hwangso

- K League (1) : 1985
- Korean National Football Championship (1) : 1988

=== Individual ===
- K League Best XI : 1985
- K League Top Assists Award : 1986
