= 2004 FC Seoul season =

FC Seoul
2004 season
- Chairman: Huh Chang-soo
- Manager: Cho Kwang-rae
- K-League: 5th
- FA Cup: Round of 16
- League Cup: 12th
- Top goalscorer: League: Kim Eun-jung (8); All: Jung Jo-gook (13)
- Highest home attendance: 47,928 vs Busan (League, 3 April)
- Lowest home attendance: 2,452 vs Incheon (League, 6 October)
- Average home league attendance: 15,363
Home colours	Away colours

== Competitions ==
=== Overview ===
Competition	Starting round	Final position	Record							
Competition	Starting round	Final position	Pld	W	D	L	GF	GA	GD	Win %
K League	Matchday 1	Matchday 38					—			
FA Cup	Round of 32						—			
League Cup	Group stage						—			
Total			0	0	0	0	0	0	+0	—

Last updated: 31 December 2004
Source: Fixtures and Results at FC Seoul Official Website

== Match reports and match highlights ==
Fixtures and Results at FC Seoul Official Website (in English)

== Season statistics ==
=== K League records ===
Season	Teams	Final Position	League Position	Pld	W	D	L	GF	GA	GD	Pts	Manager
2004	13	5th	4th	24	7	12	5	20	17	+3	33	(South Korea) Cho Kwang-Rae

- 2004 season's league position was decided by aggregate points,
  because this season had first stage and second stage.

=== All competitions records ===
Seasoan	Teams	K League	Championship	League Cup	FA Cup	AFC Champions League	Manager
2004	13	5th	Did not qualify	12th	Round of 16	Did not qualify	(South Korea) Cho Kwang-Rae

=== Attendance records ===
Season	Season Total Att.	K League Season Total Att.	Regular season Average Att.	League Cup Average Att.	FA Cup Total / Average Att.	ACL Total / Average Att.	Friendly Match Att.	Att. Ranking	Notes
2004	223,529	223,529	15,363	6,529	No home match	N/A	N/A		

- Season total attendance is K League Regular Season, League Cup, FA Cup, AFC Champions League in the aggregate and friendly match attendance is not included.
- K League season total attendance is K League Regular Season and League Cup in the aggregate.

== Squad statistics ==
=== Goals ===
Pos	K League	League Cup	FA Cup	AFC Champions League	Total	Notes
1	(South Korea) Kim Eun-Jung (8)	(South Korea) Jung Jo-Gook (6)	(South Korea) Jung Jo-Gook (5) (South Korea) Wang Jung-Hyun (5)	Did not qualify	(South Korea) Jung Jo-Gook (13)	
2	(South Korea) Kim Dong-Jin (3)	(Brazil) Fumagalli (2)	N/A	Did not qualify	(South Korea) Kim Eun-Jung (8)	
3	(South Korea) Jung Jo-Gook (2)	(South Korea) Wang Jung-Hyun (2)	(South Korea) Lee Ji-Nam (2)	Did not qualify	(South Korea) Wang Jung-Hyun (7)	
4	(South Korea) Lee Won-Shik (1)	(Brazil) Santana (1)	No scorer	Did not qualify	(South Korea) Kim Dong-Jin (3)	
5	(Brazil) Santana (1)	No scorer	No scorer	Did not qualify	(South Korea) Lee Ji-Nam (2)	

=== Assists ===
Pos	K League	League Cup	Total	Notes
1	(South Korea) Kim Dong-Jin (2)	(South Korea) Kim Seung-Yong (2)	(South Korea) Kim Seung-Yong (2)	
2	(South Korea) Choi Won-Kwon (2)	(South Korea) Lee Won-Shik (1)	(South Korea) Kim Dong-Jin (2)	
3	(South Korea) Park Jung-Suk (2)	(South Korea) Han Sang-Gu (1)	(South Korea) Choi Won-Kwon (2)	
4	(South Korea) Kim Eun-Jung (2)	(South Korea) Jung Jo-Gook (1)	(South Korea) Park Jung-Suk (2)	
5	(South Korea) Kim Seong-Jae (1)	No assistor	(South Korea) Kim Eun-Jung (2)	

== Coaching staff ==
Position	Name	Period	Notes
Manager	(South Korea) Cho Kwang-Rae		
Assistant manager	(Brazil) Ivo		
First-team coach	(South Korea) Lee Young-jin		
Player Coach	(Tajikistan) (South Korea) Shin Eui-Son		7 caps in K-League
Reserve Team Manager	(South Korea) Kim Kwui-Hwa		
Reserve Team Coach	(South Korea) Son Hyun-Jun		
Goalkeeping coach	(Brazil) Antonio	5 January 2004 – 4 March 2004	3 months contract
Goalkeeping coach	(Brazil) Leandro		
Fitness coach	(Brazil) Wanderley		
Chief scout	(South Korea) Kang Chun-Ho		

== Players ==
=== Team squad ===
All players registered for the 2004 season are listed.

Note: Flags indicate national team as defined under FIFA eligibility rules; some limited exceptions apply. Players may hold more than one non-FIFA nationality.

No.	Pos.	Nation	Player
1	GK	KOR	Weon Jong-Teok
2	MF	BRA	Valenzing
4	DF	KOR	Kim Dong-Jin
5	DF	BRA	Souza
6	DF	KOR	Park Jung-Suk
7	MF	KOR	Lee Eul-Yong (Out)
8	MF	KOR	Kim Seong-Jae (captain)
9	FW	BRA	Renaldo (Out)
9	FW	BRA	Santana (In)
11	FW	KOR	Lee Won-Shik
13	MF	KOR	Choi Won-Kwon
14	DF	KOR	Park Yong-Ho (Conscripted)
15	MF	KOR	Han Tae-You
16	FW	KOR	Lee Jun-Young
17	DF	KOR	Kim Chi-Gon
18	FW	KOR	Jung Jo-Gook
19	DF	KOR	Lee Jung-Youl
20	DF	KOR	Lee Jung-Soo (Out)
21	DF	KOR	Park Yo-Seb (Conscripted)
22	FW	KOR	Kim Eun-Jung
23	MF	BRA	Fumagalli (Out)
24	DF	KOR	Han Sang-Gu
25	DF	KOR	Jung Jae-Yoon
26	DF	KOR	Choi Jae-Soo

No.	Pos.	Nation	Player
28	MF	KOR	Wang Jung-Hyun
29	FW	KOR	Kim Seung-Yong
30	MF	KOR	Ku Kyung-Hyen
31	GK	KOR	Kim Tae-Soo
32	FW	KOR	Han Dong-Won
33	MF	KOR	Ahn Sang-Hyun
34	DF	KOR	Jung Sung-Ho
35	MF	KOR	Song Jin-Hyung
36	MF	KOR	Koh Myong-Jin
37	MF	KOR	Kim Dong-Suk
38	DF	KOR	Lee Kwang-Hee
39	MF	KOR	Lee Ik-Sung
40	MF	KOR	Bae Hae-Min
41	GK	KOR	Park Dong-Suk
42	MF	KOR	Lee Ji-Nam
43	DF	KOR	Yoon Hong-Chang (Conscripted)
44	GK	KOR	Shin Eui-Son
45	DF	KOR	Jung Chang-Kyun
46	FW	KOR	Lee Chung-Yong
47	MF	KOR	Go Yo-Han
48	MF	BRA	Rinaldo
49	MF	KOR	Cho Sung-Yong
55	MF	KOR	Park Man-Choon
80	FW	KOR	Dragan Stojisavljević (Out)

=== Out on loan & military service ===
Note: Flags indicate national team as defined under FIFA eligibility rules; some limited exceptions apply. Players may hold more than one non-FIFA nationality.

No.	Pos.	Nation	Player
—	GK	KOR	Back Min-chul (to (South Korea) Gwangju Sangmu until December 2004 / Discharged)
—	FW	KOR	Kim Byung-chae (to (South Korea) Gwangju Sangmu until December 2004 / Discharged)

No.	Pos.	Nation	Player
—	DF	KOR	Park Sung-ho (to Police FC until November 2005)
—	DF	KOR	Shin Jae-pil (to (South Korea) Police FC until November 2005)
—	DF	KOR	Lee Jun-ki (to Police FC until November 2005)
—	MF	KOR	Park Yun-hwa (to Gwangju Sangmu until November 2005)
—	FW	KOR	Han Jung-hwa (to Gwangju Sangmu until November 2005)
—	FW	KOR	Park Jung-hwan (to Gwangju Sangmu until November 2005)

- In: Transferred from other teams in the middle of season.
- Out: Transferred to other teams in the middle of season.
- Discharged: Transferred from Gwangju Sangmu and Police FC for military service after end of season. (Not registered in 2004 season.)
- Conscripted: Transferred to Gwangju Sangmu and Police FC for military service after end of season.

== Tactics ==
=== Starting eleven and formation ===
This section shows the most used players for each position considering a 3-4-3 formation.

No.	Pos.	Nat.	Name	MS	Notes
1	GK	(South Korea)	Weon Jong-Teok		
6	DF	(South Korea)	Park Jung-Suk		
5	DF	(Brazil)	Souza		
19	DF	(South Korea)	Lee Jung-Youl		
13	MF	(South Korea)	Choi Won-Kwon		
48	MF	(Brazil)	Ricardo		
21	MF	(South Korea)	Park Yo-Seb		
15	MF	(South Korea)	Han Tae-You		
4	MF	(South Korea)	Kim Dong-Jin		
18	FW	(South Korea)	Jung Jo-Gook		
22	FW	(South Korea)	Kim Eun-Jung		

Source: Squad stats and Start formations.
Only competitive matches.
Using the most used start formation.
Ordered by position on pitch (from back right to front left).

=== Substitutes ===
No.	Pos.	Nat.	Name	MS	Notes
41	GK	(South Korea)	Park Dong-Suk		
15	DF	(South Korea)	Kim Chi-Gon		
8	MF	(South Korea)	Kim Seong-Jae		
28	MF	(South Korea)	Wang Jung-Hyun		
11	FW	(South Korea)	Lee Won-Shik		
16	FW	(South Korea)	Lee Jun-Young		

Source: Squad stats and Start formations.
Only competitive matches.
Using the most used start formation.
Ordered by position on pitch (from back right to front left).

== See also ==
- FC Seoul
