= Kim Kyung-choon =

South Korean footballer

Kim Kyung-Choon
Personal information
- Full name: Kim Kyung-Choon (김경춘)
- Date of birth: January 27, 1984 (age 42)
- Place of birth: South Korea
- Height: 1.80 m (5 ft 11 in)
- Position: Midfielder

Team information
- Current team: Busan Transportation Corporation
- Number: 9

Youth career
- 2002–2005: Pukyong National University

Senior career*
Years	Team	Apps	(Gls)
2006	Ulsan Hyundai Mipo	20	(10)
2007–2008	Korean Police FC (army)		
2009	Suwon City FC	11	(2)
2010	Gangwon FC	2	(0)
2010–2015	Busan Transportation Corporation	126	(10)
- * Club domestic league appearances and goals as of 2 March 2011

- Kim Kyung-choon
- Hangul: 김경춘
- Hanja: 金敬春
- RR: Gim Gyeongchun
- MR: Kim Kyŏngch'un

Kim Kyung-Choon (Korean: 김경춘; Hanja: 金敬春, born 27 January 1984) is a South Korean football player.

== Club career ==
=== National League ===
He started his career at Korea National League side Ulsan Hyundai Mipo. One season later, he joined Korean Police FC for military duty for two years. He came back to Korea National League side Suwon City FC from 2009 season.

=== Gangwon FC ===
On 17 November 2009, he parted 2010 K-League draft, but he wasn't called any clubs in 2010 K-League draft. Kim joined Gangwon FC lately in the preseason. His first K-League match was against Pohang Steelers in Pohang, which Gangwon lost 0-4 in an away game on 20 March 2010.

=== Back to National League ===
In July 2010, he moved back to Korea National League side Busan Transportation Corporation.

=== Statistics ===
As of 2 March 2011

Club performance			League		Cup		League Cup		Total	
Season	Club	League	Apps	Goals	Apps	Goals	Apps	Goals	Apps	Goals
South Korea			League		KFA Cup		League Cup		Total	
2006	Ulsan Mipo Dockyard	Korea National League	20	10	2	0	-		22	10
2007	National Police Agency FC	R-League			-		-			
2008	National Police Agency FC	R-League			-		-			
2009	Suwon City FC	Korea National League	11	2	0	0	-		11	2
2010	Gangwon FC	K-League	2	0	1	0	0	0	3	0
2010	Busan Transportation Corporation	Korea National League	14	2	0	0	-		14	2
2011	Busan Transportation Corporation	Korea National League					-			
Total	South Korea		47	14	3	0	0	0	50	14
Career total			47	14	3	0	0	0	50	14

Note: appearances and goals include championship playoffs.
