= Song Dong-jin =

South Korean footballer (born 1984)

Song Dong-Jin
Personal information
- Full name: Song Dong-Jin
- Date of birth: May 12, 1984 (age 42)
- Place of birth: Pohang, South Korea
- Height: 1.84 m (6 ft 0 in)
- Position: Goalkeeper

Youth career
- 2000–2002: Pohang Steelers Youth (U-18)

Senior career*
Years	Team	Apps	(Gls)
2003–2012	Pohang Steelers	1	(0)
2006–2007	→ National Police Agency (army)		
- * Club domestic league appearances and goals as of 4 December 2012

Song Dong-Jin (Korean: 송동진, born May 12, 1984) is a South Korea football player who last played for Pohang Steelers.

== Club career ==
Song began his football career with Pohang Steelers's youth team under-12 sides. From 2006 to 2007 season, Song served his two year for military duty at National Police Agency FC. He played reserve league of K-League, so-called R-League mostly. Song made his debut in competitive match for the Pohang on 19 December 2009, 2009 FIFA Club World Cup match for third-place result a 4–3 on penalty win. In this match, he saved two kicker on penalty shootout.

== Club career statistics ==
Club performance			League		Cup		League Cup		Continental		Total	
Season	Club	League	Apps	Goals	Apps	Goals	Apps	Goals	Apps	Goals	Apps	Goals
South Korea			League		KFA Cup		League Cup		Asia		Total	
2003	Pohang Steelers	K-League	0	0	0	0	–		–		0	0
2004	Pohang Steelers	K-League	0	0	0	0	0	0	–		0	0
2005	Pohang Steelers	K-League	0	0	0	0	0	0	–		0	0
2006	National Police Agency	R-League			–		–		–			
2007	National Police Agency	R-League			–		–		–			
2008	Pohang Steelers	K-League	0	0	0	0	0	0	0	0	0	0
2009	Pohang Steelers	K-League	0	0	0	0	0	0	1	0	1	0
2010	Pohang Steelers	K-League	1	0	0	0	0	0	0	0	1	0
2011	Pohang Steelers	K-League	0	0	0	0	0	0	-		0	0
2012	Pohang Steelers	K-League	0	0	0	0	-		-		0	0
Total	South Korea		1	0	0	0	0	0	1	0	2	0
Career total			1	0	0	0	0	0	1	0	2	0
