= FC Seoul Reserves and Academy =

Reserve team of FC Seoul

FC Seoul Reserves are the reserve team of FC Seoul. Reserve team is member of the R League (Reserve League).

FC Seoul Academy is the youth system of FC Seoul. The academy consists of U-18 Team, U-15 Team, U-12 Team and Future of FC Seoul. The Future of Seoul U-12, U-15, and U-18 are considered to be a part of the academy, while the rest are for young players playing as a hobby. U-18 Team is a member of the K League Junior (Youth League).

== FC Seoul Reserves ==
=== History ===
FC Seoul Reserves was built in 1990 for first R League. But R League existed just for one year.

In 2000, R League relaunched, and FC Seoul Reserves was rebuilt for competition. There are many players who played for reserves including Lee Chung-Yong, Song Jin-Hyung, Ko Myong-Jin, Ahn Sang-Hyun.

=== Coaching staff ===
| Position | Name | Notes |
|---|---|---|
| Reserve Team Coach | (South Korea) | |
| Reserve Team Goalkeeping Coach | (South Korea) | |

=== Honours ===
- R League
  - (gold) Winners (3): 2000, 2002, 2004
  - (silver) Runners-up (2): 2001, 2005

=== Statistics ===
==== R League - Season by Season Records ====
| Season | Teams | Final Position | Group Teams | Group Position | Pld | W | D | L | GF | GA | GD | Pts | Knockout Stage | Manager |
|---|---|---|---|---|---|---|---|---|---|---|---|---|---|---|
| 1990 | 5 | 4th | N/A | N/A | 12 | 4 | 3 | 5 | 18 | 20 | -2 | 11 | N/A | (South Korea) Jung Hae-Seong |
| 2000 | 9 | Champions | 5 | Central League; 1st | 16 | 8 | 4 | 4 | 32 | 22 | +10 | 28 | Champions | (South Korea) Shin Jae-Heum |
| 2001 | 10 | Runners-up | 5 | Central League; 2nd | 16 | 9 | 1 | 6 | 31 | 29 | +2 | 28 | Runners-up | (South Korea) Shin Jae-Heum |
| 2002 | 11 | Champions | 6 | Central League; 2nd | 20 | 11 | 6 | 3 | 44 | 22 | +22 | 44 | Champions | (South Korea) Shin Jae-Heum |
| 2003 | 10 | Central League; Runners-up | 5 | Central League; 2nd | 16 | 9 | 4 | 3 | 30 | 17 | +13 | 31 | Not held | (South Korea) Kim Kwui-Hwa |
| 2004 | 11 | Champions | 6 | Central League; 2nd | 15 | 6 | 6 | 3 | 20 | 19 | +1 | 24 | Champions | (South Korea) Kim Kwui-Hwa |
| 2005 | 10 | Runners-up | 6 | Central League; 1st | 20 | 12 | 4 | 4 | 36 | 23 | +13 | 40 | Runners-up | (South Korea) Choi Gi-Bong |
| 2006 | 12 | 3rd | 4 | Group A 1st | 18 | 8 | 3 | 7 | 31 | 27 | +4 | 27 | Semi-final | (South Korea) Kim Sung-Nam |
| 2007 | 13 | Group A 5th | 5 | Group A 5th | 16 | 4 | 6 | 6 | 17 | 20 | -3 | 18 | Did not qualify | (South Korea) Kim Sung-Nam |
| 2008 | 15 | Group A 5th | 7 | Group A 5th | 18 | 6 | 4 | 8 | 30 | 37 | -7 | 22 | Did not qualify | (South Korea) Kim Sung-Nam |
| 2009 | 14 | Group A 5th | 5 | Group A 5th | 12 | 1 | 4 | 7 | 11 | 26 | -15 | 7 | Did not qualify | (South Korea) Kim Sung-Nam |
| 2010 | 16 | Group A Champions | 8 | Group A 1st | 14 | 10 | 3 | 1 | 32 | 10 | +22 | 33 | Not held | (South Korea) Choi Jin-Han |
| 2011 | 16 | Group A 5th | 8 | Group A 5th | 21 | 8 | 4 | 9 | 33 | 29 | +4 | 28 | Not held | (South Korea) Kim Sung-Nam |
| 2012 | 11 | Group A 4th | 6 | Group A 4th | 15 | 3 | 3 | 9 | 18 | 32 | -14 | 12 | Not held | (South Korea) Kim Sung-Nam (–July 2012) |

==== R League - Knockout Stage Records ====
| Season | Teams | Position | Pld | W | D | L | GF | GA | GD | PSO | Manager |
|---|---|---|---|---|---|---|---|---|---|---|---|
| 2000 | 4 | Winners | 3 | 1 | 1 | 1 | 6 | 5 | +1 | 4-3 W (Final) | (South Korea) Shin Jae-Heum |
| 2001 | 4 | Runners-up | 3 | 1 | 0 | 2 | 4 | 5 | -1 | N/A | (South Korea) Shin Jae-Heum |
| 2002 | 4 | Winners | 3 | 2 | 1 | 0 | 2 | 0 | +2 | N/A | (South Korea) Shin Jae-Heum |
| 2004 | 4 | Winners | 3 | 2 | 1 | 0 | 5 | 2 | +3 | N/A | (South Korea) Kim Kwui-Hwa |
| 2005 | 4 | Runners-up | 3 | 0 | 2 | 1 | 4 | 5 | -1 | 3-1 W (Semi-finals) | (South Korea) Choi Gi-Bong |
| 2006 | 4 | 3rd (Semi-finals) | 1 | 0 | 0 | 1 | 0 | 1 | -1 | N/A | (South Korea) Kim Sung-Nam |

=== Award winners ===
- R League MVP Award Winners

| # | Year | Player | Position | Notes |
|---|---|---|---|---|
| 1 | 2002 | (South Korea) Park Dong-Suk | Goalkeeper | |
| 2 | 2004 | (South Korea) Han Dong-Won | Forward | |

- R League Top Scorer Award Winners

| # | Year | Player | Position | Goals | Matches | Goals per Match | Notes |
|---|---|---|---|---|---|---|---|
| 1 | 1990 | (South Korea) Kim Dong-Hae | Midfielder | 7 | ? | | |
| 2 | 2000 | (South Korea) Wang Jung-Hyun | Forward | 8 | 8 | 1.00 | |
| 3 | 2005 | (South Korea) Han Dong-Won | Forward | 10 | 20 | 0.50 | |

== FC Seoul Academy ==
=== History ===
FC Seoul didn't have a practical youth system by 2006. In 2007, FC Seoul affiliated with Dongbuk High School FC as U-18 team.

In 2012 December, FC Seoul established U-18 team and U-15 team at Osan Schools.

In 2014 December, FC Seoul established U-12 Team. FC Seoul constructed youth system.

=== Coaching staff ===
| Position | Name | Notes |
|---|---|---|
| U-18 Team Manager | (South Korea) Cha Du-ri | |
| U-18 Team Coach | (South Korea) Kim Jin-kyu | |
| U-18 Team Goalkeeping Coach | (South Korea) Weon Jong-teok | |
| U-18 Team Fitness Coach | (South Korea) Hwang Ji-hwan | |
| U-15 Team Manager | (South Korea) Kim Young-jin | |
| U-15 Team Coach | (South Korea) Park Hyuk-soon | |
| U-15 Team Goalkeeping Coach | (South Korea) Son Il-pyo | |
| U-15 Team Fitness Coach | (South Korea) Jung Hoon-gi | |
| U-12 Team Manager | (South Korea) Kim Byung-chae | |
| U-12 Team Coach | (South Korea) Seo Ki-man | |
| U-12 Team Goalkeeping Coach | (South Korea) Lee Ji-hun | |

=== FC Seoul U-18 Team ===
FC Seoul U-18 Team is Osan High School FC in Seoul. Osan High School FC is founded in December 2012. From 2007 to 2012, FC Seoul U-18 Team was Dongbuk High School FC.

==== Honours ====
- K League Junior
  - Winners (2) : 2009, 2020 Group A
- Korea High School Football Championship (Spring)
  - Winners (1) : 2019

==== Statistics ====
- 2008–2012 seasons were Dongbuk High School FC period.

===== K League Junior - Season by Season Records =====
| Season | Teams | Final Position | Group Teams | Group Position | Pld | W | D | L | GF | GA | GD | Pts | Knockout Stage | Manager |
|---|---|---|---|---|---|---|---|---|---|---|---|---|---|---|
| 2008 | 8 | 3rd | 4 | Group A 2nd | 12 | 9 | 1 | 2 | 32 | 12 | +20 | 28 | 3rd | (South Korea) Choi Jin-Han |
| 2009 | 13 | Champions | 6 | Group A 1st | 15 | 12 | 2 | 1 | 36 | 10 | +26 | 38 | Champions | (South Korea) Choi Jin-Han |
| 2010 | 14 | 3rd | 7 | Group A 2nd | 12 | 6 | 1 | 5 | 21 | 17 | +4 | 19 | 3rd | (South Korea) Lee Young-Ik |
| 2011 | 14 | 11th | 7 | Group A 5th | 18 | 5 | 7 | 6 | 25 | 24 | +1 | 22 | 11th | (South Korea) Lee Young-Ik |
| 2012 | 16 | Group A 5th | 7 | Group A 5th | 22 | 10 | 6 | 6 | 42 | 30 | +12 | 36 | Not held | (South Korea) Lee Young-Ik |
| 2013 | 17 | 9th | Single round robin system | | 16 | 7 | 2 | 7 | 29 | 21 | +8 | 23 | Not held | (Spain) Kike Linero |

===== K League Junior - Knockout Stage Records =====
| Season | Teams | Position | Pld | W | D | L | GF | GA | GD | PSO | Manager |
|---|---|---|---|---|---|---|---|---|---|---|---|
| 2008 | 4 | 3rd | 1 | 0 | 1 | 1 | 0 | 1 | -1 | N/A | (South Korea) Choi Jin-Han |
| 2009 | 2 | Champions | 1 | 0 | 1 | 0 | 2 | 2 | 0 | 5-3 W (Final) | (South Korea) Choi Jin-Han |
| 2010 | 2 | 3rd | 1 | 1 | 0 | 0 | 1 | 0 | +1 | N/A | (South Korea) Lee Young-Ik |
| 2011 | 2 | 11th | 1 | 1 | 0 | 0 | 3 | 2 | +1 | N/A | (South Korea) Lee Young-Ik |

==== Rookie Draft ====
| Year | Name | Name | Name | Name | Sum | Note |
|---|---|---|---|---|---|---|
| 2008 | (South Korea) Moon Ki-Han | (South Korea) Kim Hyun-Sung (Univ.) | | | 2 | |
| 2009 | (South Korea) Lee, Yoon Ho (Univ.) | (South Korea) Kim Sang-Pil (Univ.) | | | 2 | (South Korea) Kim Hyun-Sung (After Univ. / 2008 Draft) |
| 2010 | (South Korea) Jung Seung-Yong | (South Korea) Song Seung-Ju | (South Korea) Lee Kwang-Jin | (South Korea) Cho Min-Woo (Univ.) | 4 | (South Korea) Lee, Yoon Ho (After Univ. / 2009 Draft) |
| 2011 | (South Korea) Yoo Dong-Won (Univ.) | (South Korea) Jung Dong-Chul (Univ.) | (South Korea) Yoo Jae-Geun (Univ.) | (South Korea) Jun Byeong-Soo (Univ.) | 4 | |
| 2012 | (South Korea) Kim Won-Sik | (South Korea) Jang Hyeon-U | (South Korea) Ju Hyeong-Jun (Univ.) | (South Korea) Baek Cheol-Seung (Univ.) | 7 | (South Korea) Cho Min-Woo (After Univ. / 2010 Draft) |
| 2012 | (South Korea) Kim Hak-Seung (Univ.) | (South Korea) Choi Myeong-Hun (Univ.) | (South Korea) Park Jun-Gyeong (Univ.) | | 7 | (South Korea) Cho Min-Woo (After Univ. / 2010 Draft) |
| 2013 | (South Korea) Kim Eun-Do | (South Korea) Park Seung-Yeoul | (South Korea) Shin Hak-Young | (South Korea) Choi Bong-Won | 7 | (South Korea) Kim Sang-Pil (After Univ. / 2009 Draft) |
| 2013 | (South Korea) Hwang Shin-Young | (South Korea) Oh Jun-Hyeok (Univ.) | (South Korea) Cho Won-Tae (Univ.) | | 7 | (South Korea) Kim Sang-Pil (After Univ. / 2009 Draft) |
| 2014 | (South Korea) Hwang Hyun-soo | (South Korea) Yoon Hyeon-Oh | (South Korea) Kim Chol-Ho | (South Korea) Shim Je-Hyeok | 6 | (South Korea) Jung Dong-Cheol (South Korea) Choi Myung-Hun (After Univ. / 2011 Draft) |
| 2014 | (South Korea) Park Min-Kyu (Univ.) | (South Korea) Park Jun-Young (Univ.) | | | 6 | (South Korea) Jung Dong-Cheol (South Korea) Choi Myung-Hun (After Univ. / 2011 Draft) |

- (Univ.) means player who go to university then back to FC Seoul
- (After Univ.) means player who is joined FC Seoul after entering university

==== Notable graduate ====
- (South Korea) Moon Ki-Han, (South Korea) Kim Hyun-Sung, (South Korea) Jung Seung-Yong, (South Korea) Kim Won-Sik, (South Korea) Shim Je-hyeok

=== FC Seoul U-15 Team ===
FC Seoul U-15 Team is Osan Middle School FC in Seoul. Osan Middle School FC is founded in December 2012.

=== FC Seoul U-12 Team ===
FC Seoul U-12 Team founded in December 2014. FC Seoul U-12 Team scout outstanding players of Future of FC Seoul.

=== Future of FC Seoul ===
FC Seoul ran a soccer camp for hobby in 1990s and 2000s, then known as LG Cheetahs Soccer Camp and Little FC Seoul.

In October 2012, Renamed Future of FC Seoul, FC Seoul have been running the Future of FC Seoul (FOS) Program the Youth Football Academy to find promising young players for the future and also planning and involving in Social Contribution Events to enhance the football infrastructure and environment.

Outstanding players in Future of FC Seoul can transfer to U-12 team.

==== Notable graduate ====
- (South Korea) Ju Se-jong, (South Korea) Ahn Hyeon-beom

== See also ==
- FC Seoul
- R League
