= 1991–1995 LG Cheetahs seasons =

South Korean football club seasons

LG Cheetahs was a South Korean professional football club based in Seoul.

== Seasons Statistics ==
=== All competitions records ===
※ 1993 season had PSO and blows results are that PSO results are counted by drawn.
※ A: Adidas Cup

Season	Teams	K League	Pld	W	D	L	GF	GA	GD	Pts	League Cup	FA Cup	Super Cup	Asian Club Championship	Manager
1991	6	6th	40	9	15	16	44	53	–9	33				Did not qualify	(South Korea) Ko Jae-wook
1992	6	4th	30	8	13	9	30	35	–5	29	Runners-up (A)			Did not enter	(South Korea) Ko Jae-wook
1993	6	Runners-up	30	18; 10	0; 11	12; 9	28	29	–1	59	4th (A)			Did not qualify	(South Korea) Ko Jae-wook
1994	7	5th	30	12	7	11	53	50	+3	43	Runners-up (A)			Did not qualify	(South Korea) Cho Young-jeung
1995	8	8th	28	5	10	13	29	43	–14	25	6th (A)			Did not qualify	(South Korea) Cho Young-jeung

== Kits ==
=== First Kit ===
1991–1993	1994	1995

=== Second Kit ===
1991	1992	1993	1994	1995

== Transfers ==
=== 1991 season ===
==== In ====
#	Name	POS	Moving from	Mode	Window	Period	Fee	Notes
1	(South Korea) Choi Tae-Jin	DF	(South Korea) Daewoo Royals		Winter			

===== Rookie Draft =====
#	Name	POS	Moving from	Mode	Notes
1	(South Korea) Lee In-Jae	FW	(South Korea) Chung-Ang University	Franchise	
2	(South Korea) Lee Young-Ik	DF	(South Korea) Korea University	Regular (1st)	
3	(South Korea) Kim Dong-Hae	MF	(South Korea) Hanyang University	Regular (2nd)	
4	(South Korea) Kim Seok-Hwan	DF	(South Korea) Yeungnam University	Regular (3rd)	
5	(South Korea) Oh Jae-Il	FW	(South Korea) Sungkyunkwan University	Regular (4th)	
6	(South Korea) Cha Yeon-Ju	FW	(South Korea) Andong National University	Regular (5th)	

==== Out ====
#	Name	POS	Moving from	Mode	Window	Period	Fee	Notes
1	(South Korea) Lee Boo-Yeol	DF	Unknown	Contract ended	Winter	N/A		

===== Loan & Military service =====
#	Name	POS	Moving to	Window	Period	Fee	Notes
1	(South Korea)		(South Korea)	Winter			

=== 1992 season ===
==== In ====
#	Name	POS	Moving from	Mode	Window	Period	Fee	Notes
1	(South Korea) Choi Tae-Jin	DF	(South Korea) Daewoo Royals		Winter			

===== Rookie Draft =====
#	Name	POS	Moving from	Mode	Notes
1	(South Korea) Lee In-Jae	FW	(South Korea) Chung-Ang University	Franchise	
2	(South Korea) Lee Young-Ik	DF	(South Korea) Korea University	Regular (1st)	
3	(South Korea) Kim Dong-Hae	MF	(South Korea) Hanyang University	Regular (2nd)	
4	(South Korea) Kim Seok-Hwan	DF	(South Korea) Yeungnam University	Regular (3rd)	
5	(South Korea) Oh Jae-Il	FW	(South Korea) Sungkyunkwan University	Regular (4th)	
6	(South Korea) Cha Yeon-Ju	FW	(South Korea) Andong National University	Regular (5th)	

==== Out ====
#	Name	POS	Moving from	Mode	Window	Period	Fee	Notes
1	(South Korea) Lee Boo-Yeol	DF	Unknown	Contract ended	Winter	N/A		

===== Loan & Military service =====
#	Name	POS	Moving to	Window	Period	Fee	Notes
1	(South Korea)		(South Korea)	Winter			

=== 1993 season ===
==== In ====
#	Name	POS	Moving from	Mode	Window	Period	Fee	Notes
1	(South Korea) Choi Tae-Jin	DF	(South Korea) Daewoo Royals		Winter			

===== Rookie Draft =====
#	Name	POS	Moving from	Mode	Notes
1	(South Korea) Lee In-Jae	FW	(South Korea) Chung-Ang University	Franchise	
2	(South Korea) Lee Young-Ik	DF	(South Korea) Korea University	Regular (1st)	
3	(South Korea) Kim Dong-Hae	MF	(South Korea) Hanyang University	Regular (2nd)	
4	(South Korea) Kim Seok-Hwan	DF	(South Korea) Yeungnam University	Regular (3rd)	
5	(South Korea) Oh Jae-Il	FW	(South Korea) Sungkyunkwan University	Regular (4th)	
6	(South Korea) Cha Yeon-Ju	FW	(South Korea) Andong National University	Regular (5th)	

==== Out ====
#	Name	POS	Moving from	Mode	Window	Period	Fee	Notes
1	(South Korea) Lee Boo-Yeol	DF	Unknown	Contract ended	Winter	N/A		

===== Loan & Military service =====
#	Name	POS	Moving to	Window	Period	Fee	Notes
1	(South Korea)		(South Korea)	Winter			

=== 1994 season ===
==== In ====
#	Name	POS	Moving from	Mode	Window	Period	Fee	Notes
1	(South Korea) Choi Tae-Jin	DF	(South Korea) Daewoo Royals		Winter			

===== Rookie Draft =====
#	Name	POS	Moving from	Mode	Notes
1	(South Korea) Park Chul	DF	(South Korea) Daegu University	Regular (1st)	
2	(South Korea) Choi Yong-Soo	FW	(South Korea) Yonsei University	Regular (2nd)	

==== Out ====
#	Name	POS	Moving from	Mode	Window	Period	Fee	Notes
1	(South Korea) Lee Boo-Yeol	DF	Unknown	Contract ended	Winter	N/A		

===== Loan & Military service =====
#	Name	POS	Moving to	Window	Period	Fee	Notes
1	(South Korea)		(South Korea)	Winter			

==== In ====
#	Name	POS	Moving from	Mode	Window	Period	Fee	Notes
1	(South Korea) Choi Tae-Jin	DF	(South Korea) Daewoo Royals		Winter			

===== Rookie Draft =====
#	Name	POS	Moving from	Mode	Notes
1	(South Korea) Lee In-Jae	FW	(South Korea) Chung-Ang University	Franchise	
2	(South Korea) Lee Young-Ik	DF	(South Korea) Korea University	Regular (1st)	
3	(South Korea) Kim Dong-Hae	MF	(South Korea) Hanyang University	Regular (2nd)	
4	(South Korea) Kim Seok-Hwan	DF	(South Korea) Yeungnam University	Regular (3rd)	
5	(South Korea) Oh Jae-Il	FW	(South Korea) Sungkyunkwan University	Regular (4th)	
6	(South Korea) Cha Yeon-Ju	FW	(South Korea) Andong National University	Regular (5th)	

==== Out ====
#	Name	POS	Moving from	Mode	Window	Period	Fee	Notes
1	(South Korea) Lee Boo-Yeol	DF	Unknown	Contract ended	Winter	N/A		

===== Loan & Military service =====
#	Name	POS	Moving to	Window	Period	Fee	Notes
1	(South Korea)		(South Korea)	Winter			

== See also ==
- FC Seoul
