= 1996–2003 Anyang LG Cheetahs seasons =

South Korean football club seasons

Anyang LG Cheetahs was a South Korean professional football club based in Seoul.

== Seasons statistics ==
=== All competitions records ===
※ K-League Championship results are not counted.
※ 1998, 1999, 2000 seasons had PSO and blows results are that PSO results are counted by drawn.
※ A: Adidas Cup, P: Prospecs Cup, PM: Philip Morris Korea Cup, D: Daehan Fire Insurance Cup

Season	Teams	K League	Pld	W	D	L	GF	GA	GD	Pts	League Cup	FA Cup	Super Cup	AFC Champions League	Manager
1996	9	9th	32	8	8	16	44	56	–12	32	8th (A)	Round of 16		Did not qualify	(South Korea) Cho Young-jeung
1997	10	9th	18	1	8	9	15	27	–12	11	10th (A); 3rd in Group A (P)	Semi-finals		Did not qualify	(South Korea) Park Byung-joo
1998	10	8th	18	9; 8	0; 2	9; 8	28	28	0	23	Semi-finals (A); 3rd (PM)	Winners		Did not qualify	(South Korea) Park Byung-joo
1999	10	9th	27	10; 8	0; 4	17; 15	38	52	–14	24	Runners-up (A); 4th in Group B (D)	Semi-finals	Runners-up	Did not qualify	(South Korea) Cho Kwang-rae
2000	10	Champions	27	19; 17	0; 5	8; 5	46	25	+21	53	Semi-finals (A); 5th in Group A (D)	Quarter-finals	Did not qualify	Quarter-finals^{[3]}	(South Korea) Cho Kwang-rae
2001	10	Runners-up	27	11	10	6	30	23	+7	43	4th in Group A (A)	Quarter-finals	Winners	Did not qualify	(South Korea) Cho Kwang-rae
2002	10	4th	27	11	7	9	37	30	+7	40	Semi-finals (A)	Round of 32	Did not qualify	Runners-up^{[4]}	(South Korea) Cho Kwang-rae
2003	12	8th	44	14	14	16	69	68	+1	56	No competition	Round of 32	No competition	Did not qualify	(South Korea) Cho Kwang-rae

^{[1]} In 2000, Tournament name was 1999–2000 Asian Cup Winners' Cup
^{[2]} In 2002, Tournament name was 2001-02 Asian Club Championship

=== K League Championship records ===
Season	Teams	Position	Pld	W	D	L	GF	GA	GD	PSO	Manager
2000	4	Winners	2	1	1	0	5	2	+1	4-2 W	(South Korea) Cho Kwang-Rae

== Kits ==
=== First Kit ===
1996	1997 – July 99	July 1999–01	2002^{(2)}	2003^{(2)}

=== Second Kit ===
1996	1997 – July 99	July 1999–01	2002–03

※ Notes
(2) 2002 1st kit and 2003 1st kit are same but colour of adidas logo and 3 stripes on shoulder are different

== Transfers ==
=== 1996 season ===
==== In ====
#	Name	POS	Moving from	Mode	Window	Period	Fee	Notes
1	(South Korea) Choi Tae-Jin	DF	(South Korea) Daewoo Royals		Winter			

===== Rookie Draft =====
#	Name	POS	Moving from	Mode	Notes
1	(South Korea) Lee In-Jae	FW	(South Korea) Chung-Ang University	Franchise	
2	(South Korea) Lee Young-Ik	DF	(South Korea) Korea University	Regular (1st)	
3	(South Korea) Kim Dong-Hae	MF	(South Korea) Hanyang University	Regular (2nd)	
4	(South Korea) Kim Seok-Hwan	DF	(South Korea) Yeungnam University	Regular (3rd)	
5	(South Korea) Oh Jae-Il	FW	(South Korea) Sungkyunkwan University	Regular (4th)	
6	(South Korea) Cha Yeon-Ju	FW	(South Korea) Andong National University	Regular (5th)	

==== Out ====
#	Name	POS	Moving from	Mode	Window	Period	Fee	Notes
1	(South Korea) Lee Boo-Yeol	DF	Unknown	Contract ended	Winter	N/A		

===== Loan & Military service =====
#	Name	POS	Moving to	Window	Period	Fee	Notes
1	(South Korea)		(South Korea)	Winter			

=== 1997 season ===
==== In ====
#	Name	POS	Moving from	Mode	Window	Period	Fee	Notes
1	(South Korea) Choi Tae-Jin	DF	(South Korea) Daewoo Royals		Winter			

===== Rookie Draft =====
#	Name	POS	Moving from	Mode	Notes
1	(South Korea) Lee In-Jae	FW	(South Korea) Chung-Ang University	Franchise	
2	(South Korea) Lee Young-Ik	DF	(South Korea) Korea University	Regular (1st)	
3	(South Korea) Kim Dong-Hae	MF	(South Korea) Hanyang University	Regular (2nd)	
4	(South Korea) Kim Seok-Hwan	DF	(South Korea) Yeungnam University	Regular (3rd)	
5	(South Korea) Oh Jae-Il	FW	(South Korea) Sungkyunkwan University	Regular (4th)	
6	(South Korea) Cha Yeon-Ju	FW	(South Korea) Andong National University	Regular (5th)	

==== Out ====
#	Name	POS	Moving from	Mode	Window	Period	Fee	Notes
1	(South Korea) Lee Boo-Yeol	DF	Unknown	Contract ended	Winter	N/A		

===== Loan & Military service =====
#	Name	POS	Moving to	Window	Period	Fee	Notes
1	(South Korea)		(South Korea)	Winter			

=== 1998 season ===
==== In ====
#	Name	POS	Moving from	Mode	Window	Period	Fee	Notes
1	(South Korea) Choi Tae-Jin	DF	(South Korea) Daewoo Royals		Winter			

===== Rookie Draft =====
#	Name	POS	Moving from	Mode	Notes
1	(South Korea) Lee In-Jae	FW	(South Korea) Chung-Ang University	Franchise	
2	(South Korea) Lee Young-Ik	DF	(South Korea) Korea University	Regular (1st)	
3	(South Korea) Kim Dong-Hae	MF	(South Korea) Hanyang University	Regular (2nd)	
4	(South Korea) Kim Seok-Hwan	DF	(South Korea) Yeungnam University	Regular (3rd)	
5	(South Korea) Oh Jae-Il	FW	(South Korea) Sungkyunkwan University	Regular (4th)	
6	(South Korea) Cha Yeon-Ju	FW	(South Korea) Andong National University	Regular (5th)	

==== Out ====
#	Name	POS	Moving from	Mode	Window	Period	Fee	Notes
1	(South Korea) Lee Boo-Yeol	DF	Unknown	Contract ended	Winter	N/A		

==== Loan & Military service ====
#	Name	POS	Moving to	Window	Period	Fee	Notes
1	(South Korea)		(South Korea)	Winter			

=== 1999 season ===
==== In ====
#	Name	POS	Moving from	Mode	Window	Period	Fee	Notes
1	(South Korea) Choi Tae-Jin	DF	(South Korea) Daewoo Royals		Winter			

===== Rookie Draft =====
#	Name	POS	Moving from	Mode	Notes
1	(South Korea) Lee In-Jae	FW	(South Korea) Chung-Ang University	Franchise	
2	(South Korea) Lee Young-Ik	DF	(South Korea) Korea University	Regular (1st)	
3	(South Korea) Kim Dong-Hae	MF	(South Korea) Hanyang University	Regular (2nd)	
4	(South Korea) Kim Seok-Hwan	DF	(South Korea) Yeungnam University	Regular (3rd)	
5	(South Korea) Oh Jae-Il	FW	(South Korea) Sungkyunkwan University	Regular (4th)	
6	(South Korea) Cha Yeon-Ju	FW	(South Korea) Andong National University	Regular (5th)	

==== Out ====
#	Name	POS	Moving from	Mode	Window	Period	Fee	Notes
1	(South Korea) Lee Boo-Yeol	DF	Unknown	Contract ended	Winter	N/A		

===== Loan & Military service =====
#	Name	POS	Moving to	Window	Period	Fee	Notes
1	(South Korea)		(South Korea)	Winter			

=== 2000 season ===
==== In ====
#	Name	POS	Moving from	Mode	Window	Period	Fee	Notes
1	(South Korea) Choi Tae-Jin	DF	(South Korea) Daewoo Royals		Winter			

===== Rookie Draft =====
#	Name	POS	Moving from	Mode	Notes
1	(South Korea) Lee In-Jae	FW	(South Korea) Chung-Ang University	Franchise	
2	(South Korea) Lee Young-Ik	DF	(South Korea) Korea University	Regular (1st)	
3	(South Korea) Kim Dong-Hae	MF	(South Korea) Hanyang University	Regular (2nd)	
4	(South Korea) Kim Seok-Hwan	DF	(South Korea) Yeungnam University	Regular (3rd)	
5	(South Korea) Oh Jae-Il	FW	(South Korea) Sungkyunkwan University	Regular (4th)	
6	(South Korea) Cha Yeon-Ju	FW	(South Korea) Andong National University	Regular (5th)	

==== Out ====
#	Name	POS	Moving from	Mode	Window	Period	Fee	Notes
1	(South Korea) Lee Boo-Yeol	DF	Unknown	Contract ended	Winter	N/A		

===== Loan & Military service =====
#	Name	POS	Moving to	Window	Period	Fee	Notes
1	(South Korea)		(South Korea)	Winter			

=== 2001 season ===
==== In ====
#	Name	POS	Moving from	Mode	Window	Period	Fee	Notes
1	(South Korea) Choi Tae-Jin	DF	(South Korea) Daewoo Royals		Winter			

===== Rookie Draft =====
#	Name	POS	Moving from	Mode	Notes
1	(South Korea) Lee In-Jae	FW	(South Korea) Chung-Ang University	Franchise	
2	(South Korea) Lee Young-Ik	DF	(South Korea) Korea University	Regular (1st)	
3	(South Korea) Kim Dong-Hae	MF	(South Korea) Hanyang University	Regular (2nd)	
4	(South Korea) Kim Seok-Hwan	DF	(South Korea) Yeungnam University	Regular (3rd)	
5	(South Korea) Oh Jae-Il	FW	(South Korea) Sungkyunkwan University	Regular (4th)	
6	(South Korea) Cha Yeon-Ju	FW	(South Korea) Andong National University	Regular (5th)	

==== Out ====
#	Name	POS	Moving from	Mode	Window	Period	Fee	Notes
1	(South Korea) Lee Boo-Yeol	DF	Unknown	Contract ended	Winter	N/A		

===== Loan & Military service =====
#	Name	POS	Moving to	Window	Period	Fee	Notes
1	(South Korea)		(South Korea)	Winter			

=== 2002 season ===
==== In ====
#	Name	POS	Moving from	Mode	Window	Period	Fee	Notes
1								

===== Rookie Free Agent =====
#	Name	POS	Moving from	Mode	Window	Period	Fee	Notes
1								

==== Out ====
#	Name	POS	Moving from	Mode	Window	Period	Fee	Notes
1								

===== Loan & Military service =====
#	Name	POS	Moving to	Window	Period	Fee	Notes
1	(South Korea)		(South Korea)	Winter		N/A	

=== 2003 season ===
==== In ====
#	Name	POS	Moving from	Mode	Window	Period	Fee	Notes
1	(South Korea) Park Kook-Chang	MF	(South Korea) Yukong Elephants		Summer			

===== Rookie Free Agent =====
#	Name	POS	Moving from	Mode	Window	Period	Fee	Notes
1	(South Korea) Jung Jo-Gook	FW	(South Korea) Dae Shin High School		Winter			

==== Out ====
#	Name	POS	Moving from	Mode	Window	Period	Fee	Notes
1	(Thailand) Piyapong Pue-on	FW	(Thailand) Pahang FA	Transfer	Summer	Unknown		

===== Loan & Military service =====
#	Name	POS	Moving to	Window	Period	Fee	Notes
1	(South Korea)		(South Korea)	Winter		N/A	

== See also ==
- FC Seoul
