= 2010 Jeonbuk Hyundai Motors season =

Jeonbuk Hyundai Motors
2010 season
- Chairman: Chung Mong-Koo
- Manager: Choi Kang-Hee
- K-League: 3rd
- Korean FA Cup: Quarterfinal
- League Cup: Runner-up
- Champions League: Quarterfinal
- Top goalscorer: League: Eninho (16); All: Eninho (24)
- Highest home attendance: 30,876 vs Seoul (8 August)
- Lowest home attendance: 1,862 vs Persipura (14 April)
- Average home league attendance: 11,209
Home colours	Away colours

The 2010 season was Jeonbuk Hyundai Motors's seventeenth season in the K-League in South Korea. Jeonbuk Hyundai Motors is competing in K-League, League Cup, Korean FA Cup and Champions League as defending champions.

== Current squad ==
Note: Flags indicate national team as defined under FIFA eligibility rules; some limited exceptions apply. Players may hold more than one non-FIFA nationality.

No.	Pos.	Nation	Player
1	GK	KOR	Kwon Sun-Tae
2	DF	KOR	Choi Chul-Soon
3	DF	KOR	Sung Jong-Hyun
4		KOR	Kim Sang-Sik (captain)
5	DF	KOR	Son Seung-Joon
6	MF	KOR	Jin Kyung-Sun
7	FW	KOR	Kim Seung-Yong
8	MF	BRA	Eninho
9	FW	KOR	Sim Woo-Yeon
10	FW	BRA	Luiz Henrique
13	MF	KOR	Jung Hoon
14	DF	KOR	Lee Yo-Han
15	DF	CHN	Feng Xiaoting
16	DF	KOR	Cho Sung-Hwan
17	MF	KOR	Lim You-Hwan
18	FW	KOR	Lee Gwang-Jae
19	FW	CRO	Krunoslav Lovrek
20	FW	KOR	Lee Dong-Gook
21	GK	KOR	Kim Min-Sik

No.	Pos.	Nation	Player
22	FW	KOR	Kim Hyeung-Bum
23	MF	KOR	Lim Sang-Hyub
24	MF	KOR	Kang Seung-Jo
26	MF	KOR	Seo Jung-Jin
27	MF	KOR	Kim Ji-Woong
28	MF	KOR	Kim Eui-Beom
29	DF	KOR	Lee Kwang-Hyun
30	DF	KOR	Lee Nam-Soo
31	GK	KOR	Hong Jeong-Nam
32	DF	KOR	Kim Sung-Jae
33	MF	KOR	Park Won-Jae
34	DF	KOR	Kim Min-Hak
35	MF	KOR	Hwang Min
36	FW	KOR	Kwon Soon-Hak
37	MF	KOR	Kim Eui-Seop
38	MF	KOR	Yang Dong-Cheol
39	FW	KOR	Song Jae-Han
40	GK	KOR	Lee Bum-Soo
41	GK	KOR	Joo Jae-Duk

== K-League ==
Date	Opponents	H / A	Result F – A	Scorers	Attendance	League position
27 February	Suwon Samsung Bluewings	H	3–1	Eninho 29', 69'(pen), Lovrek 90+1'	18,207	3rd
6 March	Jeju United	A	2–2	Luiz 14', Lovrek 54'	5,842	3rd
14 March	FC Seoul	A	1–0	Sim Woo-Yeon 87'	38,641	1st
19 March	Seongnam Ilhwa Chunma	H	1–1	Eninho 90+4'	10,647	1st
4 April	Incheon United	H	3–2	Kang Seung-Jo 34', Lee Dong-Gook 36', 75'	14,159	4th
10 April	Pohang Steelers	A	3–3	Choi Tae-Uk 19', Lee Dong-Gook 86', Eninho 90+4'(pen)	10,780	5th
18 April	Gwangju Sangmu FC	A	1–0	Eninho 15'	1,907	4th
24 April	Ulsan Hyundai Horang-i	H	1–2	Lee Dong-Gook 90+4'	14,493	6th
2 May	Gyeongnam FC	H	1–1	Lee Dong-Gook 90+8'	29,056	5th
5 May	Chunnam Dragons	A	2–3	Eninho 42', 70'(pen)	13,984	7th
10 July	Daegu FC	H	4–0	Lovrek 27', 51', Lee Dong-Gook 76', 90+2'	12,658	6th
17 July	Daejeon Citizen	A	4–0	Choi Tae-Uk 16', Lovrek 34', Eninho 42', Luiz 75'	15,336	6th
24 July	Gangwon FC	A	3–2	Lovrek 75', 90+1', Eninho 82'	10,726	4th
31 July	Busan I'Park	H	2–1	Sim Woo-Yeon 5', Kang Seung-Jo90+2'	14,291	2nd
8 August	FC Seoul	H	1–0	Eninho 57'	30,876	2nd
14 August	Gyeongnam FC	A	2–3	Eninho 64', Kang Seung-Jo 78'	11,254	3rd
22 August	Daejeon Citizen	H	3–2	Eninho 2', Lee Gwang-Jae 41', Kang Seung-Jo 90'	14,366	3rd
28 August	Seongnam Ilhwa Chunma	A	0–1		3,089	4th
4 September	Pohang Steelers	H	3–2	Eninho 45', Lee Dong-Gook 60', Lovrek 66'	10,388	4th
10 September	Gangwon FC	H	1–3	Lee Yo-Han 87'	5,064	4th
26 September	Incheon United	A	2–3	Kim Min-Hak 20'(pen), Kim Hyeung-Bum 84'(pen)	6,231	6th
2 October	Gwangju Sangmu FC	H	0–0		4,142	6th
9 October	Ulsan Hyundai FC	A	1–0	Lee Dong-Gook 59'	7,566	5th
16 October	Jeju United	H	1–1	Lee Dong-Gook 45'(pen)	10,854	5th
27 October	Daegu FC	A	1–0	Son Seung-Joon 90'	1,102	4th
30 October	Chunnam Dragons	H	3–1	Own goal 10', Eninho 76', Lovrek 79'	11,001	3rd
3 November	Busan I'Park	A	0–1		4,584	3rd
7 November	Suwon Samsung Bluewings	A	5–1	Eninho 13', Lee Dong-Gook 16', 90+2', Luiz 45', Son Seung-Joon 60'	31,718	3rd

Pos	Team	Pld	W	D	L	GF	GA	GD	Pts	Qualification
1	FC Seoul	28	20	2	6	58	26	+32	62	Qualification for the playoffs final
2	Jeju United	28	17	8	3	54	25	+29	59	Qualification for the playoffs semi-final
3	Jeonbuk Hyundai Motors	28	15	6	7	54	36	+18	51	Qualification for the playoffs first round
4	Ulsan Hyundai	28	15	5	8	47	30	+17	50	Qualification for the playoffs first round
5	Seongnam Ilhwa Chunma	28	13	9	6	46	26	+20	48	Qualification for the playoffs first round

Source: K League (in Korean)
Rules for classification: 1) Points; 2) Goal difference; 3) Goals scored

Pos	Team	Qualification
1	FC Seoul (C)	Qualification for the Champions League
2	Jeju United	Qualification for the Champions League
3	Jeonbuk Hyundai Motors	Qualification for the Champions League
4	Seongnam Ilhwa Chunma	
5	Ulsan Hyundai	
6	Gyeongnam FC	

Source: RSSSF
(C) Champions

=== Championship ===
Date	Round	Opponents	H / A	Result F – A	Scorers	Attendance
20 November	First round	Gyeongnam FC	H	2–0	Cho Sung-Hwan 10', Eninho 70'	18,525
24 November	Second round	Seongnam Ilhwa Chunma	H	1–0	Cho Sung-Hwan 22'	7,976
28 November	Semifinal	Jeju United FC	A	0–1		7,532

== Korean FA Cup ==
Date	Round	Opponents	H / A	Result F – A	Scorers	Attendance
21 April	Round of 32	Jeonju University	H	5–0	Lim Sang-Hyub 10', 54', 71', Seo Jung-Jin 43', Sim Woo-Yeon 55'	2,132
21 July	Round of 16	Gangneung City FC	H	2–1	Lee Kwang-Hyun 30', Eninho 68'	3,247
18 August	Quarterfinal	Suwon Samsung Bluewings	A	0–2		12,987

== League Cup ==
=== Group stage ===
Date	Opponents	H / A	Result F – A	Scorers	Attendance	Group position
22 May	Gyeongnam FC	H	2 – 1	Kang Seung-Jo 34', Lee Yo-Han 83'	4,491	2nd
26 May	Gangwon FC	A	4 – 1	Lovrek 11', 62', Eninho 18', Son Seung-Joon 33'	5,112	1st
30 May	Chunnam Dragons	H	1 – 1	Lovrek 90+1'	12,779	1st
6 June	Suwon Samsung Bluewings	A	3 – 1	Lovrek 7', Luiz 24', Eninho 84'	16,269	1st

Pos	Team	Pld	W	D	L	GF	GA	GD	Pts	JHM	GNM	SSB	JND	GWN
1	Jeonbuk Hyundai Motors	4	3	1	0	10	4	+6	10	—	2–1	—	1–1	—
2	Gyeongnam FC	4	3	0	1	8	4	+4	9	—	—	4–1	1–0	—
3	Suwon Samsung Bluewings	4	2	0	2	7	9	−2	6	1–3	—	—	—	2–0
4	Jeonnam Dragons	4	1	1	2	6	5	+1	4	—	—	2–3	—	3–0
5	Gangwon FC	4	0	0	4	2	11	−9	0	1–4	1–2	—	—	—

Source: RSSSF

=== Knockout stage ===
Date	Round	Opponents	H / A	Result F – A	Scorers	Attendance
14 July	Quarterfinal	Ulsan Hyundai FC	H	2–1	Kim Ji-Woong 7', Kim Seung-Yong 34'	6,980
28 July	Semifinal	Gyeongnam FC	H	2–1	Lee Dong-Gook 18', Luiz 38'	7,267
25 August	Final	FC Seoul	H	0–3		15,891

== Champions League ==
=== Group stage ===
Date	Opponents	H / A	Result F – A	Scorers	Attendance	Group position
23 February 2010	(Indonesia) Persipura Jayapura	A	4 – 1	Kim Seung-Yong 17'(pen), Lovrek 26', 67', 82'	7,534	1st
9 March 2010	(Japan) Kashima Antlers	H	1 – 2	Eninho 42'	3,800	3rd
24 March 2010	(China) Changchun Yatai	A	2 – 1	Choi Tae-Uk 75', Lee Dong-Gook 86'	18,000	2nd
30 March 2010	(China) Changchun Yatai	H	1 – 0	Lee Dong-Gook 54'	5,860	2nd
14 April 2010	(Indonesia) Persipura Jayapura	H	8 – 0	Eninho 12', 56', Sim Woo-Yeon 30', 80', 85', Lee Dong-Gook 40'(pen), Seo Jung-Jin 59', Lim Sang-Hyub 81'	1,862	2nd
28 May 2010	(Japan) Kashima Antlers	A	1 – 2	Jin Kyung-Sun 77'	6,490	2nd

Pos	Team	Pld	W	D	L	GF	GA	GD	Pts	Qualification
1	(Japan) Kashima Antlers	6	6	0	0	14	3	+11	18	Advance to knockout stage
2	(South Korea) Jeonbuk Hyundai Motors	6	4	0	2	17	6	+11	12	Advance to knockout stage
3	(China) Changchun Yatai	6	1	0	5	10	7	+3	3	
4	(Indonesia) Persipura Jayapura	6	1	0	5	4	29	−25	3	

Source: AFC Champions League Official Page

=== Knockout stage ===
Date	Round	Opponents	H / A	Result F – A	Scorers	Attendance
12 May 2010	Round of 16	(Australia) Adelaide United	A	3 – 2 (a.e.t.)	Eninho 38', 87', Lee Dong-Gook 116'	12,015
15 September 2010	Quarterfinal 1st leg	(Saudi Arabia) Al-Shabab	H	0 – 2		6,784
21 September 2010	Quarterfinal 2nd leg	(Saudi Arabia) Al-Shabab	A	1 – 0	Kim Ji-Woong 24'	8,340

== Squad statistics ==
=== Appearances and goals ===
Statistics accurate as of match played 28 November 2010

No.	Nat.	Pos.	Name	League		FA Cup		League Cup		Asia		Appearances		Goals
No.	Nat.	Pos.	Name	Apps	Goals	Apps	Goals	Apps	Goals	Apps	Goals	App (sub)	Total	Goals
1	(South Korea)	GK	Kwon Sun-Tae	24	0	1	0	6	0	6	0	37 (0)	37	0
2	(South Korea)	DF	Choi Chul-Soon	20	0	0	0	1	0	3	0	24 (0)	24	0
3	(South Korea)	DF	Sung Jong-Hyun	6 (1)	0	2	0	2	0	1	0	11 (1)	12	0
4	(South Korea)	DF	Kim Sang-Sik (C)	20 (2)	0	2	0	5 (1)	0	6	0	33 (3)	36	0
5	(South Korea)	DF	Son Seung-Joon	15 (2)	2	1	0	5	1	5	0	26 (2)	28	3
6	(South Korea)	MF	Jin Kyung-Sun	22 (1)	0	2	0	5 (1)	0	4 (1)	1	33 (3)	36	1
7	(South Korea)	FW	Kim Seung-Yong	1 (3)	0	0 (1)	0	1	1	2 (1)	1	4 (5)	9	2
8	(Brazil)	MF	Eninho	26 (1)	16	1 (1)	1	6	2	7 (1)	5	40 (3)	43	24
9	(South Korea)	FW	Sim Woo-Yeon	19 (5)	2	1 (1)	1	3 (2)	0	6 (1)	3	29 (9)	38	6
10	(Brazil)	FW	Luiz Henrique	19 (5)	3	3	0	2 (2)	2	4 (3)	0	28 (10)	38	5
13	(South Korea)	MF	Jung Hoon	10 (1)	0	1	0	0 (3)	0	3	0	14 (4)	18	0
14	(South Korea)	DF	Lee Yo-Han	6	1	1	0	4	1	1	0	12 (0)	12	2
15	(China)	DF	Feng Xiaoting	11	0	1	0	1	0	7	0	20 (0)	20	0
16	(South Korea)	DF	Cho Sung-Hwan	11	2	0	0	0	0	1 (1)	0	12 (1)	13	2
17	(South Korea)	MF	Lim You-Hwan	14	0	1	0	5	0	4	0	24 (0)	24	0
18	(South Korea)	FW	Lee Gwang-Jae	4 (5)	1	1 (1)	0	1 (2)	0	0 (2)	0	6 (10)	16	1
19	(Croatia)	FW	Krunoslav Lovrek	7 (17)	9	1 (1)	0	3 (2)	4	2 (5)	3	13 (25)	38	16
20	(South Korea)	FW	Lee Dong-Gook	25 (3)	12	1 (1)	0	2	1	7 (1)	4	35 (5)	40	17
21	(South Korea)	GK	Kim Min-Sik	6	0	2	0	1	0	3	0	12 (0)	12	0
22	(South Korea)	FW	Kim Hyeung-Bum	4 (2)	1	1 (1)	0	0 (3)	0	0	0	5 (6)	11	1
23	(South Korea)	MF	Lim Sang-Hyub	4 (2)	0	2	3	0 (1)	0	0 (4)	1	6 (7)	13	4
24	(South Korea)	MF	Kang Seung-Jo	11 (12)	4	2	0	5 (1)	1	4 (1)	0	22 (14)	36	5
25	(South Korea)	MF	Jeon Kwang-Hwan	1	0	0	0	0	0	0	0	1 (0)	1	0
26	(South Korea)	MF	Seo Jung-Jin	6 (8)	0	2	1	3	0	4 (2)	1	15 (10)	25	2
27	(South Korea)	MF	Kim Ji-Woong	10 (3)	0	0	0	3	1	2	1	15 (3)	18	2
28	(South Korea)	MF	Kim Eui-Beom	0	0	0	0	0 (1)	0	0	0	0 (1)	1	0
29	(South Korea)	DF	Lee Kwang-Hyun	1 (4)	0	2	1	1	0	0 (1)	0	4 (5)	9	1
30	(South Korea)	DF	Lee Nam-Soo	0	0	0	0	0	0	0	0	0	0	0
31	(South Korea)	GK	Hong Jeong-Nam	0 (1)	0	0	0	0 (1)	0	0	0	0 (2)	2	0
32	(South Korea)	DF	Kim Sung-Jae	0	0	0	0	0	0	0	0	0	0	0
33	(South Korea)	MF	Park Won-Jae	15 (2)	0	0	0	3	0	7	0	25 (2)	27	0
34	(South Korea)	DF	Kim Min-Hak	3 (1)	1	1	0	1	0	0	0	5 (1)	6	1
35	(South Korea)	MF	Hwang Min	0	0	0	0	0	0	0	0	0	0	0
36	(South Korea)	FW	Kwon Soon-Hak	0 (1)	0	0 (1)	0	0	0	0	0	0 (2)	2	0
37	(South Korea)	MF	Kim Eui-Seop	0 (1)	0	0	0	0	0	0	0	0 (1)	1	0
38	(South Korea)	MF	Yang Dong-Cheol	1 (1)	0	0	0	1	0	0	0	2 (1)	3	0
39	(South Korea)	FW	Song Jae-Han	0	0	0	0	0	0	0	0	0	0	0
40	(South Korea)	GK	Lee Bum-Soo	1	0	0	0	0	0	0	0	1 (0)	1	0
41	(South Korea)	GK	Joo Jae-Duk	0	0	0	0	0	0	0	0	0	0	0
11	(South Korea)	MF	Choi Tae-Uk (out)	10 (2)	2	0	0	2 (1)	0	5 (1)	1	17 (4)	21	3
16	(South Korea)	DF	Shin Kwang-Hoon (out)	7	0	1	0	5	0	6	0	19 (0)	19	0

=== Top scorers ===
Position	Nation	Number	Name	K-League	KFA Cup	League Cup	Champions League	Total
1	(Brazil)	8	Eninho	16	1	2	5	24
2	(South Korea)	20	Lee Dong-Gook	12	0	1	4	17
3	(Croatia)	19	Krunoslav Lovrek	9	0	4	3	16
4	(South Korea)	9	Sim Woo-Yeon	2	1	0	3	6
5	(South Korea)	24	Kang Seung-Jo	4	0	1	0	5
=	(Brazil)	10	Luiz	3	0	2	0	5
6	(South Korea)	23	Lim Sang-Hyub	0	3	0	1	4
7	(South Korea)	11	Choi Tae-Uk	2	0	0	1	3
=	(South Korea)	5	Son Seung-Joon	2	0	1	0	3
8	(South Korea)	16	Cho Sung-Hwan	2	0	0	0	2
=	(South Korea)	14	Lee Yo-Han	1	0	1	0	2
=	(South Korea)	26	Seo Jung-Jin	0	1	0	1	2
=	(South Korea)	7	Kim Seung-Yong	0	0	1	1	2
=	(South Korea)	27	Kim Ji-Woong	0	0	1	1	2
9	(South Korea)	18	Lee Gwang-Jae	1	0	0	0	1
=	(South Korea)	22	Kim Hyeung-Bum	1	0	0	0	1
=	(South Korea)	34	Kim Min-Hak	1	0	0	0	1
=	(South Korea)	6	Jin Kyung-Sun	0	0	0	1	1
=	(South Korea)	29	Lee Kwang-Hyun	0	1	0	0	1
/	/	/	Own Goals	1	0	0	0	1
			TOTALS	57	7	14	21	99

=== Discipline ===
Position	Nation	Number	Name	K-League		KFA Cup		League Cup		Champions League		Total	
Position	Nation	Number	Name	Booked	Sent off (straight red)	Booked	Sent off (straight red)	Booked	Sent off (straight red)	Booked	Sent off (straight red)	Booked	Sent off (straight red)
GK	(South Korea)	1	Kwon Sun-Tae	0	0	0	0	1	0	1	0	2	0
DF	(South Korea)	2	Choi Chul-Soon	7	1	0	0	0	0	0	0	7	1
DF	(South Korea)	3	Sung Jong-Hyun	2	0	1	0	2	0	1	0	6	0
DF	(South Korea)	4	Kim Sang-Sik	9	0	2	1	1	0	2	0	14	1
DF	(South Korea)	5	Son Seung-Joon	15	1	0	0	2	0	0	0	17	1
MF	(South Korea)	6	Jin Kyung-Sun	8	0	1	0	1	0	2	0	12	0
MF	(South Korea)	7	Kim Seung-Yong	0	0	1	0	1	0	0	0	2	0
MF	(Brazil)	8	Eninho	4	0	1	0	2	0	1	0	8	0
FW	(South Korea)	9	Sim Woo-Yeon	2	0	0	0	0	0	1	0	3	0
FW	(Brazil)	10	Luiz	2	0	1	0	1	0	2	0	6	0
MF	(South Korea)	13	Jung Hoon	5	0	1	0	1	0	2	0	9	0
DF	(South Korea)	14	Lee Yo-Han	1	0	0	0	1	0	0	0	2	0
DF	(China)	15	Feng Xiaoting	1	0	0	0	0	0	1	0	2	0
DF	(South Korea)	16	Shin Kwang-Hoon	3	0	0	0	0	0	1	0	4	0
DF	(South Korea)	16	Cho Sung-Hwan	3	0	0	0	0	0	0	0	3	0
MF	(South Korea)	17	Lim You-Hwan	2	0	1	0	1	0	1	0	5	0
FW	(South Korea)	18	Lee Gwang-Jae	2	0	0	0	0	0	0	0	2	0
FW	(Croatia)	19	Krunoslav Lovrek	3	0	0	0	1	0	0	0	4	0
FW	(South Korea)	20	Lee Dong-Gook	2	1	0	0	0	0	1	0	3	1
MF	(South Korea)	22	Kim Hyeung-Bum	1	0	0	0	0	0	0	0	1	0
MF	(South Korea)	23	Lim Sang-Hyub	0	0	1	0	0	0	0	0	1	0
MF	(South Korea)	24	Kang Seung-Jo	3	0	1	0	4	0	3	0	11	0
MF	(South Korea)	26	Seo Jung-Jin	0	0	1	0	2	1	1	0	4	1
MF	(South Korea)	27	Kim Ji-Woong	3	0	0	0	1	0	1	0	5	0
DF	(South Korea)	29	Lee Kwang-Hyun	0	0	1	0	0	0	0	0	1	0
DF	(South Korea)	33	Park Won-Jae	4	0	0	0	2	0	1	0	7	0
DF	(South Korea)	34	Kim Min-Hak	0	0	1	0	0	0	0	0	1	0
MF	(South Korea)	38	Yang Dong-Cheol	0	0	0	0	1	0	0	0	1	0
/	/	/	TOTALS	82	3	14	1	25	1	22	0	143	5

== Transfer ==
=== In ===
- 29 July 2010 – Cho Sung-Hwan move from Consadole Sapporo
- 30 October 2010 – Jeon Kwang-Hwan move from Gwangju Sangmu FC

=== Out ===
- 27 July 2010 – Choi Tae-Uk move to FC Seoul
- 29 July 2010 – Shin Kwang-Hoon move to Pohang Steelers (loan end)
