= 2001 R League =

Reserve League
- Season: 2001
- Dates: 19 April – 27 September 2001
- Champions: Central League: Seongnam Ilhwa Chunma; Southern League: Pohang Steelers; Championship: Seongnam Ilhwa Chunma
- Matches played: 83
- Goals scored: 268 (3.23 per match)
- Best Player: Back Young-chul
- Top goalscorer: Hwang In-soo (10 goals)

The 2001 Korean Professional Football Reserve League was the third season of the R League.

== Central League ==
Pos	Team	Pld	W	D	L	GF	GA	GD	Pts	Qualification
1	Seongnam Ilhwa Chunma (C)	16	10	3	3	39	16	+23	33	Qualification for the Championship
2	Anyang LG Cheetahs	16	9	1	6	31	29	+2	28	Qualification for the Championship
3	Suwon Samsung Bluewings	16	8	3	5	25	18	+7	27	
4	Bucheon SK	16	6	3	7	26	32	−6	21	
5	Korean Police	16	1	2	13	14	40	−26	5	

== Southern League ==
Pos	Team	Pld	W	D	L	GF	GA	GD	Pts	Qualification
1	Pohang Steelers (C)	16	13	1	2	35	11	+24	40	Qualification for the Championship
2	Jeonnam Dragons	16	9	1	6	27	16	+11	28	Qualification for the Championship
3	Busan I'Cons	16	5	3	8	20	32	−12	18	
4	Jeonbuk Hyundai Motors	16	4	5	7	21	26	−5	17	
5	Ulsan Hyundai Horang-i	16	2	4	10	16	34	−18	10	

== Championship playoffs ==
=== Bracket ===
Semi-finals
20 September – Yongin
Seongnam Ilhwa Chunma	3
Jeonnam Dragons	2
20 September – Pohang
Pohang Steelers	1
Anyang LG Cheetahs (a.e.t.)	3

Final
24, 27 September – Yongin, Guri
Seongnam Ilhwa Chunma	2	2	4
Anyang LG Cheetahs	1	0	1

=== Semi-finals ===
20 September 2001
15:00 UTC+9

Seongnam Ilhwa Chunma	3–2	Jeonnam Dragons

Yongin Stadium, Yongin

20 September 2001
15:00 UTC+9

Pohang Steelers	1–3	Anyang LG Cheetahs

Pohang Stadium, Pohang

=== Final ===
24 September 2001
15:00 UTC+9

Seongnam Ilhwa Chunma	2–1	Anyang LG Cheetahs

Yongin Stadium, Yongin

27 September 2001
15:00 UTC+9

Anyang LG Cheetahs	0–2	Seongnam Ilhwa Chunma

Guri Champions Park, Guri

Seongnam Ilhwa Chunma won 4–1 on aggregate.

== See also ==
- 2001 in South Korean football
