= Champions Park =

Champions Park may refer to:

- GS Champions Park, in Guri, Seoul, South Korea, the training center of FC Seoul
- LG Champion's Park, in Icheon, Seoul, South Korea, a multi-purpose sports facility
- Champions Park, in Newberry, Florida, U.S.
- Louisville Champions Park, in Louisville, Kentucky, U.S.
