= 2002 R League =

Reserve League
- Season: 2002
- Dates: 4 April – 7 September 2002
- Champions: Central League: Seongnam Ilhwa Chunma; Southern League: Gwangju Sangmu Bulsajo; Championship: Anyang LG Cheetahs
- Best Player: Park Dong-suk
- Top goalscorer: Lee Seon-woo; Seo Kwan-soo; Jeong Jae-seok; Bae Jin-su (7 goals each)

The 2002 Korean Professional Football Reserve League was the fourth season of the R League. Anyang LG Cheetahs won the national title after defeating Seongnam Ilhwa Chunma in the Championship final.

== Central League ==
Pos	Team	Pld	W	D	L	GF	GA	GD	Pts	Qualification
1	Seongnam Ilhwa Chunma (C)	20	13	5	2	37	18	+19	44	Qualification for the Championship
2	Anyang LG Cheetahs	20	11	6	3	44	22	+22	39	Qualification for the Championship
3	Suwon Samsung Bluewings	20	7	5	8	33	35	−2	26	
4	Bucheon SK	20	4	7	9	25	32	−7	19	
5	Jeonbuk Hyundai Motors	20	4	6	10	29	45	−16	18	
6	Korean Police	20	5	3	12	23	39	−16	18	

== Southern League ==
Pos	Team	Pld	W	D	L	GF	GA	GD	Pts	Qualification
1	Gwangju Sangmu Bulsajo (C)	16	7	7	2	33	18	+15	28	Qualification for the Championship
2	Jeonnam Dragons	16	7	4	5	29	27	+2	25	Qualification for the Championship
3	Busan I'Cons	16	6	7	3	25	23	+2	25	
4	Ulsan Hyundai Horang-i	16	3	6	7	28	34	−6	15	
5	Pohang Steelers	16	1	8	7	25	38	−13	11	

== Championship playoffs ==
Semi-finals
Seongnam Ilhwa Chunma	3
Jeonnam Dragons	0
Gwangju Sangmu Bulsajo	0
Anyang LG Cheetahs	1

Final
Seongnam Ilhwa Chunma	0	0	0
Anyang LG Cheetahs	1	0	1

== See also ==
- 2002 in South Korean football
