= Cho Byung-young =

South Korean footballer (born 1966)

Cho Byung-Young
Personal information
- Full name: Cho Byung-Young
- Date of birth: January 22, 1966 (age 60)
- Place of birth: South Korea
- Height: 1.76 m (5 ft 9 1/2 in)
- Position: Defender

Youth career
- Andong National University

Senior career*
| Years | Team | Apps | (Gls) |
| 1988–1997 | Lucky-Goldstar Hwangso; LG Cheetahs; Anyang LG Cheetahs | 152 | (2) |

Managerial career
- 2011: Ansan Bukok Elementary School
- * Club domestic league appearances and goals as of 17 August 2011 ‡ National team caps and goals as of 17 August 2011

Cho Byung-Young (born January 22, 1966) is a South Korean former footballer.

He graduated in Andong National University, and played for LG Cheetahs.

== Club career ==
- 1988-1997 Lucky-Goldstar Hwangso / LG Cheetahs / Anyang LG Cheetahs

== Honours ==
=== Player ===
- Lucky-Goldstar Hwangso / LG Cheetahs / Anyang LG Cheetahs
- K-League Winners (1) : 1990

=== Individual ===
Sporting positions
| Preceded by Lee Young-Ik | Anyang LG Cheetahs captain 1997 | Succeeded by Kim Bong-Soo |
