= 2000 R League =

Reserve League
- Season: 2000
- Dates: 20 April – 12 October 2000
- Champions: Central League: Anyang LG Cheetahs; Southern League: Jeonnam Dragons; Championship: Anyang LG Cheetahs
- Matches played: 75
- Goals scored: 242 (3.23 per match)
- Best Player: Kim Woo-jae
- Top goalscorer: Wang Jung-hyun (8 goals)

The 2000 Korean Professional Football Reserve League was the second season of the R League. Anyang LG Cheetahs won their first national title after defeating Seongnam Ilhwa Chunma in the Championship final.

== Central League ==
Pos	Team	Pld	W	D	L	GF	GA	GD	Pts	Qualification
1	Anyang LG Cheetahs (C)	16	8	4	4	32	22	+10	28	Qualification for the Championship
2	Seongnam Ilhwa Chunma	16	7	4	5	31	25	+6	25	Qualification for the Championship
3	Suwon Samsung Bluewings	16	6	6	4	24	21	+3	24	
4	Jeonbuk Hyundai Motors	16	4	7	5	24	29	−5	18	
5	Bucheon SK	16	3	3	10	21	35	−14	12	

== Southern League ==
Pos	Team	Pld	W	D	L	GF	GA	GD	Pts	Qualification
1	Jeonnam Dragons (C)	12	6	2	4	22	17	+5	20	Qualification for the Championship
2	Ulsan Hyundai Horang-i	12	6	1	5	20	21	−1	19	Qualification for the Championship
3	Busan I'Cons	12	4	3	5	20	22	−2	15	
4	Pohang Steelers	12	4	2	6	23	25	−2	14	

== Championship playoffs ==
=== Bracket ===
Semi-finals
5 October – Guri
Anyang LG Cheetahs	5
Ulsan Hyundai Horang-i	2
5 October – Gwangyang
Jeonnam Dragons	1
Seongnam Ilhwa Chunma (a.e.t.)	2

Final
9, 12 October – Guri, Yongin
Anyang LG Cheetahs (p)	0	4	4 (4)
Seongnam Ilhwa Chunma	1	3	4 (3)

=== Semi-finals ===
5 October 2000
15:00 UTC+9

Anyang LG Cheetahs	5–2	Ulsan Hyundai Horang-i

Guri Champions Park, Guri

5 October 2000
15:00 UTC+9

Jeonnam Dragons	1–2	Seongnam Ilhwa Chunma

Gwangyang Stadium, Gwangyang

=== Final ===
9 October 2000
15:00 UTC+9

Anyang LG Cheetahs	0–1	Seongnam Ilhwa Chunma

Guri Champions Park, Guri

12 October 2000
15:00 UTC+9

Seongnam Ilhwa Chunma	3–4 (a.e.t.)	Anyang LG Cheetahs
Penalties
	3–4

Yongin Stadium, Yongin

4–4 on aggregate. Anyang LG Cheetahs won 4–3 on penalties.

== See also ==
- 2000 in South Korean football
