= Jung Sung-min =

South Korean footballer (born 1989)

Jung Sung-Min
Personal information
- Full name: Jung Sung-Min
- Date of birth: 2 May 1989 (age 37)
- Place of birth: South Korea
- Height: 1.84 m (6 ft 1/2 in)
- Position: Forward

Team information
- Current team: Busan IPark
- Number: 20

Youth career
- 2007–2010: Kwangwoon University

Senior career*
Years	Team	Apps	(Gls)
2011–2012	Gangwon FC	35	(6)
2013–2017	Gyeongnam FC	19	(0)
2013–2014	→ Chungju Hummel (loan)	44	(13)
2016–2017	→ Asan Mugunghwa (loan)	38	(7)
2018	Seongnam FC	23	(10)
2019–	Busan IPark	4	(0)
- * Club domestic league appearances and goals as of 12 November 2020

Jung Sung-Min (Korean: 정성민; born 2 May 1989) is a South Korean football forward who plays for Busan IPark.

== Club career ==
Jung, having spent his youth career with Kwangwoon University, was selected by Gangwon FC from the 2011 K-League draft intake. His first game for Gangwon was as a late substitute in the second round match of the 2011 K-League Cup against the Chunnam Dragons. His first match in the K-League itself was also as a late match substitute, in the drawn match against Seongnam Ilhwa Chunma on 8 May 2011.

== Honors ==
Individual

- K-League Reserve League Top scorer : 2011

== Club career statistics ==
As of 19 December 2013

Club performance			League		Cup		League Cup		Total	
Season	Club	League	Apps	Goals	Apps	Goals	Apps	Goals	Apps	Goals
South Korea			League		KFA Cup		League Cup		Total	
2011	Gangwon FC	K League 1	10	1	3	0	3	0	16	1
2012	Gangwon FC	K League 1	25	5	0	0	-		25	5
2013	Gyeongnam FC	K League 1	1	0	1	0	-		2	0
2013	Chungju Hummel FC	K League 2	14	6	0	0	-		14	6
Career total			50	6	4	0	3	0	57	6
