= R League =

- Organising body: K League Federation
- Founded: 1990
- Country: South Korea
- Number of clubs: 16
- Current champions: Group A: FC Seoul; Group B: Pohang Steelers (2019)
- Most championships: FC Seoul (10 titles)

The R League (Korean: R리그), also known as the Korean Professional Football Reserve League, is the league for reserve teams of professional football clubs in South Korea.

== History ==
The Korean Reserve League was started in 1990 with reserve teams of five K League clubs.

It was not held for nine years after the inaugural season, but was relaunched in a new format in 2000. The participating teams were split into two or three group leagues, and the highest ranking teams of each league qualified for playoffs to determine the overall champions. It was renamed "R League" in 2009. The Korea Police FC participated in the R League until 2012, although it was not a reserve team of a K League club.

The R League was abolished in 2013 following the foundation of the K League 2, which needed participating players, but was restarted in 2016. It was once again ceased in 2020 due to the COVID-19 pandemic. In 2021, the Korea Football Association (KFA) allowed reserve teams to join the football league pyramid through the semi-professional K3 League and K4 League. Plans to resume the R League were scrapped due to a lack of participating teams as a number of teams elected to participate in the K4 League instead.

== Champions ==
=== Champions by season ===
==== Reserve League (1990) ====
Edition	Season	Single league
1	1990	POSCO Atoms

==== Reserve League (2000–2005) ====
Edition	Season	Championship	Central League	Southern League
2	2000	Anyang LG Cheetahs	Anyang LG Cheetahs	Jeonnam Dragons
3	2001	Seongnam Ilhwa Chunma	Seongnam Ilhwa Chunma	Pohang Steelers
4	2002	Anyang LG Cheetahs	Seongnam Ilhwa Chunma	Gwangju Sangmu Bulsajo
5	2003	Not held	Seongnam Ilhwa Chunma	Jeonnam Dragons
6	2004	FC Seoul	Seongnam Ilhwa Chunma	Pohang Steelers
7	2005	Bucheon SK	FC Seoul	Jeonnam Dragons

==== Reserve League (2006–2008) ====
Edition	Season	Championship	Group A	Group B	Group C
8	2006	Incheon United	FC Seoul	Incheon United	Jeonnam Dragons
9	2007	Pohang Steelers	Seongnam Ilhwa Chunma	Jeju United	Pohang Steelers
10	2008	Incheon United	Seongnam Ilhwa Chunma	Gyeongnam FC	Not held

==== R League (2009) ====
Edition	Season	Championship	Group A	Group B	Group C
11	2009	Incheon United	Incheon United	Jeonbuk Hyundai Motors	Pohang Steelers

==== R League (2010–present) ====
Edition	Season	Single league	Group A	Group B
12	2010	Not held	FC Seoul	Pohang Steelers
13	2011	Not held	Seongnam Ilhwa Chunma	Sangju Sangmu Phoenix
14	2012	Not held	Korean Police	Busan IPark
15	2016	Not held	FC Seoul	Daegu FC
16	2017	Ulsan Hyundai	Not held	
17	2018	Not held	FC Seoul	Daejeon Citizen
18	2019	Not held	FC Seoul	Pohang Steelers
19	2022	Unknown		

=== Performance by club ===
K League's principle of official statistics is that final club succeeds to predecessor club's history & records.

Club	Group	National titles	Group titles	Total
FC Seoul	A	3 (2000, 2002, 2004)	7 (2000, 2005, 2006, 2010, 2016, 2018, 2019)	10
Incheon United	A	3 (2006, 2008, 2009)	2 (2006, 2009)	5
Pohang Steelers	B	2 (1990, 2007)	6 (2001, 2004, 2007, 2009, 2010, 2019)	8
Seongnam Ilhwa Chunma	A	1 (2001)	7 (2001, 2002, 2003, 2004, 2007, 2008, 2011)	8
Jeju United	B	1 (2005)	1 (2007)	2
Ulsan Hyundai	B	1 (2017)	—	1
Jeonnam Dragons	B	—	4 (2000, 2003, 2005, 2006)	4
Sangju Sangmu Phoenix	B	—	2 (2002, 2011)	2
Gyeongnam FC	B	—	1 (2008)	1
Jeonbuk Hyundai Motors	B	—	1 (2009)	1
Korean Police	A	—	1 (2012)	1
Busan IPark	B	—	1 (2012)	1
Daegu FC	B	—	1 (2016)	1
Daejeon Citizen	B	—	1 (2018)	1

== Awards ==
=== Most Valuable Player ===
Season	Player	Club
1990	(South Korea) Choi Moon-sik	POSCO Atoms
2000	(South Korea) Kim Woo-jae	Seongnam Ilhwa Chunma
2001	(South Korea) Back Young-chul	Seongnam Ilhwa Chunma
2002	(South Korea) Park Dong-suk	Anyang LG Cheetahs
2003	Not awarded	
2004	(South Korea) Han Dong-won	FC Seoul
2005	(South Korea) Yoo Hyun-goo	Bucheon SK
2006	(South Korea) Lee Keun-ho	Incheon United
2007	(South Korea) Lee Won-jae	Pohang Steelers
2008	(South Korea) Kang Su-il	Incheon United
2009	(South Korea) Kim Sun-woo	Incheon United

=== Top goalscorer ===
Season	Player	Club	Goals	Apps	Ratio
1990	(South Korea) Kim Dong-hae	Lucky-Goldstar Hwangso	7	?	?
2000	(South Korea) Wang Jung-hyun	Anyang LG Cheetahs	8	8	1.00
2001	(South Korea) Hwang In-soo	Suwon Samsung Bluewings	10	13	0.77
2002	(South Korea) Lee Sun-woo	Suwon Samsung Bluewings	7	13	0.54
2003	(South Korea) Back Young-chul	Seongnam Ilhwa Chunma	8	13	0.62
2004	(South Korea) Bu Young-tae	Busan IPark	8	8	1.00
2005	(South Korea) Han Dong-won	FC Seoul	10	20	0.50
2006	(South Korea) Song Keun-soo	Gwangju Sangmu	11	16	0.69
2007	(South Korea) Yoon Jun-soo	Jeonnam Dragons	8	16	0.50
2008	(South Korea) Yoo Chang-hyun	Pohang Steelers	13	23	0.57
2009	(South Korea) Song Je-heon	Daegu FC	8	13	0.62
2010	(Brazil) Eraldo Anício Gomes	Jeju United	7	4	1.75
2011	(South Korea) Jung Sung-min	Gangwon FC	10	17	0.59
2012	(South Korea) Kim Young-hoo	Korean Police	11	14	0.79
2016	(South Korea) Han Hong-gyu	Ansan Mugunghwa	9	10	0.9
2017	(South Korea) Kim Hee-won	Seoul E-Land	11	16	0.69
2018	(South Korea) Kwon Ki-pyo	Pohang Steelers	14	19	0.74
2019	(South Korea) Jeon Hyeon-chul	Daegu FC	13	11	1.18

=== Top assist provider ===
Season	Player	Club	Assists	Apps	Ratio
1990	(South Korea) Ahn Ki-chul	Daewoo Royals	?	?	?
2000	(South Korea) Shin Jong-hyok	Pohang Steelers	6	12	0.50
2001	(South Korea) Lee Jung-woon	Pohang Steelers	5	13	0.38
2002	(South Korea) Kim Woo-jae	Seongnam Ilhwa Chunma	6	18	0.33
2003	(South Korea) Park Won-jae	Pohang Steelers	4	13	0.31
2004	(South Korea) Jang Dong-hyun	Seongnam Ilhwa Chunma	5	17	0.29
2005	(South Korea) Yu Hyun-goo	Jeju United	8	21	0.38
2006	(South Korea) Lee Keun-ho	Incheon United	7	20	0.35
2007	(South Korea) Hwang Jin-sung	Pohang Steelers	5	5	1.00
2008	(South Korea) Lee Tae-young	Pohang Steelers	7	21	0.33
2009	(South Korea) Choi Sung-hyun	Suwon Samsung Bluewings	5	7	0.71
2010	(South Korea) Kim Eun-hu	Jeonbuk Hyundai Motors	6	10	0.60
2011	(South Korea) Sin Jin-ho	Pohang Steelers	7	17	0.41
2012	(South Korea) Choi Jin-soo	Ulsan Hyundai	5	10	0.50
2016	(South Korea) Kim Dae-won	Daegu FC	5	13	0.38
2017	(South Korea) Kim Soo-beom	Jeju United	5	9	0.56
2018	(South Korea) Song Min-kyu	Pohang Steelers	8	18	0.44
2019	(South Korea) Park Tae-jun	Seongnam FC	7	8	0.88

== See also ==
- K League
- U-League (association football)
