= Park Yo-seb =

South Korean football player (born 1980)

Park Yo-Seb 박요셉
Personal information
- Full name: Park Yo-Seb
- Date of birth: December 3, 1980 (age 45)
- Place of birth: Suncheon, Jeonnam, South Korea
- Height: 1.83 m (6 ft 0 in)
- Positions: Midfielder; defender

Youth career
- 1999–2001: Jeonju University

Senior career*
Years	Team	Apps	(Gls)
2002–2008	Anyang LG Cheetahs / FC Seoul	51	(4)
2005–2006	→ Gwangju Sangmu (military service)	26	(0)
2009–2010	Gangneung City		
2010–2011	Tampines Rovers		

International career^{‡}
2004	South Korea	6	(0)

Managerial career
- 2015–2016: FC Seoul U-12
- * Club domestic league appearances and goals as of April 1, 2008 ‡ National team caps and goals as of March 29, 2008

- Park Yo-seb
- Hangul: 박요셉
- Hanja: 朴요셉
- RR: Bak Yosep
- MR: Pak Yosep

Park Yo-seb
Medal record

Representing South Korea

Men's football

Asian Games
Bronze medal – third place	2002 Busan	Team

Park Yo-Seb (born December 3, 1980) is a South Korean football player who has played for FC Seoul, Gwangju Sangmu FC (Military service), Gangneung City in South Korea.

He was plying his trade with Singaporean side Tampines Rovers FC in the S-League after his move to the Super Reds failed to materialise when the latter failed to gain admission into the S-League 2010.

== Club career statistics ==
Club performance			League		Cup		League Cup		Continental		Total	
Season	Club	League	Apps	Goals	Apps	Goals	Apps	Goals	Apps	Goals	Apps	Goals
South Korea			League		KFA Cup		League Cup		Asia		Total	
2002	Anyang LG Cheetahs	K-League	14	0	?	?	5	0	?	?		
2003	Anyang LG Cheetahs	K-League	16	3	1	0	-		-		17	3
2004	FC Seoul	K-League	20	1	0	0	5	0	-		25	1
2005	Gwangju Sangmu Bulsajo	K-League	3	0	0	0	12	1	-		15	1
2006	Gwangju Sangmu Bulsajo	K-League	23	0	2	0	11	0	-		36	0
2007	FC Seoul	K-League	1	0	0	0	2	0	-		3	0
2008	FC Seoul	K-League	0	0	0	0	0	0	-		0	0
2009	Gangneung City	Korea National League					-		-			
Total	South Korea		77	4			35	1				
Career total			77	4			35	1				
