= 2012 R League =

R League
- Season: 2012
- Dates: 29 March – 10 September 2012
- Champions: Group A: Korean Police; Group B: Busan IPark
- Top goalscorer: Kim Young-hoo (11 goals)

The 2012 R League was the 14th season of the R League.

== Group A ==
Pos	Team	Pld	W	D	L	GF	GA	GD	Pts
1	Korean Police (C)	15	11	1	3	44	18	+26	34
2	Incheon United	15	11	0	4	38	21	+17	33
3	Seongnam Ilhwa Chunma	15	11	0	4	30	23	+7	33
4	Gangwon FC	15	3	3	9	16	30	–14	12
5	FC Seoul	15	3	3	9	17	32	–15	12
6	Suwon Samsung Bluewings	15	2	1	12	21	44	–23	7

== Group B ==
Pos	Team	Pld	W	D	L	GF	GA	GD	Pts
1	Busan IPark (C)	12	6	5	1	27	12	+15	23
2	Ulsan Hyundai	12	5	3	4	26	20	+6	18
3	Gyeongnam FC	12	5	3	4	25	20	+5	18
4	Sangju Sangmu Phoenix	12	4	2	6	16	30	-14	14
5	Pohang Steelers	12	1	5	6	16	28	–12	8

== See also ==
- 2012 in South Korean football
