= 2009 R League =

R League
- Season: 2009
- Dates: 30 March – 22 October 2009
- Champions: Group A: Incheon United; Group B: Jeonbuk Hyundai Motors; Group C: Pohang Steelers; Championship: Incheon United
- Best Player: Kim Sun-woo
- Top goalscorer: Song Je-heon (8 goals)

The 2009 R League was the eleventh season of the R League.

== Group A ==
Pos	Team	Pld	W	D	L	GF	GA	GD	Pts	Qualification
1	Incheon United (C)	12	6	4	2	19	15	+4	22	Qualification for the Championship
2	Seongnam Ilhwa Chunma	12	7	1	4	17	14	+3	22	Qualification for the Championship
3	Suwon Samsung Bluewings	12	5	2	5	26	15	+11	17	
4	Korean Police	12	3	5	4	12	15	−3	14	
5	FC Seoul	12	1	4	7	11	26	−15	7	

== Group B ==
Pos	Team	Pld	W	D	L	GF	GA	GD	Pts	Qualification
1	Jeonbuk Hyundai Motors (C)	12	7	3	2	19	11	+8	24	Qualification for the Championship
2	Gwangju Sangmu	12	5	3	4	20	15	+5	18	
3	Jeonnam Dragons	12	4	3	5	21	27	−6	15	
4	Daejeon Citizen	12	3	1	8	13	20	−7	10	

== Group C ==
Pos	Team	Pld	W	D	L	GF	GA	GD	Pts	Qualification
1	Pohang Steelers (C)	12	7	3	2	25	17	+8	24	Qualification for the Championship
2	Gyeongnam FC	12	6	1	5	22	18	+4	19	
3	Busan IPark	12	5	2	5	19	15	+4	17	
4	Ulsan Hyundai	12	3	4	5	17	21	−4	13	
5	Daegu FC	12	2	4	6	15	27	−12	10	

== Championship playoffs ==
=== Bracket ===
Semi-finals
8 October – Pohang
Pohang Steelers	1
Seongnam Ilhwa Chunma	2
8 October – Jeonju
Jeonbuk Hyundai Motors	0
Incheon United	4

Final
15, 22 October – Seongnam, Incheon
Seongnam Ilhwa Chunma	0	2	2
Incheon United	1	3	4

=== Semi-finals ===
8 October 2009
14:00 UTC+9

Pohang Steelers	1–2	Seongnam Ilhwa Chunma
Yoo Chang-hyun 51'		Choi Jae-young 11'; Kim Deok-il 88'

Song-ra Stadium, Pohang

8 October 2009
14:00 UTC+9

Jeonbuk Hyundai Motors	0–4	Incheon United
		Veselinović 7'; Lee Sung-jae 35', 54'; Kim Jeong-hyun 90'

Jeonju World Cup Stadium Subground, Jeonju

=== Final ===
15 October 2009
14:00 UTC+9

Seongnam Ilhwa Chunma	0–1	Incheon United
		Lee Sung-jae 86'

Seongnam 1 Stadium, Seongnam

22 October 2009
14:00 UTC+9

Incheon United	3–2	Seongnam Ilhwa Chunma
Yoo Byung-soo 46'; Jeong Hyuk 72'; Kim Jeong-hyun 74'		Kim Deok-il 41'; Choi Jae-young 67'

Incheon Munhak Stadium, Incheon

Incheon United won 4–2 on aggregate.

== See also ==
- 2009 in South Korean football
