= Kim Bong-soo (footballer, born 1970) =

South Korean footballer and coach

Kim Bong-Soo 김봉수
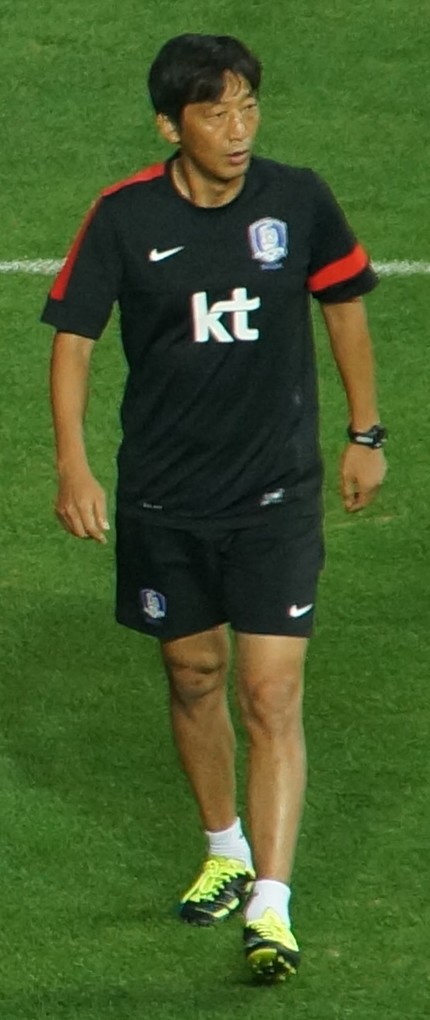
- Kim with South Korea in their friendly match against Haiti in 2013.

Personal information
- Full name: Kim Bong-Soo
- Date of birth: December 4, 1970 (age 55)
- Place of birth: Gunsan, Jeonbuk, South Korea
- Height: 1.87 m (6 ft 2 in)
- Position: Goalkeeper

Youth career
- 1988–1990: Korea University

Senior career*
Years	Team	Apps	(Gls)
1992–1999	LG Cheetahs / Anyang LG Cheetahs	72	(0)
2000	Ulsan Hyundai Horang-i	0	(0)

International career
1987	South Korea U-17	3	(0)
1991–1992	South Korea U-23	4	(0)
1988–1998	South Korea	15	(0)

Managerial career
- 2000: Ulsan Hyundai Horang-i (goalkeeping coach)
- 2001–2004: Yongin Football Center (goalkeeping coach)
- 2005–2009: Jeonnam Dragons (goalkeeping coach)
- 2010–2012: South Korea U23 (goalkeeping coach)
- 2013–2015: South Korea (goalkeeping coach)
- 2019–2020: Suwon Samsung Bluewings (goalkeeping coach)
- 2021–2023: Indonesia U20 (goalkeeping coach)
- 2021–2025: Indonesia U23 (goalkeeping coach)
- 2021–2025: Indonesia (goalkeeping coach)
- * Club domestic league appearances and goals

Kim Bong-Soo (Korean: 김봉수, born December 4, 1970) is a South Korean former footballer and is currently a goalkeeper coach.

== Club career ==
Kim Bong-soo played for FC Seoul then known as LG Cheetahs and Anyang LG Cheetahs, Ulsan Hyundai Horang-i and Chunnam Dragons. Kim was a member of South Korea of 1998 FIFA World Cup qualification.

== Career statistics ==
=== Club ===
Club performance			League		Cup		League Cup		Continental		Total	
Season	Club	League	Apps	Goals	Apps	Goals	Apps	Goals	Apps	Goals	Apps	Goals
South Korea			League		KFA Cup		League Cup		Asia		Total	
1992	LG Cheetahs	K-League	12	0	—		2	0	—		14	0
1993	LG Cheetahs	K-League	6	0	—		1	0	—		7	0
1994	LG Cheetahs	K-League	12	0	—		6	0	—		18	0
1995	LG Cheetahs	K-League	14	0	—		0	0	—		14	0
1996	Anyang LG Cheetahs	K-League	11	0	0	0	1	0	—		12	0
1997	Anyang LG Cheetahs	K-League	3	0	4	0	7	0	—		14	0
1998	Anyang LG Cheetahs	K-League	6	0	0	0	13	0	—		19	0
1999	Anyang LG Cheetahs	K-League	8	0	3	0	4	0	0	0	15	0
2000	Ulsan Hyundai Horang-i	K-League	0	0	0	0	3	0	—		3	0
Total	South Korea		72	0	7	0	37	0	0	0	116	0
Career total			72	0	7	0	37	0	0	0	116	0

=== International clean sheets ===
Results list South Korea's goal tally first.

#	Date	Venue	Opponent	Result	Competition
1	December 11, 1988	Doha	Iran	3–0	1988 AFC Asian Cup
2	June 26, 1989	Seoul	Czech Republic	0–0	1989 President's Cup
3	July 31, 1990	Beijing	China	1–0	1990 Dynasty Cup
4	April 23, 1997	Beijing	China	2–0	Korea-China Annual Match
5	June 1, 1997	Seoul	Thailand	0–0	1998 FIFA World Cup qualification
6	June 14, 1997	Suwon	Ghana	3–0	1997 Korea Cup

Sporting positions
Preceded by Cho Byung-Young	Anyang LG Cheetahs captain 1998	Succeeded by Kang Chun-Ho
