= Weon Jong-teok =

South Korean footballer (born 1977)

Personal information
- Date of birth: August 16, 1977 (age 49)
- Place of birth: Masan, South Gyeongsang, South Korea
- Height: 2.04 m (6 ft 8 1/2 in)
- Position: Goalkeeper

Team information
- Current team: Dongbuk High School FC

Youth career
- 1996–1999: Hongik University

Senior career*
Years	Team	Apps	(Gls)
2000–2007	Anyang LG Cheetahs / FC Seoul	23	(29)
2002–2003	→ Police (military service)	?	(?)

Managerial career
- 2010–2012: FC Seoul U-18 (Youth team goalkeeper coach)
- 2013: Sangju Sangmu FC (Youth team goalkeeper coach)
- 2014: FC Seoul (Goalkeeper coach)
- * Club domestic league appearances and goals as of 27 February 2014 ‡ National team caps and goals as of 27 February 2014

- Weon Jong-teok
- Hangul: 원종덕
- Hanja: 元鍾悳
- RR: Won Jongdeok
- MR: Wŏn Chongdŏk

Weon Jong-teok (born August 16, 1977) is a South Korean football player who played for FC Seoul (formerly Anyang LG Cheetahs). He was goalkeeper coach for FC Seoul Youth team-Dongbuk High School FC.

== Honours ==
=== Player ===
FC Seoul

- K League Winners (1) : 2000
- K League Runners-up (1) : 2001
