= 2011 R League =

R League
- Season: 2011
- Dates: 10 March – 13 October 2011
- Champions: Group A: Seongnam Ilhwa Chunma; Group B: Sangju Sangmu Phoenix
- Matches played: 168
- Goals scored: 484 (2.88 per match)
- Top goalscorer: Jung Sung-min (10 goals)

The 2011 R League was the 13th season of the R League.

== Group A ==
Pos	Team	Pld	W	D	L	GF	GA	GD	Pts
1	Seongnam Ilhwa Chunma (C)	21	12	8	1	44	16	+28	44
2	Korean Police	21	12	3	6	39	29	+10	39
3	Incheon United	21	9	7	5	24	16	+8	34
4	Gangwon FC	21	9	6	6	31	27	+4	33
5	FC Seoul	21	8	4	9	33	29	+4	28
6	Suwon Samsung Bluewings	21	5	9	7	32	36	–4	24
7	Daejeon Citizen	21	5	3	13	23	45	–22	18
8	Jeonbuk Hyundai Motors	21	2	4	15	10	38	–28	10

== Group B ==
Pos	Team	Pld	W	D	L	GF	GA	GD	Pts
1	Sangju Sangmu Phoenix (C)	21	11	4	6	33	32	+1	37
2	Pohang Steelers	21	11	3	7	38	27	+11	36
3	Gyeongnam FC	21	9	6	6	33	26	+7	33
4	Jeonnam Dragons	21	8	8	5	24	22	+2	32
5	Daegu FC	21	8	5	8	26	26	0	29
6	Ulsan Hyundai	21	8	4	9	35	32	+3	28
7	Jeju United	21	4	7	10	29	37	–8	19
8	Busan IPark	21	4	5	12	30	46	–16	17

== See also ==
- 2011 in South Korean football
