= Song Sun-ho =

South Korean footballer and manager

Personal information
- Full name: Song Sun-ho
- Date of birth: 24 January 1966 (age 60)
- Place of birth: South Korea
- Height: 1.84 m (6 ft 1/2 in)
- Position: Defender

Team information
- Current team: Bucheon FC

Youth career
- 1984–1987: University of Incheon

Senior career*
Years	Team	Apps	(Gls)
1988–1996	Yukong Elephants	146	(4)

Managerial career
- 2008–2009: Jeju United (reserves)
- 2015–2016: Bucheon FC
- 2017: Asan Mugunghwa
- 2019–: Bucheon FC
- * Club domestic league appearances and goals

Song Sun-ho (Korean: 송선호; born 24 January 1966) is a South Korean former footballer and current manager of Bucheon FC. He played as defender.

== Career ==
He was appointed as an interim manager of Bucheon FC on 29 May 2015. He was promoted to full-time manager on 3 October 2015.
