= 2010 R League =

R League
- Season: 2010
- Dates: 25 March – 7 October 2010
- Champions: Group A: FC Seoul; Group B: Pohang Steelers
- Matches played: 112
- Goals scored: 350 (3.13 per match)
- Top goalscorer: Eraldo Anício Gomes (7 goals)

The 2010 R League was the twelfth season of the R League.

== Group A ==
Pos	Team	Pld	W	D	L	GF	GA	GD	Pts
1	FC Seoul (C)	14	10	3	1	32	10	+22	33
2	Seongnam Ilhwa Chunma	14	9	3	2	29	12	+17	30
3	Suwon Samsung Bluewings	14	6	2	6	19	19	0	20
4	Jeonbuk Hyundai Motors	14	5	3	6	25	26	–1	18
5	Gangwon FC	14	5	3	6	30	37	–7	18
6	Incheon United	14	3	5	6	16	23	–7	14
7	Korean Police	14	3	5	6	15	22	–7	14
8	Daejeon Citizen	14	3	0	11	12	29	–17	9

== Group B ==
Pos	Team	Pld	W	D	L	GF	GA	GD	Pts
1	Pohang Steelers (C)	14	8	5	1	23	12	+11	29
2	Gyeongnam FC	14	8	3	3	29	12	+17	27
3	Ulsan Hyundai	14	7	6	1	26	16	+10	27
4	Gwangju Sangmu	14	6	2	6	23	24	–1	20
5	Jeju United	14	4	6	4	23	24	–1	18
6	Jeonnam Dragons	14	3	4	7	20	27	–7	13
7	Busan IPark	14	2	6	6	14	25	–11	12
8	Daegu FC	14	1	2	11	14	32	–18	5

== See also ==
- 2010 in South Korean football
