= Kim Eun-hu =

South Korean footballer (born 1990)

Kim Eun-Hu
Personal information
- Date of birth: 23 May 1990 (age 36)
- Place of birth: South Korea
- Height: 1.74 m (5 ft 8 1/2 in)
- Position: Midfielder

Team information
- Current team: Mokpo City
- Number: 10

Senior career*
Years	Team	Apps	(Gls)
2009	FC Seoul	6	(0)
2010	Jeonbuk Hyundai Motors	10	(1)
2011–2012	Gangwon FC	34	(2)
2012–	Mokpo City		

International career^{‡}
2006–2007	South Korea U-17	6	(0)
2009	South Korea U-20	4	(0)
2011	South Korea U-23	4	(0)
- * Club domestic league appearances and goals as of 12 July 2012 ‡ National team caps and goals as of 1 June 2011

Kim Eun-Hu (Korean: 김은후; born 23 May 1990) is a South Korean footballer who plays as midfielder who currently plays for Mokpo City. He changed the name from "Kim Eui-Bum" to "Kim Eun-Hu".

== Honors ==
Individual

- K-League Reserve League Top assistor : 2010

== Career statistics ==
As of 12 July 2012

Club performance			League		Cup		League Cup		Total	
Season	Club	League	Apps	Goals	Apps	Goals	Apps	Goals	Apps	Goals
South Korea			League		KFA Cup		League Cup		Total	
2009	FC Seoul	K-League	6	0	0	0	0	0	6	0
2010	Jeonbuk Hyundai Motors	K-League	6	0	3	1	1	0	10	1
2011	Gangwon FC	K-League	10	1	3	0	3	0	16	0
2012	Gangwon FC	K-League	15	1	3	0	-		0	0
Career total			37	2	9	1	4	0	50	3
