= 2006 R League =

Reserve League
- Season: 2006
- Dates: 30 March – 26 October 2006
- Champions: Group A: FC Seoul; Group B: Incheon United; Group C: Jeonnam Dragons; Championship: Incheon United
- Best Player: Lee Keun-ho
- Top goalscorer: Song Geun-su (11 goals)

The 2006 Korean Professional Football Reserve League was the eighth season of the R League. Incheon United won the national title for the first time after defeating Busan IPark in the Championship final.

== Group A ==
Pos	Team	Pld	W	D	L	GF	GA	GD	Pts	Qualification
1	FC Seoul (C)	18	8	3	7	31	27	+4	27	Qualification for the Championship
2	Jeju United	18	7	5	6	20	24	−4	26	
3	Seongnam Ilhwa Chunma	18	6	6	6	20	17	+3	24	
4	Gwangju Sangmu	18	6	4	8	23	26	−3	22	

== Group B ==
Pos	Team	Pld	W	D	L	GF	GA	GD	Pts	Qualification
1	Incheon United (C)	18	9	4	5	30	21	+9	31	Qualification for the Championship
2	Korean Police	18	8	3	7	32	33	−1	27	
3	Jeonbuk Hyundai Motors	18	7	3	8	31	31	0	24	
4	Suwon Samsung Bluewings	18	5	4	9	26	34	−8	19	

== Group C ==
Pos	Team	Pld	W	D	L	GF	GA	GD	Pts	Qualification
1	Jeonnam Dragons (C)	18	9	4	5	31	20	+11	31	Qualification for the Championship (Note: Busan IPark was given the qualification for the Championship by earning the most points among group runners-up.)
2	Busan IPark	18	8	4	6	28	28	0	28	Qualification for the Championship
3	Ulsan Hyundai Horang-i	18	6	5	7	21	27	−6	23	
4	Pohang Steelers	18	5	3	10	21	26	−5	18	

== Championship playoffs ==
Semi-finals
12 October – Gwangyang
Jeonnam Dragons	1
Busan IPark	2
12 October – Incheon
Incheon United	2
FC Seoul	1

Final
19, 26 October – Busan, Incheon
Busan IPark	0	0	0
Incheon United	1	1	2

=== Semi-finals ===
12 October 2006
14:00 UTC+9

Jeonnam Dragons	1–2	Busan IPark
Baek Jin-chul 6'		Oh Chul-suk 3'; Cho Jae-hyun 87'

Gwang-Yang Sub Stadium, Gwangyang

12 October 2006
14:00 UTC+9

Incheon United	2–1	FC Seoul
Radončić 61'; Lee Jun-young 80'		Sim Woo-yeon 86'

Munhak Sub Stadium, Incheon

=== Final ===
19 October 2006
14:00 UTC+9

Busan IPark	0–1	Incheon United
		Bang Seung-hwan 42' (pen.)

Busan Gudeok Stadium, Busan

26 October 2006
14:00 UTC+9

Incheon United	1–0	Busan IPark
Park Seung-min 13'

Incheon Munhak Stadium, Incheon

Incheon United won 2–0 on aggregate.

== See also ==
- 2006 in South Korean football
