= Krunoslav Lovrek =

Croatian footballer (born 1979)

Personal information
- Date of birth: 11 September 1979 (age 47)
- Place of birth: Varaždin, SFR Yugoslavia
- Height: 1.82 m (6 ft 0 in)
- Position: Forward

Youth career
- NK Zagreb

Senior career*
Years	Team	Apps	(Gls)
1998–2003	NK Zagreb	124	(28)
2004	Cerezo Osaka	5	(0)
2004–2005	Hajduk Split	13	(2)
2005–2006	Lierse	7	(0)
2006	Croatia Sesvete	3	(0)
2006–2008	NK Zagreb	47	(32)
2008–2009	Eskişehirspor	12	(2)
2010–2011	Jeonbuk Hyundai	49	(11)
2012	Qingdao Jonoon	6	(0)
2012–2013	Sydney FC	5	(0)
2013	NK Sesvete	13	(2)
2015	Tehničar Cvetkovec		
2016	USV Dechantskirchen	11	(7)
2016–2022	Tehničar Cvetkovec		

International career
1998	Croatia U19	4	(1)
1998–1999	Croatia U20	5	(0)
1999–2000	Croatia U21	3	(0)
- * Club domestic league appearances and goals

Krunoslav Lovrek (Croatian pronunciation: [krǔnoslaʋ lǒʋrek]; born 11 September 1979), also known as Kruno Lovrek [krǔːno-], is a Croatian former professional footballer who played as a forward.

== Club career ==
On 5 July 2012, it was announced that Lovrek had signed a one-year deal with Sydney FC for the 2012–13 A-League season and joined his new teammates for the first time in pre-season training on 23 July 2012. However, as a result of Sydney FC failing to qualify for the A-League finals, Lovrek, along with teammates Paul Reid, Nathan Sherlock, Trent McClenahan, Adam Griffiths and Jarrod Kyle were released by Sydney FC at the conclusion of the 2012–13 A-League season.

He later had a spell at Austrian amateur side USV Dechantskirchen.

== Career statistics ==
Appearances and goals by club, season and competition
Club	Season	League		
Club	Season	Division	Apps	Goals
Zagreb	1998–2004	Prva HNL	124	28
Cerezo Osaka	2004	J1 League	5	0
Hajduk Split	2004–05	Prva HNL	13	2
Lierse	2005–06	First Division	7	0
Croatia Sesvete	2005–06	Druga HNL	0	0
Zagreb	2006–08	Prva HNL	47	32
Eskişehirspor	2008–10	Süper Lig	12	2
Jeonbuk Hyundai Motors	2010–11	K-League	49	11
Qingdao Jonoon	2011–12	Chinese Super League	6	0
Sydney FC	2012–13	A-League	5	0
NK Sesvete	2013–	Druga HNL	13	2
