= 2008 R League =

Reserve League
- Season: 2008
- Champions: Group A: Seongnam Ilhwa Chunma; Group B: Gyeongnam FC; Championship: Incheon United
- Best player: Kang Soo-il
- Top goalscorer: Yoo Chang-hyun (13 goals)

The 2008 Korean Professional Football Reserve League was the tenth season of the R League. Incheon United won the national title after defeating Pohang Steelers in the Championship final.

== Group A ==
Pos	Team	Pld	W	D	L	GF	GA	GD	Pts	Qualification
1	Seongnam Ilhwa Chunma (C)	18	13	3	2	34	20	+14	42	Qualification for the Championship
2	Incheon United	18	11	0	7	35	23	+12	33	Qualification for the Championship
3	Jeonbuk Hyundai Motors	18	10	2	6	34	24	+10	32	
4	Daejeon Citizen	18	6	4	8	30	32	−2	22	
5	FC Seoul	18	6	4	8	30	37	−7	22	
6	Suwon Samsung Bluewings	18	4	3	11	23	37	−14	15	
7	Korean Police	18	3	4	11	20	33	−13	13	

== Group B ==
Pos	Team	Pld	W	D	L	GF	GA	GD	Pts	Qualification
1	Gyeongnam FC (C)	21	13	4	4	38	23	+15	43	Qualification for the Championship
2	Pohang Steelers	21	13	2	6	45	32	+13	41	Qualification for the Championship
3	Busan IPark	21	11	2	8	27	23	+4	35	
4	Jeonnam Dragons	21	10	3	8	36	23	+13	33	
5	Jeju United	21	9	6	6	23	21	+2	33	
6	Gwangju Sangmu	21	9	4	8	29	29	0	31	
7	Daegu FC	21	3	3	15	16	42	−26	12	
8	Ulsan Hyundai	21	1	6	14	13	34	−21	9	

== Championship playoffs ==
Semi-finals
2 October – Seongnam
Seongnam Ilhwa Chunma	1 (2)
Pohang Steelers (p)	1 (4)
2 October – Haman
Gyeongnam FC	1
Incheon United	3

Final
16, 23 October – Pohang, Incheon
Pohang Steelers	0	2	2
Incheon United	1	3	4

=== Semi-finals ===
2 October 2007
14:00 UTC+9

Seongnam Ilhwa Chunma	1–1 (a.e.t.)	Pohang Steelers
Kim Yeon-keon 41'		Yoo Chang-hyun 79'
Penalties
	2–4

Seongnam 1 Stadium, Seongnam

2 October 2007
14:00 UTC+9

Gyeongnam FC	1–3	Incheon United
Jung Yoon-sung 20'		Park Jae-hyun 4', 7'; Kang Soo-il 90'

Haman Stadium, Haman

=== Final ===
16 October 2007
14:00 UTC+9

Pohang Steelers	0–1	Incheon United
		Seo Min-gook 56' (pen.)

Steelyard Stadium, Pohang

23 October 2007
14:00 UTC+9

Incheon United	3–2	Pohang Steelers
Ahn Jae-gon 39'; Veselinović 90'; Kang Soo-il 90+1'		Lee Gwang-jae 53', 65'

Incheon Munhak Stadium, Incheon

Incheon United won 4–2 on aggregate.

== See also ==
- 2008 in South Korean football
