= LG Champion's Park =

Korean sports facility

Icheon LG Champion's Park 이천 LG 챔피언스 파크
- Interactive map of Icheon LG Champion's Park 이천 LG 챔피언스 파크
- Location: 393 Bupil-ri, Daewol-myeon, Icheon, Gyeongi-do, South Korea
- Coordinates: 37°13′46.2″N 127°30′23.4″E
- Owner: LG Group
- Operator: LG Sports
- Capacity: 852
- Surface: Natural grass

Construction
- Groundbreaking: March 2013
- Opened: 22 September 2014
- Cost: 100 billion won

Tenants
- LG Twins (KBO Futures); Changwon LG Sakers

LG Champion's Park is a multi-purpose sports facility in Icheon, South Korea. The venue is used by the farm team of the LG Twins and by the KBL team Changwon LG Sakers.

== See also ==
- GS Champions Park
