= Park Jung-suk (footballer) =

South Korean footballer (born 1977)

Park Jung-Suk
Personal information
- Date of birth: April 19, 1977 (age 49)
- Place of birth: Seoul, South Korea
- Position: Defender

Youth career
- Dongbuk High School

Senior career*
Years	Team	Apps	(Gls)
1996–2000	Suwon Samsung Bluewings		
1999–2000	→ CS Juventus București (loan)	2	(0)
2000	→ FC Remscheid (loan)	8	(0)
2001–2007	Anyang LG Cheetahs / FC Seoul	80	(1)
- * Club domestic league appearances and goals

Park Jung-Suk (born April 19, 1977) is a South Korean former professional football player who played as a defender for Suwon Samsung Bluewings, FC Seoul, CS Juventus București and FC Remscheid.
