= Sung Jong-hyun =

South Korean footballer (born 1979)

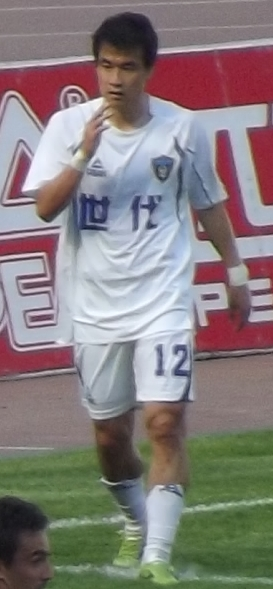

Personal information
- Date of birth: April 2, 1979 (age 47)
- Height: 1.74 m (5 ft 9 in)
- Position: Defender

Senior career*
Years	Team	Apps	(Gls)
2004–2010	Jeonbuk Hyundai Motors	18	(1)
2006–2007	→ Gwangju Sangmu (army)	6	(0)
2011	Shenyang Dongjin	13	(0)
2012	Goyang KB Kookmin Bank	15	(0)
- * Club domestic league appearances and goals

- Sung Jong-hyun
- Hangul: 성종현
- Hanja: 成宗鉉
- RR: Seong Jonghyeon
- MR: Sŏng Chonghyŏn

Sung Jong-hyun (born April 2, 1979) is a South Korean retired football player. He formerly played for Jeonbuk Hyundai Motors, Gwangju Sangmu Bulsajo, Shenyang Dongjin and Goyang KB Kookmin Bank FC.

Sung transferred to Shenyang Dongjin in January 2011.
