= Valentim (footballer) =

Brazilian footballer (born 1977)

Personal information
- Full name: Francisco de Assis Clarentino Valentim
- Date of birth: 20 June 1977 (age 49)
- Place of birth: Brazil
- Height: 1.79 m (5 ft 10 in)
- Position: Midfielder

Senior career*
Years	Team	Apps	(Gls)
1994–2000	Rio Branco	?	(?)
1999	→ Campinense (loan)	?	(?)
2000	→ Castanhal (loan)	?	(?)
2001–2002	Paysandu	?	(?)
2003	Paraná	?	(?)
2004	FC Seoul	5	(0)
2004	Flamengo	?	(?)
2005–2006	Juventude	?	(?)
2006	→ Toledo (loan)	?	(?)
2007	Fortaleza	?	(?)
2007	Joinville	?	(?)
- * Club domestic league appearances and goals as of 15 August 2011

Francisco de Assis Clarentino Valentim, shortly Valentim (born 20 June 1977) is a Brazilian footballer, who played as a midfielder.

== Career ==
He played South Korean side FC Seoul in 2004.
