= 2007 R League =

Reserve League
- Season: 2007
- Dates: 30 March – 18 October 2007
- Champions: Group A: Seongnam Ilhwa Chunma; Group B: Jeju United; Group C: Pohang Steelers; Championship: Pohang Steelers
- Best player: Lee Won-jae
- Top goalscorer: Yoon Joon-su; Song Geun-su (8 goals each)

The 2007 Korean Professional Football Reserve League was the ninth season of the R League. Pohang Steelers won their second national title after defeating Seongnam Ilhwa Chunma in the Championship final.

== Group A ==
Pos	Team	Pld	W	D	L	GF	GA	GD	Pts	Qualification
1	Seongnam Ilhwa Chunma (C)	16	8	2	6	19	14	+5	26	Qualification for the Championship
2	Suwon Samsung Bluewings	16	7	5	4	26	23	+3	26	Qualification for the Championship
3	Incheon United	16	5	5	6	18	19	−1	20	
4	Korean Police	16	5	4	7	18	22	−4	19	
5	FC Seoul	16	4	6	6	17	20	−3	18	

== Group B ==
Pos	Team	Pld	W	D	L	GF	GA	GD	Pts	Qualification
1	Jeju United (C)	18	7	5	6	21	17	+4	26	Qualification for the Championship
2	Jeonbuk Hyundai Motors	18	8	2	8	30	34	−4	26	
3	Gwangju Sangmu	18	7	4	7	28	25	+3	25	
4	Jeonnam Dragons	18	7	3	8	26	29	−3	24	

== Group C ==
Pos	Team	Pld	W	D	L	GF	GA	GD	Pts	Qualification
1	Pohang Steelers (C)	18	9	5	4	31	13	+18	32	Qualification for the Championship
2	Busan IPark	18	7	6	5	21	19	+2	27	
3	Ulsan Hyundai Horang-i	18	4	7	7	17	24	−7	19	
4	Gyeongnam FC	18	5	4	9	15	28	−13	19	

== Championship playoffs ==
Semi-finals
4 October – Anyang
Seongnam Ilhwa Chunma	3
Jeju United	1
4 October – Pohang
Pohang Steelers	4
Suwon Samsung Bluewings	0

Final
11, 18 October – Seongnam, Pohang
Seongnam Ilhwa Chunma	2	1	3 (2)
Pohang Steelers (p)	1	2	3 (4)

=== Semi-finals ===
4 October 2007
14:00 UTC+9

Seongnam Ilhwa Chunma	3–1	Jeju United
Do Jae-jun 39'; Sin Young-chul 62'; Park Jae-yong 69'	Report	Cho Hyun-jae 67'

Anyang Stadium, Anyang

4 October 2007
14:00 UTC+9

Pohang Steelers	4–0	Suwon Samsung Bluewings
Ko Ki-gu 13'; Kim Gwang-seok 36'; Go Seul-ki 57'; Choi Tae-uk 74'	Report

Pohang Songra Stadium, Pohang

=== Final ===
11 October 2007
14:00 UTC+9

Seongnam Ilhwa Chunma	2–1	Pohang Steelers
Cho Yong-hyung 29'; Do Jae-jun 42'	Report	Lee Sung-jae 67'

Seongnam 1 Stadium, Seongnam

18 October 2007
14:00 UTC+9

Pohang Steelers	2–1 (a.e.t.)	Seongnam Ilhwa Chunma
Choi Tae-uk 39'; Lee Sung-jae 96' (pen.)	Report	Kim Yeon-keon 111'
Penalties
Lee Sung-jae (penalty scored); Kim Yoon-sik (penalty scored); Kim Myung-joong (penalty scored); Lee Chang-won (penalty missed); Oh Seung-bum (penalty scored)	4–2	(penalty scored) Sin Young-chul; (penalty scored) Sin Dong-geun; (penalty missed) Park Gwang-min; (penalty missed) Park Jae-yong

Steelyard Stadium, Pohang

3–3 on aggregate. Pohang Steelers won 4–2 on penalties.

== See also ==
- 2007 in South Korean football
