= Back Young-chul =

South Korean footballer (born 1978)

Personal information
- Date of birth: 11 November 1978 (age 47)
- Place of birth: South Korea
- Height: 1.77 m (5 ft 10 in)
- Position: Midfielder

Team information
- Current team: Daegu FC U-15 (Coach)

Youth career
- Kyunghee University

Senior career*
Years	Team	Apps	(Gls)
2001–2004	Seongnam Ilhwa Chunma	36	(2)
2005	Pohang Steelers	12	(0)
2006–2007	Gyeongnam FC	26	(0)
2008–2010	Daegu FC	47	(1)
Total		121	(3)

International career
1996	South Korea U-20		

Managerial career
- 2011–: Daegu FC U-15 (Coach)
- * Club domestic league appearances and goals as of 13 January 2011

- Back Young-chul
- Hangul: 백영철
- Hanja: 白榮喆
- RR: Baek Yeongcheol
- MR: Paek Yŏngch'ŏl

Back Young-chul (Korean: 백영철; born 11 November 1978) is a South Korean former football midfielder, who currently is the Coach of Daegu FC's U-15 team.

== Club career ==
Back made his professional debut for Seongnam Ilhwa Chunma in 2001, playing a number of games in 2001 and 2002. However, he saw less game time in the next two seasons, and transferred to Pohang Steelers for 2005. He played two seasons for Gyeongnam FC from 2006, before joining his current club, Daegu FC in 2008. After regular appearances during the 2008 and 2009 seasons, Back had limited game time during the 2010 season. Following the conclusion of the 2010 season, he retired from playing football. However, he remains with Daegu as the coach of their U-15 side.

== International career ==
Back was a member of the South Korea U-20 side in 1996, but has not played at senior level for South Korea.

== Club career statistics ==
Club performance			League		Cup		League Cup		Continental		Total	
Season	Club	League	Apps	Goals	Apps	Goals	Apps	Goals	Apps	Goals	Apps	Goals
South Korea			League		KFA Cup		League Cup		Asia		Total	
2001	Seongnam Ilhwa Chunma	K League	11	2	?	?	0	0	?	?		
2002	Seongnam Ilhwa Chunma	K League	18	0	?	?	0	0	?	?		
2003	Seongnam Ilhwa Chunma	K League	1	0	0	0	—		?	?		
2004	Seongnam Ilhwa Chunma	K League	6	0	1	0	1	0	?	?		
2005	Pohang Steelers	K League	12	0	3	0	10	0	—		25	0
2006	Gyeongnam FC	K League	11	0	2	0	10	1	—		23	1
2007	Gyeongnam FC	K League	15	0	2	0	1	0	—		18	0
2008	Daegu FC	K League	21	0	3	0	7	0	—		31	0
2009	Daegu FC	K League	21	1	2	0	4	0	—		27	1
2010	Daegu FC	K League	5	0	0	0	3	0	—		8	0
Career total			121	3			36	1				
