= Lee Boo-yeol =

South Korean footballer (born 1958)

Personal information
- Full name: 16 October 1958 (age 68)
- Place of birth: South Korea
- Position: Midfielder

Youth career
- Masan Technical High School

Senior career*
Years	Team	Apps	(Gls)
1983–1984	Kookmin Bank FC	43	(4)
1985–1988	Lucky Goldstar Hwangso	51	(2)

International career
1984	South Korea	4	(0)
- * Club domestic league appearances and goals

- Lee Boo-yeol
- Hangul: 이부열
- Hanja: 李富烈
- RR: I Buyeol
- MR: I Puyŏl

Lee Boo-yeol (born October 16, 1958) is a Korean football midfielder who played for South Korea in the 1984 Asian Cup. He also played for Kookmin Bank FC and Lucky Goldstar Hwangso.

== International records ==
Year	Apps	Goal
1984	4	0
Total	4	0
