= GS Champions Park =

Football training center in Guri, South Korea

Coordinates: 37.56748°N 127.11923°E

GS Champions Park GS챔피언스파크
- Interactive map of GS Champions Park; GS챔피언스파크
- Location: Guri, South Korea
- Owner: City of Guri
- Operator: FC Seoul
- Surface: Grass

Tenant
- FC Seoul (1989–present)

The GS Champions Park is the training center of FC Seoul. It is located in Guri, east of nearby Seoul.

In 1983, it was built by GS Sports, then known as Lucky-Goldstar Sports. It has been used by FC Seoul since 1989. France national football team used the venue as the training camp during the 2002 FIFA World Cup. Today, it is used by the FC Seoul's first team, and FC Seoul Reserves and Academy.

== History ==
| Year | |
|---|---|
| 1983 | Established by the Lucky-Goldstar Sports. |
| 1987–1988 | Four natural turf football pitches were completed (currently LG Champion's Park). |
| 1990 | One football pitch was transformed into the baseball pitch for the LG Twins. |
| 2001 | An additional natural turf pitch was built, while the existing pitch was replaced by the artificial turf pitch. |
| 2002 | A new indoor facility, including weight room, treatment room, and meeting room, was built. France national football team used it as the team's training camp during the 2002 FIFA World Cup. |
| 2004 | Replaced with cool season grasses in A-Pitch. |

== See also ==
- FC Seoul
- LG Champions Park
