= Lee Young-ik =

South Korean assistant coach (born 1966)

Lee Young-Ik
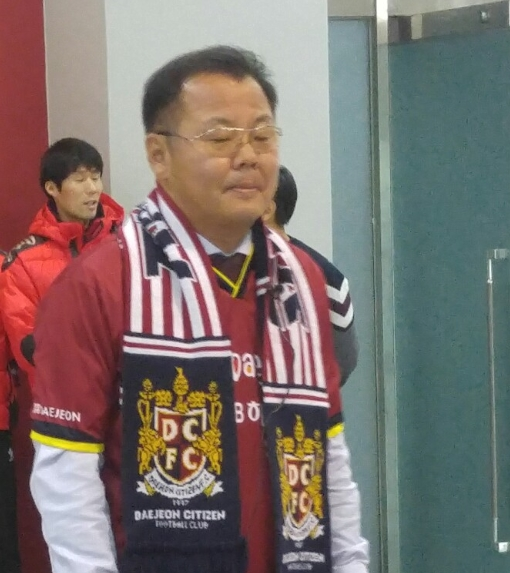

Personal information
- Full name: Lee Young-Ik
- Date of birth: August 30, 1966 (age 60)
- Place of birth: South Korea
- Height: 1.80 m (5 ft 11 in)
- Position: Defender

Youth career
- 1985–1988: Korea University

Senior career*
Years	Team	Apps	(Gls)
1989–1997	Lucky-Goldstar Hwangso; LG Cheetahs; Anyang LG Cheetahs	161	(5)

International career
1990–1996	South Korea	4	(0)

Managerial career
- 1998–2002: Ulsan Hyundai Mipo Dockyard (Coach)
- 2003–2007: Daejeon Citizen (Coach)
- 2007–2009: FC Seoul U-18 (Coach)
- 2010–2012: FC Seoul U-18
- 2013–2015: Sangju Sangmu (Coach)
- 2016: Gyeongnam FC (Coach)
- 2017: Daejeon Citizen
- 2023–2024: Yunnan Jin Dal Lae
- * Club domestic league appearances and goals

Lee Young-ik is a South Korean football manager or assistant coach. He graduated in Korea University, and played for LG Cheetahs. He was honoured as "K-League Best XI" on 1989. After retiring, he stood for Ulsan Hyundai Mipo Dockyard as a coach. On 2003, he moved to Daejeon Citizen and he has been one of Daejeon staff since then.

== Honours ==
=== Player ===
Lucky-Goldstar Hwangso / LG Cheetahs / Anyang LG Cheetahs

- K League 1 Winners (1) : 1990
- K League 1 Runners-up (1) : 1989
- League Cup Runners-up (1) 1994

=== Individual ===
- K-League Best XI (1) : 1989

== Club career statistics ==
Club performance			League		Cup		League Cup		Continental		Total	
Season	Club	League	Apps	Goals	Apps	Goals	Apps	Goals	Apps	Goals	Apps	Goals
South Korea			League		KFA Cup		League Cup		Asia		Total	
1989	Lucky-Goldstar Hwangso	K League 1	39	3	-		-		-		39	3
1990	Lucky-Goldstar Hwangso	K League 1	26	1	-		-		-		26	1
1991	LG Cheetahs	K League 1	17	0	-		-		-		17	0
1992	LG Cheetahs	K League 1	5	0	-		4	1	-		9	1
1993	LG Cheetahs	K League 1	28	1	-		5	0	-		33	1
1994	LG Cheetahs	K League 1	2	0	-		0	0	-		2	0
1995	LG Cheetahs	K League 1	26	0	-		6	0	-		32	0
1996	Anyang LG Cheetahs	K League 1	16	0	?	?	5	0	-			
1997	Anyang LG Cheetahs	K League 1	2	0	?	?	9	0	-			
Total	South Korea		161	5			29	1	-			
Career total			161	5			29	1				

== Coach & Manager career ==
- 1998-2002: Ulsan Hyundai Mipo Dockyard
- 2003-2007: Daejeon Citizen

Sporting positions
Preceded by Yoon Sang-Chul	LG Cheetahs / Anyang LG Cheetahs captain 1995.08–1996	Succeeded by Cho Byung-Young
