= Andong National University =

Public university in South Korea

- Motto: Jil-ri, Seong-shil, Chang-jo (Truth, Sincerity, Creativity)
- Type: Public
- Established: 1947
- President: Kwon Tae Hwan (7th)
- Faculty: 720
- Administrative staff: 157
- Students: 7318
- Undergraduates: 6564
- Postgraduates: 666
- Location: Andong, North Gyeongsang Province, South Korea; 36.54157°N 128.79642°E
- Website: https://eng.andong.ac.kr/

- Andong National University
- Hangul: 안동대학교
- Hanja: 安東大學校
- RR: Andong daehakgyo
- MR: Andong taehakkyo

Andong National University is a government-operated university in Andong, South Korea. It enrolls roughly 6500 students. It contains undergraduate colleges of Humanities, Social Sciences, Education, Natural Sciences, Engineering, Human Ecology, and Arts and Physical Education, as well as graduate schools of Education, Management, and General Studies. The undergraduate students of March 2006 numbered 10,274, representing a steady upward trend in recent years, according to the school website .

== History ==
The university was established as Andong Normal School in 1947. Briefly reorganized as Andong Provincial Agricultural Junior College in 1962, it was reorganized again as Andong College of Education in 1965. Management was transferred to the national university system in the school's redesignation as Andong National Junior College in 1978. Its status was raised to Andong National College the following year. The graduate school was established in 1988. The school gained its present title, Andong National University, in 1991.

== Dormitories ==
There are three dormitories on campus. There is one co-ed dormitory, one for men, and one for women. The co-ed dormitory is the newest building. The co-ed dorm has double rooms. The all-women dormitory has 4 people per room. The all-male dorm has one room with two people.

== Language Center ==
Andong National University Language Center was built to promote the language ability of ANU students. With the assistance of the specialized language facilities, it provides various language programs, special language lectures, and camp programs. It also publishes its own journal, offers translation services, and supports many other academic activities related to foreign language development.

== See also ==
- List of national universities in South Korea
- List of universities and colleges in South Korea
- Education in Korea
