= Kim Dong-hae =

South Korean footballer (born 1966)

Kim Dong-Hae 김동해
Personal information
- Full name: Kim Dong-Hae
- Date of birth: March 16, 1966 (age 60)
- Place of birth: South Korea
- Height: 1.78 m (5 ft 10 in)
- Position: Midfielder

Youth career
- Hanyang University

Senior career*
Years	Team	Apps	(Gls)
1989–1995	Lucky-Goldstar Hwangso / LG Cheetahs	108	(8)
1991–1992	→ Sagnmu FC (Military service)	?	(?)
1996	Suwon Samsung Bluewings	8	(0)

International career^{‡}
1986–1988	South Korea Olympic		
- * Club domestic league appearances and goals as of 17 August 2011 ‡ National team caps and goals as of 17 August 2011

Kim Dong-Hae (born March 16, 1966) is a South Korean footballer.

He graduated in Hanyang University, and played for LG Cheetahs and Suwon Samsung Bluewings.

== Club career ==
- 1989-1995 Luckey-Goldstar Hwangso /LG Cheetahs
- 1991-1992 Sagnmu FC (semi-professional)
- 1996 Suwon Samsung Bluewings

== Honours ==
=== Player ===
- Lucky-Goldstar Hwangso
- K-League Winners (1) : 1990
