= Asan Mugunghwa FC =

1996–2019 South Korean football club

- Full name: Asan Mugunghwa Football Club
- Short name: AMFC
- Founded: 1996; 30 years ago (as Police FC); 2014; 12 years ago (as Ansan Police FC); 2017; 9 years ago (as Asan Mugunghwa FC)
- Dissolved: 2019; 7 years ago
- Ground: Yi Sun-sin Stadium
- Capacity: 17,376
- Owner(s): Asan Government and Korean Police Agency
- Chairman: Mayor of Asan
- Manager: Park Dong-hyuk
- League: K League 2
- 2019: K League 2, 7th
Home colours	Away colours

Asan Mugunghwa Football Club (Korean: 아산 무궁화 프로축구단) was a South Korean football club based in Asan. The club's players were South Korean professional footballers who were serving their mandatory two-year military duty.

== History ==
=== Founding and Police FC era ===
Founded as National Police Department FC in 1961, the club changed its name to Seoul Police Department FC in 1962 then back to its original name in 1967. During its history, it won a number of competitions such as the Korean President's Cup National Football Tournament and the Korea Semi-Professional Football League in the 1960s before being dissolved in November 1967. The club was reinstated in 1996, and it partly consisted of players serving their compulsory two-year military duty, similar to the other military club, Sangju Sangmu.

=== Professionalization and Ansan era (2013–2016) ===
In 2013, Police FC joined the K League Challenge.

In February 2014, Police FC was based in Ansan (Ansan Wa~ Stadium) and renamed as Ansan Police FC.

In January 2016, the club's name was changed to Ansan Mugunghwa FC. Mugunghwa is the Korean word for the flowering plant hibiscus syriacus, which is South Korea's national flower, a profound cultural emblem and a symbol of the Korean Police.

=== Asan era (2017–2019) ===
After the 2016 season, Ansan Mugunghwa moved to the unrelated Asan, becoming Asan Mugunghwa FC. Per K League policies, the new team did not take over the records and history of the previous one and was registered as a different team. Asan Mugunghwa were disbanded in 2019 to make way for another team, Chungnam Asan FC, which have no ties to the police at all.

=== Club name history ===
- 1996–2013: Police FC
- 2014–2015: Ansan Police FC
- 2016: Ansan Mugunghwa FC
- 2017–2019: Asan Mugunghwa FC

== Honours ==
=== Asan Mugunghwa (2017–2019) ===
- K League 2
  - Winners (1): 2018

=== Ansan Mugunghwa (2014–2016) ===
- K League Challenge
  - Winners (1): 2016

=== Police FC (1996–2013) ===
- K League Challenge
  - Runners-up (1): 2013
- National Semi-Professional Football League
  - Winners (1): 2002 Fall

== Managers ==
No.	Name	From	To	Season(s)
1	(South Korea) Yu Dong-chun	1996/03/29	2001/03/07	1996–2000
2	(South Korea) Kim Ki-bok	2001/03/07	?	2001–2005
3	(South Korea) Park Dae-je	2005/11/03	?	2006–2010
4	(South Korea) Cho Dong-hyun	2010/10/12	2015/01/13	2011–2014
5	(South Korea) Lee Heung-sil	2015/01/13	2016/10/31	2015–2016
6	(South Korea) Song Sun-ho	2016/12/08	2017/11/29	2017
7	(South Korea) Park Dong-hyuk	2017/11/29	2019/12/31	2018–2019
