= 2016 FC Seoul season =

FC Seoul
2016 season
- Chairman: Huh Chang-soo
- Manager: Choi Yong-soo (until 22 June); Hwang Sun-hong (since 27 June)
- K League Classic: Champions
- FA Cup: Runners-up
- AFC Champions League: Semi-finals
- Top goalscorer: League: Adriano (17); All: Adriano (35)
- Highest home attendance: 47,899 vs Suwon (League, 18 June)
- Lowest home attendance: 3,539 vs Daegu (FA Cup, 11 May)
- Average home league attendance: 18,895
| Home colours | Away colours |

The 2016 season was South Korean club FC Seoul's 33rd season in the K League Classic, the highest level of the South Korean football league system.

== Pre-season ==
- In Guam: From 8 January 2016 to 26 January 2016
- In Kagoshima, Japan: From 31 January 2016 to 14 February 2016

=== Pre-season match results ===
| Type | Date | Opponents | Result | Score | Scorers | Notes |
|---|---|---|---|---|---|---|
| Practice matches during winter training spell in Kagoshima, Japan | 2 February 2016 | (China) Yanbian Fude | D | 2–2 | (South Korea) Yun Ju-tae, (South Korea) Lee Seok-hyun | |
| Practice matches during winter training spell in Kagoshima, Japan | 4 February 2016 | (Japan) Gamba Osaka | W | 1–0 | (Montenegro) Dejan Damjanović | |
| Practice matches during winter training spell in Kagoshima, Japan | 4 February 2016 | (Japan) Gamba Osaka | D | 1–1 | (South Korea) Cho Chan-ho | |
| Practice matches during winter training spell in Kagoshima, Japan | 7 February 2016 | (Japan) Kyoto Sanga | W | 2–0 | (South Korea) Cho Chan-ho (2) | |
| Practice matches during winter training spell in Kagoshima, Japan | 10 February 2016 | (Japan) Júbilo Iwata | D | 1–1 | (Montenegro) Dejan Damjanović | |
| Practice matches during winter training spell in Kagoshima, Japan | 10 February 2016 | (Japan) Honda Lock | W | 3–1 | (South Korea) Lee Min-kyu (1), (Brazil) Adriano (2) | |
| Practice matches during winter training spell in Kagoshima, Japan | 13 February 2016 | (Japan) FC Tokyo | W | 1–0 | Own goal | |
| Practice matches during winter training spell in Kagoshima, Japan | 13 February 2016 | (Japan) FC Tokyo | L | 1–3 | (South Korea) Lee Seok-hyun | |

== Competitions ==
=== Overview ===
| Competition | Starting round | Final position | Record | | | | | | | |
| Competition | Starting round | Final position | Pld | W | D | L | GF | GA | GD | Win % |
|---|---|---|---|---|---|---|---|---|---|---|
| K League Classic | Matchday 1 | Matchday 38 | | | | | — | | | |
| FA Cup | Round of 32 | | | | | | — | | | |
| AFC Champions League | Group stage | | | | | | — | | | |
| Total | | | 0 | 0 | 0 | 0 | 0 | 0 | +0 | — |

Last updated: 31 December 2016
Source: Fixtures and Results at FC Seoul Official Website

== Match reports and match highlights ==
Fixtures and Results at FC Seoul Official Website (in English)

== Season statistics ==
=== K League Classic records ===
| Season | Teams | Final Position | Pld | W | D | L | GF | GA | GD | Pts | Manager |
|---|---|---|---|---|---|---|---|---|---|---|---|
| 2016 | 12 | Champions | 38 | 21 | 7 | 10 | 67 | 46 | +21 | 70 | (South Korea) Choi Yong-soo (South Korea) Hwang Sun-hong |

=== All competitions records ===
| K League Classic | FA Cup | AFC Champions League | Manager |
|---|---|---|---|
| Champions | Runners-up | Semi-finals | (South Korea) Choi Yong-soo (South Korea) Hwang Sun-hong |

=== Attendance records ===
| Season Total Att. | K League Classic Season Total Att. | K League Classic Season Average Att. | FA Cup Total / Average Att. | ACL Total / Average Att. | Friendly Match Att. | Att. Ranking | Notes |
|---|---|---|---|---|---|---|---|
| 474,044 | 342,134 | 18,895 | 53,645 / 10,729 | 78,265 / 13,044 | N/A | 1st (12 clubs) | |

- Season total attendance includes K League Classic, FA Cup, and AFC Champions League combined.

== Squad statistics ==
=== Goals ===
| Pos | K League Classic | FA Cup | AFC Champions League | Total | Notes |
|---|---|---|---|---|---|
| 1 | (Brazil) Adriano (17 / 30) | (Brazil) Adriano (5 / 6) | (Brazil) Adriano (13 / 11) | (Brazil) Adriano (35 / 47) | |
| 2 | (Montenegro) Dejan Damjanović (13 / 36) | (South Korea) Yun Ju-tae (2 / 2) | (Montenegro) Dejan Damjanović (5 / 11) | (Montenegro) Dejan Damjanović (19 / 51) | |
| 3 | (South Korea) Park Chu-young (10 / 34) | (South Korea) Yoon Seung-won (1 / 1) | (South Korea) Go Yo-han (2 / 11) | (South Korea) Park Chu-young (11 / 49) | |
| 4 | (South Korea) Yun Il-lok (6 / 26) | (Montenegro) Dejan Damjanović (1 / 4) (South Korea) Ju Se-jong (1 / 4) | (South Korea) Yun Ju-tae (1 / 6) (South Korea) Park Yong-woo (1 / 6) (South Korea) Lee Seok-hyun (1 / 6) | (South Korea) Yun Ju-tae (6 / 25) (South Korea) Yun Il-lok (6 / 36) (South Korea) Ju Se-jong (6 / 43) | |
| 5 | (South Korea) Ju Se-jong (4 / 30) | | (South Korea) Kim Won-sik (1 / 8) | (South Korea) Go Yo-han (4 / 42) (Spain) Osmar (4 / 54) | |
| | (Spain) Osmar (4 / 37) | | (South Korea) Ju Se-jong (1 / 9) | | |
| | (South Korea) Yun Ju-tae (3 / 17) | | (South Korea) Park Chu-young (1 / 10) | | |
| | | | (South Korea) Ko Kwang-min (1 / 11) | | |

=== Assists ===
| Pos | K League Classic |
|---|---|
| 1 | (South Korea) Yun Il-lok (7 / 26) |
| 2 | (Brazil) Adriano (6 / 30) |
| 3 | (South Korea) Go Yo-han (5 / 27) |
| 4 | (Japan) Yojiro Takahagi (4 / 32) |
| 5 | (South Korea) Kim Chi-woo (3 / 26) (Spain) Osmar (3 / 37) |

== Coaching staff ==
=== Choi Yong-soo and Kim Seong-jae caretaker Era (–25 June 2016) ===
| Position | Name | Notes |
|---|---|---|
| Manager | (South Korea) Choi Yong-soo | |
| Caretaker Manager | (South Korea) Kim Seong-jae | 22 June 2016–25 June 2016 |
| Assistant manager | (South Korea) Kim Seong-jae | –22 June 2016 |
| First-team coach | (South Korea) Kim Dong-young | |
| First-team coach | (Brazil) Adilson dos Santos | |
| First-team goalkeeping coach | (Brazil) Leandro Maciel de Melo | |
| Reserve Team Coach | (South Korea) Chung Sang-nam | |
| Reserve Team Goalkeeping Coach | (South Korea) Back Min-chul | |
| Fitness coach | (Australia) Adam Waterson | –February 2016 |
| Fitness coach | (Croatia) Jasmin Mujdža | March 2016– |
| U-18 Team Manager | (South Korea) Kim Sang-moon | |
| U-18 Team Coach | (South Korea) Park Hyuk-soon | |
| U-18 Team Goalkeeping Coach | (South Korea) Weon Jong-teok | |
| U-15 Team Manager | (South Korea) Kim Young-jin | |
| U-15 Team Coach | (South Korea) Kim Byung-chae | |
| U-15 Team Goalkeeping Coach | (South Korea) Cho Jun-ho | |
| U-15 Team Fitness Coach | (South Korea) Park Sung-jun | |
| U-12 Team Manager | (South Korea) Park Yo-seb | |
| U-12 Team Coach | | |
| U-12 Team GK Coach | | |
| Chief Scout | (South Korea) Kim Hyun-tae | |
| Scout | (South Korea) Lee Won-jun | |
| Scout | (South Korea) Jung Jae-yoon | |
| Scout | (South Korea) Seo Min-woo | |

=== Hwang Sun-hong Era (27 June 2016– ) ===
| Position | Name | Notes |
|---|---|---|
| Manager | (South Korea) Hwang Sun-hong | |
| Assistant manager | (South Korea) Kang Chul | |
| First-team coach | (South Korea) Kim Dong-young | |
| First-team coach | (Brazil) Adilson dos Santos | |
| First-team goalkeeping coach | (Brazil) Leandro Maciel de Melo | |
| Reserve Team Coach | (South Korea) Chung Sang-nam | |
| Reserve Team Goalkeeping Coach | (South Korea) Back Min-chul | |
| Fitness coach | (Croatia) Jasmin Mujdža | |
| U-18 Team Manager | (South Korea) Kim Sang-moon | |
| U-18 Team Coach | (South Korea) Lee Jung-youl | |
| U-18 Team Goalkeeping Coach | (South Korea) Weon Jong-teok | |
| U-15 Team Manager | (South Korea) Kim Young-jin | |
| U-15 Team Coach | (South Korea) Park Hyuk-soon | |
| U-15 Team Goalkeeping Coach | (South Korea) Cho Jun-ho | |
| U-15 Team Fitness Coach | (South Korea) Park Sung-jun | |
| U-12 Team Manager | (South Korea) Kim Byung-chae | |
| U-12 Team Coach | (South Korea) Seo Ki-man | |
| U-12 Team Goalkeeping Coach | (South Korea) Lee Ji-hun | |
| Chief Scout | (South Korea) Kim Hyun-tae | |
| Scout | (South Korea) Lee Won-jun | |
| Scout | (South Korea) Jung Jae-yoon | |
| Scout | (South Korea) Seo Min-woo | |

=== Supporting staff ===
| Position | Name | Notes |
|---|---|---|
| Club doctor | (South Korea) Cho Yun-sang | |
| Athletic Trainer | (South Korea) Park Sung-ryul, Hwangbo-hyun, Choi Kyu-jung | |
| Performance analyst | (South Korea) Kim Jeong-hoon, Shin Jung-hyun | |
| Equipment manager | (South Korea) Lee Cheun-gil | |
| Translator | (South Korea) Kim Hyun-soo | |

== Players ==
=== Team squad ===
All players registered for the 2016 season are listed.

| No. | POS | Nation | Player | Notes |
|---|---|---|---|---|
| 1 | GK | South Korea | Yoo Hyun (Vice Captain) | |
| 2 | MF | Japan | Yojiro Takahagi | |
| 3 | DF | South Korea | Jung In-whan | |
| 4 | DF | South Korea | Kim Dong-woo | |
| 5 | MF | Spain | Osmar (Captain) | |
| 6 | MF | South Korea | Ju Se-jong | |
| 7 | DF | South Korea | Kim Chi-woo | |
| 8 | MF | South Korea | Sin Jin-ho | Out |
| 9 | FW | Montenegro | Dejan Damjanović | |
| 10 | FW | South Korea | Park Chu-young | |
| 11 | FW | Brazil | Adriano | |
| 13 | MF | South Korea | Go Yo-han | |
| 14 | MF | South Korea | Cho Chan-ho | |
| 15 | MF | South Korea | Kim Won-sik | |
| 16 | FW | South Korea | Shim Je-hyeok | |
| 17 | FW | South Korea | Yun Il-lok | |
| 18 | DF | South Korea | Geum Kyo-jin | In |
| 19 | FW | South Korea | Yun Ju-tae | Conscripted |
| 20 | DF | South Korea | Kim Won-gun | Out & In |
| 21 | DF | South Korea | Sim Sang-min | Out |
| 22 | MF | South Korea | Park Yong-woo | |
| 23 | DF | South Korea | Sim Woo-yeon | |
| 24 | DF | South Korea | Hwang Hyun-soo | |
| 25 | MF | South Korea | Lee Seok-hyun | |
| 26 | DF | South Korea | Kim Nam-chun | Conscripted |
| 27 | MF | South Korea | Ko Kwang-min | |
| 29 | MF | South Korea | Lee Sang-hyeob | |
| 30 | MF | South Korea | Lee Min-kyu | |
| 31 | GK | South Korea | Yu Sang-hun | Conscripted |
| 32 | DF | South Korea | Joo Hyung-jun | |
| 33 | MF | South Korea | Kim Hak-seung | |
| 34 | FW | South Korea | Kim Jeong-hwan | |
| 35 | MF | South Korea | Lim Min-hyeok | |
| 37 | MF | South Korea | Yoon Seung-won | |
| 38 | GK | South Korea | Yang Han-been | |
| 39 | MF | South Korea | Shin Seong-jae | |
| 41 | GK | South Korea | Kim Chol-ho | |
| 42 | MF | South Korea | Kim Ju-yeong | |
| 43 | MF | South Korea | Lee Hyun-gu | |
| 44 | DF | South Korea | Jeong Ye-chan | Out |
| 55 | DF | South Korea | Kwak Tae-hwi | In |
| 61 | MF | South Korea | Choi Hyun-tae | Discharged |
| 88 | DF | South Korea | Lee Kyu-ro | In |

=== Out on loan and military service ===
| No. | POS | Nation | Player | Moving To | Loan Period | Notes |
|---|---|---|---|---|---|---|
| — | MF | South Korea | Choi Hyun-tae | (South Korea) Sangju Sangmu | 2014/12–2016/09 | |
| — | DF | South Korea | Kang Seung-jo | (South Korea) Ansan Mugunghwa | 2015/03–2016/12 | |
| — | DF | South Korea | Lee Woong-hee | (South Korea) Sangju Sangmu | 2015/11–2017/08 | |
| — | FW | South Korea | Park Hee-seong | (South Korea) Sangju Sangmu | 2015/11–2017/08 | |
| — | DF | South Korea | Kim Won-gun | (South Korea) Gangwon FC | 2016/03–2016/07 | |
| — | MF | South Korea | Sin Jin-ho | (South Korea) Sangju Sangmu | 2016/04–2018/01 | |
| — | DF | South Korea | Sim Sang-min | (South Korea) Seoul E-Land | 2016/07–2016/12 | |

※ In: Transferred from other teams in the middle of the season.
※ Out: Transferred to other teams in the middle of the season.
※ Discharged: Transferred from Sanjgu Sangmu or Ansan Mugunghwa for military service in the middle of the season (registered in 2016 season).
※ Conscripted: Transferred to Sangju Sangmu or Ansan Mugunghwa for military service after the end of the season.

== Transfers ==
=== In ===
| No. | Name | Pos. | Moving from | Type | Window | Period | Fee | Notes |
|---|---|---|---|---|---|---|---|---|
| 1 | (South Korea) Kim Won-sik | MF | (South Korea) Incheon United | Loan return | Winter (after the 2015 season) | N/A | N/A | |
| 2 | (South Korea) Kim Won-gun | DF | (South Korea) Gangwon FC | Loan return | Winter (after the 2015 season) | N/A | N/A | March 2016, reloan to Gangwon FC |
| 3 | (South Korea) Yoo Hyun | GK | (South Korea) Incheon United | Free transfer (contract expired) | Winter (2015-12-22) | N/A | Undisclosed | |
| 4 | (Montenegro) Dejan Damjanović | FW | (China) Beijing Guoan | Free transfer (contract expired) | Winter (2015-12-28) | 2 years | Free | |
| 5 | (South Korea) Cho Chan-ho | MF | (South Korea) Pohang Steelers | Free transfer (contract expired) | Winter (2016-01-04) | 3 years | Free | |
| 6 | (South Korea) Sin Jin-ho | MF | (South Korea) Pohang Steelers | Free transfer (contract expired) | Winter (2016-01-04) | 1 year | Free | |
| 7 | (South Korea) Ju Se-jong | MF | (South Korea) Busan IPark | Transfer | Winter (2016-01-08) | 2 years | Trade | Kim Hyun-sung↔Ju Se-jong |
| 8 | (South Korea) Jung In-whan | DF | (China) Henan Jianye | Free transfer (contract expired) | Winter (2016-02-04) | 2 years | Free | |
| 9 | (South Korea) Sim Woo-yeon | DF | (South Korea) Seongnam FC | Free transfer (contract expired) | Winter (2016-02-11) | 2 years | Free | |
| 10 | (South Korea) Kwak Tae-hwi | DF | (Saudi Arabia) Al-Hilal | Free transfer (contract expired) | Summer (2016-07-07) | 2.5 years | Free | |
| 11 | (South Korea) Lee Kyu-ro | DF | (South Korea) Seoul E-Land | Transfer | Summer (2016-07-25) | N/A | Undisclosed | |
| 12 | (South Korea) Kim Won-gun | DF | (South Korea) Gangwon FC | Loan return | Summer (2016-07-28) | N/A | N/A | |
| 13 | (South Korea) Geum Kyo-jin | DF | (South Korea) Gyeongju KHNP | Free transfer (contract expired) | Summer (2016-07-29) | N/A | Free | |
| 14 | (South Korea) Choi Hyun-tae | MF | (South Korea) Sangju Sangmu | Return from military service | Summer (2016-09-14) | N/A | N/A | |

==== Rookie Free Agent ====
| No. | Name | Pos. | Moving from | Type | Notes |
|---|---|---|---|---|---|
| 1 | (South Korea) Joo Hyung-jun | DF | (South Korea) Pai Chai University | Youth system (After Univ.) | FC Seoul U-18 Team (2012 Draft) |
| 2 | (South Korea) Kim Hak-seung | MF | (South Korea) Dongguk University | Youth system (After Univ.) | FC Seoul U-18 Team (2012 Draft) |
| 3 | (South Korea) Sin Seong-jae | MF | (South Korea) Osan High School | Youth system | FC Seoul U-18 Team |
| 4 | (South Korea) Lee Hyeon-gu | FW | (South Korea) Osan High School | Youth system | FC Seoul U-18 Team |
| 5 | (South Korea) Jeong Ye-chan | DF | (South Korea) Jungkyung High School | Free agent | |
| 6 | (South Korea) Lee Min-kyu | MF | (South Korea) Korea University | Free agent | |
| 7 | (South Korea) Lim Min-hyeok | MF | (South Korea) Suwon Technical High School | Free agent | |
| 8 | (South Korea) Kim Jeong-hwan | FW | (South Korea) Shingal High School | Free agent | |
| 9 | (South Korea) Kim Ju-yeong | FW | (South Korea) Jungkyung High School | Free agent | |

- (Univ.) means player who went to university then back to FC Seoul.
- (After Univ.) means player who joined FC Seoul after entering university.

=== Out ===
| No. | Name | Pos. | Moving to | Type | Window | Fee | Notes |
|---|---|---|---|---|---|---|---|
| 1 | (South Korea) Moon Ki-han | MF | (South Korea) Bucheon FC 1995 | Transfer | Winter (2015-12-29) | | Loan finish |
| 2 | (South Korea) Cho Min-woo | DF | (Japan) V-Varen Nagasaki | Transfer | Winter (2016-01-05) | | Loan finish |
| 3 | (Brazil) Rafael Costa | FW | (Brazil) Ceará Sporting Club | Free transfer (Contract terminated) | Winter (2016-01-23) | Undisclosed | Loan finish |
| 4 | (Colombia) Mauricio Molina | MF | (Colombia) Independiente Medellín | Free transfer (contract expired) | Winter (2015-12-28) | | |
| 5 | (South Korea) Lee Jae-kwon | MF | (South Korea) Daegu FC | Transfer | Winter (2015-12-28) | | |
| 6 | (South Korea) Choi Jung-han | FW | (South Korea) Daegu FC | Transfer | Winter (2015-12-28) | | |
| 7 | (South Korea) Kim Hyun-sung | FW | (South Korea) Busan IPark | Transfer | Winter (2016-01-08) | Trade | Kim Hyun-sung↔Ju Se-jong |
| 8 | (South Korea) Jung Jo-gook | FW | (South Korea) Gwangju FC | Free transfer (contract expired) | Winter (2016-01-11) | | |
| 9 | (South Korea) Kim Min-hyeok | MF | (South Korea) Gwangju FC | Transfer | Winter (2016-01-11) | Undisclosed | |
| 10 | (South Korea) Jung Seung-yong | DF | (South Korea) Gangwon FC | Free transfer (contract expired) | Winter (2016-01-12) | | |
| 11 | (South Korea) Kim Yong-dae | GK | (South Korea) Ulsan Hyundai | Free transfer (contract expired) | Winter (2016-02-11) | Undisclosed | |
| 12 | (South Korea) Kim Jin-kyu | DF | (Thailand) Muangthong United | Free transfer (contract expired) | Winter (2016-02-12) | | |
| 13 | (South Korea) Yoo Lo-mon | MF | | Contract expired | Winter (2016-02-12) | | |
| 14 | (South Korea) Jeong Ye-chan | DF | | Withdrawn | During the season (2016-03-18) | | |

==== Loan & Military service ====
| No. | Name | Pos. | Moving to | Date | Duration | Fee | Notes |
|---|---|---|---|---|---|---|---|
| 1 | (South Korea) Lee Woong-hee | DF | (South Korea) Sangju Sangmu | After the 2015 season (15 December 2015) | 21 months | N/A | Conscripted |
| 2 | (South Korea) Park Hee-seong | FW | (South Korea) Sangju Sangmu | After the 2015 season (15 December 2015) | 21 months | N/A | Conscripted |
| 3 | (South Korea) Kim Won-gun | DF | (South Korea) Gangwon FC | Winter (23 March 2016) | 5 months | Undisclosed | Loan |
| 4 | (South Korea) Sin Jin-ho | MF | (South Korea) Sangju Sangmu | During the 2016 season (18 April 2016) | 21 months | N/A | Conscripted |
| 5 | (South Korea) Sim Sang-min | DF | (South Korea) Seoul E-Land | During the 2016 season (25 July 2016) | 5 months | Undisclosed | Loan |

== Tactics ==
=== Tactical analysis ===
Former manager Choi Yong-soo used a 3–5–2 formation. Hwang Sun-hong used a 4–3–3 formation.

=== Starting eleven and formation ===
This section shows the most used players for each position considering a 4–3–3 formation.

| No. | Pos. | Nat. | Name | MS | Notes |
|---|---|---|---|---|---|
| 31 | GK | (South Korea) | Yu Sang-hun | 20 | |
| 13 | DF | (South Korea) | Go Yo-han | 25 | |
| 55 | DF | (South Korea) | Kwak Tae-hwi | 11 | |
| 26 | DF | (South Korea) | Kim Nam-chun | 17 | |
| 27 | DF | (South Korea) | Ko Kwang-min | 31 | |
| 2 | MF | (South Korea) | Yojiro Takahagi | 26 | |
| 5 | MF | (Spain) | Osmar Ibáñez | 36 | |
| 6 | MF | (South Korea) | Ju Se-jong | 26 | |
| 11 | FW | (Montenegro) | Dejan Damjanović | 30 | |
| 9 | FW | (Brazil) | Adriano | 25 | |
| 10 | FW | (South Korea) | Park Chu-young | 21 | |

Source: Squad stats and Start formations.
Only competitive matches.
Using the most used start formation.
Ordered by position on pitch (from back right to front left).

=== Substitutes ===
| No. | Pos. | Nat. | Name | MS | Notes |
|---|---|---|---|---|---|
| 1 | GK | (South Korea) | Yoo Hyun | 18 | |
| 3 | DF | (South Korea) | Jung In-whan | 7 | |
| 7 | DF | (South Korea) | Kim Chi-woo | 19 | |
| 23 | DF | (South Korea) | Sim Woo-yeon | 19 | |
| 14 | MF | (South Korea) | Cho Chan-ho | 5 | |
| 25 | MF | (South Korea) | Lee Seok-hyun | 11 | |
| 19 | FW | (South Korea) | Yun Ju-tae | 2 | |

Source: Squad stats and Start formations.
Only competitive matches.
Using the most used start formation.
Ordered by position on pitch (from back right to front left).
