= 2015 FC Seoul season =

FC Seoul
2015 season
- Chairman: Huh Chang-soo
- Manager: Choi Yong-soo
- K League Classic: 4th
- FA Cup: Winner
- AFC Champions League: Round of 16
- Top goalscorer: League: Yun Ju-tae (9); All: Yun Ju-tae (13)
- Highest home attendance: 39,328 vs Suwon (League, 27 June)
- Lowest home attendance: 1,570 vs Gyeongju (FA Cup, 29 April)
- Average home league attendance: 17,172
Home colours	Away colours

The 2015 season is FC Seoul's 32nd season in the K League Classic, the highest level of the South Korean football league system.

== Pre-season ==
- In Guam: From 3 January 2015 to 22 January 2015
- In Kagoshima, Japan: From 25 January 2015 to 8 February 2015

=== Practice match results ===
Type	Date	Opponents	Result	Score	Scorers	Notes
Practice matches during winter training spell in Kagoshima, Japan	28 January 2015	(Japan) Honda Lock SC	W	6–0	(South Korea) Jung Jo-gook, (South Korea) Lee Seok-hyun, (South Korea) Kim Jin-kyu (South Korea) Park Hee-seong, (Japan) Sergio Escudero, (South Korea) Kim Won-gun	
Practice matches during winter training spell in Kagoshima, Japan	31 January 2015	(Japan) Tokai University	W	4–0	(South Korea) Kim Won-gun, (South Korea) Choi Jung-han, (South Korea) Kim Hyun-sung, (South Korea) Kim Nam-chun	
Practice matches during winter training spell in Kagoshima, Japan	31 January 2015	(South Korea) Daejeon Citizen	W	4–0	(South Korea) Koh Myong-jin, (South Korea) Jung Jo-gook, (South Korea) Yun Il-lok, (South Korea) Shim Je-hyeok	
Practice matches during winter training spell in Kagoshima, Japan	3 February 2015	(Japan) Jubilo Iwata	W	5–1	(South Korea) Jung Seung-yong, (South Korea) Park Hee-seong, (South Korea) Jung Jo-gook, Own goal, (South Korea) Yun Il-lok	
Practice matches during winter training spell in Kagoshima, Japan	5 February 2015	(Japan) Roasso Kumamoto	W	3–0	(South Korea) Jung Jo-gook (2), (South Korea) Choi Jung-han	
Practice matches during winter training spell in Kagoshima, Japan	8 February 2015	(Japan) Sanfrecce Hiroshima	W	1–0	(South Korea) Yun Il-lok	

== Competitions ==
=== Overview ===
Competition	Starting round	Final position	Record							
Competition	Starting round	Final position	Pld	W	D	L	GF	GA	GD	Win %
K League Classic	Matchday 1	Matchday 38					—			
FA Cup	Round of 32						—			
AFC Champions League	Play-off round						—			
Total			0	0	0	0	0	0	+0	—

Last updated: 31 December 2015
Source: Fixtures and Results at FC Seoul Official Website

=== K League Classic ===
==== League table ====
Pos	Team	Pld	W	D	L	GF	GA	GD	Pts	Qualification or relegation
2	Suwon Samsung Bluewings	38	19	10	9	60	43	+17	67	Qualification for Champions League group stage
3	Pohang Steelers	38	18	12	8	49	32	+17	66	Qualification for Champions League play-off round
4	FC Seoul	38	17	11	10	52	44	+8	62	Qualification for Champions League group stage (Note: Qualified as champions of FA Cup.)
5	Seongnam FC	38	15	15	8	41	33	+8	60	
6	Jeju United	38	14	8	16	55	56	−1	50	

Source: K League
Rules for classification: 1) Points; 2) Goal difference; 3) Goals scored; 4) Wins

==== Results summary ====
Overall								Home						Away					
Pld	W	D	L	GF	GA	GD	Pts	W	D	L	GF	GA	GD	W	D	L	GF	GA	GD
38	17	11	10	52	44	+8	62	9	7	3	24	14	+10	8	4	7	28	30	−2

Last updated: 29 November 2015.
Source: Competitive matches

==== Results by round ====
Round	1	2	3	4	5	6	7	8	9	10	11	12	13	14	15	16	17	18	19	20	21	22	23	24	25	26	27	28	29	30	31	32	33	34	35	36	37	38
Ground	A	H	A	H	A	H	A	A	H	A	H	A	H	H	A	H	A	H	A	H	A	H	H	A	H	A	H	A	H	A	A	H	H	A	H	H	A	A
Result	L	L	L	W	D	W	L	D	D	W	W	D	W	W	W	D	L	D	W	D	D	L	W	W	W	W	L	D	L	W	L	W	W	W	D	W	D	L
Position	11	11	11	10	10	8	9	9	10	10	7	8	10	6	3	3	5	5	4	4	3	6	4	4	6	5	4	4	4	5	5	5	5	4	4	4	4	4

Updated to match(es) played on 29 November 2015. Source: Competitive matches
A = Away; H = Home; W = Win; D = Draw; L = Loss

=== FA Cup ===
29 April 2015 Round of 32	FC Seoul	3 – 0	Gyeongju KH&NP	Seoul
19:30 KST (UTC+09:00)	Shim Je-hyeok 33'; Jung Jo-gook 84', 86'	Report(Korean)		Stadium: Seoul World Cup Stadium; Attendance: 1,570

24 June 2015 Round of 16	Hwaseong FC	1 – 2	FC Seoul	Hwaseong, Gyeonggi
19:00 KST (UTC+09:00)	Kim Nam-chun 71' (o.g.)	Report(Korean)	Éverton 45'; Yun Ju-tae 90'	Stadium: Hwaseong Stadium; Attendance: 5,832

22 July 2015 Quarter-finals	FC Seoul	2 – 1	Pohang Steelers	Seoul
19:30 KST (UTC+09:00)	Park Chu-young 25', 68'	Report(Korean)	Kim Dae-ho 22'	Stadium: Seoul World Cup Stadium; Attendance: 6,267

14 October 2015 Semi-finals	Ulsan Hyundai	1 – 2	FC Seoul	Ulsan
19:30 KST (UTC+09:00)	Kovačec 68'	Report(Korean)	Takahagi 38'; Adriano 54'	Stadium: Ulsan Munsu Football Stadium; Attendance: 7,474

31 October 2015 Final	FC Seoul	3 – 1	Incheon United	Seoul
13:30 KST (UTC+09:00)	Takahagi 33'; Adriano 88'; Molina 90+1'	Report(Korean)	Lee Hyo-kyun 72'	Stadium: Seoul World Cup Stadium; Attendance: 26,797; Referee: Ko Hyung-jin

=== AFC Champions League ===
==== Play-off round ====
17 February 2015 Play-off round	FC Seoul (South Korea)	7–0	(Vietnam) Hà Nội T&T	Seoul, South Korea
19:30 UTC+9	Yun Il-lok 14'; Éverton Santos 20'; Jung Jo-gook 30', 46'; Escudero 40'; Lee Seok-hyun 70'; Koh Myong-jin 72'	Report		Stadium: Seoul World Cup Stadium; Attendance: 6,718; Referee: Ryuji Sato (Japan)

==== Group stage ====
Group H
Team	Pld	W	D	L	GF	GA	GD	Pts
(China) Guangzhou Evergrande	6	3	1	2	9	9	0	10
(South Korea) FC Seoul	6	2	3	1	5	4	+1	9
(Australia) Western Sydney Wanderers	6	2	2	2	9	7	+2	8
(Japan) Kashima Antlers	6	2	0	4	10	13	−3	6

25 February 2015 1	Guangzhou Evergrande (China)	1–0	(South Korea) FC Seoul	Guangzhou, China PR
20:00 UTC+8	Goulart 31'	Report		Stadium: Tianhe Stadium; Attendance: 46,749; Referee: Mohanad Qasim Eesee Sarray (Iraq)

4 March 2015 2	FC Seoul (South Korea)	1–0	(Japan) Kashima Antlers	Seoul, South Korea
19:30 UTC+9	Kim Jin-kyu 66'	Report		Stadium: Seoul World Cup Stadium; Attendance: 5,790; Referee: Alireza Faghani (Iran)

18 March 2015 3	FC Seoul (South Korea)	0–0	(Australia) Western Sydney Wanderers	Seoul, South Korea
19:30 UTC+9		Report		Stadium: Seoul World Cup Stadium; Attendance: 5,645; Referee: Ammar Al-Jeneibi (United Arab Emirates)

7 April 2015 4	Western Sydney Wanderers (Australia)	1–1	(South Korea) FC Seoul	Sydney, Australia
19:30 UTC+10	Bulut 12'	Report	Go Yo-han 72'	Stadium: Parramatta Stadium; Attendance: 7,073; Referee: Valentin Kovalenko (Uzbekistan)

21 April 2015 5	FC Seoul (South Korea)	0–0	(China) Guangzhou Evergrande	Seoul, South Korea
19:30 UTC+9		Report		Stadium: Seoul World Cup Stadium; Attendance: 17,157; Referee: Abdulrahman Al-Jassim (Qatar)

5 May 2015 6	Kashima Antlers (Japan)	2–3	(South Korea) FC Seoul	Kashima, Japan
20:00 UTC+9	Akasaki 8'; Shibasaki 79'	Report	Lee Woong-hee 36'; Osmar 51'; Molina 90+1'	Stadium: Kashima Soccer Stadium; Attendance: 19,233; Referee: Abdullah Al Hilali (Oman)

==== Knockout stage ====
===== Round of 16 =====
20 May 2015 First leg	FC Seoul (South Korea)	1–3	(Japan) Gamba Osaka	Seoul, South Korea
19:30 UTC+9	Yun Ju-tae 90+2'	Report	Usami 63', 86'; Yonekura 74'	Stadium: Seoul World Cup Stadium; Attendance: 10,607; Referee: Mohanad Qasim Eesee Sarray (Iraq)

27 May 2015 Second leg	Gamba Osaka (Japan)	3–2 (6–3 agg.)	(South Korea) FC Seoul	Suita, Japan
19:00 UTC+9	Patric 16'; Kurata 45'; Lins 86'	Report	Yun Ju-tae 58', 90+2'	Stadium: Osaka Expo '70 Stadium; Attendance: 9,597; Referee: Alireza Faghani (Iran)

== Match reports and match highlights ==
Fixtures and Results at FC Seoul Official Website (in English)

== Season statistics ==
=== K League Classic records ===
Season	Teams	Final Position	Pld	W	D	L	GF	GA	GD	Pts	Manager
2015	12	4th	38	17	11	10	52	44	+8	62	(South Korea) Choi Yong-soo

=== All competitions records ===
Seasoan	Teams	K League Classic	FA Cup	AFC Champions League	Manager
2015	12	4th	Winners	Round of 16	(South Korea) Choi Yong-soo

=== Attendance records ===
Season	Season Total / Average Att.	K League Classic Total / Average Att.	FA Cup Total / Average Att.	ACL Total / Average Att.	Friendly Match Att.	Att. Ranking	Notes
2015	406,820 / 15,067	326,269 / 17,172	34,634 / 11,545	45,917 / 9,183	N/A	K League Season; Total Att. 2nd	

- Season total attendance is K League Classic, FA Cup, AFC Champions League in the aggregate and friendly match attendance is not included.

== Squad statistics ==
=== Goals ===
Pos	K League Classic	FA Cup	AFC Champions League	Total	Notes
1	(South Korea) Yun Ju-tae (9 / 26)	(South Korea) Jung Jo-gook (2 / 1) (South Korea) Park Chu-young (2 / 1)	(South Korea) Yun Ju-tae (3 / 3)	(South Korea) Yun Ju-tae (13 / 32)	
2	(Brazil) Adriano (8 / 13)	(Japan) Takahagi (2 / 2) (Brazil) Adriano (2 / 2)	(South Korea) Jung Jo-gook (2 / 6)	(Brazil) Adriano (10 / 15)	
3	(South Korea) Park Chu-young (7 / 23)	(Brazil) Éverton (1 / 1) (South Korea) Shim Je-hyeok (1 / 1)	(Japan) Sergio Escudero (1 / 1)	(South Korea) Park Chu-young (8 / 24)	
4	(Brazil) Éverton (4 / 16)	(South Korea) Yun Ju-tae (1 / 3)	(South Korea) Lee Seok-hyun (1 / 3)	(Brazil) Éverton (6 / 23)	
5	(South Korea) Kim Hyun-sung (4 / 17)	(Colombia) Molina (1 / 5)	(Brazil) Éverton (1 / 6) (South Korea) Go Yo-han (1 / 6) (South Korea) Kim Jin-kyu (1 / 6)	(Colombia) Molina (6 / 47)	
	(Colombia) Molina (4 / 35)		(Colombia) Molina (1 / 7) (Spain) Osmar (1 / 7)		
			(South Korea) Yun Il-lok (1 / 8) (South Korea) Koh Myong-jin (1 / 8) (South Korea) Lee Woong-hee (1 / 8)		

=== Assists ===
Pos	K League Classic	Total	Notes
1	(Colombia) Molina (11 / 35)	(Colombia) Molina (11 / 35)	
2	(South Korea) Yun Il-lok (3 / 20)	(South Korea) Yun Il-lok (3 / 20)	
3	(South Korea) Ko Kwang-min (3 / 28)	(South Korea) Ko Kwang-min (3 / 28)	
4	(South Korea) Sim Sang-min (2 / 12)	(South Korea) Sim Sang-min (2 / 12)	
5	(South Korea) Park Chu-young (2 / 23)	(South Korea) Park Chu-young (2 / 23)	
	(South Korea) Cha Du-ri (2 / 24)	(South Korea) Cha Du-ri (2 / 24)	

== Coaching staff ==
Position	Name	Period	Notes
Manager	(South Korea) Choi Yong-soo		
Assistant manager	(South Korea) Kim Seong-jae		
Coach	(South Korea) Song Kyung-sub		
Coach	(South Korea) Kim Han-yoon		
Coach	(Brazil) Adilson dos Santos		
Goalkeeping coach	(Brazil) Leandro		
Fitness coach	(Brazil) Wagner		
U-18 Team Manager	(South Korea) Kim Sang-moon		
U-18 Team Coach	(South Korea) Min Dong-sung		
U-18 Team Coach	(South Korea) Park Yo-seb	(2015/07/??–2015/07/31)	
U-18 Team Goalkeeping Coach	(South Korea) Kim Sung-soo		
U-15 Team Manager	(South Korea) Chung Sang-nam		
U-15 Team Coach	(South Korea) Park Hyuk-soon		
U-15 Team Goalkeeping Coach	(South Korea) Cho Jun-ho		
U-15 Team Fitness Coach	(South Korea) Park Sung-jun		
U-12 Team Manager	(South Korea) Park Yo-seb	(–2015/07/??)	
U-12 Team Coach	(South Korea) Kim Byung-chae		
U-12 Team Goalkeeping Coach	(South Korea) Weon Jong-teok		
Chief scout	(South Korea) Kim Hyun-tae		
Scout	(South Korea) Lee Won-jun		
Scout	(South Korea) Jung Jae-yoon		
Scout	(South Korea) Seo Min-woo		

== Players ==
=== Team squad ===
All players registered for the 2015 season are listed.

Note: Flags indicate national team as defined under FIFA eligibility rules; some limited exceptions apply. Players may hold more than one non-FIFA nationality.

No.	Pos.	Nation	Player
1	GK	KOR	Kim Yong-dae
2	MF	JPN	Yojiro Takahagi (In)
3	DF	KOR	Lee Woong-hee
4	MF	ESP	Osmar Ibáñez (vice captain)
5	DF	KOR	Cha Du-ri (captain)^{1}(Retired)
6	DF	KOR	Kim Jin-kyu
7	DF	KOR	Kim Chi-woo
8	MF	KOR	Lee Seok-hyun
9	FW	JPN	Sergio Escudero (Out)
10	FW	BRA	Éverton Santos (Out)
11	MF	COL	Mauricio Molina
13	MF	KOR	Go Yo-han
14	FW	KOR	Park Hee-seong
15	MF	KOR	Choi Jung-han
16	MF	KOR	Jung Seung-yong
17	FW	KOR	Yun Il-lok
18	FW	KOR	Kim Hyun-sung
19	FW	KOR	Yun Ju-tae
20	DF	KOR	Kim Won-gun (Out)
21	DF	KOR	Sim Sang-min

No.	Pos.	Nation	Player
22	MF	KOR	Koh Myong-jin (captain)^{1}(Out)
23	MF	KOR	Kim Min-hyeok
24	DF	KOR	Hwang Hyun-soo
25	FW	BRA	Adriano (In)
26	DF	KOR	Kim Nam-chun
27	MF	KOR	Ko Kwang-min
28	DF	KOR	Kim Dong-woo
29	MF	KOR	Lee Sang-hyeob
31	GK	KOR	Yu Sang-hun
32	MF	KOR	Lee Jae-kwon (Discharged)
33	MF	KOR	Yoo Lo-mon
34	MF	KOR	Park Yong-woo
36	FW	KOR	Jung Jo-gook
37	MF	KOR	Yoon Seung-won
38	GK	KOR	Yang Han-been
40	FW	KOR	Shim Je-hyeok
41	GK	KOR	Kim Chol-ho
42	MF	KOR	Kang Seung-jo (Conscripted)^{[3]}
91	FW	KOR	Park Chu-young (In)

1. From 1 May, Cha Du-ri appointed as new captain.
2. Koh Myoung-jin served as captain by 30 April
3. Kang Seung-jo was conscripted in the middle of season.

=== Out on loan & military service ===
Note: Flags indicate national team as defined under FIFA eligibility rules; some limited exceptions apply. Players may hold more than one non-FIFA nationality.

No.	Pos.	Nation	Player
—	DF	KOR	Cho Min-woo (to (Japan) V-Varen Nagasaki until December 2015)
—	MF	KOR	Moon Ki-han (to (South Korea) Daegu FC until December 2015)
—	MF	KOR	Kim Won-sik (to (South Korea) Incheon United until December 2015)
—	FW	BRA	Rafael Costa (to (Brazil) Joinville EC until July 2015)
—	FW	BRA	Rafael Costa (to (Brazil) Joinville EC until December 2015)
—	DF	KOR	Kim Won-gun (to (South Korea) Gangwon FC until December 2015 season)

No.	Pos.	Nation	Player
—	MF	KOR	Lee Jae-kwon (to (South Korea) Ansan Police until September 2015 / Discharged)
—	MF	KOR	Choi Hyun-tae (to (South Korea) Sangju Sangmu until September 2016)
—	MF	KOR	Kang Seung-jo (to (South Korea) Ansan Police until December 2016)

※ In : Transferred from other teams in the middle of season.
※ Out : Transferred to other teams in the middle of season.
※ Discharged : Transferred from Sangju Sangmu and Ansan Police for military service in the middle of season. (Registered in 2015 season)
※ Conscripted : Transferred to Sangju Sangmu and Ansan Police for military service after end of season.

== Transfers ==
=== In ===
#	Name	POS	Moving from	Mode	Window	Period	Fee	Notes
1	(South Korea) Yoon Seung-won	MF	(South Korea) Gimhae FC	Loan return	Winter (after the 2014 season)	N/A	N/A	
2	(South Korea) Lee Seok-hyun	MF	(South Korea) Incheon United	Transfer	Winter (2015-01-02)	Undisclosed	$3500,000	
3	(South Korea) Park Chu-young	FW	(Saudi Arabia) Al-Shabab	Free transfer (Contract terminated)	Winter (2015-03-10)	3 Years	Free	
4	(Japan) Yojiro Takahagi	MF	(Australia) Western Sydney Wanderers	Free transfer (Contract exfired)	Summer (2015-06-16)	2 years 6 months	Free	
5	(Brazil) Adriano	FW	(South Korea) Daejeon Citizen	Transfer	Summer (2015-07-28)	2 years 6 months	$560,000	
6	(South Korea) Lee Jae-kwon	MF	(South Korea) Ansan Polilce	Return from military service	N/A (2015-09-23)		N/A	

==== Rookie Draft & Free Agent ====
#	Name	POS	Moving from	Mode	Notes
1	(South Korea) 이정기	DF	(South Korea) Osan High School	Youth system (Univ.)	FC Seoul U-18 Team
2	(South Korea) 황기욱	MF	(South Korea) Osan High School	Youth system (Univ.)	FC Seoul U-18 Team
3	(South Korea) 이영찬	MF	(South Korea) Osan High School	Youth system (Univ.)	FC Seoul U-18 Team
4	(South Korea) 김민준	FW	(South Korea) Osan High School	Youth system (Univ.)	FC Seoul U-18 Team
5	(South Korea) 유로몬	DF	(South Korea) Ryutsu Keizai University	Extra	
6	(South Korea) 김원균	DF	(South Korea) Korea University	Rookie Free agent	
7	(South Korea) 김민혁	MF	(South Korea) Kwangwoon University	Rookie Free agent	
8	(South Korea) 박용우	MF	(South Korea) Konkuk University	Rookie Free agent	

(1) 우선지명 : 각 구단 유소년 클럽 출신 선수들에 대해 4명까지 우선 지명
(2) 일반지명 : 1순위에서 6순위까지 추첨순서에서 의해서 지명하며 유소년클럽 출신에 대한
우선지명이 3순위 지명권에 해당되며 구단 사정에 따라 지명권을 행사 안 할 수 있음
(3) 번외지명 : 6순위까지 끝나고 번외로 다시 6순위까지 선수 지명
(4) 추가지명 : 드래프트에서 미선발된 선수들에 한하여 2월말까지 구단 자율적으로 지명

- (대) 표기는 드래프트에 참여하여 선발은 되었지만 당해 연도에 입단하지 않고 대학 진학 후 입단하는 선수를 의미한다.
- (대후) 표기는 드래프트에 기 선발된 후 대학에 진학하여 중퇴 및 졸업 후 당해 연도에 입단하는 선수를 의미한다.
- 근거자료

=== Out ===
#	Name	POS	Moving to	Mode	Window	Period	Fee	Notes
1	(South Korea) 문동주	FW	미상	계약해지	겨울 이적시장 (2015-01-08)			임대종료 후 계약해지; 2015년 1월 FA 공시
2	(South Korea) 한태유	MF	미상	계약만료	겨울 이적시장 (2014-12-31)			
3	(South Korea) 김주영	DF	(China) 상하이 상강	완전이적	겨울 이적시장 (2014-12-23)	3년	약 27억 원	
4	(South Korea) 최효진	DF	(South Korea) 전남 드래곤즈	완전이적	겨울 이적시장 (2015-01-02)	2년	비공개	
5	(South Korea) 조남기	MF	미상	계약해지	겨울 이적시장			2014년 12월 FA 공시
6	(South Korea) 이준형	DF	미상	계약해지	겨울 이적시장			2014년 12월 FA 공시
7	(South Korea) 한일구	GK	미상	계약해지	겨울 이적시장 (2015-01-08)			2015년 1월 FA 공시
8	(South Korea) 송승주	DF	미상	계약해지	겨울 이적시장 (2015-01-08)			2015년 1월 FA 공시
9	(South Korea) 정동철	FW	미상	계약해지	겨울 이적시장 (2015-01-08)			2015년 1월 FA 공시
10	(South Korea) 최명훈	MF	미상	계약해지	겨울 이적시장 (2015-01-08)			2015년 1월 FA 공시
11	(South Korea) 김동석	MF	(South Korea) 인천 유나이티드	자유이적 (계약해지)	겨울 이적시장 (2015-01-29)	비공개	무상	
12	(Japan) 에스쿠데로	FW	(China) 장쑤 궈신 순톈	완전이적	겨울 이적시장 (2015-02-24)	2년	약 17~19억 원	
13	(South Korea) 김우현	DF	미상	계약해지	겨울 이적시장 (2015-03-??)			
14	(South Korea) 고명진	MF	(Qatar) 알라이얀 SC	완전이적	여름 이적시장 (2015-07-15)	3년	약 20억 원	
15	(Brazil) 에벨톤	FW	(South Korea) 울산 현대	자유이적 (계약해지)	여름 이적시장 (2015-07-28)	비공개	무상	
16	(South Korea) 차두리	DF	N/A	은퇴 (계약만료)	2015 시즌 중 (2015-11-07)			

==== Loan & Military service ====
#	Name	POS	Moving to	Window	Period	Fee	Notes
1	(South Korea) 최현태	MF	(South Korea) 상주 상무	2014 시즌 종료 후 (2014-12-15)	21개월	N/A	
2	(South Korea) 문기한	MF	(South Korea) 대구 FC	겨울 이적시장 (2015-01-05)	1년	비공개	
3	(Brazil) 하파엘	FW	(Brazil) 조인빌리 EC	겨울 이적시장 (2015-01-07)	1년	비공개	
4	(South Korea) 조민우	DF	(Japan) V-바렌 나가사키	겨울 이적시장 (2015-01-17)	1년	비공개	
5	(South Korea) 김원식	MF	(South Korea) 인천 유나이티드	겨울 이적시장 (2015-01-29)	1년	비공개	
6	(South Korea) 강승조	MF	(South Korea) 안산 경찰청	2015 시즌 중 (2015-03-26)	21개월	N/A	
7	(South Korea) 김원균	DF	(South Korea) 강원 FC	여름 이적시장 (2015-07-29)	5개월	비공개	

== Technical report ==
=== Starting 11 & Formation ===
This section shows the most used players for each position considering a 3–5–2 formation.

No.	Pos.	Nat.	Name	MS	Notes
31	GK	(South Korea)	Yu Sang-hun		
3	DF	(South Korea)	Lee Woong-hee		
34	DF	(South Korea)	Park Yong-woo		
28	DF	(South Korea)	Kim Dong-woo		
5	MF	(South Korea)	Cha Du-ri		
2	MF	(Japan)	Yojiro Takahagi		
4	MF	(Spain)	Osmar Ibáñez		
11	MF	(Colombia)	Mauricio Molina		
27	MF	(South Korea)	Ko Kwang-min		
91	FW	(South Korea)	Park Chu-young		
24	FW	(Brazil)	Adriano		

Source: Squad stats and Start formations.
Only competitive matches.
Using the most used start formation.
Ordered by position on pitch (from back right to front left).

=== Substitutes ===
No.	Pos.	Nat.	Name	MS	Notes
1	GK	(South Korea)	Kim Yong-dae		
5	DF	(South Korea)	Kim Jin-kyu		
6	MF	(South Korea)	Kim Chi-woo		
8	MF	(South Korea)	Lee Seok-hyun		
13	MF	(South Korea)	Go Yo-han		
17	FW	(South Korea)	Yun Il-lok		
19	FW	(South Korea)	Yun Ju-tae		

Source: Squad stats and Start formations.
Only competitive matches.
Using the most used start formation.
Ordered by position on pitch (from back right to front left).

== See also ==
- FC Seoul
