= 2014 FC Seoul season =

FC Seoul
2014 season
- Chairman: Huh Chang-soo
- Manager: Choi Yong-soo
- K League Classic: 3rd
- FA Cup: Runners-up
- AFC Champions League: Semi-finals
- Top goalscorer: League: Yun Il-lok (7); All: Yun Il-lok (10)
- Highest home attendance: 46,549 vs Suwon (League, 12 July)
- Lowest home attendance: 3,115 vs Incheon (FA Cup, 30 April)
- Average home league attendance: 16,867
Home colours	Away colours

The 2014 season is FC Seoul's 31st season in the K League Classic, the highest level of the South Korean football league system.

== Pre-season ==
- In Guam: From 7 January 2014 to 27 January 2014
- In Kagoshima, Japan: From 3 February 2016 to 17 February 2016

=== Pre-season match results ===
Type	Date	Opponents	Scorers	Result	Score	Notes
Practice matches during winter training spell in Kagoshima, Japan	5 February 2014	(Japan) Ehime FC	W	2–1	(Spain) Osmar Ibáñez, (Japan) Sergio Escudero	
Practice matches during winter training spell in Kagoshima, Japan	7 February 2014	(Japan) Kamatamare Sanuki	W	2–1	(Japan) Sergio Escudero, (South Korea) Kim Hyun-sung	
Practice matches during winter training spell in Kagoshima, Japan	10 February 2014	(Japan) Shimizu S-Pulse	L	1–3	(South Korea) Yun Ju-tae	
Practice matches during winter training spell in Kagoshima, Japan	12 February 2014	(Japan) Urawa Red Diamonds	L	0–2		
Practice matches during winter training spell in Kagoshima, Japan	12 February 2014	(Japan) Urawa Red Diamonds	L	2–3	(Brazil) Rafael Costa (2)	
Practice matches during winter training spell in Kagoshima, Japan	15 February 2014	(Japan) Kyoto Sanga F.C.	L	2–4	(South Korea) Yun Ju-tae, (South Korea) Go Yo-han	

== Competitions ==
=== Overview ===
Competition	Starting round	Final position	Record							
Competition	Starting round	Final position	Pld	W	D	L	GF	GA	GD	Win %
K League Classic	Matchday 1	Matchday 38					—			
FA Cup	Round of 32						—			
AFC Champions League	Group Stage						—			
Total			0	0	0	0	0	0	+0	—

Last updated: 31 December 2014
Source: Fixtures and Results at FC Seoul Official Website

=== K League Classic ===
==== League table ====
Pos	Team	Pld	W	D	L	GF	GA	GD	Pts	Qualification or relegation
1	Jeonbuk Hyundai Motors (C)	38	24	9	5	60	22	+38	81	Qualification for Champions League group stage
2	Suwon Samsung Bluewings	38	19	10	9	52	37	+15	67	Qualification for Champions League group stage
3	FC Seoul	38	15	13	10	42	28	+14	58	Qualification for Champions League play-off round
4	Pohang Steelers	38	16	10	12	50	39	+11	58	
5	Jeju United	38	14	12	12	39	36	+3	54	

Source: RSSSF
Rules for classification: 1) Points; 2) Goal difference; 3) Goals scored
(C) Champions

==== Results summary ====
Overall								Home						Away					
Pld	W	D	L	GF	GA	GD	Pts	W	D	L	GF	GA	GD	W	D	L	GF	GA	GD
38	15	13	10	42	28	+14	58	6	7	6	20	14	+6	9	6	4	22	14	+8

Last updated: 30 November 2014.
Source: Competitive matches

==== Results by round ====
Round	1	2	3	4	5	6	7	8	9	10	11	12	13	14	15	16	17	18	19	20	21	22	23	24	25	26	27	28	29	30	31	32	33	34	35	36	37	38
Ground	H	A	H	H	A	H	A	H	H	A	A	H	A	A	H	A	H	A	H	A	H	A	H	A	A	H	A	H	A	H	A	A	H	H	A	H	H	A
Result	L	D	L	W	L	D	L	D	L	W	L	W	D	D	W	D	W	D	L	W	W	W	D	W	W	W	D	D	W	L	L	W	D	L	W	D	D	W
Position	8	10	10	9	9	9	11	11	11	10	11	9	9	9	7	7	7	7	7	7	7	7	7	7	6	5	5	5	5	5	5	5	4	5	4	4	4	3

Updated to match(es) played on 30 November 2014. Source: Competitive matches
A = Away; H = Home; W = Win; D = Draw; L = Loss

==== Matches ====
8 March 2014 1	FC Seoul	0 – 1	Jeonnam Dragons	Seoul
16:00 KST (UTC+09:00)		Report	Lee Hyun-seung 59' (pen.)	Stadium: Seoul World Cup Stadium; Attendance: 13,674

15 March 2014 2	Seongnam FC	0 – 0	FC Seoul	Seongnam, Gyeonggi
16:00 KST (UTC+09:00)		Report		Stadium: Tancheon Sports Complex; Attendance: 8,624

23 March 2014 3	FC Seoul	0 – 1	Busan IPark	Seoul
14:00 KST (UTC+09:00)		Report	Yang Dong-hyun 22'	Stadium: Seoul World Cup Stadium; Attendance: 16,460

26 March 2014 4	FC Seoul	2 – 0	Jeju United	Seoul
19:30 KST (UTC+09:00)	Go Yo-han 68'; Yun Il-lok 73'	Report		Stadium: Seoul World Cup Stadium; Attendance: 6,872

29 March 2014 5	Ulsan Hyundai	2 – 1	FC Seoul	Ulsan
--:-- KST (UTC+09:00)				Stadium: Ulsan Munsu Football Stadium

6 April 2014 6	FC Seoul	1 – 1	Jeonbuk Hyundai Motors	Seoul
--:-- KST (UTC+09:00)				Stadium: Seoul World Cup Stadium

9 April 2014 7	Sangju Sangmu	2 – 1	FC Seoul	Sangju, Gyeongbuk
--:-- KST (UTC+09:00)				Stadium: Sangju Civic Stadium

12 April 2014 8	FC Seoul	0 – 0	Gyeongnam FC	Seoul
--:-- KST (UTC+09:00)				Stadium: Seoul World Cup Stadium

20 April 2014 9	FC Seoul	0 – 1	Pohang Steelers	Seoul
--:-- KST (UTC+09:00)				Stadium: Seoul World Cup Stadium

27 April 2014 10	Suwon Samsung Bluewings	0 – 1	FC Seoul	Suwon, Gyeonggi
--:-- KST (UTC+09:00)				Stadium: Suwon World Cup Stadium

3 May 2014 11	Incheon United	1 – 0	FC Seoul	Incheon
--:-- KST (UTC+09:00)				Stadium: Incheon Football Stadium

18 May 2014 12	FC Seoul	1 – 0	Seongnam FC	Seoul
16:00 KST (UTC+09:00)	Park Hee-seong 85'	Report		Stadium: Seoul World Cup Stadium; Attendance: 18,636

5 July 2014 13	Jeonnam Dragons	2 – 2	FC Seoul	Gwangyang, Jeonnam
19:00 KST (UTC+09:00)	Lee Jong-ho 9'; Stevo 13'	Report	Osmar 44'; Molina 84'	Stadium: Gwangyang Football Stadium; Attendance: 9,012

9 July 2014 14	Pohang Steelers	0 – 0	FC Seoul	Pohang, Gyeongbuk
--:-- KST (UTC+09:00)				Stadium: Pohang Steel Yard

12 July 2014 15	FC Seoul	2 – 0	Suwon Samsung Bluewings	Seoul
--:-- KST (UTC+09:00)				Stadium: Seoul World Cup Stadium

19 July 2014 16	Jeju United	1 – 1	FC Seoul	Jeju
--:-- KST (UTC+09:00)				Stadium: Jeju World Cup Stadium

23 July 2014 17	FC Seoul	2 – 1	Sangju Sangmu	Seoul
--:-- KST (UTC+09:00)				Stadium: Seoul World Cup Stadium

3 August 2014 18	Gyeongnam FC	1 – 1	FC Seoul	Changwon, Gyeongnam
--:-- KST (UTC+09:00)				Stadium: Changwon Football Center

6 August 2014 19	FC Seoul	0 – 1	Ulsan Hyundai	Seoul
--:-- KST (UTC+09:00)				Stadium: Seoul World Cup Stadium

10 August 2014 20	Busan IPark	0 – 2	FC Seoul	Busan
19:30 KST (UTC+09:00)		Report	Molina 78' (pen.); Escudero 89'	Stadium: Busan Asiad Stadium; Referee: 4,954

16 August 2014 21	FC Seoul	5 – 1	Incheon United	Seoul
--:-- KST (UTC+09:00)				Stadium: Seoul World Cup Stadium

23 August 2014 22	Jeonbuk Hyundai Motors	1 – 2	FC Seoul	Jeonju, Jeonbuk
--:-- KST (UTC+09:00)				Stadium: Jeonju World Cup Stadium

31 August 2014 23	FC Seoul	0 – 0	Jeju United	Seoul
18:00 KST (UTC+09:00)		Report		Stadium: Seoul World Cup Stadium; Attendance: 14,493

7 September 2014 24	Pohang Steelers	0 – 1	FC Seoul	Pohang, Gyeongbuk
--:-- KST (UTC+09:00)				Stadium: Pohang Steel Yard

10 September 2014 25	Seongnam FC	1 – 2	FC Seoul	Seongnam, Gyeonggi
19:30 KST (UTC+09:00)	Hwang Ui-jo 51'	Report	Ko Kwang-min 65'; Koh Myong-jin 90+1'	Stadium: Tancheon Sports Complex; Attendance: 2,652

13 September 2014 26	FC Seoul	3 – 1	Incheon United	Seoul
--:-- KST (UTC+09:00)				Stadium: Seoul World Cup Stadium

20 September 2014 27	Jeonbuk Hyundai Motors	0 – 0	FC Seoul	Jeonju, Jeonbuk
--:-- KST (UTC+09:00)				Stadium: Jeonju World Cup Stadium

24 September 2014 28	FC Seoul	1 – 1	Gyeongnam FC	Seoul
--:-- KST (UTC+09:00)				Stadium: Seoul World Cup Stadium

9 October 2014 29	Ulsan Hyundai	0 – 3	FC Seoul	Ulsan
--:-- KST (UTC+09:00)				Stadium: Ulsan Stadium

5 October 2014 30	FC Seoul	0 – 1	Suwon Samsung Bluewings	Seoul
--:-- KST (UTC+09:00)				Stadium: Seoul World Cup Stadium

12 October 2014 31	Sangju Sangmu	1 – 0	FC Seoul	Sangju, Gyeongbuk
--:-- KST (UTC+09:00)				Stadium: Sangju Civic Stadium

18 October 2014 32	Jeonnam Dragons	1 – 2	FC Seoul	Gwangyang, Jeonnam
14:00 KST (UTC+09:00)	Stevo 79'	Report	Kim Joo-young 57'; Molina 64' (pen.)	Stadium: Gwangyang Football Stadium; Attendance: 4,022

26 October 2014 33	FC Seoul	1 – 1	Busan IPark	Seoul
14:00 KST (UTC+09:00)	Lim Sang-hyub 39'	Report	Park Hee-seong 68'	Stadium: Seoul World Cup Stadium; Attendance: 17,039

2 November 2014 34	FC Seoul	0 – 1	Jeonbuk Hyundai Motors	Seoul
--:-- KST (UTC+09:00)				Stadium: Seoul World Cup Stadium

9 November 2014 35	Suwon Samsung Bluewings	0 – 1	FC Seoul	Suwon, Gyeonggi
--:-- KST (UTC+09:00)				Stadium: Suwon World Cup Stadium

16 November 2014 36	FC Seoul	2 – 2	Ulsan Hyundai	Seoul
--:-- KST (UTC+09:00)				Stadium: Seoul World Cup Stadium

26 November 2014 37	FC Seoul	0 – 0	Pohang Steelers	Seoul
--:-- KST (UTC+09:00)				Stadium: Seoul World Cup Stadium

30 November 2014 38	Jeju United	1 – 2	FC Seoul	Jeju
14:00 KST (UTC+09:00)	Hwang Il-su 19'	Report	Yun Il-lok 69'; Osmar 89'	Stadium: Jeju World Cup Stadium; Attendance: 4,862

=== FA Cup ===
30 April 2014 Round of 32	FC Seoul	3 – 2 (a.e.t.)	Incheon United	Seoul
19:30 KST (UTC+09:00)	Shim Je-hyeok 1'; Ko Kwang-min 46'; Lee Woong-hee 109'		João Paulo 40'; Lee Seok-hyun 65'	Stadium: Seoul World Cup Stadium; Attendance: 3,115

16 July 2014 Round of 16	FC Seoul	2 – 2 (a.e.t.) (4 – 2 p)	Pohang Steelers	Seoul
19:30 KST (UTC+09:00)	Yun Ju-tae 90'; Ko Kwang-min 113'		Kim Hyung-il 55'; Kang Su-il 120'	Stadium: Seoul World Cup Stadium; Attendance: 7,065
	Penalties
	Osmar Ibáñez (penalty scored); Yun Ju-tae (penalty scored); Kim Chi-woo (penalty scored); Kang Seung-jo (penalty scored)		(penalty scored) Kim Jae-sung; (penalty missed) Kim Seung-Dae; (penalty missed) Moon Chang-jin; (penalty scored) Son Joon-ho

13 August 2014 Quarter-finals	Busan IPark	1 – 2 (a.e.t.)	FC Seoul	Busan
19:30 KST (UTC+09:00)	Fagner 2'		Park Hee-seong 39'; Escudero 100'	Stadium: Busan Asiad Stadium; Attendance: 1,527

22 October 2014 Semi-finals	Sangju Sangmu	0 – 1	FC Seoul	Sangju, Gyeongbuk
19:00 KST (UTC+09:00)			Kim Joo-young 9'	Stadium: Sangju Civic Stadium; Attendance: 834

23 November 2014 Final	FC Seoul	0 – 0 (a.e.t.) (2 – 4 p)	Seongnam FC	Seoul
14:15 KST (UTC+09:00)				Stadium: Seoul World Cup Stadium; Attendance: 26,721; Referee: Kim Jong-Hyuk
	Penalties
	Osmar (penalty missed); Kim Jin-kyu (penalty scored); Molina (penalty missed); Kang Seung-jo (penalty scored)		(penalty scored) Jung Seon-ho; (penalty scored) Djeparov; (penalty scored) Lim Chae-min; (penalty scored) Kim Dong-sub

=== AFC Champions League ===
==== Group stage ====
Group F
Team	Pld	W	D	L	GF	GA	GD	Pts
(South Korea) FC Seoul	6	3	2	1	9	6	+3	11
(Japan) Sanfrecce Hiroshima	6	2	3	1	9	8	+1	9
(China) Beijing Guoan	6	1	3	2	7	8	−1	6
(Australia) Central Coast Mariners	6	2	0	4	4	7	−3	6

25 February 2014 1	FC Seoul (South Korea)	2–0	(Australia) Central Coast Mariners	Seoul, South Korea
19:30 UTC+9	Osmar 32' (pen.); Yun Il-lok 56'	Report		Stadium: Seoul World Cup Stadium; Attendance: 6,491; Referee: Fahad Al-Mirdasi (Saudi Arabia)

11 March 2014 2	Beijing Guoan (China)	1–1	(South Korea) FC Seoul	Beijing, China PR
19:30 UTC+8	Utaka 20'	Report	Go Yo-han 71'	Stadium: Workers Stadium; Attendance: 33,813; Referee: Banjar Al-Dosari (Qatar)

19 March 2014 3	Sanfrecce Hiroshima (Japan)	2–1	(South Korea) FC Seoul	Hiroshima, Japan
19:00 UTC+9	Takahagi 53'; Shiotani 79'	Report	Rafael Costa 60'	Stadium: Hiroshima Big Arch; Attendance: 6,281; Referee: Valentin Kovalenko (Uzbekistan)

1 April 2014 4	FC Seoul (South Korea)	2–2	(Japan) Sanfrecce Hiroshima	Seoul, South Korea
19:30 UTC+9	Yun Il-lok 53'; Rafael Costa 90+4' (pen.)	Report	Notsuda 20'; Hwang Seok-ho 70'	Stadium: Seoul World Cup Stadium; Attendance: 8,897; Referee: Fahad Al-Marri (Qatar)

16 April 2014 5	Central Coast Mariners (Australia)	0–1	(South Korea) FC Seoul	Gosford, Australia
19:30 UTC+10		Report	Hutchinson 90+2' (o.g.)	Stadium: Central Coast Stadium; Attendance: 4,118; Referee: Ammar Al-Jeneibi (United Arab Emirates)

23 April 2014 6	FC Seoul (South Korea)	2–1	(China) Beijing Guoan	Seoul, South Korea
19:30 UTC+9	Kang Seung-jo 43'; Yun Ju-tae 57'	Report	Yu Yang 88'	Stadium: Seoul World Cup Stadium; Attendance: 9,562; Referee: Jameel Abdulhusin (Bahrain)

==== Knockout stage ====
===== Round of 16 =====
7 May 2014 First leg	Kawasaki Frontale (Japan)	2–3	(South Korea) FC Seoul	Kawasaki, Japan
19:00 UTC+9	Kobayashi 49'; Renato 61' (pen.)	Report	Escudero 51'; Kim Chi-woo 83'; Yun Il-lok 90+3'	Stadium: Todoroki Athletics Stadium; Attendance: 9,161; Referee: Mohamed Al Zarouni (United Arab Emirates)

14 May 2014 Second leg	FC Seoul (South Korea)	1–2 (4–4 agg.)	(Japan) Kawasaki Frontale	Seoul, South Korea
19:30 UTC+9	Escudero 8'	Report	Kobayashi 29'; Morishima 90+2'	Stadium: Seoul World Cup Stadium; Attendance: 12,287; Referee: Abdulrahman Abdou (Qatar)

===== Quarter-finals =====
20 August 2014 First leg	Pohang Steelers (South Korea)	0–0	(South Korea) FC Seoul	Pohang, South Korea
19:30 UTC+9		Report		Stadium: Pohang Steel Yard; Attendance: 6,553; Referee: Fahad Al-Mirdasi (Saudi Arabia)

27 August 2014 Second leg	FC Seoul (South Korea)	0–0 (a.e.t.) (0–0 agg.) (3–0 p)	(South Korea) Pohang Steelers	Seoul, South Korea
19:30 UTC+9		Report		Stadium: Seoul World Cup Stadium; Attendance: 14,122; Referee: Abdullah Balideh (Qatar)
	Penalties
	Éverton Santos (penalty scored); Osmar (penalty scored); Kim Jin-kyu (penalty missed); Molina (penalty scored)		(penalty missed) Hwang Ji-soo; (penalty missed) Kim Jae-sung; (penalty missed) Park Hee-chul

===== Semi-finals =====
17 September 2014 First leg	FC Seoul (South Korea)	0–0	(Australia) Western Sydney Wanderers	Seoul, South Korea
19:30 UTC+9		Report		Stadium: Seoul World Cup Stadium; Attendance: 12,901; Referee: Nawaf Shukralla (Bahrain)

1 October 2014 Second leg	Western Sydney Wanderers (Australia)	2–0 (2–0 agg.)	(South Korea) FC Seoul	Sydney, Australia
19:30 UTC+10	Poljak 3'; Cole 64'	Report		Stadium: Parramatta Stadium; Attendance: 18,896; Referee: Abdulrahman Abdou (Qatar)

== Match reports and match highlights ==
Fixtures and Results at FC Seoul Official Website (in English)

== Season statistics ==
=== K League Classic records ===
Season	Teams	Final Position	Pld	W	D	L	GF	GA	GD	Pts	Manager
2014	12	3rd	38	15	13	10	42	28	+14	58	(South Korea) Choi Yong-soo

=== All competitions records ===
Seasoan	Teams	K League Classic	FA Cup	AFC Champions League	Manager
2014	12	3rd	Runners-up	Semi-finals	(South Korea) Choi Yong-soo

=== Attendance records ===
Season	Season Total / Average Att.	K League Classic Total / Average Att.	FA Cup Total / Average Att.	ACL Total / Average Att.	Friendly Match Att.	Att. Ranking	Notes
2014	421,631 / 15,058	320,470 / 16,867	36,901 / 12,300	64,2640 / 10,710	46,722	K League Season; Total Att. 2nd	

- Season total attendance is K League Classic, FA Cup, AFC Champions League in the aggregate and friendly match attendance is not included.

== Squad statistics ==
=== Goals ===
Pos	K League Classic	FA Cup	AFC Champions League	Total	Notes
1	(South Korea) Yun Il-lok (7 / 27)	(South Korea) Ko Kwang-min (2 / 5)	(South Korea) Yun Il-lok (3 / 10)	(South Korea) Yun Il-lok (10 / 40)	
2	(Japan) Escudero (6 / 32)	(South Korea) Park Hee-seong (1 / 1) (South Korea) Shim Je-hyeok (1 / 1)	(Brazil) Rafael (2 / 5)	(Japan) Escudero (9 / 48)	
3	(Colombia) Molina (5 / 19)	(South Korea) Yun Ju-tae (1 / 2)	(Japan) Escudero (2 / 11)	(Colombia) Molina (5 / 27)	
4	(South Korea) Go Yo-han (4 / 32)	(Japan) Escudero (1 / 5) (South Korea) Kim Ju-young (1 / 5) (South Korea) Lee Woong-hee (1 / 5)	(South Korea) Yun Ju-tae (1 / 4)	(South Korea) Yun Ju-tae (4 / 16)	
5	(Brazil) Éverton (3 / 16)	N/A	(South Korea) Kang Seung-jo (1 / 7)	(South Korea) Go Yo-han (4 / 44)	
			(South Korea) Go Yo-han (1 / 9 ) (South Korea) Kim Chi-woo (1 / 9 ) (Spain) Osmar (1 / 11)		

=== Assists ===
Pos	K League Classic	Total	Notes
1	(Japan) Escudero (4 / 32)	(Japan) Escudero (4 / 32)	
2	(Colombia) Molina (3 / 19)	(Colombia) Molina (3 / 19)	
3	(South Korea) Ko Kwang-min (3 / 20)	(South Korea) Ko Kwang-min (3 / 20)	
4	(South Korea) Kim Chi-woo (3 / 25)	(South Korea) Kim Chi-woo (3 / 25)	
5	(South Korea) Go Yo-han (3 / 32)	(South Korea) Go Yo-han (3 / 32)	

== Coaching staff ==
Position	Name	Notes
Manager	(South Korea) Choi Yong-soo	
Assistant manager	Vacant	
Coach	(South Korea) Kim Seong-jae	
Coach	(South Korea) Lee Ki-hyung	
Coach	(South Korea) Kim Han-yoon	
Coach	(Brazil) Adilson dos Santos	
Goalkeeping coach	(South Korea) Weon Jong-teok	
Fitness coach	(Japan) Kanno Atsushi	
U-18 & U-15 Team Manager	(South Korea) Choi Gi-bong	
U-18 Team Coach	(South Korea) Yun Dae-sung	
U-18 Team Goalkeeping Coach	(Brazil) Leandro	
U-15 Team Coach	(South Korea) Chung Sang-nam	
U-15 Team Goalkeeping Coach	(South Korea) Cho Jun-ho	
Chief scout	(South Korea) Kim Hyun-tae	
Scout	(South Korea) Lee Won-jun	
Scout	(South Korea) Jung Jae-yoon	
Scout	(South Korea) Kim Sang-moon	
Scout	(South Korea) Seo Min-woo	

== Players ==
=== Team squad ===
All players registered for the 2014 season are listed.

Note: Flags indicate national team as defined under FIFA eligibility rules; some limited exceptions apply. Players may hold more than one non-FIFA nationality.

No.	Pos.	Nation	Player
1	GK	KOR	Kim Yong-dae
2	DF	KOR	Choi Hyo-jin
3	DF	KOR	Lee Woong-hee
4	DF	KOR	Kim Ju-young
5	DF	KOR	Cha Du-ri
6	DF	KOR	Kim Jin-kyu (captain)
7	DF	KOR	Kim Chi-woo
8	MF	KOR	Moon Ki-han (Discharged)
9	FW	JPN	Sergio Escudero
10	FW	BRA	Rafael Costa (Out)
10	FW	BRA	Éverton Santos (In)
11	FW	COL	Mauricio Molina
13	MF	KOR	Go Yo-han
14	FW	KOR	Park Hee-seong
15	DF	KOR	Cho Min-woo (Out)
15	MF	KOR	Choi Jung-han (In)
16	MF	KOR	Kang Seung-jo
17	MF	KOR	Choi Hyun-tae (Conscripted)
18	FW	KOR	Kim Hyun-sung
19	FW	KOR	Yun Ju-tae
20	MF	KOR	Han Tae-you
21	DF	KOR	Sim Sang-min
22	MF	KOR	Koh Myong-jin
23	GK	KOR	Han Il-koo
24	MF	KOR	Yun Il-lok

No.	Pos.	Nation	Player
25	MF	KOR	Kim Dong-suk
26	DF	KOR	Kim Nam-chun
27	MF	KOR	Ko Kwang-min
28	DF	ESP	Osmar Ibáñez
29	MF	KOR	Lee Sang-hyeob
30	DF	KOR	Lee Jun-hyeong
31	GK	KOR	Yu Sang-hun
32	MF	KOR	Jung Seung-yong
33	DF	KOR	Kim Woo-hyun
34	FW	KOR	Jung Dong-cheol
35	MF	KOR	Choi Myung-hun
36	DF	KOR	Lee Taig-ki (Out)
36	FW	KOR	Jung Jo-gook (Discharged)
37	MF	KOR	Cho Nam-ki
38	MF	KOR	Yoon Hyun-oh (Out)
38	GK	KOR	Yang Han Been (In)
39	MF	KOR	Hwang Sin-young (Out)
39	DF	KOR	Kim Dong-woo (Discharged)
40	FW	KOR	Shim Je-hyeok
41	GK	KOR	Kim Chol-ho
42	DF	KOR	Hwang Hyun-soo
43	FW	KOR	Kang Jung-hun (Out)
43	MF	KOR	Kim Won-sik (Discharged)
44	DF	KOR	Song Seung-ju (Discharged)

=== Out on loan & military service ===
Note: Flags indicate national team as defined under FIFA eligibility rules; some limited exceptions apply. Players may hold more than one non-FIFA nationality.

No.	Pos.	Nation	Player
—	MF	KOR	Moon Dong-ju (to (Japan) Ehime FC until December 2014)
—	DF	KOR	Cho Min-woo (to (South Korea) Gangwon FC until December 2014)
—	MF	KOR	Yoon Hyun-oh (to (South Korea) Gangneung FC until December 2014)
—	MF	KOR	Rafael Costa (to (Brazil) Ponte Preta until December 2014)

No.	Pos.	Nation	Player
—	DF	KOR	Kim Dong-woo (to (South Korea) Ansan Police until September 2014 / Discharged)
—	DF	KOR	Song Seung-ju (to (South Korea) Ansan Police until September 2014 / Discharged)
—	MF	KOR	Moon Ki-han (to (South Korea) Ansan Police until September 2014 / Discharged)
—	MF	KOR	Kim Won-sik (to (South Korea) Ansan Police until September 2014 / Discharged)
—	FW	KOR	Jung Jo-gook (to (South Korea) Ansan Police until September 2014 / Discharged)
—	MF	KOR	Lee Jae-kwon (to (South Korea) Ansan Police until September 2015)

- In : Transferred from other teams in the middle of season.
- Out : Transferred to other teams in the middle of season.
- Discharged : Transferred from Sangju Sangmu and Ansan Police for military service in the middle of season. (Registered in 2014 season)
- Conscripted : Transferred to Sangju Sangmu and Ansan Police for military service after end of season.

== Transfers ==
=== In ===
#	Name	POS	Moving from	Mode	Window	Period	Fee	Notes
1	(South Korea) Cho Min-woo	DF	(Japan) V-Varen Nagasaki	Loan return	Winter (End of the 2013 season)		N/A	
2	(South Korea) Kang Jung-hun	FW	(South Korea) Gangwon FC	Loan return	Winter (End of the 2013 season)		N/A	
3	(Spain) Osmar Ibáñez	DF	(Thailand) Buriram United	Transfer	Winter (2014-01-05)	3 years	Undisclosed	
4	(Brazil) Rafael Costa	FW	(Brazil) Figueirense	Transfer	Winter (2014-01-19)	4 years	R$2,000,000	
5	(South Korea) Lee Woong-hee	DF	(South Korea) Daejeon Citizen	Transfer	Winter (2014-01-13)	Undisclosed	Trade	Lee Kwang-jin↔Lee Woong-hee
6	(South Korea) Kim Dong-suk	MF	(South Korea) Ulsan Hyundai	Transfer	Winter (2014-01-28)	Undisclosed	Trade	Choi Tae-uk↔Kim Dong-suk
7	(South Korea) Choi Jung-han	MF	(Japan) Oita Trinita	Free transfer (Contract terminated)	Summer (2014-07-07)	Undisclosed	Free	
8	(Brazil) Éverton Santos	FW	(Brazil) Figueirense	Transfer	Summer (2014-07-17)	Undisclosed	Undisclosed	
9	(South Korea) Yang Han-been	GK	(South Korea) Seongnam FC	Free transfer (Contract terminated)	Summer (2014-07-29)	Undisclosed	Free	
10	(South Korea) Jung Jo-gook	FW	(South Korea) Ansan Police	Return from military service	N/A (2014-09-26)		N/A	
11	(South Korea) Kim Dong-woo	DF	(South Korea) Ansan Police	Return from military service	N/A (2014-09-26)		N/A	
12	(South Korea) Moon Ki-han	MF	(South Korea) Ansan Police	Return from military service	N/A (2014-09-26)		N/A	
13	(South Korea) Song Seung-ju	DF	(South Korea) Ansan Police	Return from military service	N/A (2014-09-26)		N/A	
14	(South Korea) Kim Won-sik	MF	(South Korea) Ansan Police	Return from military service	N/A (2014-09-26)		N/A	

==== Rookie Draft & Free Agent ====
#	Name	POS	Moving from	Mode	Notes
1	(South Korea) Jung Dong-cheol	DF	(South Korea) Kyung Hee University	Youth system (After Univ.)	FC Seoul U-18 Team (2011 Draft)
2	(South Korea) Choi Myung-hun	MF	(South Korea) Soongsil University	Youth system (After Univ.)	FC Seoul U-18 Team (2012 Draft)
3	(South Korea) Hwang Hyun-soo	DF	(South Korea) Osan High School	Youth system	FC Seoul U-18 Team
4	(South Korea) Yoon Hyun-oh	MF	(South Korea) Osan High School	Youth system	FC Seoul U-18 Team
5	(South Korea) Kim Chol-ho	GK	(South Korea) Osan High School	Youth system	FC Seoul U-18 Team
6	(South Korea) Shim Je-hyeok	FW	(South Korea) Osan High School	Youth system	FC Seoul U-18 Team
7	(South Korea) Park Min-gyu	DF	(South Korea) Osan High School	Youth system (Univ.)	FC Seoul U-18 Team
8	(South Korea) Park Jun-Young	DF	(South Korea) Osan High School	Youth system (Univ.)	FC Seoul U-18 Team
9	(South Korea) Yun Ju-tae	MF	(Germany) FSV Frankfurt	Regular (1st)	
10	(South Korea) Kim Woo-hyun	DF	(South Korea) Korea University	Regular (3rd)	
11	(South Korea) Lee Jun-hyeong	DF	(South Korea) Myongji University	Extra	
12	(South Korea) Sim Sang-min	DF	(South Korea) Chung-Ang University	Rookie Free agent	

- (Univ.) means player who go to university then back to FC Seoul.
- (After Univ.) means player who is joined FC Seoul after entering university.

=== Out ===
#	Name	POS	Moving to	Mode	Window	Period	Fee	Notes
1	(South Korea) Lee Kwang-jin	MF	(South Korea) Daejeon Citizen	Transfer	Winter (2014-01-08)	Undisclosed	Trade	Loan finish Lee Kwang-jin↔Lee Woong-hee
2	(South Korea) Youn Sung-woo	MF	(South Korea) Gangneung City Government	Free transfer (Contract terminated)	Winter (2014-02-03)	Undisclosed	Free	Loan finish Free agent
3	(South Korea) Yoon Seung-hyeon	MF	(Croatia) NK Istra 1961	Free transfer (Contract terminated)	Winter (2014-02-03)	2 years 6 months	Free	Loan finish Free agent
4	(South Korea) Kyung Jae-yoon	MF	(South Korea) Bucheon FC 1995	Free transfer (Contract terminated)	Winter (2014-01-03)	Undisclosed	Free	Loan finish Free agent
5	(Montenegro) Dejan Damjanović	FW	(China) Jiangsu Guoxin-Sainty	Transfer	Winter (2013-12-26)	2 years (?)	$4,120,000	
6	(South Korea) Ha Dae-sung	MF	(China) Beijing Guoan	Transfer	Winter (2014-01-03)	3 years	$1670,000	
7	(South Korea) Jang Hyun-woo	DF	(South Korea) Sangju Sangmu	Military service (Contract terminated)	Winter (2014-01-03)			
8	(South Korea) Kim Eun-do	GK	(South Korea) Chungju Hummel	Free transfer (Contract terminated)	Winter (2014-01-03)	Undisclosed	Free	Free agent
9	(South Korea) Choi Bong-won	DF	(Czech Republic) FC Slovan Liberec	Free transfer (Contract terminated)	Winter (2014-01-03)	Undisclosed	Free	Free agent
19	(South Korea) Choi Won-wook	DF	Unknown	Contract terminated	Winter (2014-01-03)			Free agent
11	(South Korea) Park Seung-ryeol	MF	Unknown	Contract terminated	Winter (2014-01-03)			Free agent
12	(South Korea) Shin Hak-young	MF	Unknown	Contract terminated	Winter (2014-01-03)			Free agent
13	(South Korea) Roh Young-gyun	MF	Unknown	Contract terminated	Winter (2014-01-03)			Free agent
14	(South Korea) Lee Seung-kyu	GK	(South Korea) Gwangju FC	Free transfer (Contract expired)	Winter (2014-01-10)	Undisclosed	Free	
15	(South Korea) Kim Sang-pil	DF	(South Korea) Daejeon Citizen	Free transfer (Contract terminated)	Winter (2014-01-14)	Undisclosed	Free	Free agent
16	(South Korea) Joo Ik-seong	FW	(South Korea) Daejeon Citizen	Transfer	Winter (2014-01-14)	Undisclosed	Undisclosed	
17	(South Korea) Choi Tae-uk	MF	(South Korea) Ulsan Hyundai	Free transfer (Contract expired)	Winter (2014-01-28)	2 years	Trade	Choi Tae-uk↔Kim Dong-suk
18	(Brazil) Adilson dos Santos	DF	N/A	Retirement (Contract expired)	Winter (2014-01-29)			Coach appointed
19	(South Korea) Lee Taig-ki	DF	(South Korea) Chungju Hummel	Free transfer (Contract terminated)	Summer (2014-07-03)	Undisclosed	Free	Free agent
20	(South Korea) Hwang Shin-young	MF	Contract terminated	Unknown	Summer (2014-07-03)			Free agent
21	(South Korea) Kang Jung-hun	FW	(South Korea) Busan Transportation Corporation	Transfer	Summer (2014-07-11)	6 months	Undisclosed	

==== Loan & Military service ====
#	Name	POS	Moving to	Window	Period	Fee	Notes
1	(South Korea) Lee Jae-kwon	MF	(South Korea) Police FC	End of the 2013 season (2013-12-??)	21 months	N/A	
2	(South Korea) Moon Dong-ju	MF	(Japan) Ehime FC	End of the 2013 season (2014-01-20)	1 year	Undisclosed	
3	(South Korea) Cho Min-woo	DF	(South Korea) Gangwon FC	Summer (2014-07-04)	6 months	Undisclosed	
4	(South Korea) Yoon Hyun-oh	MF	(South Korea) Gimhae FC	Summer (2014-07-11)	6 months	Undisclosed	
5	(Brazil) Rafael Costa	FW	(Brazil) Ponte Preta	Summer (2014-07-17)		Undisclosed	

== Tactics ==
=== Starting eleven and formation ===
This section shows the most used players for each position considering a 3–4–2–1 or 3–4–3 formation.

No.	Pos.	Nat.	Name	MS	Notes
1	GK	(South Korea)	Kim Yong-dae		
3	DF	(South Korea)	Lee Woong-hee		
6	DF	(South Korea)	Kim Jin-kyu		
4	DF	(South Korea)	Kim Ju-young		
5	MF	(South Korea)	Cha Du-ri		
22	MF	(South Korea)	Koh Myong-jin		
28	MF	(Spain)	Osmar Ibáñez		
7	MF	(South Korea)	Kim Chi-woo		
13	MF	(South Korea)	Go Yo-han		
24	MF	(South Korea)	Yun Il-lok		
11	FW	(Japan)	Sergio Escudero		

Source: Squad stats and Start formations.
Only competitive matches.
Using the most used start formation.
Ordered by position on pitch (from back right to front left).

=== Substitutes ===
No.	Pos.	Nat.	Name	MS	Notes
31	GK	(South Korea)	Yu Sang-hun		
2	MF	(South Korea)	Choi Hyo-jin		
16	MF	(South Korea)	Lee Sang-hyeob		
27	MF	(South Korea)	Ko Kwang-min		
10	FW	(Brazil)	Éverton Santos		
11	FW	(Colombia)	Mauricio Molina		
19	FW	(South Korea)	Yun Ju-tae		

Source: Squad stats and Start formations.
Only competitive matches.
Using the most used start formation.
Ordered by position on pitch (from back right to front left).

== See also ==
- FC Seoul
