= 2017 FC Seoul season =

FC Seoul
2017 season
- Chairman: Huh Chang-soo
- Manager: Hwang Sun-hong
- Stadium: Seoul World Cup Stadium
- K League Classic: 5th
- AFC Champions League: Group stage
- Top goalscorer: League: Dejan Damjanović (19 goals); All: Dejan Damjanović (22 goals)
Home colours	Away colours

The 2017 season was FC Seoul's 34th season in the K League Classic, the highest level of the South Korean football league system.

== Pre-season ==
- In Guam: From 3 January 2017 to 21 January 2017

=== Pre-season match results ===
Type	Date	Opponents	Result	Score	Scorers	Notes
Lunar New Year Cup	28 January 2017	(New Zealand) Auckland City	L	0–1		
Lunar New Year Cup	31 January 2017	(Thailand) Muangthong United	L	0–1		
Practice matches during winter training spell in Kagoshima, Japan	3 February 2017	(Japan) FC Gifu	L	1–2	(South Korea) Park Chu-young	
Practice matches during winter training spell in Kagoshima, Japan	5 February 2017	(Japan) Kyoto Sanga	W	3–1	(South Korea) Park Chu-young (2), (Brazil) Maurinho	
Practice matches during winter training spell in Kagoshima, Japan	8 February 2017	(Japan) FC Tokyo	L	0–1		
Saitama City Cup	10 February 2017	(Japan) Urawa Red Diamonds	D	1–1	(South Korea) Lee Sang-ho	

== Competitions ==
=== Overview ===
Competition	Starting round	Final position	Record							
Competition	Starting round	Final position	Pld	W	D	L	GF	GA	GD	Win %
K League Classic	Matchday 1	Matchday 38					—			
FA Cup	Round of 32						—			
AFC Champions League	Group stage						—			
Total			0	0	0	0	0	0	+0	—

Last updated: 31 December 2017
Source: Fixtures and Results at FC Seoul Official Website

== Match reports and match highlights ==
Fixtures and Results at FC Seoul Official Website (in English)

== Season statistics ==
=== K League Classic records ===
Season	Teams	Final Position	Pld	W	D	L	GF	GA	GD	Pts	Manager
2017	12	5	38	16	13	9	56	42	14	61	(South Korea) Hwang Sun-hong

=== All competitions records ===
K League Classic	FA Cup	AFC Champions League	Manager
			(South Korea) Hwang Sun-hong

=== Attendance records ===
Season Total Att.	K League Classic Season Total Att.	K League Classic Season Average Att.	FA Cup Total / Average Att.	ACL Total / Average Att.	Att. Ranking	Notes

- Season total attendance is K League Classic, FA Cup, and AFC Champions League combined

== Squad statistics ==
=== Goals ===
Pos	K League Classic	FA Cup	AFC Champions League	Total	Notes
1	(South Korea) Dejan Damjanović (19)	(South Korea)	Dejan Damjanović (3)	Dejan Damjanović (22)	

=== Assists ===
Pos	K League Classic	League Cup	Total	Notes
1	(South Korea) Yun Il-lok (12)	(South Korea)		

== Coaching staff ==
Position	Name	Notes
Manager	(South Korea) Hwang Sun-hong	
Assistant manager	(South Korea) Kang Chul	
First-team coach	(South Korea) Yoon Hee-jun	
First-team coach	(Brazil) Adilson dos Santos	
First-team goalkeeping coach	(South Korea) Kim Il-jin	
Reserve Team Coach	(South Korea) Lee Eul-yong	
Reserve Team Goalkeeping Coach	(South Korea) Back Min-chul	
Fitness coach	(South Korea) Shin Sang-kyu	
U-18 Team Manager	(South Korea) Chung Sang-nam	
U-18 Team Coach	(South Korea) Lee Jung-youl	
U-18 Team Goalkeeping Coach	(South Korea) Weon Jong-teok	
U-15 Team Manager	(South Korea) Kim Young-jin	
U-15 Team Coach	(South Korea) Park Hyuk-soon	
U-15 Team Goalkeeping Coach	(South Korea) Son Il-pyo	
U-15 Team Fitness Coach	(South Korea) Park Sung-jun	
U-12 Team Manager	(South Korea) Kim Byung-chae	
U-12 Team Coach	(South Korea) Seo Ki-man	
U-12 Team Goalkeeping Coach	(South Korea) Lee Ji-hun	
Chief scout	(South Korea) Kim Hyun-tae	
Scout	(South Korea) Lee Won-jun	
Scout	(South Korea) Jung Jae-yoon	
Scout	(South Korea) Seo Min-woo	

== Players ==
=== Team squad ===
All players registered for the 2017 season are listed.

No.	POS	Nationality	Player	Notes
1	GK	South Korea	Yoo Hyun	
2	DF	South Korea	Hwang Hyun-soo	
3	FW	South Korea	Sim Woo-yeon	
4	DF	South Korea	Kim Dong-woo	Out
5	MF	Spain	Osmar	
6	MF	South Korea	Ju Se-jong	Conscripted
7	DF	South Korea	Kim Chi-woo	
8	FW	South Korea	Lee Sang-ho	
9	FW	Montenegro	Dejan Damjanović	
10	FW	South Korea	Park Chu-young (Vice Captain)	
11	FW	South Korea	Yun Il-lok	
13	MF	South Korea	Go Yo-han	
14	MF	South Korea	Cho Chan-ho	
15	MF	South Korea	Kim Won-sik	
16	MF	South Korea	Ha Dae-sung	
17	DF	South Korea	Shin Kwang-hoon	
19	DF	South Korea	Sim Sang-min	
20	DF	South Korea	Jung In-whan	
21	GK	South Korea	Yang Han-been	
22	MF	South Korea	Yoon Seung-won	
23	MF	South Korea	Lee Seok-hyun	
25	DF	South Korea	Jeon Ho-joon	
26	MF	South Korea	Kim Ju-yeong	
27	FW	South Korea	Kim Jeong-hwan	
29	MF	South Korea	Hwang Ki-wook	Out
30	GK	South Korea	Kim Chol-ho	
31	GK	South Korea	Son Moo-been	
32	MF	South Korea	Kim Han-gil	
33	DF	South Korea	Park Min-gyu	
34	FW	Brazil	Maurinho	Out
35	MF	South Korea	Lim Min-hyeok	
36	FW	South Korea	Park Sung-min	
37	MF	South Korea	Song Jin-hyung	In
38	DF	South Korea	Kim Kun-hoan	Out
40	DF	South Korea	Kim Won-gun	
42	FW	South Korea	Park Hee-seong	Discharged
43	DF	South Korea	Yoon Jong-gyu	Out
43	DF	South Korea	Lee Woong-hee	Discharged
44	DF	Iran	Khaled Shafiei	In
45	MF	South Korea	Shin Seong-jae	
55	DF	South Korea	Kwak Tae-hwi (Captain)	
77	FW	Croatia	Ivan Kovačec	In
79	MF	South Korea	Lee Myung-joo	In & Conscripted
88	DF	South Korea	Lee Kyu-ro	

=== Out on loan and military service ===
No.	POS	Nationality	Player	Moving To	Loan Period
—	DF	South Korea	Lee Woong-hee	(South Korea) Sangju Sangmu	2015/11–2017/08
—	FW	South Korea	Park Hee-seong	(South Korea) Sangju Sangmu	2015/11–2017/08
—	MF	South Korea	Sin Jin-ho	(South Korea) Sangju Sangmu	2016/04–2018/01
—	GK	South Korea	Yu Sang-hun	(South Korea) Sangju Sangmu	2016/12–2018/09
—	DF	South Korea	Kim Nam-chun	(South Korea) Sangju Sangmu	2016/12–2018/09
—	FW	South Korea	Yun Ju-tae	(South Korea) Sangju Sangmu	2016/12–2018/09
—	DF	South Korea	Ko Kwang-min	(South Korea) Hwaseong FC	2016/12–2018/09
—	MF	South Korea	Lee Min-kyu	Military Service	2016/12–2018/09
—	FW	South Korea	Shim Je-hyeok	(South Korea) Seongnam FC	2017/01–2017/12
—	MF	South Korea	Kim Min-jun	(South Korea) Gyeongnam FC	2017/01–2017/12
—	DF	South Korea	Yoon Jong-gyu	(South Korea) Gyeongnam FC	2017/06–2017/12

※ In: Transferred from other teams in the middle of the season.
※ Out: Transferred to other teams in the middle of the season.
※ Discharged: Transferred from Sanjgu Sangmu or Ansan Mugunghwa for military service in the middle of the season (registered in 2016 season).
※ Conscripted: Transferred to Sangju Sangmu or Ansan Mugunghwa for military service after the end of the season.

== See also ==
- FC Seoul
