= 2019 FC Seoul season =

FC Seoul
2019 season
- Chairman: Huh Chang-soo
- Manager: Choi Yong-soo
- Stadium: Seoul World Cup Stadium
- K League 1: 3rd
- FA Cup: Round of 32
- Top goalscorer: League: Park Chu-young (10 goals); All: Park Chu-young (12 goals)
Home colours	Away colours

The 2019 season was FC Seoul's 36th season in the K League 1, the highest level of the South Korean football league system.

== Pre-season ==
- In Guam: From 6 to 25 January 2019
- In Kagoshima, Japan: From 30 January 2019 to 22 February 2019

=== Pre-season match results ===
Type	Date	Opponents	Result	Score	Scorers	Notes
Practice matches during winter training spell in Kagoshima, Japan	31 January 2019	(Japan) Ventforet Kofu	D	1–1	(South Korea) Jung Won-jin	
Practice matches during winter training spell in Kagoshima, Japan	3 February 2019	(Japan) Jubilo Iwata	D	1–1	(South Korea) Lee In-gyu	Same day 2 matches
Practice matches during winter training spell in Kagoshima, Japan	3 February 2019	(Japan) Jubilo Iwata	D	0–0		Same day 2 matches
Practice matches during winter training spell in Kagoshima, Japan	6 February 2019	(Japan) Montedio Yamagata	W	3–1	(South Korea) Park Dong-jin (2), (South Korea) Go Yo-han	Same day 2 matches
Practice matches during winter training spell in Kagoshima, Japan	6 February 2019	(Japan) Blaublitz Akita	L	2–3	(South Korea) Ha Dae-sung, (South Korea) Kim Won-sik	Same day 2 matches
Practice matches during winter training spell in Kagoshima, Japan	9 February 2019	(Japan) Shimizu S-Pulse	D	0–0		
Practice matches during winter training spell in Kagoshima, Japan	12 February 2019	(Japan) Sanfrecce Hiroshima	D	1–1	(South Korea) Go Yo-han	
Practice matches during winter training spell in Kagoshima, Japan	14 February 2019	(Japan) Tegevajaro Miyazaki	W	2–0	(South Korea) Lee In-gyu, Kim Won-sik	

== Competitions ==
=== Overview ===
Competition	Starting round	Final position	Record							
Competition	Starting round	Final position	Pld	W	D	L	GF	GA	GD	Win %
K League 1	Matchday 1	Matchday 38					—			
FA Cup	Round of 32						—			
Total			0	0	0	0	0	0	+0	—

Last updated: 31 December 2019
Source: Fixtures and Results at FC Seoul Official Website

== Match reports and match highlights ==
Fixtures and Results at FC Seoul Official Website (in English)

== Season statistics ==
=== K League 1 records ===
Season	Teams	Final Position	Pld	W	D	L	GF	GA	GD	Pts	Manager
2019	12	3	38	15	11	12	53	49	4	56	(South Korea) Choi Yong-soo

=== All competitions records ===
K League 1	FA Cup	AFC Champions League	Manager
			(South Korea) Choi Yong-soo

=== Attendance records ===
Season Total Att.	K League 1 Season Total Att.	K League 1 Season Average Att.	FA Cup Total / Average Att.	ACL Total / Average Att.	Att. Ranking	Notes

- Season total attendance is K League 1, FA Cup, and AFC Champions League combined

== Squad statistics ==
=== Top 5 Goal Scorers ===
Pos	K League 1	FA Cup	AFC Champions League	Total	Notes
1					

=== Top 5 Assist Makers ===
Pos	K League 1	League Cup	Total	Notes
1				

== Coaching staff ==
Position	Name	Notes
Manager	(South Korea) Choi Yong-soo	
Assistant manager	(South Korea) Kim Seong-jae	
First Team Coach	(South Korea) Yoon Hee-jun	
First Team Coach	(South Korea) Park Hyuk-soon	
Reserve Team Coach	(South Korea) Jung Kwang-min	–June 2019
Goalkeeping Coach	(South Korea) Back Min-chul	
Fitness Coach	(South Korea) Lee Jae-hong	
U-18 Team Manager	(South Korea) Myong Jin-young	
U-18 Team Coach	(South Korea) Kim Jin-kyu	
U-18 Team Goalkeeping Coach	(South Korea) Weon Jong-teok	
U-18 Team Fitness Coach	(South Korea) Hwang Ji-hwan	
U-15 Team Manager	(South Korea) Kim Young-jin	
U-15 Team Coach	(South Korea) Yoon Si-ho	
U-15 Team Goalkeeping Coach	(South Korea) Son Il-pyo	
U-15 Team Fitness Coach	(South Korea) Jung Hoon-gi	
U-12 Team Manager	(South Korea) Kim Byung-chae	
U-12 Team Coach	(South Korea) Seo Ki-man	
U-12 Team Goalkeeping Coach	(South Korea) Lee Ji-hun	
Chief Scout	(South Korea) Kim Hyun-tae	
Scout	(South Korea) Lee Won-jun	
Scout	(South Korea) Jung Jae-yoon	

== Players ==
=== Team squad ===
All players registered for the 2019 season are listed.

No.	Pos.	Nationality	Player	Notes
1	GK	South Korea	Yu Sang-hun	
2	DF	South Korea	Hwang Hyun-soo	
3	DF	South Korea	Lee Woong-hee	
4	DF	South Korea	Kim Nam-chun	
5	MF	Spain	Osmar	
6	DF	South Korea	Kim Ju-sung	
7	MF	South Korea]	Shin Jae-won	
8	MF	South Korea	Jung Won-jin	
9	MF	Uzbekistan	Ikromjon Alibaev	
10	FW	South Korea	Park Chu-young	
13	MF	South Korea	Go Yo-han (captain)	
14	FW	South Korea	Kim Han-gil	
15	DF	South Korea	Kim Won-sik	
16	MF	South Korea	Ha Dae-sung	
17	FW	South Korea	Park Hee-seong	
18	FW	South Korea	Cho Young-wook	
19	FW	South Korea	Yun Ju-tae	
20	DF	South Korea	Park Jun-yeong	
21	GK	South Korea	Yang Han-been	
22	MF	South Korea	Yoon Seung-won	
23	MF	South Korea	Yoon Jong-gyu	
24	MF	South Korea	Jung Hyun-cheol	
25	DF	South Korea	Pak Min-gyu	Out
26	MF	South Korea	Lee Seung-jae	
27	MF	South Korea	ko Kwang-min	
28	MF	South Korea	Hwang Ki-wook	
30	GK	South Korea	Jeong Jin-wook	
31	GK	South Korea	Baek Jong-bum	
32	MF	South Korea	Shin Seong-jae	
33	FW	South Korea	Lee In-gyu	
34	MF	South Korea	Lee Hak-seon	
35	DF	South Korea	Jun Woo-ram	
36	FW	South Korea	Park Sung-min	
37	MF	South Korea	Song Jin-hyung	
38	DF	South Korea	Jang Hee-woong	
39	FW	South Korea	Lee Gun-chul	
40	DF	South Korea	Kim Won-gun	
42	MF	South Korea	Koo Chang-mo	
47	FW	South Korea	Kim Woo-hong	
50	FW	South Korea	Park Dong-jin	
66	MF	South Korea	Ju Se-jong	Discharged
72	FW	Serbia	Aleksandar Pešić	
79	FW	South Korea	Lee Myung-joo	Discharged

=== Out on loan and military service ===
No.	Pos.	Nationality	Player	Moving To	Loan Period
—	MF	South Korea	Ju Se-jong	(South Korea) Asan Mugunghwa	January 2018–October 2019
—	MF	South Korea	Lee Myung-joo	(South Korea) Asan Mugunghwa	January 2018–October 2019
—	DF	South Korea	Lee Kyu-ro	(South Korea) FC Pocheon	January 2018–December 2019
—	MF	South Korea	Kim Ju-yeong	(South Korea) Pocheon Citizen	January 2018–June 2020
—	DF	South Korea	Pak Min-gyu	(South Korea) Daejeon Citizen	July 2019–December 2019

Note: Where a player has not declared an international allegiance, nation is determined by place of birth.
※ In: Transferred from other teams in the middle of the season.
※ Out: Transferred to other teams in the middle of the season.
※ Discharged: Transferred from Sanjgu Sangmu or Ansan Mugunghwa for military service in the middle of the season (registered in 2019 season).
※ Conscripted: Transferred to Sangju Sangmu or Ansan Mugunghwa for military service after the end of the season.

== See also ==
- FC Seoul
