= Yun Ju-tae =

South Korean footballer (born 1990)

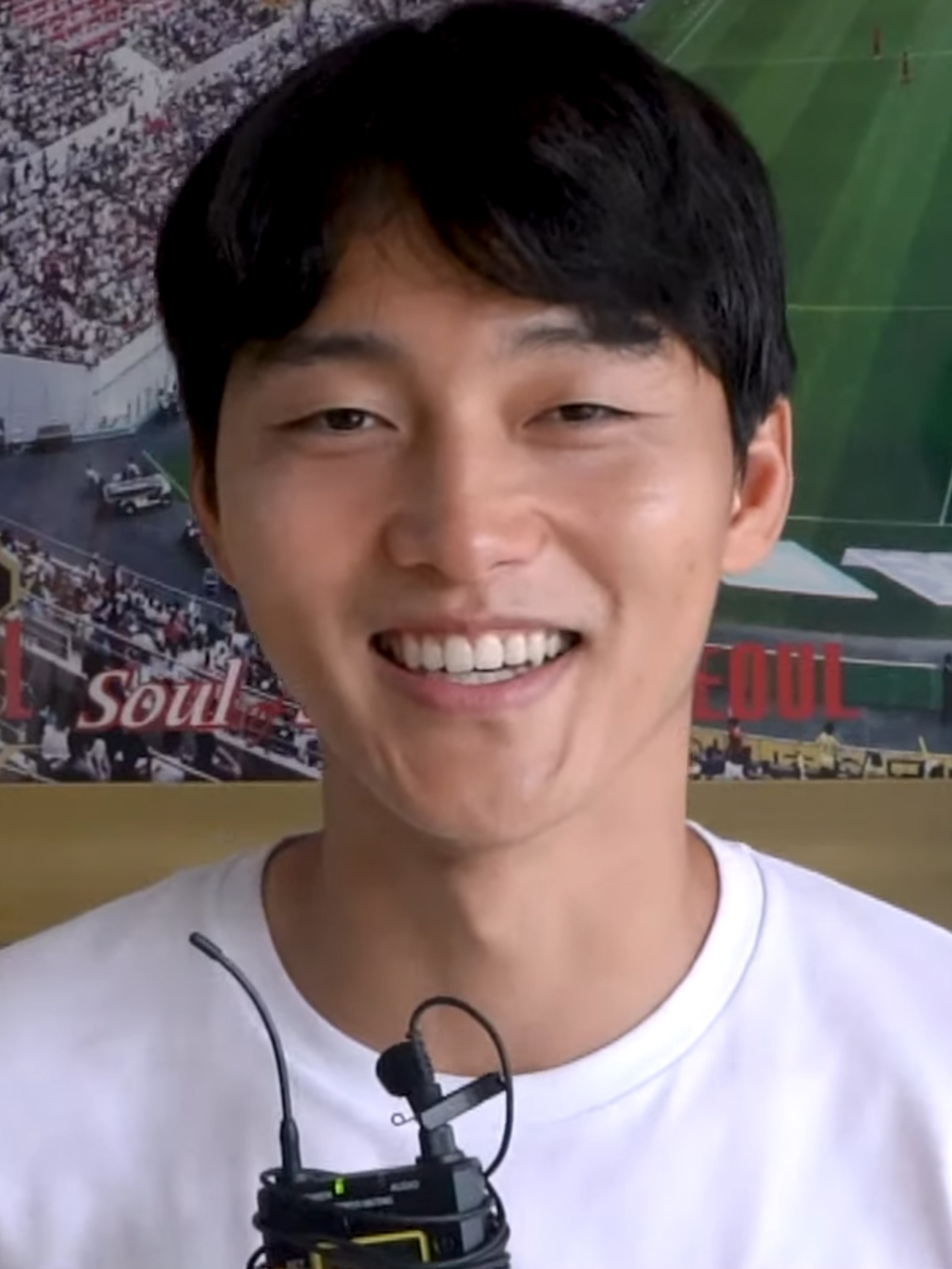
- Yun in 2020

Personal information
- Date of birth: 22 June 1990 (age 36)
- Place of birth: Yangsan, South Korea
- Height: 1.81 m (5 ft 11 in)
- Position: Forward

Team information
- Current team: Gyeongnam FC
- Number: 42

Youth career
- 2009–2011: Yonsei University

Senior career*
Years	Team	Apps	(Gls)
2011–2013	FSV Frankfurt	30	(3)
2013	→ SV Sandhausen (loan)	11	(0)
2014–2020	FC Seoul	94	(20)
2017–2018	→ Sangju Sangmu (military service)	17	(0)
2021–2022	Gyeongnam FC	14	(2)
2023	Ansan Greeners	25	(9)
2024–	Gyeongnam FC	6	(0)
- * Club domestic league appearances and goals as of 21:17, 1 February 2024 (UTC)

Yun Ju-tae (Korean: 윤주태; born 22 June 1990) is a South Korean professional footballer who plays for Gyeongnam FC as a forward.

== Career ==
After attending Yonsei University, Yun signed for German club FSV Frankfurt in May 2011, making his professional debut in the 2011–12 season. He later played for SV Sandhausen and FC Seoul. He made his debut for FC Seoul on 19 March 2014, in their AFC Champions League match against Japanese club Sanfrecce Hiroshima.

He joined Sangju Sangmu to serve his military duty after the end of the 2016 season.

On 31 January 2021, he joined Gyeongnam FC.

On 21 March 2023, he joined Ansan Greeners.

He returned to Gyeongnam for the 2024 season.

== Career statistics ==
As of 22 March 2023

Appearances and goals by club, season and competition
Club	Season	League		Cup		Continental		Other		Total	
Club	Season	Apps	Goals	Apps	Goals	Apps	Goals	Apps	Goals	Apps	Goals
FSV Frankfurt	2011–12	17	2	1	0	0	0	—		18	2
FSV Frankfurt	2012–13	13	1	1	0	0	0	—		14	1
FSV Frankfurt	Total	30	3	2	0	0	0	—		32	3
SV Sandhausen (loan)	2012–13	11	0	0	0	0	0	—		11	0
FC Seoul	2014	10	2	2	1	4	1	—		16	4
FC Seoul	2015	26	9	2	1	3	3	—		31	13
FC Seoul	2016	17	3	2	2	6	1	—		25	6
FC Seoul	Total	53	14	6	4	13	5	—		72	23
Sangju Sangmu	2017	8	0	1	0	—		1	0	10	0
Sangju Sangmu	2018	8	0	0	0	—		—		8	0
Sangju Sangmu	Total	16	0	1	0	—		1	0	18	0
FC Seoul	2018	7	2	0	0	—		2	0	9	2
FC Seoul	2019	14	1	0	0	—		—		14	1
FC Seoul	2020	18	3	1	0	5	3	—		24	6
FC Seoul	Total	39	6	1	0	5	3	2	0	47	9
Gyeongnam FC	2021	14	2	2	0	—		—		16	2
Gyeongnam FC	2022	0	0	0	0	—		—		0	0
Gyeongnam FC	Total	14	2	2	0	0	0	0	0	16	2
Ansan Greeners	2023	25	9	0	0	—		—		25	9
Career total		188	34	12	4	18	8	3	0	221	46
