= Geum Kyo-jin =

South Korean footballer (born 1992)

Personal information
- Full name: Geum Kyo-jin
- Date of birth: 3 January 1992 (age 34)
- Place of birth: South Korea
- Height: 1.75 m (5 ft 9 in)
- Position: Full-back

Youth career
- 2010–2013: Youngnam University

Senior career*
Years	Team	Apps	(Gls)
2014–2015	Daegu FC	17	(2)
2015	Daejeon Citizen	15	(0)
2016	Gyeongju KHNP	4	(0)
2016	FC Seoul	0	(0)
2017	Seoul E-Land	24	(2)
- * Club domestic league appearances and goals as of 1 January 2018

Geum Kyo-jin (Korean: 금교진; born 3 January 1992) is a South Korean footballer who plays as a full-back.

== Career ==
He joined Daegu FC in 2014.
