= Go Yo-han =

South Korean footballer (born 1988)

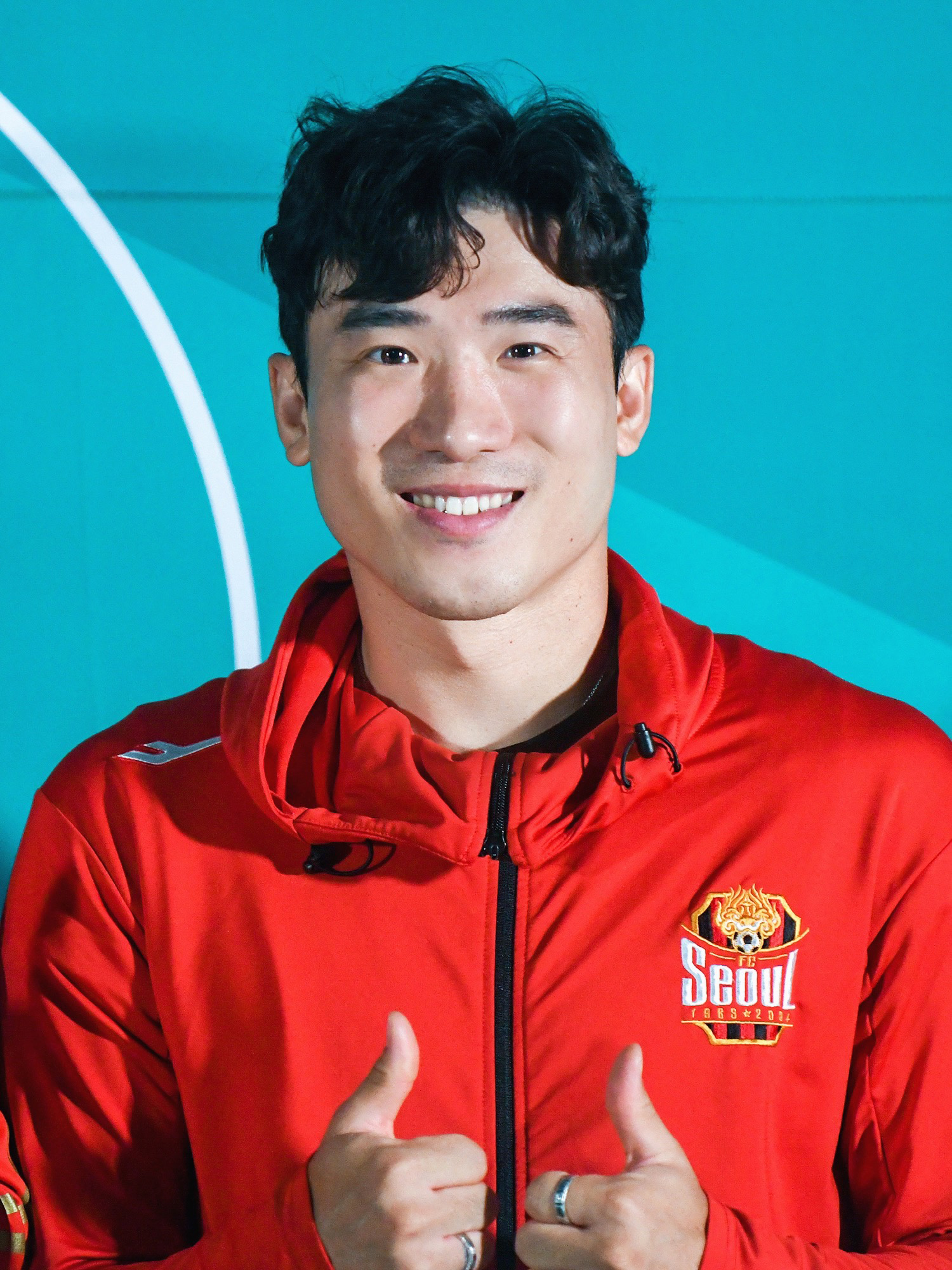
- Go in October 2022

Personal information
- Date of birth: 10 March 1988 (age 38)
- Place of birth: Masan, South Korea
- Height: 1.70 m (5 ft 7 in)
- Positions: Right-back; midfielder

Senior career*
Years	Team	Apps	(Gls)
2004–2023	FC Seoul	350	(31)
2024	Byuksan FC	0	(0)
2025	Seoul Yangcheon TNT FC	0	(0)

International career^{‡}
2003–2004	South Korea U17	7	(0)
2009–2018	South Korea	21	(0)
- * Club domestic league appearances and goals as of 7 June 2023 ‡ National team caps and goals as of 27 June 2018

- Go Yo-han
- Hangul: 고요한
- Hanja: 高余韓
- RR: Go Yohan
- MR: Ko Yohan

Go Yo-han (Korean: 고요한; born 10 March 1988) is a South Korean professional footballer who plays as a right-back.

== Club career ==
In 2004, he dropped out of middle school after failing math class and joined FC Seoul. In 2006, he made his professional league debut in League Cup, after he made 3 appearances and 2 appearances respectively in K-League 2007 and K-League 2008.

On 2 February 2024, FC Seoul announced his retirement.

== International career ==
On 5 October 2009, he was called up first South Korea national team for friendly match against Senegal of 14 October.

In May 2018 he was named in South Korea's preliminary 28 man squad for the 2018 FIFA World Cup in Russia.

On 2 February 2024, FC Seoul officially declared his retirement and retired his jersey number 13, and appointed him as a coach of Osan High School, a U-18 team of FC Seoul.

== Career statistics ==
=== Club ===
As of 31 December 2023

Appearances and goals by club, season and competition
Club	Season	League			Cup		League Cup		Play-offs		Continental		Total	
Club	Season	Division	Apps	Goals	Apps	Goals	Apps	Goals	Apps	Goals	Apps	Goals	Apps	Goals
FC Seoul	2004	K League 1	0	0	0	0	0	0	—		—		0	0
FC Seoul	2005	K League 1	0	0	0	0	0	0	—		—		0	0
FC Seoul	2006	K League 1	0	0	0	0	1	0	—		—		1	0
FC Seoul	2007	K League 1	3	0	0	0	3	0	—		—		6	0
FC Seoul	2008	K League 1	2	0	1	0	2	0	—		—		5	0
FC Seoul	2009	K League 1	14	0	1	0	2	0	—		3 (Note: Appearances in AFC Champions League)	0	20	0
FC Seoul	2010	K League 1	5	1	2	0	2	0	—		—		9	1
FC Seoul	2011	K League 1	18	3	2	0	0	0	1 (Note: Appearance in K League Championship)	0	8	1	29	4
FC Seoul	2012	K League 1	38	1	2	0	—		—		—		40	1
FC Seoul	2013	K League 1	37	5	2	0	—		—		13	1	52	6
FC Seoul	2014	K League 1	32	4	3	0	—		—		9	1	44	5
FC Seoul	2015	K League 1	33	2	2	0	—		—		6	1	41	3
FC Seoul	2016	K League 1	27	2	4	0	—		—		11	2	42	4
FC Seoul	2017	K League 1	28	2	1	0	—		—		5	0	34	2
FC Seoul	2018	K League 1	32	8	2	0	—		2 (Note: Appearances in K League promotion-relegation play-offs)	1	—		36	9
FC Seoul	2019	K League 1	35	3	1	0	—		—		—		36	3
FC Seoul	2020	K League 1	15	0	2	0	—		—		—		17	2
FC Seoul	2021	K League 1	21	0	0	0	—		—		—		21	0
FC Seoul	2022	K League 1	7	0	0	0	—		—		—		0	0
FC Seoul	2023	K League 1	6	0	0	0	—		—		—		6	0
Career total			353	33	25	0	10	0	2	1	55	6	446	40

== Honours ==
=== Club ===
FC Seoul

- K League 1: 2010, 2012, 2016
- FA Cup: 2015
- League Cup: 2006, 2010

=== International ===
South Korea

- EAFF East Asian Cup
  - Winners: 2017

== Personal life ==
Unlike most Korean people, Go does not have a Hanja name. His given name, Yo-han, comes from the Korean translation of John (요한), apostle of Jesus.
