= Song Kyung-sub =

South Korean footballer and coach

Personal information
- Full name: Song Kyung-sub
- Date of birth: 25 February 1971 (age 55)
- Place of birth: South Korea
- Position: Midfielder

Senior career*
Years	Team	Apps	(Gls)
1994–1995	Daewoo Royals	0	(0)
1996	Suwon Samsung Bluewings	2	(0)

Managerial career
- 2016: Jeonnam Dragons
- 2017–2018: Gangwon FC
- * Club domestic league appearances and goals

Song Kyung-sub (Korean: 송경섭; born 25 February 1971) is a South Korean retired footballer and football coach.

== Manager career ==
On 12 August 2018, He was sacked from Gangwon FC
