= Rafael Costa (footballer, born 1987) =

Brazilian footballer

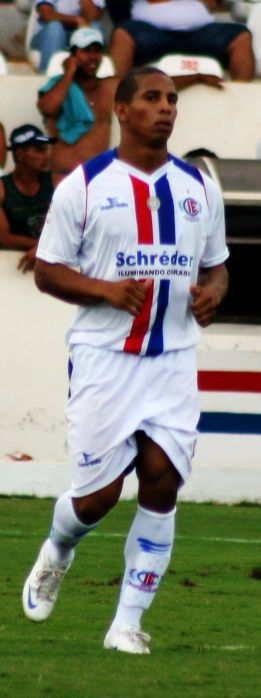
- Costa playing for Itumbiara in 2009

Personal information
- Full name: Rafael Costa dos Santos
- Date of birth: 23 August 1987 (age 39)
- Place of birth: São Luís, Brazil
- Height: 1.78 m (5 ft 10 in)
- Position: Striker

Team information
- Current team: Sampaio Corrêa (on loan from Guarani)

Youth career
- 2006–2007: Força

Senior career*
Years	Team	Apps	(Gls)
2007–2008	Força	0	(0)
2008–2011	Avaí	65	(27)
2009	→ Itumbiara (loan)	0	(0)
2009–2010	→ Mogi Mirim (loan)	4	(0)
2011	→ São José (loan)	2	(0)
2011–2013	Metropolitano	53	(32)
2011	→ Hermann Aichinger (loan)	19	(6)
2013	Figueirense	34	(15)
2014–2015	FC Seoul	14	(2)
2014	→ Ponte Preta (loan)	23	(10)
2015	→ Joinville EC (loan)	14	(2)
2015	→ Ceará SC (loan)	28	(11)
2016–2017	Ceará SC	49	(16)
2018	São Caetano	4	(1)
2018	CRB	16	(1)
2019	Botafogo-SP	33	(12)
2020–	Guarani	49	(8)
2022–	→ Sampaio Corrêa (loan)	3	(0)
- * Club domestic league appearances and goals as of 17:54, 14 April 2022 (UTC)

Rafael Costa dos Santos (born 23 August 1987 in São Luís, Maranhão), simply known as Rafael Costa, is a Brazilian footballer who plays for Sampaio Corrêa, on loan from Guarani as a striker.

== Career ==
Rafael is a striker who was an athlete of the Avaí Futebol Clube, but before he defended the Força Sports Club, football club in São Paulo.

Marked the history of the team from Santa Catarina, for her series on a campaign of conquest access to Series 2009.

In 2009 it was agreed his loan until the end of the year for the Itumbiara of Goiás, but eventually returned to Avaí soon after fighting where the Championship Goiano Itumbiara was third. On August 14, 2009, was borrowed directly by the club on loan at William and Mogi Mirim.

In late April 2010, Rafael returned to perform at Avaí. In its game reestréia the B team for the Copa Avaí of Santa Catarina, one of the goals he scored the team's away win.

In June 2011, Rafael left Avaí for Brasileiro Série D team Metropolitano and had good performances in his three-year stint at the club. In May 2013, he moved to Série B team Figueirense and continued successful playing career.

On 19 January 2014, it was announced that Rafael joined South Korean side FC Seoul. He scored two goals in AFC Champions League

On 15 July 2014, it was announced that Rafael joined Brazilian side Ponte Preta by loan from FC Seoul.

On 7 January 2015, it was announced that Rafael joined Brazilian side Joinville EC by loan from FC Seoul.

On 3 July 2015, it was announced that Rafael joined Brazilian side Ceará Sporting Club by loan from FC Seoul

== Career statistics ==
=== Brazil League ===
(Correct as of October 16, 2013)

Club	Season	State League		Brasileirão		Copa do Brasil		Copa Sudamericana		Total	
Club	Season	Apps	Goals	Apps	Goals	Apps	Goals	Apps	Goals	Apps	Goals
Avaí	2008	-	-	-	-	-	-	-	-	31	7
Avaí	2009	?	?	?	?	-	-	-	-	9	2
Mogi Mirim	2010	4	0	-	-	-	-	-	-	4	0
Avaí	2010	?	?	4	1	-	-	1	0	12	5
Avaí	2011	2	0	-	-	-	-	-	-	2	0
São José	2011	1	0	-	-	-	-	-	-	1	0
Metropolitano	2011	-	-	8	2	-	-	-	-	8	2
Metropolitano	2012	18	14	10	4	-	-	-	-	28	18
Metropolitano	2013	17	12	-	-	-	-	-	-	17	12
Figueirense	2013	-	-	30	14	4	1	-	-	34	15
Total		?	?	?	?	-	-	-	-	146	61

=== K League 1 ===
(Correct as of 5 July 2014)

Club	Season	K League Classic			KFA Cup			League Cup			Continental			Total		
Club	Season	Apps	Goals	Assists	Apps	Goals	Assists	Apps	Goals	Assists	Apps	Goals	Assists	Apps	Goals	Assists
FC Seoul
FC Seoul	2014	9	0	0	1	0	-	-	-	-	5	2	-	15	2	0
Career Total		9	0	0	1	0	-	-	-	-	5	2	-	15	2	0
