= Kim Sang-mun =

South Korean judoka

Personal information
- Nationality: South Korean
- Born: 6 January 1970 (age 55)

Sport
- Sport: Judo

Kim Sang-mun (born 6 January 1970) is a South Korean judoka. He competed in the men's half-lightweight event at the 1992 Summer Olympics.
