= Osmar (footballer, born 1988) =

Spanish footballer

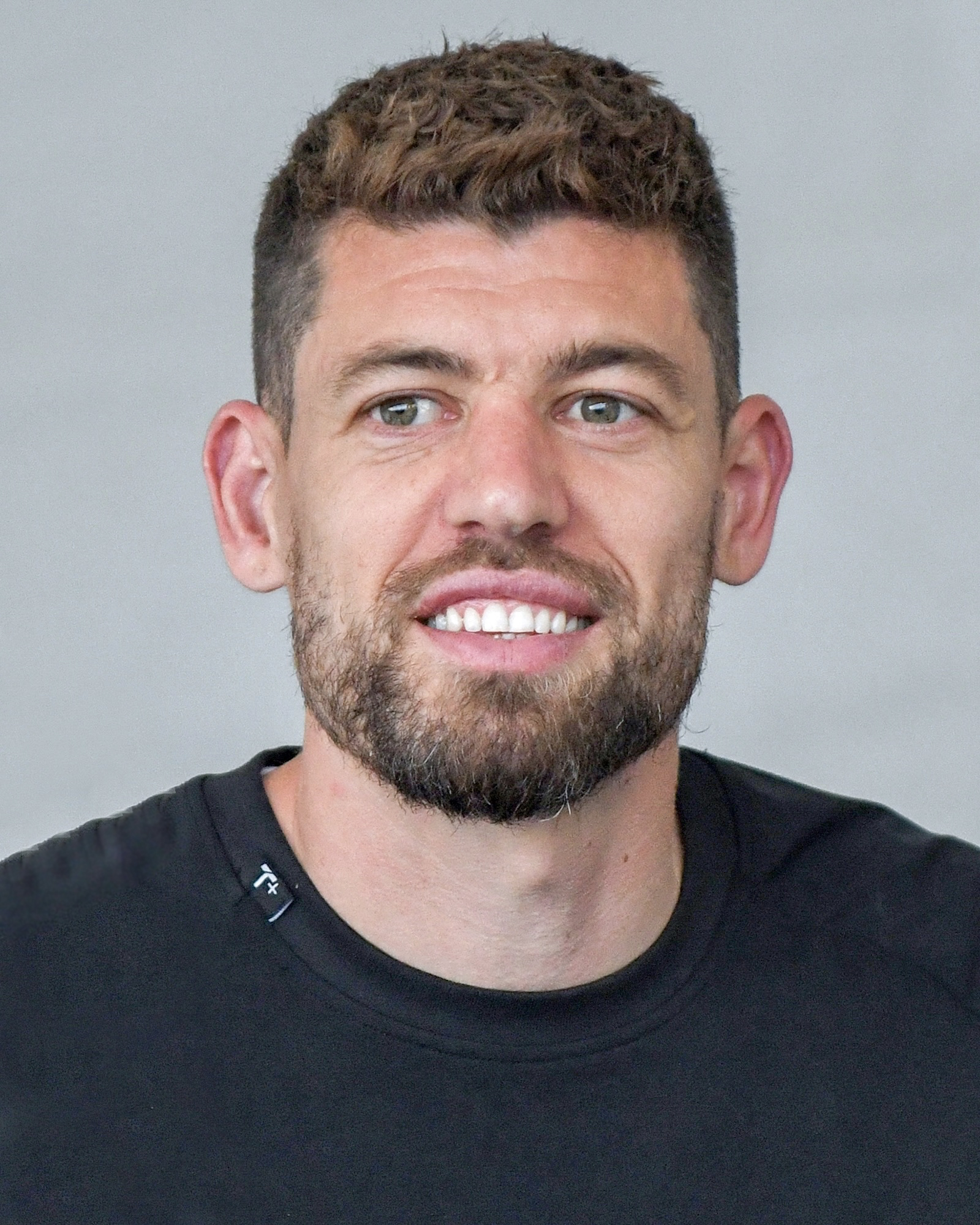
- Osmar in 2024

Personal information
- Full name: Osmar Barba Ibáñez
- Date of birth: 5 June 1988 (age 38)
- Place of birth: Santoña, Spain
- Height: 1.92 m (6 ft 4 in)
- Positions: Defensive midfielder; centre-back

Team information
- Current team: Seoul E-Land
- Number: 5

Youth career
- 2000–2007: Racing Santander

Senior career*
Years	Team	Apps	(Gls)
2007–2010	Racing B	64	(7)
2007–2008	→ Salamanca B (loan)	35	(2)
2009–2012	Racing Santander	13	(0)
2012–2013	Buriram United	34	(6)
2014–2023	FC Seoul	282	(22)
2018	→ Cerezo Osaka (loan)	17	(2)
2024–	Seoul E-Land	72	(12)
- * Club domestic league appearances and goals as of 5 August 2026

Osmar Barba Ibáñez (Spanish pronunciation: [osˈmaɾ iˈβaɲeθ ˈβaɾβa]; (Note: In isolation, Barba is pronounced [ˈbaɾβa].) born 5 June 1988), known simply as Osmar, is a Spanish professional footballer who plays as a defensive midfielder or a central defender for K League 2 club Seoul E-Land.

Developed at Racing de Santander, he spent the vast majority of his career in South Korea, making more than 300 appearances for FC Seoul and winning the 2016 K League Classic with the club. He also played in Thailand and Japan.

== Club career ==
=== Racing Santander ===
Born in Santoña, Osmar was a product of local Racing de Santander's youth system. After a loan stint at CD Salmantino in the Tercera División he returned to his first club for 2008–09, making his senior debut with the reserves in the Segunda División B and being their top scorer; he suffered relegation the following season.

On 8 November 2009, Osmar made his debut with the Cantabrians' first team, starting in a 2–0 La Liga home loss against Athletic Bilbao. He was definitely promoted to the main squad for the 2010–11 campaign, but appeared in only 12 more games across two seasons, with the second ending in relegation.

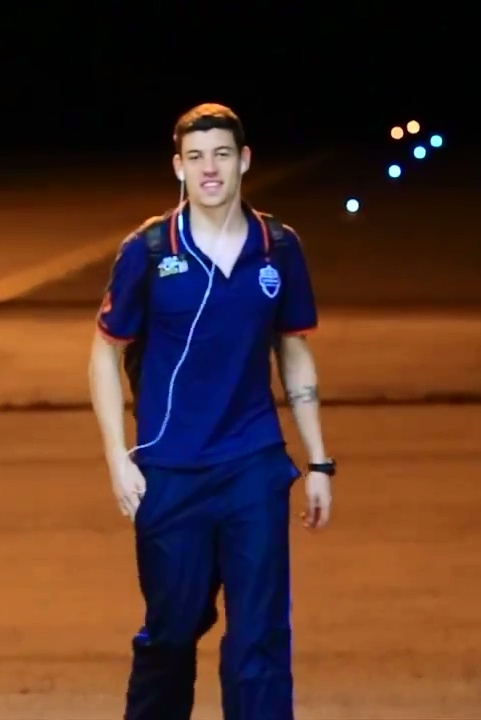
Osmar with Buriram United in 2013

=== Buriram United ===
On 25 July 2012, Osmar signed a two-and-a-half-year contract with Thai Premier League side Buriram United F.C. for an undisclosed fee. He made his debut on 1 August in a Thai FA Cup match against Chonburi FC, going on to win both that tournament and the Thai League Cup in his first year.

Osmar made his debut in the AFC Champions League on 26 February 2013, scoring in the 1–1 group-stage draw at Vegalta Sendai. On 1 May, Buriram became the first team from the nation in a decade to reach the knockout rounds of the tournament, and he topped his side's scorers list at three.

=== South Korea ===
On 31 December 2013, Osmar moved teams and countries again, joining FC Seoul on a three-year deal and becoming the first Spanish footballer to ever play in South Korea. He was appointed vice-captain ahead of the 2015 season, appearing in the all matches and minutes to set a new record for a foreign field player in the K League 1.

Before the start of the following campaign, Osmar was chosen as Seoul's new captain, becoming the first foreigner in its history to hold the position. He helped his side to win the national title, being the first Spanish player to do so in the process.

On 21 February 2018, Osmar agreed to a loan at J1 League's Cerezo Osaka. In December, he signed a new three-year contract with Seoul.

Osmar left the Seoul World Cup Stadium at the end of the 2023 season, after not having his contract renewed. During his spell, he totalled 344 games, 25 goals and 12 assists; at the time of his departure, he held the club record for the highest number of appearances by a foreign player and was second only to Go Yo-han in an all-team list.

On 10 January 2024, Osmar joined Seoul E-Land FC of K League 2.

== Career statistics ==
As of match played 26 November 2025

Appearances and goals by club, season and competition
Club	Season	League			National cup		League cup		Continental (Note: Includes AFC Champions League)		Other		Total	
Club	Season	Division	Apps	Goals	Apps	Goals	Apps	Goals	Apps	Goals	Apps	Goals	Apps	Goals
Racing B	2008–09	Segunda División B	30	6	—		—		—		—		30	6
Racing B	2009–10	Segunda División B	32	1	—		—		—		—		32	1
Racing B	Total		62	7	—		—		—		—		62	7
Racing Santander	2009–10	La Liga	1	0	1	0	—		—		—		2	0
Racing Santander	2010–11	La Liga	4	0	0	0	—		—		—		4	0
Racing Santander	2011–12	La Liga	8	0	3	0	—		—		—		11	0
Racing Santander	Total		13	0	4	0	—		—		—		17	0
Buriram United	2012	Thai Premier League	4	0	1	0			—		—		5	0
Buriram United	2013	Thai Premier League	30	6	10	3			10	3	—		50	12
Buriram United	Total		34	6	11	3			10	3	—		55	12
FC Seoul	2014	K League Classic	34	2	4	0	—		11	1	—		49	3
FC Seoul	2015	K League Classic	38	3	3	0	—		7	1	—		48	4
FC Seoul	2016	K League Classic	37	4	6	0	—		11	0	—		54	4
FC Seoul	2017	K League Classic	33	4	2	0	—		4	0	—		39	4
FC Seoul	2019	K League 1	31	4	1	0	—		—		—		32	4
FC Seoul	2020	K League 1	15	1	1	0	—		6	1	—		22	2
FC Seoul	2021	K League 1	35	1	1	0	—		—		—		36	1
FC Seoul	2022	K League 1	24	1	5	0	—		—		—		29	1
FC Seoul	2023	K League 1	35	2	0	0	—		—		—		35	2
FC Seoul	Total		282	22	23	0	—		39	3	—		344	25
Cerezo Osaka (loan)	2018	J1 League	17	2	3	0	2	0	0	0	1	0	23	2
Seoul E-Land	2024	K League 2	28	7	0	0	—		—		3	1	31	8
Seoul E-Land	2025	K League 2	36	3	0	0	—		—		1	0	37	3
Seoul E-Land	Total		64	10	0	0	—		—		4	1	68	11
Career total			472	47	41	3	2	0	49	6	5	1	569	57

== Honours ==
Buriram United

- Thai Premier League: 2013
- Thai FA Cup: 2012, 2013
- Thai League Cup: 2012, 2013
- Kor Royal Cup: 2013

FC Seoul

- K League 1: 2016
- Korean FA Cup: 2015

Individual

- Fans' AFC Champions League XI: 2016
- Thai Premier League Defender of the Year: 2013
- Thai Premier League Best XI: 2013
- K League Best XI: 2016
