= Yun Il-lok =

South Korean footballer (born 1992)

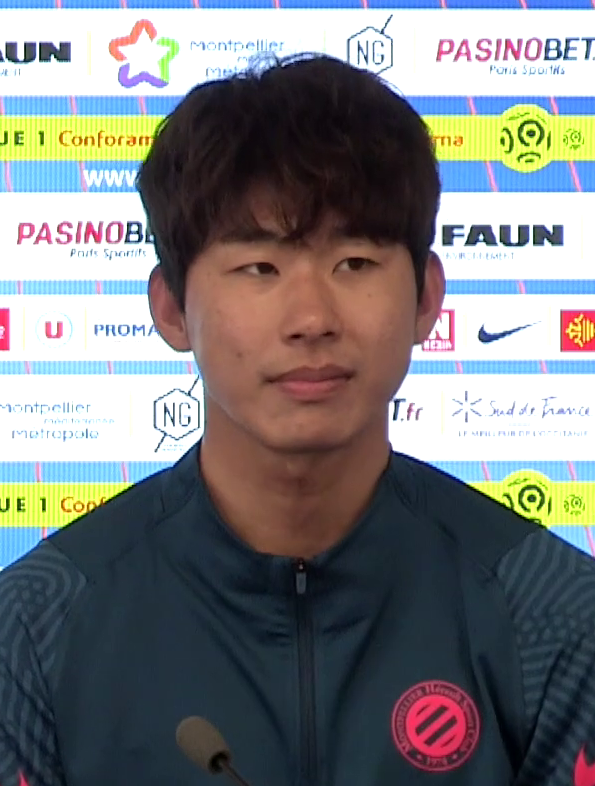
- Yun in 2020

Personal information
- Date of birth: 7 March 1992 (age 34)
- Place of birth: Gwangju, South Korea
- Height: 1.78 m (5 ft 10 in)
- Position: Winger

Team information
- Current team: Gyeongnam FC
- Number: 24

Youth career
- 2008–2010: Gyeongnam FC Youth

Senior career*
Years	Team	Apps	(Gls)
2011–2012	Gyeongnam FC	63	(10)
2013–2017	FC Seoul	137	(21)
2018–2019	Yokohama F. Marinos	16	(0)
2019	→ Jeju United (loan)	34	(11)
2020–2021	Montpellier	17	(0)
2021–2025	Ulsan Hyundai	53	(1)
2023	Gangwon FC (Loan)	6	(0)
2025	Gangwon	6	(0)
2026–	Gyeongnam FC	12	(1)

International career^{‡}
2009	South Korea U17	11	(0)
2010–2011	South Korea U20	15	(0)
2011–2014	South Korea U23	14	(4)
2013–2019	South Korea	10	(1)
Medal record
Representing South Korea
Men's football
Asian Games
Gold medal – first place	2014 Incheon	Team
- * Club domestic league appearances and goals as of 6 August 2026 ‡ National team caps and goals as of 15 December 2019

Yun Il-lok (Korean: 윤일록; Hanja: 尹日録; born 7 March 1992) is a South Korean professional footballer who plays for Gyeongnam FC in the South Korean K League 2. He has played for a number of youth-level teams representing South Korea, and in 2013 graduated to his country's senior men's side, winning the EAFF E-1 Football Championship in 2017 and 2019 as well as gold medal at the 2014 Asian Games.

== Club career ==
Yun entered professional football as a teenager, being selected by Gyeongnam FC as part of their squad for the 2011 season, having spent his youth career with Gyeongnam's U-18 side. His professional debut came almost immediately, in his club's second K-League match of the season against Ulsan, which ended in a 1–0 victory for Gyeongnam. Within a month, Yun scored his first K-League goal in Gyeongnam's 2–1 win over Incheon United.

In January 2020, following the expiry of his contract at Yokohama, Yun moved to Europe where he joined the French club Montpellier on a free transfer.

== International career ==
Yun represented South Korea at the 2009 FIFA U-17 World Cup in Nigeria, playing all five matches as Korea progressed from the group stage to the quarterfinals. There, the team's run came to an end against the host nation and eventual finalist. Yun played a notable part in the round of 16 match against Mexico, when late in the second half his assist led to the equalising goal in the match, forcing extra time after which Korea won the subsequent penalty shootout. Yun regards this assist as his most memorable moment in football.

Yun was also selected for the squad for the 2011 FIFA U-20 World Cup hosted by Colombia. After progressing through the group stages of the competition, Korea met Spain in the Round of 16 where they lost in a penalty shoot-out. Yun played in all four matches of the tournament. Yun was also called up for duty with the South Korea U-23 team, playing in a friendly against Uzbekistan in which he scored a goal as well as an Olympic Final Qualifier against Qatar in November 2011.

Yun has since graduated to the senior men's squad, scoring a goal in the EAFF East Asian Cup against Japan in his sides 2-1 loss on 28 July 2013.

== Career statistics ==
=== Club ===
As of 14 September 2022

Appearances and goals by club, season and competition
Club	Season	League			Cup		League Cup		Continental		Total	
Club	Season	Division	Apps	Goals	Apps	Goals	Apps	Goals	Apps	Goals	Apps	Goals
Gyeongnam FC	2011	K League	21	4	1	0	5	0	—		27	4
Gyeongnam FC	2012	K League	42	6	4	2	—		—		46	8
Gyeongnam FC	Total		63	10	5	2	5	0	0	0	73	12
FC Seoul	2013	K League Classic	29	2	2	0	—		10	4	41	6
FC Seoul	2014	K League Classic	27	7	3	0	—		10	3	40	10
FC Seoul	2015	K League Classic	20	1	4	0	—		8	1	32	2
FC Seoul	2016	K League Classic	26	6	5	0	—		5	0	36	6
FC Seoul	2017	K League Classic	35	5	2	2	—		4	2	41	9
FC Seoul	Total		137	21	16	2	0	0	37	10	190	33
Yokohama F. Marinos	2018	J1 League	16	0	3	0	8	0	—		27	0
Jeju United (loan)	2019	K League 1	34	11	1	0	—		—		35	11
Montpellier	2019–20	Ligue 1	5	0	0	0	0	0	—		5	0
Montpellier	2020–21	Ligue 1	12	0	1	0	0	0	—		13	0
Montpellier	Total		17	0	1	0	0	0	0	0	18	0
Ulsan Hyundai	2021	K League 1	12	0	2	1	—		3	2	17	3
Ulsan Hyundai	2022	K League 1	14	1	2	0	—		7	2	23	3
Ulsan Hyundai	2023	K League 1	0	0	0	0	—		0	0	0	0
Ulsan Hyundai	Total		26	1	4	1	0	0	10	4	40	6
Career total			293	45	30	5	13	0	47	14	383	62

=== International ===
Scores and results list South Korea's goal tally first, score column indicates score after each Yun goal.

List of international goals scored by Yun Il-lok
No.	Date	Venue	Opponent	Score	Result	Competition
1	28 July 2013	Seoul Olympic Stadium, Seoul, South Korea	Japan	1–1	1–2	2013 EAFF East Asian Cup

== Honours ==
=== Club ===
FC Seoul

- Korean FA Cup: 2015
- K League 1: 2016

Ulsan Hyundai

- K League 1: 2022

=== International ===
South Korea U23

- Asian Games: 2014

South Korea

- EAFF E-1 Football Championship: 2017, 2019
