= Yoon Seung-won =

South Korean footballer (born 1995)

Personal information
- Full name: Yoon Seung-won
- Date of birth: 11 February 1995 (age 31)
- Place of birth: South Korea
- Height: 1.86 m (6 ft 1 in)
- Position: Midfielder

Youth career
- 2011–2013: FC Seoul

Senior career*
Years	Team	Apps	(Gls)
2014–2019	FC Seoul	28	(3)
2014	→ Gimhae FC (loan)	8	(1)
2020	Daejeon Hana Citizen	7	(2)

International career^{‡}
2011	South Korea U17	3	(1)
2013	South Korea U20	1	(0)
2018	South Korea U23	5	(0)
- * Club domestic league appearances and goals as of 5 December 2019 ‡ National team caps and goals as of 17 February 2018

- Yoon Seung-won
- Hangul: 윤승원
- Hanja: 尹承圓
- RR: Yun Seungwon
- MR: Yun Sŭngwŏn

Yoon Seung-won (Korean: 윤승원; born 11 February 1995) is a South Korean football player. Until 2014, he was known as Yoon Hyun-oh.

== Club career ==
Yoon joined FC Seoul in 2014 and made his league debut against Jeonbuk Hyundai Motors on 3 November 2016.

== Club career statistics ==
Club performance			League		Cup		continental		Total	
Season	Club	League	Apps	Goals	Apps	Goals	Apps	Goals	Apps	Goals
South Korea			League		KFA Cup		Asia		Total	
2014	FC Seoul	K League 1	0	0	0	0	0	0	0	0
2014	Gimhae FC	Korea National League	8	1	0	0	0	0	8	1
2015	FC Seoul	K League 1	0	0	0	0	0	0	0	0
2016	FC Seoul	K League 1	1	0	1	1	0	0	2	1
2017	FC Seoul	K League 1	8	2	0	0	0	0	8	2
Total	South Korea		1	0	1	1	0	0	2	1
Career total			9	1	1	1	0	0	10	2
