= Park Hee-seong =

South Korean footballer (born 1990)

Personal information
- Full name: Park Hee-seong
- Date of birth: April 7, 1990 (age 36)
- Place of birth: Yeosu, South Jeolla, South Korea
- Height: 1.88 m (6 ft 2 in)
- Position: Forward

Team information
- Current team: Jeonnam Dragons
- Number: 12

Youth career
- 2009–2012: Korea University

Senior career*
Years	Team	Apps	(Gls)
2013–2019	FC Seoul	48	(4)
2016–2017	→ Sangju Sangmu (Military service)	20	(3)
2020	Gimhae FC	21	(9)
2021-	Jeonnam Dragons	17	(0)

International career
2008–2009	South Korea U-20	14	(1)
2009–2011	South Korea U-23	5	(1)
- * Club domestic league appearances and goals as of 11 December 2021

- Park Hee-seong
- Hangul: 박희성
- Hanja: 朴喜星
- RR: Bak Huiseong
- MR: Pak Hŭisŏng

Park Hee-seong (born April 7, 1990) is a South Korean football player who plays for Jeonnam Dragons.

He joined FC Seoul in 2013.
