= Ko Kwang-min (footballer) =

South Korean footballer (born 1988)

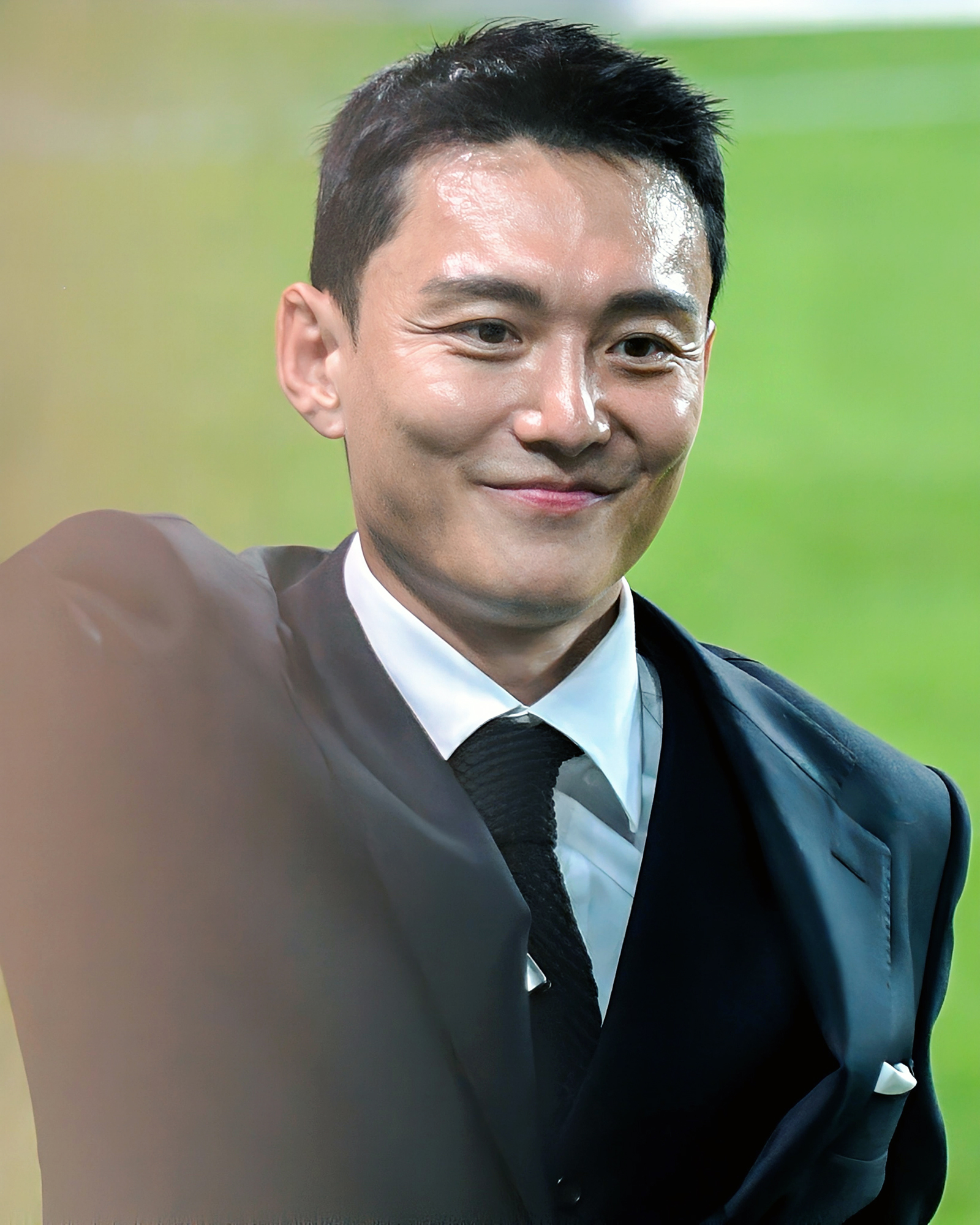
- Ko in 2025

Personal information
- Date of birth: 21 September 1988 (age 38)
- Place of birth: Seoul, South Korea
- Height: 1.72 m (5 ft 7 1/2 in)
- Positions: Winger; wing-back

Youth career
- 2007–2010: Ajou University

Senior career*
Years	Team	Apps	(Gls)
2011–2022	FC Seoul	187	(5)
2017–2018	→ Hwaseong FC (loan)	35	(0)
2018	→ Yangpyeong FC (loan)	22	(0)
2023–2025	Sabah	40	(1)
- * Club domestic league appearances and goals as of 30 July 2023 ‡ National team caps and goals as of 18 February 2023

- Ko Kwang-min
- Hangul: 고광민
- Hanja: 高光民
- RR: Go Gwangmin
- MR: Ko Kwangmin

Ko Kwang-min (Korean: 고광민; Korean pronunciation: [ko.ɡwaŋ.min] or [ko] [kwaŋ.min]; born 21 September 1988) is a South Korean footballer who plays as a midfielder.

== Club career ==
In 2011, Ko Kwang-min joined FC Seoul

He recorded assist in Group stage of 2013 AFC Champions League.

He scored 2 goals in 2014 Korean FA Cup.

On 18 February 2023, Ko Kwang-min joined Sabah in the Malaysia Super League.

== International career ==
Ko got his first call up to the senior South Korea side for 2018 FIFA World Cup qualifiers against Qatar and Iran in October 2016.

== Career statistics ==
As of match played 20 November 2023

Appearances and goals by club, season and competition
Club	Season	League			National cup		League cup		Continental		Other		Total	
Club	Season	Division	Apps	Goals	Apps	Goals	Apps	Goals	Apps	Goals	Apps	Goals	Apps	Goals
FC Seoul	2011	K League 1	6	0	1	0	1	0	2	0	—		10	0
FC Seoul	2012	K League 1	11	0	0	0	—		—		—		11	0
FC Seoul	2013	K League 1	3	0	2	0	—		3	0	—		8	0
FC Seoul	2014	K League 1	20	1	5	2	—		6	0	—		31	3
FC Seoul	2015	K League 1	28	0	3	0	—		6	0	—		37	0
FC Seoul	2016	K League 1	33	1	6	0	—		11	1	—		50	2
FC Seoul	2019	K League 1	35	1	1	0	—		—		—		36	1
FC Seoul	2020	K League 1	23	1	2	0	—		7	0	—		32	1
FC Seoul	2021	K League 1	18	0	1	0	—		—		—		19	0
FC Seoul	2022	K League 1	10	1	2	0	—		—		—		12	1
FC Seoul	Total		187	5	23	2	1	0	35	1	—		246	8
Hwaseong FC (loan)	2017	K3 League Advanced	35	0	1	0	—		—		—		36	0
Yangpyeong FC (loan)	2018	K3 League Advanced	22	0	3	0	—		—		—		25	0
Sabah	2023	Malaysia Super League	20	0	2	0	4	0	—		—		26	0
Career total			264	5	29	2	5	0	35	1	0	0	333	8
