= 2020 FC Seoul season =

FC Seoul
2020 season
- Chairman: Huh Tae-soo
- Manager: Choi Yong-soo
- Stadium: Seoul World Cup Stadium
- K League 1: 8th
- Top goalscorer: League: Park Chu-young (5 goals); All: Park Chu-young (5 goals)
- Lowest home attendance: 0
Home colours	Away colours	Third colours

The 2020 season was South Korean club FC Seoul's 37th season in the K League 1, the highest level of the South Korean football league system.

== Pre-season ==
- In Algarve, Portugal: From 30 December 2019 to 21 January 2020

=== Pre-season match results ===
Type	Date	Opponents	Result	Score	Scorers	Notes
Practice matches during winter training spell in Algarve, Portugal	10 January 2020	(Germany) VfL Wolfsburg	D	1–1	(South Korea) Kim Min-su	
Practice matches during winter training spell in Algarve, Portugal	11 January 2020	(Switzerland) Servette FC	L	1–2	(Uzbekistan) Ikromjon Alibaev	
Practice matches during winter training spell in Algarve, Portugal	16 January 2020	(Germany) Hamburger SV	D	1–1	(Uzbekistan) Ikromjon Alibaev	
Practice matches during winter training spell in Algarve, Portugal	19 January 2020	(England) Brentford F.C.	D	3–3	(South Korea) Yang Yu-mim, Han Chan-hee, Park Dong-jin	
Practice matches during winter training spell in Kagoshima, Japan	31 January 2019	(Japan) Ventforet Kofu	D	2–2	(South Korea) Park Chu-young, Park Dong-jin	
Practice matches during winter training spell in Kagoshima, Japan	3 February 2019	(Japan) Sanfrecce Hiroshima	L	0–1	(South Korea) Lee In-gyu	3 quarters match

== Competitions ==
=== Overview ===
Competition	Starting round	Final position	Record							
Competition	Starting round	Final position	Pld	W	D	L	GF	GA	GD	Win %
K League 1	Matchday 1	Matchday 27					—			
FA Cup	Round of 16						—			
AFC Champions League	Group stage						—			
Total			0	0	0	0	0	0	+0	—

Last updated: 31 December 2020
Source: Fixtures and Results at FC Seoul Official Website

=== K League 1 ===
==== League table ====
Pos	Team	Pld	W	D	L	GF	GA	GD	Pts	Qualification or relegation (Note: Teams are split into two groups (Final A and Final B) after each have played 22 matches.)
7	Gangwon FC	27	9	7	11	36	41	−5	34	
8	Suwon Samsung Bluewings	27	8	7	12	27	30	−3	31	
9	FC Seoul	27	8	5	14	23	44	−21	29	
10	Seongnam FC	27	7	7	13	24	37	−13	28	
11	Incheon United	27	7	6	14	25	35	−10	27	

Source: K League
Rules for classification: 1) Points; 2) Goals scored; 3) Goal difference; 4) Wins; 5) Head-to-head points

==== Results summary ====
Overall								Home						Away					
Pld	W	D	L	GF	GA	GD	Pts	W	D	L	GF	GA	GD	W	D	L	GF	GA	GD
27	8	5	14	23	44	−21	29	5	3	6	13	17	−4	3	2	8	10	27	−17

==== Results by round ====
Round	1	2	3	4	5	6	7	8	9	10	11	12	13	14	15	16	17	18	19	20	21	22	23	24	25	26	27
Ground	A	H	A	H	H	A	A	H	H	A	A	H	A	A	H	H	A	A	H	H	A	H	A	H	A	H	H
Result	L	W	W	L	L	L	L	L	W	D	L	L	L	W	W	W	D	W	L	D	L	D	L	L	W	D	L
Position	8	6	2	7	7	9	10	10	9	9	10	11	11	11	7	6	6	8	7	7	7	7	7	9	7	7	8

Updated to match(es) played on 31 October 2020. Source:
A = Away; H = Home; W = Win; D = Draw; L = Loss

==== Matches ====
Date	Opponents	H / A	Result F – A	Scorers	Attendance	League position
10 May	Gangwon	A	1–3	Park 36'	0	8th
17 May	Gwangju	H	1–0	Han Chan-hee 65', Park Dong-jin (yellow card) 75'	0	6th
22 May	Pohang	A	2–1	Hwang Hyun-soo 35', Go Yo-han (yellow card) 56', Osmar 74', Kim Ju-sung (yellow card) 90+4'	0	2nd
31 May	Seongnam	H	0–1		0	7th
6 June	Jeonbuk	H	1–4	Park Chu-Young 45+2', Kim Nam-Chun (yellow card) 65'	0	7th
14 June	Daegu	A	0–6		0	9th
17 June	Sangju Sangmu	A	0–1		0	10th
20 June	Ulsan	H	0–2		0	10th
27 June	Incheon	H	1–0	Yun Ju-tae 65'	0	9th
4 July	Suwon	A	3–3	Yun Young-sun (yellow card) 7'; Park Chu-young 29', Cho Young-wook 61', Ko Kwang-min 65', Kim Nam-Chun (yellow card) 70'	0	9th
10 July	Busan	A	0–2		0	10th
18 July	Pohang	H	1–3	Cho Young-wook 38'	0	11th
26 July	Jeonbuk	A	0–3		0	11th
1 August	Seongnam	A	2–1	Yun Ju-tae 27', 71'	986	11th
7 August	Gangwon	H	2–0	Jung Han-min 39', Han Seung-gyu 71'	2,329	7th
15 August	Sangju	H	2–1	Kim Won-sik 24', Han Seung-gyu 48'	2,629	6th
22 August	Gwangju	A	0–0		0	6th
30 August	Ulsan Hyundai	A	0–3		0	8th
5 September	Busan	H	1–1	Tursunov (o.g.) 25'	0	8th
13 September	Suwon	H	2–1	Jo Sung-jin (o.g.) 7', Han Seung-gyu 62'	0	6th
16 September	Incheon	A	0–1		0	7th
20 September	Daegu	H	0–0		0	7th

=== Group table ===
Pos	Team	Pld	W	D	L	GF	GA	GD	Pts	Qualification or relegation
1	Gangwon FC	27	9	7	11	36	41	−5	34	
2	Suwon Samsung Bluewings	27	8	7	12	27	30	−3	31	
3	FC Seoul	27	8	5	14	23	44	−21	29	
4	Seongnam FC	27	7	7	13	24	37	−13	28	
5	Incheon United	27	7	6	14	25	35	−10	27	
6	Busan IPark	27	5	10	12	25	38	−13	25	Relegation to K League 2

Updated to match(es) played on 31 October 2020. Source: K League
Rules for classification: 1) Points; 2) Goals scored; 3) Goal difference; 4) Number of wins; 5) Head-to-head points.

==== Matches ====
Date	Opponents	H / A	Result F – A	Scorers	Attendance	League position
26 September	Suwon	A	1–3	Park Chu-young 54'	0	7
4 October	Busan IPark	H	1–2	Jung Han-min 67'	0	9
17 October	Seongnam	A	1–0	Park Chu-young 82'	1,535	7
24 October	Gangwon	H	1–1	Park Chu-young 82'	2,421	7
31 October	Incheon	H	0–1		5,485	8

=== FA Cup ===
Round	Date	Opponents	H / A	Result F – A	Scorers	Attendance
Round of 16	15 July	Daejeon Citizen	A	1–1	Park Chu-Young 83'	0
Quarter-finals	29 July	Pohang	H	1–5	Jung Hyun-Cheol 33'	0

=== AFC Champions League ===
==== Tables ====
Pos	Team	Pld	W	D	L	GF	GA	GD	Pts	Qualification
1	(China) Beijing Guoan	6	5	1	0	12	4	+8	16	Advance to knockout stage
2	(Australia) Melbourne Victory	6	2	1	3	6	9	−3	7	Advance to knockout stage
3	(South Korea) FC Seoul	6	2	0	4	10	9	+1	6	
4	(Thailand) Chiangrai United	6	1	2	3	5	11	−6	5	

Source: AFC
Rules for classification: Tiebreakers

==== Results ====
Round	Date	Opponents	H / A	Result F – A	Scorers	Attendance
Group Stage	18 November	Melbourne Victory	H	1–0	Park Chu-Young 8'	5,229
Group Stage	21 November	Beijing FC	N	1–2	Park Chu-Young 66' (pen.)	0
Group Stage	24 November	Chiangrai United	N	5–0	Han Seung-gyu 20', Jung Han-min 54', Yun Ju-tae 67', 71', Lee In-kyu 90+2'	0
Group Stage	27 November	Chiangrai United	N	1-2	Park Chu-Young 59'	0
Group Stage	30 November	Beijing FC	N	1-3	Yun Ju-tae 89'	0
Group Stage	3 December	Melbourne Victory	N	1-2	Hwang Hyun-soo 64'	0

== Match reports and match highlights ==
Fixtures and Results at FC Seoul Official Website (in English)

== Season statistics ==
=== K League 1 records ===
Season	Teams	Final Position	Pld	W	D	L	GF	GA	GD	Pts	Manager
2020	12	8th	27	8	5	14	23	44	–21	29	(South Korea) Choi Yong-soo

=== All competitions records ===
K League 1	FA Cup	AFC Champions League	Manager
			(South Korea) Choi Yong-soo

=== Attendance records ===
Season Total Att.	K League 1 Season Total Att.	K League 1 Season Average Att.	FA Cup Total / Average Att.	ACL Total / Average Att.	Att. Ranking	Notes

- Season total attendance is K League 1, FA Cup, and AFC Champions League combined

== Squad statistics ==
=== Goals ===
Pos	K League 1	Goals	FA Cup	Goals	AFC Champions League	Goals	Total	Notes
1	(South Korea) Park Chu-young	5			(South Korea) Park Chu-young	2	7	
2	(South Korea) Yun Ju-tae	3	(South Korea) Jung Hyun-cheol	1	(South Korea) Park Chu-young	1	5	
2	(South Korea) Han Seung-gyu	3	(South Korea) Park Chu-young	1			4	
4	(South Korea) Park Dong-jin	1					1	
4	(South Korea) Han Chan-hee	1					1	
4	(South Korea) Hwang Hyun-soo	1					1	
4	(Spain) Osmar Barba	1					1	
4	(South Korea) Yun Ju-tae	1					1	
4	(South Korea) Cho Young-wook	1					1	
4	(South Korea) Jung Han-min	1					1	
4	(South Korea) Kim Won-sik	1					1	
4	(South Korea) Jung Han-min	1					1	
TOTAL		20		2		3	25	

=== Assists ===
Pos	Players	K League 1	FA Cup	AFC Champions League	Total	Notes
1	(Spain) Osmar Barba	1			1	
1	(South Korea) Kim Jin-ya	1			1	
1	(South Korea) Han Seung-gyu	1			1	
1	(South Korea) Yun Ju-Tae	1			1	
1	(South Korea) Kim Jin-ya	1			1	
1	(South Korea) Ju Se-jong		1		1	
1	(South Korea) Park Chu-young			1	1	
1	(South Korea) Jung Han-min			1	1	
1	(South Korea) Yun Ju-tae			1	1	
TOTAL		5	1	3	9	

== Coaching staff ==
=== Choi Yong-soo era (~30 July 2020) ===
Position	Name	Notes
Manager	(South Korea) Choi Yong-soo	
Assistant manager	(South Korea) Kim Seong-jae	–May 2020
Assistant manager	(South Korea) Kim Ho-young	19 June 2020~
First Team Coach	(South Korea) Yoon Hee-jun	–May 2020
First Team Coach	(South Korea) Park Hyuk-soon	
First Team Coach	(South Korea) Kim Jin-kyu	3 June 2020–
Reserve Team Coach	(South Korea) Lee Jung-youl	
Goalkeeping Coach	(South Korea) Shin Bum-chul	
Fitness Coach	(Portugal) Manuel Rodrigues	
U-18 Team Manager	(South Korea) Cha Du-ri	
U-18 Team Coach	(South Korea) Kim Jin-kyu	–3 June 2020
U-18 Team Goalkeeping Coach	(South Korea) Bang Hyung-gon	
U-18 Team Fitness Coach	(South Korea) Hwang Ji-hwan	
U-18 Team Performance Analyst	(South Korea) Yoon Hyun-pil	
U-15 Team Manager	(South Korea) Kim Young-jin	
U-15 Team Coach	(South Korea) Yoon Si-ho	
U-15 Team Goalkeeping Coach	(South Korea) Yoon Hyun-wook	
U-15 Team Fitness Coach	(South Korea) Jung Hoon-gi	
U-12 Team Manager	(South Korea) Kim Byung-chae	
U-12 Team Coach	(South Korea) Seo Ki-man	
U-12 Team Goalkeeping Coach	(South Korea) Lee Ji-hun	
Scout	(South Korea) Lee Won-jun	
Scout	(South Korea) Jung Jae-yoon	

=== Kim Ho-younr era (30 July 2020–24 September 2020) ===
Position	Name	Notes
Caretaker manager	(South Korea) Kim Ho-young	
Coach	(South Korea) Park Hyuk-soon	
Coach	(South Korea) Lee Jung-youl	
Coach	(South Korea) Kim Jin-kyu	
Goalkeeping Coach	(South Korea) Shin Bum-chul	
Fitness Coach	(Portugal) Manuel Rodrigues	
U-18 Team Manager	(South Korea) Cha Du-ri	
U-18 Team Coach	Vacant	
U-18 Team Goalkeeping Coach	(South Korea) Bang Hyung-gon	
U-18 Team Fitness Coach	(South Korea) Hwang Ji-hwan	
U-18 Team Performance Analyst	(South Korea) Yoon Hyun-pil	
U-15 Team Manager	(South Korea) Kim Young-jin	
U-15 Team Coach	(South Korea) Yoon Si-ho	
U-15 Team Goalkeeping Coach	(South Korea) Yoon Hyun-wook	
U-15 Team Fitness Coach	(South Korea) Jung Hoon-gi	
U-12 Team Manager	(South Korea) Kim Byung-chae	
U-12 Team Coach	(South Korea) Seo Ki-man	
U-12 Team Goalkeeping Coach	(South Korea) Lee Ji-hun	
Scout	(South Korea) Lee Won-jun	
Scout	(South Korea) Jung Jae-yoon	

=== Park Hyuk-soon era (25 September 2020~12 November 2020) ===
Position	Name	Notes
Caretaker manager	(South Korea) Park Hyuk-soon	
First Team Coach	(South Korea) Lee Jung-youl	
First Team Coach	(South Korea) Kim Jin-kyu	
Goalkeeping Coach	(South Korea) Shin Bum-chul	
Fitness Coach	(Portugal) Manuel Rodrigues	
U-18 Team Manager	(South Korea) Cha Du-ri	
U-18 Team Coach	Vacant	
U-18 Team Goalkeeping Coach	(South Korea) Bang Hyung-gon	
U-18 Team Fitness Coach	(South Korea) Hwang Ji-hwan	
U-18 Team Performance Analyst	(South Korea) Yoon Hyun-pil	
U-15 Team Manager	(South Korea) Kim Young-jin	
U-15 Team Coach	(South Korea) Yoon Si-ho	
U-15 Team Goalkeeping Coach	(South Korea) Yoon Hyun-wook	
U-15 Team Fitness Coach	(South Korea) Jung Hoon-gi	
U-12 Team Manager	(South Korea) Kim Byung-chae	
U-12 Team Coach	(South Korea) Seo Ki-man	
U-12 Team Goalkeeping Coach	(South Korea) Lee Ji-hun	
Scout	(South Korea) Jung Jae-yoon	

=== Lee Won-jun era (13 November 2020~3 December 2020) ===
Position	Name	Notes
Caretaker manager	(South Korea) Lee Won-jun	
Coach	(South Korea) Park Hyuk-soon	
Coach	(South Korea) Lee Jung-youl	
Coach	(South Korea) Kim Jin-kyu	
Goalkeeping Coach	(South Korea) Shin Bum-chul	
Fitness Coach	(Portugal) Manuel Rodrigues	
U-18 Team Manager	(South Korea) Cha Du-ri	
U-18 Team Coach	Vacant	
U-18 Team Goalkeeping Coach	(South Korea) Bang Hyung-gon	
U-18 Team Fitness Coach	(South Korea) Hwang Ji-hwan	
U-18 Team Performance Analyst	(South Korea) Yoon Hyun-pil	
U-15 Team Manager	(South Korea) Kim Young-jin	
U-15 Team Coach	(South Korea) Yoon Si-ho	
U-15 Team Goalkeeping Coach	(South Korea) Yoon Hyun-wook	
U-15 Team Fitness Coach	(South Korea) Jung Hoon-gi	
U-12 Team Manager	(South Korea) Kim Byung-chae	
U-12 Team Coach	(South Korea) Seo Ki-man	
U-12 Team Goalkeeping Coach	(South Korea) Lee Ji-hun	
Scout	(South Korea) Jung Jae-yoon	

== Players ==
=== Team squad ===
All players registered for the 2020 season are listed.

No.	Pos.	Nationality	Player	Notes
1	GK	South Korea	Yu Sang-hun	
2	DF	South Korea	Hwang Hyun-soo	
3	DF	South Korea	Lee Woong-hee	Out
5	MF	Spain	Osmar	
6	DF	South Korea	Kim Ju-sung	
7	FW	Brazil	Adriano	
8	MF	South Korea	Jung Won-jin	Conscripted
8	MF	South Korea	Ki Sung-yueng	
9	MF	Uzbekistan	Ikromjon Alibaev	
10	FW	South Korea	Park Chu-young	
11	FW	South Korea	Cho Young-wook	
13	MF	South Korea	Go Yo-han (captain)	
14	MF	South Korea	Kim Han-gil	Out
15	DF	South Korea	Kim Won-sik	
16	MF	South Korea	Ju Se-jong	
17	MF	South Korea	Kim Jin-ya	
18	FW	South Korea	Lee Seung-jae	
19	FW	South Korea	Yun Ju-tae	
20	MF	South Korea	Cha Oh-yeon	
21	GK	South Korea	Yang Han-been	
22	MF	South Korea	Shin Jae-won	Out
22	DF	South Korea	Yun Young-sun	
23	MF	South Korea	Yoon Jong-gyu	
24	MF	South Korea	Jung Hyun-cheol	
25	MF	South Korea	Han Chan-hee	
26	MF	South Korea	Kim Jin-sung	
27	MF	South Korea	Ko Kwang-min	
28	DF	South Korea	Kang Sang-hee	
29	MF	South Korea	Kim Min-su	
30	GK	South Korea	Jeong Jin-wook	
31	GK	South Korea	Baek Jong-bum	
32	DF	South Korea	Park Jun-yeong	
33	FW	South Korea	Lee In-gyu	
34	DF	South Korea	Cho Seok-young	
35	MF	South Korea	Yang Yu-min	
36	MF	South Korea	Kwon Sung-yun	
37	FW	South Korea	Jung Han-min	
38	MF	South Korea	Oh Min-kyu	
39	MF	South Korea	Song Jin-hyung	
40	DF	South Korea	Kim Won-gun	
47	FW	South Korea	Kim Woo-hong	Out
50	FW	South Korea	Park Dong-jin	Conscripted
66	MF	South Korea	Han Seung-gyu	
72	FW	Serbia	Aleksandar Pešić	Out

=== Out on loan and military service ===
No.	Pos.	Nationality	Player	Moving To	Loan Period
—	MF	South Korea	Kim Ju-yeong	(South Korea) Pocheon Citizen	January 2018–June 2020
—	MF	South Korea	Lee Hak-seon	(South Korea) Pocheon Citizen	February 2020–December 2020
—	DF	South Korea	Shin Jae-won	(South Korea) Ansan Greeners	March 2020–December 2020
—	MF	South Korea	Jung Won-jin	(South Korea) Sangju Sangmu	May 2020–November 2021
—	FW	South Korea	Park Dong-jin	(South Korea) Sangju Sangmu	May 2020–November 2021
—	FW	South Korea	Kim Woo-hong	(South Korea) FC Namdong	July 2020–May 2022

Note: Where a player has not declared an international allegiance, nation is determined by place of birth.
※ In: Transferred from other teams in the middle of the season.
※ Out: Transferred to other teams in the middle of the season.
※ Discharged: Transferred from Sanjgu Sangmu for military service in the middle of the season (registered in 2020 season).
※ Conscripted: Transferred to Sanjgu Sangmu for military service after the end of the season.

== See also ==
- FC Seoul
