= 2021 FC Seoul season =

FC Seoul
2021 season
- Chairman: Huh Tae-soo
- Manager: Park Jin-sub (–6 September); An Ik-soo (6 September–)
- Stadium: Seoul World Cup Stadium
- Lowest home attendance: 0
Home colours	Away colours

The 2021 season was FC Seoul's 38th season in the top flight of South Korean football and their 38th season in the K League 1. In addition to the domestic league, the club also participated in the 2021 Korean FA Cup.

The season was marked by significant managerial changes and a struggle for survival in the league. Park Jin-sub, who was appointed as the manager at the beginning of the season, resigned on 6 September 2021 following a string of poor results that left the club at the bottom of the table. He was succeeded by An Ik-soo, who led a remarkable turnaround, eventually securing the club's position in the K League 1.

In the FA Cup, Seoul's campaign was short-lived, as they were eliminated in the third round after a 0–1 defeat to Seoul E-Land FC in the first-ever "Seoul Derby." Key players for the season included newly appointed captain Ki Sung-yueng and new signings Na Sang-ho and Aleksandar Paločević.

== Pre-season ==
- First Winter Training Camp: In Changwon, South Korea - From 7 January 2021 to 27 January 2021
- Second Winter Training Camp: In Jeju, South Korea - From 1 February 2021 to 21 February 2021

=== Pre-season match results ===
Type	Date	Opponents	Result	Score	Scorers	Notes
Practice matches during winter training spell in Changwon, South Korea	25 January 2021	(South Korea) KC University	W	2–0	(South Korea) Ki Sung-yueng, (South Korea) Go Yo-han	
Practice matches during winter training spell in Changwon, South Korea	27 January 2021	(South Korea) Soongsil University	W	7–1	(South Korea) Jung Han-min, (South Korea) Go Yo-han, (South Korea) Lee In-gyu (2) (South Korea) Park Jung-bin, (South Korea) Son Ho-jun, (South Korea) Paik Sang-hoon	3 quarters match
Practice matches during winter training spell in Jeju, South Korea	31 January 2021	(South Korea) Korea University	W	7–0	(South Korea) Na Sang-ho, (South Korea) Go Yo-han (2), (South Korea) Park Jung-bin (South Korea) Kwon Sung-yun, (South Korea) Lee In-gyu (2)	3 quarters match
Practice matches during winter training spell in Jeju, South Korea	7 February 2021	(South Korea) Gyeongju Korea Hydro & Nuclear Power FC	W	2–0	(South Korea) Na Sang-ho, (South Korea) Go Yo-han	3 quarters match
Practice matches during winter training spell in Jeju, South Korea	10 February 2021	(South Korea) Dong-Eui University	W	1–0	(South Korea) Park Chu-young	
Practice matches during winter training spell in Jeju, South Korea	11 February 2021	(South Korea) Dankook University	W	3–0	(South Korea) Lee In-gyu, (South Korea) Han Chan-hee, (Serbia) Aleksandar Paločević	
Practice matches during winter training spell in Jeju, South Korea	13 February 2021	(South Korea) Kyung Hee University	W	6–0	(South Korea) Cho Young-wook, (Serbia) Aleksandar Paločević (2), (South Korea) Kang Sung-jin (South Korea) Park Jung-bin, (South Korea) Lee In-gyu	3 quarters match

== Competitions ==
=== Overview ===
Competition	First match	Last match	Starting round	Final position	Record							
Competition	First match	Last match	Starting round	Final position	Pld	W	D	L	GF	GA	GD	Win %
K League 1	2021-02-27		Matchday 1	Matchday 38					—			
FA Cup	2021-04-14	2021-04-14	Round 3	Round 3	1	0	0	1	0	1	−1	0.00
Total					1	0	0	1	0	1	−1	0.00

Last updated: 24 April 2021
Source: Fixtures and Results at FC Seoul Official Website

=== K League 1 ===
==== Results summary ====
Overall								Home						Away					
Pld	W	D	L	GF	GA	GD	Pts	W	D	L	GF	GA	GD	W	D	L	GF	GA	GD
17	4	5	8	17	22	−5	17	2	1	4	8	10	−2	2	4	4	9	12	−3

Last updated: 19 June 2021.
Source: soccerway

==== Results by round ====
Round	1	2	3	4	5	6	7	8	9	10	11	12	13	14	15	16	17	18
Ground	A	H	A	A	H	A	H	A	H	H	A	A	H	A	H	A	A	H
Result	L	W	L	W	W	W	L	L	L	L	L	D	D	D	L	D	D	
Position	11	5	9	6	4	2	3	3	4	7	9	8	8	8	11	11	9	

Updated to match(es) played on 19 June 2021. Source: wikipedia
A = Away; H = Home; W = Win; D = Draw; L = Loss

==== Matches ====
27 February 2021 Match 1	Jeonbuk Motors	2 - 0	Seoul	Jeonju
05:00	Kim Won-gun 76' (o.g.); Barrow 90+3'	Report	Kim Won-gun (yellow card) 64'; Paločević (yellow card) 90'	Stadium: Jeonju World Cup Stadium; Attendance: 6,199; Referee: (South Korea) Kim Jong-hyeok

7 March 2021 Match 2	Seoul	3 - 0	Suwon	Seoul
07:30	Ki Sung-yueng (yellow card) 21'; Jeong Dong-ho 28' (o.g.); Na Sang-ho 52' 80'	Report	Lee Ki-hyeok (yellow card) 3'; Jeong Dong-ho (yellow card) 85'	Stadium: Seoul World Cup Stadium; Attendance: 4,100; Referee: (South Korea) Park Byung-Jin

10 March 2021 Match 3	Seongnam	1 - 0	Seoul	Seongnam
19:00 KST	Mulić 89' (pen.) (yellow card) 90+4'	Report	Hwang Hyun-soo (yellow card) 43'; Ki Sung-yueng (yellow card) 80'	Stadium: Tancheon Sports Complex; Attendance: 1,334; Referee: (South Korea) Ahn Jae-Hoon

13 March 2021 Match 4	Incheon United	0 - 1	Seoul	Incheon
19:00 KST	Song Si-woo (red card) 77'	Report	Cho Young-wook (yellow card) 39'; Park Jung-bin (yellow card) 58'; Ki Sung-yueng 90'; Paločević (yellow card) 90+4'	Stadium: Sungui Arena Park; Attendance: 1,930; Referee: (South Korea) Kim Jong-hyeok

17 March 2021 Match 5	Seoul	2 - 1	Gwangju	Seoul
19:30 KST	Na Sang-ho 41'; Ki Sung-yueng 84'	Report	Kim Ju-gong 37' (pen.)	Stadium: Seoul World Cup Stadium; Referee: (South Korea) Kim Woo-Sung

=== FA Cup ===
14 April 2021 Third Round	FC Seoul	0 - 1	Seoul E-Land FC	Seoul
19:30 KST		Report	Leandro 84'	Stadium: Seoul World Cup Stadium

== Match reports and match highlights ==
Fixtures and Results at FC Seoul Official Website (in English)

== Season statistics ==
=== K League 1 records ===
Season	Teams	Final Position	Pld	W	D	L	GF	GA	GD	Pts	Manager
2021	12										(South Korea) Park Jin-sub

=== All competitions records ===
K League 1	FA Cup	AFC Champions League	Manager
			(South Korea) Park Jin-sub

=== Attendance records ===
Season Total Att.	K League 1 Season Total Att.	K League 1 Season Average Att.	FA Cup Total / Average Att.	ACL Total / Average Att.	Att. Ranking	Notes

- Season total attendance is K League 1, FA Cup, and AFC Champions League combined

== Coaching staff ==
=== Park Jin-sub era (–6 September 2021) ===
Position	Name	Notes
Manager	(South Korea) Park Jin-sub	
Assistant Manager	(South Korea) Yoo Kyoung-youl	
First Team Coach	(South Korea) Park Hyuk-soon	
First Team Coach	(South Korea) Lee Jung-youl	
Reserve Team Coach	(South Korea) Kim Jin-kyu	
Reserve Team Coach	(South Korea) Cho Sung-yong	
Goalkeeping Coach	(South Korea) Choi Hyun	
Fitness Coach	(South Korea) Hwang Ji-hwan	
U-18 Team Manager	(South Korea) Cha Du-ri	
U-18 Team Coach	(South Korea) Yoon Hyun-pil	
U-18 Team Goalkeeping Coach	(South Korea) Bang Hyung-gon	
U-18 Team Fitness Coach	(South Korea) Jung Hoon-gi	
U-15 Team Manager	(South Korea) Kim Young-jin	
U-15 Team Coach	(South Korea) Kim Byung-chae	
U-15 Team Coach	(South Korea) Yoon Si-ho	
U-15 Team Goalkeeping Coach	(South Korea) Yoon Hyun-wook	
U-15 Team Performance Coach	(South Korea) So Ki-dong	
U-12 Team Manager	(South Korea) Kim Byung-chae	
U-12 Team Coach	(South Korea) Seo Ki-man	
U-12 Team Coach	(South Korea) Lee Ji-hun	
Scout	(South Korea) Lee Won-jun	
Scout	(South Korea) Jung Jae-yoon	

=== An Ik-soo era (6 September 2021–) ===
Position	Name	Notes
Manager	(South Korea) An Ik-soo	
Assistant Manager	(South Korea) Vacant	
First Team Coach	(South Korea) Park Hyuk-soon	
First Team Coach	(South Korea) Lee Jung-youl	
Reserve Team Coach	(South Korea) Kim Jin-kyu	
Reserve Team Coach	(South Korea) Cho Sung-yong	
Goalkeeping Coach	(South Korea) Choi Hyun	
Fitness Coach	(South Korea) Hwang Ji-hwan	
U-18 Team Manager	(South Korea) Cha Du-ri	
U-18 Team Coach	(South Korea) Yoon Hyun-pil	
U-18 Team Goalkeeping Coach	(South Korea) Bang Hyung-gon	
U-18 Team Fitness Coach	(South Korea) Jung Hoon-gi	
U-15 Team Manager	(South Korea) Kim Young-jin	
U-15 Team Coach	(South Korea) Kim Byung-chae	
U-15 Team Coach	(South Korea) Yoon Si-ho	
U-15 Team Goalkeeping Coach	(South Korea) Yoon Hyun-wook	
U-15 Team Performance Coach	(South Korea) So Ki-dong	
U-12 Team Manager	(South Korea) Kim Byung-chae	
U-12 Team Coach	(South Korea) Seo Ki-man	
U-12 Team Coach	(South Korea) Lee Ji-hun	
Scout	(South Korea) Lee Won-jun	
Scout	(South Korea) Jung Jae-yoon	
Scout	(South Korea) Yoo Kyoung-youl	

== Players ==
=== Team squad ===
- All players registered for the 2021 season are listed.

No.	Pos.	Nationality	Player	Notes
1	GK	South Korea	Yu Sang-hun	
2	DF	South Korea	Hwang Hyun-soo	
3	DF	South Korea	Cho Seok-young	
5	MF	Spain	Osmar	
6	MF	South Korea	Kim Jin-sung	
7	FW	South Korea	Na Sang-ho	
8	MF	South Korea	Ki Sung-yueng (captain)	
9	MF	Uzbekistan	Ikromjon Alibaev	Out
9	FW	South Korea	Ji Dong-won	
10	FW	South Korea	Park Chu-young	
11	FW	South Korea	Cho Young-wook	
13	MF	South Korea	Go Yo-han	
14	FW	South Korea	Kwon Sung-yun	
15	DF	South Korea	Hong Joon-ho	Out
15	MF	South Korea	Yeo Reum	
16	MF	South Korea	Han Chan-hee	Conscripted
16	MF	Australia	Connor Chapman	
17	MF	South Korea	Kim Jin-ya	
18	FW	South Korea	Ahn Gi-hun	
19	FW	South Korea	Jung Han-min	
20	FW	South Korea	Lee In-gyu	
21	GK	South Korea	Yang Han-been	
22	FW	South Korea	Park Jung-bin	
23	DF	South Korea	Yoon Jong-gyu	
24	MF	South Korea	Jung Hyun-cheol	Conscripted
24	MF	South Korea	Jung Won-jin	Discharged
26	MF	Serbia	Aleksandar Paločević	
27	MF	South Korea	Ko Kwang-min	
28	MF	South Korea	Kang Sang-hee	
29	GK	South Korea	Baek Jong-bum	
30	GK	South Korea	Jeong Jin-wook	Out
33	MF	South Korea	Yang Yu-min	
35	MF	South Korea	Paik Sang-hoon	
36	DF	South Korea	Kim Ju-sung	Conscripted
38	FW	South Korea	Son Ho-jun	
40	DF	South Korea	Kim Won-gun	
45	DF	South Korea	Lee Han-beom	
50	FW	South Korea	Park Dong-jin	Discharged
55	DF	South Korea	Sim Won-seong	
66	DF	South Korea	Cha Oh-yeon	
72	FW	South Korea	Kang Seong-jin	
77	DF	South Korea	Shin Jae-won	
88	DF	South Korea	Lee Tae-seok	
99	FW	Brazil	Gabriel Barbosa	

=== Out on loan and military service ===
No.	Pos.	Nationality	Player	Moving To	Loan Period
—	MF	South Korea	Lee Hak-seon	(South Korea) Pocheon Citizen	February 2020–December 2021
—	MF	South Korea	Jung Won-jin	(South Korea) Gimcheon Sangmu	May 2020–November 2021
—	FW	South Korea	Park Dong-jin	(South Korea) Gimcheon Sangmu	May 2020–November 2021
—	FW	South Korea	Kim Woo-hong	(South Korea) FC Namdong	July 2020–September 2022
—	FW	South Korea	Lee Seung-jae	(South Korea) Chungnam Asan FC	February 2021–December 2021
—	FW	South Korea	Oh Min-gyu	(South Korea) Yangpyeong FC	February 2021–December 2021
—	DF	South Korea	Kim Ju-sung	(South Korea) Gimcheon Sangmu	March 2021–May 2022
—	MF	South Korea	Jung Hyun-cheol	(South Korea) Gimcheon Sangmu	March 2021–September 2022
—	MF	South Korea	Han Chan-hee	(South Korea) Gimcheon Sangmu	June 2021–December 2022
—	GK	South Korea	Jeong Jin-wook	(South Korea) Gimhae FC	July 2021–December 2021

Note: Where a player has not declared an international allegiance, nation is determined by place of birth.
※ In: Transferred from other teams in the middle of the season.
※ Out: Transferred to other teams in the middle of the season.
※ Discharged: Transferred from Gimcheon Sangmuu for military service in the middle of the season (registered in 2021 season).
※ Conscripted: Transferred to Gimcheon Sangmu for military service after the end of the season.

== See also ==
- FC Seoul
