= Park Chu-young =

South Korean former footballer (born 1985)

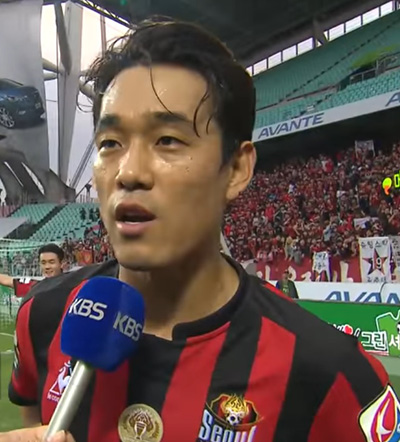
- Park with FC Seoul in 2016

Personal information
- Date of birth: 10 July 1985 (age 41)
- Place of birth: Daegu, South Korea
- Height: 1.82 m (6 ft 0 in)
- Position: Forward

Youth career
- 2001–2003: Cheonggu High School
- 2001–2002: Zico Football Center

College career
Years	Team	Apps	(Gls)
2004	Korea University		

Senior career*
Years	Team	Apps	(Gls)
2005–2008	FC Seoul	68	(23)
2008–2011	Monaco	91	(25)
2011–2014	Arsenal	1	(0)
2012–2013	→ Celta Vigo (loan)	22	(3)
2014	→ Watford (loan)	2	(0)
2014–2015	Al-Shabab	7	(1)
2015–2021	FC Seoul	186	(42)
2022–2024	Ulsan HD	8	(1)
Total		385	(95)

International career
2003–2005	South Korea U20	23	(17)
2006–2012	South Korea U23	30	(12)
2005–2014	South Korea	68	(24)

Managerial career
- 2025: Ulsan HD (assistant)
Medal record
Men's football
Representing South Korea
Olympic Games
Bronze medal – third place	2012 London
Asian Games
Bronze medal – third place	2010 Guangzhou
AFC Youth Championship
Winner	2004 Malaysia
EAFF Championship
Winner	2008 China
- * Club domestic league appearances and goals

- Park Chu-young
- Hangul: 박주영
- Hanja: 朴主永
- RR: Bak Juyeong
- MR: Pak Chuyŏng

Park Chu-young (Korean: 박주영; Hanja: 朴主永; Korean pronunciation: [pak̚.t͈ɕu.jʌŋ]; also romanised as Park Ju-young; born 10 July 1985) is a South Korean former professional footballer, coach and football executive. He played primarily as a forward. Regarded as one of South Korea's leading prospects, he was the top scorer and most valuable player at the 2004 AFC Youth Championship and was named the AFC Youth Player of the Year. He began his professional career with FC Seoul, winning the K League Rookie of the Year award and selection to the K League Best XI in his first season.

Park moved to Monaco in 2008 and scored 25 goals in 91 Ligue 1 appearances. He joined Arsenal in 2011, but made only seven competitive appearances for the club and was loaned to Celta Vigo and Watford. After a short spell with Al-Shabab, he returned to Seoul in 2015, winning the Korean FA Cup that year and the K League title in 2016. He ended his professional playing career with Ulsan HD, winning three consecutive league titles—first as a player and then as a player-coach—and retired at the end of 2024. After one season as a full-time Ulsan assistant, he left the club at the end of 2025 and became a co-owner and joint representative of Yangcheon TNT FC.

At international level, Park scored 24 goals in 68 appearances for the South Korea senior team between 2005 and 2014. He represented the country at the 2006, 2010 and 2014 FIFA World Cups; in 2010, he scored against Nigeria as South Korea reached the round of 16. As an over-age player, he also helped the South Korean under-23 team win a bronze medal at the 2012 Summer Olympics.

== Early life ==
Park was born and raised in Daegu. In April 1995, while in the fourth grade at Banyawol Elementary School, he was noticed by the school's football coach during an inter-class match. Park initially trained without his parents' knowledge; after they objected, the coach spent about three months persuading them to let him join the school team. He later attended Cheonggu Middle School and Cheonggu High School.

In March 2001, during his first year at Cheonggu High, Park began a one-year training spell in Brazil at the Zico Football Center, funded by Pohang Steelers as part of the club's programme for promising young players. Contemporary coverage credited the spell with teaching him to play the ball economically, without unnecessary exertion. At Cheonggu, coach Byun Byung-joo moved Park from a wide attacking role in his first year to midfield in his second and centre-forward in his third. By the end of his high-school career, Park had scored 47 goals in 33 matches and won the scoring title at four national tournaments. He was also the only high-school player chosen for South Korea's squad at the 2003 FIFA World Youth Championship. Although he did not play, he was the youngest member of South Korea's squad.

Park entered Korea University in 2004. In his first year he scored 10 goals as Korea University won a national university tournament, finishing as the competition's top scorer. Later that year, he scored six goals—including both goals in the final against China—as South Korea won the 2004 AFC Youth Championship; he received both the tournament's top-scorer and most valuable player awards and was subsequently named the AFC Youth Player of the Year. His reputation grew further at an eight-nation under-20 tournament in Qatar in January 2005, where he recorded nine goals and one assist in four appearances as South Korea won the title, and again received the top-scorer and most valuable player awards. Korean media labelled him a "football genius", while the surge of public interest became known as the "Park Chu-young syndrome"; amid the attention, the Korea Football Association announced that it would form what contemporary reporting described as its first management committee devoted to a single player.

Park continued his studies after turning professional. In 2008, while a fourth-year student in Korea University's Department of Physical Education, he completed a teaching placement at Dongbuk High School and was admitted to a master's programme at the university's Graduate School of Education. He later graduated from both the department and the graduate school.

== Club career ==
=== FC Seoul ===
On 28 February 2005, after one season at Korea University, Park signed a three-year contract with FC Seoul. Under regulations introduced for the 2005 season, he received no signing bonus and was paid the maximum rookie salary of ₩50 million in his first year. His contract allowed him to pursue a move to Europe during the season and provided for him to receive a share of any transfer fee; Park said he chose Seoul because he regarded the club as the quickest route towards his ambition of playing in Europe.

The move led to a dispute with Pohang Steelers, which had financed Park's year at the Zico Football Center in Brazil. Pohang said that its agreement with Park required him to negotiate with the club first if he entered the K League and to reimburse the training costs if he joined another team. After he signed for Seoul without such negotiations, Pohang announced that it would seek approximately ₩50 million from him. Seoul said it had been unaware of the agreement, maintained that it did not oblige Park to join Pohang, and treated reimbursement as a matter between Park and Pohang.

Park made his professional debut as a half-time substitute in a 1–0 League Cup defeat by Daegu FC on 9 March, watched by approximately 25,000 spectators. Four days later, he scored his first professional goal in a 2–1 defeat by Seongnam Ilhwa Chunma. On 18 May, he scored his first professional hat-trick—from a direct free kick, a header and a penalty—in a 5–3 loss to Gwangju Sangmu. Aged 19 years and 10 months, he became the youngest player to score a K League hat-trick at the time. On his twentieth birthday, 10 July, he scored another hat-trick in a 4–1 victory over Pohang before 48,375 spectators, then a K League single-match attendance record.

Across the league and League Cup, Park finished his debut season with 18 goals and four assists in 30 appearances. His popularity generated what the press called the "Park Chu-young syndrome": Seoul's average attendance increased from 12,418 in 2004 to a league-leading 25,478 in 2005, while other clubs promoted Seoul's visits around his appearances. Seoul nevertheless missed the playoffs. Park received all 73 votes in the press ballot for Rookie of the Year, becoming the first unanimous winner in league history, and was selected for the K League Best XI.

Park's scoring output declined in 2006, when he recorded ten goals in 32 appearances in all competitions compared with 18 the previous season; Korean coverage described his form as a "second-year slump". After returning from the 2006 FIFA World Cup, he scored the winner against Incheon United on 22 July, taking Seoul to within one point of the League Cup title. Seoul secured the trophy four days later, giving Park his first senior honour.

Under new manager Şenol Güneş, Park began 2007 by scoring a hat-trick in a 4–1 League Cup victory over Suwon Samsung Bluewings on 21 March. A recurring left-foot injury then sidelined Park for much of the season; after returning late in the campaign, he finished with five goals in 15 appearances. He recorded two goals and four assists in 17 league and League Cup appearances in 2008 before Monaco submitted a formal offer at the end of August; Seoul said that it would respect Park's decision and help facilitate the move.

=== Monaco ===
On 1 September 2008, Park joined Monaco on a four-year contract for a reported €2 million transfer fee and was given the number 10 shirt. He made his Ligue 1 debut against Lorient on 13 September, scoring the opening goal and assisting Frédéric Nimani in a 2–0 victory. Park immediately became a regular and finished his first season in France with five goals in 31 league appearances.

Park's scoring output increased under new manager Guy Lacombe in 2009–10. Monaco generally deployed him as the lone centre-forward in a 4–2–3–1 formation, with players including Nenê operating behind him; contemporary analysis credited the system with making better use of Park's movement and combination play. In October 2009, Monaco extended his contract by one year, through June 2013.

On 24 January 2010, Park headed the winning goal in a 2–1 victory over Lyon in the round of 32 of the 2009–10 Coupe de France. Six days later, he scored twice in a 3–2 league victory over local rivals Nice, his first multi-goal match in France. The goals raised his season totals to eight in the league and nine in all competitions. A right-thigh injury sustained during a Coupe de France victory over Bordeaux in February subsequently sidelined him for nearly a month. Park returned and played the full 120 minutes as Monaco lost the Coupe de France final 1–0 after extra time to Paris Saint-Germain on 1 May. He aggravated the thigh injury during the final and missed the remainder of the season, which he ended with eight league goals and one goal in the Coupe de France.

Park's final season at Monaco was his most productive in France. On 22 December 2010, he scored a stoppage-time winner in a 2–1 victory over Sochaux. During his customary kneeling prayer celebration, his teammates piled onto him and he damaged cartilage in his right knee. The injury sidelined him for approximately a month and forced him to withdraw from the 2011 AFC Asian Cup.

After returning, Park reached ten league goals with a volley against Arles-Avignon on 2 April 2011. The following week, he scored the only goal in a surprise victory over league leaders Lille, temporarily lifting Monaco out of the relegation zone. He finished the season with 12 goals in 33 league appearances, becoming the first South Korean to score 12 goals in a Ligue 1 season. Monaco nevertheless finished 18th and were relegated following a 2–0 final-day defeat by Lyon, ending their 34-season stay in the top flight. Park subsequently stated that he wanted to join a stronger club capable of competing in European competition. Across his three seasons at Monaco, he scored 25 goals in 91 Ligue 1 appearances.

=== Arsenal ===
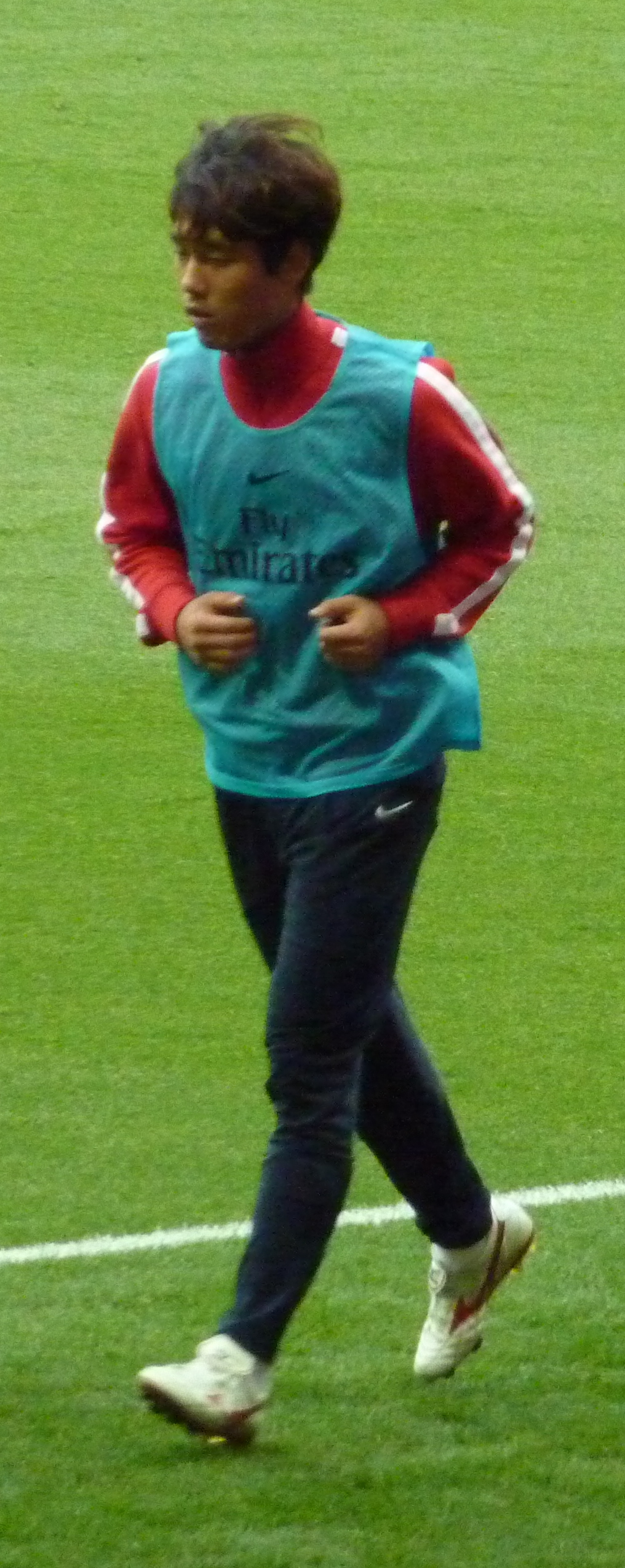
Park Chu-young at Arsenal

On 30 August 2011, Park joined English Premier League club Arsenal for a reported fee of between £3 million and £5 million and was assigned the number 9 shirt. Park had already agreed terms and begun a medical with French champions Lille, but did not return for its second part after Arsenal made a late approach. Lille president Michel Seydoux said that the club had received no notice of Park's change of plans.

Park made his Arsenal debut by starting a 3–1 League Cup victory over Shrewsbury Town on 20 September. In his second appearance, on 25 October, he curled Andrey Arshavin's pass into the far corner to score the winning goal in a 2–1 League Cup victory over Bolton Wanderers. Manager Arsène Wenger praised Park's movement and finishing and said that he was ready to play in the league.

On 1 November, Park made his UEFA Champions League debut by starting a goalless draw with Marseille, before being replaced by Robin van Persie after 62 minutes. He nevertheless remained a peripheral member of the squad. Wenger acknowledged in December that he had not given Park sufficient opportunities, while also saying that some players required time to adjust to the intensity and physical demands of English football. Park's only Premier League appearance came as a late substitute in a 2–1 home defeat by Manchester United on 22 January 2012. He finished his first season with one goal in six appearances across all competitions.

==== Loan to Celta Vigo ====
On 31 August 2012, following the arrivals of forwards Lukas Podolski and Olivier Giroud, Park joined newly promoted Spanish club Celta Vigo on a season-long loan. He made his La Liga debut as a substitute in a 2–1 defeat by Valencia on 15 September. On his home debut a week later, Park entered against Getafe in the 66th minute and scored the winning goal with his first touch two minutes later, volleying in a cross from Michael Krohn-Dehli. The goal, which gave Celta a 2–1 victory, made him the first South Korean to score in La Liga.

Park subsequently scored league goals against Mallorca and Deportivo de La Coruña and a Copa del Rey goal against Almería. His header against Almería opened the scoring in a 3–0 extra-time victory which overturned a two-goal first-leg deficit. He did not establish himself as a regular under either Paco Herrera or Abel Resino, starting 12 of his 26 appearances in all competitions and scoring four goals. In May 2013, Celta announced that an MRI had revealed a small fracture in the tarsal navicular bone of his right foot, with an expected recovery period of two to three weeks.

==== Loan to Watford ====
After returning to Arsenal, Park's only appearance of the 2013–14 season came as a substitute in a 2–0 League Cup defeat by Chelsea on 29 October 2013. It proved to be his final appearance for Arsenal.

On 31 January 2014, Park joined Championship club Watford on loan for the remainder of the season. He made his debut as a stoppage-time substitute in a 2–0 victory over Brighton & Hove Albion on 2 February. His only start came in a 2–0 defeat by Bolton Wanderers on 22 February. A condition affecting his right foot subsequently curtailed the loan spell. Park returned to South Korea in early April and, with the approval of Watford's and Arsenal's medical staffs, remained there to rehabilitate, having made two appearances for Watford without scoring.

Arsenal announced in June 2014 that Park would leave when his contract expired on 30 June. He finished his Arsenal career with seven first-team appearances across all competitions, including one in the Premier League, and one goal.

=== Al-Shabab ===
After spending three months without a club following his departure from Arsenal, Park joined Saudi Pro League side Al-Shabab on 1 October 2014. He made his league debut away to Al-Hilal on 17 October, coming on in the 57th minute and converting a pass from Naif Hazazi in stoppage time to score the only goal of a 1–0 victory. It was his first club goal in 19 months.

Park did not score again, and on 6 February 2015 Al-Shabab announced that it had terminated his contract. He left after scoring once in seven league appearances. The departure was followed by a dispute over unpaid wages. After Park sought FIFA mediation, FIFA ordered Al-Shabab to pay him; when the club failed to comply, FIFA fined it 30,000 Swiss francs in 2017 and warned that six points would be deducted unless it paid approximately US$1.5 million in outstanding wages and interest within 90 days.

=== Return to FC Seoul ===
On 10 March 2015, Park returned to FC Seoul on a three-year contract, nearly seven years after leaving the club for Monaco. Seoul did not disclose his salary, but said that financial terms had not been Park's priority and that he wanted to conclude his playing career in the K League. Knee and foot injuries affected his first season back, in which he scored seven goals and provided two assists in 23 league appearances. In the quarter-finals of the 2015 Korean FA Cup, he scored both goals as Seoul came from behind to defeat Pohang Steelers 2–1. Seoul subsequently won the tournament by defeating Incheon United in the final.

During the 2016 season, Park was used in rotation with Dejan Damjanović and Adriano, starting 21 of his 34 league appearances. After Hwang Sun-hong became manager in June, Park was also deployed on the right wing, an unfamiliar position that he said he accepted for the benefit of the team. He finished the league season with ten goals, reaching double figures in the K League for the first time since his debut season in 2005. In the first leg of the 2016 AFC Champions League quarter-final against Shandong Luneng Taishan on 24 August, Park assisted Dejan's opening goal and scored Seoul's second in a 3–1 victory. Seoul entered the final match of the 2016 K League Classic level on points with Jeonbuk Hyundai Motors, but needed a victory because Jeonbuk held the goals-scored tiebreaker. Park came on as a substitute in the first half and scored the only goal in the 58th minute, giving Seoul the championship and Park the first league title of his professional career.

Park was appointed vice-captain before the 2017 season. He scored eight goals in 34 league appearances, and signed a new three-year contract in January 2018 after becoming a free agent. His role diminished during a difficult 2018 season, and he went three months without a league appearance before returning under reappointed manager Choi Yong-soo in October. He scored against Gangwon FC on his return, although the 1–1 draw extended Seoul's winless run to eleven matches. After Seoul finished eleventh, Park appeared in both legs of their promotion–relegation playoff against Busan IPark. He scored a long-range equaliser in stoppage time of the second leg as Seoul drew 1–1 and retained their place in the K League 1 with a 4–2 aggregate victory.

Under Choi, Park enjoyed a resurgence in 2019. He recorded ten goals and a career-high seven assists in 35 league appearances, his most productive league season since returning to South Korea. Seoul recovered from the previous season's relegation playoff to finish third and qualify for the 2020 AFC Champions League. In their first Champions League group-stage match in three years, Park scored the winning goal in a 1–0 victory over Melbourne Victory. On 4 July 2020, he scored and provided an assist as Seoul recovered from two goals behind to draw 3–3 with Suwon Samsung Bluewings. The goal was his ninth in the Super Match, taking him past Dejan as the fixture's record scorer.

Park made 17 league appearances without scoring during the 2021 season. When his contract expired at the end of the year, Seoul offered him a position coaching the club's youth players, but he declined because he wished to continue his playing career. He left Seoul having scored 90 goals in 314 competitive appearances across his two spells with the club.

=== Ulsan HD ===
On 16 January 2022, Park joined Ulsan Hyundai, reuniting with manager Hong Myung-bo, who had coached him at the 2012 Summer Olympics and the 2014 FIFA World Cup. Park had declined a coaching offer from FC Seoul because he wanted to continue playing. Ulsan had finished as league runners-up in each of the previous three seasons; Park said that he hoped to help Hong win the title and that part of his role would be to help unite the squad.

Park was used mainly as a reserve during his first season, making six league appearances, five of them as a substitute. His only goal of the campaign came against Guangzhou in a 3–0 group-stage victory in the 2022 AFC Champions League on 21 April. Ulsan subsequently won their first league title in 17 years. Despite Park's limited playing time, Hong and other members of the club credited him with contributing to the championship through his work as a veteran member of the squad.

Park became a player-coach in 2023, with his duties increasingly focused on coaching. Ulsan retained the league title that season and won a third consecutive championship in 2024, when Park again spent most of the campaign in his coaching role. After deciding to retire at the end of 2024, he made his first competitive appearance in more than two years against former club FC Seoul on 10 November. Park's Ulsan teammates had asked manager Kim Pan-gon to select him so that he could bid farewell to the Seoul supporters; he entered in the 32nd minute and was replaced at half-time.

In the season's final league match, against Suwon FC on 23 November, Park came on in the 73rd minute with the score tied at 2–2. He assisted Ataru Esaka's winning goal before converting a cross from Lee Chung-yong to complete a 4–2 victory. The assist was the 100th goal contribution of his K League career, and his subsequent goal raised the total to 101.

== International career ==
=== Early career ===
Park was the youngest member and only high-school player in South Korea's squad for the 2003 FIFA World Youth Championship. He did not appear as the team reached the round of 16. The following year, he scored six goals at the 2004 AFC Youth Championship, including both goals in the 2–0 final victory over China, as South Korea retained the title and won the competition for an eleventh time. Park finished as the tournament's top scorer and most valuable player.

At the 2005 FIFA World Youth Championship, Park missed a penalty and dislocated his left elbow against Nigeria but continued playing after treatment. He equalised with an 89th-minute free kick before his stoppage-time shot was parried to captain Baek Ji-hoon, who scored the winner in a 2–1 comeback victory. A 2–0 defeat by Brazil in the final group match left South Korea third in their group and eliminated on goal difference from the ranking of third-placed teams.

National-team manager Jo Bonfrère initially resisted calls to promote Park, questioning whether his slight build was ready for senior football and reportedly saying that he appeared light enough to be blown away by the wind. Park's form after joining FC Seoul changed Bonfrère's view, and he selected him for two decisive World Cup qualifiers in June 2005. On 3 June, Park started on the left wing against Uzbekistan and scored a stoppage-time equaliser in a 1–1 draw on his senior debut. Five days later, he opened the scoring and won a penalty in a 4–0 victory over Kuwait that secured South Korea's sixth consecutive World Cup appearance.

Park was selected for the 2006 FIFA World Cup, but appeared only in the final group match against Switzerland. He started and was replaced in the 66th minute as South Korea lost 2–0 and were eliminated.

Park scored twice in South Korea's opening match of the 2006 Asian Games, a 3–0 win over Bangladesh, but did not score again as the team finished fourth. At the 2008 Summer Olympics, his direct free kick put South Korea ahead against Cameroon in their opening match, which ended 1–1. South Korea later beat Honduras but were eliminated in the group stage.

=== 2010 World Cup ===
Poor club form and an injury to the instep of his left foot led to Park's omission from the 2007 AFC Asian Cup, and he did not play a senior international that year. Recalled by Huh Jung-moo in 2008, Park scored twice in a 3–2 victory over China as South Korea won the 2008 East Asian Football Championship; he shared the tournament's top-scorer award.

Park established himself as Huh's first-choice centre-forward during South Korea's unbeaten qualification campaign for the 2010 World Cup, appearing in all twelve matches and scoring a team-high four goals. His stoppage-time goal completed a 2–0 away victory over Saudi Arabia in November 2008, ending South Korea's nineteen-year winless run against them, and his opening goal in a 2–0 win away to the United Arab Emirates the following June helped secure qualification with two matches remaining.

By March 2009, Korean media were grouping Park with captain Park Ji-sung, winger Lee Chung-yong and midfielder Ki Sung-yueng under the label 양박쌍용 (roughly, "the two Parks and two Yongs"), a wordplay on the two players surnamed Park and the shared final syllable of Lee's and Ki's Korean given names. The quartet formed the attacking core of Huh's side, with Park Chu-young leading the forward line, Park Ji-sung and Lee playing on the flanks and Ki operating in central midfield. On the eve of the 2010 World Cup, Yonhap News Agency described the four as accounting for more than half of the team's strength.

Park started all four of South Korea's matches at the 2010 FIFA World Cup. In the second group match, Lionel Messi's free kick deflected off his leg for an own goal as Argentina won 4–1. In the decisive final group match against Nigeria, he curled a direct free kick inside the far post to give South Korea a 2–1 lead. The match finished 2–2, sending the country to the World Cup knockout stage for the first time outside South Korea. His fifth-minute free kick struck the post in the round of 16 against Uruguay, who won 2–1.

=== 2010 Asian Games ===
Manager Hong Myung-bo selected Park and midfielder Kim Jung-woo as the only two over-age players in a squad built largely around footballers eligible for the 2012 Olympics. Because the 2010 Asian Games fell outside the FIFA international calendar, Monaco was not obliged to release Park and initially resisted doing so, but he personally persuaded the club to allow him to join after the tournament had begun. After appearing as a substitute against Jordan, he scored in three consecutive victories over Palestine, China and Uzbekistan; his extra-time goal against Uzbekistan proved the quarter-final winner. After South Korea lost 1–0 to the United Arab Emirates with the final kick of extra time in the semi-finals, Park scored to begin a late comeback from 3–1 down against Iran; two subsequent goals by Ji Dong-won completed a 4–3 victory and secured the bronze medal. Park finished with four goals in six appearances. Because only an Asian Games gold medal qualified an athlete for the sports-personnel alternative-service programme, the bronze left his military-service status unresolved.

=== 2012 Summer Olympics ===
Park's selection as an over-age player for the 2012 Summer Olympics was preceded by a national controversy over his military service. A ten-year residence permit from Monaco had made him eligible to defer conscription until the end of 2022, but its disclosure in March 2012 prompted allegations that he intended to avoid active service. After being omitted from the senior team's June World Cup qualifiers, Park apologised for delaying a public explanation, denied intending to evade his obligation and promised to serve. Hong appeared alongside him at the press conference and subsequently selected him despite both the controversy and his lack of playing time at Arsenal. Contemporary coverage also cited Park's previous role as a principal scorer under Hong and the rapport he had built with the younger players at the 2010 Asian Games as reasons for his selection.

Park appeared in all six Olympic matches and scored twice. He headed the opening goal in a 2–1 group-stage win over Switzerland. In the bronze-medal match against Japan, he collected a long clearance near the halfway line, beat several defenders and scored the opener in a 2–0 victory, giving South Korea its first Olympic football medal. Rather than constituting a complete exemption from military obligations, the medal qualified Park for South Korea's sports-personnel alternative-service programme in place of ordinary active-duty conscription. He entered a four-week basic military-training course in 2013 and was required to spend 34 months working in football as a player or coach. Across the 2010 Asian Games and 2012 Olympics, Park made twelve appearances and scored six goals as an over-age player.

=== 2014 World Cup ===
A right-knee cartilage injury suffered while celebrating a stoppage-time winner for Monaco ruled Park out of the 2011 AFC Asian Cup, his second successive absence from the tournament. After Park Ji-sung retired from international football, coach Cho Kwang-rae appointed Park Chu-young as the new captain in February 2011. Cho cited Park's leadership and ability to serve as a player-coach on the field. Park scored eight recognised goals in nine internationals that year, including a hat-trick against Lebanon and six goals in South Korea's first four third-round qualifiers for the 2014 World Cup. Park also scored both Korean goals in a 2–2 friendly against Poland, but the Korea Football Association excluded the match and goals from its official A-international records because South Korea used seven substitutes, one more than the permitted limit.

New manager Choi Kang-hee appointed defender Kwak Tae-hwi captain in Park's place in February 2012, ending Park's year-long tenure with the armband. The military-service controversy described above also affected Park's senior-team career: Choi omitted him from the opening two matches of the final round of World Cup qualification, citing both his form and his handling of the issue. After South Korea won the Olympic bronze medal, Park was recalled for qualifiers against Uzbekistan and Iran, appearing in both without scoring. His only senior appearance in 2013 came as a half-time substitute in a 4–0 friendly defeat by Croatia in February.

Park's continuing lack of club football further reduced his role in the senior team. Hong recalled him after thirteen months for a March 2014 friendly against Greece, acknowledging that the decision departed from his normal selection criterion. Park scored the opening goal in a 2–0 win. Hong then selected him for the 2014 FIFA World Cup despite his continued shortage of club appearances, citing Park's experience and the absence of a satisfactory replacement.

Park started against Russia and Algeria but managed only one shot, none on target, in approximately 114 minutes. Hong left him on the bench for the final group match against Belgium, and South Korea finished last in their group. Park returned for friendlies against Jordan and Iran that November. The 1–0 defeat by Iran on 18 November became his 68th and final senior international; he finished with 24 goals.

== Style of play ==
Park was a mobile and technically skilled forward who played primarily as a centre-forward, but could also operate behind another striker, as an attacking midfielder or as a wide forward. A 2005 tactical analysis attributed his versatility to his dribbling, shooting and passing, while regarding centre-forward as the role that best exploited his movement and goalscoring ability; his movement could also draw defenders away and create space for teammates. Arsène Wenger later praised Park's technical quality, mobility and aerial ability, describing him as adaptable enough either to lead the attack or play behind another striker. Former South Korea assistant coach Afshin Ghotbi identified Park's instinctive positioning and final touch as trademarks.

Despite standing 1.82 m (6 ft 0 in), Park was effective in the air. In a 2005 fitness test commissioned by FC Seoul from the LG Sports Science Information Centre, his standing vertical jump was measured at 91 cm (36 in), the highest in the squad and almost 30 cm (12 in) above its 62.6 cm (24.6 in) average.

He was also a specialist right-footed free-kick taker. Sports Illustrated reported before the 2010 FIFA World Cup that Park took most of South Korea's free kicks. During his second spell with FC Seoul, he served as the team's designated free-kick and corner taker; rather than relying primarily on power, he varied curling direct attempts with indirect deliveries and rehearsed routines.

== After retirement ==
After ending his professional playing career, Park remained at Ulsan as a full-time assistant coach in January 2025. While still at Ulsan, he was appointed a non-executive director of K5 League club Yangcheon TNT FC in April. In December, Park announced that he would leave Ulsan at the end of the season.

Later that month, Park expanded his involvement with Yangcheon TNT by becoming a co-owner and investor. By February 2026, he was serving as one of the club's joint representatives. In June, Park made his debut as a television football commentator for KBS during the 2026 FIFA World Cup.

== Personal life ==
Park is a devout Christian. He has described football as a means of sharing his faith and was known for writing "Jesus Christ" alongside his autograph. His signature goal celebration was to kneel, interlock his fingers and pray. After scoring a stoppage-time winner for Monaco in December 2010, he damaged cartilage in his right knee when teammates piled onto him during the celebration.

Park was reserved in public and frequently declined post-match interviews. In 2014, he denied disliking journalists personally and explained that he believed players should communicate through their training and performances. A Yonhap profile contrasted his public manner with teammates' descriptions of him as friendly, warm-hearted and dryly humorous.

In April 2014, Park donated ₩100 million through the Korean Red Cross to support families affected by the Sewol ferry disaster. In April 2023, he donated another ₩100 million to Korea University's development fund.

Park married his longtime partner, whom he met while studying at Korea University, in a private ceremony on 12 June 2011.

== Career statistics ==
=== Club ===
Appearances and goals by club, season and competition
Club	Season	League			National cup (Note: Includes Korean FA Cup, Coupe de France, FA Cup, Copa del Rey)		League cup (Note: Includes Korean League Cup, Coupe de la Ligue, EFL Cup)		Continental		Other		Total	
Club	Season	Division	Apps	Goals	Apps	Goals	Apps	Goals	Apps	Goals	Apps	Goals	Apps	Goals
FC Seoul	2005	K League	19	12	2	0	11	6	—		—		32	18
FC Seoul	2006	K League	25	7	2	2	4	1	—		1 (Note: Appearance in K League Championship)	0	32	10
FC Seoul	2007	K League	11	2	1	0	3	3	—		—		15	5
FC Seoul	2008	K League	13	2	0	0	4	0	—		—		17	2
FC Seoul	Total		68	23	5	2	22	10	—		1	0	96	35
Monaco	2008–09	Ligue 1	31	5	3	0	1	0	—		—		35	5
Monaco	2009–10	Ligue 1	27	8	5	1	1	0	—		—		33	9
Monaco	2010–11	Ligue 1	33	12	0	0	2	0	—		—		35	12
Monaco	Total		91	25	8	1	4	0	—		—		103	26
Arsenal	2011–12	Premier League	1	0	0	0	3	1	2 (Note: Appearances in UEFA Champions League)	0	—		6	1
Arsenal	2013–14	Premier League	0	0	0	0	1	0	0	0	—		1	0
Arsenal	Total		1	0	0	0	4	1	2	0	—		7	1
Celta Vigo (loan)	2012–13	La Liga	22	3	4	1	—		—		—		26	4
Watford (loan)	2013–14	Championship	2	0	0	0	—		—		—		2	0
Al-Shabab	2014–15	Saudi Pro League	7	1	0	0	—		—		—		7	1
FC Seoul	2015	K League Classic	23	7	1	2	—		0	0	—		24	9
FC Seoul	2016	K League Classic	34	10	5	0	—		10 (Note: Appearances in AFC Champions League)	1	—		49	11
FC Seoul	2017	K League Classic	34	8	1	0	—		4	2	—		39	10
FC Seoul	2018	K League 1	20	3	0	0	—		—		2 (Note: Appearances in K League promotion-relegation playoffs)	1	22	4
FC Seoul	2019	K League 1	35	10	1	2	—		—		—		36	12
FC Seoul	2020	K League 1	23	4	2	1	—		6	4	—		31	9
FC Seoul	2021	K League 1	17	0	0	0	—		—		—		17	0
FC Seoul	Total		186	42	10	5	—		20	7	2	1	218	55
Ulsan HD	2022	K League 1	6	0	1	0	—		4	1	—		11	1
Ulsan HD	2023	K League 1	0	0	0	0	—		0	0	—		0	0
Ulsan HD	2024	K League 1	2	1	0	0	—		0	0	—		2	1
Ulsan HD	Total		8	1	1	0	—		4	1	—		13	2
Career total			385	95	28	9	30	11	26	8	3	1	472	124

=== International ===
Appearances and goals by national team and year
National team	Year	Apps	Goals
South Korea	2005	6	2
South Korea	2006	14	3
South Korea	2008	9	5
South Korea	2009	9	3
South Korea	2010	10	2
South Korea	2011	9	8
South Korea	2012	3	0
South Korea	2013	1	0
South Korea	2014	7	1
Career total		68	24

Scores and results list South Korea's goal tally first, score column indicates score after each Park goal.

List of international goals scored by Park Chu-young
No.	Date	Venue	Cap	Opponent	Score	Result	Competition
1	3 June 2005	Tashkent, Uzbekistan	1	Uzbekistan	1–1	1–1	2006 FIFA World Cup qualification
2	8 June 2005	Kuwait City, Kuwait	2	Kuwait	1–0	4–0	2006 FIFA World Cup qualification
3	21 January 2006	Riyadh, Saudi Arabia	8	Greece	1–1	1–1	Friendly
4	25 January 2006	Riyadh, Saudi Arabia	9	Finland	1–0	1–0	Friendly
5	1 March 2006	Seoul, South Korea	15	Angola	1–0	1–0	Friendly
6	17 February 2008	Chongqing, China	23	China	1–0	3–2	2008 EAFF Championship
7	17 February 2008	Chongqing, China	23	China	2–2	3–2	2008 EAFF Championship
8	31 May 2008	Seoul, South Korea	25	Jordan	2–0	2–2	2010 FIFA World Cup qualification
9	7 June 2008	Amman, Jordan	26	Jordan	1–0	1–0	2010 FIFA World Cup qualification
10	19 November 2008	Riyadh, Saudi Arabia	29	Saudi Arabia	2–0	2–0	2010 FIFA World Cup qualification
11	6 June 2009	Dubai, United Arab Emirates	33	United Arab Emirates	1–0	2–0	2010 FIFA World Cup qualification
12	12 August 2009	Seoul, South Korea	36	Paraguay	1–0	1–0	Friendly
13	5 September 2009	Seoul, South Korea	37	Australia	1–0	3–1	Friendly
14	24 May 2010	Saitama, Japan	39	Japan	2–0	2–0	Friendly
15	22 June 2010	Durban, South Africa	44	Nigeria	2–1	2–2	2010 FIFA World Cup
16	25 March 2011	Seoul, South Korea	50	Honduras	3–0	4–0	Friendly
17	3 June 2011	Seoul, South Korea	51	Serbia	1–0	2–1	Friendly
18	2 September 2011	Goyang, South Korea	54	Lebanon	1–0	6–0	2014 FIFA World Cup qualification
19	2 September 2011	Goyang, South Korea	54	Lebanon	2–0	6–0	2014 FIFA World Cup qualification
20	2 September 2011	Goyang, South Korea	54	Lebanon	4–0	6–0	2014 FIFA World Cup qualification
21	6 September 2011	Kuwait City, Kuwait	55	Kuwait	1–0	1–1	2014 FIFA World Cup qualification
22	11 October 2011	Suwon, South Korea	56	United Arab Emirates	1–0	2–1	2014 FIFA World Cup qualification
23	11 November 2011	Dubai, United Arab Emirates	57	United Arab Emirates	2–0	2–0	2014 FIFA World Cup qualification
24	5 March 2014	Athens, Greece	62	Greece	1–0	2–0	Friendly

== Honours ==
FC Seoul

- K League 1: 2016
- Korean FA Cup: 2015
- Korean League Cup: 2006

Monaco

- Coupe de France runner-up: 2009–10

Ulsan HD

- K League 1: 2022, 2023, 2024

South Korea U20

- AFC Youth Championship: 2004

South Korea U23

- Summer Olympics bronze medal: 2012
- Asian Games bronze medal: 2010

South Korea

- EAFF Championship: 2008

Individual

- AFC Youth Championship Most Valuable Player: 2004
- AFC Youth Championship top goalscorer: 2004
- AFC Youth Player of the Year: 2004
- K League All-Star Game Most Valuable Player: 2005
- K League All-Star: 2005, 2006, 2007, 2019
- K League Rookie of the Year: 2005
- K League 1 Best XI: 2005
- EAFF Championship top goalscorer: 2008
- Korean FA Goal of the Year: 2008, 2012
