= Zico Football Center =

Sports complex in Brazil

The Zico Football Center (ZFC) is a sports complex in Rio de Janeiro, Brazil. It was founded in 1996 by former Brazilian player Zico, and is the house of the ZFC Club – which competes on the B Series of the Rio State Championship.

The center hosted the football tournament matches during the 2007 Pan American Games.

In 2025, the Flamengo Feminino women’s team officially moved its base of training to the Centro de Futebol Zico (CFZ) in Recreio dos Bandeirantes, Rio de Janeiro, as part of a partnership to improve logistics and training conditions for the club.
