= Shin Bum-chul =

South Korean footballer

Personal information
- Date of birth: 27 September 1970 (age 56)
- Place of birth: South Korea
- Height: 1.85 m (6 ft 1 in)
- Position: Goalkeeper

Team information
- Current team: Suwon Samsung Bluewings

Youth career
- 1983–1987: Ajou University

Senior career*
Years	Team	Apps	(Gls)
1993–2000	Pusan Daewoo Royals	79	(0)
2000–2003	Suwon Samsung Bluewings	20	(0)
2004	Incheon United	9	(0)
Total		108	(0)

International career
1992	South Korea U-23	8	(0)
1992–1994	South Korea	17	(0)

Managerial career
- 2005–2010: Incheon United (GK Coach)
- 2011: FC Seoul (GK Coach)
- 2014–2016: Suwon Samsung Bluewings (GK Coach)
- * Club domestic league appearances and goals as of 30 June 2014

- Shin Bum-chul
- Hangul: 신범철
- Hanja: 申凡喆
- RR: Sin Beomcheol
- MR: Sin Pŏmch'ŏl

Shin Bum-chul (Korean: 신범철; born 27 September 1970) is a South Korean former football goalkeeper and current goalkeeping coach. He played at the 1992 Barcelona Olympic Games and 1994 Hiroshima Asian Games as national team player

== Honors and awards ==
=== Individual ===
- K-League Best XI: 1997
