= Kim Nam-chun =

South Korean footballer (1989–2020)

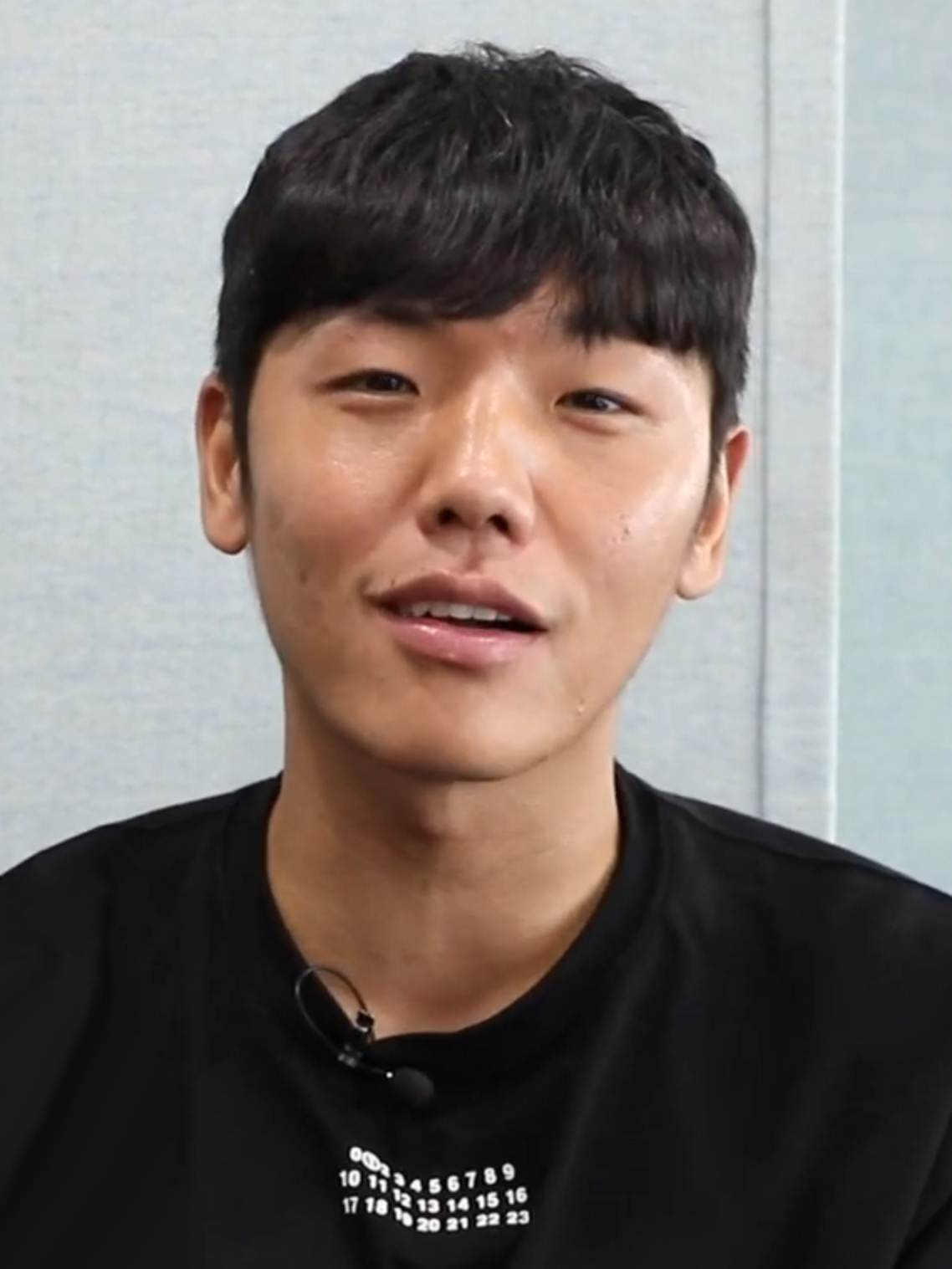
- Kim in 2019

Personal information
- Date of birth: 19 April 1989
- Place of birth: Incheon, South Korea
- Date of death: 30 October 2020 (aged 31)
- Place of death: Seoul, South Korea
- Height: 1.84 m (6 ft 0 in)
- Position: Centre-back

Youth career
- 2009–2012: Kwangwoon University

Senior career*
Years	Team	Apps	(Gls)
2013–2020	FC Seoul	76	(2)
2017–2018	→ Sangju Sangmu (military service)	38	(2)
Total		114	(4)
Korean name
Hangul	김남춘
Hanja	金南春
RR	Gim Namchun
MR	Kim Namch'un
- * Club domestic league appearances and goals as of 30 October 2020

Kim Nam-chun (Korean: 김남춘; Hanja: 金南春; 19 April 1989 – 30 October 2020) was a South Korean footballer who played as a defender.

== Club career ==
Kim Nam-chun made his debut for FC Seoul against Buriram United in the group stages of the AFC Champions League on 1 May 2013.

His first goal for FC Seoul came against Ulsan Hyundai in a K League Classic match on 9 October 2014.

== Death ==
On 30 October 2020, Kim Nam-chun was found dead in a parking lot in Songpa. South Korean police suspected that he died by suicide.

== Honours ==
=== Clubs ===
- K League 1: 2016
- FA Cup: 2015
