= Jung Han-min =

South Korean footballer (born 2001)

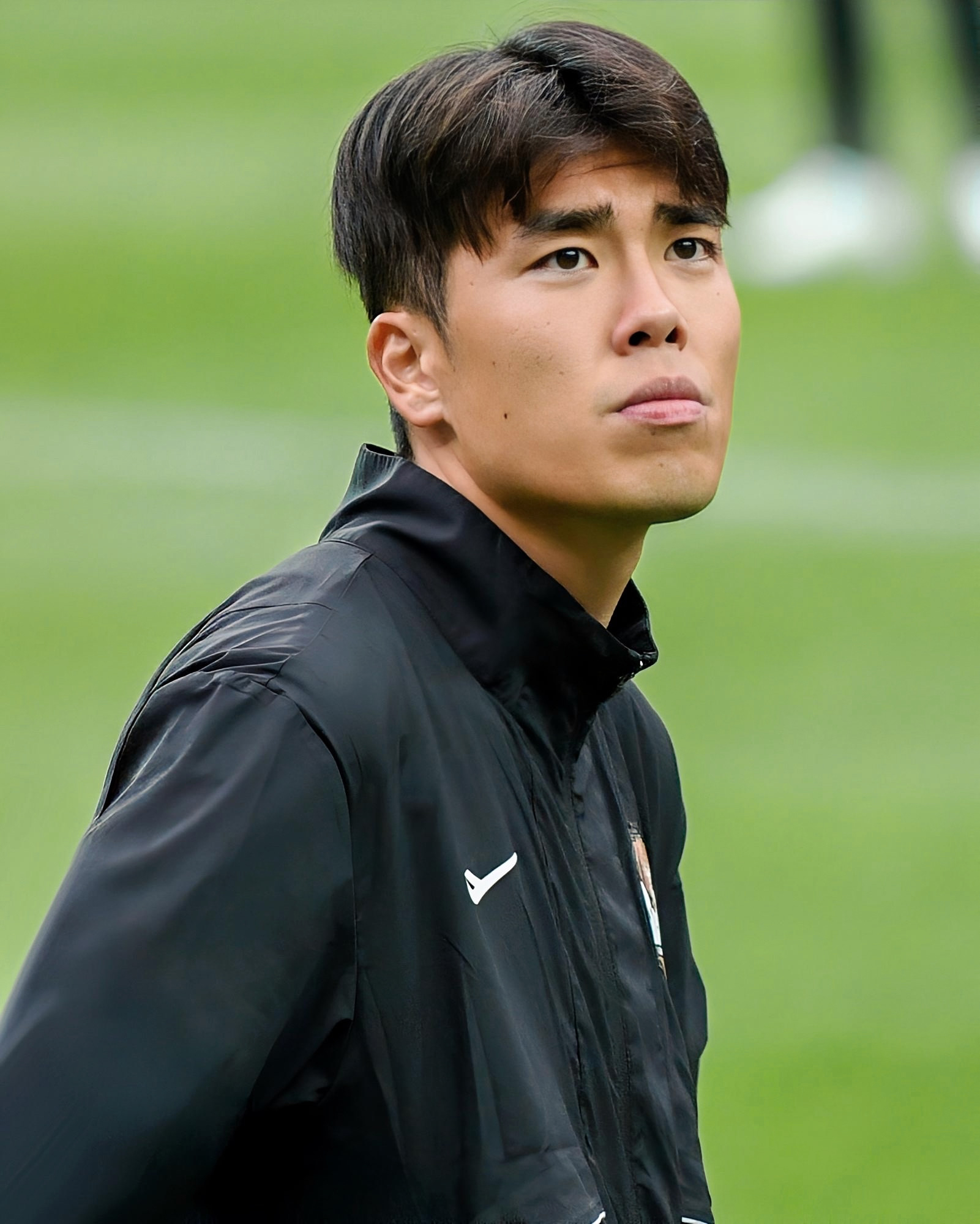
- Jung in 2025

Personal information
- Date of birth: 8 January 2001 (age 25)
- Place of birth: Uijeongbu, Gyeonggi, South Korea
- Height: 1.83 m (6 ft 0 in)
- Position: Forward

Team information
- Current team: Pohang Steelers
- Number: 37

Youth career
- 2014–2019: FC Seoul

Senior career*
Years	Team	Apps	(Gls)
2020–2025	FC Seoul	59	(5)
2023	→ Seongnam FC (loan)	25	(2)
2024	→ Gangwon FC (loan)	14	(3)
2026–	Pohang Steelers	4	(1)

International career^{‡}
2016–2018	South Korea U17	0 (Note: excludes fourteen appearances and eight goals against club youth teams.)	(0)
2019	South Korea U20	6	(1)
2022–2023	South Korea U23	2	(0)
- * Club domestic league appearances and goals as of 3 August 2026 ‡ National team caps and goals as of 25 February 2025 (UTC)

- Jung Han-min
- Hangul: 정한민
- Hanja: 鄭翰旻
- RR: Jeong Hanmin
- MR: Chŏng Hanmin

Jung Han-min (Korean: 정한민; born 8 January 2001) is a South Korean footballer currently playing as a forward for Pohang Steelers.

== Club career ==
Jung Han-min joined FC Seoul in 2020.

On 1 August 2020, Jung debuted in K League 1

== Career statistics ==
=== Club ===
As of match played 3 August 2026

Appearances and goals by club, season and competition
Club	Season	League			Cup		Continental		Total	
Club	Season	Division	Apps	Goals	Apps	Goals	Apps	Goals	Apps	Goals
FC Seoul	2020	K League 1	11	2	0	0	5	1	16	3
FC Seoul	2021	K League 1	15	1	1	0	—		16	1
FC Seoul	2022	K League 1	20	2	1	0	—		21	2
FC Seoul	2025	K League 1	13	0	1	0	0	0	14	0
FC Seoul	Total		59	5	3	0	5	1	67	6
Seongnam FC (loan)	2023	K League 2	25	2	2	1	—		27	3
Gangwon FC (loan)	2024	K League 1	14	3	2	0	—		16	3
Pohang Steelers	2026	K League 1	4	1	0	0	—		4	1
Career total			102	11	7	1	5	1	114	13
