= Lee In-gyu =

South Korean footballer (born 2000)

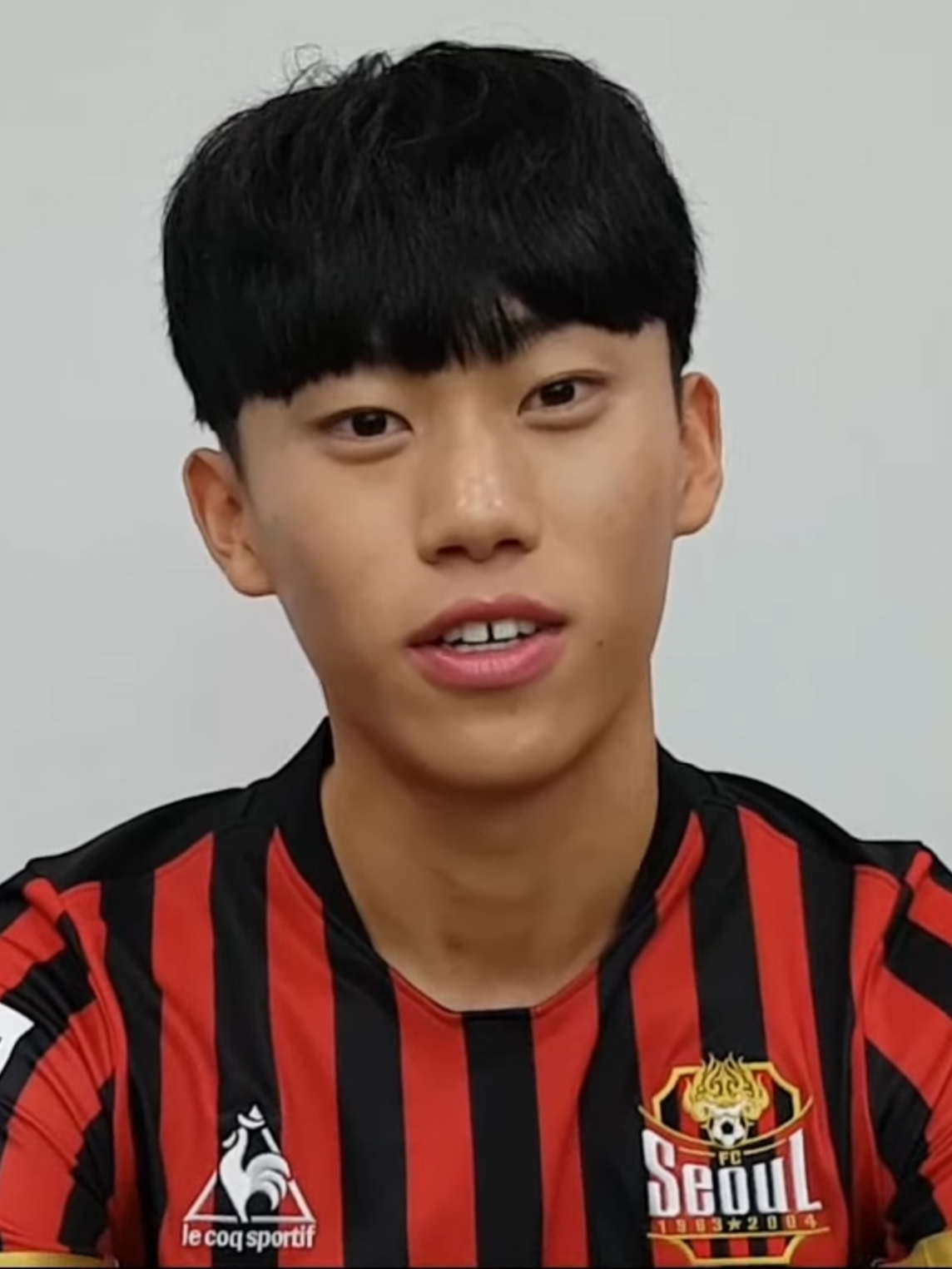
- Lee in February 2020

Personal information
- Date of birth: 16 January 2000 (age 26)
- Place of birth: Gwangmyeong, Gyeonggi-do, South Korea
- Height: 1.80 m (5 ft 11 in)
- Position: Forward

Team information
- Current team: Changwon City FC
- Number: 7

Youth career
- 2013–2018: FC Seoul

Senior career*
Years	Team	Apps	(Gls)
2019–2022	FC Seoul	14	(1)
2022	→ Hwaseong FC (on loan)	21	(3)
2023	Yangju Citizen	16	(4)
2023–	FC Seoul	13	(5)

International career^{‡}
2019	South Korea U20	1	(0)
- * Club domestic league appearances and goals as of 10 February 2022 ‡ National team caps and goals as of 16 December 2019

- Lee In-gyu
- Hangul: 이인규
- Hanja: 李仁揆
- RR: I Ingyu
- MR: I In'gyu

Lee In-gyu (Korean: 이인규; born 16 January 2000) is a South Korean footballer currently playing as a forward for Changwon City FC of K3 League.

== Career statistics ==
=== Club ===
As of 10 February 2022.

Club	Season	League			Cup		Continental		Other		Total	
Club	Season	Division	Apps	Goals	Apps	Goals	Apps	Goals	Apps	Goals	Apps	Goals
FC Seoul	2019	K League 1	6	1	0	0	-		0	0	6	1
FC Seoul	2020	K League 1	0	0	0	0	4	1	0	0	4	1
FC Seoul	2021	K League 1	8	0	0	0	-		0	0	8	0
Hwaseong FC	2022	K3 League	0	0	0	0	-		0	0	0	0
Career total			14	1	0	0	4	1	0	0	18	2
