= Jung Jae-yoon =

South Korean footballer (born 1981)

Personal information
- Full name: Jung Jae-yoon
- Date of birth: May 28, 1981 (age 45)
- Place of birth: South Korea
- Height: 1.81 m (5 ft 11 in)
- Position: Midfielder

Team information
- Current team: FC Seoul (scout)

Youth career
- 2000–2003: Hongik University

Senior career*
Years	Team	Apps	(Gls)
2004–2007	FC Seoul	0	(0)

Managerial career
- 2012–: FC Seoul (scout)
- * Club domestic league appearances and goals as of 27 December 2007 ‡ National team caps and goals as of 27 December 2007

Jung Jae-yoon (Korean: 정재윤; born May 28, 1981) is a South Korean footballer. He played for FC Seoul, and later became a scout for the team.
