= Cha Oh-yeon =

South Korean footballer (born 1998)

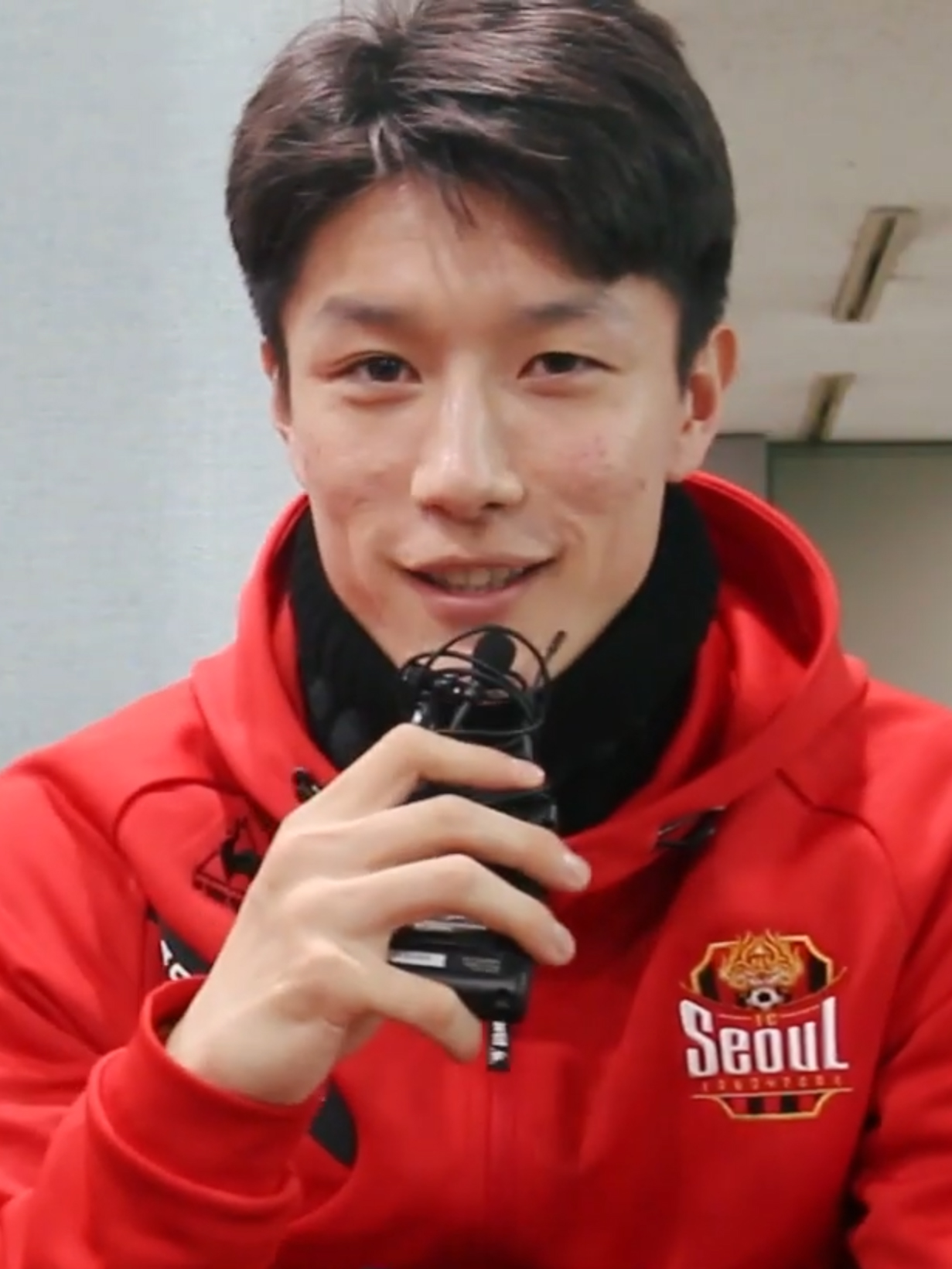
- Cha in 2020

Personal information
- Date of birth: 15 April 1998 (age 28)
- Place of birth: Uijeongbu, Gyeonggi, South Korea
- Height: 1.86 m (6 ft 1 in)
- Position: Midfielder

Youth career
- 2014–2016: FC Seoul
- 2017–2019: Hanyang University

Senior career*
Years	Team	Apps	(Gls)
2020–2023	FC Seoul	12	(0)
2023	→ Cheonan City FC (loan)	23	(0)
2024–2025	Hwaseong FC	16	(1)

International career^{‡}
2016–2018	South Korea U17	14	(8)
2019–	South Korea U20	6	(1)
- * Club domestic league appearances and goals as of 7 January 2026 (UTC) ‡ National team caps and goals as of 7 August 2020 (UTC)

- Cha Oh-yeon
- Hangul: 차오연
- Hanja: 車五硏
- RR: Cha Oyeon
- MR: Ch'a Oyŏn

Cha Oh-yeon (Korean: 차오연; born 15 April 1998) is a South Korean footballer currently playing as a midfielder.

== Club career ==
Cha Oh-yeon joined FC Seoul in 2020.

On 7 August 2020, Cha Oh-Yeon debuted in K League 1

ON 6 January 2023, he was loaned to Cheonan City FC of K League 2.

== Career statistics ==
=== Club ===
As of 7 November 2021.

Club	Season	League			Cup		Continental		Other		Total	
Club	Season	Division	Apps	Goals	Apps	Goals	Apps	Goals	Apps	Goals	Apps	Goals
FC Seoul	2020	K League 1	3	0	0	0	3	0	—		6	0
FC Seoul	2021	K League 1	9	0	0	0	—		—		9	0
Career total			12	0	0	0	3	0	0	0	15	0
