= Kim Byung-chae =

South Korean footballer (born 1981)

Kim Byung-Chae
Personal information
- Full name: Kim Byung-Chae
- Date of birth: April 14, 1981 (age 45)
- Place of birth: Seoul, South Korea
- Height: 1.81 m (5 ft 11 in)
- Position: Midfielder

Senior career*
Years	Team	Apps	(Gls)
2000–2005	Anyang LG Cheetahs / FC Seoul	7	(0)
2003–2004	Gwangju Sangmu (military service)	60	(6)
2006	Gyeongnam FC	3	(0)
2007–2008	Busan IPark	3	(0)
2009	Daejeon KHNP	12	(0)
2010	Buriram PEA	0	(0)
2010	→Buriram F.C.(Loan)	5	(0)
2011	Chainat F.C.		
2012	Bangkok		

International career^{‡}
2000	South Korea U-20	12	(9)

Managerial career
- 2016: FC Seoul U-12
- * Club domestic league appearances and goals as of 1 April 2015 ‡ National team caps and goals as of March 29, 2008

Kim Byung-Chae (born April 14, 1981) is a South Korean football midfielder. He currently plays for Chainat F.C. in the Thailand Division 1 League.

He played for several clubs, including FC Seoul, Gwangju Sangmu FC (Military service), Gyeongnam FC and Busan IPark, Daejeon Hydro & Nuclear Power FC in South Korea.

He was a member of the South Korea U-20 team.

== Club career statistics ==
Club performance			League		Cup		League Cup		Continental		Total	
Season	Club	League	Apps	Goals	Apps	Goals	Apps	Goals	Apps	Goals	Apps	Goals
South Korea			League		KFA Cup		League Cup		Asia		Total	
2000	Anyang LG Cheetahs	K-League	0	0	?	?	1	0	?	?		
2001	Anyang LG Cheetahs	K-League	2	0	?	?	0	0	-			
2002	Anyang LG Cheetahs	K-League	0	0	?	?	0	0	?	?		
2003	Gwangju Sangmu Bulsajo	K-League	39	3	2	0	-		-		41	3
2004	Gwangju Sangmu Bulsajo	K-League	21	3	0	0	12	1	-		33	4
2005	FC Seoul	K-League	5	0	0	0	2	0	-		7	0
2006	Gyeongnam FC	K-League	3	0	1	0	2	0	-		6	0
2007	Busan I'Park	K-League	3	0	0	0	0	0	-		3	0
2008	Busan I'Park	K-League	0	0	0	0	0	0	-		0	0
2009	Busan I'Park	K-League	0	0	0	0	0	0	-		0	0
2009	Daejeon KHNP	Korea National League	12	0	0	0	-		-		12	0
Total	South Korea		85	6			17	1				
Career total			85	6			17	1				
