= Jung Hyun-cheol =

South Korean footballer (born 1993)

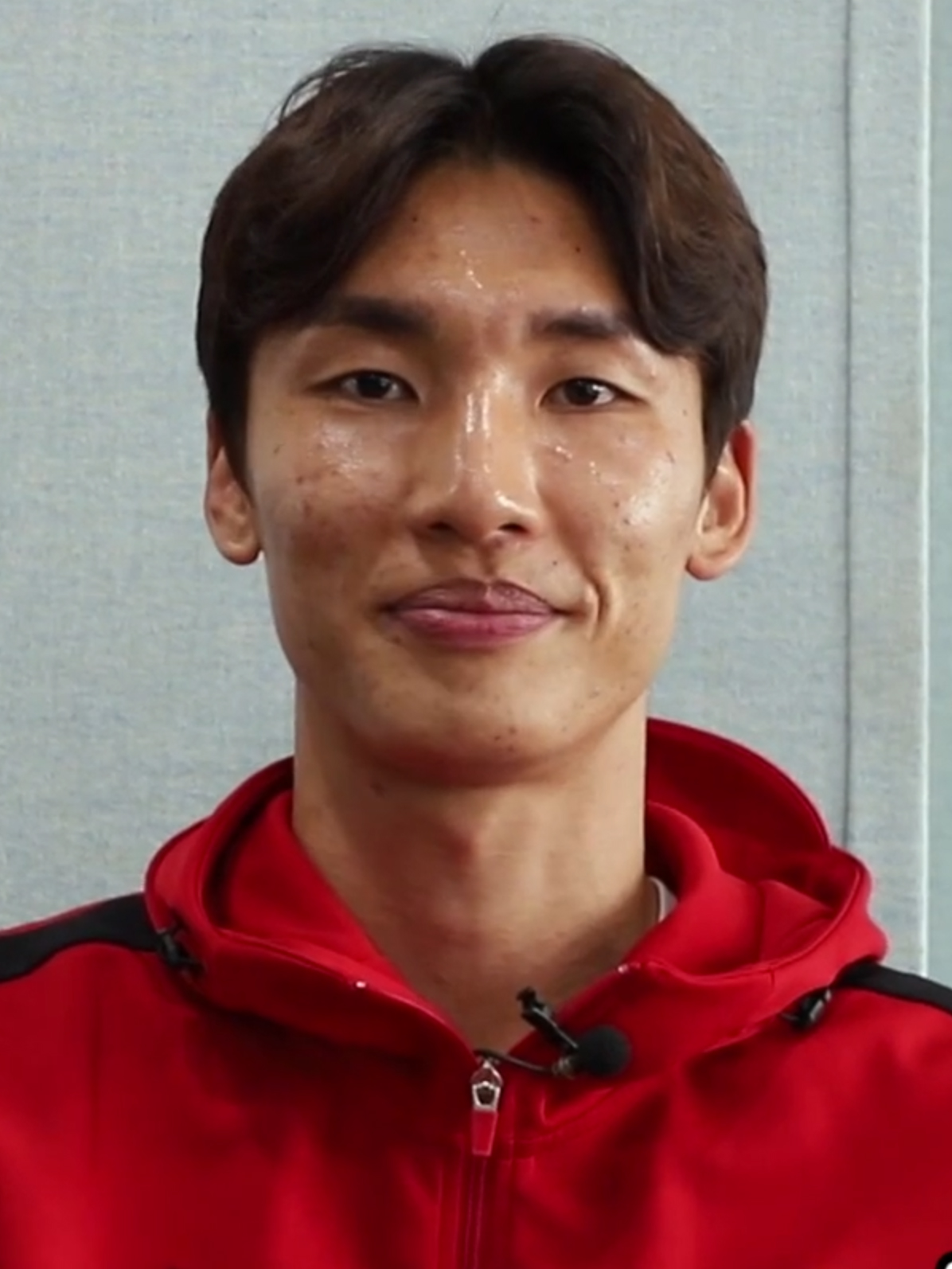
- Jung in September 2019

Personal information
- Full name: Jung Hyun-cheol
- Date of birth: 26 April 1993 (age 33)
- Place of birth: South Korea
- Height: 1.87 m (6 ft 1 1/2 in)
- Positions: Midfielder; defender

Team information
- Current team: Daegu FC
- Number: 47

Youth career
- 2012–2014: Dongguk University

Senior career*
Years	Team	Apps	(Gls)
2015–2017	Gyeongnam FC	79	(13)
2018–2023	FC Seoul	64	(2)
2021–2022	→ Gimcheon Sangmu (military)	34	(2)
2024	Gyeongnam FC	16	(0)
2025–	Daegu FC	1	(0)

International career^{‡}
2012–2013	South Korea U-20	5	(1)
- * Club domestic league appearances and goals as of 13 January 2024 ‡ National team caps and goals as of 1 July 2016

Jung Hyun-cheol (Korean: 정현철; born 26 April 1993) is a South Korean footballer who plays for Daegu FC.

== Club career ==
He joined Gyeongnam FC in January 2015.

He joined Gyeongnam FC again for the 2024 season of K League 2 after leaving FC Seoul.

== International career ==
He played in 2013 FIFA U-20 World Cup and scored for South Korea U-20 team in the quarterfinals.

== Club statistics ==
=== Club ===
Club performance			League		Cup		Continental		Other		Total	
Season	Club	League	Apps	Goals	Apps	Goals	Apps	Goals	Apps	Goals	Apps	Goals
South Korea			League		KFA Cup		Asia		Other		Total	
2015	Gyeongnam FC	K League 2	14	1	1	0	-		-		15	1
2016	Gyeongnam FC	K League 2	32	5	0	0	-		-		32	5
2017	Gyeongnam FC	K League 2	33	7	2	0	-		-		35	7
2018	FC Seoul	K League 1	14	0	2	0	-		2	1	18	1
2019	FC Seoul	K League 1	30	1	1	0	-		-		31	1
2020	FC Seoul	K League 1	10	0	1	1	0	0	-		11	1
Total	South Korea		133	14	7	1	0	0	2	1	142	16
Career total			133	14	7	1	0	0	2	1	142	16

== Honours ==
South Korea U-20

- AFC U-19 Championship: 2012
