= Scout (association football) =

Sporting talent spotter

A football scout attends football matches on the behalf of clubs to collect intelligence on young players. Typically, there are two types of scouts: player scouts and tactical scouts.

Player scouts or physical scouts evaluate the talent of footballers with a view to signing them on a professional contract for their employers. Some scouts focus on discovering promising young players while others are employed to run the rule on potential signings. Smaller clubs might only scout within their own country region, while larger and richer clubs can have extensive international scouting networks.

Tactical scouts assess the matches of upcoming opponents of the club and prepare dossiers for their teams' tactical preparations. Instead of identifying talent in these matches, the scout assesses the team and each individual player to identify the relative tactical threats and weaknesses in the opposition. Tactical scouts are typically full-time employees of clubs as their knowledge and findings are valuable to clubs.

Relatively few football scouts are employed full-time, even in the largest professional clubs. By and large, their numbers are made up by talent scouts, the vast majority of which work part-time, and a club may hire several hundred of scouts.

Not all scouts are actually employed by football clubs. For instance, the creators of the Football Manager computer game have their own international network of scouts.

== Finding players ==
A player scout typically attends as many football matches as possible to evaluate targets first hand. Scouts who wish to identify promising young players typically attend lower-league club games, where their talent can be compared to older peers, or under-16, 18 and 21 international tournaments. Scouts may also receive tips from agents, peers and club colleagues.

== Evaluating players ==
On the first evaluation, player scouts determine whether a player has the desired technical attributes to succeed at the sport. They then highlight this player to the club management. Some of the desired attributes that scouts look in players include:

- Goalkeepers: good reflexes, communication with defence, one-on-one ability, command of the penalty area and aerial intelligence.
- Centre-backs: good heading and tackling ability, height, bravery in attempting challenges, concentration.
- Full-backs: pace, stamina, anticipation, tackling and marking abilities, work rate and team responsibility.
- Central midfielders: stamina, passing ability, team responsibility, positioning, marking abilities.
- Wingers: pace, technical ability like dribbling and close control, off-the-ball intelligence, creativity.
- Forwards: finishing ability, composure, technical ability, heading ability, pace, off-the-ball intelligence.

Once a player has been recommended to a club, the club may continue to monitor his progress over a period from as little as a few months to as many as a few seasons. Scouts continue to evaluate whether a player has turned in consistent performances, if he has retained his appetite for team responsibilities, and so on.

When the club is satisfied that a player fits the requirements of the club, the club may extend the invitation to the player to attend a trial at the club, where scouts and coaching staff evaluate the player's suitability for the club in terms of his personality and training attitude. Clubs also tend to perform background checks on the player. A trial at the club allows the club to evaluate the standard of the player against players already on its roster. However, in the top leagues, players are typically not allowed to leave training to undertake trials unless they are already out of contract and need to prove their fitness and ability to any clubs interested. Smaller clubs in need of the cash for transfers may also be more amenable to allowing their players to leave on trials.

Once the player has passed these evaluations, the club then starts negotiations with a view to a transfer, either a permanent transfer, a loan, or co-ownership (as is common in the Italian leagues).

== Tactical scouting ==
Tactical scouts watch the games of a club's upcoming opponents to assess their overall ability, as well as their specific threats and weaknesses. Almost every major club side in the world is known to employ the extensive services of tactical scouts. From these assessments, tactical scouts compile dossiers with recommendations to club coaches and players on their actions on-field.

In major clubs, it is typical for scouts to assemble detailed reports and videos on specific opponent players. These DVDs and reports are watched, read and reviewed by players a few days before the game. Nearer towards the game, it is typical for coaches to convene meetings to summarise the findings of these reports and the approach recommended to the players.

More specifically, tactical scouts:

- Offer advice on the team's general approach, for example, if the opposition team should be attacked with sustained pressure or to invite them onto the attack and strike on the counter. The scout also assesses the team's general passing pattern and playing tempo.
- Identify the opposition's key threats and ways which they can be dealt with. For instance, a right winger who is very weak with his left foot may be marked in such a manner as to force him infield towards his weaker side.
- Highlight the opposition's key weaknesses, particularly weaknesses in strength, pace, stamina and concentration that can be exploited by the team's strengths.
- Wingers are assessed according to which parts of the field they cut in towards goal or cut out to stay wide, and their preferred moves.
- Penalty kick takers are assessed according to which sides and corners they prefer aiming their kicks at. Famously, a scribbled scouting report on penalty kick takers aided Jens Lehmann's Germany to a victory over Argentina in a penalty shootout during the World Cup 2006 quarter-final.
- Identify the opposition team's favoured attack set piece movements, as well as their deficiencies when defending set pieces.

Tactical Scouting also involves the use of technology and analytics to assess movements of footballers both on and off the ball. Football itself has many variables which specific technologies can home in on and bring out. And as a result, clubs can even go as far as drawing up shortlists of desired players whose statistics match that of their desired objectives, all without the scout even leaving his/her training ground. Scout can gather the data, watch footage and save money on travelling the world to find talent.

== Importance of scouting ==
With the modernisation and globalisation of football, scouting has grown in importance. Competition to search for young talents is extremely strong.

The importance of scouting offers football clubs with several distinct advantages:

- Global reach: Scouting allows clubs to cast the largest possible net to find players from all around the world.
- Cheap players: Players from lower leagues can be available at cheaper transfer prices, and command smaller wages. In particular, a talented cheap player can help a football club to progress in a league, knockout cup competition, or into continental cup competition, potentially even ahead of other clubs with superior financial clout.
- Specialist tactical advice: Scouting opposition matches allows clubs to build up a knowledge base about opponents that club coaches would otherwise not have the time and resources to research on their own.

== Professional development and methodologies ==
The transition from informal talent spotting to data-driven recruitment has led to a variety of educational pathways. Professional standards are increasingly defined by national football associations and international scouting bodies:

- National associations: Organizations such as the Royal Dutch Football Association (KNVB), The Football Association (The FA), and German Football Association (DFB) provide formal scouting education as part of their technical programs.
- International bodies: The UEFA Academy offers specialized courses in elite player identification and recruitment for professional clubs.
- Independent providers: Organizations like the International Professional Scouting Organisation (IPSO) and the Professional Football Scouts Association (PFSA) and many others offer vocational certifications in tactical analysis and talent identification.

Modern methodology is increasingly dictated by integrated digital workflows. These frameworks prioritize a three-pronged approach to recruitment:

1. Data scouting: The use of statistical databases and algorithms to filter players based on performance metrics.
2. Video scouting: The use of digital platforms to review match footage and tag specific player actions.
3. Live scouting: The traditional method of attending matches to evaluate a player's off-the-ball behavior, personality, and physical presence.
