= Kang Sang-hee =

South Korean footballer (born 1998)

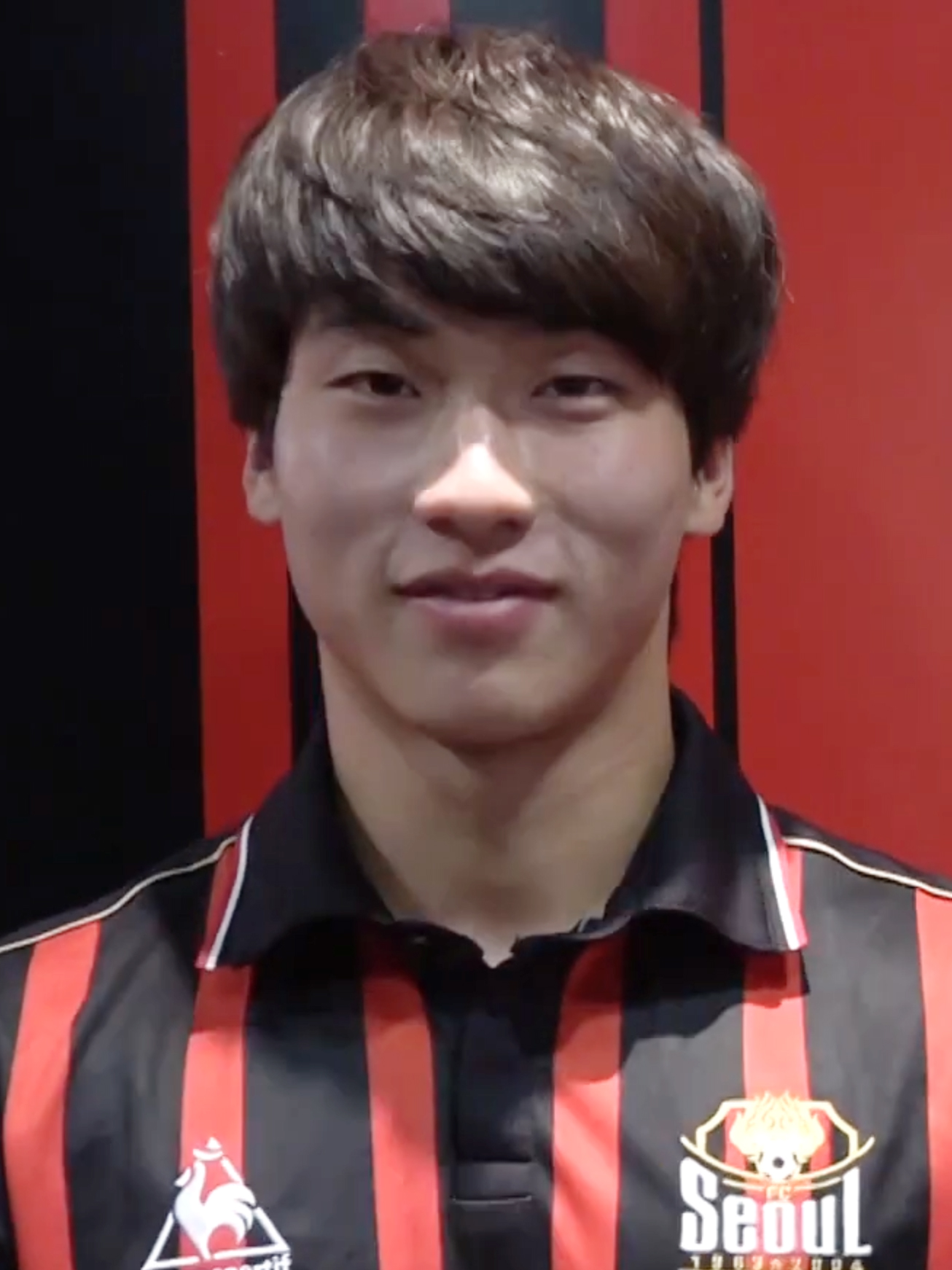
- Kang with FC Seoul in December 2019

Personal information
- Date of birth: 7 March 1998 (age 28)
- Place of birth: South Korea
- Height: 1.83 m (6 ft 0 in)
- Position: Defender

Youth career
- 2013–2016: FC Seoul
- 2017–2019: Sunmoon University

Senior career*
Years	Team	Apps	(Gls)
2020–2023	FC Seoul	17	(1)
- * Club domestic league appearances and goals as of 13 January 2024 (UTC) ‡ National team caps and goals as of 24 October 2021 (UTC)

- Kang Sang-hee
- Hangul: 강상희
- Hanja: 姜常熙
- RR: Gang Sanghui
- MR: Kang Sanghŭi

Kang Sang-hee (Korean: 강상희; born 7 March 1998) is a South Korean footballer currently playing as a defender.

== Club career ==
Kang Sang-hee joined FC Seoul in 2020.

On 14 June 2020, Kang debuted in K League 1.

He left the club at the end of 2023 season.

== Career statistics ==
=== Club ===
As of 10 September 2022

Club	Season	League			Cup		Continental		Other		Total	
Club	Season	Division	Apps	Goals	Apps	Goals	Apps	Goals	Apps	Goals	Apps	Goals
FC Seoul	2020	K League 1	3	0	0	0	0	0	—		3	0
FC Seoul	2021	K League 1	9	1	0	0	—		—		9	1
FC Seoul	2022	K League 1	6	0	1	0	—		—		7	0
Career total			18	1	1	0	0	0	0	0	19	1
