= Lee Won-jun =

South Korean footballer

Lee Won-Jun
Personal information
- Full name: Lee Won-Jun
- Date of birth: April 2, 1972 (age 54)
- Place of birth: South Korea
- Height: 1.80 m (5 ft 11 in)
- Position: Midfielder

Team information
- Current team: FC Seoul (Scout)

Youth career
- 1991–1994: Chung-Ang University

Senior career*
Years	Team	Apps	(Gls)
1995–1998	Anyang LG Cheetahs	25	(0)

Managerial career
- 2006: FC Seoul Reserves (coach)
- 2007–2011: FC Seoul U18 (coach)
- 2011: FC Seoul (coach)
- 2012: FC Seoul (scout)
- 2013: FC Seoul U18 (coach)
- 2014–: FC Seoul (scout)
- 2020: FC Seoul (caretaker)
- * Club domestic league appearances and goals as of 27 December 2007 ‡ National team caps and goals as of 27 December 2007

Lee Won-Jun (Korean: 이원준, born April 2, 1972) is a South Korean footballer. He is currently caretaker manager of FC Seoul.

== Club career ==
He played for FC Seoul, then known as Anyang LG Cheetahs.

== Honours ==
- FA Cup: 1998
