= Kim Woo-hong =

South Korean footballer (born 1995)

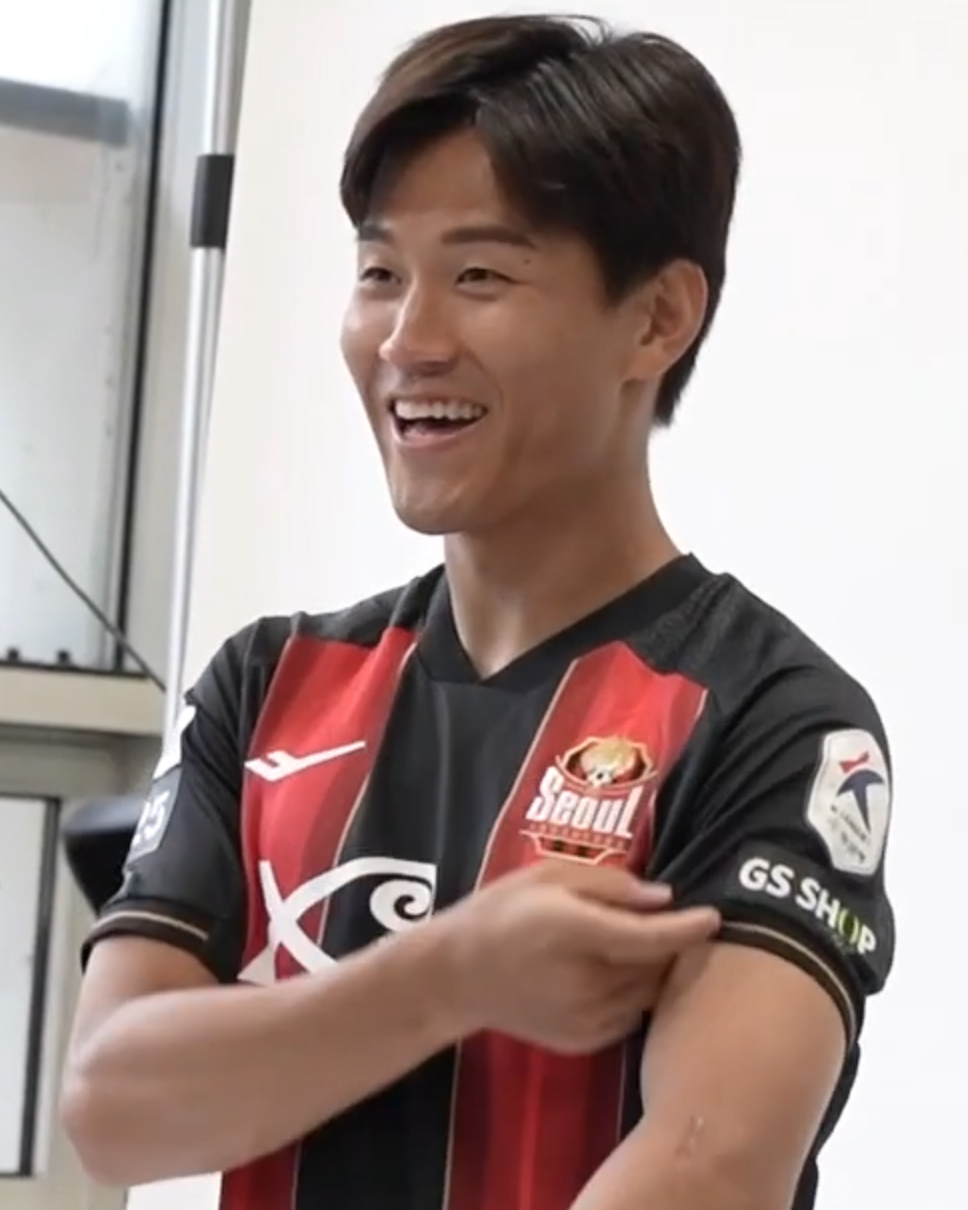
- Kim in 2022

Personal information
- Date of birth: 11 January 1995 (age 31)
- Place of birth: Yeongju, South Korea
- Height: 1.74 m (5 ft 8 1/2 in)
- Position: Winger

Team information
- Current team: Paju Citizen FC
- Number: 77

Youth career
- 2009–2011: Real Madrid
- 2011–2014: Almería

Senior career*
Years	Team	Apps	(Gls)
2013–2014	Almería B	3	(0)
2014–2015	Deportivo Fabril	26	(2)
2018–2022	FC Seoul	1	(0)
2020–2022	→ FC Namdong (loan)		
2023	Busan Transportation Corporation FC		
2024–	Paju Citizen FC		

International career
2011	South Korea U17	3	(0)
- * Club domestic league appearances and goals as of 17 February 2023

- Kim Woo-hong
- Hangul: 김우홍
- Hanja: 金祐泓
- RR: Gim Uhong
- MR: Kim Uhong

Kim Woo-hong (Korean: 김우홍; born 11 January 1995) is a South Korean footballer who plays as a winger for Busan Transportation Corporation FC.

== Club career ==
=== FC Seoul ===
Kim Woo-hong joined FC Seoul on 7 January 2018. He made his K League 1 debut on 1 September 2018 against Gangwon FC.
