= Hwang Hyun-soo =

South Korean footballer (born 1995)

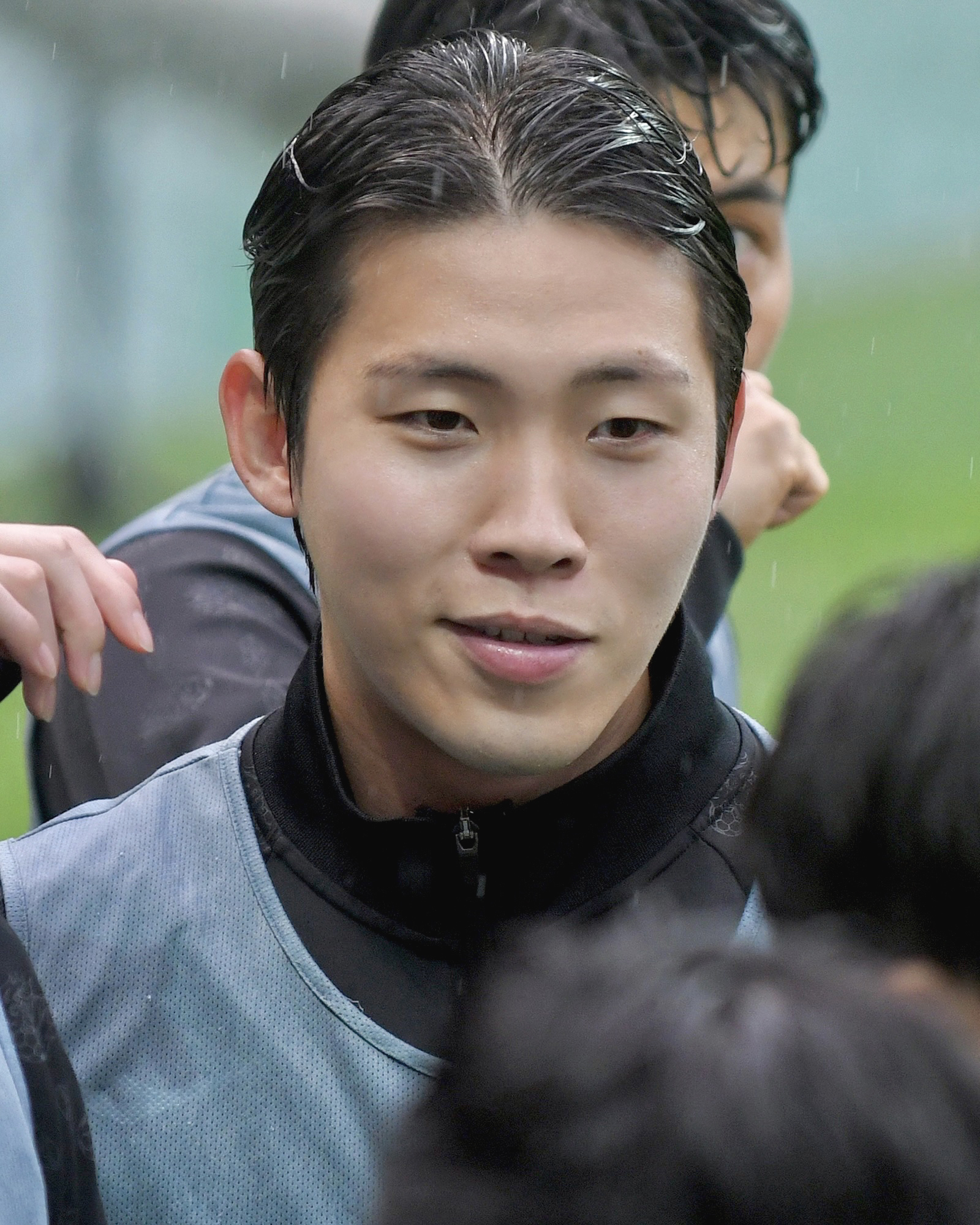
- Hwang in 2023

Personal information
- Full name: Hwang Hyun-soo
- Date of birth: 22 July 1995 (age 31)
- Place of birth: Daegu, South Korea
- Height: 1.83 m (6 ft 0 in)
- Position: Centre-back

Team information
- Current team: Ayutthaya United
- Number: 2

Youth career
- 2011–2013: FC Seoul

Senior career*
Years	Team	Apps	(Gls)
2014–2024	FC Seoul	129	(9)
2025–	Ayutthaya United	33	(6)

International career^{‡}
2014	South Korea U20	2	(0)
2018	South Korea U23	13	(1)
Medal record
Representing South Korea
Men's football
Asian Games
Gold medal – first place	2018 Jakarta-Palembang	Team
- * Club domestic league appearances and goals as of 9 May 2023 ‡ National team caps and goals as of 1 September 2018

- Korean name
- Hangul: 황현수
- Hanja: 黃賢秀
- RR: Hwang Hyeonsu
- MR: Hwang Hyŏnsu

Hwang Hyun-soo (Korean: 황현수; Hanja: 黃賢秀; born 22 July 1995) is a South Korean footballer who Current played as a defender for Ayutthaya United.

== Club career ==
Hwang joined FC Seoul in 2014. He made his K League 1 debut against Jeonbuk Hyundai Motors.

He scored his first goal for the club on 2 August 2017 against Gangwon FC in a 3-1 victory at the Seoul World Cup Stadium.

== International career ==
Hwang represented South Korea U-23 at the 2018 Asian Games where he helped South Korea to win a gold medal, receiving military privileges as a result along with the rest of the team.

== Club career statistics ==
Club	Season	League			Cup		continental		Total	
Club	Season	Division	Apps	Goals	Apps	Goals	Apps	Goals	Apps	Goals
FC Seoul	2014	K League 1	0	0	0	0	0	0	0	0
FC Seoul	2015	K League 1	0	0	0	0	0	0	0	0
FC Seoul	2016	K League 1	0	0	0	0	0	0	0	0
FC Seoul	2017	K League 1	26	3	2	0	3	0	31	3
FC Seoul	2018	K League 1	14	0	1	0	-		15	0
FC Seoul	2019	K League 1	36	5	1	0	-		37	5
FC Seoul	2020	K League 1	19	1	1	0	7	1	27	2
FC Seoul	2021	K League 1	22	0	1	0	-		23	0
FC Seoul	2022	K League 1	7	0	1	0	-		8	0
FC Seoul	2023	K League 1	14	0	1	0	-		15	0
FC Seoul	2024	K League 1	3	0	2	1	-		5	1
Career total			141	9	10	1	10	1	161	11
