= Yoon Si-ho =

South Korean footballer (born 1984)

Yoon Si-Ho
Personal information
- Full name: Yoon Si-Ho
- Date of birth: 12 May 1984 (age 42)
- Place of birth: South Korea
- Height: 1.83 m (6 ft 0 in)
- Position: Full back

Team information
- Current team: Trat
- Number: 23

Senior career*
Years	Team	Apps	(Gls)
2003–2010	FC Seoul	18	(0)
2005–2006	→ Police (Military service)		
2011	Daegu FC	25	(0)
2012	FC Seoul	3	(0)
2013	Jeonnam Dragons	0	(0)
2013–2014	Gyeongju KHNP	0	(0)
2014	Pattaya United		
2015	Trat		
- * Club domestic league appearances and goals as of 6 July 2013

- Yoon Si-ho
- Hangul: 윤시호
- Hanja: 尹施淏
- RR: Yun Siho
- MR: Yun Siho

Yoon Si-Ho (Korean: 윤시호; born 12 May 1984) is a South Korean footballer who plays as full back for Gyeongju Korea Hydro & Nuclear Power FC. He was named Yoon Hong-Chang (윤홍창; 尹洪唱) but was later renamed Yoon Si-Ho.

== Club career ==
On 25 February 2011, Yoon moved to Daegu FC. Yoon made his Daegu FC debut on 5 March against Gwangju FC at Gwangju World Cup Stadium in a 2–3 loss. After a one-year stint with Daegu, he returned to FC Seoul.
