= Lee Jung-youl =

South Korean football player (born 1981)

Lee Jung-Youl 이정열
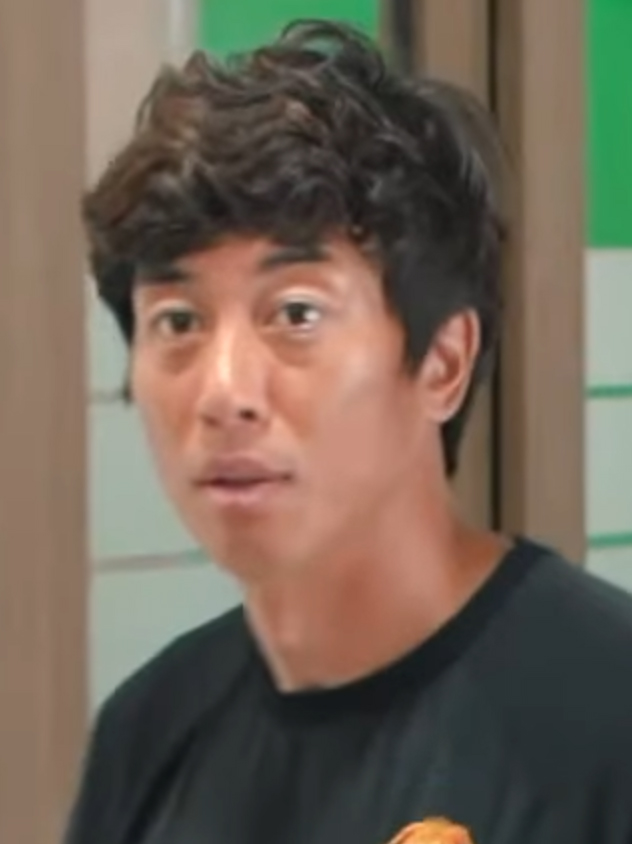
- Lee in September 2020

Personal information
- Full name: Lee Jung-Youl
- Date of birth: August 16, 1981 (age 45)
- Place of birth: Seoul, South Korea
- Height: 1.83 m (6 ft 0 in)
- Position: Center back

Team information
- Current team: Daejeon Citizen
- Number: 34

Youth career
- Soongsil University

Senior career*
Years	Team	Apps	(Gls)
2004–2007	FC Seoul	43	(0)
2008	Incheon United	3	(0)
2008	Seongnam Ilhwa Chunma	0	(0)
2009	Chunnam Dragons	4	(0)
2010–2012	FC Seoul	7	(0)
2012–2013	Daejeon Citizen	13	(0)

International career
2003–2004	South Korea U-23	7	(0)
- * Club domestic league appearances and goals as of 16 December 2013

- Lee Jung-youl
- Hangul: 이정열
- Hanja: 李正烈
- RR: I Jeongyeol
- MR: I Chŏngyŏl

Lee Jung-Youl (born August 16, 1981) is a South Korean football player who plays for Daejeon Citizen.

His previous clubs were Incheon United, Seongnam Ilhwa Chunma and Chunnam Dragons.

He was part of the South Korea football team in 2004 Summer Olympics, who finished second in Group A, making it through to the next round, before being defeated by silver medal winners Paraguay.

== Club career statistics ==
Club performance			League		Cup		League Cup		Continental		Total	
Season	Club	League	Apps	Goals	Apps	Goals	Apps	Goals	Apps	Goals	Apps	Goals
South Korea			League		KFA Cup		League Cup		Asia		Total	
2004	FC Seoul	K-League	20	0	2	0	0	0	-		22	0
2005	FC Seoul	K-League	8	0	0	0	11	0	-		19	0
2006	FC Seoul	K-League	0	0	0	0	0	0	-		0	0
2007	FC Seoul	K-League	15	0	0	0	6	0	-		21	0
2008	Incheon United	K-League	3	0	1	0	5	0	-		9	0
2008	Seongnam Ilhwa Chunma	K-League	1	0	0	0	0	0	-		1	0
2009	Chunnam Dragons	K-League	4	0	0	0	3	1			7	1
2010	FC Seoul	K-League	5	0	1	0	0	0	-		6	0
2011	FC Seoul	K-League	2	0	0	0	1	0			3	0
2012	FC Seoul	K-League	0	0	0	0	0	0			0	0
Total	South Korea		58	0	4	0	26	1			88	1
Career total			58	0	4	0	26	1			88	1
