= Jung Won-jin =

South Korean footballer (born 1994)

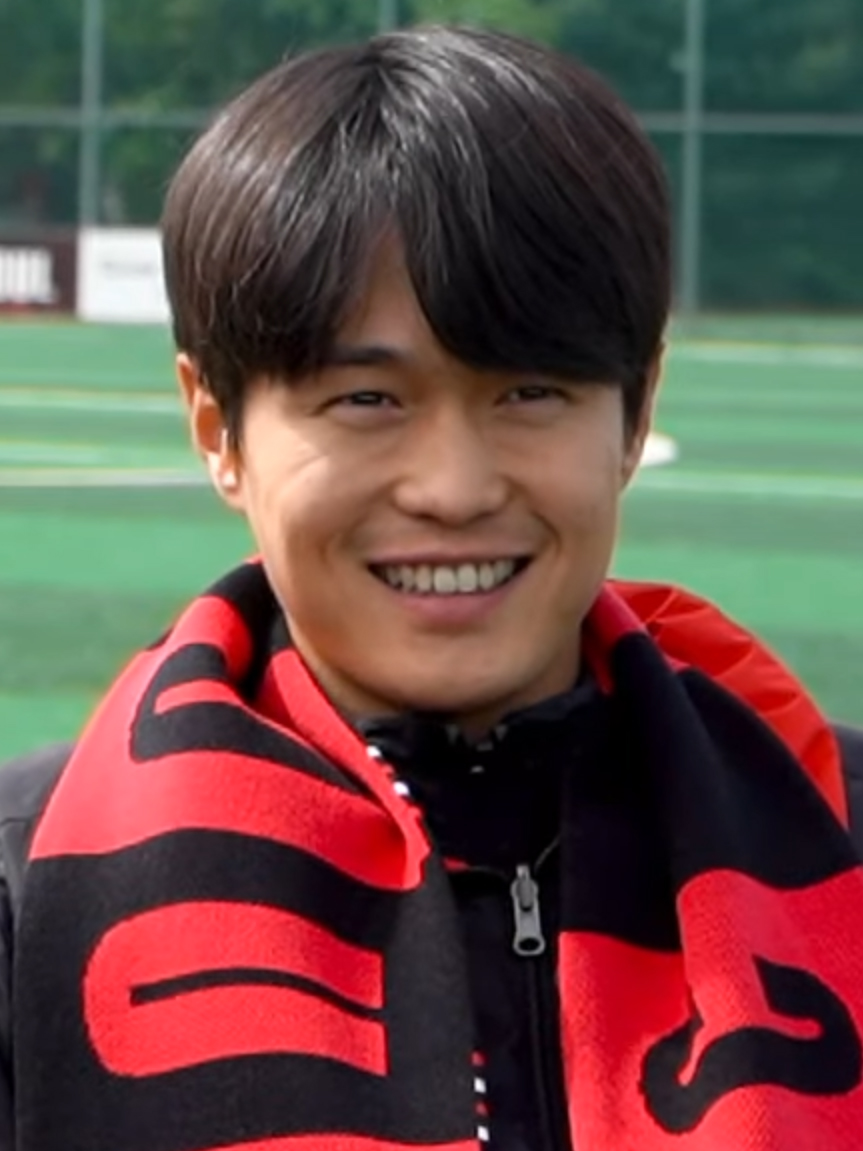
- Jung in May 2020

Personal information
- Full name: Jung Won-jin
- Date of birth: 10 August 1994 (age 32)
- Place of birth: South Korea
- Height: 1.76 m (5 ft 9 in)
- Positions: Forward; midfielder

Team information
- Current team: Incheon
- Number: 88

Youth career
- 2013–2015: Yeungnam University

Senior career*
Years	Team	Apps	(Gls)
2016–2018	Pohang Steelers	29	(1)
2017	→ Gyeongnam (loan)	34	(10)
2018–2019	FC Seoul	19	(3)
2020–2021	→ Sangju / Gimcheon Sangmu (army)	21	(2)
2021–2022	FC Seoul	5	(0)
2022–2023	Busan IPark	47	(4)
2024–2025	Seongnam FC	33	(0)
2025–	Incheon	19	(1)

International career^{‡}
2016	South Korea U23	1	(0)
- * Club domestic league appearances and goals as of 6 January 2026 ‡ National team caps and goals as of 28 July 2018

- Korean name
- Hangul: 정원진
- Hanja: 政原進
- RR: Jeong Wonjin
- MR: Chŏng Wŏnjin

Jung Won-jin (Korean: 정원진; born 10 August 1994) is a South Korean football player who plays as a forward or midfielder for Incheon in the K League 2.

== Career ==
Jung played college football for Yeungnam University.

=== Pohang Steelers ===
Jung joined Pohang Steelers in 2016 and made his professional debut against Urawa Red Diamonds in AFC Champions League on 2 March 2016. On 12 March 2016, he made his K League 1 debut against Gwangju FC.

=== Gyeongnam FC ===
On 28 December 2016, Jung joined Gyeongnam FC on loan.

=== FC Seoul ===
On 28 July 2018, Jung joined FC Seoul.

== Club career statistics ==
Club performance			League		Cup		continental		Total	
Season	Club	League	Apps	Goals	Apps	Goals	Apps	Goals	Apps	Goals
South Korea			League		KFA Cup		Asia		Total	
2016	Pohang Steelers	K League 1	11	0	0	0	1	0	12	0
2017	Gyeongnam FC	K League 2	34	10	0	0	—		34	10
2018	Pohang Steelers	K League 1	18	1	0	0	0	0	18	1
2018	FC Seoul	K League 1	1	0	0	0	0	0	1	0
2019	FC Seoul	K League 1	16	3	0	0	0	0	16	3
2020	Sangju Sangmu	K League 1	6	1	0	0	—		6	1
2021	Gimcheon Sangmu	K League 2	15	1	0	0	—		15	1
2021	FC Seoul	K League 1	2	0	0	0	0	0	2	0
Total	South Korea		103	16	0	0	1	0	104	16
Career total			103	16	0	0	1	0	104	16
