= Shin Jae-won =

South Korean footballer (born 1998)

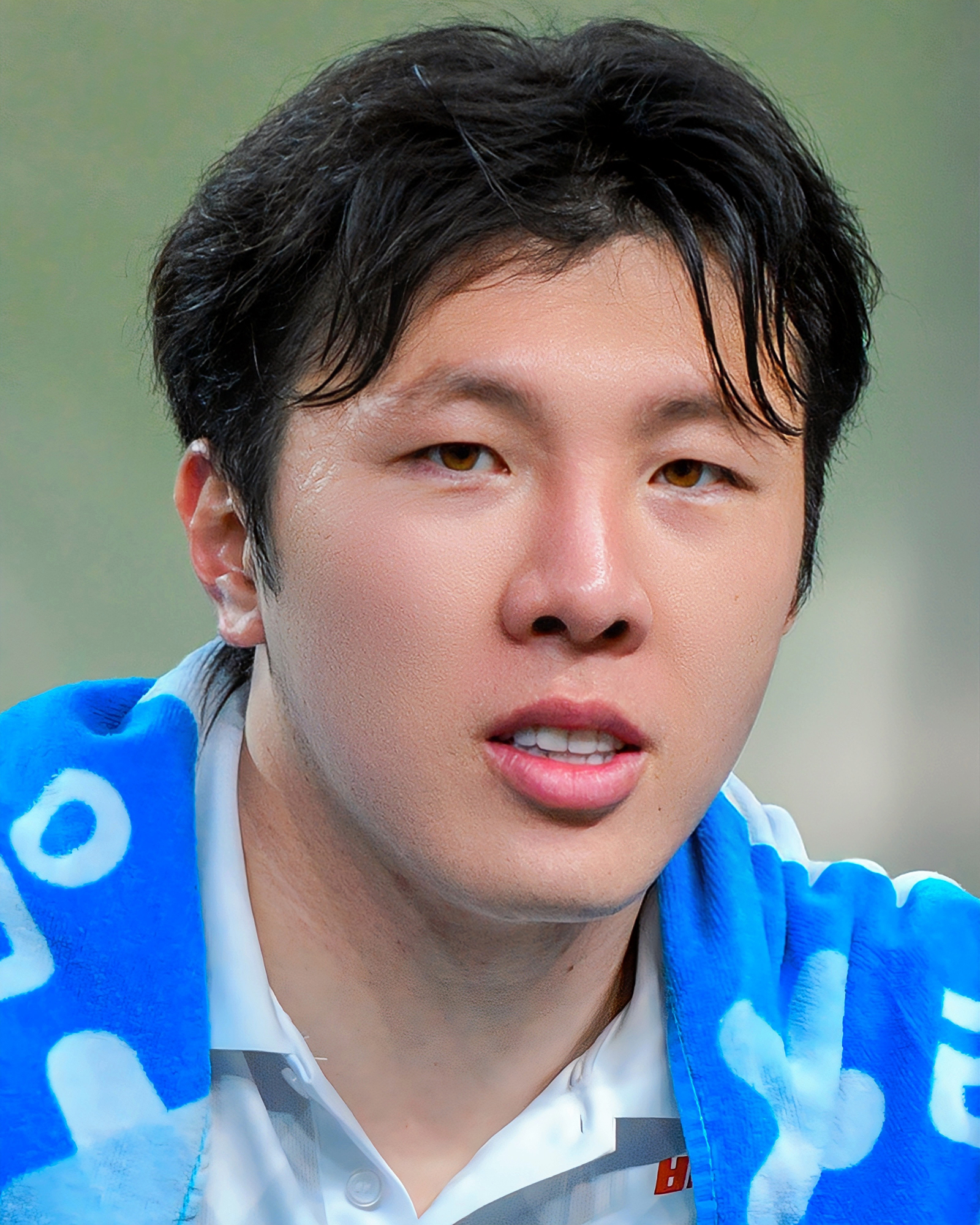
- Shin in 2026

Personal information
- Full name: Shin Jae-won
- Date of birth: 16 September 1998 (age 28)
- Place of birth: South Korea
- Height: 1.83 m (6 ft 0 in)
- Position: Midfielder

Team information
- Current team: Bucheon FC 1995
- Number: 77

Youth career
- 2015–2016: Haksung High School
- 2017–2018: Korea University

Senior career*
| Years | Team | Apps | (Gls) |
| 2019–2022 | FC Seoul | 11 | (1) |
| 2020 | → Ansan Greeners (loan) | 14 | (0) |
| 2022–2023 | Suwon FC | 7 | (0) |
| 2023–2025 | Seongnam FC | 78 | (4) |
| 2026– | Bucheon FC 1995 | 13 | (1) |

International career^{‡}
| 2014 | South Korea U17 | 4 | (0) |
Korean name
| Hangul | 신재원 |
| Hanja | 申在元 |
| RR | Sin Jaewon |
| MR | Sin Chaewŏn |
- * Club domestic league appearances and goals as of 28 May 2026 ‡ National team caps and goals as of 7 April 2019

Shin Jae-won (Korean: 신재원; born 16 September 1998) is a South Korean professional footballer who plays as a midfielder for K League 1 club Bucheon FC 1995.

== Personal life ==
He is the son of Shin Tae-yong, a prominent coach who most recently managed the Indonesia national football team.

== Honours ==
Individual

- K League 2 Best XI: 2025
