= Kim Won-gun =

South Korean footballer (born 1992)

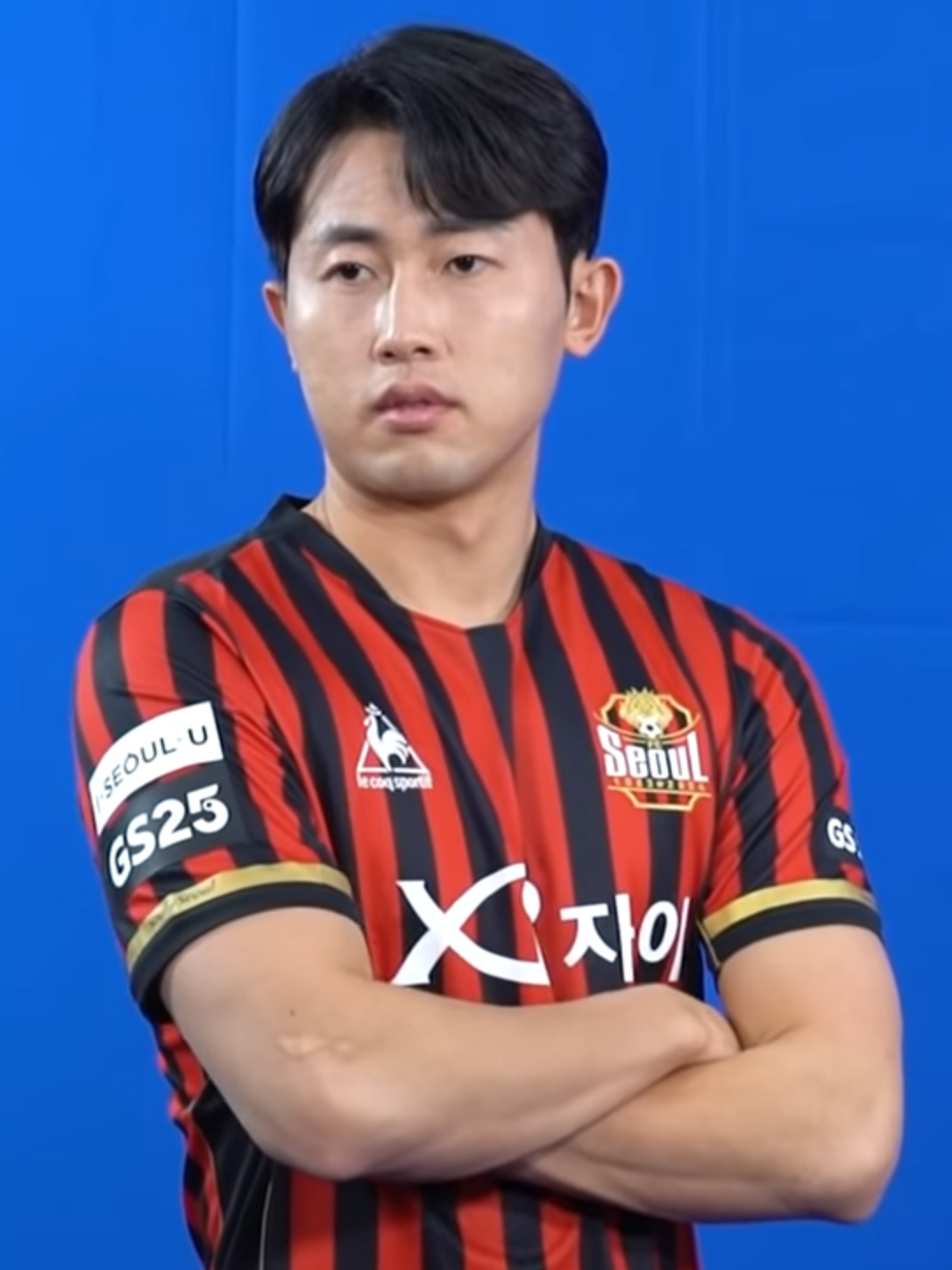
- Kim in 2021

Personal information
- Date of birth: May 1, 1992 (age 34)
- Place of birth: Jeju-do, South Korea
- Height: 1.86 m (6 ft 1 in)
- Position: Centre back

Team information
- Current team: Gimpo FC
- Number: 40

Youth career
- 2011–2014: Korea University

Senior career*
Years	Team	Apps	(Gls)
2015–2021	FC Seoul	44	(1)
2015	→ Gangwon FC (loan)	15	(0)
2016	→ Gangwon FC (loan)	8	(1)
2022	Gangwon F.C.	3	(0)
2023	Chungbuk Cheongju FC	21	(0)
2024–	Gimpo FC	2	(0)
- * Club domestic league appearances and goals as of 18 September 2022 ‡ National team caps and goals as of 15 August 2011

Kim Won-gun (Korean: 김원균; born May 1, 1992) is a South Korean footballer who plays for Gimpo FC.

Kim Won-gun joined FC Seoul in 2015 as Rookie Free Agent.

== Career statistics ==
=== Club ===
Appearances and goals by club, season and competition
Club	Season	League			KFA Cup		Asia		Playoffs		Total	
Club	Season	Division	Apps	Goals	Apps	Goals	Apps	Goals	Apps	Goals	Apps	Goals
FC Seoul	2015	K League 1	1	0	1	0	0	0	—		2	0
Gangwon FC	2015	K League 2	15	0	0	0	—		—		15	0
Gangwon FC	2016	K League 2	8	1	2	0	—		—		10	1
FC Seoul	2017	K League 1	8	0	0	0	0	0	—		8	0
FC Seoul	2018	K League 1	24	1	2	0	—		2	0	28	1
FC Seoul	2019	K League 1	11	0	1	0	—		—		12	0
FC Seoul	2020	K League 1	0	0	0	0	2	0	—		2	0
Career total			67	2	6	0	2	0	2	0	77	2
