= 2013 FC Seoul season =

FC Seoul
2013 season
- Chairman: Huh Chang-soo
- Manager: Choi Yong-soo
- K League Classic: 4th
- FA Cup: Quarter-finals
- AFC Champions League: Runners-up
- Top goalscorer: League: Dejan (27); All: Dejan (19)
- Highest home attendance: 43,681 vs Suwon (League, 3 August)
- Lowest home attendance: 1,835 vs Yonsei University (FA Cup, 8 May)
- Average home league attendance: 16,607
Home colours	Away colours

The 2013 season is FC Seoul's 30th season in the K League Classic, the highest tier of the South Korean football league system.

== Pre-season ==
- In Guam: From 7 January 2013 to 26 January 2013
- In Kagoshima, Japan: From 3 February 2013 to 17 February 2013

=== Pre-season match results ===
Type	Date	Opponents	Result	Score	Scorers	Notes
Practice matches during winter training spell in Kagoshima, Japan	5 February 2013	(Japan) Júbilo Iwata	W	1–0	(South Korea) Park Hee-Seong	
Practice matches during winter training spell in Kagoshima, Japan	5 February 2013	(Japan) Júbilo Iwata	L	0–2		
Practice matches during winter training spell in Kagoshima, Japan	8 February 2013	(Japan) Shimizu S-Pulse	D	1–1	(South Korea) Yun Il-Lok	
Practice matches during winter training spell in Kagoshima, Japan	11 February 2013	(Japan) Roasso Kumamoto	W	4–0	(South Korea) Yun Il-Lok, (Montenegro) Dejan, (South Korea) Park Hee-Seong	
Practice matches during winter training spell in Kagoshima, Japan	13 February 2013	(Japan) Urawa Red Diamonds	W	3–1	(Montenegro) Dejan, (South Korea) Ko Kwang-Min, (South Korea) Choi Hyun-Tae	
Practice matches during winter training spell in Kagoshima, Japan	15 February 2013	(Japan) Kyoto Sanga F.C.	W	1–0	(Montenegro) Dejan	
Practice matches during winter training spell in Kagoshima, Japan	16 February 2013	(Japan) Matsumoto Yamaga F.C.	L	2–3	?	

== Competitions ==
=== Overview ===
Competition	Starting round	Final position	Record							
Competition	Starting round	Final position	Pld	W	D	L	GF	GA	GD	Win %
K League Classic	Matchday 1	Matchday 38					—			
FA Cup	Round of 32						—			
AFC Champions League	Group Stage						—			
Total			0	0	0	0	0	0	+0	—

Last updated: 31 December 2013
Source: Fixtures and Results at FC Seoul Official Website

=== K League Classic ===
==== League table ====
Pos	Team	Pld	W	D	L	GF	GA	GD	Pts	Qualification or relegation
2	Ulsan Hyundai	38	22	7	9	63	37	+26	73	Qualification for Champions League (Note: Pohang Steelers won the league after qualifying for the Champions League as champions of the FA Cup. Therefore, the spot given to the league champions was passed to the fourth-placed team.)
3	Jeonbuk Hyundai Motors	38	18	9	11	61	49	+12	63	Qualification for Champions League
4	FC Seoul	38	17	11	10	59	46	+13	62	Qualification for Champions League
5	Suwon Samsung Bluewings	38	15	8	15	50	43	+7	53	
6	Busan IPark	38	14	10	14	43	41	+2	52	

Source: K League
Rules for classification: 1) Points; 2) Goal difference; 3) Goals scored

=== AFC Champions League ===
==== Group stage ====
Group E
Team	Pld	W	D	L	GF	GA	GD	Pts
(South Korea) FC Seoul	6	3	2	1	11	5	+6	11
(Thailand) Buriram United	6	1	4	1	6	6	0	7
(China) Jiangsu Sainty	6	2	1	3	5	10	−5	7
(Japan) Vegalta Sendai	6	1	3	2	5	6	−1	6

26 February 2013 1	FC Seoul (South Korea)	5–1	(China) Jiangsu Sainty	Seoul, South Korea
19:30 UTC+9	Damjanović 8', 61'; Yun Il-Lok 33', 56'; Molina 87'	Report	Salihi 80'	Stadium: Seoul World Cup Stadium; Attendance: 6,231; Referee: Mohsen Torky (Iran)

12 March 2013 2	Buriram United (Thailand)	0–0	(South Korea) FC Seoul	Buriram, Thailand
18:00 UTC+7		Report		Stadium: New I-Mobile Stadium; Attendance: 20,271; Referee: Abdul Malik Abdul Bashir (Singapore)

2 April 2013 3	FC Seoul (South Korea)	2–1	(Japan) Vegalta Sendai	Seoul, South Korea
19:30 UTC+9	Escudero 6'; Kim Jin-Kyu 22'	Report	Wilson 87' (pen.)	Stadium: Seoul World Cup Stadium; Attendance: 9,762; Referee: Valentin Kovalenko (Uzbekistan)

10 April 2013 4	Vegalta Sendai (Japan)	1–0	(South Korea) FC Seoul	Sendai, Japan
19:00 UTC+9	Yanagisawa 16'	Report		Stadium: Yurtec Stadium Sendai; Attendance: 8,874; Referee: Mohamed Al Zarouni (United Arab Emirates)

24 April 2013 5	Jiangsu Sainty (China)	0–2	(South Korea) FC Seoul	Nanjing, China PR
19:40 UTC+8		Report	Koh Myong-Jin 32'; Yun Il-Lok 72'	Stadium: Nanjing Olympic Sports Center; Attendance: 33,587; Referee: Abdul Malik Abdul Bashir (Singapore)

1 May 2013 6	FC Seoul (South Korea)	2–2	(Thailand) Buriram United	Seoul, South Korea
19:30 UTC+9	Jung Seung-Yong 55'; Kim Hyun-Sung 74'	Report	Ekkachai 56'; Theeraton 75'	Stadium: Seoul World Cup Stadium; Attendance: 7,561; Referee: Alireza Faghani (Iran)

==== Knockout stage ====
===== Round of 16 =====
14 May 2013 First leg	Beijing Guoan (China)	0–0	(South Korea) FC Seoul	Beijing, China PR
19:30 UTC+8		Report		Stadium: Workers Stadium; Attendance: 36,458; Referee: Andre El Haddad (Lebanon)

21 May 2013 Second leg	FC Seoul (South Korea)	3–1 (3–1 agg.)	(China) Beijing Guoan	Seoul, South Korea
19:30 UTC+9	Adi 60'; Yun Il-Lok 70'; Koh Myong-Jin 90+4'	Report	Kanouté 9'	Stadium: Seoul World Cup Stadium; Attendance: 14,437; Referee: Mohsen Torky (Iran)

===== Quarter-finals =====
21 August 2013 First leg	Al-Ahli (Saudi Arabia)	1–1	(South Korea) FC Seoul	Mecca, Saudi Arabia
21:00 UTC+3	Al-Sawadi 81'	Report	Damjanović 10'	Stadium: King Abdul Aziz Stadium; Attendance: 25,012; Referee: Abdullah Balideh (Qatar)

18 September 2013 Second leg	FC Seoul (South Korea)	1–0 (2–1 agg.)	(Saudi Arabia) Al-Ahli	Seoul, South Korea
19:30 UTC+9	Damjanović 90'	Report		Stadium: Seoul World Cup Stadium; Attendance: 18,094; Referee: Masaaki Toma (Japan)

===== Semi-finals =====
25 September 2013 First leg	FC Seoul (South Korea)	2–0	(Iran) Esteghlal	Seoul, South Korea
19:30 UTC+9	Damjanović 39'; Go Yo-Han 47'	Report		Stadium: Seoul World Cup Stadium; Attendance: 12,774; Referee: Ben Williams (Australia)

2 October 2013 Second leg	Esteghlal (Iran)	2–2 (2–4 agg.)	(South Korea) FC Seoul	Tehran, Iran
19:00 UTC+3:30	Omranzadeh 50'; Ghazi 75'	Report	Ha Dae-Sung 37'; Kim Jin-Kyu 80' (pen.)	Stadium: Azadi Stadium; Attendance: 88,330; Referee: Khalil Al Ghamdi (Saudi Arabia)

===== Final =====
26 October 2013 First leg	FC Seoul (South Korea)	2–2	(China) Guangzhou E.	Seoul, South Korea
19:30 UTC+9	Escudero 11'; Damjanović 83'	Report	Elkeson 30'; Gao Lin 58'	Stadium: Seoul World Cup Stadium; Attendance: 55,501; Referee: Ravshan Irmatov (Uzbekistan)

9 November 2013 Second leg	Guangzhou E. (China)	1–1 (3–3 agg.)	(South Korea) FC Seoul	Guangzhou, China PR
20:00 UTC+8	Elkeson 58'	Report	Damjanović 63'	Stadium: Tianhe Stadium; Attendance: 55,847; Referee: Nawaf Shukralla (Bahrain)

== Match reports and match highlights ==
Fixtures and Results at FC Seoul Official Website (in English)

== Season statistics ==
=== K League Classic records ===
Season	Teams	Final Position	Pld	W	D	L	GF	GA	GD	Pts	Manager
2013	14	4th	38	17	11	10	59	46	+13	62	(South Korea) Choi Yong-Soo

=== All competitions records ===
Seasoan	Teams	K League Classic	FA Cup	AFC Champions League	Manager
2013	14	4th	Quarter-finals	Runners-up	(South Korea) Choi Yong-Soo

=== Attendance records ===
Season	Season Total / Average Att.	K League Classic Total / Average Att.	FA Cup Total / Average Att.	ACL Total / Average Att.	Friendly Match Att.	Att. Ranking	Notes
2013	451,845 / 15,581	315,540 / 16,607	11,945 / 3,982	124,360 / 17,766	N/A	K League Season; Total Att. 2nd	

- Season total attendance is K League Classic, FA Cup, AFC Champions League in the aggregate and friendly match attendance is not included.

== Squad statistics ==
=== Goals ===
Pos	K League Classic	FA Cup	AFC Champions League	Total	Notes
1	(Montenegro) Dejan (19 / 29)	(South Korea) Ha Dae-Sung (1 / 1) (Colombia) Molina (1 / 1)	(Montenegro) Dejan (7 / 13)	(Montenegro) Dejan (27 / 44)	
2	(Colombia) Molina (9 / 35)	(South Korea) Kim Hyun-Sung (1 / 2) (Montenegro) Dejan (1 / 2)	(South Korea) Yun Il-Lok (4 / 10)	(Colombia) Molina (11 / 49)	
3	(South Korea) Kim Jin-Kyu (6 / 35)	(South Korea) Lee Sang-Hyeob (1 / 3) (South Korea) Han Tae-You (1 / 3)	(South Korea) Kim Jin-Kyu (2 / 11)	(South Korea) Kim Jin-Kyu (8 / 47)	
4	(South Korea) Go Yo-Han (5 / 37)	N/A	(Japan) Escudero (2 / 12)	(South Korea) Yun Il-Lok (6 / 41)	
5	(Japan) Escudero (4 / 34)	N/A	(South Korea) Koh Myong-Jin (2 / 13 )	(Japan) Escudero (6 / 49)	

=== Assists ===
Pos	K League Classic	Total	Notes
1	(Colombia) Molina (13 / 35)	(Colombia) Molina (13 / 35)	
2	(Japan) Escudero (7 / 34)	(Japan) Escudero (7 / 34)	
3	(Montenegro) Dejan (5 / 29)	(Montenegro) Dejan (5 / 29)	
4	(South Korea) Cha Du-Ri (3 / 30)	(South Korea) Cha Du-Ri (3 / 30)	
5	(South Korea) Go Yo-Han (3 / 37)	(South Korea) Go Yo-Han (3 / 37)	

== Coaching staff ==
Position	Name	Notes
Manager	(South Korea) Choi Yong-Soo	
Assistant manager	(South Korea) Lee Young-Jin	
Coach	(South Korea) Kim Seong-Jae	
Coach	(South Korea) Lee Ki-Hyung	
Goalkeeping coach	(Brazil) Leandro	
Fitness coach	(Japan) Kanno Atsushi	
Youth Team Manager	(Spain) Kike Linero	
U-18 Team Coach	(South Korea) Lee Won-Jun	
U-16 Team Coach	(South Korea) Yun Dae-Sung	
U-14 Team Coach	(South Korea) Chung Sang-Nam	
Youth Team Goalkeeping Coach	(South Korea) Seo Dong-Myung	
Youth Team Goalkeeping Coach	(North Macedonia) Gjorgji Jovanovski	
Head of Youth Development	(South Korea) Choi Soon-Ho	
Chief scout	(South Korea) Choi Gi-Bong	
Scout	(South Korea) Jung Jae-Yoon	
Scout	(South Korea) Kim Sang-Moon	

== Players ==
=== Team roster ===
All players registered for the 2013 season are listed.

Note: Flags indicate national team as defined under FIFA eligibility rules; some limited exceptions apply. Players may hold more than one non-FIFA nationality.

No.	Pos.	Nation	Player
1	GK	KOR	Kim Yong-Dae
2	DF	KOR	Choi Hyo-Jin
4	DF	KOR	Kim Ju-Young
5	DF	KOR	Cha Du-Ri (In)
6	DF	KOR	Kim Jin-Kyu (vice-captain)
7	DF	KOR	Kim Chi-Woo
8	DF	BRA	Adilson dos Santos
9	FW	JPN	Sergio Escudero
10	FW	MNE	Dejan Damjanović
11	FW	COL	Mauricio Molina
13	DF	KOR	Hyun Young-Min (Out)
14	FW	KOR	Park Hee-Seong
15	FW	KOR	Kang Jung-Hun (Out)
16	MF	KOR	Ha Dae-Sung (captain)
17	MF	KOR	Choi Hyun-Tae
18	FW	KOR	Kim Hyun-Sung
19	MF	KOR	Lee Jae-Kwon (Conscripted)
20	MF	KOR	Han Tae-You
21	MF	KOR	Go Yo-Han
22	MF	KOR	Koh Myong-Jin
23	GK	KOR	Han Il-Koo
24	MF	KOR	Yun Il-Lok

No.	Pos.	Nation	Player
26	MF	KOR	Cho Nam-Kee (Discharged)
27	MF	KOR	Ko Kwang-Min
28	DF	KOR	Kim Nam Chun
29	MF	KOR	Lee Sang-Hyeob
31	GK	KOR	Yu Sang-Hun
32	FW	KOR	Jung Seung-Yong
33	MF	KOR	Choi Tae-Uk
36	DF	KOR	Lee Taig-Ki
37	MF	KOR	Moon Dong-Ju
38	DF	KOR	Jang Hyun-Woo
41	GK	KOR	Lee Seung-Kyu
42	DF	KOR	Choi Bong-Won
43	MF	KOR	Lee Kwang-Jin (Out)
44	FW	KOR	Joo Ik-Seong
45	DF	KOR	Cho Min-Woo (Out)
46	MF	KOR	Roh Young-Gyun
47	MF	KOR	Shin Hak-Young
48	DF	KOR	Kim Sang-Pil
49	FW	KOR	Hwang Sin-Young
50	MF	KOR	Park Seung-Ryeol
51	GK	KOR	Kim Eun-Do

=== Out on loan & military service ===
Note: Flags indicate national team as defined under FIFA eligibility rules; some limited exceptions apply. Players may hold more than one non-FIFA nationality.

No.	Pos.	Nation	Player
—	MF	KOR	Kyung Jae-Yoon (to (South Korea) Busan IPark until July 2013)
—	MF	KOR	Kyung Jae-Yoon (to (South Korea) Goyang Hi FC until December 2013)
—	MF	KOR	Youn Sung-Woo (to (South Korea) Goyang Hi FC until December 2013)
—	MF	KOR	Yoon Seung-Hyeon (to (South Korea) Incheon Korail until December 2013)
—	DF	KOR	Cho Min-Woo (to (Japan) V-Varen Nagasaki until December 2013)
—	FW	KOR	Kang Jung-hun (to (South Korea) Gangwon FC until December 2013)
—	MF	KOR	Lee Kwang-jin (to (South Korea) Gwangju FC until December 2013)

No.	Pos.	Nation	Player
—	MF	KOR	Cho Nam-Kee (to (South Korea) Police FC until July 2013 / Discharged)
—	DF	KOR	Choi Won-Wook (to (South Korea) Police FC until September 2013 / Discharged^{[1]})
—	DF	KOR	Kim Dong-Woo (to (South Korea) Police FC until September 2014)
—	DF	KOR	Song Seung-Ju (to (South Korea) Police FC until September 2014)
—	MF	KOR	Moon Ki-Han (to (South Korea) Police FC until September 2014)
—	MF	KOR	Kim Won-Sik (to (South Korea) Police FC until September 2014)
—	FW	KOR	Jung Jo-Gook (to (South Korea) Police FC until September 2014)

1. Choi Won-Wook was not registered 2013 season
- In : Transferred from other teams in the middle of season.
- Out : Transferred to other teams in the middle of season.
- Discharged : Transferred from Sangju Sangmu and Police FC for military service in the middle of season. (Registered in 2013 season)
- Conscripted : Transferred to Sangju Sangmu and Police FC for military service after end of season.

== Transfers ==
=== In ===
#	Name	POS	Moving from	Mode	Window	Period	Fee	Notes
1	(South Korea) Lee Kwang-Jin	MF	(South Korea) Daegu FC	Loan Return	Winter (End of the 2012 season)	N/A	N/A	
2	(South Korea) Kim Hyun-Sung	FW	(Japan) Shimizu S-Pulse	Loan return	Winter (End of the 2012 season)		N/A	
3	(South Korea) Yun Il-Lok	FW	(South Korea) Gyeongnam FC	Transfer	Winter (2012-12-26)	Undisclosed	$930,000	
4	(Japan) Sergio Escudero	FW	(Japan) Urawa Red Diamonds	Transfer	Winter (2012-12-28)	3 years (2015-12-31)	Undisclosed	
5	(South Korea) Cha Du-Ri	DF	(Germany) Fortuna Düsseldorf	Free transfer (Contract terminated)	Winter (2013-03-25)	2 years (2014-12-31)	Free	
6	(South Korea) Cho Nam-Kee	MF	(South Korea) Police FC	Return from military service	N/A (2013-07-15)		N/A	
7	(South Korea) Choi Won-Wook	DF	(South Korea) Police FC	Return from military service	N/A (2013-09-28)		N/A	

==== Rookie Draft & Free Agent ====
#	Name	POS	Moving from	Mode	Notes
1	(South Korea) Kim Sang-Pil	DF	(South Korea) Sungkyunkwan University	Youth system (After Univ.)	FC Seoul U-18 Team (2009 Draft)
2	(South Korea) Kim Eun-Do	GK	(South Korea) Dongbuk High School	Youth system	FC Seoul U-18 Team
3	(South Korea) Park Seung-Ryeol	MF	(South Korea) Dongbuk High School	Youth system	FC Seoul U-18 Team
4	(South Korea) Shin Hak-Young	MF	(South Korea) Dongbuk High School	Youth system	FC Seoul U-18 Team
5	(South Korea) Choi Bong-Won	DF	(South Korea) Dongbuk High School	Youth system	FC Seoul U-18 Team
6	(South Korea) Hwang Sin-Young	FW	(South Korea) Dongbuk High School	Youth system	FC Seoul U-18 Team
7	(South Korea) Oh Jun-Hyeok		(South Korea) Dongbuk High School	Youth system (Univ.)	FC Seoul U-18 Team
8	(South Korea) Cho Won-Tae		(South Korea) Dongbuk High School	Youth system (Univ.)	FC Seoul U-18 Team
9	(South Korea) Park Hee-Seong	FW	(South Korea) Korea University	Regular (1st)	
10	(South Korea) Lee Sang Hyeob	FW	(South Korea) Korea University	Regular (3rd)	
11	(South Korea) Moon Dong-Ju	FW	(South Korea) Daegu University	Regular (4th)	
12	(South Korea) Roh Young-Gyun	MF	(South Korea) Boin High School	Regular (6th)	
13	(South Korea) Kim Nam-Chun	DF	(South Korea) Dongguk University	Rookie Free Agent	

- (Univ.) means player who go to university then back to FC Seoul.
- (After Univ.) means player who is joined FC Seoul after entering university.

=== Out ===
#	Name	POS	Moving to	Mode	Window	Period	Fee	Notes
1	(South Korea) Park Hee-Do	MF	(South Korea) Jeonbuk Hyundai Motors	Transfer	Winter (2013-01-07)	Undisclosed	Undisclosed	
2	(South Korea) Kim Tae-Hwan	MF	(South Korea) Seongnam Ilhwa Chunma	Transfer	Winter (2013-01-07)	Undisclosed	Undisclosed	
3	(South Korea) Lee Jong-min	DF	(South Korea) Suwon Samsung Bluewings	Transfer	Winter (2013-01-13)	3년	Undisclosed	
4	(South Korea) Jo Su-Huk	GK	(South Korea) Incheon United	Transfer	Winter (2013-01-16)	Undisclosed	Undisclosed	
5	(South Korea) Yoon Si-Ho	DF	(South Korea) Jeonnam Dragons	Free transfer (Contract terminated)	Winter (2013-01-16)	Undisclosed	Free	
6	(South Korea) Kim Yong-Chan	DF	(South Korea) Gyeongnam FC	Free transfer (Contract terminated)	Winter (2013-01-22)	Undisclosed	Free	
7	(South Korea) Hwang In-Seong	FW	Unknown	Contract terminated	Winter (2013-01-23)			
8	(South Korea) Kwak Jung-Geun	MF	Unknown	Contract terminated	Winter (2013-01-23)			
9	(South Korea) Lee Jae-Il	FW	Unknown	Contract terminated	Winter (2013-01-23)			
10	(South Korea) Jeong Dong-Yeon	DF	Unknown	Contract terminated	Winter (2013-01-23)			
11	(South Korea) Yoo Sang-Hee	DF	Unknown	Contract terminated	Winter (2013-01-23)			
12	(South Korea) Cho Ho-Yeon	MF	Unknown	Contract terminated	Winter (2013-01-23)			
13	(South Korea) Hyun Young-Min	DF	(South Korea) Seongnam Ilhwa Chunma	Transfer	Winter (2013-03-27)	Undisclosed	$88,000	

==== Loan & Military service ====
#	Name	POS	Moving to	Window	Period	Fee	Notes
1	(South Korea) Jung Jo-Gook	FW	(South Korea) Police FC	End of the 2012 season (2012-12-27)	21 months	N/A	
2	(South Korea) Kim Dong-Woo	DF	(South Korea) Police FC	End of the 2012 season (2012-12-27)	21 months	N/A	
3	(South Korea) Song Seung-Ju	DF	(South Korea) Police FC	End of the 2012 season (2012-12-27)	21 months	N/A	
4	(South Korea) Moon Ki-Han	MF	(South Korea) Police FC	End of the 2012 season (2012-12-27)	21 months	N/A	
5	(South Korea) Kim Won-Sik	MF	(South Korea) Police FC	End of the 2012 season (2012-12-27)	21 months	N/A	
6	(South Korea) Youn Sung-Woo	MF	(South Korea) Goyang Hi FC	Winter (2013-01-08)	1 year	Free	
7	(South Korea) Yoon Seung-Hyun	MF	(South Korea) Incheon Korail FC	Winter (2013-02-14)	1 year	Free	
8	(South Korea) Cho Min-Woo	DF	(Japan) V-Varen Nagasaki	Winter (2013-04-05)	1 year	Free	
9	(South Korea) Kang Jung-Hun	FW	(South Korea) Gangwon FC	Summer (2013-07-26)	6 months	Free	
10	(South Korea) Lee Kwang-Jin	MF	(South Korea) Goyang Hi FC	Summer (2013-07-31)	6 months	Free	
11	(South Korea) Kyung Jae-Yoon	MF	(South Korea) Goyang Hi FC	Summer (2013-07-31)	6 months	Free	

== Tactics ==
=== Starting eleven and formation ===
This section shows the most used players for each position considering a 4–3–3 or 4-2-3-1 formation.

No.	Pos.	Nat.	Name	MS	Notes
1	GK	(South Korea)	Kim Yong-Dae		
5	DF	(South Korea)	Cha Du-Ri		
6	DF	(South Korea)	Kim Jin-Kyu		
4	DF	(South Korea)	Kim Ju-Young		
8	DF	(Brazil)	Adilson		
21	MF	(South Korea)	Go Yo-Han		
16	MF	(South Korea)	Ha Dae-Sung		
22	MF	(South Korea)	Koh Myong-Jin		
9	MF	(Japan)	Escudero		
10	FW	(Montenegro)	Dejan		
11	MF	(Colombia)	Molina		

Source: Squad stats and Start formations.
Only competitive matches.
Using the most used start formation.
Ordered by position on pitch (from back right to front left).

=== Substitutes ===
No.	Pos.	Nat.	Name	MS	Notes
31	GK	(South Korea)	Yu Sang-Hun		
3	DF	(South Korea)	Choi Hyo-Jin		
7	DF	(South Korea)	Kim Chi-Woo		
20	MF	(South Korea)	Han Tae-You		
24	MF	(South Korea)	Yun Il-Lok		
33	MF	(South Korea)	Choi Tae-Uk		
18	FW	(South Korea)	Kim Hyun-Sung		

Source: Squad stats and Start formations.
Only competitive matches.
Using the most used start formation.
Ordered by position on pitch (from back right to front left).

== See also ==
- FC Seoul
