= 2012 FC Seoul season =

FC Seoul
2012 season
- Chairman: Huh Chang-soo
- Manager: Choi Yong-soo
- K-League: 1st
- FA Cup: Round of 16
- Top goalscorer: League: Dejan (31); All: Dejan (31)
- Highest home attendance: 50,787 vs Suwon (League, 18 August)
- Lowest home attendance: 7,278 vs Ulsan (League, 15 November)
- Average home league attendance: 20,502
Home colours	Away colours

The 2012 season is South Korean football club FC Seoul's 29th season in the K League 1.

== Pre-season ==
- In Guam: From 9 January 2012 to 27 January 2012
- In Kagoshima, Japan: From 5 February 2012 to 22 February 2012

=== Pre-season match results ===
Type	Date	Opponents	Result	Score	Scorers	Notes
Practice matches during winter training spell in Kagoshima, Japan	8 February 2012	(Japan) Júbilo Iwata	L	2–3	(South Korea) Park Hee-Do, (South Korea) Yoon Sung-Woo	
Practice matches during winter training spell in Kagoshima, Japan	8 February 2012	(Japan) Júbilo Iwata	D	1–1	(Montenegro) Dejan	
Practice matches during winter training spell in Kagoshima, Japan	11 February 2012	(Japan) Urawa Red Diamonds	W	4–1	(Montenegro) Dejan, (South Korea) Kim Joo-Young, (Colombia) Molina (2)	
Practice matches during winter training spell in Kagoshima, Japan	14 February 2012	(Japan) Vissel Kobe	L	2–3	(South Korea) Ha Dae-Sung, (South Korea) Kim Tae-Hwan	
Practice matches during winter training spell in Kagoshima, Japan	18 February 2012	(China) Hangzhou Greentown	W	5–0	(Brazil) Adilson, (South Korea) Ha Dae-Sung, (South Korea) Park Hee-Do (South Korea) Hyun Young-Min, (South Korea) Yoon Sung-Woo	
Practice matches during winter training spell in Kagoshima, Japan	21 February 2012	(Japan) FC Tokyo	L	2–3	(Colombia) Molina, (South Korea) Hyun Young-Min	

== Competitions ==
=== Overview ===
Competition	Starting round	Final position	Record							
Competition	Starting round	Final position	Pld	W	D	L	GF	GA	GD	Win %
K League	Matchday 1	Matchday 44					—			
FA Cup	Round of 32						—			
Total			0	0	0	0	0	0	+0	—

Last updated: 31 December 2012
Source: Fixtures and Results at FC Seoul Official Website

=== K League ===
==== League table ====
Pos	Team	Pld	W	D	L	GF	GA	GD	Pts	Qualification or relegation
1	FC Seoul (C)	44	29	9	6	76	42	+34	96	Qualification for the Champions League (Note: Pohang Steelers finished the league in third place after qualifying for the Champions League as winners of the FA Cup: therefore, the spot given to the third-placed team was passed to the Suwon Samsung Bluewings, the fourth-placed team.)
2	Jeonbuk Hyundai Motors	44	22	13	9	82	49	+33	79	Qualification for the Champions League
3	Pohang Steelers	44	23	8	13	72	47	+25	77	Qualification for the Champions League
4	Suwon Samsung Bluewings	44	20	13	11	61	51	+10	73	Qualification for the Champions League
5	Ulsan Hyundai	44	18	14	12	60	52	+8	68	

Source: K League
Rules for classification: 1) Points; 2) Goal difference; 3) Goals scored.
(C) Champions

==== Results summary ====
Overall								Home						Away					
Pld	W	D	L	GF	GA	GD	Pts	W	D	L	GF	GA	GD	W	D	L	GF	GA	GD
27	17	7	3	47	26	+21	58	11	2	0	30	10	+20	6	5	3	17	16	+1

==== Results by round ====
Round	1	2	3	4	5	6	7	8	9	10	11	12	13	14	15	16	17	18	19	20	21	22	23	24	25	26	27	28	29	30	31	32	33	34	35	36	37	38	39	40	41	42	43	44
Ground	A	H	H	H	A	H	A	H	A	A	H	A	A	H	H	A	H	A	H	A	A	H	A	A	H	H	A	H	A	H	A	H	A	A	H	A	A	H	H	A	H	H	A	H
Result	D	W	W	W	L	W	D	D	D	W	W	W	W	W	W	L	D	W	W	D	L	W	W	D	W	W	W	L	W	W	W	W	W	L	W	W	D	D	W	W	W	W	L	W
Position	6	5	3	1	5	3	3	4	4	4	4	3	2	1	1	1	3	2	2	2	2	2	2	2	2	2	1	2	1	1	1	1	1	1	1	1	1	1	1	1	1	1	1	1

Updated to match(es) played on 2 December 2012. Source: League Fixtures and Results
A = Away; H = Home; W = Win; D = Draw; L = Loss

==== Matches ====
Date Round	Home	Score	Away	Location

4 March 1	Daegu FC	1 – 1	FC Seoul	Suseong-gu, Daegu
15:00 UTC+9	Kang Yong 13'	Report	Ha Dae-Sung 63'	Stadium: Daegu Stadium; Attendance: 21,207; Referee: Yu Sun-Ho

10 March 2	FC Seoul	2 – 0	Jeonnam Dragons	Mapo-gu, Seoul
15:00 UTC+9	Damjanović 4'; Molina 73'	Report		Stadium: Seoul World Cup Stadium; Attendance: 18,306; Referee: Kim Seong-Ho

18 March 3	FC Seoul	2 – 0	Daejeon Citizen FC	Mapo-gu, Seoul
15:00 UTC+9	Molina 51', 78'	Report		Stadium: Seoul World Cup Stadium; Attendance: 20,622; Referee: Kim Dong-Jin

25 March 4	FC Seoul	2 – 1	Jeonbuk Hyundai Motors	Mapo-gu, Seoul
15:00 UTC+9	Ha Dae-Sung 27'; Molina 89'	Report	Lee Dong-Gook 3'	Stadium: Seoul World Cup Stadium; Attendance: 25,811; Referee: Ko Geum-Bok

1 April 5	Suwon Samsung Bluewings	2 – 0	FC Seoul	Suwon, Gyeonggi
15:00 UTC+9	Éverton 24'; Radončić 34'	Report		Stadium: Suwon World Cup Stadium; Attendance: 45,192; Referee: Lee Min-Hoo

8 April 6	FC Seoul	2 – 0	Sangju Sangmu Phoenix	Mapo-gu, Seoul
17:00 UTC+9	Damjanović 39', 87'	Report		Stadium: Seoul World Cup Stadium; Attendance: 10,099; Referee: Kim Wan-Tae

11 April 7	Busan IPark	0 – 0	FC Seoul	Yeonje-gu, Busan
15:00 UTC+9		Report		Stadium: Busan Asiad Stadium; Attendance: 3,122; Referee: Choi Myung-Yong

21 April 9	FC Seoul	1 – 1	Jeju United FC	Mapo-gu, Seoul
15:00 UTC+9	Kim Hyun-Sung 76'	Report	Santos 90+3'	Stadium: Seoul World Cup Stadium; Attendance: 8,228; Referee: Yoo Sun-Ho

25 April 8	Ulsan Hyundai FC	2 – 2	FC Seoul	Nam-gu, Ulsan
19:00	Go Seul-Ki 57'; Maranhão 77'	Report	Damjanović 9', 52'; Choi Hyun-Tae (yellow card) 31' (yellow-red card) 64'	Stadium: Ulsan Munsu Football Stadium; Attendance: 1,272; Referee: Kim Sung-Ho

29 April 10	Gangwon FC	1 – 2	FC Seoul	Gangneung, Gangwon
15:00	Bae Hyo-Sung 68'	Report	Molina 28'; Damjanović 90+4'	Stadium: Gangneung Stadium; Attendance: 5,013; Referee: Kim Jong-Hyuk

5 May 11	FC Seoul	2 – 1	Pohang Steelers	Mapo-gu, Seoul
15:00	Choi Tae-Uk (0:28); Kim Tae-Hwan 72'	Report	Asamoah 52'	Stadium: Seoul World Cup Stadium; Attendance: 45,982; Referee: Lee Min-Hu

12 May 12	Gyeongnam FC	0 – 1	FC Seoul	Changwon, Gyeongnam
17:00		Report	Damjanović 90+1'	Stadium: Changwon Football Center; Attendance: 3,193; Referee: Song Min-Seok

19 May 13	Gwangju FC	1 – 2	FC Seoul	Seo-gu, Gwangju
15:00	Lee Han-Saem 78'	Report	Damjanović 6'; Molina 30'	Stadium: Gwangju World Cup Stadium; Attendance: 6,741; Referee: Ko Keum-Bok

28 May 14	FC Seoul	3 – 1	Incheon United FC	Mapo-gu, Seoul
15:00	Molina 26'; Damjanović 36' (pen.), 89'	Report	Jeong Hyuk 73'	Stadium: Seoul World Cup Stadium; Attendance: 31,156; Referee: Choi Myung-Yong

14 June 15	FC Seoul	1 – 0	Seongnam Ilhwa Chunma	Mapo-gu, Seoul
20:00	Kim Jin-Kyu 23' (Assist by No. 30)	Report		Stadium: Seoul World Cup Stadium; Attendance: 9,276; Referee: Yoo Seon-Ho

17 June 16	Pohang Steelers	1 – 0	FC Seoul	Pohang, Gyeongbuk
17:00	Kim Dae-Ho 58'	Report		Stadium: Pohang Steel Yard; Attendance: 11,887; Referee: Lee Min-Hu

24 June 17	FC Seoul	1 – 1	Ulsan Hyundai	Mapo-gu, Seoul
19:00	Go Seul-Ki 39' (o.g.)	Report(English); Report(Korean)	Maranhão 46'	Stadium: Seoul World Cup Stadium; Attendance: 25,653; Referee: Kim Sung-Ho

28 June 18	Sangju Sangmu Phoenix	0 – 1	FC Seoul	Sangju, Gyeongbuk
19:00		Report	Go Yo-Han 38' (Assist by No. 10)	Stadium: Sangju Civic Stadium; Attendance: 4,008; Referee: Song Min-Seok

1 July 19	FC Seoul	3 – 2	Gwangju FC	Mapo-gu, Seoul
19:00	Damjanović 70', 88' (pen.); Choi Tae-Uk 72'	Report	Kim Dong-Sub 15' (pen.); Park Hyun 84'	Stadium: Seoul World Cup Stadium; Attendance: 8,361; Referee: Lee Dong-Jun

11 July 20	Jeonbuk Hyundai Motors	0 – 0	FC Seoul	Jeonju, Jeonbuk
20:00				Stadium: Jeonju World Cup Stadium

15 July 21	Incheon United	3 – 2	FC Seoul	Nam-gu, Incheon
19:00	Han Kyo-Won 45+1', 62'; Yoo Hyun (yellow card) 81'; Paulo 90+1'	Report(Kor); Report(Eng)	Kim Jin-Kyu 33'; Ha Dae-Sung 67'	Stadium: Incheon Football Stadium; Attendance: 5,154; Referee: Kim Jong-Hyeok

21 July 22	FC Seoul	6 – 0	Busan IPark	Mapo-gu, Seoul
19:00	Mauricio 5'; Koh Myong-Jin 14'; Kim Jin-Kyu 25' (pen.), 63'; Escudero 52'; Damjanović 67'			Stadium: Seoul World Cup Stadium

25 July 23	Daejon Citizen	0 – 2	FC Seoul	Yuseong-gu, Daejon
19:00		Report	Mauricio Molina 33'; Dejan Damjanović 57'	Stadium: Daejeon World Cup Stadium; Attendance: 2,860; Referee: Kim Dong-Jin

28 July 24	Jeju United	3 – 3	FC Seoul	Seogwipo, Jeju
19:00	Santos 4'; Han Yong-Su (yellow card) 8'; Han Dong-Jin (yellow card) 14'; Bae Il-Hwan 26'; Seo Dong-Hyun (yellow card) 57'; Jair 64'	Report	Molina 31'; Damjanović 40', 49'; Kim Ju-Young (yellow card) 57'	Stadium: Jeju World Cup Stadium; Attendance: 16,910; Referee: Ahn Yong-Hee

4 August 25	FC Seoul	3 – 2	Gangwon FC	Mapo-gu, Seoul
19:00	Ha Dae-Sung (yellow card) 30'; Damjanović 32'; Molina 63', 67'	Report	Wesley 8'; Jeon Jae-Ho (yellow card) 30'; Park Woo-Hyun (yellow card) 50'; Kim Jin-Hwan (yellow card) 60'; Laktionov (yellow card) 83'; Jung Sung-Min 87'	Stadium: Seoul World Cup Stadium; Attendance: 13,576; Referee: Yoo Sun-Ho

8 August 26	FC Seoul	2 – 1	Gyeongnam FC	Mapo-gu, Seoul
19:00	Kim Jin-Kyu (yellow card) 42'; Ha Dae-Sung 51'; Escudero 74'	Report	Kim In-Han 8'; Kang Seung-Jo (yellow card) 54'	Stadium: Seoul World Cup Stadium; Attendance: 7,814; Referee: Ko Hyung-Jin

11 August 27	Seongnam Ilhwa Chunma	2 – 3	FC Seoul	Seongnam, Gyeonggi
19:00	Hamill (yellow card) 3' (goal) 57'; Yoon Bit-Garam 70'; Jung San (yellow card) 81'	Report	Damjanović 13', 90+1' (yellow card) 80'; Go Yo-Han (yellow card) 45'; Ha Dae-Sung (yellow card) 83'; Molina 90'	Stadium: Tancheon Sports Complex; Attendance: 3,819; Referee: Kim Wan-Tae

18 August 28	FC Seoul	0 – 2	Suwon Samsung Bluewings	Mapo-gu, Seoul
19:00	Escudero (yellow card) 20'; Kim Dong-Woo (yellow card) 46'; Molina (yellow card) 50'	Report(Eng); Report(Kor)	Radončić 9' (pen.), 81' (yellow card) 81'; Kwak Hee-Ju (yellow card) 16'; Yang Sang-Min (yellow card) 18'; Lee Sang-ho (yellow card) 18'; Park Hyun-Beom (yellow card) 32'; Bosnar (yellow card) 50'; Choi Jae-Soo (yellow card) 85'; Yang Dong-Won (yellow card) 90+4'	Stadium: Seoul World Cup Stadium; Attendance: 50,787; Referee: Kim Sung-Ho

22 August 29	Jeonnam Dragons	0 – 3	FC Seoul	Gwangyang, Jeonnam
19:30			Escudero 12'; Damjanovic 27' 58'	Stadium: Gwangyang Football Stadium

26 August 30	FC Seoul	–	Daegu FC	Mapo-gu, Seoul
19:00				Stadium: Seoul World Cup Stadium

=== FA Cup ===
23 May Round of 32	FC Seoul	3 – 0	Mokpo City Government	Mapo-gu, Seoul
19:30 KST	Molina 62' (Assist by No. 10); Ha Dae-Sung 83'; Kim Hyun-Sung 84' (Assist by No. 10)			Stadium: Seoul World Cup Stadium; Attendance: 1,751; Referee: Lee Cheon-Su

20 June Round of 16	FC Seoul	0 – 2	Suwon Samsung Bluewings	Mapo-gu, Seoul
19:30 KST	Kim Jin-Kyu (yellow card) 2' (red card) 90+4'		Kim Ju-Young 40' (o.g.); Ristić 53'	Stadium: Seoul World Cup Stadium; Attendance: 14,853; Referee: Yoo Seon-Ho

== Match reports and match highlights ==
Fixtures and Results at FC Seoul Official Website (in English)

== Season statistics ==
=== K League records ===
Season	Teams	Final Position	Pld	W	D	L	GF	GA	GD	Pts	Manager
2012	16	Champions	44	29	9	6	76	42	+34	96	(South Korea) Choi Yong-Soo

=== All competitions records ===
Seasoan	Teams	K League	FA Cup	AFC Champions League	Manager
2012	16	Champions	Round of 16	Did not qualify	(South Korea) Choi Yong-Soo

=== Attendance records ===
Season	Season Total / Average Att.	K League Total / Average Att.	FA Cup Total / Average Att.	ACL Total / Average Att.	Friendly Match Att.	Att. Ranking	Notes
2012	467,649 / 19,485	451,045 / 20,502	16,604 / 8,302	N/A	N/A	K League Season; Total Att. 1st	

- Season total attendance is K League, FA Cup, AFC Champions League in the aggregate and friendly match attendance is not included.

== Squad statistics ==
=== Appearances ===
Statistics accurate as of match played 28 June 2012

No.	Nat.	Pos.	Name	K League		FA Cup		Appearances		Goals
No.	Nat.	Pos.	Name	Apps	Goals	Apps	Goals	App (sub)	Total	Goals
1	(South Korea)	GK	Kim Yong-Dae	18	0	1	0	19 (0)	19	0
2	(South Korea)	DF	Yoon Si-Ho	0	0	0	0	0	0	0
3	(South Korea)	DF	Kim Dong-Woo	10 (2)	0	1	0	11 (2)	13	0
4	(South Korea)	DF	Kim Ju-Young	8 (3)	0	1	0	9 (3)	12	0
5	(South Korea)	MF	Choi Hyun-Tae	16 (1)	0	2	0	18 (1)	19	0
6	(South Korea)	DF	Kim Jin-Kyu	18	1	2	0	20 (0)	20	1
7	(South Korea)	DF	Go Yo-Han	14	1	2	0	16 (0)	16	1
8	(Brazil)	DF	Adilson dos Santos	14	0	1	0	15 (0)	15	0
9	(South Korea)	FW	Kang Jung-Hun	0	0	0	0	0	0	0
10	(Montenegro)	FW	Dejan Damjanović	18	10	1 (1)	0	19 (1)	20	10
11	(Colombia)	FW	Mauricio Molina	17	8	2	1	19 (0)	19	9
13	(South Korea)	DF	Hyun Young-Min	9 (1)	0	1	0	10 (1)	11	0
14	(South Korea)	MF	Moon Ki-Han	0 (1)	0	0	0	0 (1)	1	0
16	(South Korea)	MF	Ha Dae-Sung	17	1	2	1	19 (0)	19	2
17	(South Korea)	DF	Lee Jung-Youl	0	0	0	0	0	0	0
18	(South Korea)	FW	Kim Hyun-Sung	2 (10)	1	1 (1)	1	3 (11)	14	2
19	(South Korea)	MF	Lee Jae-Kwon	2 (2)	0	0 (1)	0	2 (3)	5	0
20	(South Korea)	MF	Han Tae-You	2 (5)	0	0	0	2 (5)	7	0
21	(South Korea)	GK	Jo Su-Huk	0	0	0	0	0	0	0
22	(South Korea)	MF	Koh Myong-Jin	15 (1)	0	1	0	16 (1)	17	0
23	(South Korea)	GK	Han Il-Koo	0	0	1	0	1 (0)	1	0
24	(South Korea)	GK	Yu Sang-Hun	0	0	0	0	0	0	0
27	(South Korea)	MF	Ko Kwang-Min	1 (4)	0	0	0	1 (4)	5	0
29	(South Korea)	MF	Kim Tae-Hwan	6 (11)	1	1 (1)	0	7 (12)	19	1
30	(South Korea)	MF	Park Hee-Do	4 (3)	0	1 (1)	0	5 (4)	9	0
31	(South Korea)	GK	Lee Seung-Kyu	0	0	0	0	0	0	0
32	(South Korea)	FW	Jung Seung-Yong	0	0	0	0	0	0	0
33	(South Korea)	MF	Choi Tae-Uk	7 (3)	1	1	0	8 (3)	11	1
34	(South Korea)	MF	Yoon Seung-Hyeon	0 (1)	0	0	0	0 (1)	1	0
35	(South Korea)	DF	Kim Yong-Chan	0	0	0	0	0	0	0
36	(South Korea)	DF	Lee Taig-Ki	0	0	0	0	0	0	0
37	(South Korea)	MF	Kim Won-Sik	0	0	0	0	0	0	0
38	(South Korea)	DF	Jang Hyun-Woo	0	0	0	0	0	0	0
39	(South Korea)	MF	Song Seung-Ju	0	0	0	0	0	0	0
40	(South Korea)	MF	Yoon Sung-Woo	0	0	0	0	0	0	0
41	(South Korea)	FW	Hwang In-Sung	0	0	0	0	0	0	0
42	(South Korea)	MF	Kwak Joong-Geun	0	0	0	0	0	0	0
43	(South Korea)	MF	Cho Ho-Yeon	0	0	0	0	0	0	0
44	(South Korea)	FW	Ju Ik-Sung	0	0	0	0	0	0	0
45	(South Korea)	DF	Cho Min-Woo	0	0	0	0	0	0	0
46	(South Korea)	FW	Lee Jae-Il	0	0	0	0	0	0	0
47	(South Korea)	DF	Jung Dong-Yeon	0	0	0	0	0	0	0
48	(South Korea)	DF	Yoo Sang-Hee	0	0	0	0	0	0	0

=== Goals and assists ===
Rank	Nation	Number	Name	K League		FA Cup		Sum		Total
Rank	Nation	Number	Name	Goals	Assists	Goals	Assists	Goals	Assists	Total
1	(Colombia)	11	Mauricio Molina	8	8	1	0	9	8	17
2	(Montenegro)	10	Dejan Damjanović	10	2	0	2	10	4	14
3	(South Korea)	16	Ha Dae-Sung	1	3	1	0	2	3	5
4	(South Korea)	18	Kim Hyun-Sung	1	0	1	0	2	0	2
=	(South Korea)	6	Kim Jin-Kyu	1	1	0	0	1	1	2
=	(South Korea)	7	Go Yo-Han	1	1	0	0	1	1	2
=	(South Korea)	22	Koh Myong-Jin	0	2	0	0	0	2	2
5	(South Korea)	29	Kim Tae-Hwan	1	0	0	0	1	0	1
=	(South Korea)	33	Choi Tae-Uk	1	0	0	0	1	0	1
=	(South Korea)	30	Park Hee-Do	0	1	0	0	0	1	1
/	/	/	Own Goals	1	-	0	-	1	-	1
/	/	/	TOTALS	25	18	3	2	28	20	

=== Discipline ===
Position	Nation	Number	Name	K League		FA Cup		Total	
Position	Nation	Number	Name	Yellow card	Red card	Yellow card	Red card	Yellow card	Red card
1	(South Korea)	GK	Kim Yong-Dae	1	0	0	0	1	0
4	(South Korea)	DF	Kim Ju-Young	1	0	0	0	1	0
5	(South Korea)	MF	Choi Hyun-Tae	4	1	0	0	4	1
6	(South Korea)	DF	Kim Jin-Kyu	2	0	1	1	3	1
7	(South Korea)	DF	Go Yo-Han	3	0	1	0	4	0
8	(Brazil)	DF	Adilson dos Santos	2	0	0	0	2	0
10	(Montenegro)	FW	Dejan Damjanović	2	0	1	0	3	0
11	(Colombia)	FW	Mauricio Molina	3	0	0	0	3	0
16	(South Korea)	MF	Ha Dae-Sung	1	0	1	0	2	0
18	(South Korea)	FW	Kim Hyun-Sung	1	0	0	0	1	0
19	(South Korea)	MF	Lee Jae-Kwon	1	0	0	0	1	0
20	(South Korea)	MF	Han Tae-You	1	0	0	0	1	0
22	(South Korea)	MF	Koh Myong-Jin	0	0	1	0	1	0
29	(South Korea)	MF	Kim Tae-Hwan	3	0	0	0	3	0
30	(South Korea)	MF	Park Hee-Do	2	0	0	0	2	0
/	/	/	TOTALS	27	1	5	1	32	2

== Coaching staff ==
Position	Name	Period	Notes
Manager	(South Korea) Choi Yong-Soo		
Assistant manager	(South Korea) Park Tae-Ha		
First-team coach	(South Korea) Kim Seong-Jae		
Reserve Team Manager	(South Korea) Kim Sung-Nam	–2012/08/??	
Reserve Team Coach	(South Korea) Lee Ki-Hyung		
Goalkeeping coach	(Brazil) Leandro		
Fitness coach	(Japan) Kanno Atsushi		
U-18 Team Manager	(South Korea) Lee Young-Ik		
U-18 Team Coach	(South Korea) Chang Myong-Jin		
U-18 Team Goalkeeping Coach	(South Korea) Weon Jong-teok		
Head of Youth Development	(South Korea) Choi Soon-Ho		
Technical director	(South Korea) Choi Gi-Bong	–2012/11/??	
Chief scout	(South Korea) Choi Gi-Bong	2012/11/??–	
Scout	(South Korea) Lee Won-Jun	–2012/11/??	
Scout	(South Korea) Jung Jae-Yoon	2012/04/20–	
Scout	(South Korea) Kim Sang-Moon	2012/11/??–	

== Players ==
=== Team squad ===
All players registered for the 2012 season are listed.

Note: Flags indicate national team as defined under FIFA eligibility rules; some limited exceptions apply. Players may hold more than one non-FIFA nationality.

No.	Pos.	Nation	Player
1	GK	KOR	Kim Yong-Dae
2	DF	KOR	Yoon Si-Ho
3	DF	KOR	Kim Dong-Woo (Conscripted)
4	DF	KOR	Kim Ju-Young
5	MF	KOR	Choi Hyun-Tae
6	DF	KOR	Kim Jin-Kyu (vice-captain)
7	DF	KOR	Go Yo-Han
8	DF	BRA	Adilson dos Santos
9	FW	KOR	Jung Jo-Gook (In & Conscripted)
10	FW	MNE	Dejan Damjanović
11	FW	COL	Mauricio Molina
13	DF	KOR	Hyun Young-Min
14	MF	KOR	Moon Ki-Han (Conscripted)
15	FW	KOR	Kang Jung-Hun
16	MF	KOR	Ha Dae-Sung (captain)
17	DF	KOR	Lee Jung-Youl (Out)
18	FW	KOR	Kim Hyun-Sung (Out)
17	DF	KOR	Lee Jong-min (Discharged)
18	DF	KOR	Kim Chi-Woo (Discharged)
19	MF	KOR	Lee Jae-Kwon
20	MF	KOR	Han Tae-You
21	GK	KOR	Jo Su-Huk
22	MF	KOR	Koh Myong-Jin
23	GK	KOR	Han Il-Koo

No.	Pos.	Nation	Player
24	GK	KOR	Yu Sang-Hun
26	FW	JPN	Sergio Escudero (In)
27	MF	KOR	Ko Kwang-Min
29	MF	KOR	Kim Tae-Hwan
30	MF	KOR	Park Hee-Do
31	GK	KOR	Lee Seung-Kyu
32	FW	KOR	Jung Seung-Yong
33	MF	KOR	Choi Tae-Uk
34	MF	KOR	Yoon Seung-Hyeon (Out)
35	DF	KOR	Kim Yong-Chan
36	DF	KOR	Lee Taig-Ki
37	MF	KOR	Kim Won-Sik (Conscripted)
38	DF	KOR	Jang Hyun-Woo
39	DF	KOR	Song Seung-Ju (Conscripted)
40	MF	KOR	Youn Sung-Woo
41	FW	KOR	Hwang In-Seong
42	MF	KOR	Kwak Jung-Geun
43	MF	KOR	Cho Ho-Yeon
44	FW	KOR	Joo Ik-Seong
45	DF	KOR	Cho Min-Woo
46	FW	KOR	Lee Jae-Il
47	DF	KOR	Jeong Dong-Yeon
48	DF	KOR	Yoo Sang-Hee
77	DF	KOR	Choi Hyo-Jin (Discharged)

=== Out on loan & military service ===
Note: Flags indicate national team as defined under FIFA eligibility rules; some limited exceptions apply. Players may hold more than one non-FIFA nationality.

No.	Pos.	Nation	Player
—	MF	KOR	Lee Kwang-Jin (to (South Korea) Daegu FC until December 2012)
—	MF	KOR	Kyung Jae-Yoon (to (South Korea) Busan IPark until December 2012)
—	MF	KOR	Yoon Seung-Hyeon (to (South Korea) Seongnam Ilhwa Chunma until December 2012)
—	FW	KOR	Kim Hyun-Sung (to (Japan) Shimizu S-Pulse until December 2012)

No.	Pos.	Nation	Player
—	DF	KOR	Choi Hyo-Jin (to (South Korea) Sangju Sangmu until September 2012 / Discharged)
—	DF	KOR	Lee Jong-Min (to (South Korea) Sangju Sangmu until September 2012 / Discharged)
—	MF	KOR	Kim Chi-Woo (to (South Korea) Sangju Sangmu until September 2012 / Discharged)
—	DF	KOR	Choi Won-Wook (to (South Korea) Police FC until September 2013)
—	MF	KOR	Cho Nam-Kee (to (South Korea) Police FC until September 2013)

- In : Transferred from other teams in the middle of season.
- Out : Transferred to other teams in the middle of season.
- Discharged : Transferred from Sangju Sangmu and Police FC for military service in the middle of season. (Registered in 2012 season)
- Conscripted : Transferred to Sangju Sangmu and Police FC for military service after end of season.

== Transfers ==
=== In ===
#	Name	POS	Moving from	Mode	Window	Period	Fee	Notes
1	(South Korea) Kim Hyun-Sung	FW	(South Korea) Daegu FC	Loan return	Winter (End of the 2011 season)		N/A	
2	(South Korea) Jung Seung-Yong	FW	(South Korea) Gyeongnam FC	Loan return	Winter (End of the 2011 season)		N/A	
3	(South Korea) Park Hee-Do	MF	(South Korea) Busan IPark	Transfer	Winter (2011-11-21)	Undisclosed	Trade	Bang Seung-Hwan and Yeo Hyo-Jin ↔ Park Hee-Do
4	(South Korea) Kim Jin-Kyu	DF	(Japan) Ventforet Kofu	Transfer	Winter (2012-01-19)	Free transfer (Contract terminated)	Free	
5	(South Korea) Kim Ju-Young	DF	(South Korea) Gyeongnam FC	Transfer	Winter (2012-01-20)	Undisclosed	US$792,000	Cash+Player (US$616,000+Lee Jae-An↔Kim Ju-Young)
6	(South Korea) Lee Jae-Kwon	MF	(South Korea) Incheon United	Transfer	Winter (2012-02-01)	Undisclosed	Trade	Lee Kyu-Ro↔Lee Jae-Kwon
7	(South Korea) Yoon Si-Ho	DF	(South Korea) Daegu FC	Free transfer (Contract terminated)	Winter (2012-02-02)	1 year	Free	
8	(South Korea) Lee Jae-Il	FW	(South Korea) Gyeongnam FC	Free transfer (Contract terminated)	Winter (2012-02-02)	Undisclosed	Free	
9	(South Korea) Jung Jo-Gook	FW	(France) AJ Auxerre	Free transfer (Contract terminated)	Summer (2012-07-06)	1 year	Free	
10	(Japan) Sergio Escudero	FW	(Japan) Urawa Red Diamonds	Loan	Summer (2012-07-17)	6 months (2012-12-31)	Undisclosed	
11	(South Korea) Choi Hyo-Jin	DF	(South Korea) Sangju Sangmu	Return from military service	N/A (2012-09-10)		N/A	
12	(South Korea) Lee Jong-min	DF	(South Korea) Sangju Sangmu	Return from military service	N/A (2012-09-10)		N/A	
13	(South Korea) Kim Chi-Woo	MF	(South Korea) Sangju Sangmu	Return from military service	N/A (2012-09-10)		N/A	

==== Rookie Draft ====
#	Name	POS	Moving from	Mode	Notes
1	(South Korea) Cho Min-Woo	DF	(South Korea) Dongguk University	Youth system (After Univ.)	FC Seoul U-18 Team (2010 Draft)
2	(South Korea) Kim Won-Sik	MF	(South Korea) Dongbuk High School	Youth system	FC Seoul U-18 Team; After overseas training program, He joined.
3	(South Korea) Jang Hyun-Woo	DF	(South Korea) Dongbuk High School	Youth system	FC Seoul U-18 Team
4	(South Korea) Joo Hyung-jun	MF	(South Korea) Dongbuk High School	Youth system (Univ.)	FC Seoul U-18 Team
5	(South Korea) Baek Cheol-Seung	MF	(South Korea) Dongbuk High School	Youth system (Univ.)	FC Seoul U-18 Team
6	(South Korea) Kim Hak-Seung	MF	(South Korea) Dongbuk High School	Youth system (Univ.)	FC Seoul U-18 Team
7	(South Korea) Choi Myeong-Hun	MF	(South Korea) Dongbuk High School	Youth system (Univ.)	FC Seoul U-18 Team
8	(South Korea) Park Jun-Gyeong	MF	(South Korea) Dongbuk High School	Youth system (Univ.)	FC Seoul U-18 Team
9	(South Korea) Youn Sung-woo	FW	(South Korea) Sangji University	Regular (1st)	
10	(South Korea) Lee Taig-Ki	DF	(South Korea) Ajou University	Regular (2nd)	
11	(South Korea) Kim Yong-Chan	DF	(South Korea) Ajou University	Regular (3rd)	
12	(South Korea) Joo Ik-Seong	MF	(South Korea) Taekwang High School	Extra	
13	(South Korea) Yoo Sang-Hee	MF	(South Korea) Korea University	Extra	
14	(South Korea) Kwak Jung-Geun	FW	(South Korea) Yong In University	Extra	
15	(South Korea) Lee Seung-Kyu	GK	(South Korea) Sun Moon University	Extra	
16	(South Korea) Cho Ho-Yeon	MF	(South Korea) Kwangwoon University	Extra	
17	(South Korea) Hwang In-Seong	FW	(South Korea) Yewon Arts University	Supplement	
18	(South Korea) Jeong Dong-Yeon	DF	(South Korea) Hanyang University	Supplement	

- (Univ.) means player who go to university then back to FC Seoul.
- (After Univ.) means player who is joined FC Seoul after entering university.

=== Out ===
#	Name	POS	Moving to	Mode	Window	Period	Fee	Notes
1	(South Korea) Lee Hyun-Seung	MF	(South Korea) Jeonnam Dragons	Transfer	Winter (2012–01-03)	Undisclosed	Undisclosed	Loan finish
2	(South Korea) Choi Hyun-Bin	DF		Contract terminated	Winter (2012-01-05)			Loan finish
3	(South Korea) Bang Seung-Hwan	FW	(South Korea) Busan IPark	Transfer	Winter (2011–11-21)		Trade	Bang Seung-Hwan and Yeo Hyo-Jin ↔ Park Hee-Do
4	(South Korea) Yeo Hyo-Jin	DF	(South Korea) Busan IPark	Transfer	Winter (2011–11-21)		Trade	Bang Seung-Hwan and Yeo Hyo-Jin ↔ Park Hee-Do
5	(South Korea) Lee Dong-Nyck	DF		Contract terminated	Winter (2012-01-05)			
6	(South Korea) Bae Hae-Min	FW	(South Korea) Daejeon Korea Hydro & Nuclear Power	Free transfer (Contract terminated)	Winter (2012-01-05)	Undisclosed	Free	
7	(South Korea) Oh Byoung-Min	DF		Contract expired	Winter (2012-01-05)			
8	(South Korea) Lee Han-Wool	MF		Contract expired	Winter (2012-01-05)			
9	(South Korea) Kim Dong-Hyo	FW		Contract expired	Winter (2012-01-05)			
10	(South Korea) Kim Ki-Baek	DF		Contract expired	Winter (2012-01-11)			
11	(South Korea) Choi Jong-Hoan	MF	(South Korea) Incheon United	Free transfer (Contract terminated)	Winter (2012-01-12)	Undisclosed	Free	
12	(South Korea) Lee Jae-An	FW	(South Korea) Gyeongnam FC	Transfer	Winter (2012-01-19)	Undisclosed	Kim Ju-Young–US$616,000	Cash+Player (US$616,000+Lee Jae-An↔Kim Ju-Young)
13	(South Korea) Park Yong-Ho	DF	(South Korea) Busan IPark	Transfer	Winter (2012-01-31)	1 year	Undisclosed	
14	(South Korea) Lee Kyu-Ro	DF	(South Korea) Incheon United	Transfer	Winter (2012-02-01)	Undisclosed	Trade	Lee Kyu-Ro↔Lee Jae-Kwon
15	(South Korea) Lee Seung-Yeoul	FW	(Japan) Gamba Osaka	Transfer	Winter (2012-02-01)	Undisclosed	US$1,950,000	
16	(South Korea) Ou Kyoung-Jun	MF		Contract terminated	Winter (2012-02-01)			
17	(South Korea) Chun Je-Hun	MF		Contract terminated	Winter (2012-02-01)			
18	(South Korea) Kim Dong-Jin	DF	(China) Hangzhou Greentown	Free transfer (Contract terminated)	Winter (2012-02-09)	Undisclosed	Free	
19	(South Korea) Lee Jung-Youl	DF	(South Korea) Daejeon Citizen	Free transfer (Contract terminated)	Summer (2012-07-31)	Undisclosed	Free	

==== Loan & Military service ====
#	Name	POS	Moving to	Window	Period	Fee	Notes
1	(South Korea) Choi Won-Wook	DF	(South Korea) Police FC	End of the 2011 season (2011-12-06)	21 months	N/A	
2	(South Korea) Cho Nam-Kee	MF	(South Korea) Police FC	End of the 2011 season (2011-12-06)	21 months	N/A	
3	(South Korea) Lee Kwang-Jin	MF	(South Korea) Daegu FC	Winter (2012-01-01)	1 year 6 months	Free	
4	(South Korea) Kyung Jae-Yoon	MF	(South Korea) Busan IPark	Winter (2012-01-31)	2 years	Free	
5	(South Korea) Yoon Seung-Hyeon	MF	(South Korea) Seongnam Ilhwa Chunma	Summer (2012-07-31)	6 months	Free	
6	(South Korea) Kim Hyun-Sung	FW	(Japan) Shimizu S-Pulse	Summer (2012-08-14)	5 months	Undisclosed	

== See also ==
- FC Seoul
