= 2013 AFC Champions League final =

- Event: 2013 AFC Champions League
FC Seoul	Guangzhou Evergrande
(South Korea)	(China)
3	3
- on aggregate Guangzhou Evergrande won on away goals

First leg
FC Seoul	Guangzhou Evergrande
2	2
- Date: 26 October 2013
- Venue: Seoul World Cup Stadium, Seoul
- AFC Man of the Match: Dejan Damjanović
- Fans' Man of the Match: Sergio Escudero
- Referee: Ravshan Irmatov (Uzbekistan)
- Attendance: 55,501
- Weather: Clear; 9 °C (48 °F); 66% humidity

Second leg
Guangzhou Evergrande	FC Seoul
1	1
- Date: 9 November 2013
- Venue: Tianhe Stadium, Guangzhou
- AFC Man of the Match: Darío Conca
- Fans' Man of the Match: Zheng Zhi
- Referee: Nawaf Shukralla (Bahrain)
- Attendance: 55,847
- Weather: Cloudy; 26 °C (79 °F); 69% humidity

The 2013 AFC Champions League final was the final match of the 2013 AFC Champions League, the thirty-second round of the top grade Asian club football tournament. It was organized by the Asian Football Confederation (AFC). It was the eleventh round under the title of AFC Champions League.

The final match was contested in a two-legged home-and-away format between FC Seoul of South Korea and Guangzhou Evergrande of China. The first leg was hosted by FC Seoul at the Seoul World Cup Stadium in Seoul on 26 October 2013, while the second leg was hosted by Guangzhou Evergrande at the Tianhe Stadium in Guangzhou on 9 November 2013. The winner earned the right to represent the AFC at the 2013 FIFA Club World Cup in Morocco, beginning at the quarterfinal stage.

== Qualified teams ==
Team	Previous finals appearances (bold indicates winners)
(South Korea) FC Seoul	2002
(China) Guangzhou Evergrande	None

== Outcome ==
The first leg ended with a 2-all draw. Goals were scored by Sergio Escudero and Dejan Damjanović for FC Seoul, and Elkeson and Gao Lin for Guangzhou Evergrande. The second leg ended with a 1-all draw. Goals in this game were made by Elkeson for Guangzhou Evergrande, and Dejan Damjanović for FC Seoul.

Guangzhou Evergrande won the match and was awarded the premiership. This was their first premiership win on the away goals rule.

== Venues ==
After the 2012 AFC Champions League Final took place at the home of one of the finalists, the Asian Football Confederation (AFC) announced that the following year's competition final would be contested in a two-legged home-and-away format. It was the first time since 2008 that the AFC had adopted such an arrangement.

FC Seoul's home venue, the Seoul World Cup Stadium, Seoul, is a 66,806 seated stadium located in the capital city. It is also the home ground of the Korea Republic national football team, and was the opening venue of the 2002 FIFA World Cup. It is the third largest soccer stadium in Asia, after Azadi Stadium and Salt Lake Stadium.

Guangzhou Evergrande's home venue, Tianhe Stadium, is a 58,500 seated stadium located in the city of Guangzhou. It hosted the 1991 FIFA Women's World Cup and the football matches of the 2010 Asian Games.

In the history of the competition, five finals have been held in South Korea, but this was the first one in Seoul.

== Background ==
Neither FC Seoul nor Guangzhou Everard had won the AFC club premiership before. The predecessors of FC Seoul, the Anyang LG Cheetahs, finished as runners-up of the 2001–02 Asian Club Championship. It was also the sixteenth time a Korean club had reached the final and the fourth time a Chinese club had done so.

Choi Yong-Soo was the manager of an experienced Korean side. The Korean side had won the AFC Champions League premiership four times in the previous five years. FC Seoul had represented Korea in the final games for five consecutive seasons. They had been defeated in the quarter-finals in 2009 and 2011.

Guanghzhou's head coach from May 2012 was Marcello Lippi. Lippi had won the UEFA Champions League with Juventus in 1996 and the 2006 FIFA World Cup with the Italy national football team. Guangzhou won the Chinese Super League premiership in 2010 and 2011 and had reached the quarter-finals of the 2012 AFC Champions League. Guangzhou, like FC Seoul, had lost just once en route to the final, having scored 14 goals in their last four games. Choi had the full Italian squad at his disposal. The last time China had won the premiership was in 1990 with the Liaoning team. In 1998, Dalian Wanda had lost the premiership to the Pohang Steelers.

== Road to final ==
Note: In all results below, the score of the finalist is given first.

(South Korea) FC Seoul				Round	(China) Guangzhou Evergrande			
Bye				Qualifying play-off	Bye			
Opponent	Result			Group stage	Opponent	Result		
(China) Jiangsu Sainty	5–1 (H)			Matchday 1	(Japan) Urawa Red Diamonds	3–0 (H)		
(Thailand) Buriram United	0–0 (A)			Matchday 2	(South Korea) Jeonbuk Hyundai Motors	1–1 (A)		
(Japan) Vegalta Sendai	2–1 (H)			Matchday 3	(Thailand) Muangthong United	4–0 (H)		
(Japan) Vegalta Sendai	0–1 (A)			Matchday 4	(Thailand) Muangthong United	4–1 (A)		
(China) Jiangsu Sainty	2–0 (A)			Matchday 5	(Japan) Urawa Red Diamonds	2–3 (A)		
(Thailand) Buriram United	2–2 (H)			Matchday 6	(South Korea) Jeonbuk Hyundai Motors	0–0 (H)		
**Group E winner**: Pos / Team / Pld / W / D / L / GF / GA / GD / Pts / Qualification; 1 / (South Korea) FC Seoul / 6 / 3 / 2 / 1 / 11 / 5 / +6 / **11** / Advance to knockout stage; 2 / (Thailand) Buriram United / 6 / 1 / 4 / 1 / 6 / 6 / 0 / **7** / Advance to knockout stage; 3 / (China) Jiangsu Sainty / 6 / 2 / 1 / 3 / 5 / 10 / −5 / **7**; 4 / (Japan) Vegalta Sendai / 6 / 1 / 3 / 2 / 5 / 6 / −1 / **6**; Source:				Final standings	**Group F winner**: Pos / Team / Pld / W / D / L / GF / GA / GD / Pts / Qualification; 1 / (China) Guangzhou Evergrande / 6 / 3 / 2 / 1 / 14 / 5 / +9 / **11** / Advance to knockout stage; 2 / (South Korea) Jeonbuk Hyundai Motors / 6 / 2 / 4 / 0 / 10 / 6 / +4 / **10** / Advance to knockout stage; 3 / (Japan) Urawa Red Diamonds / 6 / 3 / 1 / 2 / 11 / 11 / 0 / **10**; 4 / (Thailand) Muangthong United / 6 / 0 / 1 / 5 / 4 / 17 / −13 / **1**; Source:			
Opponent	Agg.	1st leg	2nd leg	Knock-out stage	Opponent	Agg.	1st leg	2nd leg
(China) Beijing Guoan	3–1	0–0 (A)	3–1 (H)	Round of 16	(Australia) Central Coast Mariners	5–1	2–1 (A)	3–0 (H)
(Saudi Arabia) Al-Ahli	2–1	1–1 (A)	1–0 (H)	Quarterfinals	(Qatar) Lekhwiya	6–1	2–0 (H)	4–1 (A)
(Iran) Esteghlal	4–2	2–0 (H)	2–2 (A)	Semifinals	(Japan) Kashiwa Reysol	8–1	4–1 (A)	4–0 (H)

== Rules ==
The final was played on a home-and-away two-legged basis. This was a change from the previous year when the final had been played as a single game. The order of the legs was decided by a draw. The away goals rule, extra time (away goals do not apply in extra time) and penalty shoot-out were used to decide the winner, if necessary.

== Match details ==
=== First leg ===
==== Team news ====
FC Seoul's squad featured veterans of its previous campaigns, and a Colombian midfielder, Mauricio Molina. Molina had won the 2010 AFC Champions League premiership title as part of Seongnam Ilhwa Chunma. FC Seoul was without its defender, Cha Du-ri, for the first leg of the final due to his suspension. A veteran Brazilian, Adilson dos Santos, replaced him. dos Santos was expected to play at right-back.

Guanghzhou's Brazilian striker, Muriqui, was the leading scorer in the competition. He had made 13 goals prior to the final. Dario Conca and Elkeson, both from South America, had also made significant contributions. Lippi confirmed that right-back Zhang Linpeng and midfielder Zhao Xuri had recovered from injury.

==== Summary ====
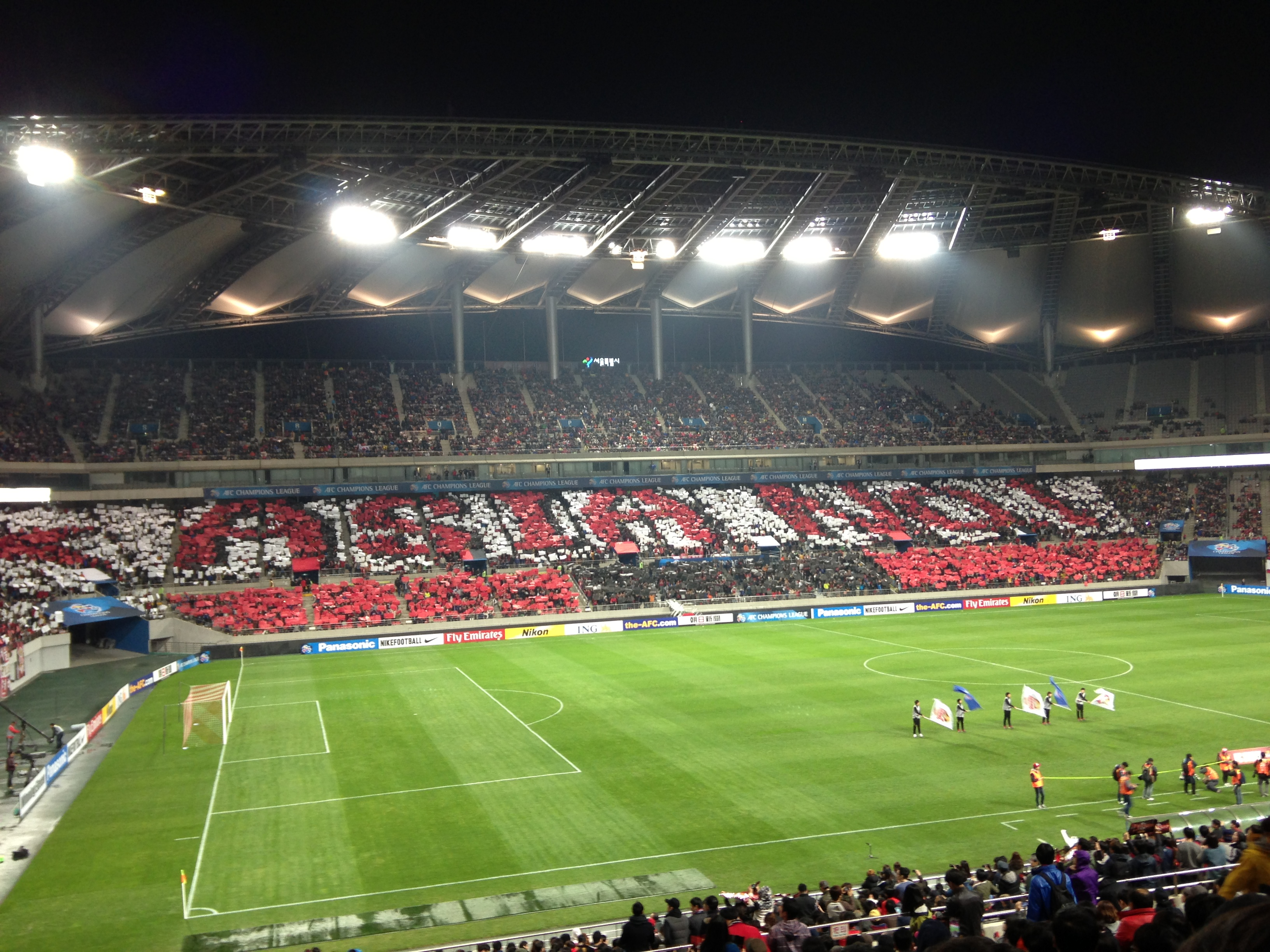
The first leg of the 2013 AFC Champions League Final in the Seoul World Cup Stadium.

55,501 patrons attended the first game at the Seoul World Cup Stadium. Sergio Escudero for FC Seoul, scored in the eleventh minute of the match. However, fifteen minutes before half time, Elkeson (who had scored four goals in the previous four games) scored at the equalizer.

The China international, Gao Lin, then added to the Brazilian's header a minute before the hour mark, and despite Montenegrin striker Damjanovic equalizing with seven minutes remaining, Guangzhou headed into the next month's second leg in pole position. Guangzhou came close to a breakthrough after eight minutes as Dario Conca's shot was palmed back out towards the penalty spot, only for Huang Bowen to blaze over the crossbar. But just two minutes later, FC Seoul took the lead as Guangzhou's defence failed to deal with a quickly taken free-kick and Escudero held off Feng Xiaoting before coolly beating the goalkeeper, Zeng Cheng, with a low shot from just inside the penalty area.

At twenty minutes, Gao made a goal for Guangzhou: his angled strike from inside the area was kicked away by FC Seoul goal keeper, Kim Yong-Dae, before Elkeson fired over from Zhang Linpeng's cross. Guangzhou was back on level terms 16 minutes before half-time as Huang's left wing corner was met by the unmarked Elkeson and the Brazilian's downward header from the edge of the six yard area gave Kim little chance despite a despairing dive from the FC Seoul goalkeeper. Guangzhou finished the first half strongly and almost completed the comeback in stoppage time as Kim had to be on his toes to push a rising strike from Conca away at his near post.

FC Seoul striker Damjanovic made a strike at goal seven minutes into the second half. One minute before the hour mark, Guangzhou took the lead as FC Seoul's defence failed to fully clear the danger inside their penalty area and Sun Xiang's low drilled cross was diverted into the back of the net at the near post when Gao Lin poked it in. Damjanovic again went close to making another goal for FC Seoul after 66 minutes, only to be denied by a last-ditch block by Sun Xiang before Koh Myong-Jin fired into the side netting.

Guangzhou should have added a third point with seven minutes remaining as Elkeson fired a tame effort straight at Kim from a promising position. FC Seoul took full advantage less than a minute later as substitute Yun Il-Lok found Escudero in space on the left and Yun's cut back found Damjanovic, who calmly swept the ball past Zeng from inside the area.

The last play of the match fell to FC Seoul as a counter-attack quickly established itself between FC Seoul's striking partnership of Damjanovic and Escudero. However, Damjanovic's shot was blocked by Zeng Cheng before the whistle blew.

==== Details ====
26 October 2013
19:30 UTC+9

FC Seoul (South Korea)	2–2	(China) Guangzhou Evergrande
Escudero 11'; Damjanović 83'	Report	Elkeson 30'; Gao Lin 58'

Seoul World Cup Stadium, Seoul
Attendance: 55,501
Referee: Ravshan Irmatov (Uzbekistan)

**FC Seoul**	**Guangzhou Evergrande**

**Formation: 4–4–2**
GK	1	(South Korea) Kim Yong-dae
DF	2	(South Korea) Choi Hyo-jin
DF	4	(South Korea) Kim Ju-young
DF	6	(South Korea) Kim Jin-kyu
DF	8	(Brazil) Adilson dos Santos
MF	11	(Colombia) Mauricio Molina
MF	16	(South Korea) Ha Dae-sung (c)
MF	21	(South Korea) Go Yo-han		(substituted off) 77'
MF	22	(South Korea) Koh Myong-jin
FW	9	(Japan) Sergio Escudero	(yellow card) 70'
FW	10	(Montenegro) Dejan Damjanović
**Substitutes**
GK	31	(South Korea) Yu Sang-hun
DF	7	(South Korea) Kim Chi-woo
MF	17	(South Korea) Choi Hyun-tae
MF	24	(South Korea) Yun Il-lok		(substituted on) 77'
MF	29	(South Korea) Lee Sang-hyeob
MF	33	(South Korea) Choi Tae-uk
FW	18	(South Korea) Kim Hyun-sung
**Manager**
(South Korea) Choi Yong-soo

**Formation: 4–2–3–1**
GK	19	(China) Zeng Cheng
DF	5	(China) Zhang Linpeng
DF	6	(China) Feng Xiaoting	(yellow card) 38'
DF	28	(South Korea) Kim Young-gwon
DF	32	(China) Sun Xiang		(substituted off) 87'
MF	10	(China) Zheng Zhi (c)
MF	11	(Brazil) Muriqui
MF	15	(Argentina) Darío Conca
MF	16	(China) Huang Bowen
MF	29	(China) Gao Lin		(substituted off) 75'
FW	9	(Brazil) Elkeson
**Substitutes**
GK	22	(China) Li Shuai
DF	4	(China) Zhao Peng
DF	33	(China) Rong Hao		(substituted on) 75'
MF	7	(China) Feng Junyan
MF	8	(China) Qin Sheng
MF	37	(China) Zhao Xuri		(substituted on) 87'
FW	30	(China) Yang Chaosheng
**Manager**
(Italy) Marcello Lippi

AFC Man of the Match:
(Montenegro) Dejan Damjanović (FC Seoul)
Fans' Man of the Match:
(Japan) Sergio Escudero (FC Seoul)

Assistant referees:
Abdukhamidullo Rasulov (Uzbekistan)
Bakhadyr Kochkarov (Kyrgyzstan)
Fourth official:
Valentin Kovalenko (Uzbekistan)

==== Statistics ====
First half
	FC Seoul	Guangzhou Evergrande
Goals scored	1	1
Total shots	3	5
Shots on target	2	3
Saves	2	1
Ball possession	47%	53%
Corner kicks	1	2
Fouls committed	11	11
Offsides	0	1
Yellow cards	0	1
Red cards	0	0

Second half
	FC Seoul	Guangzhou Evergrande
Goals scored	1	1
Total shots	11	3
Shots on target	7	2
Saves	1	6
Ball possession	52%	48%
Corner kicks	6	4
Fouls committed	10	3
Offsides	1	0
Yellow cards	1	0
Red cards	0	0

Overall
	FC Seoul	Guangzhou Evergrande
Goals scored	2	2
Total shots	14	8
Shots on target	9	5
Saves	3	7
Ball possession	50%	50%
Corner kicks	7	6
Fouls committed	21	14
Offsides	1	1
Yellow cards	1	1
Red cards	0	0

==== Reactions ====
After the first game, the FC Seoul head coach, Choi Yong-Soo, was confident his team could secure the win needed in the second leg to claim the AFC Champions League premiership. He said, "It was a tough match, as you expect to see in the AFC Champions League final. We always prepare to win but we drew in our home game. But we have an opportunity to win the game in the second leg; we're never going to give up and we can do it."

Marcello Lippi rued a string of missed opportunities. He said, "The match was well-fought throughout. The game was quite balanced between both teams. It’s been a period when we’ve had a couple of players out injured and this was their first match for 20 days. But FC Seoul are a good team and they attack well and Damjanovic defends the ball well with his body."

=== Second leg ===
==== Team news ====
At the time of the second game, the Guangzhou Evergrande squad was fit. Lippi left Muriqui and right-back Zhang Linpeng out of his side for the Chinese Super League crown 5-0 win over Wuhan Zall. Lippi said, "We are all ready. All of our injured players are ready for tomorrow’s match."

For Seoul FC, right-back Cha Du-ri returned after missing the first game due to suspension. The left-back Kim Chi-Woo was injured. The former Germany-based defender, Cha, was recalled to the side for the win over Suwon at the expense of Choi Hyo-Jin. The veteran Brazilian defender, Adilson, retained his place ahead of Kim. The midfielder, Yun Il-Lok, started ahead of Go Yo-Han in the win over Suwon.

==== Summary ====
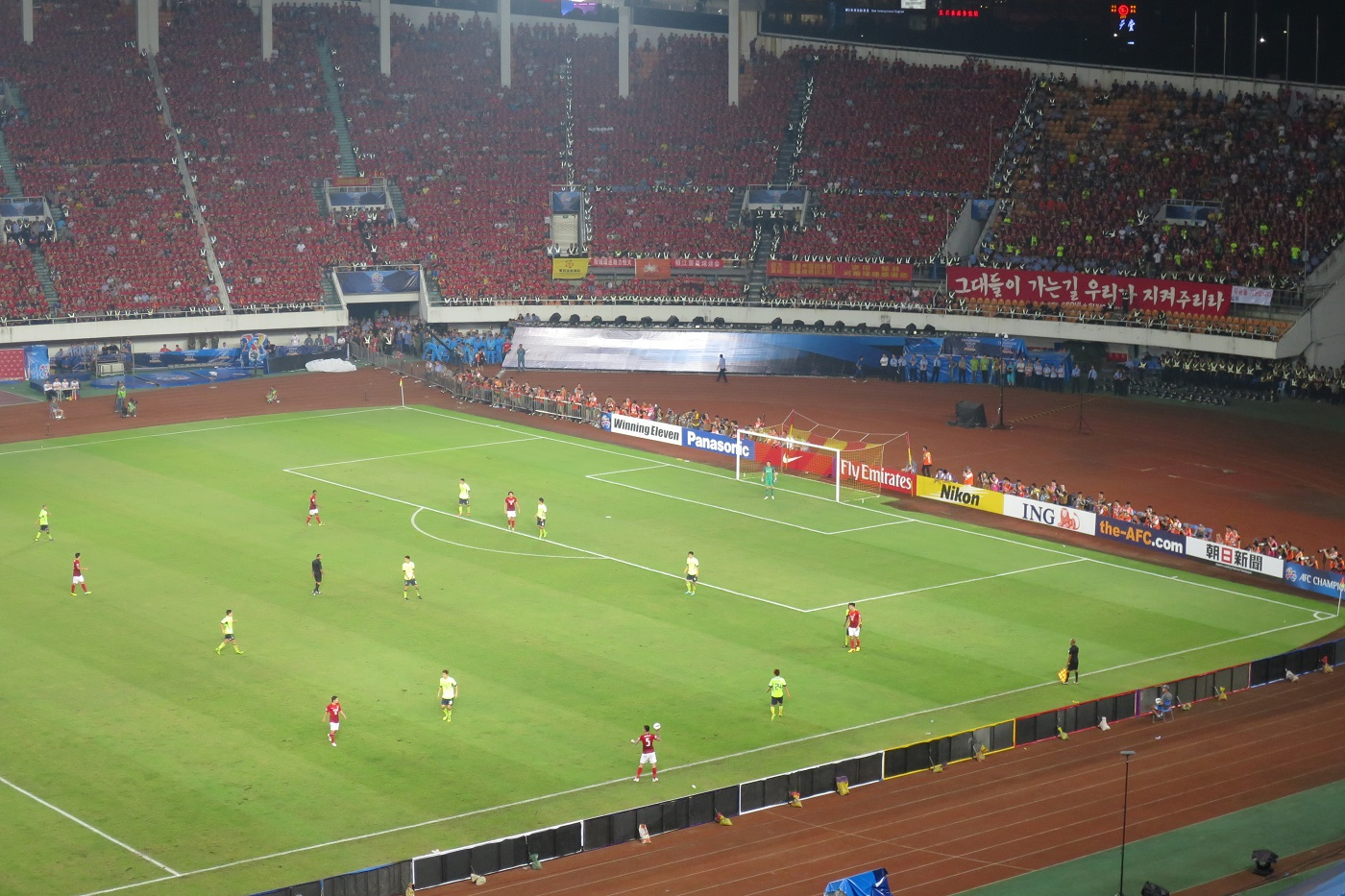
The second leg of the 2013 AFC Champions League Final in Tianhe Stadium.

Guangzhou Evergrande became the first Chinese club to win the AFC Champions League premiership since the creation of the League format in 2002. Guangzhou secured the premiership on the away goals ruling after a 1-1 draw at Tianhe Stadium, securing an aggregate 3-3 over the two legs of the final against FC Seoul.

Guangzhou Evergrande started with one change as Zhao Xuri replaced Gao Lin, thus moving Conca as a false nine. This move shocked many experts due to Gao's influential role in the season. FC Seoul swapped Cha Du-Ri in for Choi Hyo-Jin due to Cha getting a yellow card in both matches against Esteghlal during the semifinals.

Brazilian striker Elkeson gave Guangzhou the lead in the 58th minute with his sixth goal in six AFC Champions League games. Dejan Damjanovic levelled the score four minutes later. FC Seoul could not find their way through the home defence to claim the goal needed to keep the premiership. Guangzhou was the deserved winner, having dominated throughout. FC Seoul was unable to register a first half chance of note as the home team controlled the tempo during the majority of the opening period. Zhao Xuri headed Sun Xiang’s cross from the left over the bar in the 11th minute after an impressive build-up by the home side. Five minutes later, Dario Conca's shot on the turn clipped the base of the post.

Guangzhou dominated possession, forcing FC Seoul to sit deep. Guangzhou created an increasing number of chances for their side and spurned those of FC Seoul. Conca’s shot from long range was just wide. Kim Yong-Dae dropped to his right to push Elkeson’s effort away for a corner. Elkeson’s attempt at a scissor kick also failed to hit the target in the 27th minute. Zhang Linpeng, who delivered the cross for the Brazilian’s effort, was booked six minutes later for an over-exuberant challenge. Zhang was joined in the book on the stroke of halftime by FC Seoul captain Ha Dae-Sung, who was sanctioned for persistent fouling. Elkeson had earlier spurned an opening when he headed straight at Kim following Sun’s deflected cross.

Five minutes into the second half, Muriqui forced Kim into a reflect save with his feet after being put through on goal by Huang Bowen. Huang’s shot from range, less than a minute later, was straight at the FC Seoul keeper. Seven minutes later, Guangzhou secured their advantage. Muriqui slipped the ball through the middle of the FC Seoul defence. Elkeson’s deft first touch put him in position to stroke the ball beyond Kim and into the bottom corner.

Guangzhou's lead lasted four minutes. Sergio Escudero held off the Guangzhou defence, releasing Damjanovic who, having barely seen sight of the goal all the game, finished with conviction to Zeng Cheng’s right to put the game in the balance once more.

Both sides pushed for a second in the final half-hour of the game but, despite increasingly frantic action, neither goalkeeper was troubled, and Guangzhou held on. The crowd of over 42,000 fans became deliriously happy.

==== Details ====
9 November 2013
20:00 UTC+8

Guangzhou Evergrande (China)	1–1	(South Korea) FC Seoul
Elkeson 58'	Report	Damjanović 63'

Tianhe Stadium, Guangzhou
Attendance: 55,847
Referee: Nawaf Shukralla (Bahrain)

**Guangzhou Evergrande**	**FC Seoul**

**Formation: 4–3–3**
GK	19	(China) Zeng Cheng	(yellow card) 90+3'
DF	5	(China) Zhang Linpeng	(yellow card) 33'
DF	6	(China) Feng Xiaoting
DF	28	(South Korea) Kim Young-gwon
DF	32	(China) Sun Xiang
MF	10	(China) Zheng Zhi (c)
MF	16	(China) Huang Bowen
MF	37	(China) Zhao Xuri		(substituted off) 67'
FW	9	(Brazil) Elkeson
FW	11	(Brazil) Muriqui		(substituted off) 90'
FW	15	(Argentina) Darío Conca
**Substitutes**
GK	22	(China) Li Shuai
DF	4	(China) Zhao Peng
DF	33	(China) Rong Hao
MF	7	(China) Feng Junyan
MF	8	(China) Qin Sheng		(substituted on) 90'
MF	14	(China) Feng Renliang
FW	29	(China) Gao Lin		(substituted on) 67'
**Manager**
(Italy) Marcello Lippi

**Formation: 4-4-2**
GK	1	(South Korea) Kim Yong-dae
DF	4	(South Korea) Kim Ju-young
DF	5	(South Korea) Cha Du-ri
DF	6	(South Korea) Kim Jin-kyu	(yellow card) 65'
DF	8	(Brazil) Adilson dos Santos
MF	11	(Colombia) Mauricio Molina
MF	16	(South Korea) Ha Dae-sung (c)	(yellow card) 45+1'	(substituted off) 84'
MF	21	(South Korea) Go Yo-han		(substituted off) 46'
MF	22	(South Korea) Koh Myong-jin
FW	9	(Japan) Sergio Escudero
FW	10	(Montenegro) Dejan Damjanović
**Substitutes**
GK	31	(South Korea) Yu Sang-hun
DF	2	(South Korea) Choi Hyo-jin
DF	7	(South Korea) Kim Chi-woo
MF	17	(South Korea) Choi Hyun-tae		(substituted on) 84'
MF	24	(South Korea) Yun Il-lok		(substituted on) 46'
MF	33	(South Korea) Choi Tae-uk
FW	14	(South Korea) Park Hee-seong
**Manager**
(South Korea) Choi Yong-soo

AFC Man of the Match:
(Argentina) Darío Conca (Guangzhou Evergrande)
Fans' Man of the Match:
(China) Zheng Zhi (Guangzhou Evergrande)

Assistant referees:
Yasser Tulefat (Bahrain)
Ebrahim Sabt Saleh (Bahrain)
Fourth official:
Ali Abdulnabi (Bahrain)

==== Statistics ====
First half
	Guangzhou Evergrande	FC Seoul
Goals scored	0	0
Total shots	10	2
Shots on target	3	0
Saves	0	3
Ball possession	52%	48%
Corner kicks	4	1
Fouls committed	5	9
Offsides	0	0
Yellow cards	1	1
Red cards	0	0

Second half
	Guangzhou Evergrande	FC Seoul
Goals scored	1	1
Total shots	8	11
Shots on target	5	5
Saves	4	4
Ball possession	48%	52%
Corner kicks	0	6
Fouls committed	13	11
Offsides	3	0
Yellow cards	1	1
Red cards	0	0

Overall
	Guangzhou Evergrande	FC Seoul
Goals scored	1	1
Total shots	18	13
Shots on target	8	5
Saves	4	7
Ball possession	50%	50%
Corner kicks	4	7
Fouls committed	18	20
Offsides	3	0
Yellow cards	2	2
Red cards	0	0

==== Reactions ====
Marcello Lippi hailed his team's win and defended the nature of its win on away goals, claiming that the success was deserved based on the team's performance throughout the competition, FC Seoul's head coach, Choi Yong-Soo, was magnanimous in defeat.

== Television coverage ==
The first leg of the final at Seoul World Cup Stadium averaged 17.42 million viewers in China, the second-highest figure for that year for a sporting event. CCTV-5 contributed 14.83 million viewers to the average live audience. In China, the game had 62.62 million viewers across six channels. The average viewer figure was forty-three percent higher than the previous best, which was recorded for Guangzhou's semi-final second leg win over Japan's Kashiwa Reysol. The second leg attracted an average audience of 23.68 million viewers on CCTV-5.
