= Lee Sang-hyeob =

South Korean footballer (born 1990)

Personal information
- Date of birth: 1 January 1990 (age 36)
- Place of birth: Incheon, South Korea
- Height: 1.77 m (5 ft 9 1/2 in)
- Position: Midfielder

Team information
- Current team: Paju Citizen FC

Youth career
- 2009–2012: Korea University

Senior career*
Years	Team	Apps	(Gls)
2013–2017	FC Seoul	39	(1)
2017–	Incheon United	20	(0)
2018–2019	→ Sangju Sangmu (army)	8	(0)
2021–	Paju Citizen FC	48	(1)
- * Club domestic league appearances and goals as of 24 October 2022

- Lee Sang-hyeob
- Hangul: 이상협
- RR: I Sanghyeop
- MR: I Sanghyŏp

Lee Sang-hyeob (Korean: 이상협; born 1 January 1990) is a South Korean footballer who plays as a midfielder for Paju Citizen FC.

He debuted on July 7, 2013 in K League Classic and was praised for his good play by South Korea Football legend Cha Bum-kun.

His role model is Ha Dae-sung and he is the rising star of FC Seoul.

He was in the squad for the 2013 AFC Champions League Final but did not play in that match.
