= Choi Bong-won =

South Korean footballer

Personal information
- Date of birth: 16 May 1994 (age 32)
- Place of birth: South Korea
- Height: 1.88 m (6 ft 2 in)
- Position: Defender

Senior career*
Years	Team	Apps	(Gls)
2013–2014	FC Seoul	0	(0)
2014–2016	FC Slovan Liberec	0	(0)
2016–2017	St. Andrews F.C.	46	(2)
2017–2018	FC MAS Táborsko	1	(0)
2018–2020	J.FC Miyazaki		
- * Club domestic league appearances and goals

Choi Bong-won (Korean: 최봉원; Japan: チェ ボンウォン; born 16 May 1994 in South Korea) is a South Korean retired footballer.

== Career ==
After failing to make an appearance with Seoul, Choi joined Czech second-tier side Slovan Liberec to become a better player physically. He made his professional debut on 23 September 2015, playing in their 1–1 draw against Varnsdorf in the Czech Cup. However, that would be his only appearance with the team.

For the second half of 2015/16, Choi signed for St. Andrews in Malta before sealing a move back to the Czech second division with MAS Táborsko, where he again made one appearance and mostly played with their B team. From there, he signed for J.FC Miyazaki in the Japanese fifth division.
