= Yoon Seung-hyeon =

South Korean footballer (born 1988)

Personal information
- Full name: Yoon Seung-hyeon
- Date of birth: 13 December 1988 (age 37)
- Place of birth: South Korea
- Height: 1.77 m (5 ft 9 1/2 in)
- Position: Winger

Team information
- Current team: Daejeon Korail
- Number: 30

Youth career
- 2007–2010: Yonsei University

Senior career*
Years	Team	Apps	(Gls)
2011–2013	FC Seoul	1	(0)
2012	→ Seongnam Ilhwa (loan)	5	(0)
2013	→ Incheon Korail (loan)	24	(6)
2014	Istra 1961	8	(1)
2014–	Daejeon Korail	8	(2)
- * Club domestic league appearances and goals as of 1 January 2015

Yoon Seung-hyeon (Korean: 윤승현; born 13 December 1988) is a South Korean footballer who plays as a winger for Daejeon Korail in Korea National League.
