= Youn Sung-woo =

South Korean footballer (born 1989)

Youn Sung-Woo
Personal information
- Full name: Youn Sung-Woo
- Date of birth: 8 November 1989 (age 37)
- Place of birth: South Korea
- Height: 1.78 m (5 ft 10 in)
- Position: Midfielder

Team information
- Current team: Goyang Hi FC
- Number: 19

Youth career
- 2008–2011: Sangji University

Senior career*
Years	Team	Apps	(Gls)
2012–2013	FC Seoul	1	(0)
2013	→ Goyang Hi FC (loan)	22	(0)
- * Club domestic league appearances and goals as of 20 December 2013

Youn Sung-Woo (Korean: 윤성우; born 8 November 1989) is a South Korean footballer who played as midfielder for Goyang Hi FC in K League Challenge.

== Career ==
He was selected by FC Seoul in 2012 K-League draft. He made only an appearance in his debut season.

He moved to Goyang Hi FC on loan in 2013.
