= Kim Dong-woo =

South Korean footballer (born 1988)

Kim Dongwoo
Personal information
- Date of birth: February 5, 1988 (age 38)
- Place of birth: Jeju-do, South Korea
- Height: 1.89 m (6 ft 2 1/2 in)
- Position: Centre back

Team information
- Current team: Suwon FC
- Number: 26

Youth career
- 2006–2009: Chosun University

Senior career*
Years	Team	Apps	(Gls)
2010–2018	FC Seoul	92	(2)
2013–2014	→ Ansan Police (military Service)	38	(4)
2017	→ Daegu FC (loan)	14	(0)
2019	Jeju United	26	(0)
2020–2021	Busan IPark	28	(1)
2021-	Suwon FC	12	(1)
- * Club domestic league appearances and goals as of 28 November 2020 ‡ National team caps and goals as of 15 August 2011

- Kim Dong-woo
- Hangul: 김동우
- Hanja: 金東宇
- RR: Gim Dongu
- MR: Kim Tongu

Kim Dongwoo (Korean: 김동우; born February 5, 1988) is a South Korean football player who plays for Suwon FC.
