= Moon Ki-han =

South Korean footballer (born 1989)

Personal information
- Full name: Moon Ki-han
- Date of birth: March 17, 1989 (age 37)
- Place of birth: Busan, South Korea
- Height: 1.77 m (5 ft 10 in)
- Position: Central midfielder

Team information
- Current team: Dangjin Citizen FC
- Number: 7

Youth career
- 2005–2007: FC Seoul

Senior career*
Years	Team	Apps	(Gls)
2008–2015	FC Seoul	14	(0)
2013–2014	→ Ansan Police (army)	49	(3)
2015	→ Daegu FC (loan)	37	(1)
2016–2019	Bucheon FC 1995	126	(10)
2020	Gangneung City FC	20	(2)
2021	Hwaseong FC	13	(0)
2022-	Dangjin Citizen FC	25	(2)

International career^{‡}
2007–2009	South Korea U20	13	(1)
2009–2011	South Korea U23	5	(0)
- * Club domestic league appearances and goals as of 21 October 2022 ‡ National team caps and goals as of 9 October 2015

Moon Ki-han (Korean: 문기한; born March 17, 1989) is a South Korean footballer who currently plays as midfielder for Dangjin Citizen FC.

== Club career statistics ==
Statistics accurate as of 25 December 2016

Club performance			League		Cup		League Cup		Continental		Total	
Season	Club	League	Apps	Goals	Apps	Goals	Apps	Goals	Apps	Goals	Apps	Goals
South Korea			League		KFA Cup		League Cup		Asia		Total	
2008	FC Seoul	K League 1	1	0	0	0	2	0	–		3	0
2009	FC Seoul	K League 1	0	0	0	0	0	0	0	0	0	0
2010	FC Seoul	K League 1	0	0	0	0	0	0	–		0	0
2011	FC Seoul	K League 1	12	0	2	0	1	0	7	0	22	0
2012	FC Seoul	K League 1	1	0	0	0	–		0	0	1	0
2013	Ansan Police	K League 2	28	2	0	0	–		–		28	2
2014	Ansan Police	K League 2	21	1	0	0	–		–		21	1
2015	Daegu FC	K League 2	37	1	0	0	–		–		37	1
2016	Bucheon FC 1995	K League 2	37	4	1	0	–		–		38	4
Total	South Korea		137	8	3	0	3	0	7	0	150	8
Career total			137	8	3	0	3	0	7	0	150	8
