= Kim Yong-chan =

South Korean footballer (born 1990)

Kim Yong-Chan
Personal information
- Full name: Kim Yong-Chan
- Date of birth: 8 April 1990 (age 36)
- Place of birth: South Korea
- Height: 1.73 m (5 ft 8 in)
- Position: Full back

Team information
- Current team: Chungju Hummel
- Number: 16

Youth career
- 2009–2011: Ajou University

Senior career*
Years	Team	Apps	(Gls)
2012	FC Seoul	0	(0)
2013	Gyeongnam FC	23	(0)
2014	Incheon United	0	(0)
2015	Chungju Hummel	6	(0)
- * Club domestic league appearances and goals as of 23 December 2015

Kim Yong-Chan (Korean: 김용찬; born 8 April 1990) is a South Korean footballer who played as full back for Chungju Hummel in K League Challenge.

== Career ==
He was selected by FC Seoul in the 2012 K-League draft but did not appear for the capital team.

He moved to Gyeongnam FC before the 2013 season starts.
