= Lee Jae-kwon =

South Korean footballer (born 1987)

Personal information
- Full name: Lee Jae-kwon
- Date of birth: July 30, 1987 (age 39)
- Place of birth: South Korea
- Height: 1.76 m (5 ft 9 1/2 in)
- Position: Central midfielder

Team information
- Current team: Changwon City FC
- Number: 8

Youth career
- 2006–2009: Korea University

Senior career*
Years	Team	Apps	(Gls)
2010–2011	Incheon United	54	(1)
2012–2015	FC Seoul	7	(0)
2014–2015	→ Ansan Police (army)	44	(6)
2016–2017	Daegu FC	50	(2)
2017–2018	Busan IPark	42	(2)
2019–2020	Gangwon FC	20	(1)
2021	Gimpo Citizen FC	15	(0)
2022 -	Changwon City FC	21	(3)
- * Club domestic league appearances and goals as of 21 October 2022

Lee Jae-kwon (Korean: 이재권; born 30 July 1987) is a South Korean football midfielder who plays for Changwon City FC.

== Club career ==
Lee, having spent his youth career at Korea University, entered the 2010 K-League draft intake, and was selected by Incheon United FC for the 2010 season. His professional debut came almost immediately, in Incheon's first K-League match of the season against the Chunnam Dragons. Substituted early in the second half, the match finished in a 1–0 win for his new club. A month later, Lee scored his first goal in Incheon's 1–2 loss to Ulsan Hyundai. Having established himself as a first choice starter at Incheon for the rest of 2010, Lee remained with the club for the 2011 season.

On 1 February 2012, Lee joined fellow league side FC Seoul, in a swap deal which saw Lee Kyu-ro joining Incheon.

== Club career statistics ==
As of 9 December 2018

Club performance			League		Cup		League Cup		Other		Total	
Season	Club	League	Apps	Goals	Apps	Goals	Apps	Goals	Apps	Goals	Apps	Goals
South Korea			League		KFA Cup		League Cup		Play-offs		Total	
2010	Incheon United	K League 1	27	1	0	0	3	0	–		30	1
2011	Incheon United	K League 1	27	0	2	0	2	0	–		31	0
2012	FC Seoul	K League 1	6	0	0	0	–		–		6	0
2013	FC Seoul	K League 1	1	0	0	0	–		0	0	1	0
2014	Asan Mugunghwa	K League 2	35	6	0	0	–		0	0	35	6
2015	Asan Mugunghwa	K League 2	10	0	0	0	–		0	0	10	0
2016	Daegu FC	K League 2	39	2	0	0	–		0	0	39	2
2017	Daegu FC	K League 1	11	0	0	0	–		0	0	11	0
2017	Busan IPark	K League 2	14	2	3	0	–		2	0	19	2
2018	Busan IPark	K League 2	28	0	1	0	–		2	0	31	0
Career total			198	11	6	0	5	0	4	0	213	11
