= Kim Jin-kyu (footballer, born 1985) =

South Korean footballer (born 1985)

Personal information
- Date of birth: 16 February 1985 (age 41)
- Place of birth: Yeongdeok, Gyeongbuk, South Korea
- Height: 1.83 m (6 ft 0 in)
- Position: Centre back

Youth career
- 2000–2002: Andong High School

Senior career*
Years	Team	Apps	(Gls)
2003–2004	Jeonnam Dragons	21	(1)
2005–2006	Júbilo Iwata	47	(4)
2007	Jeonnam Dragons	8	(2)
2007–2010	FC Seoul	85	(1)
2011	Dalian Shide	8	(0)
2011	Ventforet Kofu	4	(1)
2012–2015	FC Seoul	120	(12)
2016	Muangthong United	0	(0)
2016	→ Pattaya United (loan)	14	(0)
2016	Fagiano Okayama	10	(1)
2017	Daejeon Citizen	13	(0)

International career
2003–2005	South Korea U20	26	(2)
2004–2008	South Korea U23	27	(1)
2004–2012	South Korea	42	(3)
- * Club domestic league appearances and goals

- Kim Jin-kyu
- Hangul: 김진규
- Hanja: 金珍圭
- RR: Gim Jingyu
- MR: Kim Chin'gyu

Kim Jin-kyu (born 16 February 1985) is a retired South Korean football player. He has gained reputation as a defender who is also capable of scoring.

== Club career ==
He began playing football during 4th grade at elementary school influenced by his older brother. After graduating from Andong High School, he headed straight to K League instead of playing for a university. During his days at Jeonnam Dragons, he set a record by becoming the youngest player to score a goal in his team. He later transferred to Júbilo Iwata in 2005.

Kim returned to Jeonnam Dragons in January 2007 amid rumours he will return to South Korea by playing for Suwon Samsung Bluewings. Kim wanted to keep his promise with coach Huh Jung-moo, who wanted him to play for Jeonnam because the coach helped him "during a difficult time".

On 25 July 2007, he joined FC Seoul. He was in FC Seoul which won the K League in 2010.

Kim transferred to Chinese Super League side Dalian Shide in January 2011. However, after Dalian's Korean manager Park Sung-hwa was sacked in May 2011, he lost his position in the club. Kim was loaned to J1 League club Ventforet Kofu for six months in July after managing eight appearances for the Chinese club. He returned to FC Seoul after Kofu were relegated to the Second Division.

In 2016 Kim signed for Pattaya United on loan from Muangthong United in the Thai Premier League.

== International career ==
He gained praise and notoriety during 2005 East Asian Football Championship. The Chinese coach at that time had pledged to end Koreaphobia by winning the match against Korea. The Chinese scored the first goal in the first half, but Kim prevented loss against China by scoring an equaliser. In 2006, he was selected to represent South Korea in FIFA World Cup. This time, however, his performance was below expectations when he played for Korea against Switzerland.

Kim was made captain in the Korean national football team for the 2008 Summer Olympics. Following the appointment as captain, Kim stated he would no longer free kick during the tournament.

He was included in the South Korea national football teams for the 2003 FIFA World Youth Championship, 2005 FIFA World Youth Championship, 2008 Summer Olympics, 2004 Asian Cup, 2005 East Asian Football Championship, 2006 World Cup, and 2007 Asian Cup.

== Career statistics ==
=== Club ===
As of 31 December 2015

Club performance			League		Cup		League Cup		Continental		Total	
Season	Club	League	Apps	Goals	Apps	Goals	Apps	Goals	Apps	Goals	Apps	Goals
South Korea			League		KFA Cup		League Cup		Asia		Total	
2003	Jeonnam Dragons	K League 1	11	1	0	0	—		—		11	1
2004	Jeonnam Dragons	K League 1	10	0	3	0	5	1	—		18	1
Japan			League		Emperor's Cup		League Cup		Asia		Total	
2005	Júbilo Iwata	J.League	24	1	1	1	1	0	4	0	30	2
2006	Júbilo Iwata	J.League	23	3	2	0	3	0	—		28	3
South Korea			League		KFA Cup		League Cup		Asia		Total	
2007	Jeonnam Dragons	K League 1	8	2	0	0	1	0	4	0	13	2
2007	FC Seoul	K League 1	9	0	2	0	0	0	—		11	0
2008	FC Seoul	K League 1	25	0	1	0	4	0	—		30	0
2009	FC Seoul	K League 1	28	0	2	0	4	0	7	0	41	0
2010	FC Seoul	K League 1	23	1	1	0	7	0	—		31	1
China PR			League		FA Cup		CSL Cup		Asia		Total	
2011	Dalian Shide	Chinese Super League	8	0	1	0	—		—		9	0
Japan			League		Emperor's Cup		League Cup		Asia		Total	
2011	Ventforet Kofu	J.League	4	1	0	0	1	0	—		5	1
South Korea			League		KFA Cup		League Cup		Asia		Total	
2012	FC Seoul	K League 1	37	4	2	0	—		—		39	4
2013	FC Seoul	K League 1	35	6	1	0	—		11	2	47	8
2014	FC Seoul	K League 1	33	2	5	0	—		11	0	49	2
2015	FC Seoul	K League 1	15	0	1	0	—		6	1	22	1
Total	Jeonnam Dragons		29	3	3	0	6	1	4	0	42	4
Total	Júbilo Iwata		47	4	3	1	4	0	4	0	58	5
Total	FC Seoul		205	13	15	0	15	0	35	3	270	16
Total	Dalian Shide		8	0	1	0	0	0	0	0	9	0
Total	Ventforet Kofu		4	1	0	0	1	0	0	0	5	1
Career total			293	21	22	1	26	1	43	3	384	26

=== International ===
Korea Republic national team
Year	Apps	Goals
2004	5	0
2005	11	3
2006	13	0
2007	10	0
2008	2	0
2012	1	0
Total	42	3

==== International goals ====
Results list South Korea's goal tally first.

Date	Venue	Opponent	Score	Result	Competition
January 19, 2005	Los Angeles, United States	Paraguay	1 goal	1–1	Friendly match
July 31, 2005	Daejeon, South Korea	China	1 goal	1–1	2005 East Asian Cup
October 12, 2005	Seoul, South Korea	Iran	1 goal	2–0	Friendly match

== Honours ==
=== Club ===
Jeonnam Dragons

- FA Cup Runner-up: 2003

FC Seoul

- K League 1 Winner (2): 2010, 2012
- K League 1 Runner-up: 2008
- FA Cup Winner (1): 2015
- FA Cup Runner-up (1): 2014
- League Cup Winner: 2010
- League Cup Runner-up: 2007

== Criticism ==
He has been criticized for his hot temper and unprofessional behavior. During the 2004 Asian Cup, he received a red card for his hand gesture against an Iranian player during South Korea's match against Iran national football team, and was suspended for two games.

He was also met with criticism for his performance after South Korea failed to advance to the round of 16 for the 2006 World Cup for his lack of aggressiveness when it has been revealed that he had never used tackles during the matches despite his position as a defender.

Sporting positions
Preceded by Ha Dae-sung	FC Seoul captain 2014	Succeeded by Koh Myong-jin
Preceded by Kim Byung-suk	Daejeon Citizen captain 2017-	Succeeded by incumbent
