= Cho Min-woo =

South Korean footballer (born 1992)

Cho Min-Woo
Personal information
- Date of birth: May 13, 1992 (age 34)
- Place of birth: Seongnam, South Korea
- Height: 1.88 m (6 ft 2 in)
- Position: Centre back

Team information
- Current team: Pohang Steelers
- Number: 20

Youth career
- 2008–2010: Dongbuk High School
- 2011: Dongguk University

Senior career*
Years	Team	Apps	(Gls)
2012–2015	FC Seoul	0	(0)
2013	→ V-Varen Nagasaki (loan)	20	(0)
2014	→ Gangwon FC (loan)	3	(0)
2015	→ V-Varen Nagasaki (loan)	27	(0)
2016	V-Varen Nagasaki	26	(0)
2017–	Pohang Steelers	14	(1)

International career^{‡}
2009	South Korea U-17	0	(0)
- * Club domestic league appearances and goals as of 2 January 2018 ‡ National team caps and goals as of 15 August 2011

Cho Min-Woo (趙民宇, born May 13, 1992) is a South Korean football player who currently plays for Pohang Steelers in K League Classic.

== Club statistics ==
Updated to 23 February 2016.

Club performance			League		Cup		Total	
Season	Club	League	Apps	Goals	Apps	Goals	Apps	Goals
Japan			League		Emperor's Cup		Total	
2012	FC Seoul	K League	0	0	0	0	0	0
2013	V-Varen Nagasaki	J2 League	20	0	0	0	20	0
2014	Gangwon FC	K League	3	0	0	0	3	0
2015	V-Varen Nagasaki	J2 League	27	0	0	0	27	0
Total			50	0	0	0	50	0
