= Han Tae-you =

South Korean footballer (born 1981)

Han Tae-you 한태유
Personal information
- Date of birth: March 31, 1981 (age 45)
- Place of birth: Ulsan, South Korea
- Height: 1.86 m (6 ft 1 in)
- Position: Defensive midfielder

Youth career
- 2000–2003: Myongji University

Senior career*
Years	Team	Apps	(Gls)
2004–2014	FC Seoul	112	(2)
2007–2008	→ Gwangju Sangmu (military service)	42	(2)

International career^{‡}
2003	South Korea U-23	1	(0)
2008–2009	South Korea		(0)
- * Club domestic league appearances and goals as of 30 November 2014 ‡ National team caps and goals as of 4 February 2009

- Han Tae-you
- Hangul: 한태유
- Hanja: 韓泰酉
- RR: Han Taeyu
- MR: Han T'aeyu

Han Tae-you (born March 30, 1981) is a South Korean football player.

== Career statistics ==
As of 24 July 2014

Club performance			League		Cup		League Cup		Continental		Total	
Season	Club	League	Apps	Goals	Apps	Goals	Apps	Goals	Apps	Goals	Apps	Goals
South Korea			League		KFA Cup		League Cup		ACL		Total	
2004	FC Seoul	K League Classic	13	0	0	0	12	0	-		25	0
2005	FC Seoul	K League Classic	16	2	2	0	6	1	-		24	3
2006	FC Seoul	K League Classic	19	0	2	1	9	0	-		30	1
2007	Gwangju Sangmu	K League Classic	21	1	1	0	9	0	-		31	1
2008	Gwangju Sangmu	K League Classic	21	1	1	0	2	0	-		24	1
2008	FC Seoul	K League Classic	2	0	0	0	0	0	-		2	0
2009	FC Seoul	K League Classic	10	0	0	0	0	0	4	0	14	0
2010	FC Seoul	K League Classic	8	0	0	0	0	0	-		8	0
2011	FC Seoul	K League Classic	3	0	0	0	0	0	1	0	4	0
2012	FC Seoul	K League Classic	26	0	0	0	0	0	-		26	0
2013	FC Seoul	K League Classic	15	0	3	1	0	0	10	0	28	1
2014	FC Seoul	K League Classic	0	0	0	0	0	0	0	0	0	0
Total	FC Seoul		112	2	7	2	27	1	15	0	151	5
Total	Gwangju Sangmu		42	2	2	0	11	0	-		55	2
Career total			154	4	9	2	38	1	15	0	206	7

== Honors ==
=== Club ===
FC Seoul

- K League
  - Winners (1): 2010, 2012
- League Cup
  - Winners (1): 2010
