= Kim Won-sik =

South Korean footballer (born 1991)

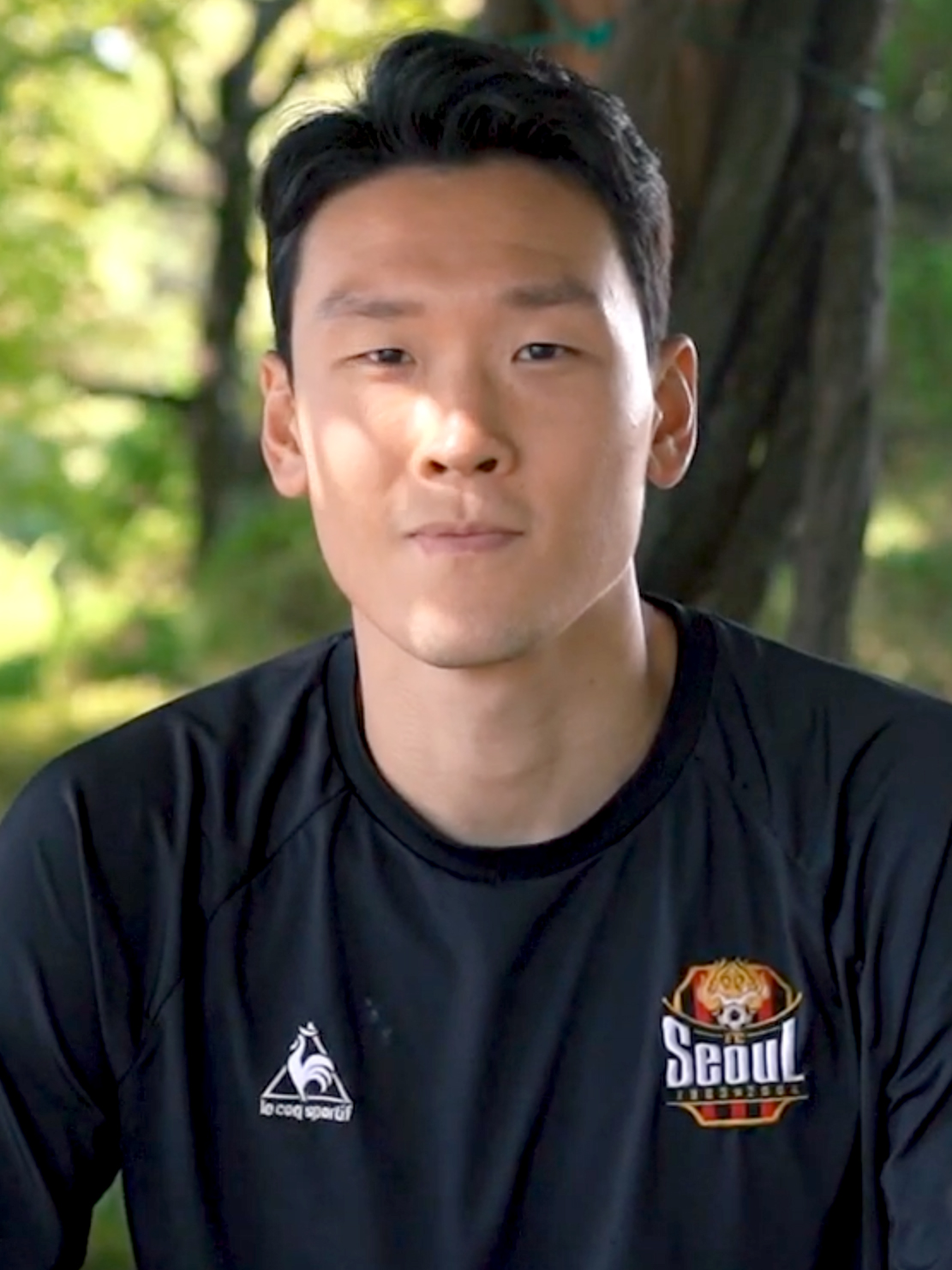
- Kim in September 2020

Personal information
- Date of birth: 5 November 1991 (age 34)
- Place of birth: Seoul, South Korea
- Height: 1.86 m (6 ft 1 in)
- Positions: Centre back; defensive midfielder

Team information
- Current team: Cheonan City
- Number: 15

Youth career
- 2007–2009: FC Seoul
- 2007–2008: → Reading (KFA Youth Project)
- 2009–2010: Valenciennes

Senior career*
Years	Team	Apps	(Gls)
2010–2011	Pau		
2012–2020	FC Seoul	73	(1)
2013–2014	→ Ansan Police (military service)	10	(0)
2015	→ Incheon United (loan)	31	(0)
2021	Gwangju FC	27	(0)
2022–2023	Seoul E-Land	65	(0)
2024	Yeoju FC	6	(0)
2024	Dong A Thanh Hoa	0	(0)
2025–	Cheonan City	4	(0)

International career
2009	South Korea U-20	5	(2)
- * Club domestic league appearances and goals as of 7 January 2026

Kim Won-sik (Korean: 김원식; born 5 November 1991) is a South Korean professional footballer who plays as a centre-back or defensive midfielder for K League 2 club Cheonan City.

== Club career ==
He trained in Reading Academy by KFA overseas training program and played for Pau in the Championnat de France Amateurs.

=== FC Seoul ===
Kim joined FC Seoul as 2012 K League draft pick.

=== Seoul E-Land ===
Kim left Seoul E-Land on 30 December 2023.

=== Dong A Thanh Hoa ===
On 22 August 2024, Kim moved to Vietnam, signing for V.League 1 club Dong A Thanh Hoa. In October 2024, Kim parted ways with Dong A Thanh Hoa.

=== Cheonan City ===
While a free agent, Kim signed a contract with K League 2 club Cheonan City in 2025.
