= Choi Hyun-tae =

South Korean footballer (born 1987)

Choi Hyun-Tae
Personal information
- Full name: Choi Hyun-Tae
- Date of birth: September 15, 1987 (age 39)
- Place of birth: Busan, South Korea
- Height: 1.79 m (5 ft 10 1/2 in)
- Positions: Full back; winger; centre midfielder

Youth career
- 2006–2010: Dong-A University

Senior career*
Years	Team	Apps	(Gls)
2010–2016	FC Seoul	98	(1)
2015–2016	→ Sangju Sangmu (army)	32	(2)
2017–2019	Jeju United	5	(0)
- * Club domestic league appearances and goals as of 1 January 2020

Choi Hyun-Tae (Korean: 최현태; born September 15, 1987) is a South Korean football player who plays for Jeju United.

== Club career ==
=== FC Seoul ===
On 2 April 2013, during an AFC Champions League match versus Vegalta Sendai, Choi was substituted in the 75th minute for Sergio Escudero. In the 84th minute, back-up goalkeeper Yu Sang-hun was sent off for a bad challenge. Since FC Seoul had used all three of their substitutions, Choi was put in the net to be FC Seoul's outfield goalkeeper for the remainder of the full-time and added-time in which saw him let a penalty go in and handle the ball twice.
