= Koh Myong-jin =

South Korean footballer (born 1988)

Koh Myong-jin 고명진
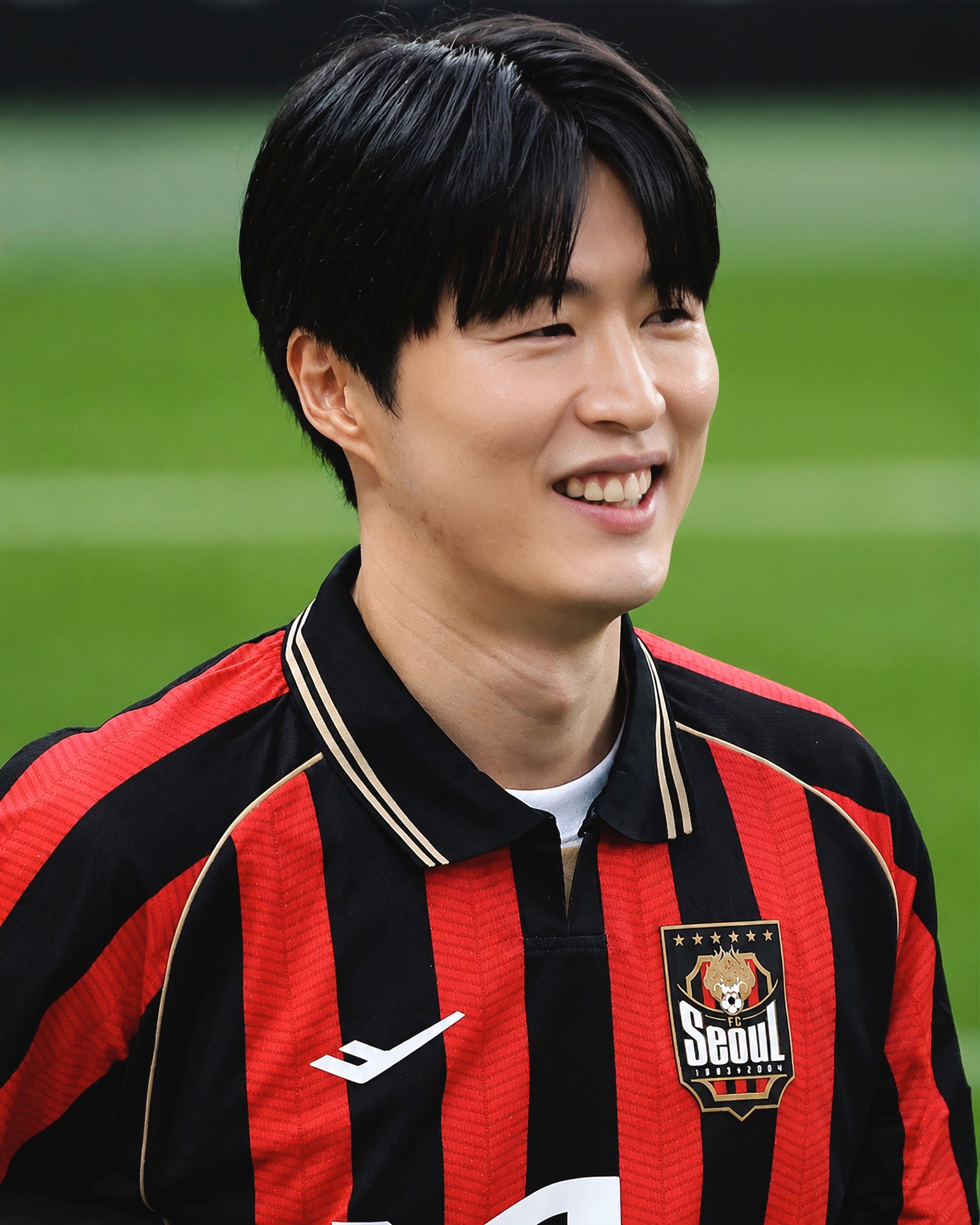
- Koh in 2026

Personal information
- Date of birth: 9 January 1988 (age 38)
- Place of birth: Suwon, Gyeonggi, South Korea
- Height: 1.87 m (6 ft 2 in)
- Position: Midfielder

Team information
- Current team: Ulsan Hyundai
- Number: 22

Youth career
- Seokgwan Middle School

Senior career*
Years	Team	Apps	(Gls)
2003–2015	FC Seoul	192	(13)
2015–2019	Al Rayyan	82	(9)
2019	Slaven Belupo	4	(0)
2020-	Ulsan Hyundai	36	(0)

International career^{‡}
2003–2004	South Korea U17	6	(7)
2007	South Korea U23	1	(0)
2011–	South Korea	5	(0)
- * Club domestic league appearances and goals as of 30 July 2022 ‡ National team caps and goals as of 22 April 2022

- Koh Myong-jin
- Hangul: 고명진
- Hanja: 高明桭
- RR: Go Myeongjin
- MR: Ko Myŏngjin

Koh Myong-jin (Korean: 고명진; Korean pronunciation: [ko.mjʌŋ.dʑin]; born 9 January 1988) is a South Korean professional footballer who plays as a midfielder for Ulsan Hyundai in K League 1.

== Club career ==
Koh joined FC Seoul, then known as the Anyang LG Cheetahs, in 2003. In 2015 he moved to Al-Rayyan. In September 2019, he moved to Slaven Belupo in Croatia, but left the club two months later.

He moved back to South Korea to join Ulsan Hyundai FC ahead of the 2020 K League 1 season. In his first season with Ulsan, he helped them win the 2020 AFC Champions League for the second time in the club's history.

== International career ==
On 23 May 2011, Koh was called up to the South Korea national team for the friendly matches against Serbia and Ghana, though he did not play. He made his national team debut in a friendly match against Australia on 14 November 2012 in a 2–1 loss.

== Career statistics ==
=== Club ===
As of 30 July 2022

Appearances and goals by club, season and competition
Club	Season	League			National cup		League cup		Continental		Total	
Club	Season	Division	Apps	Goals	Apps	Goals	Apps	Goals	Apps	Goals	Apps	Goals
FC Seoul	2004	K League 1	0	0	0	0	2	0	—		2	0
FC Seoul	2005	K League 1	1	0	0	0	0	0	—		1	0
FC Seoul	2006	K League 1	0	0	0	0	6	0	—		6	0
FC Seoul	2007	K League 1	10	1	2	0	2	0	—		14	1
FC Seoul	2008	K League 1	9	1	0	0	5	0	—		14	1
FC Seoul	2009	K League 1	21	2	2	0	3	0	4	0	29	2
FC Seoul	2010	K League 1	7	0	1	0	2	0	—		10	0
FC Seoul	2011	K League 1	24	2	3	0	0	0	4	1	31	3
FC Seoul	2012	K League 1	29	1	1	0	—		—		40	1
FC Seoul	2013	K League 1	30	3	3	0	—		13	2	46	5
FC Seoul	2014	K League 1	31	2	3	0	—		10	0	44	2
FC Seoul	2015	K League 1	20	1	1	0	—		8	1	29	2
FC Seoul	Total		192	13	16	0	20	0	39	4	267	17
Al-Rayann	2015–16	Qatar Stars League	23	2	0	0	0	0	—		23	2
Al-Rayann	2016–17	Qatar Stars League	23	5	0	0	0	0	6	0	29	5
Al-Rayann	2017–18	Qatar Stars League	18	1	0	0	0	0	6	0	24	1
Al-Rayann	2018–19	Qatar Stars League	18	1	0	0	0	0	5	0	23	1
Al-Rayann	Total		82	9	0	0	0	0	17	0	99	9
Slaven Belupo	2019-20	1.HNL	4	0	0	0	—		—		4	0
Ulsan Hyundai	2020	K League 1	14	0	2	0	—		8	0	24	0
Ulsan Hyundai	2021	K League 1	15	0	0	0	—		6	0	21	0
Ulsan Hyundai	2022	K League 1	7	0	1	0	—		5	0	13	0
Ulsan Hyundai	Total		36	0	3	0	0	0	19	0	58	0
Career total			314	22	19	0	20	0	75	4	428	26

== Honours ==
FC Seoul

- K League 1: 2010, 2012
- League Cup: 2006, 2010
- AFC Champions League runner-up: 2013
- FA Cup runner-up: 2014

Al-Rayyan

- Qatar Stars League: 2015–16

Ulsan Hyundai

- AFC Champions League: 2020

Individual

- K League Best XI : 2014

Sporting positions
Preceded by Kim Jin-kyu	FC Seoul captain 2015	Succeeded by Cha Du-ri
