= Kim Hyun-sung =

South Korean footballer (born 1989)

Kim Hyun-sung 김현성
- Kim in 2026

Personal information
- Full name: Kim Hyun-sung
- Date of birth: 27 September 1989 (age 37)
- Place of birth: Suwon, South Korea
- Height: 1.86 m (6 ft 1 in)
- Position: Striker

Youth career
- 2005–2007: FC Seoul
- 2008: Konkuk University

Senior career*
Years	Team	Apps	(Gls)
2009–2015	FC Seoul	53	(6)
2010–2011	→ Daegu FC (loan)	35	(8)
2012	→ Shimizu S-Pulse (loan)	12	(3)
2016–2018	Busan IPark	29	(1)
2019–2021	Seongnam FC	45	(3)
2023	Gyeongju KHNP	4	(0)

International career^{‡}
2011–2012	South Korea U-23	14	(4)
Medal record
Olympic Games
Bronze medal – third place	2012 London	Team
- * Club domestic league appearances and goals as of 27 April 2025 ‡ National team caps and goals as of 17 December 2012

- Kim Hyun-sung
- Hangul: 김현성
- RR: Gim Hyeonseong
- MR: Kim Hyŏnsŏng

Kim Hyun-Sung (Korean: 김현성; born 27 September 1989) is a South Korean football forward. He has played for FC Seoul, Daegu FC, the Japanese club Shimizu S-Pulse, Busan IPark, Seongnam FC, and Gyeongju KHNP. He also represented South Korea in men's football at the 2012 Summer Olympics in London, winning a bronze medal.

== Club career ==
Kim, a product of FC Seoul's youth academy, was elevated to the club's senior squad for the 2009 season, along with a number of other graduates of the academy. However, he failed to appear in a match for FC Seoul in the K League, and for the 2010 season he was loaned to Daegu FC to gain first team experience. He debuted in Daegu's win over Busan IPark in the League Cup on 6 June 2010. His debut in the K-League itself came a month later in a match against Jeonbuk Hyundai Motors, when he came on as a substitute. Remaining with Daegu for the 2011 season, Kim was firmly established in the side, playing all but four K-league matches during the season as well as scoring seven goals. At the end of the 2011 season, his loan agreement expired and Kim returned to FC Seoul.

On 13 January 2016, Kim Hyun-sung joined Busan IPark.

== Club statistics ==
As of 27 April 2025

Club performance			League		Cup		League Cup		Continental		Total	
Season	Club	League	Apps	Goals	Apps	Goals	Apps	Goals	Apps	Goals	Apps	Goals
2009	FC Seoul	K League 1	0	0	0	0	0	0	-		0	0
2010	Daegu FC	K League 1	9	1	0	0	1	0	-		10	1
2011	Daegu FC	K League 1	26	7	1	1	3	0	-		30	8
2012	FC Seoul	K League 1	13	1	2	1	-		-		15	2
2012	Shimizu S-Pulse	J1 League	12	3	2	0	3	0	-		17	3
2013	FC Seoul	K League 1	17	1	2	1	-		5	1	24	3
2014	FC Seoul	K League 1	6	0	0	0	-		5	0	11	0
2015	FC Seoul	K League 1	17	4	2	0	-		7	0	26	4
2016	Busan IPark	K League 2	3	0	0	0	-		-		0	0
2017	Busan IPark	K League 2	4	0	1	0	-		-		0	0
2018	Busan IPark	K League 2	22	1	0	0	-		-		0	0
2019	Seongnam FC	K League 1	23	3	0	0	-		-		23	3
2020	Seongnam FC	K League 1	15	0	3	0	-		-		18	0
2021	Seongnam FC	K League 1	7	0	1	1	-		-		8	0
2023	Gyeongju KHNP	K3 League	4	0	0	0	-		-		4	0
Career total			178	21	14	4	7	0	17	1	216	26

== International career ==
Since 2011, Kim has been a member of the South Korea U-23 team, playing a number of qualifier matches for the Olympics, as well as the 2012 King's Cup, an annual tournament held in Thailand. He played in the Football at the 2012 Summer Olympics and was a bronze medalist.
