= Kim Ju-young =

South Korean footballer (born 1988)

Personal information
- Date of birth: 9 July 1988 (age 38)
- Place of birth: Seoul, South Korea
- Height: 1.84 m (6 ft 1/2 in)
- Position: Centre back

Youth career
- 2004–2006: Singal High School
- 2007–2008: Yonsei University

Senior career*
Years	Team	Apps	(Gls)
2009–2011	Gyeongnam FC	48	(1)
2012–2014	FC Seoul	93	(4)
2015–2016	Shanghai SIPG	41	(0)
2017	Hebei China Fortune	14	(0)
Total		186	(4)

International career^{‡}
2010	South Korea U23	1	(0)
2010–2017	South Korea	10	(0)
Medal record
Men's football
Representing South Korea
AFC Asian Cup
Runner-up	2015 Australia
Asian Games
Bronze medal – third place	2010 Guangzhou	Team
- * Club domestic league appearances and goals as of 4 November 2017 ‡ National team caps and goals as of October 9, 2017

- Kim Ju-young
- Hangul: 김주영
- Hanja: 金周榮
- RR: Gim Juyeong
- MR: Kim Chuyŏng

Kim Ju-young (Korean: 김주영, born July 9, 1988) is a South Korean former football player.

== Honours ==
=== Club ===
FC Seoul

- K League 1
  - Winners (1): 2012
- AFC Champions League
  - Runners-up (1): 2013
- FA Cup
  - Runners-up (1): 2014

=== International ===
South Korea

- EAFF East Asian Cup (1) : 2015

=== Individual ===
- K League Best XI : 2014
- AFC Champions League Dream Team : 2014

== Club career statistics ==
- As of 19 August 2017

Club	Season	League			National cup		League cup		Continental		Total	
Club	Season	Division	Apps	Goals	Apps	Goals	Apps	Goals	Apps	Goals	Apps	Goals
Gyeongnam FC	2009	K League	20	0	2	0	1	0	–		23	0
Gyeongnam FC	2010	K League	24	0	2	0	6	0	–		32	0
Gyeongnam FC	2011	K League	4	1	0	0	0	0	–		4	1
Gyeongnam FC	Total		48	1	4	0	7	0	0	0	59	1
FC Seoul	2012	K League	33	0	1	0	–		–		34	0
FC Seoul	2013	K League	31	2	1	0	–		13	0	45	2
FC Seoul	2014	K League	29	2	4	1	–		12	0	45	3
FC Seoul	Total		93	4	6	1	0	0	25	0	124	5
Shanghai SIPG	2015	Chinese Super League	17	0	2	0	–		–		19	0
Shanghai SIPG	2016	Chinese Super League	24	0	1	0	–		10	0	35	0
Shanghai SIPG	Total		41	0	3	0	0	0	10	0	44	0
Hebei China Fortune	2017	Chinese Super League	14	0	2	0	–		–		16	0
Career total			196	4	15	1	7	0	35	0	253	6
