= Yu Sang-hun =

South Korean footballer (born 1989)

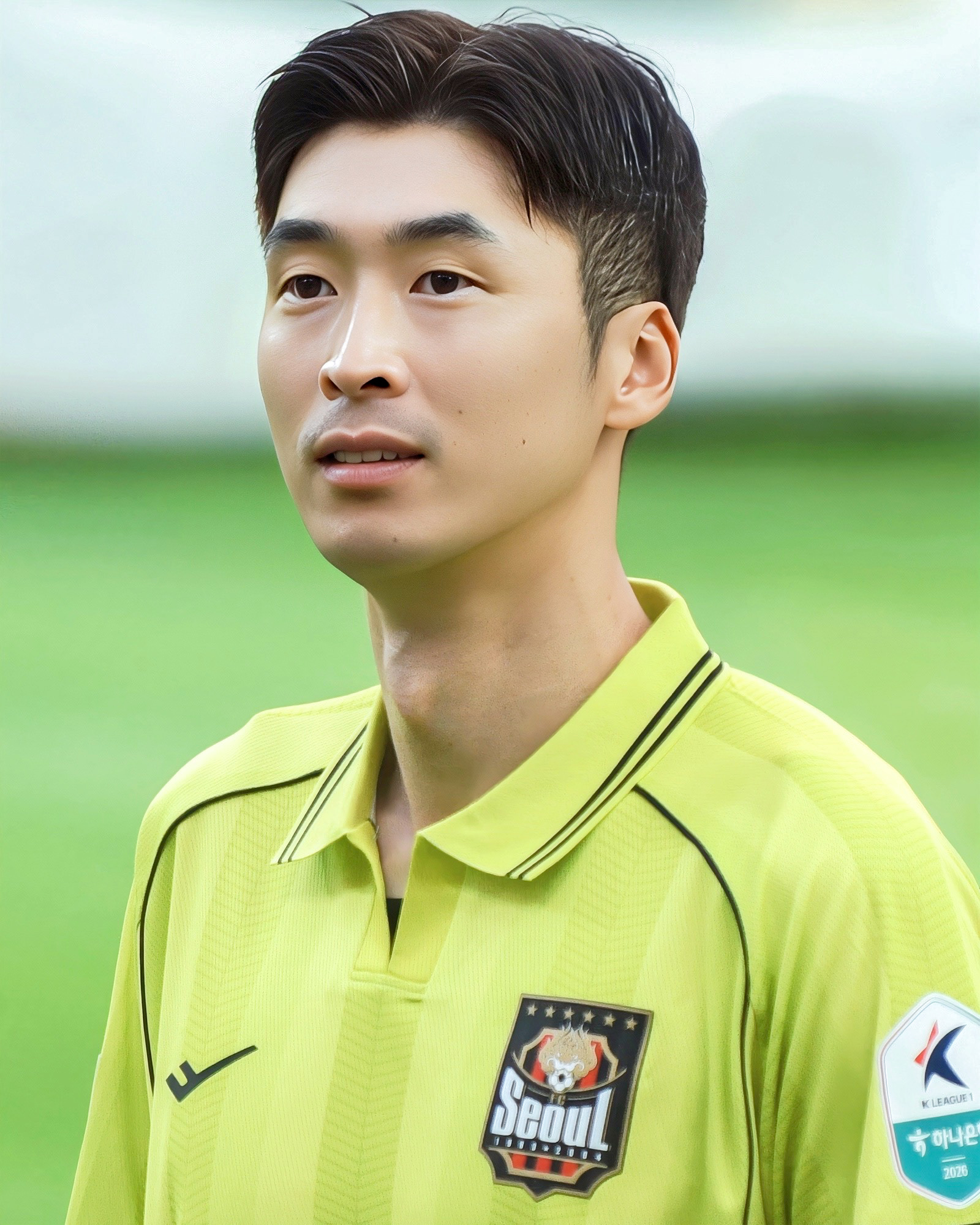
- Yu in 2026

Personal information
- Date of birth: 25 May 1989 (age 37)
- Place of birth: Incheon, South Korea
- Height: 1.94 m (6 ft 4 1/2 in)
- Position: Goalkeeper

Team information
- Current team: Seongnam FC
- Number: 1

Youth career
- 2008–2010: Hongik University

Senior career*
Years	Team	Apps	(Gls)
2011–2021	FC Seoul	112	(0)
2017–2018	→ Sangju Ssangmu (military service)	21	(0)
2022–2023	Gangwon FC	55	(0)
2024–	Seongnam FC	20	(0)
Korean name
Hangul	유상훈
Hanja	柳相勲
RR	Yu Sanghun
MR	Yu Sanghun
- * Club domestic league appearances and goals as of 6 January 2026

Yu Sang-hun (Korean: 유상훈; born 25 May 1989) is a South Korean footballer who plays as a goalkeeper for Seongnam FC.

== Club career ==
In 2011, he joined FC Seoul.

In the 2013 season, he became a second goalkeeper of FC Seoul.

In the 2014 season, he was selected as best player of 2014 AFC Champions League quarter-finals. Especially, in the Quarter-final 2nd leg, he saved three penalties in a shoot-out.

== International career ==
He was in the South Korea national football team in the 2011 Summer Universiade.

== Career statistics ==
=== Club ===
As of 8 October 2023.

Club	Season	League			Cup		Continental		Other		Total	
Club	Season	Division	Apps	Goals	Apps	Goals	Apps	Goals	Apps	Goals	Apps	Goals
FC Seoul	2011	K League 1	1	0	0	0	0	0	—		1	0
FC Seoul	2013	K League 1	3	0	2	0	2	0	—		7	0
FC Seoul	2014	K League 1	15	0	4	0	4	0	—		23	0
FC Seoul	2015	K League 1	27	0	4	0	4	0	—		35	0
FC Seoul	2016	K League 1	21	0	3	0	6	0	—		30	0
FC Seoul	2018	K League 1	1	0	—		—		—		1	0
FC Seoul	2019	K League 1	32	0	1	0	—		—		33	0
FC Seoul	2020	K League 1	11	0	2	0	4	0	—		17	0
FC Seoul	2021	K League 1	2	0	0	0	—		—		2	0
FC Seoul	Total		112	0	16	0	20	0	—		148	0
Sangju Ssangmu (draft)	2017	K League 1	8	0	1	0	—		2	0	11	0
Sangju Ssangmu (draft)	2018	K League 1	13	0	0	0	—		—		13	0
Sangju Ssangmu (draft)	Total		21	0	1	0	—		2	0	24	0
Gangwon FC	2022	K League 1	35	0	2	0	—		—		37	0
Gangwon FC	2023	K League 1	20	0	2	0	—		0	0	22	0
Gangwon FC	Total		55	0	4	0	—		0	0	59	0
Career total			198	0	21	0	20	0	2	0	241	0
