= Ha Dae-sung =

South Korean footballer (born 1985)

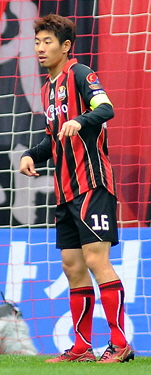
- Ha with FC Seoul in 2013

Personal information
- Date of birth: 2 March 1985 (age 41)
- Place of birth: Incheon, South Korea
- Height: 1.80 m (5 ft 11 in)
- Position: Central midfielder

Team information
- Current team: Liaoning Tieren (assistant coach)

Youth career
- 2001–2003: Bupyeong High School
- 2004–2005: Ulsan Hyundai Horang-i

Senior career*
Years	Team	Apps	(Gls)
2004	Ulsan Hyundai Horang-i	0	(0)
2006–2008	Daegu FC	52	(5)
2009	Jeonbuk Hyundai Motors	26	(1)
2010–2013	FC Seoul	112	(19)
2014–2015	Beijing Guoan	46	(2)
2016	FC Tokyo	3	(0)
2016	FC Tokyo U-23	1	(0)
2016	→ Nagoya Grampus (loan)	9	(1)
2017–2019	FC Seoul	17	(1)
Total		266	(29)

International career
2008–2014	South Korea	13	(0)

Managerial career
- 2022: Gangwon FC Reserve
- 2023–2024: Jeju United (assistant)
- 2024–2025: Chengdu Rongcheng (assistant)
- 2026–: Liaoning Tieren (assistant)
Medal record
Men's football
Representing South Korea
EAFF Championship
Bronze medal – third place	2013 South Korea	Team
- * Club domestic league appearances and goals

- Ha Dae-sung
- Hangul: 하대성
- Hanja: 河大成
- RR: Ha Daeseong
- MR: Ha Taesŏng

Ha Dae-sung (Korean: 하대성; born 2 March 1985) is a South Korean football coach and former football player.

== Early life ==
Ha displayed exceptional footballing talent from early years. In 1997, Ha, who was then attending Incheon Mansoobuk Elementary School, was given the Grand Prize of the Cha Bum-kun Football Awards, which had been established by South Korean legend Cha Bum-kun to discover young talents. His reputation led Bupyeong High School, one of the most famous footballing schools in South Korea, to scout him. However, soon he got a crucial injury on his right knee and had to stop playing football for two years. On his senior year at high school, Ha began to play regularly and helped his school win three national competitions alongside his teammate Lee Keun-ho.

== Club career ==
Ha joined Ulsan Hyundai Horang-i in 2004, but he could not find his place at the club. Having failed at Ulsan, Ha moved to his friend Lee Keun-ho's team Daegu FC in 2006 and made his K League debut. He began to shine with Lee, and Daegu made a sensation in 2008 by playing extremely aggressive football and becoming the joint top-scoring club in the league.

In 2009, Ha moved to Jeonbuk Hyundai Motors. Although Jeonbuk won the league in that season, he failed to secure a regular place in the first team.

Ha moved to FC Seoul in 2010 and helped his club win the league in that season. On 3 January 2012, he was appointed captain of Seoul. After leading Seoul to another league title in 2012, he received interest from various clubs. Dinamo Zagreb reportedly was one of the numerous clubs that made an offer to sign Ha. However, he chose to stay at Seoul. The next year, he was nominated for the Asian Footballer of the Year award after Seoul finished as the runners-up in the 2013 AFC Champions League.

Ha went abroad since 2014 and played in Chinese Super League and J1 League. He returned to Seoul in 2017 and announced his retirement after two years.

== Personal life ==
Ha Dae-sung is a close friend of Lee Keun-ho. The two have known each other since they were 10 and attended the same elementary, middle and high schools.

Ha said that he is exempt from military duty because of an illness he suffered during childhood on a radio show.

His younger brother Ha Sung-min is also a footballer.

== Career statistics ==
=== Club ===
Appearances and goals by club, season and competition
Club	Season	League			National cup		League cup		Continental		Other		Total	
Club	Season	Division	Apps	Goals	Apps	Goals	Apps	Goals	Apps	Goals	Apps	Goals	Apps	Goals
Ulsan Hyundai Horang-i	2004	K League	0	0	?	?	2	0	—		—		2	0
Daegu FC	2006	K League	11	0	?	?	7	0	—		—		18	0
Daegu FC	2007	K League	17	1	?	?	8	1	—		—		25	2
Daegu FC	2008	K League	24	4	?	?	7	1	—		—		31	5
Daegu FC	Total		52	5	?	?	22	2	—		—		74	7
Jeonbuk Hyundai Motors	2009	K League	26	1	?	?	4	1	—		—		30	2
FC Seoul	2010	K League	26	5	2	0	7	3	—		—		35	8
FC Seoul	2011	K League	18	6	2	0	0	0	4	0	—		24	6
FC Seoul	2012	K League	39	5	2	1	—		—		—		41	6
FC Seoul	2013	K League 1	29	3	1	1	—		13	1	—		43	5
FC Seoul	Total		112	19	7	2	7	3	17	1	—		143	25
Beijing Guoan	2014	Chinese Super League	22	1	0	0	—		6	1	—		28	2
Beijing Guoan	2015	Chinese Super League	24	1	1	0	—		5	0	—		30	1
Beijing Guoan	Total		46	2	1	0	—		11	1	—		58	3
FC Tokyo	2016	J1 League	3	0	0	0	0	0	4	0	—		7	0
FC Tokyo U-23	2016	J3 League	1	0	—		—		—		—		1	0
Nagoya Grampus (loan)	2016	J1 League	9	1	0	0	0	0	—		—		9	1
FC Seoul	2017	K League 1	7	1	0	0	—		0	0	—		7	1
FC Seoul	2018	K League 1	8	0	2	0	—		—		2 (Note: Appearances in K League promotion-relegation play-offs)	0	12	0
FC Seoul	2019	K League 1	2	0	0	0	—		—		—		2	0
FC Seoul	Total		17	1	2	0	—		0	0	2	0	21	1
Career total			266	29	10	2	35	6	32	2	2	0	345	39

=== International ===
Appearances and goals by national team and year
National team	Year	Apps	Goals
South Korea	2008	1	0
South Korea	2009	1	0
South Korea	2012	5	0
South Korea	2013	4	0
South Korea	2014	2	0
Career total		13	0

== Honours ==
Jeonbuk Hyundai Motors

- K League 1: 2009

FC Seoul

- K League 1: 2010, 2012
- Korean League Cup: 2010
- AFC Champions League runner-up: 2013

Individual

- K League All-Star: 2010, 2012
- K League 1 Best XI: 2011, 2012, 2013
- Korean FA Goal of the Year: 2013

Sporting positions
Preceded by Park Yong-ho	FC Seoul captain 2012–2013	Succeeded by Kim Jin-kyu
