= 2023 FC Seoul season =

FC Seoul
2023 season
- Chairman: Huh Tae-soo
- Manager: An Ik-soo
- Stadium: Seoul World Cup Stadium
- K League 1: 7th
- Korean FA Cup: Third round
- Top goalscorer: League: All: Na Sang-ho (8 goals)
- Highest home attendance: 45,007 vs Daegu FC (9 April)
- Lowest home attendance: 10,236 vs Gwangju FC (9 May)
- Average home league attendance: 24,069
Home colours	Away colours
- All statistics correct as of 2 December 2023.

The 2023 season was FC Seoul's 40th season in the K League 1. The club also participated in the 2023 edition of the FA Cup, being knocked out on the third round. A defeat in the FA Cup Final and a 9th place finish on 2022 means the club does not participate in the 2023-24 AFC Champions League.

== Pre-season ==
=== Pre-season match results ===
Type	Date	Opponents	Result	Score	Scorers	Notes
Practice matches during winter training spell	13 January 2022	(South Korea) Daejeon Korail FC	D	1–1		
Practice matches during winter training spell	1 February 2022	(South Korea) Hwaseong FC	W	5–0		
Practice matches during winter training spell	4 February 2022	(South Korea) Jeonju University	W	4–3		
Practice matches during winter training spell	4 February 2022	(South Korea) Gangneung FC	W	4–0		
Practice matches during winter training spell	9 February 2022	(South Korea) Chungju Citizen FC	W	5–0		
Practice matches during winter training spell	9 February 2022	(South Korea) Busan IPark	D	1–1		

== Competitions ==
=== Overview ===
Competition	First match	Last match	Starting round	Final position	Record							
Competition	First match	Last match	Starting round	Final position	Pld	W	D	L	GF	GA	GD	Win %
K League 1	25 February	2 December	Matchday 1	7th	38	14	13	11	63	49	+14	36.84
FA Cup	12 April		Third round	–	1	0	1	0	1	1	+0	0.00
Total					39	14	14	11	64	50	+14	35.90

Last updated: 1 July 2023
Source: FC Seoul Official Website

=== K League 1 ===
==== League table ====
Pos	Team	Pld	W	D	L	GF	GA	GD	Pts	Qualification or relegation (Note: Teams played each other three times (33 matches), before the league was split into two groups, the top six and the bottom six.)
5	Incheon United	38	14	14	10	46	42	+4	56	
6	Daegu FC	38	13	14	11	42	43	−1	53	
7	FC Seoul	38	14	13	11	63	49	+14	55	
8	Daejeon Hana Citizen	38	12	15	11	56	58	−2	51	
9	Jeju United	38	10	11	17	43	49	−6	41	

Source: Soccerway, K League
Rules for classification: 1) Points; 2) Goals scored; 3) Goal difference; 4) Wins; 5) Head-to-head points

==== Results summary ====
Overall								Home						Away					
Pld	W	D	L	GF	GA	GD	Pts	W	D	L	GF	GA	GD	W	D	L	GF	GA	GD
38	14	13	11	63	49	+14	55	7	7	5	31	22	+9	7	6	6	32	27	+5

Last updated: 2 December 2023.
Source: Soccerway

==== Matches ====
25 February 1	FC Seoul	2–1	Incheon United	Seoul
16:30 KST	Lim Sang-hyub 29'; Kim Ju-sung 81'	Report	Oh Ban-suk 87'	Stadium: Seoul World Cup Stadium; Attendance: 22,204; Referee: Jeong Dong-sik

5 March 2	Gwangju FC	0–2	FC Seoul	Gwangju
16:30 KST		Report	Osmar 74'; Kim Jin-ya 74'	Stadium: Gwangju Football Stadium; Attendance: 7,357; Referee: Kim Dae-yong

12 March 3	FC Seoul	1–2	Ulsan Hyundai	Seoul
14:00 KST	Na Sang-ho 52'	Report	Joo Min-kyu 54'; Lee Chung-yong 87'	Stadium: Seoul World Cup Stadium; Attendance: 20,549; Referee: Lee Dong-jun

18 March 4	Jeju United	1–2	FC Seoul	Jeju
16:30 KST	Song Ju-hun 92'	Report	Own goal 76'; Aleksandar Paločević 95'	Stadium: Jeju World Cup Stadium; Attendance: 7,357; Referee: Kim Jong-hyeok

1 April 5	Daejeon Hana Citizen	3–2	FC Seoul	Daejeon
19:00 KST	Osmar 14'; Cho Yu-min 20'; Tiago Orobó (yellow card) 40'; Ishida 88'; Cho Yu-min (yellow card) 90+5'	Report	Iljutcenko 24'; Na Sang-ho 50'; Kim Sin-jin (yellow card) 88'	Stadium: Daejeon World Cup Stadium; Attendance: 15,793; Referee: Shin Yeong-jun

8 April 6	FC Seoul	3–0	Daegu FC	Seoul
16:30 KST	Hwang Ui-jo 11'; Na Sang-ho 33'; Paločević (yellow card) 14' (goal) 41'; Kim Ju-sung (yellow card) 67'; Han Chan-hee (yellow card) 71'	Report	Lee Jin-yong (yellow card) 39'; Hwang Jae-won (yellow card) 45+1'; Jo Jin-woo (yellow card) 62'	Stadium: Seoul World Cup Stadium; Attendance: 45,007; Referee: An Jae-hoon

15 April 7	Pohang Steelers	1–1	FC Seoul	Pohang
16:30 KST	Kim In-sung 41'; Grant (yellow card) 62'	Report	Na Sang-ho 2'; Kim Ju-sung (yellow card) 20'; Kwon Wan-kyu (yellow card) 21' (yellow-red card) 85'; Baek Jong-bum (yellow card) 79'	Stadium: Pohang Steel Yard; Attendance: 9,131; Referee: Kim Jong-hyeok

22 April 8	FC Seoul	3–1	Suwon Samsung Bluewings	Seoul
14:00 KST	Paločević (yellow card) 26' (goal) 81'; Na Sang-ho 37'; Hwang Ui-jo 52'; Park Dong-jin (yellow card) 90+4'	Report	Jeong Seong-won (yellow card) 26'; Fejsal Mulić 88'	Stadium: Seoul World Cup Stadium; Attendance: 30,186; Referee: Jeong Dong-sik

26 April 9	Gangwon FC	3–2	FC Seoul	Chuncheon
19:00 KST	Park Sang-hyeok 24'; Jung Seung-yong 45'; Lee Woong-hee 90'	Report	Lim Sang-hyub 52', 68'; Lee Han-beom (yellow card) 77'	Stadium: Chuncheon Songam Sports Town; Attendance: 3,640; Referee: Chae Sang-hyeob

29 April 10	Suwon FC	0–3	FC Seoul	Suwon
14:00 KST		Report	Han Chan-hee 21' (yellow card) 27'; Na Sang-ho 50', 72'; Ki Sung-yueng (yellow card) 74'; Lee Han-beom (yellow card) 77'	Stadium: Suwon Stadium; Attendance: 5,086; Referee: Kim Yong-woo

5 May 11	FC Seoul	1–1	Jeonbuk Hyundai	Seoul
14:00 KST	Lee Tae-seok (yellow card) 48'; Lee Han-beom (yellow card) 69'; Park Dong-jin 77'	Report	Gustavo 1'; Choi Chul-soon (yellow card) 65'; André Luis (yellow card) 90+5'	Stadium: Seoul World Cup Stadium; Attendance: 37,008; Referee: Kim Dae-yong

9 May 12	FC Seoul	3–1	Gwangju FC	Seoul
19:30 KST	Willyan 9'; Na Sang-ho 65'; Park Dong-jin 86'; Kim Sin-jin (yellow card) 90+4'	Report	Jeong Ho-yeon (yellow card) 41'; Heo Yool 50'; Lee Soon-min (yellow card) 73'; Lee Hee-gyun (yellow card) 84'	Stadium: Seoul World Cup Stadium; Attendance: 10,236; Referee: Ko Hyung-jin

14 May 13	Ulsan Hyundai	3–2	FC Seoul	Ulsan
14:30 KST	Ádám 14'; Qazaishvili 48', 67'; Park Yong-woo (yellow card) 85'	Report	Lim Sang-hyub (yellow card) 7'; Kim Sin-jin 46'; Park Soo-il 90+1'	Stadium: Ulsan World Cup Stadium; Attendance: 26,004; Referee: Kim Yong-woo

20 May 14	FC Seoul	1–1	Jeju United	Seoul
18:00 KST	Willyan 83'	Report	Yuri 78'	Stadium: Seoul World Cup Stadium; Attendance: 20,338; Referee: Lee Dong-jun

28 May 15	FC Seoul	1–0	Gangwon FC	Seoul
16:30 KST	Willyan 27'	Report		Stadium: Seoul World Cup Stadium; Attendance: 14,419; Referee: Kim Hee-gon

4 June 16	Daegu FC	1–0	FC Seoul	Daegu
19:00 KST	Cesinha 14'	Report		Stadium: DGB Daegu Bank Park; Attendance: 12,056; Referee: Park Byeon-jin

7 June 17	Incheon United	1–1	FC Seoul	Incheon
19:30 KST	Fernandes 19'	Report	Hwang Ui-jo 52'	Stadium: Incheon World Cup Stadium; Attendance: 7,272; Referee: Kim Dae-yong

11 June 18	FC Seoul	1–1	Pohang Steelers	Seoul
18:00 KST	Hwang Ui-jo 37'	Report	Ha Chang-rae 90+4'	Stadium: Seoul World Cup Stadium; Attendance: 18,108; Referee: Choi Hyun-jai

24 June 19	Suwon Samsung Bluewings	0–1	FC Seoul	Suwon
16:30 KST		Report	Willyan 86'	Stadium: Suwon World Cup Stadium; Attendance: 19,513; Referee: Kim Woo-seong

1 July 20	FC Seoul	0–0	Daejeon Hana Citizen	Seoul
19:30 KST		Report		Stadium: Seoul World Cup Stadium; Attendance: 22,637; Referee: Park Byeong-jin

8 July 21	Jeonbuk Hyundai Motors	–	FC Seoul	Jeonju
19:30 KST				Stadium: Jeonju World Cup Stadium

12 July 22	FC Seoul	–	Suwon FC	Seoul
19:30 KST				Stadium: Seoul World Cup Stadium

15 July 23	Gangwon FC	–	FC Seoul	Gangneung
19:30 KST				Stadium: Gangneung Stadium

22 July 24	FC Seoul	–	Incheon United	Seoul
19:30 KST				Stadium: Seoul World Cup Stadium

4 August 25	FC Seoul	–	Pohang Steelers	Seoul
19:30 KST				Stadium: Seoul World Cup Stadium

13 August 26	Daejeon Hana Citizen	–	FC Seoul	Daejeon
19:00 KST				Stadium: Daejeon World Cup Stadium

19 August 27	FC Seoul	–	Daegu FC	Seoul
19:30 KST				Stadium: Seoul World Cup Stadium

27 August 28	FC Seoul	–	Ulsan Hyundai	Seoul
19:00 KST				Stadium: Seoul World Cup Stadium

2 September 29	Suwon Samsung Bluewings	–	FC Seoul	Suwon
16:30 KST				Stadium: Suwon World Cup Stadium

17 September 30	FC Seoul	–	Gwangju FC	Seoul
14:00 KST				Stadium: Seoul World Cup Stadium

23 September 31	Jeju United	–	FC Seoul	Seogwipo
16:30 KST				Stadium: Jeju World Cup Stadium

30 September 32	Suwon FC	–	FC Seoul	Suwon
14:00 KST				Stadium: Suwon Stadium

8 October 33	FC Seoul	–	Jeonbuk Hyundai Motors	Seoul
15:00 KST				Stadium: Seoul World Cup Stadium

=== FA Cup ===
The club started the competition at the third round, as a non-ACL team from K League 1.

12 April Third round	Gimpo FC	1–1 (a.e.t.) (4–2 p)	FC Seoul	Gimpo
19:00	Ja Yoon-ho 69'		Kang Seong-jin 56'	Stadium: Gimpo Solteo Football Field; Attendance: 3,345; Referee: Kim Do-yeon
	Penalties
	Pablo González (penalty scored); Lee Seong-jae (penalty scored); Son Seok-young (penalty scored); Yoon Min-ho (penalty scored)		(penalty scored) Iljutcenko; (penalty missed) Hwang Hyun-soo; (penalty scored) Park Soo-il; (penalty missed) Lee Seung-jun

== Coaching staff ==
Position	Name	Notes
Manager	(South Korea) An Ik-soo	
Coach	(South Korea) Kim Jin-kyu	
Coach	(South Korea) Kim Myung-gon	
Coach	(South Korea) Cho Seong-rae	
Coach	(South Korea) Kim Young-chul	
Coach	(South Korea) Hwang Eun-chan	
Goalkeeping Coach	(South Korea) Jeon Sang-wook	
Fitness Coach	(South Korea) Jung Hoon-gi	
U-18 Team Manager	(South Korea) Yun Hyun-pil	
U-18 Team Coach	(South Korea) Choi Hyun-tae	
U-18 Team Goalkeeping Coach	(South Korea) Yoo Hyun-wook	
U-18 Team Fitness Coach	(South Korea) Hwang Ji-hwan	
Scout	(South Korea) Lee Won-jun	
Scout	(South Korea) Jung Jae-yoon	

== Players ==
=== Team squad ===
As of 25 March 2023.

- All players registered for the 2023 season are listed.

No.	Pos.	Nationality	Player	Notes
1	GK	South Korea	Baek Jong-bum	
2	DF	South Korea	Hwang Hyun-soo	
3	DF	South Korea	Gwon Wan-gyu	
4	DF	South Korea	Lee Han-beom	
5	MF	Spain	Osmar	
6	MF	South Korea	Ki Sung-yueng	
7	FW	South Korea	Na Sang-ho	
8	MF	South Korea	Lim Min-hyeok	Left mid-season
9	FW	South Korea	Kim Sin-jin	
10	FW	South Korea	Ji Dong-won	
11	FW	South Korea	Kang Seong-jin	
13	MF	South Korea	Go Yo-han	
14	MF	South Korea	Lim Sang-hyub (vice-captain)	
16	FW	South Korea	Hwang Ui-jo	
17	DF	South Korea	Kim Jin-ya (vice-captain)	
18	GK	South Korea	Hwang Sung-min	
19	FW	South Korea	Kim Gyeong-min	
20	DF	South Korea	Kim Hyun-deok	
21	GK	South Korea	Choi Chul-won	
22	DF	South Korea	Lee Si-young	
23	GK	South Korea	Seo Ju-hwan	
24	MF	South Korea	Jung Hyun-cheol	
25	MF	South Korea	Han Chan-hee (vice-captain)	
26	MF	Serbia	Aleksandar Paločević	
28	MF	South Korea	Kim Yeoun-Kyum	
29	MF	South Korea	Kim Jin-sung	
30	DF	South Korea	Kim Ju-sung (vice-captain)	
31	MF	South Korea	Seo Jae-min	
32	DF	South Korea	Cho Young-kwang	
35	MF	South Korea	Paik Sang-hoon	
36	DF	South Korea	Anh Jae-min	
37	FW	South Korea	Son Seung-beom	
39	DF	South Korea	Lee Ji-suk	
40	DF	South Korea	Park Seong-hoon	
42	MF	South Korea	Park Jang Han-gyeol	
47	FW	South Korea	Ahn Gi-hun	Left mid-season
50	FW	South Korea	Park Dong-jin	
66	MF	South Korea	Han Seung-gyu	
72	MF	South Korea	Lee Seung-jun	
73	FW	South Korea	Lee In-gyu	Left mid-season
77	MF	South Korea	Kim Sung-min	
81	MF	South Korea	Hwang Do-yoon	
88	DF	South Korea	Lee Tae-seok	
90	FW	Germany	Stanislav Iljutcenko (captain)	
91	DF	South Korea	Kang Sang-hee	
94	FW	Brazil	Willyan	
96	DF	South Korea	Park Soo-il	
99	FW	Syria	Hosam Aiesh	

=== Out on loan or military service ===
No.	Pos.	Nationality	Player	Loaned to	Loan period
—	DF	South Korea	Lee Sang-min	(South Korea) Gimcheon Sangmu	January 2023–July 2024
—	DF	South Korea	Yoon Jong-gyu	(South Korea) Gimcheon Sangmu	January 2023–July 2024
—	MF	South Korea	Ahn Ji-man	(South Korea) Gimhae FC	January 2023–December 2023
—	MF	South Korea	Cha Oh-yeon	(South Korea) Cheonan City FC	January 2023–December 2023
—	MF	South Korea	Lim Min-hyeok	(South Korea) Busan IPark	February 2023–December 2023
—	FW	South Korea	Cho Young-wook	(South Korea) Gimcheon Sangmu	January 2023–July 2024
—	FW	South Korea	Jung Han-min	(South Korea) Seongnam FC	January 2023–December 2023
—	FW	South Korea	Lee Seung-jae	(South Korea) Chungbuk Cheongju FC	January 2023–December 2023
—	FW	South Korea	Kwon Sung-yun	(South Korea) Daejeon Korail FC	February 2023–December 2023

== Goalscorers ==
Updated as of 1 July 2023.

Rank	Pos.	No.	Player	K League 1	FA Cup	Total
1	FW	7	(South Korea) Na Sang-ho	8	0	8
1	FW	16	(South Korea) Hwang Ui-jo	4	0	4
1	FW	94	(Brazil) Willyan	4	0	4
4	MF	14	(South Korea) Lim Sang-hyub	3	0	3
4	MF	26	(Serbia) Aleksandar Paločević	3	0	3
6	DF	5	(Spain) Osmar	2	0	2
6	FW	50	(South Korea) Park Dong-jin	2	0	2
8	FW	9	(South Korea) Kim Sin-jin	1	0	1
8	DF	17	(South Korea) Kim Jin-ya	1	0	1
8	MF	25	(South Korea) Han Chan-hee	1	0	1
8	DF	30	(South Korea) Kim Ju-sung	1	0	1
8	FW	90	(Germany) Stanislav Iljutcenko	1	0	1
8	DF	96	(South Korea) Park Soo-il	1	0	1
8	FW	11	(South Korea) Kang Seong-jin	0	1	1
Total				32	1	33

== See also ==
- FC Seoul
