= 2022 FC Seoul season =

FC Seoul
2022 season
- Chairman: Huh Tae-soo
- Manager: An Ik-soo
- Stadium: Seoul World Cup Stadium
- K League 1: 9th
- Korean FA Cup: Runners-up
- Highest home attendance: 16,333 (vs Suwon Bluewings, 4 Sep)
- Lowest home attendance: 3,792 (vs Gangwon, 6 Apr)
Home colours	Away colours

The 2022 season was FC Seoul's 39th season in the K League 1. For the 3rd consecutive season, FC Seoul wasn't able to end the K League 1 at the Championship Round, leaving them a K League 1 Relegation Round spot. They finished in 9th place, escaping relegation play-offs at their last match, after winning 2–0 past Suwon FC. They didn't participated —or qualified to participate—in the 2022 AFC Champions League. Their final chance of reaching the 2023–24 AFC Champions League was via the 2022 Korean FA Cup, where they played a two-legged final against Jeonbuk Hyundai Motors, losing on aggregate score. Overall, no titles were won by FC Seoul in the season.

== Pre-season ==
- First Winter Training Camp: In Namhae County, South Gyeongsang Province, South Korea - From 1 January 2022 to 25 January 2022
- Second Winter Training Camp: In Geoje and South Gyeongsang Province, South Korea - From 29 January 2022 to 6 February 2022
- Third Winter Training Camp: In Yeongdeok County and North Gyeongsang Province, South Korea - From 7 February 2022 to 11 February 2022

=== Pre-season match results ===
Type	Date	Opponents	Result	Score	Scorers	Notes
Practice matches during winter training spell	13 January 2022	(South Korea) Daejeon Korail FC	D	1–1		
Practice matches during winter training spell	1 February 2022	(South Korea) Hwaseong FC	W	5–0		
Practice matches during winter training spell	4 February 2022	(South Korea) Jeonju University	W	4–3		
Practice matches during winter training spell	4 February 2022	(South Korea) Gangneung FC	W	4–0		
Practice matches during winter training spell	9 February 2022	(South Korea) Chungju Citizen FC	W	5–0		
Practice matches during winter training spell	9 February 2022	(South Korea) Busan IPark	D	1–1		

== Competitions ==
=== Overview ===
Competition	First match	Last match	Starting round	Final position	Record							
Competition	First match	Last match	Starting round	Final position	Pld	W	D	L	GF	GA	GD	Win %
K League 1	19 February	22 October	Matchday 1	9th	38	11	13	14	43	47	−4	28.95
FA Cup	27 April	30 October	Round 3	Runners-up	6	4	1	1	10	6	+4	66.67
Total					44	15	14	15	53	53	+0	34.09

Last updated: complete
Source: FC Seoul Official Website

=== K League 1 ===
==== Results summary ====
Overall								Home						Away					
Pld	W	D	L	GF	GA	GD	Pts	W	D	L	GF	GA	GD	W	D	L	GF	GA	GD
38	11	13	14	43	47	−4	46	6	5	8	24	25	−1	5	8	6	19	22	−3

Last updated: complete.
Source: soccerway

==== Results by round ====
Round	1	2	3	4	5	6	7	8	9	10	11	12	13	14	15	16	17	18	19	20	21	22	23	24	25	26	27	28	29	30	31	32	33	34	35	36	37	38
Ground	A	H	A	A	H	A	H	A	H	H	A	A	H	A	H	A	A	H	A	H	A	H	A	H	A	A	H	A	H	A	H	H	A	H	A	H	H	A
Result	L	W	L	W	W	W	L	L	L	L	L	D	D	D	L	D	D	D	D	L	L	W	L	W	W	D	L	W	L	D	D	W	L	L	D	D	L	W

Source: K League
A = Away; H = Home; W = Win; D = Draw; L = Loss

==== Matches ====
19 February 2022 1	Daegu FC	0–2	Seoul	Daegu
16:30			Cho Young-wook 24'; Na Sang-ho 81'	Stadium: DGB Daegu Bank Park; Attendance: 8,082; Referee: Kang Dong-ho

26 February 2022 2	Incheon United	1–1	Seoul	Incheon
13:00 KST	Ki Sung-yueng 19' (o.g.)	Report	Kim Jin-ya 74'	Stadium: Incheon Football Stadium; Attendance: 4,618; Referee: Kim Dong-jin

1 March 2022 3	Seongnam	0–0	Seoul	Seongnam
15:30 KST		Report		Stadium: Tancheon Sports Complex; Attendance: 2,393; Referee: Chae Sang-Hyeop

6 March 2022 4	Gimcheon Sangmu	2–0	Seoul	Gimcheon
13:00 KST	Cho Gue-sung 59', 71'	Report		Stadium: Gimcheon Stadium; Attendance: 1,552; Referee: Ko Hyung-jin

11 March 2022 5	Ulsan	2–1	Seoul	Ulsan
18:00 KST	Um Won-sang 60'; Leonardo 90' (pen.)	Report	Cho Young-wook 5'	Stadium: Ulsan Munsu Football Stadium; Attendance: 3,452; Referee: Kim Hee-gon

19 March 2022 6	Seoul	1–2	Jeju United	Seoul
15:30 KST	Park Ho-min 89'	Report	Ring 11', 26'	Stadium: Seoul World Cup Stadium; Attendance: 6,276; Referee: Kim Jong-hyeok

3 April 2022 7	Pohang Steelers	1–1	Seoul	Pohang
16:30 KST	Lee Gwang-hyeok 18'	Report	Na Sang-ho 81' (pen.)	Stadium: Pohang Steel Yard; Attendance: 5,815; Referee: Park Byung-Jin

6 April 2022 8	Seoul	2–2	Gangwon	Seoul
19:30 KST	Na Sang-ho 68' (pen.); Han Seung-gyu 76'	Report	Kim Dae-won 26', 57' (pen.)	Stadium: Seoul World Cup Stadium; Attendance: 3,792; Referee: Kim Yong-Woo

10 April 2022 9	Seoul	2–0	Suwon Bluewings	Seoul
19:00 KST	Paločević 80'; Na Sang-ho 90+2' (pen.)	Report		Stadium: Seoul World Cup Stadium; Attendance: 14,625; Referee: Lee Dong-jun

5 May 2022 10	Jeonbuk Motors	1–1	Seoul	Jeonju
14:00 KST	Ryu Jae-moon 63'	Report	Park Dong-jin 90'	Stadium: Jeonju World Cup Stadium; Attendance: 12,024; Referee: Kim Dong-jin

8 May 2022 11	Seoul	3–1	Suwon	Seoul
16:30 KST	Osmar 62'; Kim Sin-jin 78'; Yoon Jong-gyu 82'	Report	Kim Seung-jun 67'	Stadium: Seoul World Cup Stadium; Attendance: 12,790; Referee: Lee Dong-jun

15 May 2022 12	Seoul	1–0	Pohang Steelers	Seoul
19:00 KST	Na Sang-ho 78'	Report		Stadium: Seoul World Cup Stadium; Attendance: 8,610; Referee: Kim Yong-Woo

18 May 2022 13	Gangwon	1–0	Seoul	Gangneung
19:30 KST	Hwang Mun-ki 30'	Report		Stadium: Gangneung Stadium; Referee: Ahn Jae-Hoon

21 May 2022 14	Seoul	0–1	Seongnam	Seoul
16:30 KST		Report	Goo Bon-cheul 23'	Stadium: Seoul World Cup Stadium; Attendance: 9,247; Referee: Kim Woo-sung

28 May 2022 15	Seoul	2–2	Gimcheon Sangmu	Seoul
16:30 KST	Paločević 23'; Lee Sang-min 83'	Report	Cho Gue-sung 54'; Jung Seung-hyun 90+2'	Stadium: Seoul World Cup Stadium; Attendance: 8,211; Referee: Jeong Dong-sik

19 June 2022 16	Suwon Bluewings	0–1	Seoul	Suwon
19:30 KST		Report	Cho Young-wook 58'	Stadium: Suwon World Cup Stadium; Attendance: 12,922; Referee: Ko Hyung-jin

22 June 2022 17	Seoul	1–2	Ulsan	Seoul
19:30 KST	Paločević 6'	Report	Qazaishvili 76'; Um Won-sang 88'	Stadium: Seoul World Cup Stadium; Attendance: 8,523; Referee: Kim Dae-yong

25 June 2022 18	Seoul	1–1	Incheon United	Seoul
20:00 KST	Cho Young-wook 36'	Report	Lee Myung-joo 71'	Stadium: Seoul World Cup Stadium; Attendance: 10,787; Referee: Kim Hee-gon

2 July 2022 19	Jeju United	2–2	Seoul	Seogwipo
18:00 KST	Gerso 6'; Kim Bong-soo 26'	Report	Jung Han-min 36'; Kang Seong-jin 64'	Stadium: Jeju World Cup Stadium

6 July 2022 20	Seoul	0–1	Jeonbuk Hyundai Motors	Seoul
19:30 KST		Report	Gustavo 54'	Stadium: Seoul World Cup Stadium; Attendance: 8,537; Referee: Kang Dong-ho

10 July 2022 21	Suwon FC	4–3	Seoul	Suwon
19:00 KST	Lee Seung-woo 53'; Veldwijk 71'; Kim Seung-jun 74'; Jeong Jae-yong 90+4'	Report	Park Dong-jin 3'; Kim Sin-jin 50'; Lee Han-beom 90+2'	Stadium: Suwon Sports Complex; Attendance: 4,783; Referee: Seong Ju-gyeong

16 July 2022 22	Seoul	2–1	Daegu	Seoul
20:00 KST	Na Sang-ho 64' (pen.); Iljutcenko 90+6'	Report	Go Jae-hyun 54'	Stadium: Seoul World Cup Stadium; Attendance: 8,846; Referee: Kim Ji-wook

30 July 2022 25	Pohang Steelers	1–2	Seoul	Pohang
19:30 KST	Heo Yong-joon 27'	Report	Ko Kwang-min 66'; Na Sang-ho 82' (pen.)	Stadium: Pohang Steel Yard; Attendance: 6,355; Referee: Cheon Jin-hwi

2 August 2022 26	Ulsan Hyundai	1–1	Seoul	Ulsan
20:00 KST	Qazaishvili 58'	Report	Iljutcenko 50'	Stadium: Ulsan World Cup Stadium; Attendance: 6,682; Referee: Yang Jae-woong

5 August 2022 27	Seoul	0–2	Jeju United	Seoul
19:30 KST		Report	Kim Ju-kong 51'; Gerso 68'	Stadium: Seoul World Cup Stadium; Attendance: 7,583; Referee: Song Bong-geun

15 August 2022 28	Gimcheon Sangmu	1–2	Seoul	Gimcheon
19:00 KST	Kim Gyeong-min 34'	Report	Cho Young-wook 60'; Palocevic 67'	Stadium: Gimcheon Sports Town; Attendance: 2,037; Referee: Park Gyun-wong

21 August 2022 24	Seoul	2–0	Seongnam	Seoul
18:00 KST	Iljutcenko 74', 83'	Report		Stadium: Seoul World Cup Stadium; Attendance: 7,755; Referee: Jang Jong-pil

27 August 2022 23	Incheon United	2–0	Seoul	Incheon
20:00 KST	Hernandes 27'; Kim Do-hyuk 54'	Report		Stadium: Incheon Football Stadium; Attendance: 10,139; Referee: Kang Dong-ho

4 September 2022 29	Seoul	1–3	Suwon Samsung Bluewings	Seoul
16:30 KST	Iljutcenko 90'	Report	Oh Hyung-yu 28', 64'; An Byong-jun 32'	Stadium: Seoul World Cup Stadium; Attendance: 16,333; Referee: Kim Ji-wook

7 September 2022 30	Jeonbuk Hyundai Motors	0–0	Seoul	Jeonju
19:00 KST		Report		Stadium: Jeonju World Cup Stadium; Attendance: 4,121; Referee: Park Sang-jun

10 September 2022 31	Seoul	2–2	Suwon FC	Seoul
19:00 KST	Park Dong-jin 35'; Iljutcenko 45+1'	Report	Jeong Dong-ho 42'; Kim Hyun 90+4'	Stadium: Seoul World Cup Stadium; Attendance: 10,265; Referee: Song Beum-geun

13 September 2022 32	Seoul	1–0	Gangwon	Seoul
19:30 KST	Cho Young-wook 74'	Report		Stadium: Seoul World Cup Stadium; Attendance: 5,349; Referee: Bang Gee-yeol

18 September 2022 33	Daegu	3–0	Seoul	Seoul
15:00 KST	Go Jae-hyun 43'; Cesinha 45+1'; Lee Keun-ho 69'	Report		Stadium: Seoul World Cup Stadium; Attendance: 9,330; Referee: Seong Ju-gyeong

1 October 2022 34	Seoul	2–3	Daegu	Daegu
14:00 KST	Palocevic 56'; Iljutcenko 80'	Report	Cesinha 38', 60'; Zeca 67'	Stadium: DGB Daegu Bank Park; Attendance: 7,805; Referee: Kang Dong-ho

9 October 2022 35	Suwon Samsung Bluewings	0–0	Seoul	Suwon
14:00 KST		Report		Stadium: Suwon World Cup Stadium; Attendance: 10,810; Referee: Kim Jong-hyeok

12 October 2022 36	Seoul	1–1	Gimcheon Sangmu	Seoul
19:30 KST	Kim Sin-jin 1'	Report	Lee Yeong-jae 61'	Stadium: Seoul World Cup Stadium; Attendance: 4,318; Referee: Park Byung-jin

16 October 2022 37	Seoul	0–1	Seongnam	Seoul
19:00 KST		Report	Mulić 80'	Stadium: Seoul World Cup Stadium; Attendance: 7,282; Referee: Shin Yong-jun

22 October 2022 38	Suwon FC	0–2	Seoul	Suwon
15:00 KST		Report	Na Sang-ho 25'; Jung Han-min 88'	Stadium: Suwon Sports Complex; Attendance: 6,452; Referee: Kim Jung-hyeok

=== FA Cup ===
27 April 2022 Third Round	Changwon City	0–0 (a.e.t.) (3–4 p)	Seoul	Changwon
19:00 KST		Report		Stadium: Changwon Stadium

25 May 2022 Round of 16	Seoul	3–1	Jeju United	Seoul
19:30 KST	Paločević 55' 78'; Cho Young-wook 56'	Report	Joo Min-kyu 24'	Stadium: Seoul World Cup Stadium; Attendance: 555; Referee: Ko Hyung-jin

29 June 2022 Quarter-finals	Busan Transportation Corporation	0–3	Seoul	Busan
19:00 KST		Report	Paločević 26'; Park Dong-jin 46'; Kim Sin-jin 85'	Stadium: Busan Asiad Main Stadium; Attendance: 461; Referee: Song Min-seok

5 October 2022 Semi-finals	Daegu	0–1 (a.e.t.)	Seoul	Daegu
19:00 KST			Na Sang-ho 120+1'	Stadium: DGB Daegu Bank Park; Attendance: 5,433; Referee: Ko Hyung-jin

27 October 2022 Final 1st Leg	Seoul	2–2	Jeonbuk Hyundai Motors	Seoul
19:00 KST	Ki Sung-yueng 3'; Cho Young-wook 38'	Report	Barrow 43'; Cho Gue-sung 45+2'	Stadium: Seoul World Cup Stadium; Attendance: 14,705; Referee: Jeong Dong-sik

30 October 2022 Final 2nd Leg	Jeonbuk Hyundai Motors	3–1	Seoul	Jeonju
13:00 KST	Barrow 11'; Cho Gue-sung 45+1', 90'		Park Dong-jin 69'	Stadium: Jeonju World Cup Stadium

== Coaching staff ==
Position	Name	Notes
Manager	(South Korea) An Ik-soo	
Assistant manager	(South Korea) Park Hyuk-soon	
Coach	(South Korea) Kim Jin-kyu	
Coach	(South Korea) Kim Sun-ho	(21 June 2022–)
Coach	(South Korea) Kim Myung-gon	(22 June 2022– )
Goalkeeping coach	(South Korea) Jeon Sang-wook	
Fitness coach	(South Korea) Hwang Ji-hwan	
U-18 Team Manager	(South Korea) Kim Pil-jong	
U-18 Team Coach	(South Korea) Choi Hyun-tae	
U-18 Team Goalkeeping Coach	(South Korea) Yoo Hyun-wook	
U-18 Team Fitness Coach	(South Korea) Jung Hoon-gi	
U-15 Team Manager	(South Korea) Yoon Si-ho	
U-15 Team Coach	(South Korea) Yoon Hyun-pil	
U-15 Team Coach	(South Korea) Huh Jae-won	
U-15 Team Goalkeeping Coach	(South Korea) Bagn Hyung-gon	
U-15 Team Fitness Coach	(South Korea) So Ki-dong	
U-12 Team Coach	(South Korea) Seo Ki-man	
Scout	(South Korea) Lee Won-jun	
Scout	(South Korea) Jung Jae-yoon	

== Players ==
=== Team squad ===
- All players registered for the 2022 season are listed.

As of 8 September 2022

No.	Pos.	Nationality	Player	Notes
1	GK	South Korea	Baek Jong-bum	
2	DF	South Korea	Hwang Hyun-soo	
3	DF	South Korea	Lee Sang-min	
5	DF	Spain	Osmar	
6	MF	South Korea	Ki Sung-yueng (captain)	
7	FW	South Korea	Na Sang-ho (vice-captain)	
8	MF	South Korea	Lim Min-hyeok	
9	FW	South Korea	Kim Sin-jin	
10	FW	South Korea	Ji Dong-won	
11	FW	South Korea	Cho Young-wook	
13	MF	South Korea	Go Yo-han	
14	FW	Australia	Ben Halloran	Left mid-season
14	MF	Japan	Keijiro Ogawa	Signed mid-season
15	FW	South Korea	Son Ho-jun	
16	MF	South Korea	Jung Won-jin	Left mid-season
16	MF	South Korea	Jung Hyun-cheol	Signed mid-season
17	DF	South Korea	Kim Jin-ya	
18	GK	South Korea	Hwang Sung-min	
19	FW	South Korea	Jung Han-min	
20	DF	South Korea	Lee Han-beom	
21	GK	South Korea	Yang Han-been (vice-captain)	
22	FW	South Korea	Park Jung-bin	Left mid-season
23	DF	South Korea	Yoon Jong-gyu	
24	FW	South Korea	Kwon Sung-yun	
25	MF	South Korea	Ahn Ji-man	
26	MF	Serbia	Aleksandar Paločević	
27	DF	South Korea	Ko Kwang-min	
28	DF	South Korea	Kang Sang-hee	
29	FW	South Korea	Kang Seong-jin	
30	MF	South Korea	Kim Jin-sung	Left mid-season
30	DF	South Korea	Kim Ju-sung	Signed mid-season
31	MF	South Korea	Seo Jae-min	
33	MF	South Korea	Yang Yu-min	
35	MF	South Korea	Paik Sang-hoon	
39	FW	South Korea	Ahn Gi-hun	
40	DF	South Korea	Park Seong-hoon	
41	GK	South Korea	Seo Ju-hwan	Signed mid-season
42	MF	South Korea	Park Jang Han-gyeol	
44	MF	South Korea	Cho Ji-hun	
45	DF	Brazil	Ricardo	Left mid-season
47	MF	South Korea	Kim Woo-hong	Signed mid-season
50	FW	South Korea	Park Dong-jin	
61	MF	South Korea	Han Seung-gyu	
66	MF	South Korea	Cha Oh-yeon	
77	FW	South Korea	Lee Seung-jae	Left mid-season
88	DF	South Korea	Lee Tae-seok	
90	FW	Russia	Stanislav Iljutcenko	Signed mid-season
91	GK	South Korea	Jung Jin-wook	Left mid-season
96	MF	South Korea	Hwang In-beom	Left mid-season
99	FW	South Korea	Park Ho-min	

=== Out on loan and military service ===
No.	Pos.	Nationality	Player	Moving To	Loan Period
—	FW	South Korea	Kim Woo-hong	(South Korea) FC Namdong	July 2020–September 2022 (returned)
—	DF	South Korea	Kim Ju-sung	(South Korea) Gimcheon Sangmu	March 2021–September 2022 (returned)
—	MF	South Korea	Jung Hyun-cheol	(South Korea) Gimcheon Sangmu	March 2021–September 2022 (returned)
—	MF	South Korea	Han Chan-hee	(South Korea) Gimcheon Sangmu	June 2021–December 2022
—	FW	South Korea	Lee In-gyu	(South Korea) Hwaseong FC	February 2022–December 2022
—	FW	South Korea	Lee Seung-jae	(South Korea) Chungnam Asan FC	July 2022–December 2022
—	MF	South Korea	Kim Jin-sung	(South Korea) Cheonan City FC	July 2022–December 2022

== Transfers ==
=== In ===
No.	Pos	Player	Transferred from	Transferred on
18	GK	(South Korea) Hwang Sung-min	(South Korea) Gyeongnam FC	January
91	GK	(South Korea) Jung Jin-wook	(South Korea) Gimhae FC	January
3	DF	(South Korea) Lee Sang-min	(South Korea) Seoul E-Land	January
40	DF	(South Korea) Park Seong-hoon	(South Korea) FC Seoul U-18	January
8	MF	(South Korea) Lim Min-hyeok	(South Korea) Gyeongnam FC	January
25	MF	(South Korea) Ahn Ji-man	(South Korea) FC Seoul U-18	January
44	MF	(South Korea) Cho Ji-hun	(Thailand) Chiangrai United	January
9	FW	(South Korea) Kim Sin-jin	(South Korea) Sunmoon University	January
99	FW	(South Korea) Park Ho-min	(South Korea) Korea University	January
77	FW	(South Korea) Lee Seung-jae	(South Korea) Chungnam Asan	January
40	FW	(South Korea) Park Seong-hoon	(South Korea) FC Seoul U-18	January
45	DF	(Brazil) Ricardo	(Brazil) América-MG	February
31	MF	(South Korea) Seo Jae-min	(South Korea) FC Seoul U-18	March
61	MF	(South Korea) Han Seung-gyu	(South Korea) Jeonbuk Hyundai Motors	April
96	MF	(South Korea) Hwang In-beom	(Russia) Rubin Kazan	May
41	GK	(South Korea) Seo Ju-hwan	(South Korea) Ulsan Hyundai	July
14	MF	(Japan) Keijiro Ogawa	(Japan) Yokohama FC	July
90	FW	(Germany) Stanislav Iljutcenko	(South Korea) FC Seoul U-18	July
30	DF	(South Korea) Kim Ju-sung	(South Korea) Gimcheon Sangmu	September
16	MF	(South Korea) Jung Hyung-cheol	(South Korea) Gimcheon Sangmu	September
–	MF	(South Korea) Han Chan-hee	(South Korea) Gimcheon Sangmu	December

=== Out ===
No.	Pos	Player	Transferred to	Transferred on
–	GK	(South Korea) Yu Sang-hun	(South Korea) Gangwon FC	January
–	DF	(South Korea) Kim Won-gun	(South Korea) Gangwon FC	January
–	MF	(South Korea) Shin Jae-won	(South Korea) Suwon FC	January
–	MF	(South Korea) Yeo Reum	(South Korea) Incheon United	January
–	FW	(South Korea) Hwang Sung-min	(South Korea) Gyeongnam FC	January
–	FW	(Brazil) Gabriel Barbosa	(Brazil) Palmeiras	January
–	GK	(South Korea) Park Chu-young	(South Korea) Ulsan Hyundai	January
–	FW	(South Korea) Lee In-gyu	(South Korea) Hwaseong FC	February
22	FW	(South Korea) Park Jung-bin	Free agent	May
91	GK	(South Korea) Jung Jin-wook	(South Korea) Cheongju FC	June
96	MF	(South Korea) Hwang In-beom	(Russia) Rubin Kazan	June
45	DF	(Brazil) Ricardo	(Brazil) América-MG	July
16	MF	(South Korea) Jung Won-jin	(South Korea) Busan IPark	July
30	MF	(South Korea) Kim Jin-sung	(South Korea) Cheonan City	July
77	FW	(South Korea) Lee Seung-jae	(South Korea) Chungnam Asan	July
14	FW	(Australia) Ben Halloran	(Australia) Adelaide United	May

== See also ==
- FC Seoul
