= Kim Ju-seong =

Kim Ju-seong, Kim Ju-sung, Kim Ju-sŏng, Kim Joo-sung, (김주성) may refer to:

- Kim Joo-sung (born 1966), South Korean footballer
- Kim Joo-sung (basketball) (born 1979), South Korean basketball player
- Kim Ju-song (born 1993), North Korean footballer
- Kim Ju-sung (born 2000), South Korean footballer
