= Park Seong-hoon (footballer) =

South Korean footballer (born 2003)

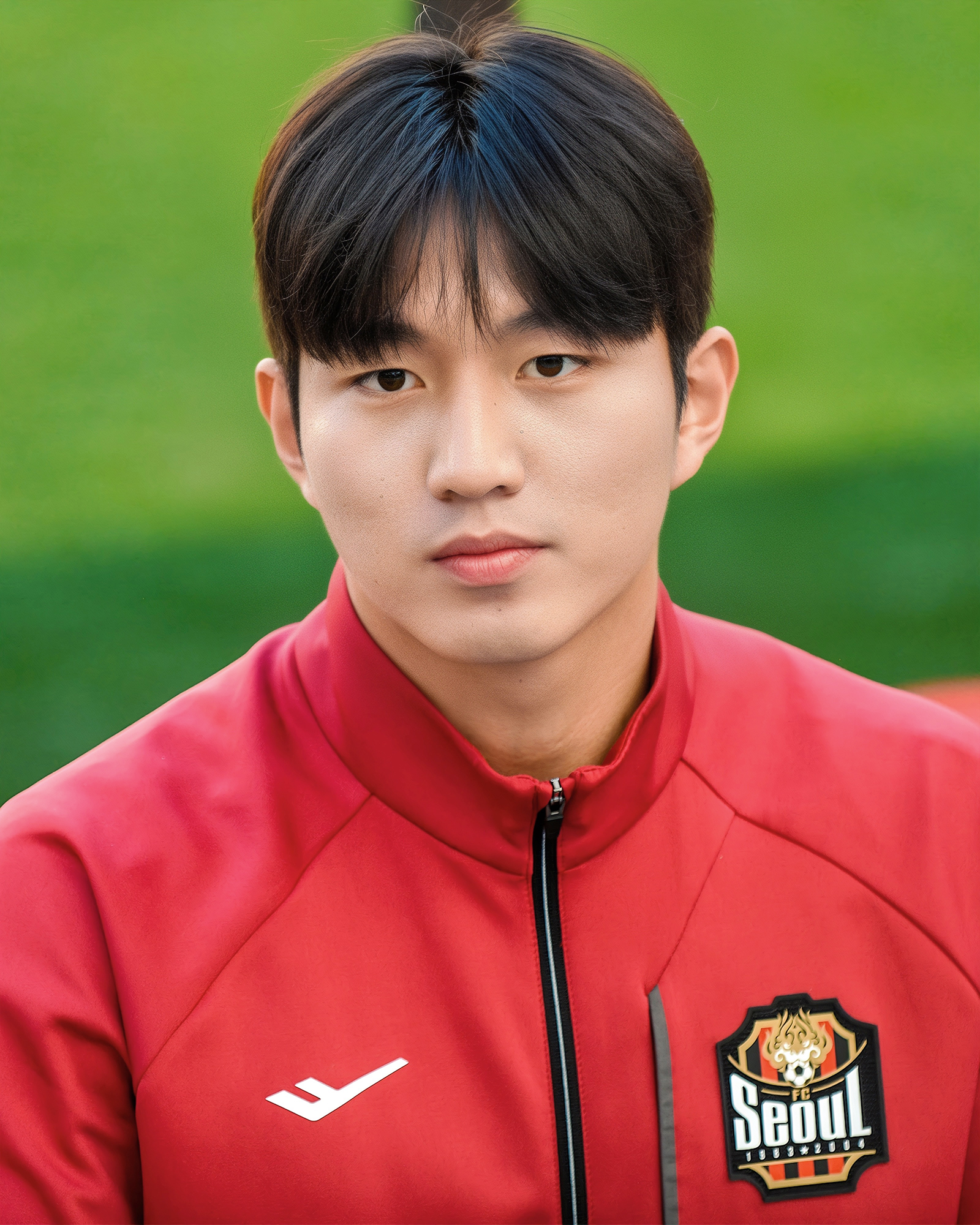
- Park in 2026

Personal information
- Date of birth: January 27, 2003 (age 23)
- Place of birth: South Korea
- Height: 1.83 m (6 ft 0 in)
- Position: Central defender

Team information
- Current team: FC Seoul
- Number: 40

Youth career
- 2016–2018: Osan Middle School (youth)
- 2019–2021: Osan High School (youth)

Senior career*
Years	Team	Apps	(Gls)
2022–	FC Seoul	41	(2)

International career^{‡}
2016	South Korea U14	4	(0)
2018–2020	South Korea U17	5	(0)
2025–	South Korea U23	7	(0)
Medal record
Men's football
Representing South Korea
Asian Games
Gold medal – first place	2026 Aichi–Nagoya
- * Club domestic league appearances and goals as of September 5, 2026 ‡ National team caps and goals as of September 25, 2026

- Park Seong-hoon
- Hangul: 박성훈
- Hanja: 朴聲勳
- RR: Bak Seonghun
- MR: Pak Sŏnghun

Park Seong-hoon (Korean: 박성훈; born January 27, 2003) is a South Korean professional footballer who plays as a central defender for K League 1 club FC Seoul. He trained in the club's youth system, serving as captain for its U-18 youth team. He made his debut appearance in the 2022 K League 1 season. After limited appearances in his first two seasons, Park became a regular starter in 2024, scoring his first league goal.

== Early life and youth career ==
Park Seong-hoon was born on January 27, 2003. He enrolled at Osan Middle School and played for the FC Seoul U-15 Team. He continued his education at Osan High School, playing for the FC Seoul U-18 Team and serving as captain of the squad.

== Senior career ==
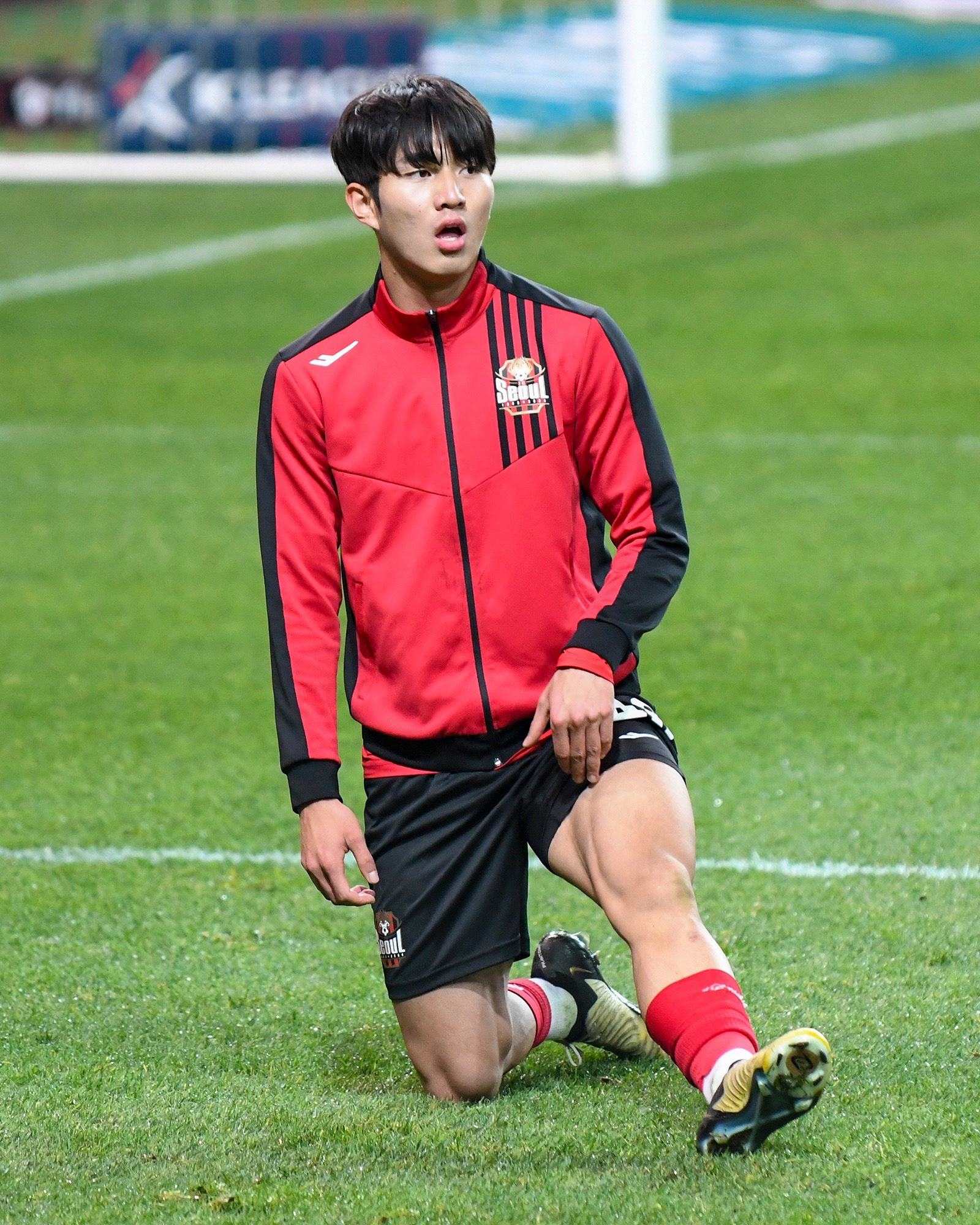
Park in 2024

In 2022, Park signed a professional contract with K League 1 club FC Seoul. He received few opportunities to play with the squad, making a single appearance in each of his first two seasons with the team; he was characterized as a "backup centre-back" at the time.

Beginning in 2024, Park's playing time increased due to the absence of defender Kim Ju-sung, who had sustained an injury earlier in the season, and Rebin Sulaka's departure from the team. In June, Park scored his debut goal, contributing to FC Seoul's 3–0 victory against Suwon FC. Writing for football magazine FourFourTwo, Oh Jong-hyeon designated him as the standout player of the match for his performance in both offense and defense. Park was declared the Man of the Match by the K League, rating his performance 8.3 points out of ten. He appeared in the starting lineup in eleven of his twelve appearances in the season.

Following Kim's return in the 2025 season and being pattered with Yazan Al-Arab, Park was principally been used a substitute. He scored his second league goal during a match in July against Jeju SK FC.

== International career ==
In 2018, Park was called up to the South Korea national under-17 football team. As of 2025, he is a member of the under-23 team.

== Style of play ==
Park plays as a central defender. He has been noted for his "remarkable" positional awareness and ability to handle the ball.

== Career statistics ==
As of match played October 14, 2026

Appearances and goals by club, season and competition
Club	Season	League			Korea Cup		Continental		Other		Total	
Club	Season	Division	Apps	Goals	Apps	Goals	Apps	Goals	Apps	Goals	Apps	Goals
FC Seoul	2022	K League 1	1	0	0	0	—		0	0	1	0
FC Seoul	2023	K League 1	1	0	1	0	—		0	0	2	0
FC Seoul	2024	K League 1	12	1	2	0	—		0	0	14	1
FC Seoul	2025	K League 1	15	1	1	0	5 (Note: Appearances in AFC Champions League Elite)	0	0	0	21	1
FC Seoul	2026	K League 1	12	0	1	0	5 (Note: Four appearances in AFC Champions League Elite, one appearance in AFC Champions League Two)	0	0	0	18	0
Career total			41	2	5	0	10	0	0	0	56	2

== Honours ==
FC Seoul

- K League 1: 2026

South Korea U23

- Asian Games: 2026
