= Paik Sang-hoon =

South Korean footballer (born 2002)

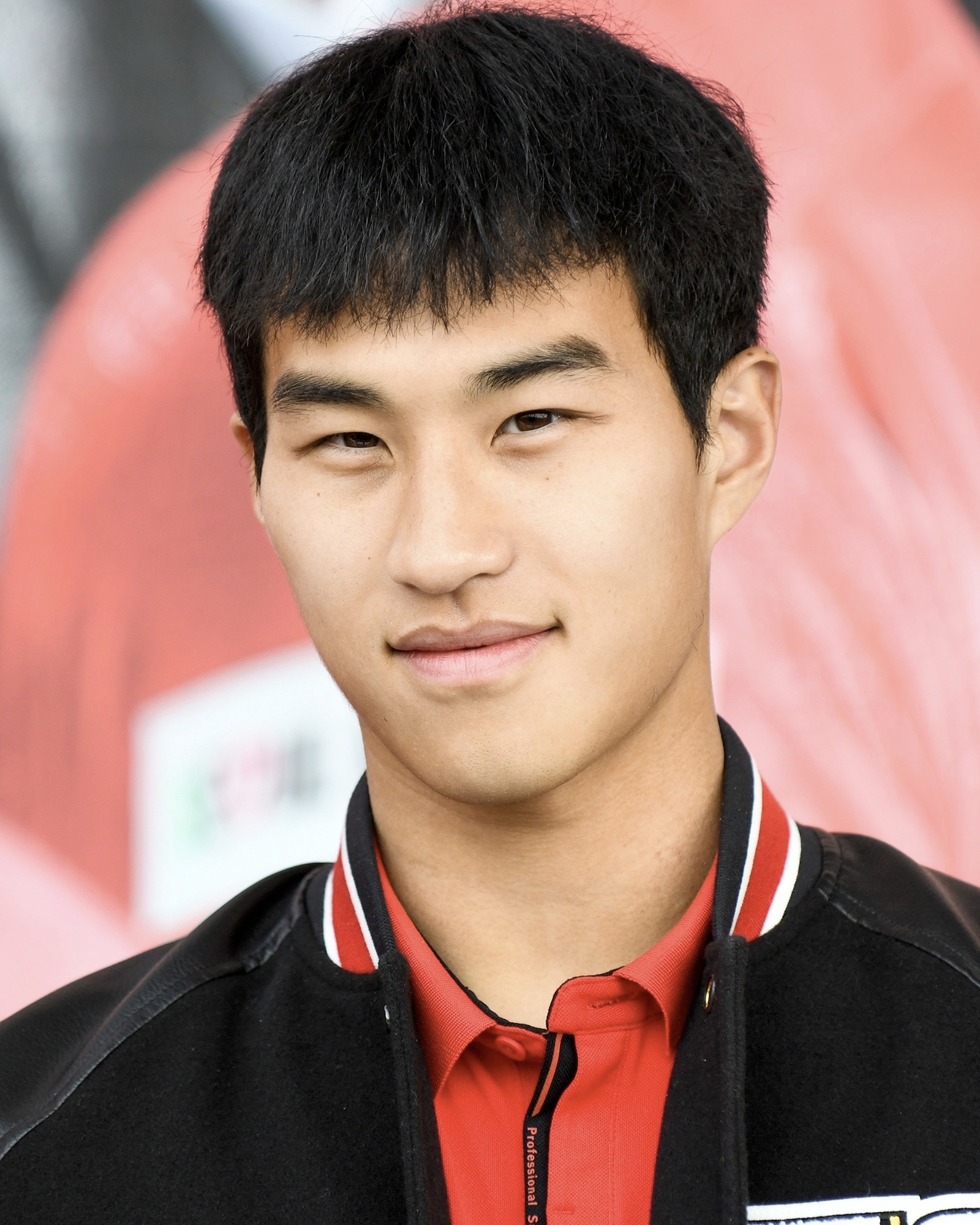
- Paik in 2024

Personal information
- Date of birth: 7 January 2002 (age 24)
- Place of birth: Gunpo, Gyeonggi Province, South Korea
- Height: 1.73 m (5 ft 8 in)
- Position: Midfielder

Team information
- Current team: Seosan Pioneer (on loan from FC Seoul)
- Number: 8

Youth career
- 2012–2014: Icheon Nam Elementary School
- 2015–2020: FC Seoul

Senior career*
Years	Team	Apps	(Gls)
2021–	FC Seoul	33	(0)
2025	→ Dangjin Citizen FC (military loan)	2	(0)
2026–	→ Seosan Pioneer (loan)	9	(0)

International career
2017–2019	South Korea U17	14	(3)
2022–2024	South Korea U23	11	(2)
- * Club domestic league appearances and goals as of 15:00, 25 October 2026 (UTC)

- Paik Sang-hoon
- Hangul: 백상훈
- RR: Baek Sanghun
- MR: Paek Sanghun

Paik Sang-hoon (Korean: 백상훈; born 7 January 2002) is a South Korean professional footballer who plays as a midfielder for K League 4 club Dangjin Citizen FC on loan from FC Seoul.

== Club career ==
He joined FC Seoul in 2021. He made his league debut on 21 April 2021, against Jeju United.

== International career ==
He was part of the South Korea squad at the 2019 FIFA U-17 World Cup.

== Career statistics ==
As of match played 1 September 2024

Appearances and goals by club, season and competition
Club	Season	League			Korea Cup		Continental		Other		Total	
Club	Season	Division	Apps	Goals	Apps	Goals	Apps	Goals	Apps	Goals	Apps	Goals
FC Seoul	2021	K League 1	18	0	0	0	—		0	0	18	0
FC Seoul	2022	K League 1	10	0	1	0	—		0	0	11	0
FC Seoul	2023	K League 1	2	0	0	0	—		0	0	2	0
FC Seoul	2024	K League 1	3	0	0	0	—		0	0	3	0
Career total			33	0	1	0	0	0	0	0	34	0
