= Park Soo-il =

South Korean footballer (born 1996)

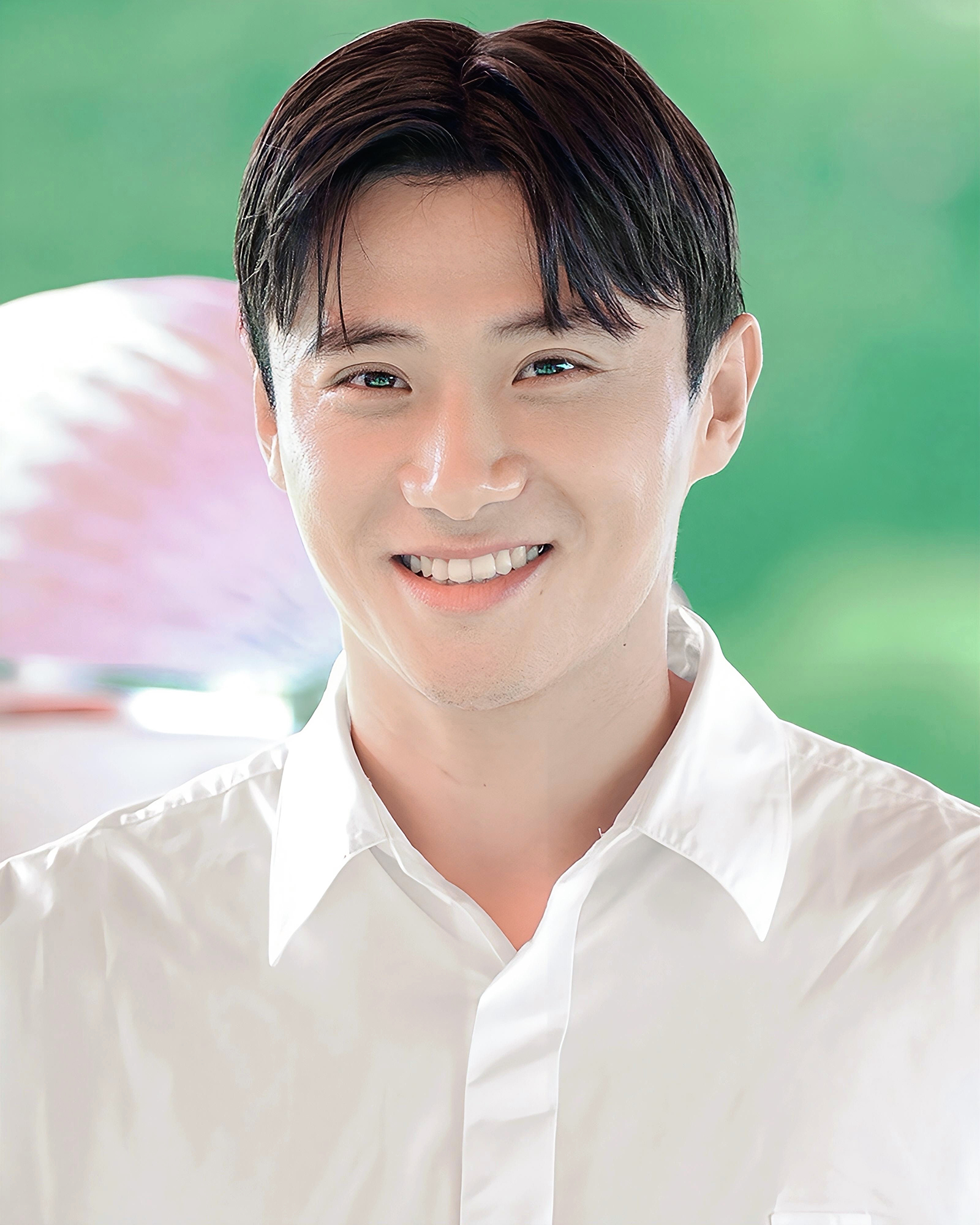
- Park in 2025

Personal information
- Date of birth: 22 February 1996 (age 30)
- Place of birth: South Korea
- Height: 1.74 m (5 ft 9 in)
- Positions: Defender; midfielder

Team information
- Current team: FC Seoul
- Number: 66

Senior career*
Years	Team	Apps	(Gls)
2017	Gimhae	22	(1)
2018–2019	Daejeon Hana Citizen	64	(1)
2020–2022	Seongnam FC	69	(8)
2023–	FC Seoul	64	(2)
2024–2025	→ Gimcheon Sangmu (draft)	41	(1)
- * Club domestic league appearances and goals as of 3 August 2026

Park Soo-il (Korean: 박수일; born 22 February 1996) is a South Korean professional footballer who plays as a defender or midfielder for K League 1 club FC Seoul.

== Club career ==
Park signed with Gimhae of the South Korean third division for the 2017 season. In 2018, he signed with Daejeon Hana Citizen in the South Korean second division. In 2020, he signed with top flight club Seongnam FC. In 2023, he joined FC Seoul.

== Career statistics ==
As of match played 14 October 2026

Appearances and goals by club, season and competition
Club	Season	League			Korea Cup		Continental		Total	
Club	Season	Division	Apps	Goals	Apps	Goals	Apps	Goals	Apps	Goals
Gimhae	2017	Korea National League	22	1	—		—		22	1
Daejeon Hana Citizen	2018	K League 2	32	0	0	0	—		32	0
Daejeon Hana Citizen	2019	K League 2	32	1	0	0	—		32	1
Daejeon Hana Citizen	Total		64	1	0	0	—		64	1
Seongnam FC	2020	K League 1	11	0	3	0	—		14	0
Seongnam FC	2021	K League 1	24	3	1	0	—		25	3
Seongnam FC	2022	K League 1	34	5	0	0	—		34	5
Seongnam FC	Total		69	8	4	0	—		73	8
FC Seoul	2023	K League 1	36	1	1	0	—		37	1
FC Seoul	2025	K League 1	17	1	1	0	3 (Note: Appearances in AFC Champions League Elite)	0	21	1
FC Seoul	2026	K League 1	11	0	0	0	1 (Note: Appearance in AFC Champions League Two)	0	12	0
FC Seoul	Total		64	2	2	0	4	0	70	2
Gimcheon Sangmu (loan)	2024	K League 1	26	0	0	0	—		26	0
Gimcheon Sangmu (loan)	2025	K League 1	15	1	0	0	—		15	1
Gimcheon Sangmu (loan)	Total		41	1	0	0	—		41	1
Career total			260	13	6	0	4	0	270	13

== Honours ==
FC Seoul

- K League 1: 2026
