= Park Dong-jin =

South Korean footballer (born 1994)

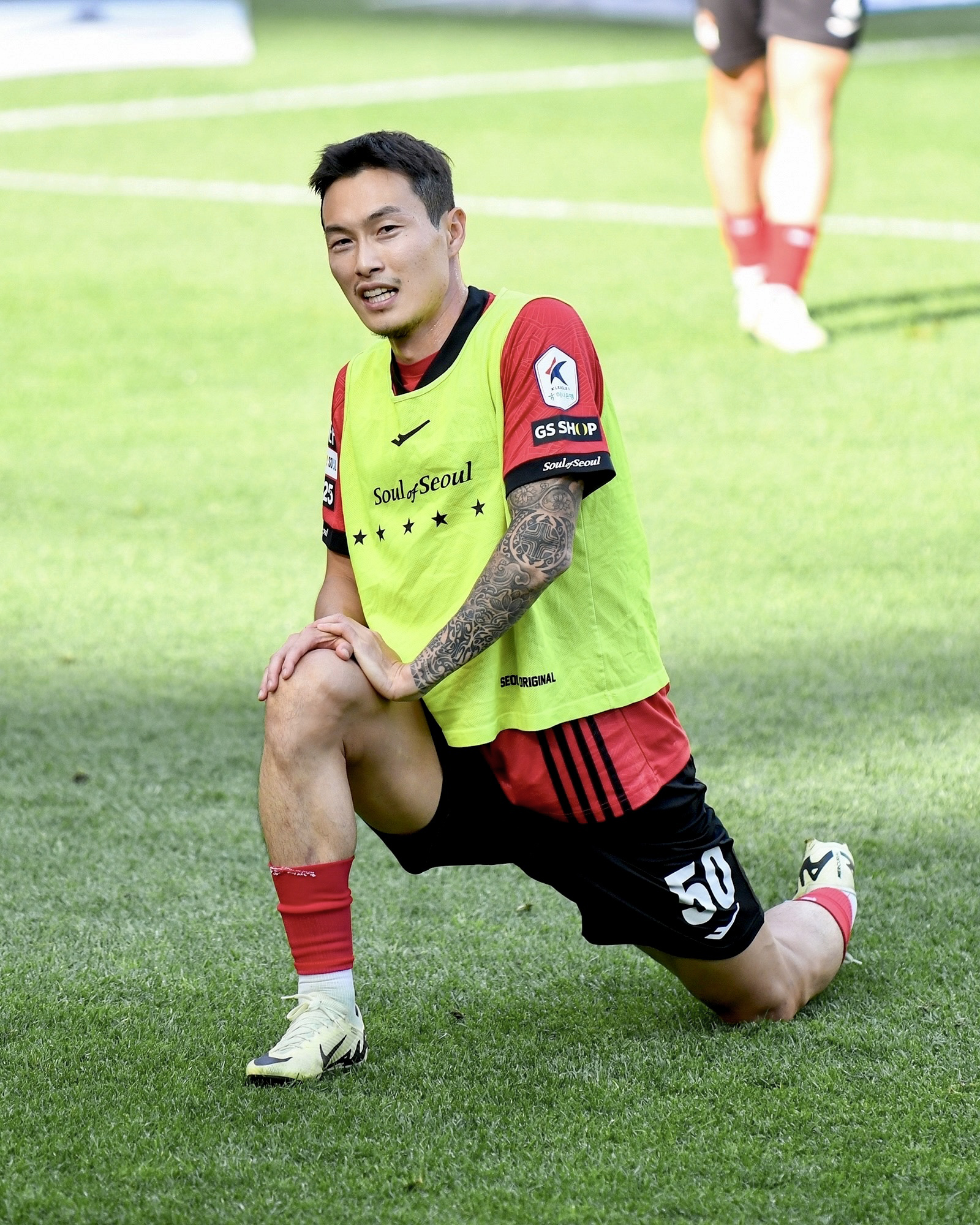
- Park in 2024

Personal information
- Date of birth: 10 December 1994 (age 31)
- Place of birth: South Korea
- Height: 1.82 m (5 ft 11 1/2 in)
- Position: Forward

Team information
- Current team: Gimpo
- Number: 50

Youth career
- 2013–2015: Hannam University

Senior career*
| Years | Team | Apps | (Gls) |
| 2016–2017 | Gwangju FC | 57 | (0) |
| 2018– | FC Seoul | 99 | (14) |
| 2020–2021 | → Sangju / Gimcheon Sangmu (army) | 28 | (10) |
| 2023 | → Busan IPark (loan) | 17 | (0) |
| 2024 | → Gyeongnam FC (loan) | 14 | (6) |
| 2025 | Jeju SK FC | 10 | (0) |
| 2025– | Gimpo | 38 | (2) |

International career^{‡}
| 2015–2016 | South Korea U23 | 16 | (0) |
- * Club domestic league appearances and goals as of 6 August 2026 ‡ National team caps and goals as of 19 January 2016

- Park Dong-jin
- Hangul: 박동진
- Hanja: 朴東鎭
- RR: Bak Dongjin
- MR: Pak Tongjin

Park Dong-jin (Korean: 박동진; born 10 December 1994) is a South Korean footballer who plays as a forward for Gimpo.

== Club career ==
=== Gwangju FC ===
After graduating Hannam University, Dong-jin joined Gwangju FC.

=== FC Seoul ===
He joined FC Seoul for the 2018 season. He changed his position to forward since 2019.

=== Jeju SK United ===
Dong-jin joined Jeju SK FC on 25 January 2025.

== International career ==
In 2014, he was selected for South Korea national under-23 football team made his debut at a match against Brazil.

In 2015, he participated in 2015 King's Cup and helped the team win the tournament. In the same year, he participated in 2015 Summer Universiade and scored two goals against Chinese Taipei, leading the team to the silver medal.

In 2016, he joined 2016 AFC U-23 Championship and led the team to 2016 Summer Olympics. He was also played for the tournament.

== Career statistics ==
=== Club ===
As of 13 March 2024

Appearances and goals by club, season and competition
| Club | Season | League | | | National cup | | Continental | | Other | | Total | |
| Club | Season | Division | Apps | Goals | Apps | Goals | Apps | Goals | Apps | Goals | Apps | Goals |
|---|---|---|---|---|---|---|---|---|---|---|---|---|
| Gwangju FC | 2016 | K League Classic | 24 | 0 | 1 | 0 | — | | — | | 25 | 0 |
| Gwangju FC | 2017 | K League Classic | 33 | 0 | 0 | 0 | — | | — | | 33 | 0 |
| Gwangju FC | Total | | 57 | 0 | 1 | 0 | — | | — | | 58 | 0 |
| FC Seoul | 2018 | K League 1 | 15 | 0 | 1 | 0 | — | | — | | 16 | 0 |
| FC Seoul | 2019 | K League 1 | 32 | 6 | — | | — | | — | | 32 | 6 |
| FC Seoul | 2020 | K League 1 | 3 | 1 | — | | 2 (Note: Appearance(s) in AFC Champions League) | 1 | — | | 5 | 2 |
| FC Seoul | 2021 | K League 1 | — | | — | | — | | — | | — | |
| FC Seoul | 2022 | K League 1 | 23 | 3 | 3 | 2 | — | | — | | 26 | 5 |
| FC Seoul | 2023 | K League 1 | 15 | 3 | — | | — | | — | | 15 | 3 |
| FC Seoul | 2024 | K League 1 | 2 | 0 | 0 | 0 | — | | — | | 2 | 0 |
| FC Seoul | Total | | 90 | 13 | 4 | 2 | 2 | 1 | — | | 95 | 16 |
| Sangju / Gimcheon Sangmu (army) | 2020 | K League 1 | 7 | 1 | 1 | 0 | — | | — | | 8 | 1 |
| Sangju / Gimcheon Sangmu (army) | 2021 | K League 2 | 21 | 9 | 1 | 1 | — | | — | | 22 | 10 |
| Sangju / Gimcheon Sangmu (army) | Total | | 28 | 10 | 2 | 1 | — | | — | | 30 | 11 |
| Busan IPark (loan) | 2023 | K League 2 | 15 | 0 | — | | — | | 2 (Note: Appearance(s) in K League 2 Playoffs) | 0 | 17 | 0 |
| Career Total | | | 190 | 25 | 7 | 1 | 2 | 1 | 2 | 0 | 201 | 27 |

== Honours ==
=== International ===
South Korea U23

- King's Cup: 2015
