= Baek Jong-bum =

South Korean footballer (born 2001)

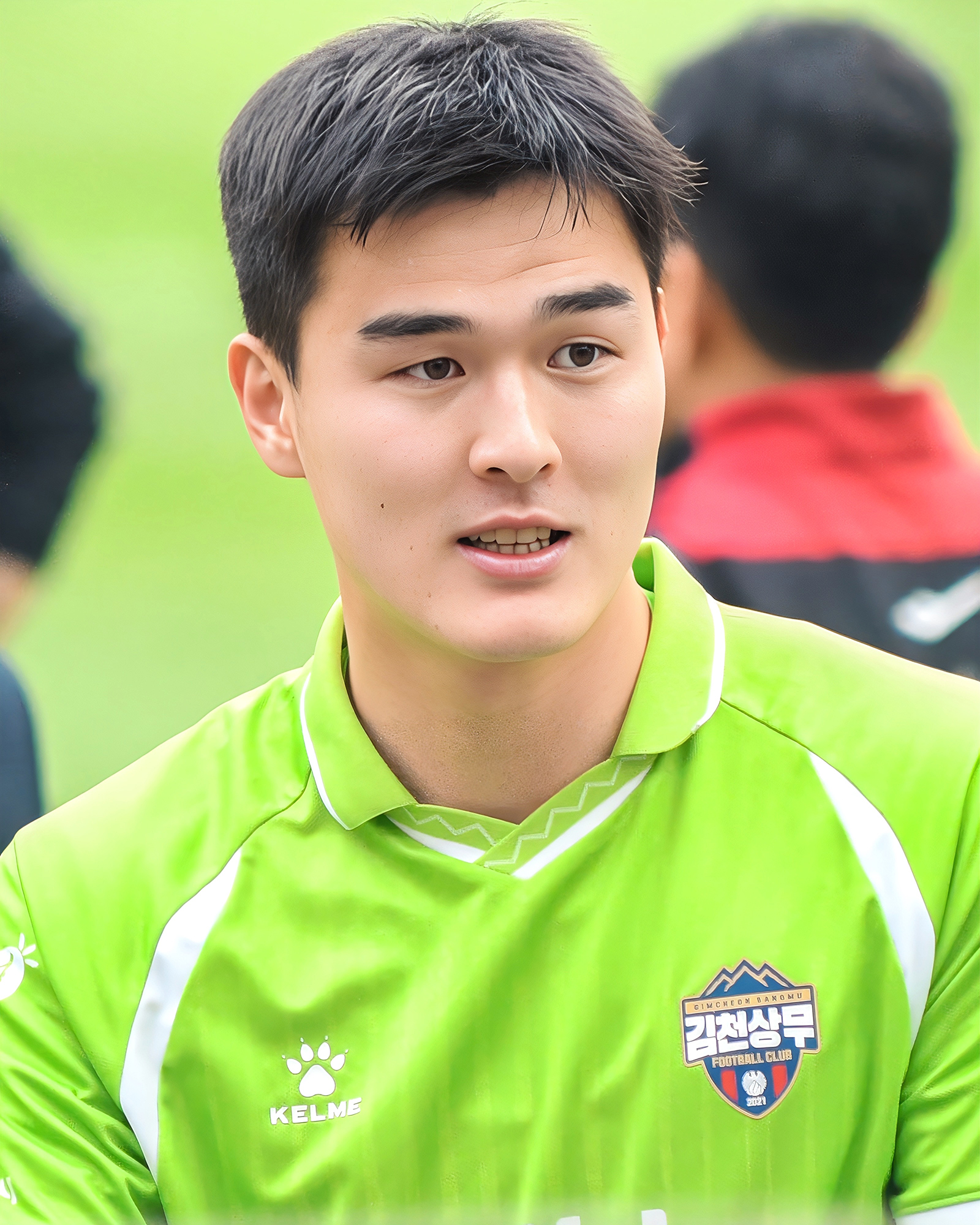
- Baek in 2026

Personal information
- Date of birth: January 21, 2001 (age 25)
- Place of birth: Daejeon, South Korea
- Height: 1.90 m (6 ft 3 in)
- Position: Goalkeeper

Team information
- Current team: FC Seoul
- Number: 26

Youth career
- 2009–2011: Kang Jung-hoon FC
- 2011–2013: Daejeon Jungang Elementary School
- 2013–2016: Osan Middle School (youth)
- 2016–2018: Osan High School (youth)

Senior career*
Years	Team	Apps	(Gls)
2019–	FC Seoul	46	(0)
2025–2026	→ Gimcheon Sangmu (draft)	27	(0)

International career
2014	South Korea U14	2	(0)
2015–2016	South Korea U17	4	(0)
2019–2021	South Korea U20	2	(0)
2021–2024	South Korea U23	5	(0)
Korean name
Hangul	백종범
Hanja	白種範
RR	Baek Jongbeom
MR	Paek Chongbŏm
- * Club domestic league appearances and goals as of October 8, 2026

Baek Jong-bum (Korean: 백종범; born January 21, 2001) is a South Korean professional footballer who plays as a goalkeeper for K League 1 club FC Seoul. Born in Daejeon, he attended Osan Middle and High School, where he underwent training through FC Seoul's development system. Baek signed with the club in 2018 and made his debut professional appearance in the 2022 K League 1 season.

== Life and career ==
=== Early life and youth career ===
Baek Jong-bum was born on January 21, 2001, in Daejeon, South Korea. He attended Daejeon Jungang Elementary School and played in its football team. It competed in the 2012 Hwarang Daegi National Youth Soccer Tournament and advanced into the finals; Baek received the GK (Goalkeeper) Award for his performance in the competition.

Baek was admitted to Osan Middle School and played for the FC Seoul U-15 Team at the 33rd Seoul Football Association President's Cup in 2014. During the penalty shoot-out at the finals, he blocked Seil Middle School's final goal attempt, leading his team to a 5–4 victory. The team won its first championship in its second year participating in the competition. The team also won all 16 of its matches at the 2015 National Secondary Soccer League Seoul Southern Region the following year; Baek was credited for its success, allowing only two goals to be scored against his club throughout the tournament. He was given the Goalkeeper Award after his team won Industrial Bank of Korea's 51st Autumn Secondary Soccer Federation tournament.

Baek enrolled at Osan High School and was vice-captain of the FC Seoul U-18 Team. During winter training for the 2018 season, he sustained an elbow injury that forced him to take a leave of absence.

=== Senior career ===
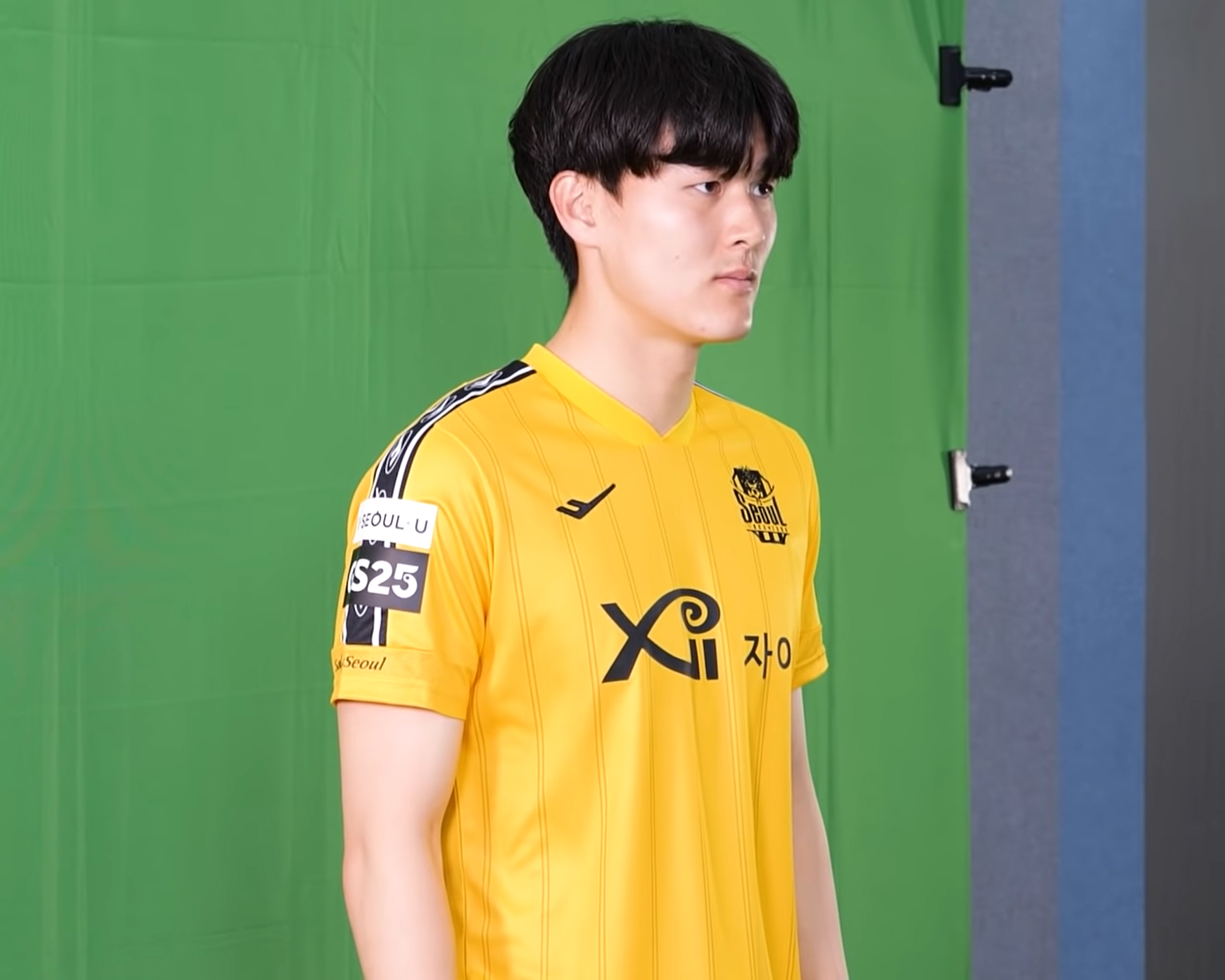
Baek in 2022

In a pool of 134 footballers, Baek was one of 15 selected to advance directly into the K League 1 in 2018. He, along with four others, signed a 5-year contract with FC Seoul, becoming the first of its players to have undergone the club's development system at both Osan Middle and High School.

Baek made his debut professional appearance in the sixth round of the 2022 K League 1 season amid an outbreak of COVID-19 among his team's squad, which faced off against Jeju United FC on March 19. In the second half of the game, as defender Jeong Woo-jae was shooting, Baek collided with the player's knee, resulting in head trauma. He was replaced by goalkeeper Hwang Sung-min and FC Seoul ultimately lost 2–1. Baek played his first full game two months later against Pohang Steelers. His strong defense led FC Seoul to a 1–0 victory. Midway through the year, he sustained an unspecified significant injury; FC Seoul recruited goalkeeper Seo Ju-hwan for the remainder of the season in Baek's absence.

Baek enlisted in the military football team Gimcheon Sangmu FC in April 2025 to fulfill his mandatory military service.

== International career ==
Baek represented South Korea at the 2014 AFC U-14 Championship, 2015 AFC U-16 Championship, and 2020 AFC U-19 Championship.

== Style of play ==
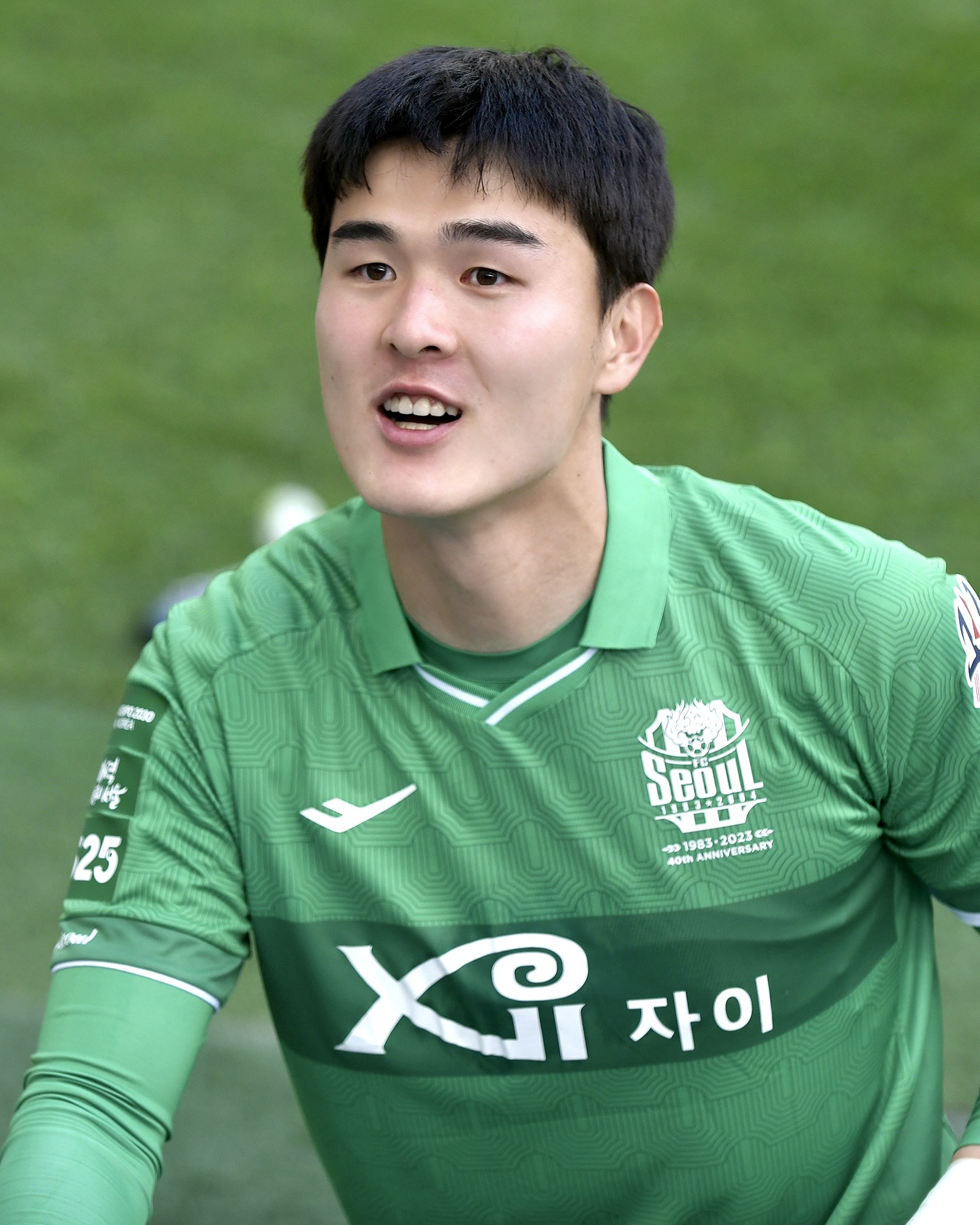
Baek in 2023

Standing at 1.90 m (6 ft 3 in), Baek takes advantage of his height to catch balls in midair. His game management skills and coordinated defense, particularly against penalty kicks, are noted as his strengths.

== Career statistics ==
As of June 7, 2026

Appearances and goals by club, season and competition
Club	Season	League			Korea Cup		Continental		Other		Total	
Club	Season	Division	Apps	Goals	Apps	Goals	Apps	Goals	Apps	Goals	Apps	Goals
FC Seoul	2020	K League 1	0	0	0	0	0	0	—		0	0
FC Seoul	2021	K League 1	0	0	0	0	—		—		0	0
FC Seoul	2022	K League 1	4	0	0	0	—		—		4	0
FC Seoul	2023	K League 1	26	0	0	0	—		—		26	0
FC Seoul	2024	K League 1	16	0	2	0	—		—		28	0
FC Seoul	2025	K League 1	0	0	0	0	—		—		0	0
FC Seoul	Total		46	0	2	0	—		—		48	0
Gimcheon Sangmu (draft)	2025	K League 1	2	0	0	0	—		—		2	0
Gimcheon Sangmu (draft)	2026	K League 1	14	0	0	0	—		—		14	0
Gimcheon Sangmu (draft)	Total		16	0	0	0	—		—		16	0
Career total			62	0	2	0	0	0	0	0	64	0

== Honours ==
FC Seoul

- K League 1: 2026
