= Han Chan-hee =

South Korean footballer (born 1997)

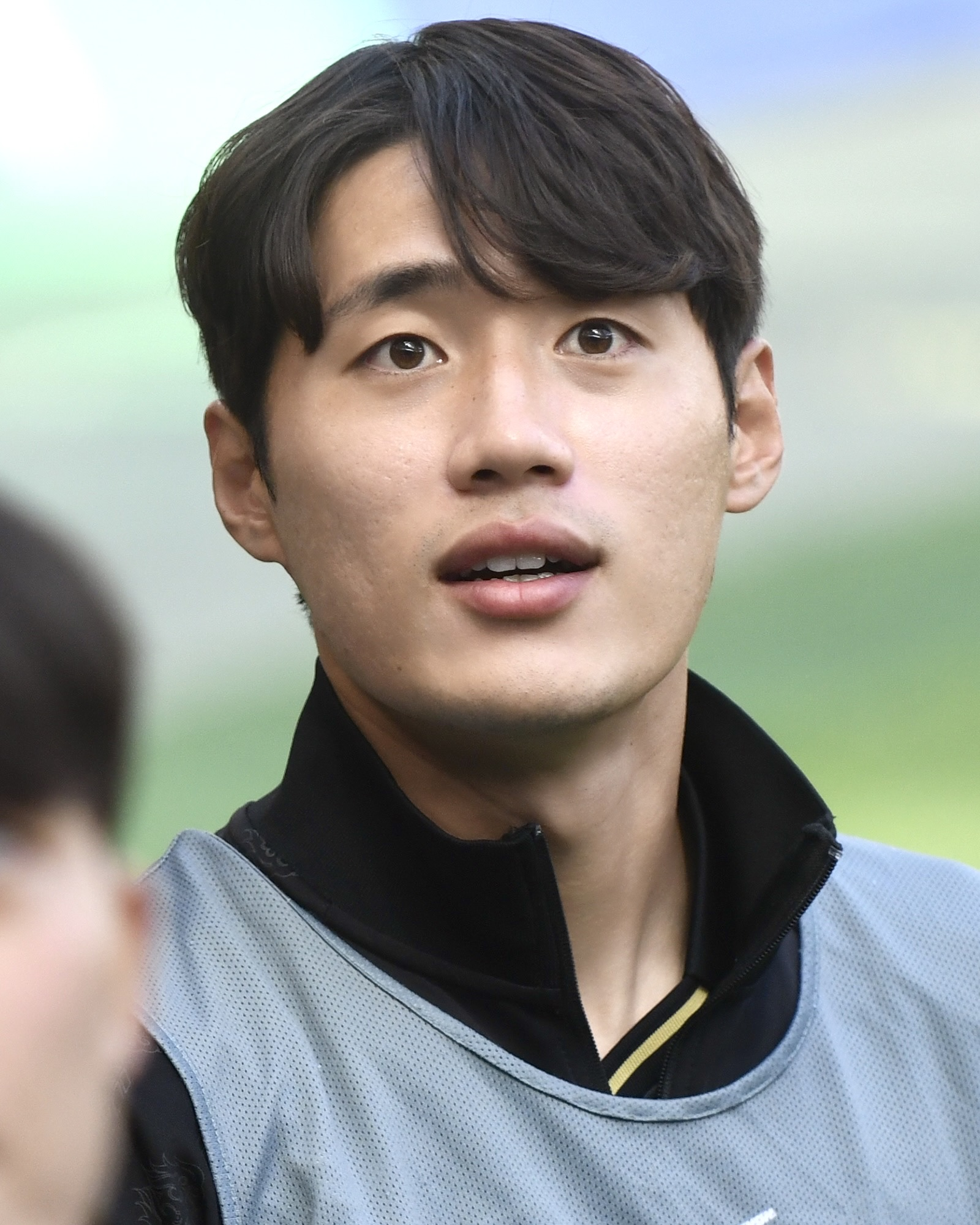
- Han in 2023

Personal information
- Full name: Han Chan-hee
- Date of birth: 17 March 1997 (age 29)
- Place of birth: Suncheon, Jeollanam-do, South Korea
- Height: 1.85 m (6 ft 1 in)
- Position: Midfielder

Team information
- Current team: Suwon FC
- Number: 18

Youth career
- 2010–2015: Jeonnam Dragons

Senior career*
Years	Team	Apps	(Gls)
2016–2019	Jeonnam Dragons	113	(9)
2020–2022	FC Seoul	26	(2)
2021–2022	→ Gimcheon Sangmu (army)	12	(1)
2023–2025	Pohang Steelers	58	(2)
2025–	Suwon FC	32	(1)

International career^{‡}
2014–2017	South Korea U-20	20 (Note: Includes twe appearances against non-national team.)	(2)
2019–2021	South Korea U-23	7 (Note: Includes one appearance against another KFA team.)	(1)
- * Club domestic league appearances and goals as of 5 August 2026 ‡ National team caps and goals as of 12 October 2020

- Han Chan-hee
- Hangul: 한찬희
- Hanja: 韓贊熙
- RR: Han Chanhui
- MR: Han Ch'anhŭi

Han Chan-hee (Korean: 한찬희; born 17 March 1997) is a South Korean football midfielder who plays for Suwon FC.

== Club career ==
Han joined Jeonnam Dragons in 2016 and made his league debut against Seongnam FC on 13 April 2016.

Han joined FC Seoul in January 2020.

== International career ==
He has been a member of the South Korea national U-20 team since 2014.

== Career statistics ==
=== Club ===
Club performance			League		Cup		Continental		Other		Total	
Season	Club	League	Apps	Goals	Apps	Goals	Apps	Goals	Apps	Goals	Apps	Goals
South Korea			League		KFA Cup		Asia		Play-off		Total	
2016	Jeonnam Dragons	K League 1	23	1	1	0	—		—		24	1
2017	Jeonnam Dragons	K League 1	29	3	1	0	—		—		30	3
2018	Jeonnam Dragons	K League 1	31	2	2	0	—		—		33	2
2019	Jeonnam Dragons	K League 2	30	3	0	0	—		—		30	3
2020	FC Seoul	K League 1	12	1	2	0	6	0	—		20	1
2021	FC Seoul	K League 1	6	0	0	0	—		—		6	0
2021	Gimcheon Sangmu	K League 2	2	1	1	0	—		—		3	1
2022	Gimcheon Sangmu	K League 1	10	0	2	0	—		0	0	12	0
2023	FC Seoul	K League 1	8	1	0	0	—		—		8	1
Total	South Korea		151	12	9	0	6	0	0	0	166	12
Career total			151	12	9	0	6	0	0	0	166	12
