= Kim Jin-ya =

South Korean footballer (born 1998)

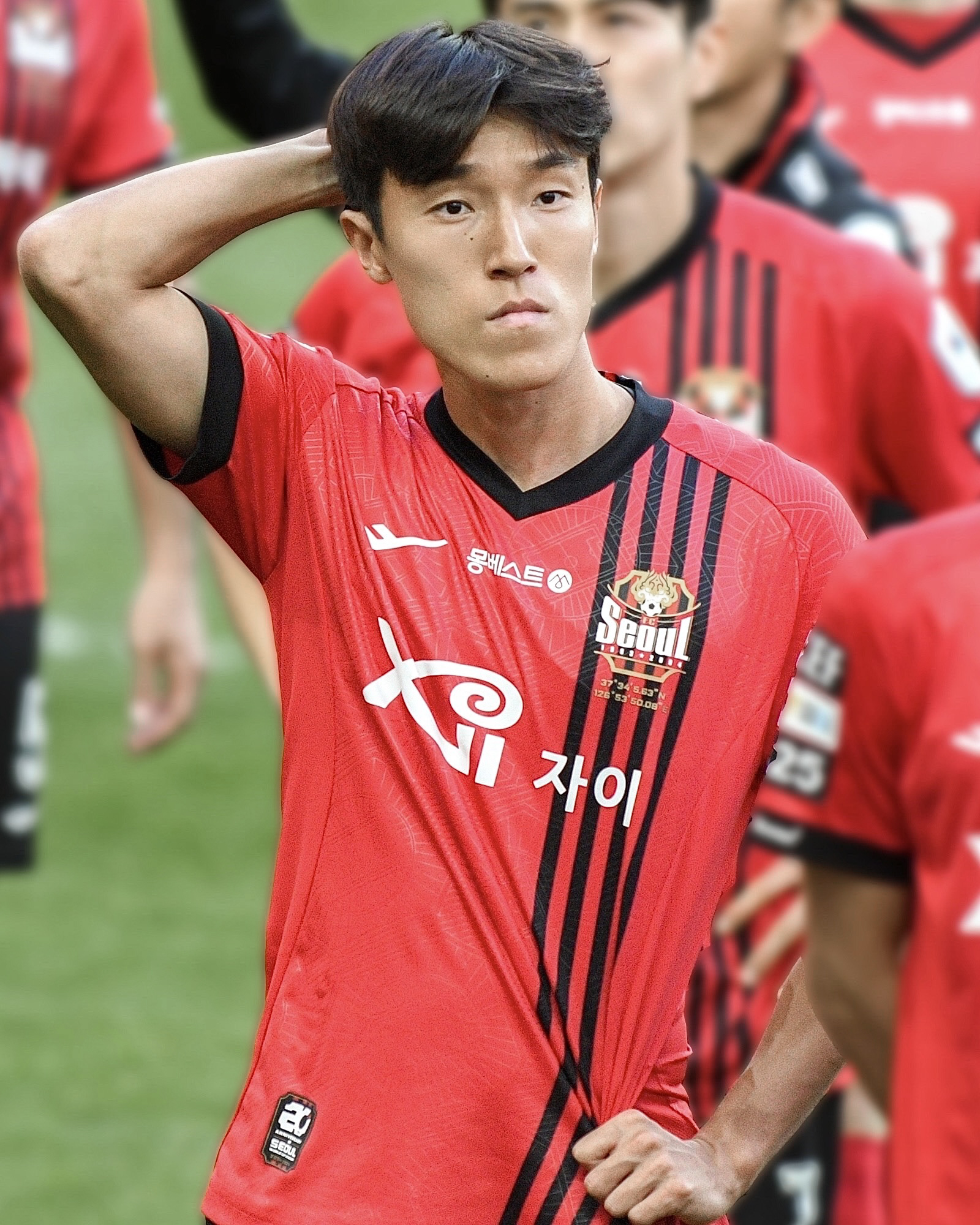
- Kim in November 2024

Personal information
- Date of birth: 30 June 1998 (age 28)
- Place of birth: Incheon, South Korea
- Height: 1.77 m (5 ft 10 in)
- Positions: Midfielder; full-back

Team information
- Current team: Daejeon Hana Citizen
- Number: 13

Youth career
- 2011–2013: Gwangseong Middle School (Youth)
- 2014–2016: Incheon Daegeon High School (Youth)

Senior career*
Years	Team	Apps	(Gls)
2017–2019	Incheon United	73	(1)
2020–2025	FC Seoul	137	(1)
2025–	Daejeon Hana Citizen	7	(0)

International career^{‡}
2015	South Korea U-17	12 (Note: Includes four appearances one goal against non-national team.)	(1)
2016–2017	South Korea U-20	8	(1)
2018–2021	South Korea U-23	28 (Note: Includes two appearances against another KFA team.)	(2)
Medal record
Men's football
Representing South Korea
Asian Games
Gold medal – first place	Jakarta-Palembang 2018	Team
AFC U-23 Championship
Gold medal – first place	Thailand 2020	Team
- * Club domestic league appearances and goals as of 3 August 2026 ‡ National team caps and goals as of 31 July 2021

- Kim Jin-ya
- Hangul: 김진야
- Hanja: 金眞冶
- RR: Gim Jinya
- MR: Kim Chinya

Kim Jin-ya (Korean: 김진야; born 30 June 1998) is a South Korean footballer who plays for K League 1 club Daejeon Hana Citizen. Mainly a full-back, he can also play as a midfielder.

== Club career ==
=== Incheon United ===
After graduating from Daegun High School, Kim began his professional career with Incheon United FC.

=== FC Seoul ===
On 13 December 2019, he officially moved to FC Seoul in K League 1.

During his time in Seoul, Kim was selected for one of the club's vice-captains for the 2022 and 2023 K League 1 seasons.

=== Daejeon Hana Citizen ===
On 20 June 2025, Kim transferred to K League 1 club Daejeon Hana Citizen on a permanent basis.

== International career ==
He was part of the South Korea U-23 squad that won gold at the 2018 Asian Games.

== Career statistics ==
As of match played 2 November 2024

Appearances and goals by club, season and competition
Club	Season	League			Cup		Continental		Total	
Club	Season	Division	Apps	Goals	Apps	Goals	Apps	Goals	Apps	Goals
Incheon United	2017	K League 1	16	0	0	0	—		16	0
Incheon United	2018	K League 1	25	1	0	0	—		25	1
Incheon United	2019	K League 1	32	0	1	0	—		33	0
Incheon United	Total		73	1	1	0	—		74	1
FC Seoul	2020	K League 1	24	0	2	0	2	0	28	0
FC Seoul	2021	K League 1	18	0	1	0	—		19	0
FC Seoul	2022	K League 1	34	1	6	0	—		40	1
FC Seoul	2023	K League 1	29	0	0	0	—		29	0
FC Seoul	2024	K League 1	15	0	3	0	—		18	0
FC Seoul	Total		120	1	12	0	2	0	134	1
Career total			193	2	13	0	2	0	208	2

== Honours ==
=== International ===
South Korea U-23

- Asian Games: 2018
- AFC U-23 Championship: 2020
