= Kim Sin-jin =

South Korean footballer (born 2001)

- Kim in 2026

Personal information
- Date of birth: July 13, 2001 (age 25)
- Place of birth: Daejeon, South Korea
- Height: 1.86 m (6 ft 1 in)
- Position: Striker

Team information
- Current team: Jeju SK
- Number: 18

Youth career
- 2010–2014: Daejeon Jeonglim Elementary School
- 2014–2016: Gunsan Jeil Middle School
- 2017–2019: Gunsan Jeil High School
- 2019–2020: Gangneung Jeil High School (youth)

College career
Years	Team	Apps	(Gls)
2020–2021	Sun Moon University	20	(18)

Senior career*
Years	Team	Apps	(Gls)
2022–2025	FC Seoul	58	(9)
2024–	→ Seoul E-Land FC (loan)	12	(2)
2025	Gangwon FC	3	(0)
2026–	Jeju SK	13	(3)

International career^{‡}
2023	South Korea U23	5	(1)
Korean name
Hangul	김신진
Hanja	金信珍
RR	Gim Sinjin
MR	Kim Sinjin
- * Club domestic league appearances and goals as of August 3, 2026 ‡ National team caps and goals as of September 12, 2023

Kim Sin-jin (Korean: 김신진; born July 13, 2001) is a South Korean professional footballer who plays as a striker for K League 1 club Jeju SK. He made his debut professional appearance in the 2022 K League 1 season.

== Life and career ==
=== Early life and youth career ===
Kim Sin-jin was born on July 13, 2001, in Daejeon, South Korea. He has an older brother named Jeong-jin, who influenced him to play soccer in second grade. He attended Daejeon Jeonglim Elementary School, Gunsan Jeil Middle School, and Gunsan Jeil High School. In 2018, Kim enrolled in Gangneung Jeil High School and played for the Gangwon FC U-18 squad at the 2nd Asia International Youth in Tottori tournament. He scored a hat trick against the Hong Kong national under-18 football team, leading his team to a 5–0 victory.

At the start of the 2020 U-League college football season, Kim was unable to participate in three matches due to a calf injury. Playing for Sun Moon University, Kim scored two goals at the U-League King of Kings finals against Dongguk University. His team won 2–1, giving the institution its first championship in the tournament. He became the top-scoring player in the regional league with seven goals in six games. Kim's performance earned him U-League's Best Young Player Award. The following year, he played at the 57th Spring University Football Federation Tournament in Tongyeong, where he scored two goals in the finals against Jeonju University and allowed his team to win 3–1. He also scored two goals at the 57th Autumn University Football Federation – Taebaeksangi competition, with his team winning 2–1 against Soongsil University.

=== Senior career ===
In 2021, Kim signed a free contract with FC Seoul. He made his debut professional appearance as a substitute in the second round of the 2022 K League 1 season as the team faced off against Incheon United FC. Amid an outbreak of COVID-19 among his team's squad, Kim played as a center back in the sixth round of the season against Jeju United FC. Writing for the website InterFootball, Shin Dong-hun wrote that Kim appeared anxious in the position, which negatively impacted his gameplay.

On July 30, 2024, he was loaned to Seoul E-Land FC.

== Style of play ==
Kim plays as a striker identified as "key player" due to his strength, game sense, and flexibility. He has occasionally been utilized as a center back. Kim has cited Robert Lewandowski, Kim Ji-hyeon, and Harry Kane as role models.

== Career statistics ==
As of July 30, 2024.

Club	Season	League			Cup		Continental		Other		Total	
Club	Season	Division	Apps	Goals	Apps	Goals	Apps	Goals	Apps	Goals	Apps	Goals
FC Seoul	2022	K League 1	20	3	2	1	0	0	0	0	22	4
FC Seoul	2023	K League 1	27	5	0	0	0	0	0	0	27	5
FC Seoul	2024	K League 1	9	1	0	0	0	0	0	0	9	1
Career total			56	9	2	1	0	0	0	0	58	10
