= Lim Min-hyeok =

South Korean footballer (born 1997)

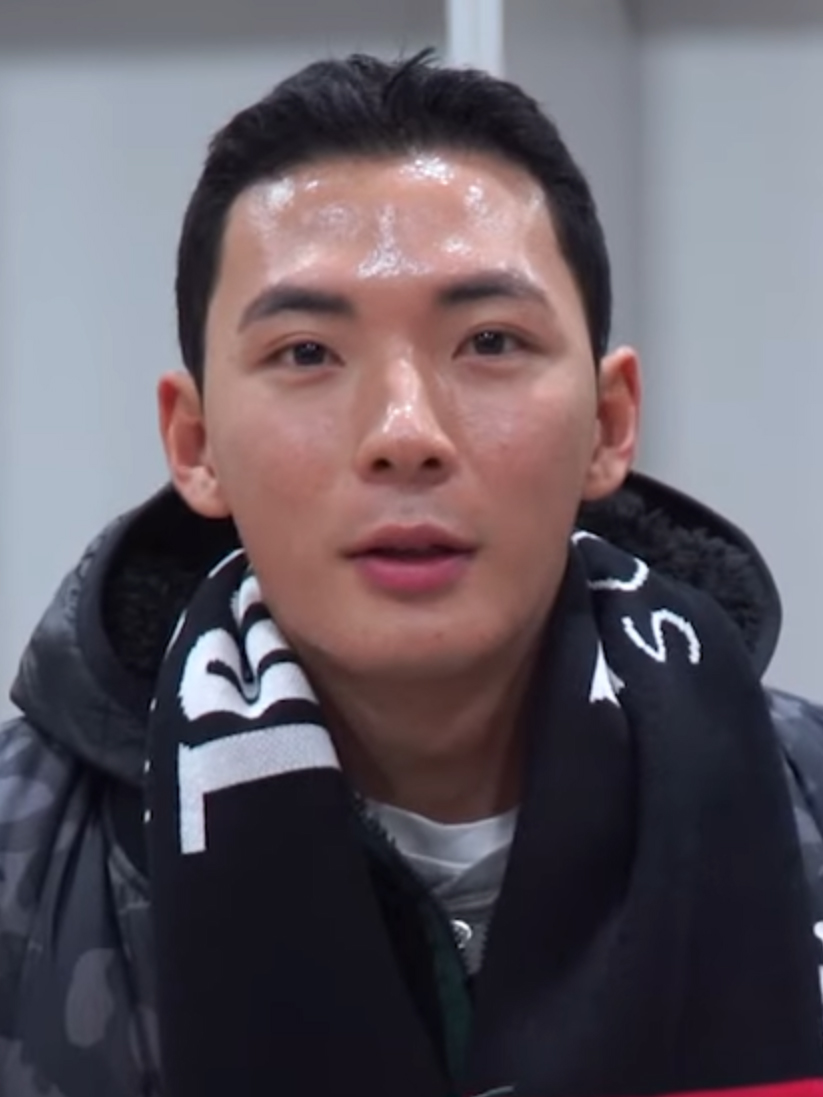
- Lim in December 2021

Personal information
- Full name: Lim Min-hyeok
- Date of birth: 5 March 1997 (age 29)
- Place of birth: South Korea
- Height: 1.68 m (5 ft 6 in)
- Position: Midfielder

Team information
- Current team: Busan IPark

Youth career
- 2013–2015: Suwon Technical High School

Senior career*
Years	Team	Apps	(Gls)
2016–2017	FC Seoul	7	(0)
2018–2020	Gwangju FC	62	(5)
2021	Gyeongnam FC	19	(0)
2022	FC Seoul	10	(0)
2023	→ Busan IPark (loan)	26	(2)
2024–	Busan IPark	53	(5)
2025–	→ FC Anyang (loan)	6	(0)

International career^{‡}
2015–2017	South Korea U20	27	(3)
- * Club domestic league appearances and goals as of 5 January 2026 ‡ National team caps and goals as of 1 July 2017

- Lim Min-hyeok
- Hangul: 임민혁
- Hanja: 任旼赫
- RR: Im Minhyeok
- MR: Im Minhyŏk

Lim Min-hyeok (Korean: 임민혁; born 5 March 1997) is a South Korean football midfielder who plays for Busan IPark in K League 2.

== Club career ==
Lim played college football for Suwon Technical High School.

Lim joined FC Seoul in 2016 and made his league debut against Jeju United on 24 July 2016. In the game, he was sent off after getting two yellow cards.

Lim joined Gwangju FC in 2018.

Lim joined Gyeongnam FC in 2021.

On 31 December 2021, FC Seoul announced that Lim had a signed contract, a 3-year deal until 2024.

On 28 February 2023, he was loaned to Busan IPark.

On 27 January 2024, he got permanently transferred to Busan IPark.

== International career ==
He has been a member of the South Korea national U-20 team since 2015.

== Club career statistics ==
Club performance			League		Cup		continental		Total	
Season	Club	League	Apps	Goals	Apps	Goals	Apps	Goals	Apps	Goals
South Korea			League		KFA Cup		Asia		Total	
2016	FC Seoul	K League Classic	3	0	0	0	0	0	3	0
Total	South Korea		3	0	0	0	0	0	3	0
Career total			3	0	0	0	0	0	3	0
