= Lee Sang-min (footballer, born 1998) =

South Korean footballer

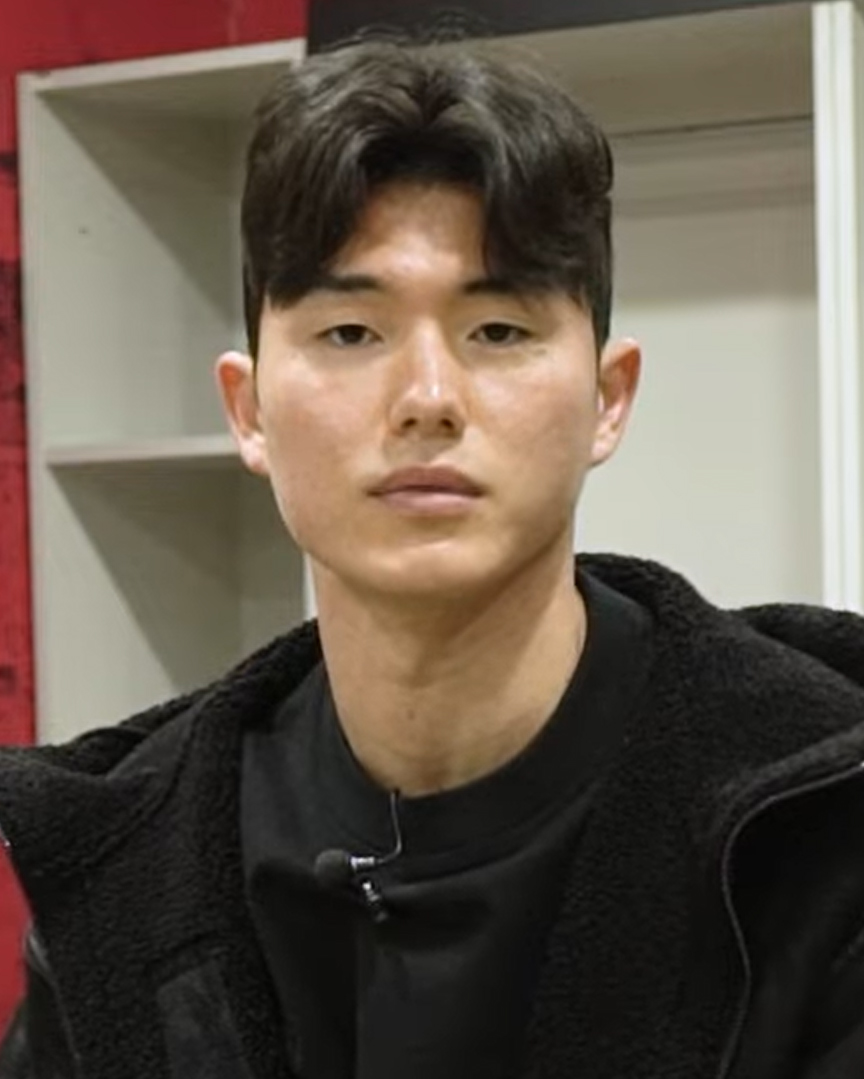
- Lee in 2022

Personal information
- Date of birth: 1 January 1998 (age 28)
- Place of birth: Busan, South Korea
- Height: 1.88 m (6 ft 2 in)
- Position: Defender

Team information
- Current team: FC Seoul
- Number: 4

Youth career
- 2013–2015: Ulsan Hyundai High School
- 2016–2017: Soongsil University

Senior career*
Years	Team	Apps	(Gls)
2018–2019	Ulsan Hyundai	0	(0)
2019	→ V-Varen Nagasaki (loan)	16	(0)
2020	→ Seoul E-Land (loan)	26	(0)
2021	Seoul E-Land	28	(1)
2022–	FC Seoul	26	(1)
2023–2024	→ Gimcheon Sangmu (draft)	30	(2)

International career
2012	South Korea U-14	2	(0)
2013–2015	South Korea U17	24 (Note: Includes two appearances against non-national team.)	(1)
2016–2017	South Korea U20	15	(0)
2017–2021	South Korea U23	22 (Note: Includes one appearance against another KFA team.)	(1)
2017	South Korea Universiade	5	(0)
Medal record
Men's football
Representing South Korea
AFC U-23 Championship
Gold medal – first place	Thailand 2020
- * Club domestic league appearances and goals as of 14:33, 25 October 2026 (UTC)

- Korean name
- Hangul: 이상민
- Hanja: 李尚珉
- RR: I Sangmin
- MR: I Sangmin

Lee Sang-min (Korean: 이상민; born 1 January 1998) is a South Korean professional footballer who plays as a defender for K League 1 club FC Seoul.

== Club career ==
=== Seoul E-Land FC ===
In 2020, he joined Seoul E-Land FC of K League 2 on loan from Ulsan Hyundai.

In 2021, he was fully transferred to the club.

=== FC Seoul ===
In 2022, Lee joined FC Seoul.

== International career ==
In a friendly match against Zambia on 27 March 2017, Lee successfully resuscitated the unconscious Jeong Tae-wook, saving his life.

He captained the South Korean under-23 team at the 2020 AFC U-23 Championship and the 2020 Summer Olympics.

== Career statistics ==
As of match played 24 October 2026

Appearances and goals by club, season and competition
Club	Season	League			National cup (Note: Includes Emperor's Cup, Korea Cup)		League cup (Note: Includes J.League Cup)		Continental		Total	
Club	Season	Division	Apps	Goals	Apps	Goals	Apps	Goals	Apps	Goals	Apps	Goals
Ulsan Hyundai	2018	K League 1	0	0	0	0	—		0	0	0	0
V-Varen Nagasaki (loan)	2019	J2 League	16	0	4	0	5	0	—		25	0
Seoul E-Land (loan)	2020	K League 2	26	0	1	0	—		—		27	0
Seoul E-Land	2021	K League 2	28	1	1	0	—		—		29	1
Seoul E-Land	Seoul E-Land total		54	1	2	0	—		—		56	1
FC Seoul	2022	K League 1	25	1	5	0	—		—		30	1
FC Seoul	2025	K League 1	0	0	0	0	—		0	0	0	0
FC Seoul	2026	K League 1	1	0	0	0	—		2 (Note: Appearances in AFC Champions League Two)	0	3	0
FC Seoul	Total		26	1	5	0	—		2	0	33	1
Gimcheon Sangmu (draft)	2023	K League 2	27	2	0	0	—		—		27	2
Gimcheon Sangmu (draft)	2024	K League 1	1	0	0	0	—		—		1	0
Gimcheon Sangmu (draft)	Total		28	2	0	0	—		—		28	2
Career total			124	4	11	0	5	0	2	0	142	4

== Honours ==
FC Seoul

- K League 1: 2026

South Korea U23

- AFC U-23 Championship: 2020

Individua;

- KFA Awards Best Young Player: 2015
