= Kim Jin-sung (footballer, born 1999) =

Korean footballer

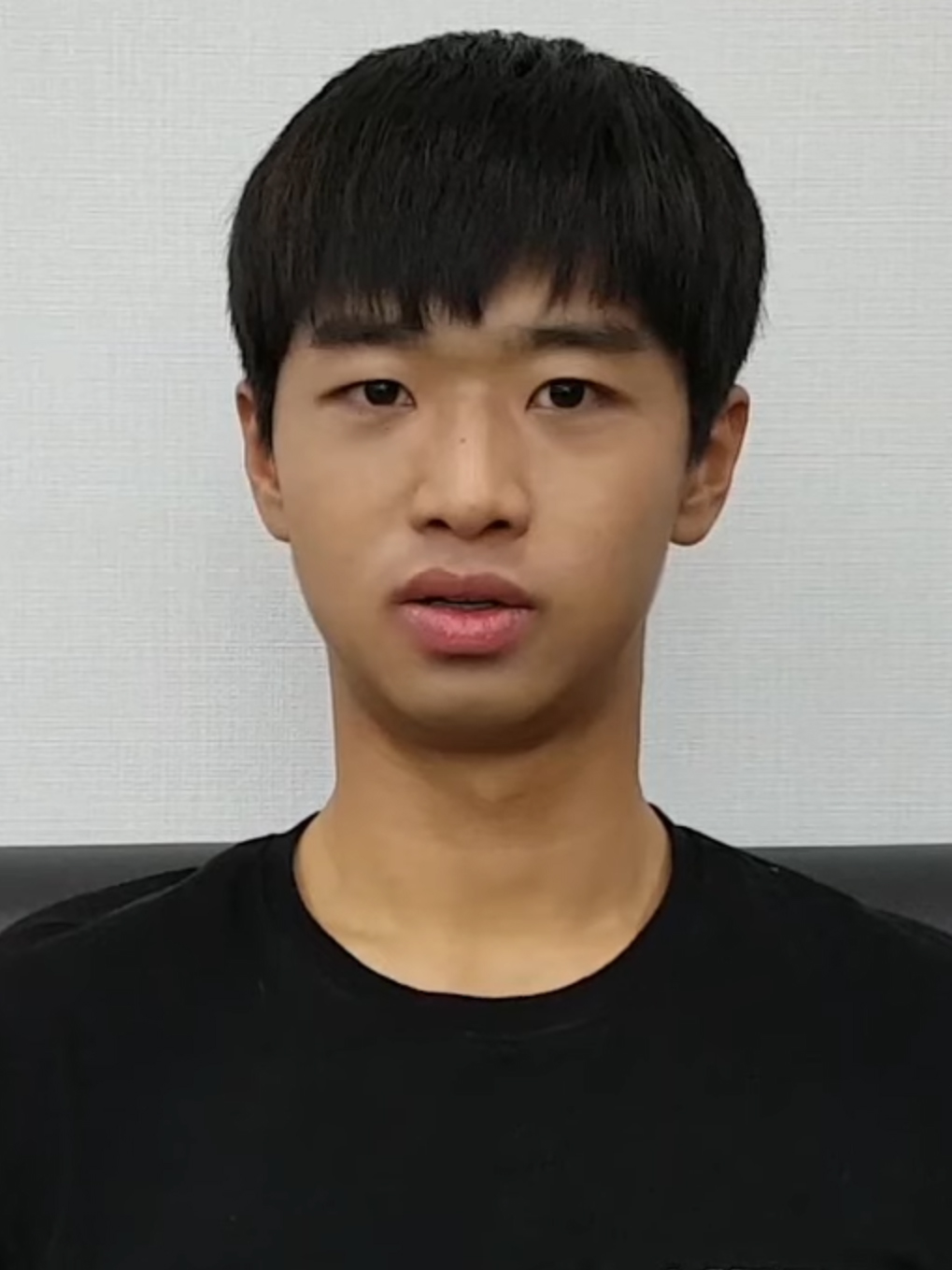
- Kim in February 2020

Personal information
- Date of birth: 9 December 1999 (age 26)
- Place of birth: Gimpo, South Korea
- Height: 1.75 m (5 ft 9 in)
- Position: Attacking midfielder

Youth career
- 2018–2019: Kwangwoon University

Senior career*
Years	Team	Apps	(Gls)
2020–2023	FC Seoul	9	(1)
2022	→ Cheonan City (loan)	2	(0)
2023	→ PSMS Medan (loan)	6	(1)
- * Club domestic league appearances and goals as of 7 April 2024

- Kim Jin-sung
- Hangul: 김진성
- Hanja: 金眞成
- RR: Gim Jinseong
- MR: Kim Chinsŏng

Kim Jin-sung (Korean: 김진성; born 9 December 1999) is a South Korean footballer who plays as an attacking midfielder.

== Career ==
Kim Jin-sung joined FC Seoul in 2020. He made his K League 1 debut on 3 April 2021 against Gangwon FC.

On 13 July 2022, he was loaned to Cheonan City of K3 League.
