= Hwang Sung-min =

South Korean footballer (born 1991)

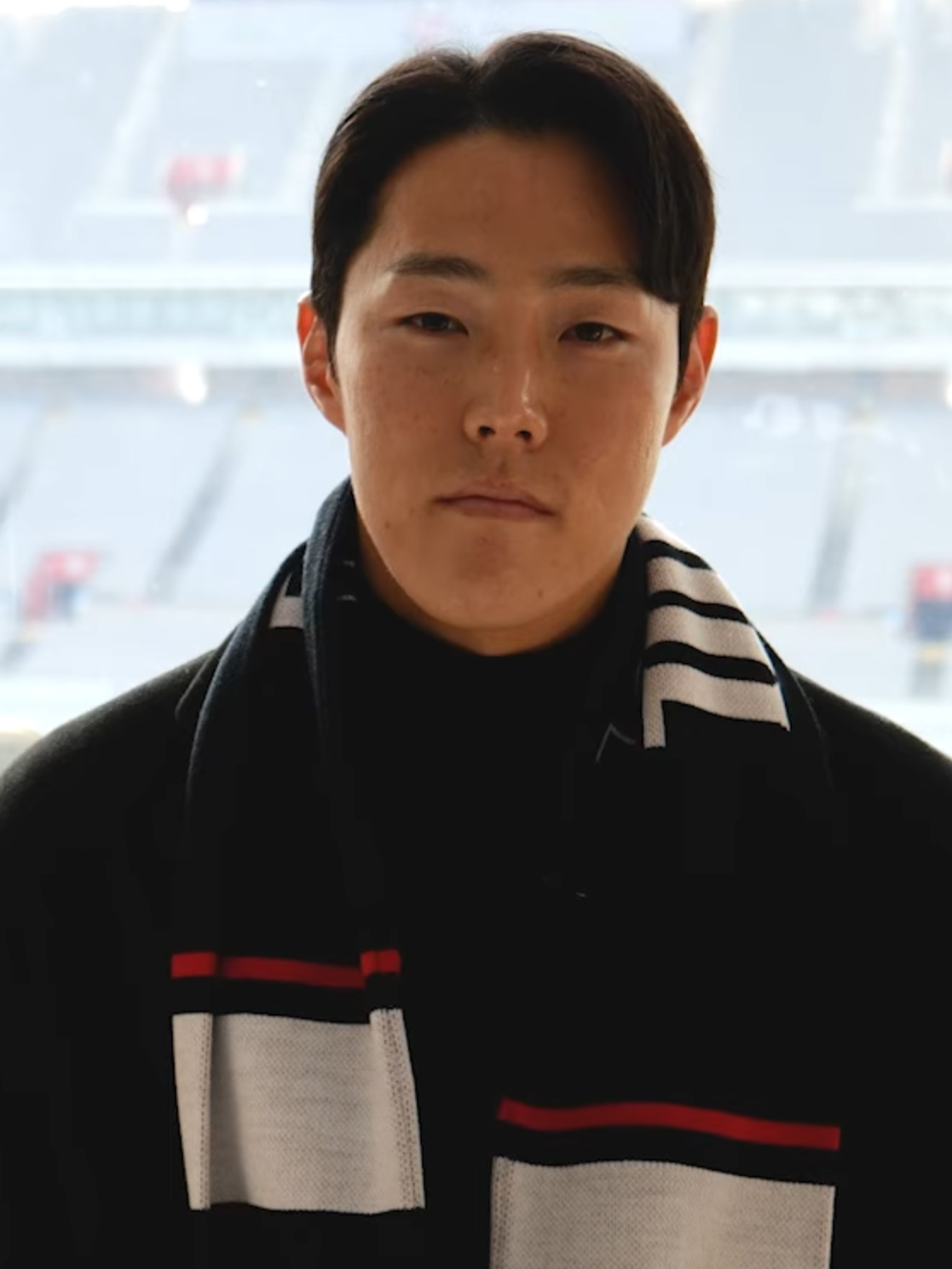
- Hwang with FC Seoul in 2022

Personal information
- Full name: Hwang Sung-min
- Date of birth: 23 June 1991 (age 35)
- Place of birth: South Korea
- Height: 1.88 m (6 ft 2 in)
- Position: Goalkeeper

Team information
- Current team: Yongin FC
- Number: 21

Youth career
- 2010–2012: Hannam University

Senior career*
Years	Team	Apps	(Gls)
2013–2015	Chungju Hummel	73	(0)
2016	Ulsan Hyundai Mipo Dolphin	18	(0)
2017–2018	Ansan Greeners	50	(0)
2019	Jeju United	4	(0)
2020–2021	Gyeongnam FC	13	(0)
2022–2024	FC Seoul	3	(0)
2025	Incheon United	0	(0)
2026–	Yongin FC	13	(0)
- * Club domestic league appearances and goals as of 6 August 2026

Hwang Sung-min (Korean: 황성민; born 23 June 1991) is a South Korean footballer who plays as a goalkeeper for K League 2 club, Yongin FC.

== Club career ==
He was selected by Chungju Hummel in 2013 K League draft. He made his debut match in the opening game of the 2013 season.

He joined FC Seoul of K League 1 for the 2022 season.

Sung-min joined Incheon United in 2025.

In 2026, Sung-min joined to K League 2 new club, Yongin FC.

== Career statistics ==
As of 6 August 2026.

Appearances and goals by club, season and competition
Club	Season	League			Korea Cup		Other		Total	
Club	Season	Division	Apps	Goals	Apps	Goals	Apps	Goals	Apps	Goals
Chungju Hummel	2013	K League 2	19	0	0	0	—		19	0
Chungju Hummel	2014	K League 2	21	0	0	0	—		21	0
Chungju Hummel	2015	K League 2	33	0	1	0	—		34	0
Chungju Hummel	Total		73	0	1	0	0	0	74	0
Ulsan Hyundai Mipo Dolphin	2016	Korea National League	18	0	0	0	3 (Note: Appearance(s) in Championship play-offs)	0	21	0
Ansan Greeners	2017	K League 2	30	0	0	0	—		30	0
Ansan Greeners	2018	K League 2	20	0	0	0	—		20	0
Ansan Greeners	Total		50	0	0	0	0	0	50	0
Jeju United	2019	K League 1	4	0	0	0	—		4	0
Gyeongnam	2020	K League 2	6	0	0	0	—		6	0
Gyeongnam	2021	K League 2	7	0	1	0	—		8	0
Gyeongnam	Total		13	0	1	0	0	0	14	0
FC Seoul	2022	K League 1	1	0	1	0	—		2	0
FC Seoul	2023	K League 1	1	0	0	0	—		1	0
FC Seoul	2024	K League 1	1	0	0	0	—		1	0
FC Seoul	Total		3	0	1	0	0	0	4	0
Incheon United	2025	K League 2	0	0	2	0	—		2	0
Yongin FC	2026	K League 2	13	0	0	0	—		13	0
Career total			174	0	5	0	3	0	182	0

== Honours ==
Incheon United

- K League 2: 2025
