= Kim Ju-sung =

South Korean footballer (born 2000)

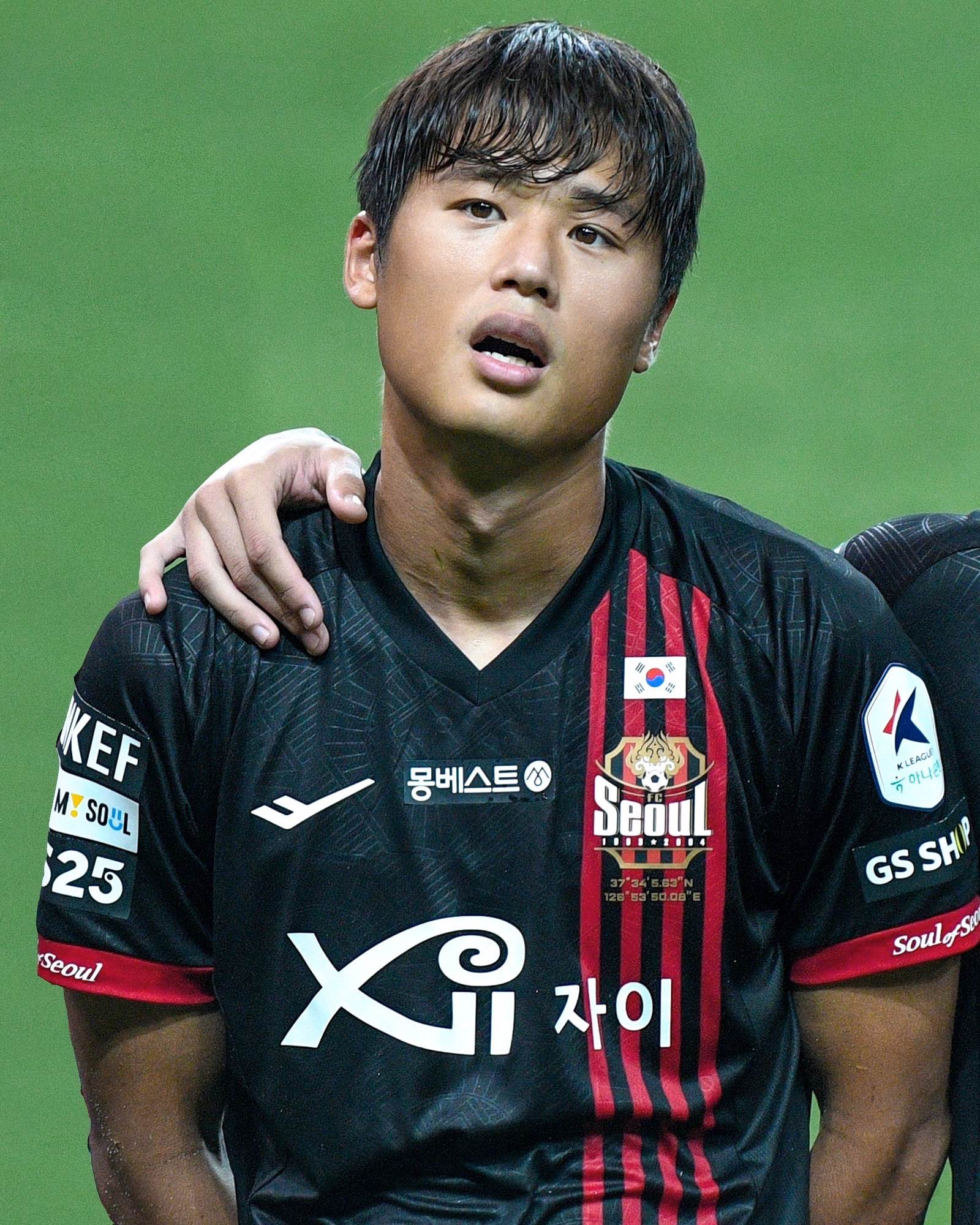
- Kim in 2024

Personal information
- Date of birth: 12 December 2000 (age 25)
- Place of birth: Cheongju, South Korea
- Height: 1.89 m (6 ft 2 in)
- Position: Centre-back

Team information
- Current team: Sanfrecce Hiroshima
- Number: 37

Youth career
- 2013–2015: Osan Middle School (Youth)
- 2016–2018: Osan High School (Youth)

Senior career*
Years	Team	Apps	(Gls)
2019–2025	FC Seoul	114	(2)
2021–2022	→ Gimcheon Sangmu (draft)	15	(0)
2025–	Sanfrecce Hiroshima	15	(1)

International career^{‡}
2015–2016	South Korea U17	9	(0)
2019	South Korea U20	2	(0)
2021	South Korea U23	5	(0)
2022–	South Korea	8	(1)
Medal record
Men's football
Representing South Korea
EAFF Championship
Runner-up	2022 Japan	Team
FIFA U-20 World Cup
Runner-up	2019 Poland
- * Club domestic league appearances and goals as of 8 November 2026 ‡ National team caps and goals as of 31 March 2026

- Kim Ju-sung
- Hangul: 김주성
- Hanja: 金朱晟
- RR: Gim Juseong
- MR: Kim Chusŏng

Kim Ju-sung (Korean: 김주성; born 12 December 2000) is a South Korean footballer who plays as a left-footed centre-back for J1 League club Sanfrecce Hiroshima and the South Korea national team.

== Club career ==
Kim Ju-sung joined FC Seoul in 2019. He made his K League 1 debut on 13 July 2019.

== International career ==
Kim Ju-sung was selected to play for the South Korea under-20 team at the 2019 FIFA U-20 World Cup.

Kim Ju-sung was part of the South Korea squad at the 2022 EAFF E-1 Football Championship.

He scored his first international goal on 7 July 2025 against China during the 2025 EAFF E-1 Football Championship at the Yongin Mireu Stadium.

== Career statistics ==
=== Club ===
As of match played 8 November 2026

Appearances and goals by club, season and competition
Club	Season	League			National cup		League cup		Continental		Other		Total	
Club	Season	Division	Apps	Goals	Apps	Goals	Apps	Goals	Apps	Goals	Apps	Goals	Apps	Goals
FC Seoul	2019	K League 1	10	0	0	0	—		—		—		10	0
FC Seoul	2020	K League 1	13	0	1	0	—		2 (Note: Appearances in AFC Champions League Elite)	0	—		16	0
FC Seoul	2022	K League 1	5	0	3	0	—		—		—		8	0
FC Seoul	2023	K League 1	38	2	0	0	—		—		—		38	2
FC Seoul	2024	K League 1	25	0	1	0	—		—		—		26	0
FC Seoul	2025	K League 1	23	0	2	0	—		—		—		25	0
FC Seoul	Total		114	2	7	0	—		2	0	—		123	2
Gimcheon Sangmu (draft)	2021	K League 2	8	0	4	0	—		—		—		12	0
Gimcheon Sangmu (draft)	2022	K League 1	7	0	2	0	—		—		—		9	0
Gimcheon Sangmu (draft)	Total		15	0	6	0	—		—		—		21	0
Sanfrecce Hiroshima	2025	J1 League	8	1	1	0	—		3	0	—		12	1
Sanfrecce Hiroshima	2026–27	J1 League	7	0	0	0	3	0	2	0	7 (Note: Appearances in J1 100 Year Vision League)	0	19	0
Sanfrecce Hiroshima	Total		15	1	1	0	3	0	5	0	7	0	31	1
Career total			144	3	14	0	3	0	7	0	7	0	175	3

=== International ===
As of match played 31 March 2026

Appearances and goals by national team and year
National team	Year	Apps	Goals
South Korea
South Korea	2022	1	0
South Korea	2023	1	0
South Korea	2024	0	0
South Korea	2025	5	1
South Korea	2026	1	0
Total		8	1

Scores and results list South Korea's goal tally first.

List of international goals scored by Kim Ju-sung
No.	Date	Venue	Opponent	Score	Result	Competition
1	7 July 2025	Yongin Mireu Stadium, Yongin, South Korea	China	3–0	3–0	2025 EAFF Championship

== Honours ==
Gimcheon Sangmu

- K League 2: 2021

South Korea U20

- FIFA U-20 World Cup Runner-up: 2019
