= 2010 Seongnam Ilhwa Chunma season =

Seongnam Ilhwa Chunma
2010 season
- Chairman: Park Kyu-Nam
- Manager: Shin Tae-Yong
- K-League: 4th
- Korean FA Cup: Quarterfinal
- League Cup: Group Round
- Champions League: Champions
- Club World Cup: 4th
- Top goalscorer: League: Dženan Radončić (12); All: Mauricio Molina (24)
- Highest home attendance: 10,996 vs Al-Shabab (20 October)
- Lowest home attendance: 260 vs Yongin City (21 April)
- Average home league attendance: 4,129
Home colours	Away colours

The 2010 season was Seongnam Ilhwa Chunma's twenty-second season in the K-League in South Korea. Seongnam Ilhwa Chunma is competing in K-League, League Cup, Korean FA Cup and Champions League as previous season's runner-up.

== Squad ==
Note: Flags indicate national team as defined under FIFA eligibility rules; some limited exceptions apply. Players may hold more than one non-FIFA nationality.

No.	Pos.	Nation	Player
1	GK	KOR	Jung Sung-Ryong
2	DF	KOR	Ko Jae-Sung
3	DF	KOR	Yoon Young-Sun
4	DF	AUS	Saša Ognenovski
5	DF	KOR	Cho Byung-Kuk
6	DF	KOR	Jeon Kwang-Jin
8	FW	KOR	Choi Sung-Kuk
9	FW	KOR	Cho Dong-Geon
10	FW	MNE	Dženan Radončić
11	MF	COL	Mauricio Molina
13	DF	KOR	Jeong Ho-Jeong
14	FW	KOR	Song Ho-Young
16	MF	KOR	Kim Sung-hwan
17	MF	KOR	Kim Cheol-Ho
18	FW	KOR	Namkung Do
19	MF	KOR	Shin Young-Chol
20	FW	KOR	Kim Jin-Ryong
21	GK	KOR	Jung Eui-Do

No.	Pos.	Nation	Player
22	DF	KOR	Hong Chul
24	DF	KOR	Kim Tae-Youn
25	DF	KOR	Lee Chi-Joon
26	DF	KOR	Jang Suk-Won
27	MF	KOR	Choi Jae-Young
28	MF	KOR	Moon Dae-Sung
29	MF	KOR	Park Sang-Hyeon
30	MF	KOR	Jo Jae-Cheol
31	GK	KOR	Lee Sang-Ki
32	MF	KOR	Park Sang-Hee
34	MF	KOR	Min Byeong-Jun
35	MF	KOR	Lee Su-Jae
36	FW	KOR	Kim Dong-Jin
38	DF	KOR	Yong Hyun-Jin
39	MF	KOR	Lee Sun-Suk
41	GK	KOR	Kang Sung-Kwan
44	MF	KOR	Hong Jin-Sub

== K-League ==
Date	Opponents	H / A	Result F – A	Scorers	Attendance	League position
27 February	Gangwon FC	H	3 – 0	Fabricio 49', Molina 56', 87'	4,162	2nd
14 March	Incheon United	H	6 – 0	Fabricio 3', 51', Molina 46', Radončić 55', Jeon Kwang-Jin 58', Jo Jae-Cheol 87'	4,332	2nd
19 March	Jeonbuk Hyundai Motors	A	1 – 1	Radončić 2'	10,647	3rd
27 March	Busan I'Park	H	1 – 1	Radončić 42'	1,256	4th
4 April	Jeju United	A	1 – 1	Jang Hak-Young 66'	2,931	6th
9 April	Suwon Samsung Bluewings	A	2 – 1	Jo Jae-Cheol 8', 23'	18,241	4th
18 April	Gyeongnam FC	H	1 – 2	Radončić 50'	5,679	6th
24 April	Gwangju Sangmu	A	2 – 0	Radončić 7', Jang Hak-Young 20'	3,572	5th
2 May	Pohang Steelers	H	3 – 0	Molina 6', Saša 58', Kim Cheol-Ho 82'	7,681	3rd
5 May	FC Seoul	A	0 – 4		60,747	5th
8 May	Chunnam Dragons	H	4 – 0	Radončić 34', Fabricio 54', 90+1', Kim Cheol-Ho 86'	3,138	3rd
18 July	Ulsan Hyundai	A	1 – 0	Molina 82'	7,325	2nd
24 July	Daejeon Citizen	A	1 – 0	Jo Jae-Cheol 64'	3,836	2nd
31 July	Daegu FC	H	1 – 3	Cho Dong-Geon 18'	6,115	5th
8 August	Pohang Steelers	A	0 – 2		13,213	6th
14 August	Incheon United	A	4 – 1	Molina 16', 28', 59', Moon Dae-Sung 74'	5,232	4th
22 August	Ulsan Hyundai	H	2 – 0	Radončić 47', Moon Dae-Sung 90+1'	2,697	4th
28 August	Jeonbuk Hyundai Motors	H	1 – 0	Radončić 28'	3,089	2nd
1 September	Suwon Samsung Bluewings	H	0 – 0		3,986	1st
4 September	Daegu FC	A	2 – 2	Kim Cheol-Ho 48', Namgung Do 85'	12,257	3rd
18 September	Jeju United	H	0 – 1		5,686	4th
26 September	Gangwon FC	A	2 – 1	Hong Chul 50', Molina 81'	5,112	4th
9 October	Busan I'Park	A	0 – 0		4,275	3rd
15 October	Daejeon Citizen	H	0 – 0		2,849	3rd
27 October	Chunnam Dragons	A	3 – 0	Radončić 24', 34', Molina 86'	6,454	3rd
30 October	Gwangju Sangmu	H	2 – 2	Saša 23'(pen), Namgung Do 69'	2,039	4th
3 November	FC Seoul	H	1 – 2	Cho Dong-Geon 16'	5,098	4th
7 November	Gyeongnam FC	A	2 – 2	Kim Sung-hwan 23', Radončić 87'	11,496	5th

Pos	Team	Pld	W	D	L	GF	GA	GD	Pts	Qualification
3	Jeonbuk Hyundai Motors	28	15	6	7	54	36	+18	51	Qualification for the playoffs first round
4	Ulsan Hyundai	28	15	5	8	47	30	+17	50	Qualification for the playoffs first round
5	Seongnam Ilhwa Chunma	28	13	9	6	46	26	+20	48	Qualification for the playoffs first round
6	Gyeongnam FC	28	13	9	6	41	32	+9	48	Qualification for the playoffs first round
7	Suwon Samsung Bluewings	28	12	5	11	39	44	−5	41	Qualification for the Champions League (Note: Qualified as champions of the FA Cup.)

Source: K League (in Korean)
Rules for classification: 1) Points; 2) Goal difference; 3) Goals scored
Notes:

Pos	Team	Qualification
1	FC Seoul (C)	Qualification for the Champions League
2	Jeju United	Qualification for the Champions League
3	Jeonbuk Hyundai Motors	Qualification for the Champions League
4	Seongnam Ilhwa Chunma	
5	Ulsan Hyundai	
6	Gyeongnam FC	

Source: RSSSF
(C) Champions

=== Championship ===
Date	Round	Opponents	H / A	Result F – A	Scorers	Attendance
21 November	First round	Ulsan Hyundai	A	3 – 1	Saša 27'(pen), Radončić 66', Molina 71'	25,090
24 November	Second round	Jeonbuk Hyundai Motors	A	0 – 1		7,976

== Korean FA Cup ==
Date	Round	Opponents	H / A	Result F – A	Scorers	Attendance
21 April	Round of 32	Yongin City	H	1 – 0	Own goal 58'	260
21 July	Round of 16	Daejeon Citizen	A	3 – 0	Song Ho-Young 44', Molina 65', 89'	1,001
18 August	Quarterfinal	Jeju United	H	0 – 2		1,214

== League Cup ==
=== Group stage ===
Pos	Team	Pld	W	D	L	GF	GA	GD	Pts	SEO	JJU	USH	SIC	GWJ
1	FC Seoul	4	2	2	0	8	2	+6	8	—	5–1	—	2–0	—
2	Jeju United	4	2	1	1	7	7	0	7	—	—	3–1	—	2–0
3	Ulsan Hyundai	4	1	2	1	7	7	0	5	1–1	—	—	—	2–0
4	Seongnam Ilhwa Chunma	4	0	3	1	5	7	−2	3	—	1–1	3–3	—	—
5	Gwangju Sangmu	4	0	2	2	1	5	−4	2	0–0	—	—	1–1	—

Source: RSSSF

Date	Opponents	H / A	Result F – A	Scorers	Attendance	Group position
23 May	Ulsan Hyundai	H	3 – 3	Molina 34', Hong Chul 55', Jeon Kwang-Jin 73'	2,269	1st
26 May	FC Seoul	A	0 – 2		10,436	4th
29 May	Jeju United	H	1 – 1	Radončić 82'	3,002	4th
2 June	Gwangju Sangmu	A	1 – 1	Jang Hak-Young 38'	1,538	3rd

== Champions League ==
=== Group stage ===
Pos	Team	Pld	W	D	L	GF	GA	GD	Pts	Qualification	SEO	BEI	KAW	MEL
1	(South Korea) Seongnam Ilhwa Chunma	6	5	0	1	11	6	+5	15	Advance to knockout stage	—	3–1	2–0	3–2
2	(China) Beijing Guoan	6	3	1	2	7	5	+2	10	Advance to knockout stage	0–1	—	2–0	1–0
3	(Japan) Kawasaki Frontale	6	2	0	4	8	8	0	6		3–0	1–3	—	4–0
4	(Australia) Melbourne Victory	6	1	1	4	3	10	−7	4		0–2	0–0	1–0	—

Source: AFC Champions League Official Page

Date	Opponents	H / A	Result F – A	Scorers	Attendance	Group position
23 February 2010	(Japan) Kawasaki Frontale	H	2 – 0	Molina 35', Radončić 78'	4,983	1st
9 March 2010	(Australia) Melbourne Victory	A	2 – 0	Saša 40', Yoon Young-Sun 85'	7,899	1st
23 March 2010	(China) Beijing Guoan	H	3 – 1	Song Ho-Young 79', Radončić 87', Jo Jae-Cheol 90+7'	1,224	1st
31 March 2010	(China) Beijing Guoan	A	1 – 0	Molina 73'	31,200	1st
14 April 2010	(Japan) Kawasaki Frontale	A	0 – 3		10,403	1st
28 May 2010	(Australia) Melbourne Victory	H	3 – 2	Jeon Kwang-Jin 27', Namgung Do 72', Jo Jae-Cheol 83'	502	1st

=== Knockout stage ===
Date	Round	Opponents	H / A	Result F – A	Scorers	Attendance
11 May	Round of 16	(Japan) Gamba Osaka	H	3 – 0	Molina 75'(pen), 90+1', Song Ho-Young 84'	9,368
15 September	Quarterfinal 1st leg	(South Korea) Suwon Samsung Bluewings	H	4 – 1	Radončić 8', 66', Molina 33', Own goal 82'	7,462
21 September	Quarterfinal 2nd leg	(South Korea) Suwon Samsung Bluewings	A	0 – 2		13,076
5 October	Semifinal 1st leg	(Saudi Arabia) Al-Shabab	A	3 – 4	Molina 4', 69', Jo Jae-Cheol 26'	9,300
20 October	Semifinal 2nd leg	(Saudi Arabia) Al-Shabab	H	1 – 0	Cho Dong-Geon 31'	10,996
13 November	Final	(Iran) Zob Ahan	N	3 - 1	Saša 29', Cho Byung-Kuk 53', Kim Cheol-Ho 83'	27,308

== Club World Cup ==
Date	Round	Opponents	H / A	Result F – A	Scorers	Attendance
11 December	Quarter-finals	(United Arab Emirates) Al-Wahda	N	4 – 1	Molina 4', Saša 30', Choi Sung-Kuk 71', Cho Dong-Geon 81'	30,625
15 December	Semi-finals	(Italy) Internazionale	N	0 – 3		35,995
18 December	Third place match	(Brazil) Internacional	N	2 – 4	Molina 84', 90+3'	16,563

== Squad statistics ==
=== Appearances and goals ===
Statistics accurate as of match played 18 December 2010

No.	Nat.	Pos.	Name	League		FA Cup		League Cup		Asia		FIFA Club World Cup		Appearances		Goals
No.	Nat.	Pos.	Name	Apps	Goals	Apps	Goals	Apps	Goals	Apps	Goals	Apps	Goals	App (sub)	Total	Goals
1	(South Korea)	GK	Jung Sung-Ryong	30	0	3	0	0	0	12	0	3	0	48 (0)	48	0
2	(South Korea)	DF	Ko Jae-Seong	11 (5)	0	2	0	1	0	6 (2)	0	3	0	23 (7)	30	0
3	(South Korea)	DF	Yoon Young-Sun	4 (1)	0	2	0	0	0	3	1	1	0	10 (1)	11	1
4	(Australia)	DF	Saša Ognenovski	25	3	2	0	4	0	11	2	2	1	44 (0)	44	6
5	(South Korea)	DF	Cho Byung-Kuk	26	0	2	0	4	0	9	1	2	0	43 (0)	43	1
6	(South Korea)	DF	Jeon Kwang-Jin	27 (1)	1	3	0	4	1	10	1	1 (2)	0	45 (3)	48	3
8	(South Korea)	FW	Choi Sung-Kuk	3 (1)	0	0	0	0	0	0	0	3	1	6 (1)	7	1
9	(South Korea)	FW	Cho Dong-Geon	14 (4)	2	1 (1)	0	0	0	3 (2)	1	3	1	21 (7)	28	4
10	(Montenegro)	FW	Dženan Radončić	24 (3)	12	3	0	4	1	10	4	2 (1)	0	43 (4)	47	17
11	(Colombia)	MF	Mauricio Molina	27 (2)	11	3	2	4	1	10 (1)	7	3	3	47 (3)	50	24
13	(South Korea)	DF	Jeong Ho-Jeong	0	0	0	0	0	0	0	0	0	0	0	0	0
14	(South Korea)	FW	Song Ho-Young	7 (18)	0	0 (3)	1	0 (4)	0	3 (9)	2	1 (2)	0	11 (36)	47	3
16	(South Korea)	MF	Kim Sung-hwan	29	1	3	0	3	0	11	0	3	0	49 (0)	49	1
17	(South Korea)	MF	Kim Chul-Ho	18 (5)	3	1 (1)	0	2 (2)	0	10 (2)	1	-	-	31 (10)	41	4
18	(South Korea)	FW	Namgung Do	6 (14)	2	0 (1)	0	0 (2)	0	4 (5)	1	0	0	10 (22)	32	3
19	(South Korea)	MF	Sin Young-Chul	0	0	0	0	0	0	0	0	-	-	0	0	0
20	(South Korea)	FW	Kim Jin-Ryong	6 (5)	0	0	0	0	0	5 (1)	0	0 (3)	0	11 (9)	20	0
21	(South Korea)	GK	Jung Eui-Do	0	0	0	0	1	0	0	0	-	-	1 (0)	1	0
22	(South Korea)	DF	Hong Chul	17 (1)	1	2 (1)	0	4	1	9	0	3	0	35 (2)	37	2
24	(South Korea)	DF	Kim Tae-Yoon	8	0	0	0	0 (1)	0	1	0	-	-	9 (1)	10	0
25	(South Korea)	DF	Lee Chi-Joon	0	0	0	0	0	0	0	0	-	-	0	0	0
26	(South Korea)	DF	Jang Suk-Won	0 (3)	0	0	0	0	0	0	0	1	0	1 (3)	4	0
27	(South Korea)	MF	Choi Jae-Young	0	0	0	0	0	0	0	0	-	-	0	0	0
28	(South Korea)	MF	Moon Dae-Sung	1 (8)	2	0 (1)	0	0	0	0 (2)	0	-	-	1 (11)	12	2
29	(South Korea)	MF	Park Sang-Hyeon	0	0	0	0	0	0	0	0	-	-	0	0	0
30	(South Korea)	MF	Jo Jae-Cheol	18 (11)	4	2 (1)	0	3 (1)	0	4 (7)	3	2 (1)	0	29 (21)	50	7
31	(South Korea)	GK	Lee Sang-Ki	0	0	0	0	0	0	0	0	0	0	0	0	0
32	(South Korea)	MF	Park Sang-Hee	4 (1)	0	1	0	0 (1)	0	1 (1)	0	0	0	6 (3)	9	0
34	(South Korea)	MF	Min Byeong-Jun	0	0	0	0	0	0	0	0	-	-	0	0	0
35	(South Korea)	MF	Lee Su-Jae	0	0	0	0	0	0	0	0	-	-	0	0	0
36	(South Korea)	FW	Kim Dong-Jin	0	0	1	0	0	0	0	0	-	-	1 (0)	1	0
38	(South Korea)	DF	Yong Hyun-Jin	6 (1)	0	0	0	0	0	0	0	0	0	6 (1)	7	0
39	(South Korea)	MF	Lee Sun-Suk	0	0	0	0	0	0	0	0	-	-	0	0	0
41	(South Korea)	GK	Kang Sung-Kwan	0	0	0	0	3	0	0	0	0	0	3 (0)	3	0
44	(South Korea)	MF	Hong Jin-Sub	0	0	0	0	0	0	0	0	-	-	0	0	0
8	(Brazil)	MF	Fabrício (out)	8	5	1	0	3	0	6	0	-	-	18 (0)	18	5
33	(South Korea)	DF	Jang Hak-Young (out)	11	2	1	0	4	1	4	0	-	-	20 (0)	20	3

=== Top scorers ===
Position	Nation	Number	Name	K-League	KFA Cup	League Cup	Champions League	Club World Cup	Total
1	(Colombia)	11	Mauricio Molina	11	2	1	7	3	24
2	(Montenegro)	10	Dženan Radončić	12	0	1	4	0	17
3	(South Korea)	30	Jo Jae-Cheol	4	0	0	3	0	7
4	(Australia)	4	Saša Ognenovski	3	0	0	2	1	6
5	(Brazil)	8	Fabrício Eduardo Souza	5	0	0	0	0	5
6	(South Korea)	17	Kim Cheol-Ho	3	0	0	1	0	4
=	(South Korea)	9	Cho Dong-Geon	2	0	0	1	1	4
7	(South Korea)	18	Namgung Do	2	0	0	1	0	3
=	(South Korea)	33	Jang Hak-Young	2	0	1	0	0	3
=	(South Korea)	6	Jeon Kwang-Jin	1	0	1	1	0	3
=	(South Korea)	14	Song Ho-Young	0	1	0	2	0	3
8	(South Korea)	28	Moon Dae-Sung	2	0	0	0	0	2
=	(South Korea)	22	Hong Chul	1	0	1	0	0	2
9	(South Korea)	16	Kim Sung-hwan	1	0	0	0	0	1
=	(South Korea)	8	Choi Sung-Kuk	0	0	0	0	1	1
=	(South Korea)	3	Yoon Young-Sun	0	0	0	1	0	1
=	(South Korea)	5	Cho Byung-Kuk	0	0	0	1	0	1
/	/	/	Own Goals	0	1	0	1	0	2
			TOTALS	49	4	5	25	6	89

=== Discipline ===
Position	Nation	Number	Name	K-League		KFA Cup		League Cup		Champions League		Club World Cup		Total	
Position	Nation	Number	Name	Booked	Sent off (straight red)	Booked	Sent off (straight red)	Booked	Sent off (straight red)	Booked	Sent off (straight red)	Booked	Sent off (straight red)	Booked	Sent off (straight red)
GK	(South Korea)	1	Jung Sung-Ryong	2	0	0	0	0	0	0	0	0	0	2	0
DF	(South Korea)	2	Ko Jae-Seong	3	0	0	0	0	0	1	0	0	0	4	0
DF	(South Korea)	3	Yoon Young-Sun	0	0	1	0	0	0	1	0	0	0	2	0
DF	(Australia)	4	Saša Ognenovski	6	0	2	0	1	1	3	1	2	0	14	2
DF	(South Korea)	5	Cho Byung-Kuk	5	0	0	0	0	0	1	0	0	0	6	0
DF	(South Korea)	6	Jeon Kwang-Jin	6	0	0	0	1	0	4	0	0	0	11	0
MF	(Brazil)	8	Fabrício Eduardo Souza	4	0	0	0	2	0	0	0	0	0	6	0
FW	(South Korea)	8	Choi Sung-Kuk	1	0	0	0	0	0	0	0	0	0	1	0
FW	(South Korea)	9	Cho Dong-Geon	1	0	0	0	0	0	0	0	0	0	1	0
FW	(Montenegro)	10	Dženan Radončić	6	0	0	0	1	0	2	0	0	0	9	0
MF	(Colombia)	11	Mauricio Molina	5	0	0	0	1	0	0	0	0	0	6	0
FW	(South Korea)	14	Song Ho-Young	3	0	0	0	0	0	0	0	0	0	3	0
MF	(South Korea)	16	Kim Sung-hwan	7	0	0	0	0	0	2	0	0	0	9	0
MF	(South Korea)	17	Kim Chul-Ho	3	0	0	0	0	0	1	0	0	0	4	0
FW	(South Korea)	18	Namgung Do	1	0	0	0	0	0	0	0	0	0	1	0
FW	(South Korea)	20	Kim Jin-Yong	1	0	0	0	0	0	1	0	0	0	2	0
MF	(South Korea)	22	Hong Chul	1	0	0	0	1	0	0	0	0	0	2	0
DF	(South Korea)	26	Jang Suk-Won	0	0	0	0	0	0	0	0	2	1	2	1
MF	(South Korea)	28	Moon Dae-Sung	1	0	0	0	0	0	0	0	0	0	1	0
FW	(South Korea)	30	Jo Jae-Cheol	3	0	1	0	1	0	1	0	1	0	7	0
MF	(South Korea)	32	Park Sang-Hee	0	0	1	0	0	0	0	0	0	0	1	0
DF	(South Korea)	33	Jang Hak-Young	1	0	1	0	0	0	0	0	0	0	2	0
DF	(South Korea)	38	Yong Hyun-Jin	4	1	0	0	0	0	0	0	0	0	4	1
/	/	/	TOTALS	64	1	6	0	8	1	17	1	5	1	100	4

== Transfer ==
=== In ===
- (South Korea) Jang Suk-Won (Dankook Univ.) — 2008 Draft Preferred Nomination (Pungsaeng HS)
- (South Korea) Hong Chul (Dankook Univ.) — 2009 Draft Preferred Nomination (Pungsaeng HS)
- (South Korea) Yoon Young-Sun (Dankook Univ.) — 2010 Draft Round 1
- (South Korea) Jo Jae-Cheol (Ajou Univ.) — 2010 Draft Round 2
- (South Korea) Jeong Ho-Jeong (Kwangwoon Univ.) — 2010 Draft Round 4
- (South Korea) Park Sang-Hee (Sangji Univ.) — 2010 Draft Round 5
- (South Korea) Yong Hyun-Jin (Konkuk Univ.) — 2010 Draft Round 6
- (South Korea) Kim Dong-Jin (Sangji Univ.) — 2010 Draft Supplement 1
- (South Korea) Park Sang-Hyeon (Korea Univ.) — 2010 Draft Supplement 2
- (South Korea) Lee Su-Jae (Yonsei Univ.) — 2010 Draft Supplement 3
- (South Korea) Min Byeong-Jun (Kyonggi Univ.) — 2010 Draft Supplement 4
- (South Korea) Lee Sang-Ki (Sungkyunkwan Univ.) — 2010 Draft Supplement 5
- (South Korea) Lee Sun-Suk (Yeoido HS) — 2010 Draft Supplement 6
- (South Korea) Namkung Do (Pohang Steelers) — Transfer (4 January 2010)
- (South Korea) Song Ho-Young (Gyeongnam FC) — Transfer (11 January 2010)
- (South Korea) Kang Sung-Kwan (Sangji Univ.) — Scout
- (South Korea) Choi Sung-Kuk (Gwangju Sangmu) — Return because of military service end (30 October 2010)

=== Out ===
- (South Korea) Lee Ho (Al Ain Club) — Contract end (December 2009)
- (South Korea) Han Dong-Won (Montedio Yamagata) — Contract end (December 2009)
- (South Korea) Kim Jin-Hee — Release (December 2009)
- (South Korea) Park Kyuk-Po — Contract end (December 2009)
- (South Korea) Park Sung-Soo — Contract end (December 2009)
- (South Korea) Kim Kyung-Sub — Release (December 2009)
- (South Korea) Jeon Sang-Wook (Busan I'Park) — Contract end (December 2009)
- (South Korea) Lim Jae-Hoon — Release (December 2009)
- (South Korea) Ryu Hyung-Ryul (Cheonan City) — Contract end (December 2009)
- (South Korea) Kim Sung-Kyun (Gangwon FC) — Contract end (December 2009)
- (South Korea) Yoon Jae-Min — Contract end (December 2009)
- (South Korea) Lee Kyung-Min — Release (December 2009)
- (South Korea) Park Kwang-Min (Mokpo City) — Contract end (December 2009)
- (South Korea) Lee Won-Hee — Contract end (December 2009)
- (South Korea) Seo Seok-Won (Mokpo City) — Transfer (January 2010)
- (South Korea) Jin Min-Ho (Mokpo City) — Transfer (January 2010)
- (South Korea) Shin Dong-Keun (Goyang KB Kookmin Bank) — Transfer (January 2010)
- (South Korea) Kim Yong-Dae (FC Seoul) — Transfer (3 January 2010)
- (South Korea) Park Woo-Hyun (Busan I'Park) — Transfer (19 January 2010)
- (Brazil) Fabricio — Contract end (June 2010)
- (South Korea) Jang Hak-Young (Seoul United) — On loan because of military service for two years (23 July 2010)

== Honours ==
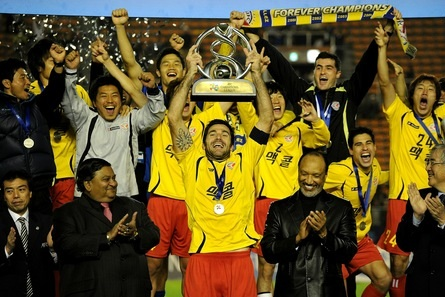
2010 AFC Champions League winner Seongnam Ilhwa Chunma.

=== Club ===
- AFC Champions League Winners

=== Individual ===
- K-League Best XI: (Australia) Saša, (Colombia) Molina
- AFC Champions League MVP: (Australia) Saša
- FIFA Club World Cup Top Scorer: (Colombia) Molina (3 goals)
