= 2009 Seongnam Ilhwa Chunma season =

Seongnam Ilhwa Chunma
209 season
- Chairman: Park Kyu-Nam
- Manager: Shin Tae-Yong
- K-League: Runners-up
- Korean FA Cup: Runners-up
- League Cup: Quarterfinal
- Top goalscorer: League: Mauricio Molina (10); All: Mauricio Molina (11)
- Highest home attendance: 21,371 vs Jeonbuk (December 2)
- Lowest home attendance: 1,367 vs Gyeongnam (July 12)
- Average home league attendance: 8,683
Home colours	Away colours

The 2009 season was Seongnam Ilhwa Chunma's twenty-first season in the K-League in South Korea. Seongnam Ilhwa Chunma competed in K-League, League Cup and Korean FA Cup.

== Current squad ==
Note: Flags indicate national team as defined under FIFA eligibility rules; some limited exceptions apply. Players may hold more than one non-FIFA nationality.

No.	Pos.	Nation	Player
1	GK	KOR	Jung Sung-Ryong
2	DF	KOR	Ko Jae-Sung
3	DF	KOR	Seo Seok-Won
4	DF	AUS	Saša Ognenovski
5	DF	KOR	Cho Byung-Kuk
6	DF	KOR	Jeon Kwang-Jin
8	MF	KOR	Lee Ho
9	FW	KOR	Hong Jin-Sub
10	FW	MNE	Dženan Radončić
11	MF	COL	Mauricio Molina
12	MF	KOR	Choi Jae-Young
13	MF	KOR	Shin Dong-Keun
14	MF	KOR	Kim Jung-Woo
15	FW	KOR	Han Dong-Won
16	MF	KOR	Kim Sung-hwan
17	MF	KOR	Kim Cheol-Ho
18	FW	KOR	Cho Dong-Geon
19	MF	KOR	Shin Young-Chol
20	FW	KOR	Kim Jin-Ryong
21	GK	KOR	Jung Eui-Do

No.	Pos.	Nation	Player
22	FW	KOR	Moon Dae-Seong
23	MF	BRA	Fabrício
24	DF	KOR	Kim Jin-hee
25	DF	KOR	Lee Chi-Joon
27	FW	KOR	Jin Min-Ho
28	FW	KOR	Park Kyuk-Po
29	MF	KOR	Park Sung-Soo
30	MF	KOR	Kim Kyung-Sub
31	GK	KOR	Jeon Sang-Wook
32	MF	KOR	Lim Jae-Hoon
33	DF	KOR	Jang Hak-Young
34	DF	KOR	Ryu Hyung-Ryeol
35	MF	KOR	Kim Sung-Kyun
36	MF	KOR	Yoon Jae-Min
37	DF	KOR	Lee Kyung-Min
38	FW	KOR	Park Kwang-Min
39	DF	KOR	Kim Tae-Yoon
40	DF	KOR	Park Woo-Hyun
41	GK	KOR	Lee Won-Hee
44	GK	KOR	Kim Yong-Dae

== Match results ==
=== K-League ===
- NB: 3 & 17 round were rest rounds.

Date Round	Home	Score	Away	Location

8 March 1	Daegu	1 – 1	Seongnam Ilhwa Chunma	Suseong-gu, Daegu
15:00 UTC+9	Cho Hyung-Ik 22'	Report	Han Dong-Won 45+1'	Stadium: Daegu Stadium; Attendance: 15,429; Referee: Lee Sam-Ho

14 March 2	Seongnam Ilhwa Chunma	0 – 0	Ulsan Hyundai	Seongnam, Gyeonggi
14:00 UTC+9		Report		Stadium: Seongnam Stadium; Attendance: 16,144; Referee: Lee Min-Hu

4 April 4	Jeonbuk Hyundai Motors	4 – 1	Seongnam Ilhwa Chunma	Jeonju, Jeonbuk
15:00 UTC+9	Eninho 8' (pen.); Choi Tae-Uk 27', 32', 74'	Report	Cho Byung-Kuk 78'	Stadium: Jeonju World Cup Stadium; Attendance: 15,170; Referee: Lee Sam-Ho

11 April 5	Seongnam Ilhwa Chunma	3 – 1	Pohang Steelers	Seongnam, Gyeonggi
17:00 UTC+9	Lee Ho 38'; Cho Dong-Geon 2', 90+3'	Report	Kim Jae-Sung 11'	Stadium: Seongnam Stadium; Attendance: 3,829; Referee: Choi Myung-Yong

18 April 6	Daejeon Citizen	1 – 2	Seongnam Ilhwa Chunma	Yuseong-gu, Daejeon
17:00 UTC+9	Kim Seong-Jun 45'	Report	Kim Jin-Yong 78'; Lee Ho 82'	Stadium: Daejeon World Cup Stadium; Attendance: 3,535; Referee: Ryu Hee-Sun

26 April 7	Seongnam Ilhwa Chunma	2 – 0	Jeju United	Seongnam, Gyeonggi
15:00 UTC+9	Han Dong-Won 7'; Radončić 79'	Report		Stadium: Seongnam Stadium; Attendance: 2,783; Referee: Lee Young-Cheol

2 May 8	Seoul	1 – 0	Seongnam Ilhwa Chunma	Mapo-gu, Seoul
17:00 UTC+9	Kim Seung-Yong 19'	Report		Stadium: Seoul World Cup Stadium; Attendance: 10,256; Referee: Ko Keum-Bok

9 May 9	Seongnam Ilhwa Chunma	0 – 0	Busan I'Park	Seongnam, Gyeonggi
19:00 UTC+9		Report		Stadium: Seongnam Stadium; Attendance: 5,032; Referee: Kim Dong-Jin

17 May 10	Incheon United	1 – 0	Seongnam Ilhwa Chunma	Nam-gu, Incheon
17:00 UTC+9	Čadikovski 71'	Report		Stadium: Incheon Munhak Stadium; Attendance: 7,204; Referee: Lee Sang-Yong

23 May 11	Seongnam Ilhwa Chunma	3 – 1	Chunnam Dragons	Seongnam, Gyeonggi
19:00 UTC+9	Kim Jin-Yong 29'; Cho Dong-Geon 39', 86' (pen.)	Report	Lee Chun-Soo 57'	Stadium: Seongnam Stadium; Attendance: 7,325; Referee: Lee Jong-Kuk

21 June 12	Gangwon	4 – 1	Seongnam Ilhwa Chunma	Gangneung, Gangwon
20:00 UTC+9	Kim Bong-Kyum 43', 63'; Kim Young-Hoo 46'; Oh Won-Jong 82'	Report	Cho Dong-Geon 58'	Stadium: Gangneung Stadium; Attendance: 16,741; Referee: Choi Kwang-Bo

27 June 13	Seongnam Ilhwa Chunma	0 – 1	Gwangju Sangmu	Seongnam, Gyeonggi
19:00 UTC+9		Report	Choi Sung-Kuk 54'	Stadium: Seongnam Stadium; Attendance: 7,319; Referee: Yoo Byung-Sub

4 July 14	Suwon Samsung Bluewings	1 – 0	Seongnam Ilhwa Chunma	Suwon, Gyeonggi
19:30 UTC+9	Tiago 34'	Report		Stadium: Suwon World Cup Stadium; Attendance: 20,127; Referee: Choi Kwang-Bo

12 July 15	Seongnam Ilhwa Chunma	3 – 1	Gyeongnam	Seongnam, Gyeonggi
19:00 UTC+9	Kim Sung-hwan 56'; Kim Joo-Young 57' (o.g.); Han Dong-Won 86'	Report	Lee Hun 33'	Stadium: Seongnam Stadium; Attendance: 1,367; Referee: Lee Sam-Ho

18 July 16	Ulsan Hyundai	0 – 0	Seongnam Ilhwa Chunma	Nam-gu, Ulsan
19:00 UTC+9		Report		Stadium: Ulsan Munsu Football Stadium; Attendance: 13,761; Referee: Hong Jin-Ho

2 August 18	Seongnam Ilhwa Chunma	3 – 1	Jeonbuk Hyundai Motors	Seongnam, Gyeonggi
19:00 UTC+9	Radončić 46'; Kim Jung-Woo 64', 82'	Report	Eninho 11' (pen.)	Stadium: Seongnam Stadium; Attendance: 11,239; Referee: Ko Keum-Bok

15 August 19	Pohang Steelers	1 – 1	Seongnam Ilhwa Chunma	Pohang, Gyeongbuk
19:30 UTC+9	No Byung-Jun 50'	Report	Molina 90' (pen.)	Stadium: Steelyard Stadium; Attendance: 15,637; Referee: Yoo Seon-Ho

23 August 20	Seongnam Ilhwa Chunma	1 – 2	Daejeon Citizen	Seongnam, Gyeonggi
19:00 UTC+9	Cho Byung-Kuk 62'	Report	Kim Han-Seob 35'; Ko Chang-Hyun 59'	Stadium: Seongnam Stadium; Attendance: 5,513; Referee: Kim Dong-Jin

30 August 21	Jeju United	1 – 2	Seongnam Ilhwa Chunma	Jeju City, Jeju
15:00 UTC+9	Ricardo 90'	Report	Kim Jin-Yong 59'; Radončić 79'	Stadium: Jeju Stadium; Attendance: 1,872; Referee: Lee Jong-Guk

6 September 22	Seongnam Ilhwa Chunma	1 – 0	Seoul	Seongnam, Gyeonggi
19:00 UTC+9	Kim Sung-hwan 5'	Report		Stadium: Seongnam Stadium; Attendance: 13,970; Referee: Lee Sang-Yong

12 September 23	Busan I'Park	1 – 2	Seongnam Ilhwa Chunma	Yeonje-gu, Busan
20:00 UTC+9	Rômulo 46'	Report	Molina 24' (pen.); Kim Jin-Yong 72'	Stadium: Busan Asiad Stadium; Attendance: 9,713; Referee: Ahn Yong-Hee

19 September 24	Seongnam Ilhwa Chunma	1 – 1	Incheon United	Seongnam, Gyeonggi
19:00 UTC+9	Kim Jung-Woo 23'	Report	Yoo Byung-Soo 90+1'	Stadium: Seongnam Stadium; Attendance: 6,209; Referee: Moon Jin-Hee

26 September 25	Chunnam Dragons	2 – 0	Seongnam Ilhwa Chunma	Gwangyang, Jeonnam
19:00 UTC+9	Chuva 17' (pen.), 29'	Report		Stadium: Gwangyang Football Stadium; Attendance: 19,800; Referee: Ryu Hee-Sun

3 October 26	Seongnam Ilhwa Chunma	3 – 0	Gangwon	Seongnam, Gyeonggi
19:00 UTC+9	Ognenovski 42'; Cho Dong-Geon 75'; Molina 84'	Report		Stadium: Seongnam Stadium; Attendance: 8,701; Referee: Lee Jong-Guk

11 October 27	Gwangju Sangmu	2 – 3	Seongnam Ilhwa Chunma	Seo-gu, Gwangju
15:00 UTC+9	Choi Sung-Kuk 10'; Kim Myung-Joong 15'	Report	Molina 23'; Kim Sung-hwan 35'; Han Dong-Won 65'	Stadium: Gwangju World Cup Stadium; Attendance: 4,383; Referee: Lee Sang-Yong

18 October 28	Seongnam Ilhwa Chunma	3 – 2	Suwon Samsung Bluewings	Seongnam, Gyeonggi
17:00 UTC+9	Molina 9'; Ognenovski 41'; Radončić 67'	Report	Li Weifeng 20'; Kim Do-Heon 70'	Stadium: Seongnam Stadium; Attendance: 17,049; Referee: Ko Keum-Bok

25 October 29	Gyeongnam	4 – 1	Seongnam Ilhwa Chunma	Changwon, Gyeongnam
15:00 UTC+9	Lee Yong-Rae 2'; Índio 23'; Kim Dong-Chan 30'; Song Ho-Young 90+2'	Report	Molina 83' (pen.)	Stadium: Changwon Civic Stadium; Attendance: 17,934; Referee: Lee Young-Cheol

1 November 30	Seongnam Ilhwa Chunma	3 – 0	Daegu	Seongnam, Gyeonggi
15:00 UTC+9	Kim Sung-hwan 41'; Molina 65', 76'	Report		Stadium: Seongnam Stadium; Attendance: 4,355; Referee: Lee Sang-Yong

==== League table ====
Pos	Team	Pld	W	D	L	GF	GA	GD	Pts	Qualification
2	Pohang Steelers	28	14	11	3	55	33	+22	53	Qualification for the playoffs semi-final
3	FC Seoul	28	16	5	7	47	27	+20	53	Qualification for the playoffs first round
4	Seongnam Ilhwa Chunma	28	13	6	9	40	34	+6	45	Qualification for the playoffs first round
5	Incheon United	28	11	10	7	31	29	+2	43	Qualification for the playoffs first round
6	Jeonnam Dragons	28	11	9	8	41	39	+2	42	Qualification for the playoffs first round

Source: K League (in Korean)
Rules for classification: 1) Points; 2) Goal difference; 3) Goals scored

Pos	Team	Qualification
1	Jeonbuk Hyundai Motors (C)	Qualification for the Champions League
2	Seongnam Ilhwa Chunma	Qualification for the Champions League
3	Pohang Steelers	Qualification for the Champions League
4	Jeonnam Dragons	
5	FC Seoul	
6	Incheon United	

Source: RSSSF
(C) Champions

==== Results summary ====
Overall								Home						Away					
Pld	W	D	L	GF	GA	GD	Pts	W	D	L	GF	GA	GD	W	D	L	GF	GA	GD
28	13	6	9	40	34	+6	45	9	3	2	26	10	+16	4	3	7	14	24	−10

==== Results by round ====
Round	1	2	3	4	5	6	7	8	9	10	11	12	13	14	15	16	17	18	19	20	21	22	23	24	25	26	27	28	29	30
Ground	A	H		A	H	A	H	A	H	A	H	A	H	A	H	A		H	A	H	A	H	A	H	A	H	A	H	A	H
Result	D	D		L	W	W	W	L	D	L	W	L	L	L	W	D		W	D	L	W	W	W	D	L	W	W	W	L	L
Position	6	9	9	12	10	5	5	5	6	7	6	7	8	8	7	8	9	8	8	8	8	7	4	4	5	4	4	4	4	4

Updated to match(es) played on 1 November 2009. Source: League Fixtures and Results
A = Away; H = Home; W = Win; D = Draw; L = Loss

==== Championship Play-offs ====
22 November First Round	Seongnam Ilhwa Chunma	1 – 1 (a.e.t.) (3 – 2 p)	Incheon United	Seongnam, Gyeonggi
14:30 UTC+9	Radončić 100'	Report	Kim Min-Soo 112'	Stadium: Seongnam Stadium; Attendance: 10,946; Referee: Ko Keum-Bok
	Penalties
	Radončić (penalty missed); Cho Dong-Geon (penalty scored); Jung Sung-Ryong (penalty missed); Molina (penalty scored); Kim Yong-Dae (penalty scored)		(penalty missed) Yoo Byung-Soo; (penalty scored) Ahn Jae-Joon; (penalty scored) Lee Se-Joo; (penalty missed) Jeong Hyuk; (penalty missed) Čadikovski

25 November Second Round	Seongnam Ilhwa Chunma	1 – 0	Chunnam Dragons	Seongnam, Gyeonggi
19:00 UTC+9	Molina 23'	Report		Stadium: Seongnam Stadium; Attendance: 12,283; Referee: Lee Young-Cheol

29 November Semifinal	Pohang Steelers	0 – 1	Seongnam Ilhwa Chunma	Pohang, Gyeongbuk
15:00 UTC+9		Report	Molina 44'	Stadium: Steelyard Stadium; Attendance: 16,854; Referee: Choi Myung-Yong

2 December Championship 1st	Seongnam Ilhwa Chunma	0 – 0	Jeonbuk Hyundai Motors	Seongnam, Gyeonggi
19:00 UTC+9		Report		Stadium: Seongnam Stadium; Attendance: 21,371; Referee: Lee Sang-Yong

6 December Championship 2nd	Jeonbuk Hyundai Motors	3 – 1	Seongnam Ilhwa Chunma	Jeonju, Jeonbuk
14:00 UTC+9	Eninho 21', 39'; Lee Dong-Gook 72' (pen.)	Report	Kim Jin-Yong 84'	Stadium: Jeonju World Cup Stadium; Attendance: 36,246; Referee: Choi Kwang-Bo

=== Korean FA Cup ===
13 May Round of 32	Seongnam Ilhwa Chunma	5 – 2	Busan Transportation Corporation	Seongnam, Gyeonggi
19:30 UTC+9	Mota 4', 56', 78'; Han Dong-Won 49'; Cho Dong-Geon 79'		Ha Tae-Keun 24'; Jang Ji-Soo 84'	Stadium: Seongnam Stadium; Referee: Kim Wan-Tae

1 July Round of 16	Seongnam Ilhwa Chunma	1 – 0	Chung-Ang University	Seongnam, Gyeonggi
19:30 UTC+9	Kim Jung-Woo 90+1'			Stadium: Seongnam Stadium; Referee: Kim Sung-Ho

15 September Quarterfinal	Seongnam Ilhwa Chunma	2 – 1	Pohang Steelers	Seongnam, Gyeonggi
19:30 UTC+9	Radončić 8'; Kim Jin-Yong 69'		Park Hee-Chul 37'	Stadium: Seongnam Stadium; Referee: Kim Dong-Jin

7 October Semifinal	Daejeon Citizen	0 – 1	Seongnam Ilhwa Chunma	Yuseong-gu, Daejeon
19:30 UTC+9			Molina 30'	Stadium: Daejeon World Cup Stadium; Referee: Lee Min-Hu

8 November Final	Seongnam Ilhwa Chunma	1 – 1 (a.e.t.) (2 – 4 p)	Suwon Samsung Bluewings	Seongnam, Gyeonggi
14:00 UTC+9	Radončić 27'		Edu 88' (pen.)	Stadium: Seongnam Stadium; Referee: Choi Kwang-Bo
	Penalties
	Ognenovski (penalty scored); Radončić (penalty scored); Kim Sung-hwan (penalty missed); Jeon Kwang-Jin (penalty missed)		(penalty scored) Edu; (penalty scored) Yang Sang-Min; (penalty missed) Tiago; (penalty scored) Kim Do-Heon; (penalty scored) Kim Dae-Eui

=== League Cup ===
25 March Group Round	Gangwon	0 – 2	Seongnam Ilhwa Chunma	Gangneung, Gangwon
19:00 UTC+9		Report	Han Dong-Won 11'; Kim Jung-Woo 77'	Stadium: Gangneung Stadium; Attendance: 6,733; Referee: Ryu Hee-Sun

8 April Group Round	Seongnam Ilhwa Chunma	1 – 1	Incheon United	Seongnam, Gyeonggi
20:00 UTC+9	Mota 32'	Report	Yoo Byung-Soo 47'	Stadium: Seongnam Stadium; Attendance: 3,777; Referee: Woo Sang-Il

22 April Group Round	Daegu	0 – 0	Seongnam Ilhwa Chunma	Suseong-gu, Daegu
19:30 UTC+9		Report		Stadium: Daegu Stadium; Attendance: 1,504; Referee: Mae Ho-Young

5 May Group Round	Seongnam Ilhwa Chunma	4 – 1	Chunnam Dragons	Seongnam, Gyeonggi
15:00 UTC+9	Mota 14'; Ko Jae-Seong 22'; Cho Dong-Geon 32'; Han Dong-Won 79'	Report	Kim Myung-Woon 14'	Stadium: Seongnam Stadium; Attendance: 11,818; Referee: Lee Sam-Ho

27 May Group Round	Daejeon Citizen	0 – 2	Seongnam Ilhwa Chunma	Yuseong-gu, Daejeon
19:00 UTC+9		Report	Kim Jin-Yong 5'; Han Dong-Won 55'	Stadium: Daejeon World Cup Stadium; Attendance: 10,458; Referee: Lee Young-Cheol

8 July Quarterfinal 1st leg	Busan I'Park	3 – 2	Seongnam Ilhwa Chunma	Yeonje-gu, Busan
20:00 UTC+9	Yang Dong-Hyun 9'; Lee Gang-Jin 41'; Rômulo 87'	Report	Cho Dong-Geon 26'; Kim Jin-Yong 51'	Stadium: Busan Asiad Stadium; Attendance: 3,922; Referee: Choi Myung-Yong

22 July Quarterfinal 2nd leg	Seongnam Ilhwa Chunma	1 – 0 (4 – 5 p)	Busan I'Park	Seongnam, Gyeonggi
20:00 UTC+9	Kim Jung-Woo 55'	Report		Stadium: Seongnam Stadium; Attendance: 2,621; Referee: Yoo Byung-Sub
	Penalties
	Ognenovski (penalty scored); Fabrício (penalty missed); Jeon Kwang-Jin (penalty scored); Kim Sung-hwan (penalty scored); Jung Sung-Ryong (penalty scored)		(penalty missed) Jeong Shung-Hoon; (penalty scored) Kang Seung-Jo; (penalty scored) Han Sang-Woon; (penalty scored) Park Jin-Sub; (penalty scored) Kim Hyo-Il; (penalty scored) Hong Seong-Yo

=== Peace Cup ===
26 July Group Round	Sevilla (Spain)	0 – 0	(South Korea) Seongnam Ilhwa Chunma	Seville, Spain
20:30 UTC+2		Report		Stadium: Ramón Sánchez Pizjuán; Attendance: 2,000; Referee: Alon Yefet (Israel)

28 July Group Round	Juventus (Italy)	3 – 0	(South Korea) Seongnam Ilhwa Chunma	Jerez, Spain
20:30 UTC+2	Iaquinta 40'; Diego 52'; Legrottaglie 70'	Report		Stadium: Estadio Municipal de Chapín; Attendance: 1,000; Referee: Manuel Mejuto González (Spain)

== Squad statistics ==
Statistics accurate as of match played 6 December 2009

No.	Nat.	Pos.	Name	League		FA Cup		League Cup		Peace Cup		Appearances		Goals
No.	Nat.	Pos.	Name	Apps	Goals	Apps	Goals	Apps	Goals	Apps	Goals	App (sub)	Total	Goals
1	(South Korea)	GK	Jung Sung-Ryong	29	0	2	0	7	0	2	0	40 (0)	40	0
2	(South Korea)	DF	Ko Jae-Sung	15 (4)	0	2 (1)	0	6	1	0 (2)	0	23 (7)	30	1
3	(South Korea)	DF	Seo Seok-Won	0 (2)	0	0	0	0 (1)	0	0	0	0 (3)	3	0
4	(Australia)	DF	Saša Ognenovski	24	2	3 (1)	0	6 (1)	0	2	0	35 (2)	37	2
5	(South Korea)	DF	Cho Byung-Kuk	18 (1)	2	3	0	7	0	2	0	30 (1)	31	2
6	(South Korea)	DF	Jeon Kwang-Jin	19 (1)	0	4	0	2 (1)	0	0 (1)	0	25 (3)	28	0
8	(South Korea)	MF	Lee Ho	28	2	4 (1)	0	7	0	2	0	41 (1)	42	2
9	(South Korea)	FW	Hong Jin-Sub	3 (6)	0	0 (1)	0	0	0	0	0	3 (7)	10	0
10	(Montenegro)	FW	Dženan Radončić	16 (12)	6	4 (1)	1	4	0	2	0	26 (13)	39	7
11	(Colombia)	MF	Mauricio Molina	17	10	2	1	0	0	1 (1)	0	20 (1)	21	11
12	(South Korea)	MF	Choi Jae-Young	1 (1)	0	0	0	0	0	0	0	1 (1)	2	0
13	(South Korea)	MF	Shin Dong-Keun	0	0	0	0	0	0	0	0	0	0	0
14	(South Korea)	MF	Kim Jung-Woo	28	3	5	1	7	2	1	0	41 (0)	41	6
15	(South Korea)	FW	Han Dong-Won	12 (9)	3	1	1	3 (2)	3	2	0	18 (11)	29	7
16	(South Korea)	MF	Kim Sung-hwan	25 (4)	3	5	0	4	0	1	0	35 (4)	39	3
17	(South Korea)	MF	Kim Cheol-Ho	19 (9)	0	3 (2)	0	2 (2)	0	1 (1)	0	25 (14)	39	0
18	(South Korea)	FW	Cho Dong-Geon	26 (6)	6	4 (1)	1	6 (1)	2	1	0	37 (8)	45	9
19	(South Korea)	MF	Shin Young-Cheol	0	0	0	0	0	0	0	0	0	0	0
20	(South Korea)	FW	Kim Jin-Yong	22 (8)	5	3 (2)	1	4 (3)	2	2	0	31 (13)	44	8
21	(South Korea)	GK	Jung Eui-Do	0 (1)	0	0	0	0	0	0	0	0 (1)	1	0
22	(South Korea)	FW	Moon Dae-Seong	4 (7)	0	0	0	1 (2)	0	0	0	5 (9)	14	0
23	(Brazil)	MF	Fabrício	9 (5)	0	1 (1)	0	0 (1)	0	0 (2)	0	10 (9)	19	0
24	(South Korea)	DF	Kim Jin-hee	0	0	0	0	0	0	0	0	0	0	0
25	(South Korea)	DF	Lee Chi-Joon	0 (1)	0	0	0	0	0	0	0	0 (1)	1	0
27	(South Korea)	FW	Jin Min-Ho	0	0	0	0	0	0	0	0	0	0	0
28	(South Korea)	FW	Park Kyuk-Po	0	0	0	0	0	0	0	0	0	0	0
29	(South Korea)	MF	Park Sung-Soo	0	0	0	0	0	0	0	0	0	0	0
30	(South Korea)	MF	Kim Kyung-Sub	0	0	0	0	0	0	0	0	0	0	0
31	(South Korea)	GK	Jeon Sang-Wook	3	0	2	0	0	0	0 (1)	0	5 (1)	6	0
32	(South Korea)	MF	Lim Jae-Hoon	0 (1)	0	0	0	0 (1)	0	0	0	0 (2)	2	0
33	(South Korea)	DF	Jang Hak-Young	28 (1)	0	5	0	6 (1)	0	2	0	41 (2)	43	0
34	(South Korea)	DF	Ryu Hyung-Ryeol	0	0	0	0	0	0	0	0	0	0	0
35	(South Korea)	MF	Kim Sung-Kyun	0 (2)	0	0	0	0 (2)	0	1	0	1 (4)	5	0
36	(South Korea)	MF	Yoon Jae-Min	0	0	0	0	0	0	0	0	0	0	0
37	(South Korea)	DF	Lee Kyung-Min	0	0	0	0	0	0	0	0	0	0	0
38	(South Korea)	FW	Park Kwang-Min	0	0	0	0	0	0	0	0	0	0	0
39	(South Korea)	DF	Kim Tae-Yoon	1	0	0 (1)	0	0	0	0	0	1 (1)	2	0
40	(South Korea)	DF	Park Woo-Hyun	6 (5)	0	0 (2)	0	0	0	0	0	6 (7)	13	0
41	(South Korea)	GK	Lee Won-Hee	0	0	0	0	0	0	0	0	0	0	0
44	(South Korea)	GK	Kim Yong-Dae	1 (1)	0	1	0	0	0	0	0	2 (1)	3	0
11	(Brazil)	FW	Mota (out)	8	0	1	3	3	2	0	0	12 (0)	12	5
12	(South Korea)	MF	Lee Hyung-Sang (out)	0	0	0	0	0	0	0	0	0	0	0
13	(South Korea)	FW	Ou Kyoung-Jun (out)	1 (6)	0	0	0	2 (2)	0	0	0	3 (8)	11	0

== Transfer ==
=== In ===
- 22 October 2009 – (South Korea) Kim Yong-Dae – Gwangju Sangmu FC
- 22 October 2009 – (South Korea) Kim Tae-Yoon – Gwangju Sangmu FC
- 22 October 2009 – (South Korea) Shin Dong-Keun – Gwangju Sangmu FC
- 22 October 2009 – (South Korea) Park Kwang-Min – Gwangju Sangmu FC

=== Out ===
- December 2008 – (South Korea) Kim Hae-Woon – retired
- 12 January 2009 – (South Korea) Lee Dong-Gook – Jeonbuk Hyundai Motors
- 12 January 2009 – (South Korea) Kim Sang-Sik – Jeonbuk Hyundai Motors
- 12 January 2009 – (South Korea) Son Dae-Ho – Incheon United
- 19 January 2009 – (South Korea) Kim Young-chul – Chunnam Dragons
- January 2009 – (South Korea) Park Jae-Yong – Ulsan Hyundai FC
- January 2009 – (South Korea) Kim Dong-hyun – Gyeongnam FC
- January 2009 – (South Korea) Lee Won-Hee – Free Agent
- 2 March 2009 – (South Korea) Park Jin-Seop – Busan I'Park
- 22 June 2009 – (Brazil) Mota – Contract canceled
- 26 June 2009 – (South Korea) Lee Hyung-Sang – Banik Ostrava
- 12 July 2009 – (South Korea) Ou Kyoung-Jun – FC Metz (loan end)
