= 2010 FIFA Club World Cup squads =

The 2010 FIFA Club World Cup took place in Abu Dhabi, United Arab Emirates, from 8 December to 18 December 2010. The final 23-man squads had to be submitted by 29 November, with all members of the final squad taken from the provisional list. All players were required to be registered with squad numbers between 1 and 23, unless they were registered for their domestic league with a different number. In the event of an injury to one of the players on the final list, that player may be replaced with a player from the provisional list no less than 24 hours before his team's first match in the competition.

== Al Wahda ==
coach: (Austria) Josef Hickersberger

Note: Flags indicate national team as defined under FIFA eligibility rules; some limited exceptions apply. Players may hold more than one non-FIFA nationality.

| No. | Pos. | Nation | Player |
|---|---|---|---|
| 1 | GK | UAE | Mutaz Abdulla |
| 2 | DF | UAE | Yaqoob Al Hosani |
| 6 | MF | BRA | Magrão |
| 7 | FW | UAE | Mohamed Al Shehhi |
| 8 | DF | UAE | Omar Ali |
| 9 | FW | BRA | Fernando Baiano |
| 10 | FW | UAE | Ismail Matar |
| 11 | FW | UAE | Saeed Al Kuthairi |
| 12 | DF | UAE | Khalid Jalal |
| 13 | DF | UAE | Talal Al Jneibi |
| 15 | MF | UAE | Fahad Masood |
| 18 | GK | UAE | Ali Al Hosani |

| No. | Pos. | Nation | Player |
|---|---|---|---|
| 20 | FW | CIV | Modibo Diarra |
| 21 | DF | UAE | Bashir Saeed |
| 23 | MF | UAE | Haider Alo Ali (captain) |
| 24 | MF | UAE | Abdulrahim Jumaa |
| 26 | FW | UAE | Mahmoud Khamees |
| 27 | FW | UAE | Salem Saleh |
| 28 | DF | UAE | Eissa Ahmed |
| 36 | DF | UAE | Hamdan Al Kamali |
| 39 | MF | UAE | Amer Bazuhair |
| 40 | GK | UAE | Adel Al Hosani |
| 80 | MF | BRA | Hugo |

== Hekari United ==
Manager: (Solomon Islands) Jerry Allen

Note: Flags indicate national team as defined under FIFA eligibility rules; some limited exceptions apply. Players may hold more than one non-FIFA nationality.

| No. | Pos. | Nation | Player |
|---|---|---|---|
| 1 | GK | FIJ | Simione Tamanisau |
| 2 | DF | SOL | Gideon Omokirio |
| 4 | DF | PNG | Trevor Ire |
| 6 | MF | SOL | Abraham Iniga |
| 7 | MF | SOL | Benjamin Mela |
| 9 | FW | FIJ | Tuimasi Manuca |
| 10 | FW | FIJ | Osea Vakatalesau |
| 11 | FW | SOL | Joachim Waroi |
| 12 | MF | PNG | David Muta |
| 13 | MF | PNG | Andrew Lepani |
| 14 | FW | PNG | Niel Hans |
| 15 | MF | PNG | Samuel Kini |

| No. | Pos. | Nation | Player |
|---|---|---|---|
| 16 | MF | FIJ | Pita Baleitoga |
| 17 | FW | PNG | Kema Jack |
| 18 | MF | PNG | Ericson Komeng |
| 19 | DF | PNG | Koriak Upaiga |
| 20 | GK | PNG | Gure Gabina |
| 21 | MF | FIJ | Malakai Tiwa |
| 22 | GK | PNG | David Aua |
| 23 | FW | PNG | Ian Yanum |
| 25 | DF | FIJ | Alvin Singh |
| 27 | FW | SOL | Rex Honu |
| 28 | MF | SOL | Henry Fa'arodo |

== Internacional ==
Manager: (Brazil) Celso Roth

Note: Flags indicate national team as defined under FIFA eligibility rules; some limited exceptions apply. Players may hold more than one non-FIFA nationality.

| No. | Pos. | Nation | Player |
|---|---|---|---|
| 1 | GK | BRA | Renan |
| 2 | DF | BRA | Bolívar (captain) |
| 3 | DF | BRA | Índio |
| 4 | DF | BRA | Nei |
| 5 | MF | ARG | Pablo Guiñazú |
| 6 | DF | BRA | Kléber |
| 7 | MF | BRA | Tinga |
| 8 | MF | BRA | Giuliano |
| 9 | FW | BRA | Alecsandro |
| 10 | MF | ARG | Andrés D'Alessandro |
| 11 | FW | BRA | Rafael Sóbis |
| 12 | MF | BRA | Derley |

| No. | Pos. | Nation | Player |
|---|---|---|---|
| 13 | DF | BRA | Rodrigo |
| 14 | DF | BRA | Ronaldo Alves |
| 15 | MF | BRA | Glaydson |
| 16 | DF | BRA | Juan Jesus |
| 17 | MF | BRA | Andrezinho |
| 18 | MF | BRA | Oscar |
| 19 | FW | BRA | Leandro Damião |
| 20 | MF | BRA | Wilson Tiago |
| 21 | DF | BRA | Daniel |
| 22 | GK | ARG | Roberto Abbondanzieri |
| 23 | GK | BRA | Lauro |

== Internazionale ==
Manager: (Spain) Rafael Benítez

Note: Flags indicate national team as defined under FIFA eligibility rules; some limited exceptions apply. Players may hold more than one non-FIFA nationality.

| No. | Pos. | Nation | Player |
|---|---|---|---|
| 1 | GK | BRA | Júlio César |
| 2 | DF | COL | Iván Córdoba |
| 4 | DF | ARG | Javier Zanetti (captain) |
| 5 | MF | SRB | Dejan Stanković |
| 6 | DF | BRA | Lúcio |
| 8 | MF | BRA | Thiago Motta |
| 9 | FW | CMR | Samuel Eto'o |
| 10 | MF | NED | Wesley Sneijder |
| 11 | MF | GHA | Sulley Muntari |
| 12 | GK | ITA | Luca Castellazzi |
| 13 | DF | BRA | Maicon |
| 17 | MF | KEN | McDonald Mariga |

| No. | Pos. | Nation | Player |
|---|---|---|---|
| 19 | MF | ARG | Esteban Cambiasso |
| 21 | GK | ITA | Paolo Orlandoni |
| 22 | FW | ARG | Diego Milito |
| 23 | DF | ITA | Marco Materazzi |
| 26 | DF | ROU | Cristian Chivu |
| 27 | FW | MKD | Goran Pandev |
| 31 | FW | ROU | Denis Alibec |
| 36 | DF | ITA | Simone Benedetti |
| 39 | DF | ITA | Davide Santon |
| 40 | MF | NGA | Nwankwo Obiora |
| 88 | FW | FRA | Jonathan Biabiany |

== Pachuca ==
Manager: (Argentina) Pablo Marini

Note: Flags indicate national team as defined under FIFA eligibility rules; some limited exceptions apply. Players may hold more than one non-FIFA nationality.

| No. | Pos. | Nation | Player |
|---|---|---|---|
| 1 | GK | COL | Miguel Calero (captain) |
| 2 | DF | MEX | Leobardo López |
| 4 | DF | MEX | Marco Iván Pérez |
| 6 | MF | USA | Marco Vidal |
| 7 | MF | MEX | Edy Brambila |
| 9 | FW | USA | Herculez Gomez |
| 10 | FW | PAR | Édgar Benítez |
| 11 | MF | MEX | Braulio Luna |
| 12 | MF | MEX | Juan Carlos Rojas |
| 13 | FW | MEX | Víctor Mañon |
| 14 | FW | MEX | Daniel Arreola |
| 15 | MF | MEX | Luis Montes |

| No. | Pos. | Nation | Player |
|---|---|---|---|
| 16 | MF | MEX | Carlos Gerardo Rodríguez |
| 18 | MF | USA | José Francisco Torres |
| 19 | FW | ARG | Darío Cvitanich |
| 21 | MF | ARG | Damián Manso |
| 22 | DF | MEX | Paul Aguilar |
| 23 | GK | MEX | Carlos Velázquez |
| 24 | MF | MEX | Raúl Martínez |
| 25 | FW | COL | Franco Arizala |
| 26 | DF | ARG | Javier Muñoz Mustafá |
| 27 | MF | MEX | Carlos Alberto Peña |
| 30 | GK | MEX | Rodolfo Cota |

== Seongnam Ilhwa Chunma ==
Manager: (South Korea) Shin Tae-Yong

Note: Flags indicate national team as defined under FIFA eligibility rules; some limited exceptions apply. Players may hold more than one non-FIFA nationality.

| No. | Pos. | Nation | Player |
|---|---|---|---|
| 1 | GK | KOR | Jung Sung-Ryong |
| 2 | DF | KOR | Ko Jae-Sung |
| 3 | DF | KOR | Yoon Young-Sun |
| 4 | DF | AUS | Saša Ognenovski |
| 5 | DF | KOR | Cho Byung-Kuk |
| 6 | DF | KOR | Jeon Kwang-Jin |
| 8 | FW | KOR | Choi Sung-Kuk |
| 9 | FW | KOR | Cho Dong-Geon |
| 10 | FW | MNE | Dženan Radončić |
| 11 | MF | COL | Mauricio Molina |
| 13 | DF | KOR | Jeong Ho-Jeong |

| No. | Pos. | Nation | Player |
|---|---|---|---|
| 14 | FW | KOR | Song Ho-Young |
| 16 | MF | KOR | Kim Sung-hwan |
| 18 | FW | KOR | Namkung Do |
| 20 | FW | KOR | Kim Jin-Yong |
| 22 | DF | KOR | Hong Cheol |
| 26 | DF | KOR | Jang Suk-Won |
| 30 | MF | KOR | Jo Jae-Cheol |
| 31 | GK | KOR | Lee Sang-Ki |
| 32 | MF | KOR | Park Sang-Hee |
| 38 | DF | KOR | Yong Hyun-Jin |
| 41 | GK | KOR | Kang Sung-Kwan |

== TP Mazembe ==
Manager: (Senegal) Lamine N'Diaye

Note: Flags indicate national team as defined under FIFA eligibility rules; some limited exceptions apply. Players may hold more than one non-FIFA nationality.

| No. | Pos. | Nation | Player |
|---|---|---|---|
| 1 | GK | COD | Robert Kidiaba |
| 2 | DF | COD | Joël Kimwaki |
| 3 | DF | COD | Jean Kasusula |
| 4 | DF | COD | Eric Nkulukuta |
| 5 | DF | COD | Tshani Mukinayi |
| 6 | MF | COD | Déo Kanda |
| 7 | MF | COD | Patient Mwepu |
| 8 | MF | COD | Hervé Ndonga |
| 10 | MF | ZAM | Given Singuluma |
| 11 | MF | COD | Patou Kabangu |
| 12 | DF | COD | Bawaka Mabele |

| No. | Pos. | Nation | Player |
|---|---|---|---|
| 13 | MF | COD | Bedi Mbenza |
| 15 | FW | COD | Dioko Kaluyituka |
| 16 | DF | ZAM | Stopila Sunzu |
| 18 | FW | COD | Luyeye Mvete |
| 20 | MF | COD | Mihayo Kazembe |
| 21 | GK | COD | Aimé Bakula |
| 22 | GK | CMR | Laurent Ngome |
| 24 | MF | CMR | Narcisse Ekanga |
| 27 | FW | COD | Kasongo Ngandu |
| 28 | DF | COD | Tshizeu Kanymbo |
| 30 | MF | COD | Kayembe Lufulwabo |
