= Seongnam FC in international competitions =

Seongnam FC is a South Korean professional football club based in Seongnam, South Korea, who currently play in the K-League. Seongnam FC participated under the name of Ilhwa chunma from 1993–94 Asian Club Championship and won the title in their second season in the Asia. Their first Asian game was against Kedah FA of Malaysia.

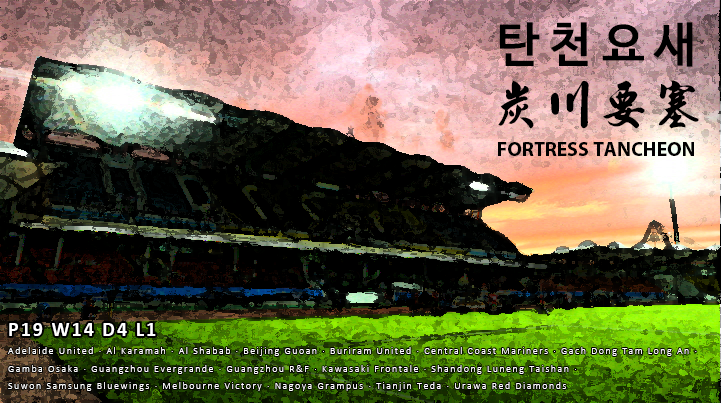
Tancheon Fortress - named since Seongnam FC's strong record against Asian outfits in their home ground, Tancheon Stadium.

Since Asian Club Championship renamed as AFC Champions League, Seongnam Ilhwa Chunma was close to win the title again in 2004 AFC Champions League, but massive 0–5 loss to Ittihad FC in 2nd leg of the final costs them the title and made the legendary coach, Cha Kyung-bok to resign.

After the shocking defeat in 2004, Seongnam Ilhwa Chunma moved their home games to Tancheon Stadium and has been built a strong home record. By the end of their latest participation in the 2015 AFC Champions League, they recorded 14 wins, 4 draws and 1 loss out of 19 games.

== Honours ==
- AFC Champions League

Winners (2): 1995, 2010
Runners-up (2): 1996–97, 2004

- Asian Super Cup

Winners (1): 1996

- A3 Champions Cup

Winners (1): 2004

- FIFA Club World Cup

Fourth place (1): 2010 as the Asian representatives

- Afro-Asian Club Championship

Winners (1): 1996 as the Asian representatives

== Matches ==
Season	Competition	Date	Round	Opponent	Result	Scorer(s)
1994–95	Asian Club Championship (played as Ilhwa Chunma)	1994-09-04	First round	(Malaysia) Kedah FA	5–3 (H)	Ko Jeong-Woon(2), Shin Tae-Yong(2), Han Jung-Guk
1994–95	Asian Club Championship (played as Ilhwa Chunma)	1994-09-17	First round	(Malaysia) Kedah FA	5–1 (A)	Shin Tae-Yong, Lee Sang-Yoon, Kim Yi-Ju, Oh Dong-Cheon, Maksimović
1994–95	Asian Club Championship (played as Ilhwa Chunma)	1994-10-01	Second round	(Indonesia) Pelita Jaya	1–0 (A)	Oh Dong-Cheon
1994–95	Asian Club Championship (played as Ilhwa Chunma)	1994-10-18	Second round	(Indonesia) Pelita Jaya	4–1 (H)	Kim Yi-Ju, Oh Dong-Cheon, Lee Sang-Yoon(2)
1994–95	Asian Club Championship (played as Ilhwa Chunma)	1994-11-20	Quarterfinals	(Japan) Verdy Kawasaki	3–1	Lee Ki-Beom, Shin Tae-Yong
1994–95	Asian Club Championship (played as Ilhwa Chunma)	1994-11-22	Quarterfinals	(China) Liaoning FC	3–1	Lee Sang-Yoon(2), Ha Seong-Jun
1994–95	Asian Club Championship (played as Ilhwa Chunma)	1994-11-24	Quarterfinals	(Thailand) Thai Farmers Bank	1–0	Park Nam-Yeol
1994–95	Asian Club Championship (played as Ilhwa Chunma)	1995-01-27	Semifinal	(Qatar) Al-Arabi SC	0–2	
1994–95	Asian Club Championship (played as Ilhwa Chunma)	1995-01-29	3rd place match	(Uzbekistan) Neftchy Farg'ona	0–1	
1995–96	Asian Club Championship (played as Ilhwa Chunma)	1995-09-16	First round	(Macau) GD Lam Pak	5–0 (H)	Hwang Yeon-Seok(2), Shin Tae-Yong, Park Nam-Yeol, Jo Woo-Seok
1995–96	Asian Club Championship (played as Ilhwa Chunma)	—	First round	(Macau) GD Lam Pak	3–0 (A)	Lam Pak withdrew after the 1st leg
1995–96	Asian Club Championship (played as Ilhwa Chunma)	1995-10-14	Second round	(Malaysia) Pahang FA	3–2 (A)	Shin Tae-Yong, Lee Sang-Yoon, Ko Jeong-Woon
1995–96	Asian Club Championship (played as Ilhwa Chunma)	1995-10-28	Second round	(Malaysia) Pahang FA	2–0 (H)	Ko Jeong-Woon(2)
1995–96	Asian Club Championship (played as Ilhwa Chunma)	1995-11-26	Quarterfinals	(Thailand) Thai Farmers Bank	1–1	Shin Tae-Yong
1995–96	Asian Club Championship (played as Ilhwa Chunma)	1995-11-28	Quarterfinals	(Indonesia) Persib Bandung	5–2	Han Jung-Guk, Shin Tae-Yong, Ranković(2), Hwang Yeon-Seok
1995–96	Asian Club Championship (played as Ilhwa Chunma)	1995-11-30	Quarterfinals	(Japan) Verdy Kawasaki	1–0	Park Nam-Yeol
1995–96	Asian Club Championship (played as Ilhwa Chunma)	1995-12-27	Semifinal	(Iran) Saipa	1–0	Lee Kwang-Hyun
1995–96	Asian Club Championship (played as Ilhwa Chunma)	1995-12-29	Final	(Saudi Arabia) Al-Nassr	1–0	Lee Tae-Hong
1996	Afro-Asian Club Championship (played as Cheonan Ilhwa Chunma)	1996-05-04	Final 1st leg	(South Africa) Orlando Pirates	0–0 (A)	
1996	Afro-Asian Club Championship (played as Cheonan Ilhwa Chunma)	1996-05-18	Final 2nd leg	(South Africa) Orlando Pirates	5–0 (H)	Lee Ki-Beom(2), Ko Jeong-Woon(2), Lee Tae-Hong
1996	Asian Super Cup (played as Cheonan Ilhwa Chunma)	1996-07-31	Final 1st leg	(Japan) Bellmare Hiratsuka	5–3 (H)	Lee Ki-Beom(2), Han Jung-Guk(2), Lee Sang-Yoon
1996	Asian Super Cup (played as Cheonan Ilhwa Chunma)	1996-08-07	Final 2nd leg	(Japan) Bellmare Hiratsuka	1–0 (A)	Shin Tae-Yong
1996–97	Asian Club Championship (played as Cheonan Ilhwa Chunma)	1996-09-07	Second round	(China) Shanghai Shenhua	0–0 (H)	
1996–97	Asian Club Championship (played as Cheonan Ilhwa Chunma)	1996-09-14	Second round	(China) Shanghai Shenhua	1–0 (A)	Lee Sang-Yoon
1996–97	Asian Club Championship (played as Cheonan Ilhwa Chunma)	1996-11-24	Quarterfinals	(Maldives) New Radiant	9–0	Lee Sang-Yoon, Kim Dong-Gun(2), Hwang Yeon-Seok, Lee Ki-Beom, Han Jung-Guk, Stepouchkine, Agbo
1996–97	Asian Club Championship (played as Cheonan Ilhwa Chunma)	1996-11-26	Quarterfinals	(Japan) Yokohama Marinos	3–2	Lee Sang-Yoon(2), Hwang Yeon-Seok
1996–97	Asian Club Championship (played as Cheonan Ilhwa Chunma)	1996-11-28	Quarterfinals	(South Korea) Pohang Steelers	0–0	
1996–97	Asian Club Championship (played as Cheonan Ilhwa Chunma)	1997-03-07	Semifinal	(Iraq) Al-Zawra'a	1–0	Kim Chang-Won
1996–97	Asian Club Championship (played as Cheonan Ilhwa Chunma)	1997-03-09	Semifinal	(South Korea) Pohang Steelers	1–2	Hong Jong-Kyung
2000–01	Asian Cup Winners' Cup (played as Seongnam Ilhwa Chunma)	2000	Second Round	(China) Dalian Shide	0–2 (A)	
2000–01	Asian Cup Winners' Cup (played as Seongnam Ilhwa Chunma)	2000	Second Round	(China) Dalian Shide	1–0 (H)	Unknown
2003	A3 Champions Cup (played as Seongnam Ilhwa Chunma)	2003-02-16	Group stage	(Japan) Jubilo Iwata	2–0	Shin Tae-Yong, Kim Dae-Eui
2003	A3 Champions Cup (played as Seongnam Ilhwa Chunma)	2003-02-19	Group stage	(China) Dalian Shide	2–3	Drakulic, Shin Tae-Yong
2003	A3 Champions Cup (played as Seongnam Ilhwa Chunma)	2003-02-22	Group stage	(Japan) Kashima Antlers	0–0	
2003	AFC Champions League (played as Seongnam Ilhwa Chunma)	2003-03-09	Group stage	(Thailand) Osotsapa FC	6–0	Park Nam-Yeol, Kim Dae-Eui, Kim Do-Hoon(3), Drakulic
2003	AFC Champions League (played as Seongnam Ilhwa Chunma)	2003-03-12	Group stage	(Japan) Shimizu S-Pulse	2–1	Drakulic, Kim Dae-Eui
2003	AFC Champions League (played as Seongnam Ilhwa Chunma)	2003-03-15	Group stage	(China) Dalian Shide	1–3	Kim Dae-Eui
2004	AFC Champions League (played as Seongnam Ilhwa Chunma)	2004-02-11	Group stage	(Indonesia) Persik Kediri	2–1 (A)	Kim Do-Hoon(2)
2004	AFC Champions League (played as Seongnam Ilhwa Chunma)	2004-02-25	Group stage	(Vietnam) Bình Định	2–0 (H)	Do Jae-Joon, Chun Dae-Hwan
2004	AFC Champions League (played as Seongnam Ilhwa Chunma)	2004-04-07	Group stage	(Japan) Yokohama F. Marinos	2–1 (A)	Laktionov, Adhemar
2004	AFC Champions League (played as Seongnam Ilhwa Chunma)	2004-04-21	Group stage	(Japan) Yokohama F. Marinos	0–1 (H)	
2004	AFC Champions League (played as Seongnam Ilhwa Chunma)	2004-05-11	Group stage	(Indonesia) Persik Kediri	15–0 (H)	Sabitović(4), Adhemar(2), Shin Tae-Yong, Laktionov(4), Kim Do-Hoon(3), Cho Sung-Rae
2004	AFC Champions League (played as Seongnam Ilhwa Chunma)	2004-05-19	Group stage	(Vietnam) Bình Định	3–1 (A)	Adhemar(2), Shin Tae-Yong
2004	AFC Champions League (played as Seongnam Ilhwa Chunma)	2004-09-14	Quarterfinal	(United Arab Emirates) Al-Sharjah	6–0 (H)	Kim Do-Hoon, Lee Ki-Hyung, Dudu(2), Do Jae-Joon, Laktionov
2004	AFC Champions League (played as Seongnam Ilhwa Chunma)	2004-09-22	Quarterfinal	(United Arab Emirates) Al-Sharjah	5–2 (A)	Dudu(2), Marcelo, Kim Do-Hoon, Laktionov
2004	AFC Champions League (played as Seongnam Ilhwa Chunma)	2004-10-20	Semifinal	(Uzbekistan) Pakhtakor Tashkent	0–0 (H)	
2004	AFC Champions League (played as Seongnam Ilhwa Chunma)	2004-10-27	Semifinal	(Uzbekistan) Pakhtakor Tashkent	2–0 (A)	Kim Do-Hoon, Dudu
2004	AFC Champions League (played as Seongnam Ilhwa Chunma)	2004-11-24	Final	(Saudi Arabia) Al-Ittihad	3–1 (A)	Laktionov, Kim Do-Hoon, Jang Hak-Young
2004	AFC Champions League (played as Seongnam Ilhwa Chunma)	2004-12-01	Final	(Saudi Arabia) Al-Ittihad	0–5 (H)	
2004	A3 Champions Cup (played as Seongnam Ilhwa Chunma)	2004-02-22	Group stage	(Japan) Yokohama F. Marinos	3–0	Kim Do-Hoon, Adhemar, Shin Tae-Yong
2004	A3 Champions Cup (played as Seongnam Ilhwa Chunma)	2004-02-25	Group stage	(China) Shanghai International	1–0	Kim Do-Hoon
2004	A3 Champions Cup (played as Seongnam Ilhwa Chunma)	2004-02-28	Group stage	(China) Shanghai Shenhua	1–1	Harry Castillo
2007	AFC Champions League (played as Seongnam Ilhwa Chunma)	2007-03-07	Group stage	(Vietnam) Dong Tam Long An	4–1 (H)	Mota(2), Kim Dong-hyun, Neaga
2007	AFC Champions League (played as Seongnam Ilhwa Chunma)	2007-03-21	Group stage	(China) Shandong Luneng	1–2 (A)	Cho Byung-Kuk
2007	AFC Champions League (played as Seongnam Ilhwa Chunma)	2007-04-11	Group stage	(Australia) Adelaide United	2–2 (A)	Kim Dong-hyun, Mota
2007	AFC Champions League (played as Seongnam Ilhwa Chunma)	2007-04-25	Group stage	(Australia) Adelaide United	1–0 (H)	Choi Sung-Kuk
2007	AFC Champions League (played as Seongnam Ilhwa Chunma)	2007-05-09	Group stage	(Vietnam) Dong Tam Long An	2–1 (A)	Mota, Choi Sung-Kuk
2007	AFC Champions League (played as Seongnam Ilhwa Chunma)	2007-05-23	Group stage	(China) Shandong Luneng	3–0 (H)	Kim Dong-hyun, Son Dae-Ho, Mota
2007	AFC Champions League (played as Seongnam Ilhwa Chunma)	2007-09-19	Quarterfinal	(Syria) Al-Karamah	2–1 (H)	Kim Min-ho, Cho Byung-Kuk
2007	AFC Champions League (played as Seongnam Ilhwa Chunma)	2007-09-26	Quarterfinal	(Syria) Al-Karamah	2–0 (A)	Mota, Kim Dong-hyun
2007	AFC Champions League (played as Seongnam Ilhwa Chunma)	2007-10-03	Semifinal	(Japan) Urawa Red Diamonds	2–2 (H)	Mota, Kim Do-Heon
2007	AFC Champions League (played as Seongnam Ilhwa Chunma)	2007-10-24	Semifinal	(Japan) Urawa Red Diamonds	2–2 (3–5p) (A)	Choi Sung-Kuk, Kim Dong-hyun
2007	A3 Champions Cup (played as Seongnam Ilhwa Chunma)	2007-06-07	Group stage	(China) Shanghai Shenhua	0–3	
2007	A3 Champions Cup (played as Seongnam Ilhwa Chunma)	2007-06-10	Group stage	(Japan) Urawa Red Diamonds	0–1	
2007	A3 Champions Cup (played as Seongnam Ilhwa Chunma)	2007-06-13	Group stage	(China) Shandong Luneng	2–1	Kim Sang-Sik, Choi Sung-Kuk
2010	AFC Champions League (played as Seongnam Ilhwa Chunma)	2010-02-23	Group stage	(Japan) Kawasaki Frontale	2–0 (H)	Molina, Radončić
2010	AFC Champions League (played as Seongnam Ilhwa Chunma)	2010-03-09	Group stage	(Australia) Melbourne Victory	2–0 (A)	Ognenovski, Yun Young-Sun
2010	AFC Champions League (played as Seongnam Ilhwa Chunma)	2010-03-23	Group stage	(China) Beijing Guoan	3–1 (H)	Song Ho-Young, Radončić, Jo Jae-Cheol
2010	AFC Champions League (played as Seongnam Ilhwa Chunma)	2010-03-31	Group stage	(China) Beijing Guoan	1–0 (A)	Molina
2010	AFC Champions League (played as Seongnam Ilhwa Chunma)	2010-04-14	Group stage	(Japan) Kawasaki Frontale	0–3 (A)	
2010	AFC Champions League (played as Seongnam Ilhwa Chunma)	2010-04-28	Group stage	(Australia) Melbourne Victory	3–2 (H)	Jeon Kwang-Jin, Namgung Do, Jo Jae-Cheol
2010	AFC Champions League (played as Seongnam Ilhwa Chunma)	2010-05-11	Round of 16	(Japan) Gamba Osaka	3–0 (H)	Molina(2), Song Ho-Young
2010	AFC Champions League (played as Seongnam Ilhwa Chunma)	2010-09-15	Quarterfinal	(South Korea) Suwon Samsung Bluewings	4–1 (H)	Radončić(2), Molina, Own goal
2010	AFC Champions League (played as Seongnam Ilhwa Chunma)	2010-09-22	Quarterfinal	(South Korea) Suwon Samsung Bluewings	0–2 (A)	
2010	AFC Champions League (played as Seongnam Ilhwa Chunma)	2010-10-05	Semifinal	(Saudi Arabia) Al-Shabab	3–4 (A)	Molina(2), Jo Jae-Cheol
2010	AFC Champions League (played as Seongnam Ilhwa Chunma)	2010-10-20	Semifinal	(Saudi Arabia) Al-Shabab	1–0 (H)	Cho Dong-Geon
2010	AFC Champions League (played as Seongnam Ilhwa Chunma)	2010-11-13	Final	(Iran) Zob Ahan	3–1	Ognenovski, Cho Byung-Kuk, Kim Cheol-Ho
2010	FIFA Club World Cup (played as Seongnam Ilhwa Chunma)	2010-12-11	Quarterfinal	(United Arab Emirates) Al-Wahda	4–1	Molina, Ognenovski, Choi Sung-Kuk, Cho Dong-Geon
2010	FIFA Club World Cup (played as Seongnam Ilhwa Chunma)	2010-12-15	Semifinal	(Italy) Internazionale	0–3	
2010	FIFA Club World Cup (played as Seongnam Ilhwa Chunma)	2010-12-18	3rd place match	(Brazil) Internacional	2–4	Molina(2)
2012	Asian Challenge Cup (played as Seongnam Ilhwa Chunma)	2012-01-23	Semifinal	(China) Guangzhou R&F	5–1	Héverton, Han Sang-Woon(2), Jovančić, Yun Young-Sun
2012	Asian Challenge Cup (played as Seongnam Ilhwa Chunma)	2012-01-26	Final	(Japan) Shimizu S-Pulse	5–1	Éverton Santos(2), Héverton, Han Sang-Woon, Lee Chang-Hoon
2012	AFC Champions League (played as Seongnam Ilhwa Chunma)	2012-03-07	Group stage	(Japan) Nagoya Grampus	2–2 (A)	Héverton(2)
2012	AFC Champions League (played as Seongnam Ilhwa Chunma)	2012-03-21	Group stage	(China) Tianjin Teda	1–1 (H)	Han Sang-Woon
2012	AFC Champions League (played as Seongnam Ilhwa Chunma)	2012-04-03	Group stage	(Australia) Central Coast Mariners	1–1 (A)	Éverton
2012	AFC Champions League (played as Seongnam Ilhwa Chunma)	2012-04-18	Group stage	(Australia) Central Coast Mariners	5–0 (H)	Lee Chang-Hoon, Éverton(2), Kim Sung-hwan, Jovančić
2012	AFC Champions League (played as Seongnam Ilhwa Chunma)	2012-05-01	Group stage	(Japan) Nagoya Grampus	1–1 (H)	Han Sang-Woon
2012	AFC Champions League (played as Seongnam Ilhwa Chunma)	2012-05-15	Group stage	(China) Tianjin Teda	3–0 (A)	Yoon Bit-Garam, Jovančić(2)
2012	AFC Champions League (played as Seongnam Ilhwa Chunma)	2012-05-29	Round of 16	(Uzbekistan) Bunyodkor	0–1 (H)	

Win Draw Loss Upcoming fixture

24 February 2015 2015 AFC Champions League; Group F – Matchday 1	(Thailand) Buriram United	2–1	Seongnam FC	Buriram, Thailand
18:00 ICT	Prakit Deeprom 16' Gilberto Macena 18' Andrés Túñez (yellow card) 43'	Report	Jang Suk-won (yellow card) 39' Narubadin Weerawatnodom 87' (o.g.)	Stadium: Buriram Stadium; Attendance: 8,959; Referee: (United Arab Emirates) MOHAMMED ABDULLA HASSAN; Assistant referees: (United Arab Emirates) MOHAMED ALHAMMADI, (United Arab Emirates) HASAN ALMAHRI; Fourth official: (Pakistan) KHURRAM SHAHZAD; MVP: Diogo Luís Santo

3 March 2015 2015 AFC Champions League; Group F – Matchday 2	Seongnam FC	2–0	(Japan) Gamba Osaka	Seongnam, Korea Republic
19:30 KST	Ricardo Bueno 8' (pen.) Yun Young-sun (yellow card) 33' Hwang Ui-jo 67'	Report	Oh Jae-suk (yellow card) 84'	Stadium: Tancheon Stadium; Attendance: 7,813; Referee: (Uzbekistan) RAVSHAN IRMATOV; Assistant referees: (Uzbekistan) ABDUKHAMIDULLO RASULOV, (Uzbekistan) JAKHONGIR SAIDOV; Fourth official: (Uzbekistan) KASIMOV SHERZOD; MVP: Hwang Ui-jo

17 March 2015 2015 AFC Champions League; Group F – Matchday 3	(China) Guangzhou R&F	0-1	Seongnam FC	Guangzhou, China
19:30 CST	Abderrazak Hamdallah (yellow card) 23' Chang Feiya (yellow card) 58'; Tang Miao (yellow card) 71' Jang Hyun-soo (yellow card) 87', (yellow card) 87' (red card)	Report	Hwang Ui-jo 27' Lim Chai-min (yellow card) 32' Kim Cheol-ho (yellow card) 60'	Stadium: Yuexiushan Stadium; Attendance: 8,638; Referee: (Qatar) FAHAD JABER AL-MARRI; Assistant referees: (Qatar) JUMA MOHAMMED K H AL-BURSHAID, (Malaysia) SIVANESAN A/L MUNIANDY; Fourth official: (Thailand) SIVAKORN PU-UDOM; MVP: Hwang Ui-jo

7 April 2015 2015 AFC Champions League; Group F – Matchday 4	Seongnam FC	0-0	(China) Guangzhou R&F	Seongnam, Korea Republic
19:30 KST	Kim Dong-hee (yellow card) 13'	Report	Lu Lin (yellow card) 27' Ye Chugui (yellow card) 65' Jiang Zhipeng (yellow card) 90+2'	Stadium: Tancheon Stadium; Attendance: 5,777; Referee: (Bahrain) NAWAF SHUKRALLA; Assistant referees: (Bahrain) EBRAHIM SALEH, (Bahrain) NAWAF SHAHEEN MOOSA; Fourth official: (Bahrain) ABDULAZIZ YUSUF ABDULAZIZ AHMED ABDULLA; MVP: Liu Dianzuo

22 April 2015 2015 AFC Champions League; Group F – Matchday 5	Seongnam FC	2–1	(Thailand) Buriram United	Seongnam, Korea Republic
19:30 KST	Kim Do-heon 27' Nam Joon-jae 38'; Yun Young-sun (yellow card) 70'; Lucas Douglas Pajeu De Sousa (yellow card) 76'; Jung Seon-ho (yellow card) 86' Kwak Hae-sung (yellow card) 89'	Report	Narubadin Weerawatnodom (yellow card) 26' Chitipat Tanklang (yellow card) 44' Diogo Luís Santo 77'	Stadium: Tancheon Stadium; Attendance: 3,762; Referee: (Saudi Arabia) FAHAD ALMIRDASI; Assistant referees: (Saudi Arabia) ABDULAH ALSHALWAI, (Saudi Arabia) MOHAMMED MAKI A ALABAKRY; Fourth official: (Saudi Arabia) SALEH ABDULLAH M ALHETHLOL; MVP: Hwang Ui-jo

6 May 2015 2015 AFC Champions League; Group F – Matchday 6	(Japan) Gamba Osaka	2–1	Seongnam FC	Osaka, Japan
19:15 JST	Takashi Usami 64' Lins Lima de Brito 82' Takashi Usami (yellow card) 87'	Report	Hwang Ui-jo 15'	Stadium: Osaka Expo '70 Stadium; Attendance: 12,821; Referee: (United Arab Emirates) MOHAMMED ABDULLA HASSAN; Assistant referees: (United Arab Emirates) MOHAMED ALHAMMADI, (United Arab Emirates) HASAN ALMAHRI; Fourth official: (United Arab Emirates) ABDULLA ALI ABDULLA ALAAJEL ALZAABI; MVP: Takashi Usami

20 May 2015 2015 AFC Champions League; Round of 16 - 1st leg	Seongnam FC	2–1	(China) Guangzhou Evergrande	Seongnam, Korea Republic
19:30 KST	Jorginho 23' Jorginho (yellow card) 45+1'; Hwang Ui-jo (yellow card) 45+1' Kim Do-heon 90+5' (pen.)	Report	Huang Bowen 42'; Li Xuepeng 65	Stadium: Tancheon Stadium; Attendance: 13,792; Referee: (Iran) Torki Mohsen; Assistant referees: (Iran) Mohammad Reza Mansouri, (Iran) Alinezhadian Saeid; Fourth official: (Iran) Hasan Akrami; MVP: Kim Do-heon

27 May 2015 2015 AFC Champions League; Round of 16 - 2nd leg	(China) Guangzhou Evergrande	2–0 (3-2 agg.)	Seongnam FC	Guangzhou, China
20:00 CST	Zheng Long (yellow card) 19' Ricardo Goulart 27' (pen.); Mei Fang (yellow card) 33'; Ricardo Goulart 57'; Huang Bowen (yellow card) 64' Ricardo Goulart (yellow card) 84'	Report	Ricardo Bueno (yellow card) 1' Kwak Hae-seong (yellow card) 25'; Lim Chai-min (yellow card) 45' Park Tae-min (yellow card) 87'	Stadium: Tianhe Stadium; Attendance: 48,761; Referee: (Uzbekistan) Ravshan Irmatov; Assistant referees: (Uzbekistan) Abdukhamidullo Rasulov, (Uzbekistan) Jakhongir Saidov; Fourth official: (Uzbekistan) Kasimov Sherzod; MVP: Ricardo Goulart

== Record ==
=== By season ===
Season	Competition	P	W	D	L	F	A	Round
1994–95	Asian Club Championship	9	6	1	2	22	10	4th
1995–96	Asian Club Championship	9	8	1	0	22	5	W
1996	Afro-Asian Club Championship	2	1	1	0	5	0	W
1996	Asian Super Cup	2	2	0	0	6	3	W
1996–97	Asian Club Championship	7	4	2	1	15	4	RU
2000–01	Asian Cup Winners' Cup	2	1	0	1	1	2	R2
2002–03	AFC Champions League	3	2	0	1	9	4	GS
2003	A3 Champions Cup	3	1	1	1	4	3	3rd
2004	A3 Champions Cup	3	2	1	0	5	1	W
2004	AFC Champions League	12	9	1	2	40	12	RU
2007	AFC Champions League	10	6	3	1	21	11	SF
2007	A3 Champions Cup	3	1	0	2	2	5	4th
2010	AFC Champions League	12	9	0	3	25	14	W
2010	FIFA Club World Cup	3	1	0	2	6	8	4th
2012	Asian Challenge Cup	2	2	0	0	10	2	W
2012	AFC Champions League	7	2	4	1	13	6	R16
2015	AFC Champions League	8	4	1	3	9	8	R16
Total		97	61	16	20	215	98	

=== By Competition ===
Competition	Played	Won	Drawn	Lost	GF	GA
FIFA Club World Cup	3	1	0	2	6	8
Asian Club Championship / AFC Champions League	77	50	13	14	176	74
Afro-Asian Club Championship	2	1	1	0	5	0
Asian Super Cup	2	2	0	0	6	3
Asian Cup Winners' Cup	2	1	0	1	1	2
A3 Champions Cup	9	4	2	3	11	9
Asian Challenge Cup	2	2	0	0	10	2
Total	97	61	16	20	215	98

=== By Country ===
Country	Pld	W	D	L	GF	GA	GD	Win%
Australia	6	3	3	0	14	5	+9	50.00
Brazil	1	0	0	1	2	4	−2	0.00
China PR	22	12	4	6	32	22	+10	54.55
Indonesia	5	5	0	0	27	4	+23	100.00
Iran	2	2	0	0	4	1	+3	100.00
Iraq	1	1	0	0	1	0	+1	100.00
Italy	1	0	0	1	0	3	−3	0.00
Japan	22	13	5	4	42	23	+19	59.09
Korea Republic	4	1	1	2	5	5	+0	25.00
Macau	2	2	0	0	8	0	+8	100.00
Malaysia	4	4	0	0	15	6	+9	100.00
Maldives	1	1	0	0	9	0	+9	100.00
Qatar	1	0	0	1	0	2	−2	0.00
Saudi Arabia	5	3	0	2	8	10	−2	60.00
South Africa	2	1	1	0	5	0	+5	50.00
Syria	2	2	0	0	4	1	+3	100.00
Thailand	5	3	1	1	11	4	+7	60.00
United Arab Emirates	3	3	0	0	15	3	+12	100.00
Uzbekistan	4	1	1	2	2	2	+0	25.00
Vietnam	4	4	0	0	11	3	+8	100.00
Total	97	61	16	20	215	98	117	62.89
