= 2009 Korean FA Cup final =

- Event: 2009 Korean FA Cup
Seongnam Ilhwa Chunma	Suwon Samsung Bluewings
1	1
- Suwon Samsung Bluewings won 4–2 on penalties
- Date: 8 November 2009
- Venue: Seongnam Stadium, Seongnam
- Man of the Match: Lee Woon-jae (Suwon Samsung Bluewings)
- Referee: Choi Kwang-bo
- Attendance: 15,364

The 2009 Korean FA Cup final was a football match played on 8 November 2009 at Seongnam Stadium in Seongnam that decided the champions of the 2009 Korean FA Cup. It was contested between Seongnam Ilhwa Chunma and Suwon Samsung Bluewings and kicked off at 14:00 (KST).

== Road to the final ==
Seongnam Ilhwa Chunma		Round	Suwon Samsung Bluewings	
Opponent	Result	Round	Opponent	Result
Busan Transportation Corporation (H)	5–2	Round of 32	Nowon Hummel Korea (H)	1–0
Chung-Ang University (H)	1–0	Round of 16	Busan IPark (A)	1–0
Pohang Steelers (H)	2–1	Quarter-finals	Jeonnam Dragons (H)	3–0
Daejeon Citizen (A)	1–0	Semi-finals	Jeonbuk Hyundai Motors (H)	3–0

== Details ==
8 November 2009
14:00 KST

Seongnam Ilhwa Chunma	1–1 (a.e.t.)	Suwon Samsung Bluewings
Radončić 27'		Edu 87' (pen.)
Penalties
Ognenovski (penalty scored); Radončić (penalty scored); Kim Sung-hwan (penalty missed); Jeon Kwang-jin (penalty missed)	2–4	Edu (penalty scored); Yang Sang-min (penalty scored); Tiago (penalty missed); Kim Do-heon (penalty scored); Kim Dae-eui (penalty scored)

Seongnam Stadium, Seongnam
Attendance: 15,364
Referee: Choi Kwang-bo

Seongnam Ilhwa Chunma	Suwon Samsung Bluewings

GK	44	(South Korea) Kim Yong-dae
RB	16	(South Korea) Kim Sung-hwan
CB	6	(South Korea) Jeon Kwang-jin
CB	4	(Australia) Sasa Ognenovski
LB	33	(South Korea) Jang Hak-young
CM	8	(South Korea) Lee Ho	(yellow card) 17'
CM	14	(South Korea) Kim Jung-woo (c)
RM	18	(South Korea) Cho Dong-geon		(substituted off) 60'
AM	11	(Colombia) Mauricio Molina
LM	20	(South Korea) Kim Jin-yong	(yellow card) 9'	(substituted off) 72'
CF	10	(Montenegro) Dženan Radončić
Substitutes:
GK	1	(South Korea) Jung Sung-ryong
DF	39	(South Korea) Kim Tae-yoon		(substituted on) 72'	(substituted off) 100'
MF	17	(South Korea) Kim Cheol-ho		(substituted on) 60'
MF	23	(Brazil) Fabrício Souza	(yellow card) 101'		(substituted on) 100'
DF	2	(South Korea) Ko Jae-sung
DF	5	(South Korea) Cho Byung-kuk
FW	9	(South Korea) Hong Jin-sub
FW	15	(South Korea) Han Dong-won
DF	40	(South Korea) Park Woo-hyun
Manager:
(South Korea) Shin Tae-yong

GK	1	(South Korea) Lee Woon-jae (c)
RB	15	(South Korea) Hong Soon-hak	(yellow card) 58'
CB	5	(China) Li Weifeng
CB	29	(South Korea) Kwak Hee-ju	(yellow card) 75'
LB	3	(South Korea) Yang Sang-min
RM	19	(South Korea) Kim Dae-eui
CM	17	(North Korea) An Yong-hak		(substituted off) 46'
CM	4	(South Korea) Kim Do-heon	(yellow card) 92'
LM	8	(South Korea) Song Chong-gug
CF	28	(South Korea) Ha Tae-gyun
CF	9	(Brazil) Edu	(yellow card) 82'
Substitutes:
GK	31	(South Korea) Park Ho-jin
DF	25	(South Korea) Choi Sung-hwan
DF	38	(South Korea) Heo Jae-won
MF	7	(South Korea) Lee Sang-ho
MF	20	(South Korea) Baek Ji-hoon
MF	22	(South Korea) Lee Kil-hoon		(substituted on) 46'	(substituted off) 74'
FW	16	(South Korea) Bae Ki-jong			(substituted on) 74'	(substituted off) 112'
FW	23	(Brazil) Tiago
FW	27	(South Korea) Seo Dong-hyeon				(substituted on) 112'
Manager:
(South Korea) Cha Bum-kun

Man of the Match:
Lee Woon-jae (Suwon Samsung Bluewings)

Assistant referees:
Kim Kye-soo
Jeong Hae-sang
Fourth official:
Choi Myung-yong

Match rules

- 90 minutes
- 30 minutes of extra time if necessary
- Penalty shoot-out if scores still level
- Nine named substitutes
- Maximum of three substitutions

== See also ==
- 2009 Korean FA Cup
