= Shin Dong-geun (disambiguation) =

Shin Dong-gun (Korean: 신동근) is a Korean name. Relevant people of this name are:

- Shin Dong-kun (born 1961): South Korean dentist and politician
- Shin Dong-keun (born 1981): South Korean football player
- Peniel Shin (Traditional Korean name Shin Dong-geun, born 1993), American singer and a member of South Korean boy band BtoB
