= Fabrício Souza =

Fabrício Souza may refer to:

- Fabrício de Souza, (born 1982), Brazilian footballer
- Fabrício Eduardo Souza, (born 1980), Brazilian footballer
