= Jeong Ho-jeong =

South Korean footballer (born 1988)

Personal information
- Date of birth: 1 September 1988 (age 38)
- Place of birth: South Korea
- Height: 1.80 m (5 ft 11 in)
- Position: Defender

Team information
- Current team: Busan IPark
- Number: 2

Youth career
- Kwangwoon University

Senior career*
Years	Team	Apps	(Gls)
2010–2013	Seongnam Ilhwa Chunma	7	(0)
2012–2013	→ Sangju Sangmu (army)	21	(0)
2014–2016	Gwangju FC	84	(0)
2017–	Busan IPark	53	(0)
Korean name
Hangul	정호정
Hanja	鄭好正
RR	Jeong Hojeong
MR	Chŏng Hojŏng
- * Club domestic league appearances and goals as of 12 November 2019

Jeong Ho-jeong (Korean: 정호정; born 1 September 1988) is a South Korean football defender. He currently plays for Busan IPark.

== Club career ==
Jeong was one of Seongnam's draft picks for the 2010 K-League season. Unused for the entire 2010 season, Jeong finally made his professional debut in Seongnam's first group match of the 2011 K-League Cup, against the Pohang Steelers on 16 March 2011.

== Club career statistics ==
As of 21 December 2019

Club performance			League		Cup		League Cup		Other		Total	
Season	Club	League	Apps	Goals	Apps	Goals	Apps	Goals	Apps	Goals	Apps	Goals
Korea Republic			League		FA Cup		League Cup		Play-offs		Total	
2010	Seongnam Ilhwa Chunma	K League 1	0	0	0	0	0	0	0	0	0	0
2011	Seongnam Ilhwa Chunma	K League 1	7	0	0	0	3	0	-		10	0
2012	Sangju Sangmu	K League 1	15	0	1	0	0	0	0	0	16	0
2013	Sangju Sangmu	K League 2	6	0	1	0	0	0	0	0	7	0
2014	Gwangju FC	K League 2	28	0	1	0	0	0	0	0	29	0
2015	Gwangju FC	K League 1	28	0	0	0	0	0	0	0	28	0
2016	Gwangju FC	K League 1	28	0	0	0	0	0	0	0	28	0
2017	Busan IPark	K League 2	25	0	2	0	0	0	1	0	28	0
2018	Busan IPark	K League 2	21	0	1	0	0	0	0	0	22	0
2019	Busan IPark	K League 2	7	0	0	0	0	0	0	0	7	0
Career total			165	0	6	0	3	0	1	0	175	0
