= Moon Dae-seong =

South Korean footballer (born 1986)

Personal information
- Date of birth: 15 March 1986 (age 40)
- Place of birth: South Korea
- Height: 1.73 m (5 ft 8 in)
- Position: Forward

Senior career*
Years	Team	Apps	(Gls)
2007–2008	Jeonbuk Hyundai Motors	9	(1)
2009–2010	Seongnam Ilhwa Chunma	20	(2)
2011	Ulsan Hyundai FC	2	(0)
- * Club domestic league appearances and goals

- Moon Dae-seong
- Hangul: 문대성
- Hanja: 文大成
- RR: Mun Daeseong
- MR: Mun Taesŏng

Moon Dae-seong (Korean: 문대성; Hanja: 文大成; born 15 March 1986) is a South Korean footballer.

He dropped out of the club on 12 August 2011.
