= Lee Chi-joon =

South Korean footballer

Lee Chi-Joon
Personal information
- Full name: Lee Chi-Joon (이치준)
- Date of birth: January 20, 1985 (age 41)
- Place of birth: South Korea
- Height: 1.73 m (5 ft 8 in)
- Position: Defender

Team information
- Current team: Suwon FC
- Number: 3

Senior career*
| Years | Team | Apps | (Gls) |
| 2008–2013 | Seongnam Ilhwa Chunma | 1 | (0) |
| 2012–2013 | → Police FC (army) | 20 | (0) |
| 2014– | Suwon FC | 21 | (0) |
- * Club domestic league appearances and goals as of 27 November 2014

- Lee Chi-joon
- Hangul: 이치준
- Hanja: 李治準
- RR: I Chijun
- MR: I Ch'ijun

Lee Chi-Joon (born January 20, 1985) is a South Korean football player who since 2014 has played for Suwon FC.
