= Yong Jae-hyun =

South Korean footballer (born 1988)

Personal information
- Full name: Yong Jae-hyun
- Date of birth: 19 July 1988 (age 38)
- Place of birth: South Korea
- Height: 1.79 m (5 ft 10 1/2 in)
- Position: Full back

Team information
- Current team: FC Anyang
- Number: 88

Youth career
- Konkuk University

Senior career*
Years	Team	Apps	(Gls)
2010–2013	Seongnam Ilhwa	19	(0)
2012–2013	→ Sangju Sangmu (Army)	12	(0)
2014–2015	Incheon United FC	29	(0)
2016	Busan IPark	30	(1)
2017–	FC Anyang	18	(0)
- * Club domestic league appearances and goals as of 5 January 2018

- Yong Jae-hyun
- Hangul: 용재현
- RR: Yong Jaehyeon
- MR: Yong Chaehyŏn

Former name
- Hangul: 용현진
- RR: Yong Hyeonjin
- MR: Yong Hyŏnjin

Yong Jae-hyun (Korean: 용재현; born 19 July 1988) is a South Korean footballer who plays for FC Anyang in the K League Challenge. He is a versatile player, capable of playing at left back, right back, or defensive midfield. In 2015, he changed his name from Yong Hyun-jin (용현진) to Yong Jae-hyun.
