= Lee Sang-gi (footballer, born 1987) =

South Korean footballer

Personal information
- Date of birth: 8 March 1987 (age 39)
- Place of birth: South Korea
- Height: 1.91 m (6 ft 3 in)
- Position: Goalkeeper

Youth career
- 2003–2005: Suncheon High School
- 2006–2009: Sungkyunkwan University

Senior career*
Years	Team	Apps	(Gls)
2010	Seongnam Ilhwa Chunma	0	(0)
2011–2013	Suwon Samsung Bluewings	1	(0)
2011–2013	→ Sangju Sangmu Phoenix (army)	10	(0)
2014	Suwon FC	20	(0)
2015	Gangwon FC	12	(0)
2016–2017	Seoul E-Land	1	(0)
- * Club domestic league appearances and goals as of 22 January 2018

Lee Sang-gi (Korean: 이상기; born 8 March 1987) is a South Korean footballer who played as a goalkeeper.
