= Hong Jin-sub =

South Korean footballer (born 1985)

Hong Gein-Sub
Personal information
- Full name: Hong Gein-Sub (홍진섭)
- Date of birth: October 14, 1985 (age 41)
- Place of birth: Jeju, Korea Republic
- Height: 1.80 m (5 ft 11 in)
- Position: Forward

Senior career*
Years	Team	Apps	(Gls)
2008	Jeonbuk Hyundai Motors	12	(1)
2009–2011	Seongnam Ilhwa Chunma	23	(1)
2012	Yanbian Baekdu Tigers	17	(6)

International career
2004	South Korea U-20	1	(0)
- * Club domestic league appearances and goals

Hong Gein-Sub (born October 14, 1985) is a South Korean football player.
