= Shin Dong-keun =

South Korean footballer

Personal information
- Date of birth: 15 February 1981 (age 45)
- Place of birth: South Korea
- Height: 1.80 m (5 ft 11 in)
- Position: Midfielder

Youth career
- 2001–2004: Yonsei University

Senior career*
Years	Team	Apps	(Gls)
2005–2007	Seongnam Ilhwa Chunma	4	(0)
2008–2009	Gwangju Sangmu (Army)	19	(0)
2009	Seongnam Ilhwa Chunma	0	(0)
2010–2011	Goyang Kookmin Bank	21	(2)

International career
1999	South Korea U-20		
Korean name
Hangul	신동근
Hanja	申東根
RR	Sin Donggeun
MR	Sin Tonggŭn
- * Club domestic league appearances and goals as of 22 October 2011

Shin Dong-keun (Korean: 신동근; born 15 February 1981) is a South Korean football midfielder.

== Club career statistics ==
As of 22 October 2009

Club performance			League		Cup		League Cup		Continental		Total	
Season	Club	League	Apps	Goals	Apps	Goals	Apps	Goals	Apps	Goals	Apps	Goals
South Korea			League		KFA Cup		League Cup		Asia		Total	
2004	Seongnam Ilhwa	K-League	1	0	1	0	2	0	?	?	4	0
2005	Seongnam Ilhwa	K-League	1	0	1	1	0	0	-		2	1
2006	Seongnam Ilhwa	K-League	2	0	0	0	5	0	-		7	0
2007	Seongnam Ilhwa	K-League	0	0	0	0	0	0	?	?	0	0
2008	Gwangju Sangmu	K-League	17	0	3	0	5	0	-		25	0
2009	Gwangju Sangmu	K-League	2	0	1	0	3	0	-		6	0
2010	Goyang Kookmin Bank	National League	14	2	0	0	-		-		14	2
2011	Goyang Kookmin Bank	National League							-			
Total	Seongnam Ilhwa		4	0	2	1	7	0	-		13	1
Total	Gwangju Sangmu		19	0	4	0	8	0	-		31	0
Total	Goyang Kookmin Bank		14	2	0	0	-		-		14	2
Career total			23	0	6	1	15	0	-		58	3
