= Jo Jae-cheol =

South Korean footballer

Jo Jae-Cheol
Personal information
- Full name: Jo Jae-Cheol
- Date of birth: 18 May 1986 (age 40)
- Place of birth: Jeju Province, South Korea
- Height: 1.76 m (5 ft 9 1/2 in)
- Position: Attacking midfielder

Team information
- Current team: Cheonan City FC
- Number: 21

Youth career
- Ajou University

Senior career*
Years	Team	Apps	(Gls)
2010–2011	Seongnam Ilhwa	55	(4)
2012–2014	Gyeongnam FC	53	(3)
2014–2015	→ Ansan Police (army)	53	(7)
2016–2017	Seongnam FC	37	(4)
2018–2019	Gyeongnam FC	34	(4)
2020	Daejeon Hana Citizen FC	19	(0)
2021 -	Cheonan City FC	49	(5)
- * Club domestic league appearances and goals as of 21 October 2022

Jo Jae-Cheol (Korean: 조재철; born 18 May 1986) is a South Korean football player who plays for Cheonan City FC.

== Honors ==
=== Club ===
Seongnam Ilhwa Chunma

- 2010 AFC Champions League Winner
- 2011 FA Cup Winner
