= Jang Hak-young =

South Korean footballer

Jang Hak-Yong 장학영
Personal information
- Full name: Jang Hak-Yong
- Date of birth: August 24, 1981 (age 45)
- Place of birth: South Korea
- Height: 1.70 m (5 ft 7 in)
- Position: Left back

Youth career
- 2000–2003: Kyonggi University

Senior career*
Years	Team	Apps	(Gls)
2004–2010	Seongnam Ilhwa Chunma	156	(6)
2010–2012	→ Seoul United (loan)		
2012–2014	Busan IPark	93	(3)
2015–2017	Seongnam FC	60	(0)

International career^{‡}
2006	South Korea	5	(0)
- * Club domestic league appearances and goals as of 1 January 2018 ‡ National team caps and goals as of October 15, 2008

Jang Hak-yong (Korean: 장학영, born August 24, 1981) is a South Korean footballer.

In May 2010, he left his team to complete his mandatory military service.

A pacey and consistent left back, Jang was twice named in the official K-League Team of the Season, in 2006 and 2007. He also played for the Korean national team on five occasions.

== Club career statistics ==
Appearances and goals by club, season and competition
Club	Season	League			KFA Cup		League Cup		Asia		Total	
Club	Season	Division	Apps	Goals	Apps	Goals	Apps	Goals	Apps	Goals	Apps	Goals
Seongnam Ilhwa Chunma	2004	K League 1	9	0	1	0	7	0	?	?		
Seongnam Ilhwa Chunma	2005	K League 1	24	0	1	0	12	0	-		37	0
Seongnam Ilhwa Chunma	2006	K League 1	29	1	0	0	13	1	-		42	2
Seongnam Ilhwa Chunma	2007	K League 1	28	3	1	0	1	0	?	?		
Seongnam Ilhwa Chunma	2008	K League 1	26	1	2	0	11	0	-		39	1
Seongnam Ilhwa Chunma	2009	K League 1	29	0	5	0	7	0	-		41	0
Seongnam Ilhwa Chunma	2010	K League 1	11	2	0	0	4	1	4	0	19	3
Busan IPark	2012	K League 1	23	0	0	0	0	0	0	0	23	0
Busan IPark	2013	K League 1	37	3	3	0	0	0	0	0	40	3
Busan IPark	2014	K League 1	33	0	2	0	-	-	-	-	35	0
Career total			249	10	15	0	55	2				
