= Song Ho-young (footballer) =

South Korean footballer (born 1988)

Song Ho-Young
Personal information
- Full name: Song Ho-Young
- Date of birth: 21 January 1988 (age 38)
- Place of birth: Hwaseong, Gyeonggi, South Korea
- Height: 1.75 m (5 ft 9 in)
- Positions: Winger; striker

Team information
- Current team: Bucheon FC 1995
- Number: 10

Youth career
- 2007–2008: Hanyang University

Senior career*
Years	Team	Apps	(Gls)
2009	Gyeongnam FC	23	(3)
2010–2011	Seongnam Ilhwa Chunma	40	(2)
2012–2014	Jeju United	3	(0)
2013	→ Chunnam Dragons (loan)	5	(1)
2014	→ Gyeongnam FC (loan)	3	(0)
2014–	Bucheon FC 1995	0	(0)
- * Club domestic league appearances and goals as of 28 November 2014

Song Ho-Young (Korean: 송호영; born 21 January 1988) is a South Korean football forward, who plays for Bucheon FC 1995 in K League Challenge.

== Club career ==
=== Gyeonam FC ===
In 2009, he was drafted to Gyeongnam FC. On 8 March 2009, he made his first K-League appearance in the 1:1 drawn against Jeonbuk Hyundai Motors at the Changwon Civil Stadium. On 10 May 2009, he scored his first goal, the winning goal of the match in a 1:0 defeat against Gangwon FC and scored his 2nd goal in the 4:1 victory against Chunnam Dragons on 6 September. On 25 October 2009, Song scored a brace for Gyeonam during a 4:1 win against Seongnam Ilhwa Chunma at the Changwon Civil Stadium.

== Honors ==
=== Club ===
Seongnam Ilhwa Chunma

- 2010 AFC Champions League Winner
- 2011 FA Cup Winner
