= Choi Sung-kuk =

South Korean football player (born 1983)

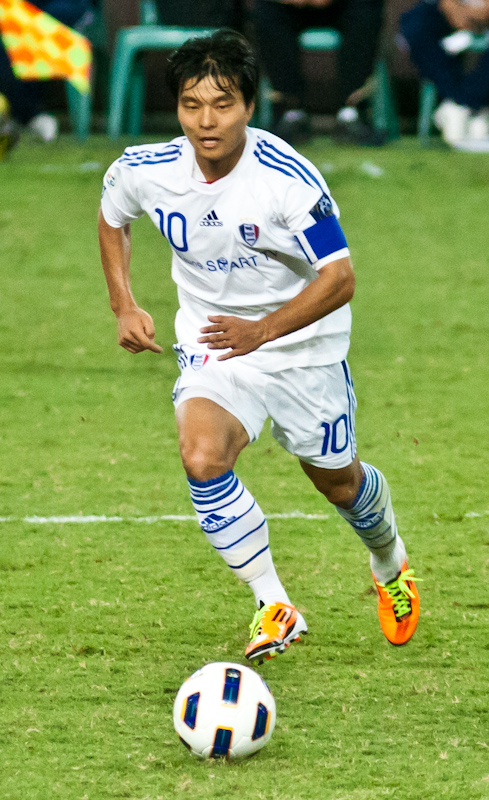
- Choi with Suwon Samsung Bluewings in 2011

Personal information
- Full name: Choi Sung-kuk
- Date of birth: 8 February 1983 (age 43)
- Place of birth: Seoul, South Korea
- Height: 1.72 m (5 ft 8 in)
- Position: Second striker

College career
Years	Team	Apps	(Gls)
2001–2002	Korea University		

Senior career*
Years	Team	Apps	(Gls)
2003–2006	Ulsan Hyundai Horang-i	84	(10)
2005	→ Kashiwa Reysol (loan)	8	(0)
2007–2010	Seongnam Ilhwa Chunma	49	(7)
2009–2010	→ Gwangju Sangmu (draft)	48	(13)
2011	Suwon Samsung Bluewings	12	(1)
Total		201	(31)

International career
1997–1998	South Korea U17	6	(2)
1999–2003	South Korea U20	20	(12)
2001–2006	South Korea U23	40 (Note: Includes one appearance considered non-international.)	(3)
2002–2011	South Korea	26	(2)
Medal record
Representing South Korea
Men's football
AFC Asian Cup
Bronze medal – third place	2007 Indonesia/Malaysia /Thailand/Vietnam	Team
Asian Games
Bronze medal – third place	2002 Busan	Team
AFC Youth Championship
Gold medal – first place	2002 Qatar	Team
- * Club domestic league appearances and goals

- Choi Sung-kuk
- Hangul: 최성국
- Hanja: 崔成國
- RR: Choe Seongguk
- MR: Ch'oe Sŏngguk

Choi Sung-kuk (born 8 February 1983) is a former South Korean footballer who played as a second striker. He was banned by FIFA from all football-related activities because of his involvement in match fixing.

== Early life ==
Born in Seoul, Choi began playing football at Donggok Elementary School. While he played for Jeongmyeong High School, his talent earned him a nickname of "Korean Maradona". After graduated from high school, Choi attended Korea University for two years.

== Club career ==
Choi joined K League club Ulsan Hyundai Horang-I on 27 February 2003. He adapted quickly to the professional league, scoring seven goals in his debut season. He was nominated for the K League Rookie of the Year award, but lost out to Jung Jo-gook.

In his second season, Choi couldn't concentrate on his club by playing for Olympic team, and scored only one goal during 19 league appearances. He was loaned out to J1 League club Kashiwa Reysol ahead of the 2005 season, but didn't make the reversal of his flow for five months.

Choi became the top goalscorer in the 2006 Korean League Cup, showing his improvement the next year. He also left a memorable game against Al-Shabab in the 2006 AFC Champions League, where he led Ulsan to a 6–0 victory by destroying opponents' defense as well as scoring two goals. He moved to Seongnam Ilhwa Chunma after the 2006 season.

Choi went on a trial at Championship side Sheffield United after the end of the 2007 season, but the club decided against signing him. Choi who remained in his country participated in the 2008 Jomo Cup contested between all-star teams of K League and J.League. He led K League to a 3–1 win by having a goal and an assist in the Jomo Cup and was selected as the MVP of the match. In December 2008, Choi enlisted in military football team Gwangju Sangmu to fulfill his military duty.

Choi moved to Suwon Samsung Bluewings prior to the 2011 season, signing a three–year contract. Shortly after, he was announced as the new captain for Suwon. However, Choi was implicated in match-fixing scandal while playing for Gwangju Sangmu. He denied his involvement when media reports raised the allegations about throwing matches, but soon admitted it as the scandal deepened. Consequently, he was tentatively dropped from his team and stripped of his captaincy.

It was officially announced in August 2011 that he would not be able to play in all leagues in South Korea permanently. It was announced that Choi would join Macedonian club Rabotnički on 16 January 2012, but following investigation, FIFA imposed on him a lifelong ban from all sports. His move fell through after the Football Federation of Macedonia rejected his registration.

== International career ==
While at Jeongmyeong High School, Choi was called up to South Korean under-17 team for the 1998 AFC U-16 Championship, and scored two goals in six appearances.

Choi was selected for South Korean under-23 team for the 2002 Asian Games, helping his team finish third. He then won the 2002 AFC Youth Championship with South Korean under-20 team.

In March 2003, Choi was called up to the senior national team for the first time, and made his debut in a 0–0 draw against Colombia. He scored his first senior international goal in a 1–0 victory over Oman in the 2004 AFC Asian Cup qualification. He then played for the under-20 team in the 2003 FIFA World Youth Championship despite suffering an injury. He got only two caps in the tournament, but was selected as one of twelve notable players by FIFA.

Choi also participated in the 2004 Summer Olympics, where South Korea reached the quarter-finals.

Choi was called up to South Korea's squad for the 2007 AFC Asian Cup. He scored a goal in the opening match against Saudi Arabia. South Korea finished third in the tournament after beating Japan in the third place play-off.

== Personal life ==
Choi's mother Kim Jae-young was an artistic gymnast, and Choi's father was also a field hockey player while at school. His father who worked as a bus driver couldn't become an adult player, but taught him to be unassuming. In December 2005, Choi was married Kwak Seon-hye, and became a father a year later.

Choi is a devout Christian.

It was reported on 9 February 2012 that Choi was sentenced on probation for two years and 200 hours of social services for ten months as a result of his actions, relating to match fixing.

Following an end to his professional football career, Choi was hired to work in the hospital as a clerk. He acknowledged that since his football career ended, his family began to struggle economically.

In January 2014, Choi was caught by police for driving under the influence.

In April 2016, Choi was hired as a commentator for sports website Spoplay.

In July 2016, a man was sentenced to six years in prison for threatening both Choi and Kim Dong-hyun.

Seven years later after his professional football career came to an end, he spoke out in an interview about his role to match fixing.

== Career statistics ==
=== Club ===
Appearances and goals by club, season and competition
Club	Season	League			National cup		League cup		Continental		Total	
Club	Season	Division	Apps	Goals	Apps	Goals	Apps	Goals	Apps	Goals	Apps	Goals
Ulsan Hyundai Horang-i	2003	K League	27	7	0	0	—		—		27	7
Ulsan Hyundai Horang-i	2004	K League	19	1	4	3	0	0	—		23	4
Ulsan Hyundai Horang-i	2005	K League	16	1	1	0	0	0	—		17	1
Ulsan Hyundai Horang-i	2006	K League	22	1	1	0	13	8	4	4	40	13
Ulsan Hyundai Horang-i	Total		84	10	6	3	13	8	4	4	107	25
Kashiwa Reysol	2005	J1 League	8	0	0	0	4	0	—		12	0
Seongnam Ilhwa Chunma	2007	K League	27	3	0	0	1	0	8	3	36	6
Seongnam Ilhwa Chunma	2008	K League	18	4	2	0	8	3	—		28	7
Seongnam Ilhwa Chunma	2010	K League	4	0	0	0	0	0	3	1	7	1
Seongnam Ilhwa Chunma	Total		49	7	2	0	9	3	11	4	71	14
Gwangju Sangmu (draft)	2009	K League	26	9	0	0	2	0	—		28	9
Gwangju Sangmu (draft)	2010	K League	22	4	3	1	2	0	—		27	5
Gwangju Sangmu (draft)	Total		48	13	3	1	4	0	—		55	14
Suwon Samsung Bluewings	2011	K League	12	1	1	1	0	0	6	0	19	2
Career total			201	31	12	5	30	11	21	8	264	55

=== International ===
Appearances and goals by national team and year
National team	Year	Apps	Goals
South Korea	2003	4	1
South Korea	2004	4	0
South Korea	2005	3	0
South Korea	2006	3	0
South Korea	2007	7	1
South Korea	2008	3	0
South Korea	2010	1	0
South Korea	2011	1	0
Career total		26	2

Results list South Korea's goal tally first.

List of international goals scored by Choi Sung-kuk
No.	Date	Venue	Opponent	Score	Result	Competition
1	27 September 2003	Incheon, South Korea	Oman	1–0	1–0	2004 AFC Asian Cup qualification
2	11 July 2007	Jakarta, Indonesia	Saudi Arabia	1–0	1–1	2007 AFC Asian Cup

== Honours ==
Ulsan Hyundai Horang-i

- K League 1: 2005
- Korean Super Cup: 2006
- A3 Champions Cup: 2006
- Korean League Cup runner-up: 2005

Seongnam Ilhwa Chunma

- AFC Champions League: 2010

South Korea U20

- AFC Youth Championship: 2002

South Korea U23

- Asian Games bronze medal: 2002

South Korea

- AFC Asian Cup third place: 2007

Individual

- Korean FA Cup top goalscorer: 2001
- K League All-Star: 2003, 2004, 2006, 2008, 2009, 2010
- Korean League Cup top goalscorer: 2006
- K League All-Star Game Most Valuable Player: 2008

== Notes ==
Sporting positions
Preceded by Cho Won-hee	Suwon Samsung Bluewings captain 2011	Succeeded by Yeom Ki-hun
