= Kim Cheol-ho (footballer) =

South Korean footballer (born 1983)

Personal information
- Date of birth: September 26, 1983 (age 43)
- Place of birth: Miryang, South Gyeongsang, South Korea
- Height: 1.78 m (5 ft 10 in)
- Position: Defensive midfielder

Youth career
- 1999–2001: Jungmyong High School
- 2002–2003: Kangwon Tourism College

Senior career*
| Years | Team | Apps | (Gls) |
| 2004–2015 | Seongnam | 263 | (10) |
| 2011–2012 | → Sangju Sangmu (army) | 48 | (3) |
| 2016 | Chonburi | 13 | (0) |
| 2016–2018 | Suwon FC | 16 | (0) |
| 2020 | Jeonju Bluebird | | |
- * Club domestic league appearances and goals as of 13 January 2019

- Kim Cheol-ho
- Hangul: 김철호
- Hanja: 金喆淏
- RR: Gim Cheolho
- MR: Kim Ch'ŏrho

Kim Cheol-ho (Korean: 김철호; born September 26, 1983) is a South Korean football player.

== Summary ==
=== Club career ===
In 2003, Kim joined South Korea Futsal National Team, and in 2004, he got the recommendation of the head coach of the Futsal National team and entered into Seongnam Ilhwa Chunma with the signing fee US$100,000. Coaches said that he was really impressive with his amount of activity. Even though he was not the first squad member in year 2004, he became the first squad from the next year, 2005. Year 2006, he did 26 appearances and the Seongnam Ilhwa won K League champion and League cup runner-up. The most impressive time is that he scored at AFC Final match versus Zob Ahan in year 2010. Due to this goal, Seongnam Ilhwa won AFC Champion as the second time. After that, he entered Sangju Sangmu for his military service. After finishing his military service, he back to Seongnam Ilhwa and played as the defensive midfielder. He scored 2 goals among 3 goals of team's total until 10 round of the league. His performance was prodigious in terms of both quantity and quality with his veteran experience.

== League statistics ==
| Club | League | Year | Apps | Sub | Goal | Assist | Y/C | R/C |
|---|---|---|---|---|---|---|---|---|
| Seongnam Ilhwa | K League | 2004 | 18 | 4 | 0 | 2 | 3 | 0 |
| Seongnam Ilhwa | K League | 2005 | 33 | 8 | 1 | 0 | 4 | 0 |
| Seongnam Ilhwa | K League | 2006 | 26 | 8 | 1 | 1 | 5 | 0 |
| Seongnam Ilhwa | K League | 2007 | 9 | 4 | 1 | 0 | 2 | 0 |
| Seongnam Ilhwa | K League | 2008 | 29 | 14 | 0 | 2 | 6 | 0 |
| Seongnam Ilhwa | K League | 2009 | 32 | 22 | 0 | 0 | 3 | 0 |
| Seongnam Ilhwa | K League | 2010 | 27 | 19 | 3 | 2 | 3 | 0 |
| Sangju Sangmu | K League | 2011 | 29 | 7 | 1 | 4 | 4 | 0 |
| Sangju Sangmu | K League | 2012 | 19 | 10 | 2 | 0 | 1 | 0 |
| Seongnam Ilhwa | K League | 2012 | 7 | 5 | 0 | 1 | 3 | 0 |
| Seongnam Ilhwa | K League Classic | 2013 | 29 | 9 | 1 | 2 | 5 | 1 |
| Seongnam Ilhwa | K League Classic | 2014 | 10 | 0 | 2 | 0 | 0 | 0 |
| Total (K League) | K League Classic | - | 268 | 110 | 12 | 14 | 39 | 1 |

League records include K-League Cup. As of April 28th, 2014

== Honors ==
=== Club ===
Seongnam Ilhwa Chunma

- K League (1): 2006
- League Cup (1): 2004
- AFC Champions League (1): 2010
