= Fabrício Souza (footballer) =

Brazilian footballer (born 1980)

Personal information
- Full name: Fabrício Eduardo Souza
- Date of birth: January 4, 1980 (age 46)
- Place of birth: Divinópolis, Brazil
- Height: 1.78 m (5 ft 10 in)
- Position: Attacking midfielder

Team information
- Current team: Rio Verde

Senior career*
Years	Team	Apps	(Gls)
1995–1996	Portuguesa	4	(0)
1998–2001	América-MG	51	(7)
2002–2006	Atlético Paranaense	55	(5)
2006–2009	Al Khor	65	(13)
2009	Umm-Salal	8	(1)
2009–2010	Seongnam Ilhwa Chunma	22	(5)
2010–2011	Sport	13	(1)
2011	América-MG	9	(0)
2012	Guarani	4	(1)
2013–	Rio Verde		
- * Club domestic league appearances and goals as of 13 March 2013

Fabrício Eduardo Souza (born 4 January 1980) is a Brazilian footballer who currently plays for Rio Verde.

== Club career ==
Fabrício Souza previously played for Portuguesa, América-MG and Atlético-PR in the Campeonato Brasileiro Série A and Al-Khor in the Qatari League. In July 2009, he moved to K-League side Seongnam Ilhwa Chunma

He returned Brazil after his contract with Seongnam was done. He signed a contract with Sport Recife in 2010.

=== Club ===
Club	Season	Division	League		Emir of Qatar Cup		Sheikh Jassim Cup		Total	
Club	Season	Division	Apps	Goals	Apps	Goals	Apps	Goals	Apps	Goals
Al-Khor	2006–07	QSL	23	6	4	1	-	0	23	6
Al-Khor	2007–08	QSL	27	3	2	0	-	0	27	3
Al-Khor	2008–09	QSL	15	4	0	0	-	0	15	4
Al-Khor	Total		65	13	6	1	0	0	71	14
Umm Salal	2008–09	QSL	8	1	1	0	0	0	8	1
Umm Salal	Total		8	1	1	0	0	0	8	1
Career total			73	14	7	1	-	0	80	15
