= Mauricio Molina =

Colombian footballer (born 1980)

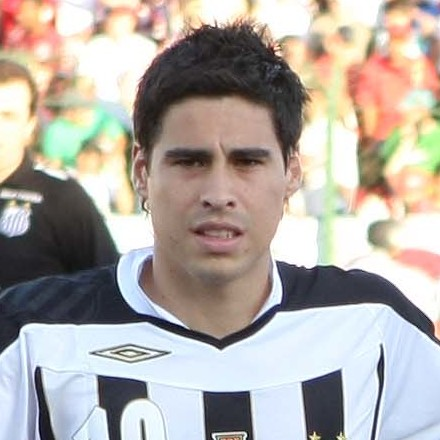
- Molina in 2008

Personal information
- Full name: Mauricio Alejandro Molina Uribe
- Date of birth: 30 April 1980 (age 46)
- Place of birth: Medellín, Colombia
- Height: 1.77 m (5 ft 10 in)
- Position: Midfielder

Youth career
- 1997–1998: Envigado

Senior career*
Years	Team	Apps	(Gls)
1998–2001	Envigado	83	(25)
2001–2002	Santa Fé	16	(5)
2002–2003	Medellín	43	(14)
2003–2004	Morelia	24	(1)
2004–2005	Al Ain	10	(0)
2005–2007	Medellín	16	(5)
2006	→ San Lorenzo (loan)	24	(0)
2007	→ Olimpia (loan)	17	(5)
2007–2008	Red Star Belgrade	11	(2)
2008–2009	Santos	20	(8)
2009–2010	Seongnam FC	46	(21)
2011–2015	FC Seoul	159	(46)
2016–2017	Medellín	60	(11)

International career
2001–2003	Colombia	12	(1)
Medal record
Representing Colombia
Copa América
Winner	2001 Colombia
- * Club domestic league appearances and goals

Mauricio Alejandro Molina Uribe (Note: In this name that follows Hispanic American naming customs, the first or paternal surname is Molina and the second or maternal family name is Uribe.) (Latin American Spanish: [mawˈɾisjo moˈlina]; born 30 April 1980) is a Colombian former professional footballer who played as a midfielder.

== Club career ==
Molina started his career in Colombian side Envigado at the age of 16. He soon made his way up to the first team and was transferred to Independiente Santa Fé in 2001.

In 2002 he joined Independiente Medellín and later that year led the team to its first national championship in 45 years and the third overall. In 2003, he helped the team reach the semi-finals of the Copa Libertadores.

After the successful campaign with Independiente Medellín he moved to CA Morelia of Mexico until 2004.

After Morelia, Molina went to the United Arab Emirates to play for Al Ain where he stayed for a semester, after which he returned to his best memories with Independiente Medellin for another semester. Molina then played for San Lorenzo de Almagro of Argentina from 2005 to 2006.

In 2007, Molina signed with Paraguayan Club Olimpia where he played the first semester of the year. After a very successful campaign with the team in which he was the co-scorer with 10 goals, Molina was transferred for the second semester of 2007 to Red Star Belgrade, his first European club.

In 2008, he joined Brazilian club Santos. He made his debut as a Santos player on 13 February 2008, starting against Cúcuta Deportivo of Colombia in the 2008 Copa Libertadores. He scored his first goal for the club on 24 February, in a 4-1 Campeonato Paulista victory against Ituano. On 27 July 2008, he scored twice in a 5–2 victory against Vasco. At the time he departed the club, he became the 2nd highest scoring foreign player in Santos history, with 17 goals.

In July 2009, Molina moves to South Korean club Seongnam Ilhwa Chunma for $1,275,000. He scored in his debut against the Pohang Steelers. In all K-League competitions, Molina scored 22 goals along with 11 assists in 50 appearances for Seongnam Ilhwa Chunma. Molina was an instrumental player for the Korean club during the path to the 2010 AFC Champions League title, where he scored seven goals.

On 24 January 2011, Molina signed for K League Classic side FC Seoul on a three-year contract. He had an excellent 2012 season, where he scored 19 goals in 43 appearances and won the league title.

On 31 December 2015, Molina returned to Independiente Medellín, where he played for two more seasons before finally retiring from professional football, tenure during which he acted as a co-captain for the team and helped them win the 2016 Torneo Apertura, his second with the club and their 6th league title overall.

== International career ==
At international level, Molina was part of the Colombia national team that won the 2001 Copa América.

== Career statistics ==
=== Club ===
Appearances and goals by club, season and competition
Club	Season	League			KFA Cup		League Cup		Continental		Other		Total	
Club	Season	Division	Apps	Goals	Apps	Goals	Apps	Goals	Apps	Goals	Apps	Goals	Apps	Goals
Seongnam Ilhwa Chunma	2009	K League 1	17	10	2	1	0	0	—		—		19	11
Seongnam Ilhwa Chunma	2010	K League 1	29	11	3	2	4	1	11	7	—		47	21
Seongnam Ilhwa Chunma	Total		46	21	!5	3	4	1	11	7	—		66	32
FC Seoul	2011	K League 1	29	10	2	1	0	0	8	2	—		39	13
FC Seoul	2012	K League 1	41	18	2	1	—		—		—		43	19
FC Seoul	2013	K League 1	35	9	1	1	—		13	1	—		49	11
FC Seoul	2014	K League 1	19	5	4	0	—		4	0	—		27	5
FC Seoul	2015	K League 1	35	4	5	1	—		7	1	—		47	6
FC Seoul	Total		159	46	14	4	0	0	32	4	—		205	54
Medellín	2016	Categoría Primera A	39	9	4	2	—		8	0	—		51	11
Medellín	2017	Categoría Primera A	21	2	5	1	—		4	0	2	0	32	3
Medellín	Total		60	11	9	3	—		12	0	2	0	83	14
Career total			265	78	28	10	4	1	55	11	2	0	354	100

=== International ===
Scores and results list Colombia's goal tally first.

#	Date	Venue	Opponent	Score	Final	Competition
1.	17 July 2003	Miami Orange Bowl, Miami, United States	Guatemala	1–1	1–1	2003 CONCACAF Gold Cup

== Honours ==
Independiente Medellin

- Categoría Primera A: 2002-II, 2016-I

Seongnam Ilhwa Chunma

- AFC Champions League: 2010

FC Seoul

- K League: 2012
- Korean FA Cup: 2015

Colombia

- Copa América: 2001

Individual

- FIFA Club World Cup top scorer: 2010 (three goals)
- K League Best XI: 2010, 2012
- K League Top Assists Award: 2012, 2013
