= Jeon Kwang-jin =

South Korean footballer (born 1981)

Personal information
- Date of birth: 30 June 1981 (age 45)
- Place of birth: South Korea
- Height: 1.78 m (5 ft 10 in)
- Position: Centre midfielder

Youth career
- 1997–1999: Taesung High School
- 2000–2003: Myongji University

Senior career*
Years	Team	Apps	(Gls)
2004–2010	Seongnam Ilhwa Chunma	67	(1)
2006–2007	→ Gwangju Sangmu Bulsajo	41	(0)
2011	Dalian Shide	3	(0)
2012	Chonburi	4	(0)

International career
- South Korea
- * Club domestic league appearances and goals as of 28 August 2011

- Jeon Kwang-jin
- Hangul: 전광진
- Hanja: 全光眞
- RR: Jeon Gwangjin
- MR: Chŏn Kwangjin

Jeon Kwang-jin (Korean: 전광진; Hanja: 全光眞; born 30 June 1981) is a South Korean footballer. He played for Seongnam Ilhwa Chunma, Gwangju Sangmu Bulsajo and Chinese Super League side Dalian Shide.

Cheon transferred to Dalian Shide in January 2011 but was released in July for his involvement in the 2011 South Korean football match-fixing scandal.

== Club career statistics ==
Club performance			League		Cup		League Cup		Continental		Total	
Season	Club	League	Apps	Goals	Apps	Goals	Apps	Goals	Apps	Goals	Apps	Goals
Korea Republic			League		FA Cup		K-League Cup		Asia		Total	
2004	Seongnam Ilhwa Chunma	K League	10	0	1	0	9	0			20	0
2005	Seongnam Ilhwa Chunma	K League	2	0	0	0	7	0	-		9	0
2006	Gwangju Sangmu Bulsajo	K League	25	0	1	0	9	0	-		35	0
2007	Gwangju Sangmu Bulsajo	K League	16	0	2	0	9	0	-		27	0
2008	Seongnam Ilhwa Chunma	K League	7	0	2	0	2	0	-		11	0
2009	Seongnam Ilhwa Chunma	K League	20	0	4	0	3	0	-		27	0
2010	Seongnam Ilhwa Chunma	K League	28	1	3	0	4	1	13	1	48	3
China PR			League		FA Cup		League Cup		Asia		Total	
2011	Dalian Shide	Chinese Super League	3	0	0	0	-		-		3	0
Country	Korea Republic		108	1	13	0	43	1	13	1	177	3
Country	China PR		3	0	0	0	-		-		3	0
Total			111	1	13	0	43	1	13	1	180	3
