= Dženan Radončić =

Montenegrin footballer (born 1983)

Personal information
- Date of birth: 2 August 1983 (age 43)
- Place of birth: Gusinje, SFR Yugoslavia
- Height: 1.92 m (6 ft 4 in)
- Position: Forward

Youth career
- Gusinje

Senior career*
Years	Team	Apps	(Gls)
2002–2003	Rudar Pljevlja	18	(5)
2003	Partizan	4	(0)
2004–2008	Incheon United	95	(24)
2007	→ Ventforet Kofu (loan)	9	(1)
2009–2011	Seongnam Ilhwa Chunma	65	(20)
2012–2013	Suwon Bluewings	43	(16)
2013	→ Shimizu S-Pulse (loan)	15	(6)
2014	Omiya Ardija	8	(0)
2014	Oita Trinita	7	(4)
2015	Mornar	5	(0)
Total		269	(76)

Managerial career
- 2021–2022: Indonesia (assistant)
- 2021–2022: Indonesia U23 (assistant)
- 2021–2022: Indonesia U20 (assistant)
- 2022: Indonesia U20 (caretaker)
- * Club domestic league appearances and goals

Dženan Radončić (Cyrillic: Џенан Радончић; born 2 August 1983) is a Montenegrin retired professional footballer who played as a forward.

== Career ==
In June 2003, Radončić was transferred from Rudar Pljevlja to Partizan on a four-year contract. He only appeared in four league games, but also managed to make his UEFA Champions League debut in a 1–1 home draw with Marseille, all as a substitute.

However, just half a year upon joining Partizan, Radončić moved to the Far East and joined newly founded K League club Incheon United. He played a major part in United's run to the championship playoff final in 2005. After falling out of favour with caretaker manager Park Lee-chun, Radončić went on loan to J.League side Ventforet Kofu during the 2007 season. He returned to Incheon for 2008, becoming the team's top scorer that season with 13 league goals.

In January 2009, Radončić switched to K League rivals Seongnam Ilhwa Chunma. He was a regular member of the team that won the AFC Champions League in 2010, but missed the final due to accumulated yellow cards.

In December 2011, Radončić signed a three-year deal with fellow K League side Suwon Samsung Bluewings. He moved on loan to J.League club Shimizu S-Pulse in August 2013.

== Career statistics ==
Appearances and goals by club, season and competition
Club	Season	League			National cup		League cup		Continental		Other		Total	
Club	Season	Division	Apps	Goals	Apps	Goals	Apps	Goals	Apps	Goals	Apps	Goals	Apps	Goals
Rudar Pljevlja	2002–03	First League of Serbia and Montenegro	18	5	0	0	—		—		—		18	5
Partizan	2003–04	First League of Serbia and Montenegro	4	0	0	0	—		2	0	—		6	0
Incheon United	2004	K League	13	0	1	0	3	0	—		—		17	0
Incheon United	2005	K League	22	9	2	1	5	4	—		—		29	14
Incheon United	2006	K League	23	1	4	0	8	1	—		—		35	2
Incheon United	2007	K League	11	1	1	0	5	1	—		—		17	2
Incheon United	2008	K League	26	13	1	0	6	1	—		—		33	14
Incheon United	Total		95	24	9	1	27	7	—		—		131	32
Ventforet Kofu (loan)	2007	J. League Division 1	9	1	0	0	0	0	—		—		9	1
Seongnam Ilhwa Chunma	2009	K League	28	5	4	0	5	2	—		—		37	7
Seongnam Ilhwa Chunma	2010	K League	27	12	3	0	4	1	10	4	3	0	47	17
Seongnam Ilhwa Chunma	2011	K League	10	3	3	2	0	0	—		—		13	5
Seongnam Ilhwa Chunma	Total		65	20	10	2	9	3	10	4	3	0	97	29
Suwon Samsung Bluewings	2012	K League	31	12	3	1	—		—		—		34	13
Suwon Samsung Bluewings	2013	K League Classic	12	4	2	0	—		4	0	—		18	4
Suwon Samsung Bluewings	Total		43	16	5	1	—		4	0	—		52	17
Shimizu S-Pulse (loan)	2013	J. League Division 1	15	6	3	1	—		—		—		18	7
Omiya Ardija	2014	J. League Division 1	8	0	—		3	0	—		—		11	0
Oita Trinita	2014	J. League Division 2	7	4	0	0	—		—		—		7	4
Mornar	2015–16	Montenegrin First League	5	0	1	0	—		—		—		6	0
Career total			269	76	28	5	39	10	20	4	3	0	359	95

== Honours ==
Seongnam Ilhwa Chunma

- AFC Champions League: 2010
- Korean FA Cup: 2011
