= Kim Sung-hwan (footballer) =

South Korean footballer

Personal information
- Date of birth: 15 December 1986 (age 39)
- Place of birth: Busan, South Korea
- Height: 1.84 m (6 ft 1/2 in)
- Positions: Defensive midfielder; defender

Team information
- Current team: Hwaseong

Youth career
- 2005–2008: Dong-A University

Senior career*
Years	Team	Apps	(Gls)
2009–2012	Seongnam FC	103	(8)
2013–2017	Ulsan Hyundai	87	(4)
2015–2016	→ Sangju Sangmu (army)	51	(16)
2018–2019	Port	29	(4)
2019	→ Suphanburi (loan)	22	(2)
2020	Liaoning Shenyang Urban	0	(0)
2020	Henan Jianye	3	(0)
2021–	Hwaseong	0	(0)
- * Club domestic league appearances and goals as of 14 September 2020 ‡ National team caps and goals as of 11 February 2013

- Kim Sung-hwan
- Hangul: 김성환
- Hanja: 金城煥
- RR: Gim Seonghwan
- MR: Kim Sŏnghwan

Kim Sung-hwan (Korean: 김성환; born 15 December 1986) is a South Korean football who plays as a defensive midfielder for K3 League side Hwaseong.

== Club career ==
Kim Sung-hwan would play college football at Dong-A University in Busan where he initially started as a forward before being converted into a defender and go on to sign his first contract in 2009 with top tier football club Seongnam FC. The Head coach Shin Tae-yong showed significant faith within Kim and immediately incorporated him as a significant part of the team's defence that ended the 2009 K League season as runners-up to Jeonbuk Hyundai Motors. Already an integral part of the team Kim would win his first piece of silverware when Seongnam won the 2010 AFC Champions League Final against Zob Ahan. This was followed with the 2011 Korean FA Cup, in a 1-0 victory against Suwon Samsung Bluewings.

The 2012 K-League season would see Seongnam struggle within the campaign and they finished in a disappointing twelfth within the league as well as flirting with relegation, which saw Shin Tae-yong leave the club and be replaced by An Ik-soo. The new manager allowed Kim to be transferred to another top tier club in Ulsan Hyundai. At his new club Kim immediately established himself as regular and guided the club to a runners-up position at the end of the 2013 K League Classic season. From 2015 to 2016 he played for Sangju Sangmu as part of his compulsory two-year military duty. With the club allowed to participate within the Korean football pyramid system, Kim was part of the side that won the 2015 K League Challenge and promotion to the top tier.

Kim would return to Ulsan where he would go on to win the 2017 Korean FA Cup against Busan IPark, however despite this he was allowed to leave the club on a free transfer to Thai football club Port F.C. for the start of the 2018 Thai League 1 season. The following season he joined another Thai club in Suphanburi on loan before joining Chinese football team Liaoning Shenyang Urban. Kim would join top tier Chinese club Henan Jianye and go on to make his debut in a league game against Dalian Professional F.C. on 3 September 2020 in a 4-0 defeat.

== Career statistics ==
As of 31 December 2020.

Appearances and goals by club, season and competition
Club	Season	League			National Cup		League Cup		Continental		Other		Total	
Club	Season	Division	Apps	Goals	Apps	Goals	Apps	Goals	Apps	Goals	Apps	Goals	Apps	Goals
Seongnam FC	2009	K League 1	29	4	5	0	4	0	-		-		38	4
Seongnam FC	2010	K League 1	29	1	3	0	3	0	10	0	3 (Note: Appearances in FIFA Club World Cup)	0	48	1
Seongnam FC	2011	K League 1	29	1	4	0	5	0	-		-		38	1
Seongnam FC	2012	K League 1	23	2	2	1	-		7	1	-		32	4
Seongnam FC	Total		110	8	14	1	12	0	17	1	3	0	156	5
Ulsan Hyundai	2013	K League 1	34	2	1	0	-		-		-		35	2
Ulsan Hyundai	2014	K League 1	28	1	1	0	-		3	0	-		32	1
Ulsan Hyundai	2016	K League 1	6	0	1	0	-		-		-		7	0
Ulsan Hyundai	2017	K League 1	19	1	4	0	-		3	1	-		26	2
Ulsan Hyundai	Total		87	4	7	0	0	0	6	1	0	0	100	5
Sangju Sangmu (army)	2015	K League 2	28	9	0	0	-		-		-		28	9
Sangju Sangmu (army)	2016	K League 1	23	7	0	0	-		-		-		23	7
Sangju Sangmu (army)	Total		51	16	0	0	0	0	0	0	0	0	51	16
Port	2018	Thai League 1	29	4	3	3	2	0	-		-		34	7
Suphanburi (loan)	2019	Thai League 1	22	2	1	0	0	0	-		-		23	2
Liaoning Shenyang Urban	2020	China League One	0	0	0	0	-		-		-		0	0
Henan Jianye	2020	Chinese Super League	3	0	0	0	-		-		-		3	0
Career total			302	34	25	4	14	0	23	2	3	0	367	40

== Honors ==
=== Club ===
Seongnam FC

- AFC Champions League: 2010
- Korean FA Cup: 2011

Sangju Sangmu

- K League 2: 2015

Ulsan Hyundai

- Korean FA Cup: 2017
