= Cho Dong-geon =

South Korean footballer (born 1986)

Cho Dong-geon 조동건
Personal information
- Full name: Cho Dong-geon
- Date of birth: April 16, 1986 (age 40)
- Place of birth: Iksan, Jeollabuk-do, South Korea
- Height: 1.80 m (5 ft 11 in)
- Position: Forward

Team information
- Current team: Hwaseong FC

Youth career
- 2005–2008: Konkuk University

Senior career*
Years	Team	Apps	(Gls)
2008–2011	Seongnam Ilhwa Chunma	88	(18)
2012–2016	Suwon Samsung Bluewings	73	(11)
2014–2015	→ Sangju Sangmu (army)	33	(9)
2017–2020	Sagan Tosu	57	(10)
2021–	Hwaseong	46	(14)

International career^{‡}
2007–2008	South Korea U-23		
2009–2013	South Korea	3	(0)
- * Club domestic league appearances and goals as of 23 October 2022 ‡ National team caps and goals as of 12 August 2009

Cho Dong-geon (Korean: 조동건; Hanja: 趙東建, Korean pronunciation: [tɕo doŋgʌn]; born 2 February 1986) is a South Korean professional footballer who plays as a striker for Hwaseong of the K3 League.

On 12 August 2009, he played his first senior match against Paraguay.

== Career ==
In December 2020, Cho departed Sagan Tosu after four seasons.

== Club career statistics ==
As of 19 October 2022.

Appearances and goals by club, season and competition
Club	Season	League			Cup		League Cup		Asia		Other		Total	
Club	Season	Division	Apps	Goals	Apps	Goals	Apps	Goals	Apps	Goals	Apps	Goals	Apps	Goals
Seongnam	2008	K League	11	4	0	0	1	0	—		—		12	4
Seongnam	2009	K League	32	6	5	1	7	2	—		—		44	9
Seongnam	2010	K League	18	2	2	0	0	0	5	1	3	1	28	4
Seongnam	2011	K League	27	7	5	3	5	1	—		—		37	11
Seongnam	Total		88	19	12	4	13	2	5	1	3	1	129	30
Suwon Samsung Bluewings	2012	K-League	20	2	1	0	—		—		—		21	2
Suwon Samsung Bluewings	2013	K League Classic	25	5	0	0	—		2	0	—		27	5
Suwon Samsung Bluewings	2014	K League Classic	4	0	0	0	—		—		—		4	0
Suwon Samsung Bluewings	2016	K League Classic	24	4	5	0	—		0	0	—		29	4
Suwon Samsung Bluewings	Total		73	11	6	0	0	0	2	0	0	0	81	11
Sangju Sangmu (army)	2014	K League Classic	19	3	2	0	—		—		—		21	3
Sangju Sangmu (army)	2015	K League Challenge	14	6	0	0	—		—		—		14	6
Sangju Sangmu (army)	Total		33	9	2	0	0	0	0	0	0	0	35	9
Sagan Tosu	2017	J1 League	17	5	0	0	3	0	—		—		20	5
Sagan Tosu	2018	J1 League	16	2	1	0	3	0	—		—		20	2
Sagan Tosu	2019	J1 League	10	0	2	0	5	1	—		—		17	1
Sagan Tosu	2020	J1 League	14	3	—		0	0	—		—		14	3
Sagan Tosu	Total		57	10	3	0	11	1	0	0	0	0	71	11
Hwaseong FC	2021	K3 League	20	10	1	1	—		—		—		21	11
Hwaseong FC	2022	K3 League	26	4	3	2	—		—		—		29	6
Hwaseong FC	Total		46	14	4	3	0	0	0	0	0	0	50	17
Career totals			297	63	27	7	24	4	7	1	0	0	355	75

== Honors ==
Seongnam Ilhwa Chunma

- AFC Champions League: 2010
- Korean FA Cup: 2011
