= 2010 Jeju United FC season =

Jeju United FC
2010 season
- Chairman: Shin Heon-Cheol
- Manager: Park Kyung-Hoon
- K-League: Runners-up
- Korean FA Cup: Semi-finals
- League Cup: Quarter-finals
- Top goalscorer: League: Kim Eun-Jung (13); All: Kim Eun-Jung (20)
- Highest home attendance: 18,528 vs Seoul (1 December)
- Lowest home attendance: 578 vs Gwangju (26 May)
- Average home league attendance: 5,546
Home colours	Away colours

The 2010 season was Jeju United FC's twenty-eighth season in the K-League in South Korea. Jeju United FC is competing in K-League, League Cup and Korean FA Cup.

== Current squad ==
Note: Flags indicate national team as defined under FIFA eligibility rules; some limited exceptions apply. Players may hold more than one non-FIFA nationality.

No.	Pos.	Nation	Player
1	GK	KOR	Jeon Tae-Hyun
2	DF	KOR	Lee Sang-Ho
3	DF	KOR	Kang Min-hyuk
5	MF	KOR	Park Hyun-Beom
6	DF	KOR	Cho Won-Kwang
7	MF	KOR	Koo Ja-Cheol
8	MF	KOR	Oh Seung-Bum
9	FW	BRA	Gomes
10	FW	BRA	Danilo Neco
11	FW	KOR	Bae Ki-Jong
13	DF	KOR	Ma Chul-Jun
14	MF	KOR	Choi Sung-Hyun
15	DF	KOR	Hong Jung-Ho
16	MF	KOR	Kim Young-Sin
17	FW	KOR	Lee Sang-Hyup
18	FW	KOR	Kim Eun-Jung
19	DF	KOR	Kim Myung-Hwan
20	DF	KOR	Ku Kyung-Hyen
21	GK	KOR	Han Dong-Jin

No.	Pos.	Nation	Player
22	FW	KOR	Lee Hyun-Ho
23	GK	KOR	Kim Ho-Jun
25	DF	KOR	Kang Joon-Woo
26	DF	KOR	Yoon Won-Il
27	DF	KOR	Lee In-Sik
28	DF	KOR	Kim In-Ho
29	FW	KOR	Yang Se-Keun
31	GK	KOR	Lee Jin-Hyung
32	FW	KOR	Han Jae-Man
33	FW	KOR	Kim Joon-Yeop
34	MF	KOR	Kang In-Joon
35	MF	KOR	Kwon Hyung-Seon
36	MF	KOR	Seo Sang-Hoon
37	FW	KOR	Shim Young-Sung
38	FW	KOR	Kim Bon-Kwang
39	FW	BRA	Santos
44	MF	KOR	Oh Bong-Jin
88	FW	CHN	Yan Song

== K-League ==
Date	Opponents	H / A	Result F – A	Scorers	Attendance	League position
27 February	Busan I'Park	A	1 – 0	Lee Sang-Hyup 53'	3,103	5th
6 March	Jeonbuk Hyundai Motors	H	2 – 2	Own goal 7', Park Hyun-Beom 61'	5,842	5th
14 March	Gyeongnam FC	A	1 – 1	Lee Sang-Hyup 63'	11,982	5th
21 March	Daejeon Citizen	H	2 – 0	Lee Sang-Hyup 18', Park Hyun-Beom 22'	2,158	2nd
28 March	Gwangju Sangmu FC	A	0 – 0		2,532	3rd
4 April	Seongnam Ilhwa Chunma	H	1 – 1	Kim Eun-Jung 15'	2,931	5th
10 April	Ulsan Hyundai FC	A	0 – 1		5,661	6th
18 April	Suwon Samsung Bluewings	H	2 – 1	Bae Ki-Jong 54', Kim Eun-Jung 82'	2,168	5th
25 April	Chunnam Dragons	H	2 – 1	Lee Hyun-Ho 50', Lee Sang-Hyup 90'	2,020	4th
5 May	Daegu FC	H	1 – 0	Gu Ja-Cheol 60'	4,561	4th
8 May	Pohang Steelers	A	5 – 2	Lee Sang-Hyup 13', Gu Ja-Cheol 18', 89', Kim Eun-Jung 74', Santos 86'	7,463	2nd
17 July	Gangwon FC	H	5 – 0	Kim Eun-Jung 12', Gu Ja-Cheol 24', Santos 55', 57', Hong Jeong-Ho 65'	3,314	1st
24 July	Incheon United FC	A	3 – 2	Kim Eun-Jung 27', 90+3', Santos 83'	7,217	1st
31 July	FC Seoul	A	0 – 2		23,521	3rd
7 August	Gwangju Sangmu FC	H	4 – 0	Oh Seung-Bum 14', Danilo Neco 17', Santos 41', Kim Eun-Jung 48'	4,155	1st
14 August	Chunnam Dragons	A	2 – 4	Santos 43', Kim Young-Sin 63'	11,937	2nd
21 August	Busan I'Park	H	1 – 0	Lee Hyun-Ho 66'	4,734	2nd
28 August	Daejeon Citizen	A	3 – 1	Lee Hyun-Ho 60', Santos 65', Danilo Neco 82'	8,453	1st
4 September	Ulsan Hyundai FC	H	2 – 1	Gu Ja-Cheol 73', Bae Ki-Jong 85'	2,383	1st
11 September	Suwon Samsung Bluewings	A	3 – 0	Bae Ki-Jong 38', 54', Kim Eun-Jung 90'	25,031	1st
18 September	Seongnam Ilhwa Chunma	A	1 – 0	Danilo Neco 73'	5,686	1st
26 September	Pohang Steelers	H	1 – 1	Park Hyun-Beom 67'	14,754	1st
3 October	Gyeongnam FC	H	3 – 2	Kim Eun-Jung 21'(pen), 56', Santos 31'	13,594	1st
9 October	Gangwon FC	A	4 – 1	Kim Eun-Jung 4'(pen), 46', Santos 8', Danilo Neco 23'	7,527	1st
16 October	Jeonbuk Hyundai Motors	A	1 – 1	Gomes 76'	10,854	1st
27 October	FC Seoul	H	1 – 1	Danilo Neco 70'	6,792	1st
31 October	Daegu FC	A	3 – 0	Lee Hyun-Ho 26', Kim Eun-Jung 28', Santos 90+1'	3,713	1st
7 November	Incheon United	H	0 – 0		6,245	2nd

Pos	Team	Pld	W	D	L	GF	GA	GD	Pts	Qualification
1	FC Seoul	28	20	2	6	58	26	+32	62	Qualification for the playoffs final
2	Jeju United	28	17	8	3	54	25	+29	59	Qualification for the playoffs semi-final
3	Jeonbuk Hyundai Motors	28	15	6	7	54	36	+18	51	Qualification for the playoffs first round
4	Ulsan Hyundai	28	15	5	8	47	30	+17	50	Qualification for the playoffs first round
5	Seongnam Ilhwa Chunma	28	13	9	6	46	26	+20	48	Qualification for the playoffs first round

Source: K League (in Korean)
Rules for classification: 1) Points; 2) Goal difference; 3) Goals scored

Pos	Team	Qualification
1	FC Seoul (C)	Qualification for the Champions League
2	Jeju United	Qualification for the Champions League
3	Jeonbuk Hyundai Motors	Qualification for the Champions League
4	Seongnam Ilhwa Chunma	
5	Ulsan Hyundai	
6	Gyeongnam FC	

Source: RSSSF
(C) Champions

=== Championship ===
Date	Round	Opponents	H / A	Result F – A	Scorers	Attendance
28 November	Semifinal	Jeonbuk Hyundai Motors	H	1 – 0	Danilo Neco 75'	7,532
1 December	Final 1st leg	FC Seoul	H	2 – 2	Bae Ki-Jong 26', Santos 51'	18,528
5 December	Final 2nd leg	FC Seoul	A	1 – 2	Santos 25'	56,759

== Korean FA Cup ==
Date	Round	Opponents	H / A	Result F – A	Scorers	Attendance
21 April	Round of 32	Busan Transportation Corp.	A	3 – 1	Leo 17', Santos 48', 73'	300
21 July	Round of 16	Ulsan Hyundai FC	H	1 – 0	Kim Eun-Jung 87'	1,738
18 August	Quarterfinal	Seongnam Ilhwa Chunma	A	2 – 0	Kim Eun-Jung 20', 89'	1,214
29 September	Semifinal	Suwon Samsung Bluewings	A	0 – 0 (AET, 2–4p)		

== League Cup ==
=== Group stage ===
Date	Opponents	H / A	Result F – A	Scorers	Attendance	Group position
26 May	Gwangju Sangmu FC	H	2 – 0	Kim Eun-Jung 17', Santos 68'	578	2nd
29 May	Seongnam Ilhwa Chunma	A	1 – 1	Santos 90'	3,002	2nd
2 June	Ulsan Hyundai FC	H	3 – 1	Kim Eun-Jung 6', 39', Kim Young-Sin 61'	1,351	1st
6 June	FC Seoul	A	1 – 5	Lee Sang-Hyup 72'	18,703	2nd

Pos	Team	Pld	W	D	L	GF	GA	GD	Pts	SEO	JJU	USH	SIC	GWJ
1	FC Seoul	4	2	2	0	8	2	+6	8	—	5–1	—	2–0	—
2	Jeju United	4	2	1	1	7	7	0	7	—	—	3–1	—	2–0
3	Ulsan Hyundai	4	1	2	1	7	7	0	5	1–1	—	—	—	2–0
4	Seongnam Ilhwa Chunma	4	0	3	1	5	7	−2	3	—	1–1	3–3	—	—
5	Gwangju Sangmu	4	0	2	2	1	5	−4	2	0–0	—	—	1–1	—

Source: RSSSF

=== Knockout stage ===
Date	Round	Opponents	H / A	Result F – A	Scorers	Attendance
14 July	Quarterfinal	Gyeongnam FC	A	1 – 1 (AET, 3–4p)	Kim Eun-Jung 29'	5,106

== Squad statistics ==
=== Appearances and goals ===
Statistics accurate as of match played 5 December 2010

No.	Nat.	Pos.	Name	League		FA Cup		League Cup		Appearances		Goals
No.	Nat.	Pos.	Name	Apps	Goals	Apps	Goals	Apps	Goals	App (sub)	Total	Goals
1	(South Korea)	GK	Jeon Tae-Hyun	0	0	0	0	0	0	0	0	0
2	(South Korea)	DF	Lee Sang-Ho	28	0	4	0	4 (1)	0	36 (1)	37	0
3	(South Korea)	DF	Kang Min-hyuk	21 (3)	0	3	0	5	0	29 (3)	32	0
5	(South Korea)	MF	Park Hyun-Beom	19 (3)	3	3	0	3 (1)	0	25 (4)	29	3
6	(South Korea)	DF	Cho Won-Kwang	0	0	0	0	0	0	0	0	0
7	(South Korea)	MF	Gu Ja-Cheol	28 (1)	5	4	0	1	0	33 (1)	34	5
8	(South Korea)	MF	Oh Seung-Bum	14 (13)	1	1 (2)	0	4 (1)	0	19 (16)	35	1
9	(Brazil)	FW	Gomes	1 (5)	1	0	0	0	0	1 (5)	6	1
10	(Brazil)	FW	Danilo Neco	12 (17)	6	1 (3)	0	1 (2)	0	14 (22)	36	6
11	(South Korea)	FW	Bae Ki-Jong	20 (1)	5	2 (1)	0	3	0	25 (2)	27	5
13	(South Korea)	DF	Ma Chul-Jun	22 (3)	0	3	0	4	0	29 (3)	32	0
14	(South Korea)	MF	Choi Sung-Hyun	0 (1)	0	0 (1)	0	0	0	0 (2)	2	0
15	(South Korea)	DF	Hong Jeong-Ho	16	1	3	0	4 (1)	0	23 (1)	24	1
16	(South Korea)	MF	Kim Young-Sin	20 (7)	1	3	0	2 (3)	1	25 (10)	35	2
17	(South Korea)	FW	Lee Sang-Hyup	6 (8)	5	0 (2)	0	1 (2)	1	7 (12)	19	6
18	(South Korea)	FW	Kim Eun-Jung	29 (1)	13	3 (1)	3	4	4	36 (2)	38	20
19	(South Korea)	DF	Kim Myung-Hwan	5 (2)	0	1 (1)	0	1	0	7 (3)	10	0
20	(South Korea)	DF	Ku Kyung-Hyen	6 (1)	0	0	0	1 (1)	0	7 (2)	9	0
21	(South Korea)	GK	Han Dong-Jin	0	0	1	0	1	0	2 (0)	2	0
22	(South Korea)	FW	Lee Hyun-Ho	14 (12)	4	2 (1)	0	4 (1)	0	20 (14)	34	4
23	(South Korea)	GK	Kim Ho-Jun	31	0	3	0	4	0	38 (0)	38	0
25	(South Korea)	DF	Kang Joon-Woo	4	0	0	0	0	0	4 (0)	4	0
26	(South Korea)	DF	Yoon Won-Il	0	0	0	0	0	0	0	0	0
27	(South Korea)	DF	Lee In-Sik	0 (3)	0	0	0	0	0	0 (3)	3	0
28	(South Korea)	DF	Kim In-Ho	8 (2)	0	1	0	0	0	9 (2)	11	0
29	(South Korea)	FW	Yang Se-Keun	0 (3)	0	0	0	0	0	0 (3)	3	0
31	(South Korea)	GK	Lee Jin-Hyung	0	0	0	0	0	0	0	0	0
32	(South Korea)	FW	Han Jae-Man	0 (3)	0	0	0	1 (3)	0	1 (6)	7	0
33	(South Korea)	FW	Kim Joon-Yeop	0	0	0	0	1	0	1 (0)	1	0
34	(South Korea)	MF	Kang In-Joon	0	0	0	0	0	0	0	0	0
35	(South Korea)	MF	Kwon Hyung-Seon	0	0	0	0	1	0	1 (0)	1	0
36	(South Korea)	MF	Seo Sang-Hoon	0	0	0	0	0	0	0	0	0
37	(South Korea)	FW	Shim Young-Sung	0	0	0	0	0	0	0	0	0
38	(South Korea)	FW	Kim Bon-Kwang	0	0	0	0	0	0	0	0	0
39	(Brazil)	FW	Santos	23 (1)	12	3 (1)	2	4	2	30 (2)	32	16
44	(South Korea)	MF	Oh Bong-Jin	0	0	0	0	0	0	0	0	0
88	(China)	FW	Yan Song	0	0	1	0	0	0	1 (0)	1	0
4	(South Korea)	DF	Cho Yong-Hyung (out)	13 (1)	0	1	0	1	0	15 (1)	16	0
9	(Brazil)	FW	Leo (out)	0 (2)	0	1	1	0	0	1 (2)	3	1

=== Top scorers ===
Position	Nation	Number	Name	K-League	KFA Cup	League Cup	Total
1	(South Korea)	18	Kim Eun-Jung	13	3	4	20
2	(Brazil)	39	Santos	12	2	2	16
3	(Brazil)	10	Danilo Neco	6	0	0	6
=	(South Korea)	17	Lee Sang-Hyup	5	0	1	6
4	(South Korea)	7	Gu Ja-Cheol	5	0	0	5
=	(South Korea)	11	Bae Ki-Jong	5	0	0	5
5	(South Korea)	22	Lee Hyun-Ho	4	0	0	4
6	(South Korea)	5	Park Hyun-Beom	3	0	0	3
7	(South Korea)	16	Kim Young-Sin	1	0	1	2
8	(South Korea)	8	Oh Seung-Bum	1	0	0	1
=	(Brazil)	9	Gomes	1	0	0	1
=	(South Korea)	15	Hong Jeong-Ho	1	0	0	1
=	(Brazil)	9	Leo	0	1	0	1
/	/	/	Own Goals	1	0	0	1
			TOTALS	58	6	8	72

=== Discipline ===
Position	Nation	Number	Name	K-League		KFA Cup		League Cup		Total	
Position	Nation	Number	Name	Booked	Sent off (straight red)	Booked	Sent off (straight red)	Booked	Sent off (straight red)	Booked	Sent off (straight red)
DF	(South Korea)	2	Lee Sang-Ho	3	1	1	0	1	0	5	1
DF	(South Korea)	3	Kang Min-hyuk	2	0	0	0	0	0	2	0
DF	(South Korea)	4	Cho Yong-Hyung	1	0	0	0	0	0	1	0
MF	(South Korea)	5	Park Hyun-Beom	3	0	0	0	0	1	3	1
MF	(South Korea)	7	Gu Ja-Cheol	4	0	0	0	1	0	5	0
MF	(South Korea)	8	Oh Seung-Bum	5	0	0	0	1	0	6	0
FW	(Brazil)	9	Leo	0	0	1	0	0	0	1	0
FW	(Brazil)	10	Danilo Neco	2	0	0	0	0	0	2	0
FW	(South Korea)	11	Bae Ki-Jong	1	0	0	0	0	0	1	0
DF	(South Korea)	13	Ma Chul-Jun	8	0	0	0	1	0	9	0
DF	(South Korea)	15	Hong Jeong-Ho	2	0	0	0	1	0	3	0
MF	(South Korea)	16	Kim Young-Sin	2	0	0	0	0	0	2	0
FW	(South Korea)	17	Lee Sang-Hyup	4	1	1	0	0	0	5	1
FW	(South Korea)	18	Kim Eun-Jung	4	0	0	0	0	0	4	0
FW	(South Korea)	22	Lee Hyun-Ho	1	0	0	0	0	0	1	0
GK	(South Korea)	23	Kim Ho-Jun	1	0	0	0	1	0	2	0
DF	(South Korea)	25	Kang Joon-Woo	1	0	0	0	0	0	1	0
DF	(South Korea)	28	Kim In-Ho	2	0	0	0	0	0	2	0
/	/	/	TOTALS	46	2	3	0	6	1	55	3
