= 2010 K League Championship =

Tournament details
- Host country: South Korea
- Dates: 20 November – 5 December 2010
- Teams: 6

Final positions
- Champions: FC Seoul
- Runners-up: Jeju United

Tournament statistics
- Matches played: 6
- Goals scored: 15 (2.5 per match)
- Attendance: 134,410 (22,402 per match)
- Top scorer(s): Cho Sung-hwan; Santos Júnior (2 goals each)

The 2010 K League Championship was the 14th competition of the K League Championship, and was held to decide the 28th champions of the K League. The top six clubs of the regular season qualified for the championship. The winners of the regular season directly qualified for the final, and second place team qualified for the semi-final. The other four clubs entered the first round, and the winners of the second round advanced to the semi-final. Each match was played as a single match, excluding the final which consisted of two matches.

== Qualified teams ==
Pos	Team	Pld	W	D	L	GF	GA	GD	Pts	Qualification
1	FC Seoul	28	20	2	6	58	26	+32	62	Qualification for the playoffs final
2	Jeju United	28	17	8	3	54	25	+29	59	Qualification for the playoffs semi-final
3	Jeonbuk Hyundai Motors	28	15	6	7	54	36	+18	51	Qualification for the playoffs first round
4	Ulsan Hyundai	28	15	5	8	47	30	+17	50	Qualification for the playoffs first round
5	Seongnam Ilhwa Chunma	28	13	9	6	46	26	+20	48	Qualification for the playoffs first round
6	Gyeongnam FC	28	13	9	6	41	32	+9	48	Qualification for the playoffs first round

Source: K League (in Korean)
Rules for classification: 1) Points; 2) Goal difference; 3) Goals scored

== Bracket ==
First round
3	Jeonbuk Hyundai Motors	2
6	Gyeongnam FC	0
4	Ulsan Hyundai	1
5	Seongnam Ilhwa Chunma	3

Second round
Jeonbuk Hyundai Motors	1
Seongnam Ilhwa Chunma	0

Semifinal
2	Jeju United	1
Jeonbuk Hyundai Motors	0

Final
1	FC Seoul	2	2	4
Jeju United	2	1	3

== First round ==
=== Jeonbuk vs Gyeongnam ===
20 November 2010
15:00 KST

Jeonbuk Hyundai Motors	2–0	Gyeongnam FC
Cho Sung-hwan 10'; Eninho 70'	Report

Jeonju World Cup Stadium, Jeonju
Attendance: 18,525
Referee: Lee Jong-gook (South Korea)

Jeonbuk Hyundai Motors	Gyeongnam FC

GK	1	(South Korea) Kwon Sun-tae
RB	2	(South Korea) Choi Chul-soon
CB	9	(South Korea) Sim Woo-yeon
CB	16	(South Korea) Cho Sung-hwan
LB	33	(South Korea) Park Won-jae		(substituted off) 86'
CM	5	(South Korea) Son Seung-joon	(yellow card) 66'
CM	13	(South Korea) Jung Hoon	(yellow card) 43'
RM	8	(Brazil) Eninho	(yellow card) 51'
AM	19	(Brazil) Luiz Henrique		(substituted off) 56'
LM	27	(South Korea) Kim Ji-woong	(yellow card) 64'	(substituted off) 68'
CF	20	(South Korea) Lee Dong-gook
Substitutions:
GK	21	(South Korea) Kim Min-sik
DF	15	(China) Feng Xiaoting
MF	4	(South Korea) Kim Sang-sik
MF	6	(South Korea) Jin Kyung-sun		(substituted on) 86'
MF	23	(South Korea) Lim Sang-hyub
MF	24	(South Korea) Kang Seung-jo		(substituted on) 68'
FW	19	(Croatia) Krunoslav Lovrek		(substituted on) 56'
Manager:
(South Korea) Choi Kang-hee

GK	1	(South Korea) Kim Byung-ji
CB	38	(South Korea) Lee Yong-gi		(substituted off) 76'
CB	28	(South Korea) Jeon Jun-hyung
CB	17	(South Korea) Lee Ji-nam
RM	5	(South Korea) Kim Tae-wook
CM	9	(South Korea) Lee Yong-rae
CM	33	(South Korea) An Sang-hyun	(yellow card) 45+1'
LM	24	(South Korea) Kim Young-woo
RW	22	(South Korea) Seo Sang-min		(substituted off) 55'
LW	11	(Brazil) Camilo Sanvezzo		(substituted off) 55*'
CF	10	(Brazil) Lúcio Curió	(yellow card) 75'
Substitutions:
GK	21	(South Korea) Lee Jung-rae
DF	29	(South Korea) Lee Hea-kang
DF	44	(South Korea) Lee Jae-myung
MF	6	(South Korea) Kim In-han		(substituted on) 55*'
MF	30	(South Korea) Kim Jin-Hyun		(substituted on) 55'
FW	26	(South Korea) Lee Hun		(substituted on) 76'
FW	42	(South Korea) Choi Won-woo
Manager:
(South Korea) Kim Gwi-hwa

Man of the match:
Eninho (Jeonbuk Hyundai Motors)

Assistant referees:
Kim Yong-soo (South Korea)
Son Jae-sun (South Korea)
Fourth official:
Ahn Yong-hee (South Korea)

=== Ulsan vs Seongnam ===
21 November 2010
15:00 KST

Ulsan Hyundai	1–3	Seongnam Ilhwa Chunma
Ko Chang-hyun 23'	Report	Ognenovski 27' (pen.); Radončić 66'; Molina 71'

Ulsan Munsu Football Stadium, Ulsan
Attendance: 25,090
Referee: Lee Sam-ho (South Korea)

Ulsan Hyundai	Seongnam Ilhwa Chunma

GK	1	(South Korea) Kim Young-kwang
RB	2	(South Korea) Lee Yong
CB	5	(South Korea) Yoo Kyoung-youl
CB	22	(South Korea) Kim Chi-gon	(yellow card) 35'	(substituted off) 44'
LB	3	(South Korea) Kim Dong-jin
RM	8	(Colombia) Julián Estiven Vélez		(substituted off) 67'
CM	17	(South Korea) Go Seul-ki
LM	16	(South Korea) Oh Jang-eun
RW	15	(South Korea) Kim Shin-wook
LW	13	(South Korea) Ko Chang-hyun
CF	9	(Paraguay) José Ortigoza		(substituted off) 86'
Substitutions:
GK	31	(South Korea) Choi Moo-lim
DF	24	(South Korea) Choi Jae-soo
DF	45	(South Korea) Lee Jae-sung		(substituted on) 44'
DF	50	(South Korea) Park Byung-gyu
MF	6	(South Korea) Kang Jin-wook
FW	10	(Colombia) Carmelo Valencia		(substituted on) 67'
FW	11	(South Korea) No Byung-jun		(substituted on) 86'
Manager:
(South Korea) Kim Ho-kon

GK	1	(South Korea) Jung Sung-ryong
RB	24	(South Korea) Kim Tae-yoon
CB	5	(South Korea) Cho Byung-kuk
CB	4	(Australia) Sasa Ognenovski		(substituted off) 85'
LB	6	(South Korea) Jeon Kwang-jin	(yellow card) 90+1'
CM	16	(South Korea) Kim Sung-hwan	(yellow card) 24'
CM	17	(South Korea) Kim Cheol-ho		(substituted off) 65'
RM	11	(Colombia) Mauricio Molina
AM	8	(South Korea) Choi Sung-kuk	(yellow card) 7'
LM	9	(South Korea) Cho Dong-geon		(substituted off) 85*'
CF	10	(Montenegro) Dženan Radončić
Substitutions:
GK	41	(South Korea) Kang Sung-kwan
DF	2	(South Korea) Ko Jae-sung		(substituted on) 85'
DF	3	(South Korea) Yun Young-sun
MF	30	(South Korea) Jo Jae-cheol		(substituted on) 65'
FW	14	(South Korea) Song Ho-young		(substituted on) 85*'
FW	18	(South Korea) Namgung Do
FW	20	(South Korea) Kim Jin-yong
Manager:
(South Korea) Shin Tae-yong

Man of the match:
Dženan Radončić (Seongnam Ilhwa Chunma)

Assistant referees:
Won Chang-ho (South Korea)
Jung Hae-sang (South Korea)
Fourth official:
Ko Keum-bok (South Korea)

== Second round ==
24 November 2010
19:00 KST

Jeonbuk Hyundai Motors	1–0	Seongnam Ilhwa Chunma
Cho Sung-hwan 22'	Report

Jeonju World Cup Stadium, Jeonju
Attendance: 7,976
Referee: Choi Myung-yong (South Korea)

Jeonbuk Hyundai Motors	Seongnam Ilhwa Chunma

GK	1	(South Korea) Kwon Sun-tae
RB	2	(South Korea) Choi Chul-soon
CB	9	(South Korea) Sim Woo-yeon	(yellow card) 75'
CB	16	(South Korea) Cho Sung-hwan	(yellow card) 16'
LB	33	(South Korea) Park Won-jae		(substituted off) 46'
CM	6	(South Korea) Jin Kyung-sun
CM	13	(South Korea) Jung Hoon	(yellow card) 58'
RM	8	(Brazil) Eninho
AM	19	(Brazil) Luiz Henrique	(yellow card) 13'
LM	27	(South Korea) Kim Ji-woong		(substituted off) 72'
CF	20	(South Korea) Lee Dong-gook		(substituted off) 82'
Substitutions:
GK	21	(South Korea) Kim Min-sik
DF	5	(South Korea) Son Seung-joon		(substituted on) 46'
DF	14	(South Korea) Lee Yo-han
DF	15	(China) Feng Xiaoting
MF	23	(South Korea) Lim Sang-hyub
MF	24	(South Korea) Kang Seung-jo		(substituted on) 72'
FW	19	(Croatia) Krunoslav Lovrek		(substituted on) 82'
Manager:
(South Korea) Choi Kang-hee

GK	1	(South Korea) Jung Sung-ryong	(yellow card) 86'
RB	2	(South Korea) Ko Jae-Sung	(yellow card) 72'
CB	24	(South Korea) Kim Tae-yoon
CB	5	(South Korea) Cho Byung-kuk
LB	6	(South Korea) Jeon Kwang-jin	(yellow card) 90+2'
CM	16	(South Korea) Kim Sung-hwan
CM	17	(South Korea) Kim Cheol-ho		(substituted off) 33'
RM	11	(Colombia) Mauricio Molina
AM	8	(South Korea) Choi Sung-kuk		(substituted off) 67'
LM	9	(South Korea) Cho Dong-geon		(substituted off) 81'
CF	10	(Montenegro) Dženan Radončić
Substitutions:
GK	41	(South Korea) Kang Sung-kwan
DF	3	(South Korea) Yun Young-sun
DF	38	(South Korea) Yong Hyun-jin
MF	30	(South Korea) Jo Jae-cheol		(substituted on) 33'
FW	14	(South Korea) Song Ho-young		(substituted on) 81'
FW	18	(South Korea) Namgung Do
FW	20	(South Korea) Kim Jin-yong		(substituted on) 67'
Manager:
(South Korea) Shin Tae-yong

Man of the match:
Cho Sung-hwan (Jeonbuk Hyundai Motors)

Assistant referees:
Kim Sun-jin (South Korea)
Kang Yi-sung (South Korea)
Fourth official:
Ko Keum-bok (South Korea)

== Semi-final ==
28 November 2010
14:00 KST

Jeju United	1–0	Jeonbuk Hyundai Motors
Danilo Neco 75'	Report

Jeju World Cup Stadium, Seogwipo
Attendance: 7,532
Referee: Choi Kwang-bo (South Korea)

Jeju United	Jeonbuk Hyundai Motors

GK	23	(South Korea) Kim Ho-jun
RB	2	(South Korea) Lee Sang-ho
CB	15	(South Korea) Hong Jeong-ho
CB	3	(South Korea) Kang Min-hyuk
LB	13	(South Korea) Ma Chul-jun	(yellow card) 43'
CM	5	(South Korea) Park Hyun-beom
CM	7	(South Korea) Koo Ja-cheol	(yellow card) 71'
RM	11	(South Korea) Bae Ki-jong		(substituted off) 74'
AM	39	(Brazil) Santos Júnior		(substituted off) 83'
LM	22	(South Korea) Lee Hyun-ho		(substituted off) 43'
CF	18	(South Korea) Kim Eun-jung
Substitutions:
GK	21	(South Korea) Han Dong-jin
DF	25	(South Korea) Kang Joon-woo
DF	45	(South Korea) Park Jin-ok
MF	8	(South Korea) Oh Seung-bum		(substituted on) 83'
MF	16	(South Korea) Kim Young-sin		(substituted on) 74'
FW	10	(Brazil) Danilo Neco		(substituted on) 43'
FW	29	(South Korea) Yang Se-keun
Manager:
(South Korea) Park Kyung-hoon

GK	1	(South Korea) Kwon Sun-tae
RB	2	(South Korea) Choi Chul-soon
CB	9	(South Korea) Sim Woo-yeon
CB	16	(South Korea) Cho Sung-hwan	(yellow card) 72'
LB	25	(South Korea) Jeon Kwang-hwan
CM	5	(South Korea) Son Seung-joon	(yellow card) 9'	(substituted off) 78'
CM	6	(South Korea) Jin Kyung-sun	(yellow card) 45'
RM	8	(Brazil) Eninho
AM	19	(Brazil) Luiz Henrique
LM	27	(South Korea) Kim Ji-woong		(substituted off) 51'
CF	20	(South Korea) Lee Dong-gook	(yellow card) 71'
Substitutions:
GK	21	(South Korea) Kim Min-sik
DF	3	(South Korea) Sung Jong-hyun
DF	14	(South Korea) Lee Yo-han
DF	15	(China) Feng Xiaoting
MF	24	(South Korea) Kang Seung-jo
MF	26	(South Korea) Seo Jung-jin		(substituted on) 51'
FW	19	(Croatia) Krunoslav Lovrek		(substituted on) 78'
Manager:
(South Korea) Choi Kang-hee

Man of the match:
Danilo Neco (Jeju United)

Assistant referees:
Kim Jung-sik (South Korea)
Son Jae-sun (South Korea)
Fourth official:
Lee Sam-ho (South Korea)

== Final ==
=== First leg ===
1 December 2010
19:00 KST

Jeju United	2–2	FC Seoul
Bae Ki-jong 26'; Santos Júnior 51'	Report	Damjanović 58'; Kim Chi-woo 90+2'

Jeju World Cup Stadium, Seogwipo
Attendance: 18,528
Referee: Lee Sang-yong (South Korea)

Jeju United	FC Seoul

GK	23	(South Korea) Kim Ho-jun
RB	2	(South Korea) Lee Sang-ho
CB	15	(South Korea) Hong Jeong-ho
CB	3	(South Korea) Kang Min-hyuk
LB	13	(South Korea) Ma Chul-jun
CM	5	(South Korea) Park Hyun-beom
CM	7	(South Korea) Koo Ja-cheol
RM	11	(South Korea) Bae Ki-jong	(yellow card) 27'	(substituted off) 70'
AM	39	(Brazil) Santos Júnior		(substituted off) 78'
LM	10	(Brazil) Danilo Neco		(substituted off) 85'
CF	18	(South Korea) Kim Eun-jung
Substitutions:
GK	21	(South Korea) Han Dong-jin
DF	25	(South Korea) Kang Joon-woo
MF	8	(South Korea) Oh Seung-bum		(substituted on) 85'
MF	16	(South Korea) Kim Young-sin		(substituted on) 70'
MF	22	(South Korea) Lee Hyun-ho		(substituted on) 78'
MF	46	(South Korea) Kim Tae-min
FW	29	(South Korea) Yang Se-keun
Manager:
(South Korea) Park Kyung-hoon

GK	1	(South Korea) Kim Yong-dae
RB	2	(South Korea) Choi Hyo-jin	(yellow card) 54'
CB	6	(South Korea) Kim Jin-kyu
CB	36	(South Korea) Kim Dong-woo		(substituted off) 55'
LB	13	(South Korea) Hyun Young-min
RM	33	(South Korea) Choi Tae-uk
CM	8	(Brazil) Adilson		(substituted off) 71'
CM	16	(South Korea) Ha Dae-sung
LM	28	(South Korea) Lee Seung-yeoul	(yellow card) 16'	(substituted off) 55*'
SS	88	(Uzbekistan) Server Djeparov
CF	10	(Montenegro) Dejan Damjanović
Substitutions:
GK	34	(South Korea) Jo Su-huk
DF	15	(South Korea) Park Yong-ho		(substituted on) 71'
MF	7	(South Korea) Kim Chi-woo		(substituted on) 55*'
MF	14	(South Korea) Kim Han-yoon
MF	35	(South Korea) Choi Hyun-tae
MF	39	(South Korea) Kim Tae-hwan
FW	9	(South Korea) Jung Jo-gook		(substituted on) 55'
Manager:
(Portugal) Nelo Vingada

Man of the match:
Santos Júnior (Jeju United)

Assistant referees:
Kim Seon-jin (South Korea)
Kim Kye-soo (South Korea)
Fourth official:
Lee Sam-ho (South Korea)

=== Second leg ===
5 December 2010
14:00 KST

FC Seoul	2–1	Jeju United
Jung Jo-gook 27' (pen.); Adilson 72'	Report	Santos Júnior 25'

Seoul World Cup Stadium, Seoul
Attendance: 56,759
Referee: Choi Kwang-bo (South Korea)

FC Seoul	Jeju United

GK	1	(South Korea) Kim Yong-dae
RB	2	(South Korea) Choi Hyo-jin
CB	6	(South Korea) Kim Jin-kyu
CB	8	(Brazil) Adilson
LB	13	(South Korea) Hyun Young-min
RM	33	(South Korea) Choi Tae-uk		(substituted off) 81'
CM	16	(South Korea) Ha Dae-sung
CM	88	(Uzbekistan) Server Djeparov
LM	7	(South Korea) Kim Chi-woo	(yellow card) 37'	(substituted off) 70'
CF	9	(South Korea) Jung Jo-gook	(yellow card) 31'	(substituted off) 56'
CF	10	(Montenegro) Dejan Damjanović
Substitutions:
GK	34	(South Korea) Jo Su-huk
DF	15	(South Korea) Park Yong-ho		(substituted on) 81'
MF	14	(South Korea) Kim Han-yoon
MF	35	(South Korea) Choi Hyun-tae	(yellow card) 86'	(substituted on) 56'
MF	39	(South Korea) Kim Tae-hwan
FW	11	(South Korea) Bang Seung-hwan
FW	28	(South Korea) Lee Seung-yeoul		(substituted on) 70'
Manager:
(Portugal) Nelo Vingada

GK	23	(South Korea) Kim Ho-jun
RB	2	(South Korea) Lee Sang-ho
CB	15	(South Korea) Hong Jeong-ho		(substituted off) 86'
CB	25	(South Korea) Kang Joon-woo	(yellow card) 65'
LB	13	(South Korea) Ma Chul-jun	(yellow card) 28'
CM	5	(South Korea) Park Hyun-beom	(yellow card) 31'
CM	8	(South Korea) Oh Seung-bum		(substituted off) 74'
RM	11	(South Korea) Bae Ki-jong		(substituted off) 58'
AM	39	(Brazil) Santos Júnior
LM	16	(South Korea) Kim Young-sin
CF	18	(South Korea) Kim Eun-jung
Substitutions:
GK	21	(South Korea) Han Dong-jin
DF	3	(South Korea) Kang Min-hyuk		(substituted on) 86'
DF	27	(South Korea) Lee In-sik
MF	7	(South Korea) Koo Ja-cheol	(yellow card) 81'	(substituted on) 74'
MF	45	(South Korea) Park Jin-ok
FW	10	(Brazil) Danilo Neco		(substituted on) 58'
FW	22	(South Korea) Lee Hyun-ho
Manager:
(South Korea) Park Kyung-hoon

Man of the match:
Adilson (FC Seoul)

Assistant referees:
Kim Jung-sik (South Korea)
Son Jae-sun (South Korea)
Fourth official:
Ko Keum-bok (South Korea)

FC Seoul won 4–3 on aggregate.

== Final table ==
Pos	Team	Qualification
1	FC Seoul (C)	Qualification for the Champions League
2	Jeju United	Qualification for the Champions League
3	Jeonbuk Hyundai Motors	Qualification for the Champions League
4	Seongnam Ilhwa Chunma	
5	Ulsan Hyundai	
6	Gyeongnam FC	

Source: RSSSF
(C) Champions

== See also ==
- 2010 in South Korean football
- 2010 K League
