= 2012 Sangju Sangmu Phoenix season =

Sangju Sangmu Phoenix
2012 season
- Chairman: Lee Jae-Chul
- Manager: Park Hang-Seo
- K-League: 14th
- Korean FA Cup: Round of 16
- Top goalscorer: League: Ko Cha-Won (3); Yoo Chang-Hyun (3); Lee Sung-Jae (3); All: Yoo Chang-Hyun (4)
- Highest home attendance: 5,710 vs Gwangju (March 4)
- Lowest home attendance: 1,063 vs Busan (April 28)
- Average home league attendance: 2,508 (as of May 20)
Home colours	Away colours

The 2012 season was Sangju Sangmu Phoenix's eleventh season in the K-League in South Korea. Sangju Sangmu Phoenix was competing in K-League and Korean FA Cup.

== Current squad ==
Note: Flags indicate national team as defined under FIFA eligibility rules; some limited exceptions apply. Players may hold more than one non-FIFA nationality.

No.	Pos.	Nation	Player
1	GK	KOR	Kwon Sun-Tae
2	MF	KOR	Choi Hyo-Jin
3	DF	KOR	Lee Jong-Chan
4	DF	KOR	Bang Dae-Jong
5	DF	KOR	Yong Hyun-Jin
6	DF	KOR	Kang Min-Woo
7	MF	KOR	Kim Chi-Woo
8	MF	KOR	Lee Jong-min
9	MF	KOR	Kim Yong-Tae
10	MF	KOR	Kim Jae-Sung
11	FW	KOR	Kim Min-Soo
12	MF	KOR	Kim Jung-Bin
13	FW	KOR	Lee Sung-Jae
14	MF	KOR	Kim Cheol-Ho
15	MF	KOR	Kim Beom-Jun
16	MF	KOR	Oh Won-Jong
17	MF	KOR	Kim Young-Sin
18	FW	KOR	Yoo Chang-Hyun
19	MF	KOR	Ko Cha-Won
20	MF	KOR	Baek Ji-Hoon

No.	Pos.	Nation	Player
21	GK	KOR	Kim Ho-Jun
22	DF	KOR	Kim Chi-Gon (captain)
23	DF	KOR	Lee Yoon-Eui
24	MF	KOR	Kim Sung-Min
25	DF	KOR	Jang Suk-Won
26	MF	KOR	Oh Bong-Jin
27	MF	KOR	Ha Sung-Min
28	MF	KOR	Park Sang-Hee
29	DF	KOR	Kim Young-Bin
30	MF	KOR	Hwang Byung-In
31	GK	KOR	Lee Sang-Ki
32	DF	KOR	Kim Hyung-Il
33	MF	KOR	Kim Hong-Il
34	DF	KOR	Lee Sang-Hee
35	FW	KOR	Kim Myung-Woon
36	DF	KOR	Jeong Ho-Jeong
37	FW	KOR	Jung Jung-Seok
38	MF	KOR	Lee Jong-Sung
39	FW	KOR	Shin Yeon-Soo
41	GK	KOR	Kang Sung-Kwan

== Transfer ==
=== In ===
No.	Pos.	Nation	Player
—	MF	KOR	Kim Sung-Min (from Gwangju FC)
—	MF	KOR	Kim Hong-Il (from Gwangju FC)
—	DF	KOR	Lee Sang-Hee (from Daejeon Citizen)
—	DF	KOR	Kim Young-Bin (from Daejeon Citizen)
—	DF	KOR	Yong Hyun-Jin (from Seongnam Ilhwa Chunma)
—	MF	KOR	Park Sang-Hee (from Seongnam Ilhwa Chunma)
—	DF	KOR	Jeong Ho-Jeong (from Seongnam Ilhwa Chunma)
—	GK	KOR	Kang Sung-Kwan (from Seongnam Ilhwa Chunma)
—	DF	KOR	Jang Suk-Won (from Seongnam Ilhwa Chunma)
—	FW	KOR	Lee Jong-Sung (from Suwon Samsung Bluewings)
—	MF	KOR	Shin Yeon-Soo (from Suwon Samsung Bluewings)
—	MF	KOR	Baek Ji-Hoon (from Suwon Samsung Bluewings)
—	MF	KOR	Bang Dae-Jong (from Chunnam Dragons)
—	MF	KOR	Ha Sung-Min (from Jeonbuk Hyundai Motors)
—	GK	KOR	Kim Ho-Jun (from Jeju United)
—	MF	KOR	Kim Young-Sin (from Jeju United)
—	MF	KOR	Kim Jung-Bin (from Pohang Steelers)
—	MF	KOR	Kim Jae-Sung (from Pohang Steelers)
—	FW	KOR	Jeong Jung-Seok (from Pohang Steelers)
—	DF	KOR	Kim Hyung-Il (from Pohang Steelers)
—	FW	KOR	Kim Myung-Woon (from Incheon United)
—	MF	KOR	Lee Sang-Hyup (from Jeju United)
—	DF	KOR	Choi Chul-Soon (from Jeonbuk Hyundai Motors)
—	DF	KOR	An Il-Joo (from Pohang Steelers)

=== Out ===
No.	Pos.	Nation	Player

== Coaching staff ==
Position	Staff
Manager	(South Korea) Park Hang-Seo
Assistant Manager	(South Korea) Kim Tae-Wan
Coach	(South Korea) Gu Sang-Bum
Coach	(South Korea) Choi Jong-Bum
GK Coach	(South Korea) Seo Dong-Myung

Last updated: 28 March 2012
Source: Sangju Sangmu Phoenix

== Match results ==
=== K-League ===
All times are Korea Standard Time (KST) – UTC+9

Date Round	Home	Score	Away	Location

4 March 1	Sangju	0 – 1	Gwangju	Sangju, Gyeongbuk
15:00		Report	João Paulo 85'	Stadium: Sangju Civic Stadium; Attendance: 5,710; Referee: Lee Jong-Guk

11 March 2	Seongnam	1 – 1	Sangju	Seongnam, Gyeonggi
15:00	Jovančić 90+5'	Report	Ko Cha-Won 50'	Stadium: Tancheon Sports Complex; Attendance: 6,725; Referee: Woo Sang-Il

17 March 3	Gyeongnam	2 – 3	Sangju	Changwon, Gyeongnam
15:00	Kim In-Han 11'; Caíque 84'	Report	Yoo Chang-Hyun 41' (Assist by No.2); Kim Hyung-Il 41' (Assist by No.7); Ko Cha-Won 41' (Assist by No.11)	Stadium: Changwon Football Center; Attendance: 2,404; Referee: Kim Sang-Woo

25 March 4	Sangju	1 – 2	Pohang	Sangju, Gyeongbuk
15:00	Yoo Chang-Hyun 45' (Assist by No.7); Kim Hyung-Il (yellow card) 87' (yellow-red card) 90+2'	Report	Cho Chan-Ho 60'; Zicu 90+3'	Stadium: Sangju Civic Stadium; Attendance: 2,043; Referee: Moon Jin-Hee

31 March 5	Ulsan	2 – 2	Sangju	Nam-gu, Ulsan
15:00	Kang Min-Soo 51'; Lee Keun-Ho 56' (pen.)	Report	Kim Jae-Sung 37' (Assist by No.7); Ko Cha-Won 45' (Assist by No.18)	Stadium: Ulsan Munsu Football Stadium; Attendance: 3,349; Referee: Ko Keum-Bok

8 April 6	Seoul	2 – 0	Sangju	Mapo-gu, Seoul
17:00	Damjanović 39', 87'	Report		Stadium: Seoul World Cup Stadium; Attendance: 10,099; Referee: Kim Wan-Tae

11 April 7	Sangju	1 – 2	Daejeon	Sangju, Gyeongbuk
15:00	Yoo Chang-Hyun 55' (Assist by No.13)	Report	Kim Chang-Hoon 10'; Baba 42'	Stadium: Sangju Civic Stadium; Attendance: 1,627; Referee: Kim Jong-Hyuk

15 April 8	Sangju	1 – 0	Incheon	Sangju, Gyeongbuk
15:00	Kim Jae-Sung 31'	Report		Stadium: Sangju Civic Stadium; Attendance: 2,533; Referee: Lee Dong-Jun

21 April 9	Daegu	2 – 1	Sangju	Suseong-gu, Daegu
15:00	Leandrinho 38'; Matheus 68'	Report	Kim Cheol-Ho 50' (Assist by No.20)	Stadium: Daegu Stadium; Attendance: 7,714; Referee: Lee Jong-Guk

28 April 10	Sangju	1 – 2	Busan	Sangju, Gyeongbuk
17:00	Kim Chi-Gon 77' (Assist by No.10)	Report	Park Jong-Woo 40'; Lee Jong-Won 51'	Stadium: Sangju Civic Stadium; Attendance: 1,063; Referee: Song Min-Seok

5 May 11	Gangwon	0 – 3	Sangju	Gangneung, Gangwon
15:00		Report	Lee Sung-Jae 65' (Assist by No.9); Kim Cheol-Ho 67'; Lee Sung-Jae 89' (Assist by No.7)	Stadium: Gangneung Stadium; Attendance: 6,932; Referee: Kim Sung-Ho

12 May 12	Sangju	1 – 2	Chunnam	Sangju, Gyeongbuk
15:00	Lee Sung-Jae 80' (Assist by No.7)	Report	Kim Shin-young 53'; Ju Sung-Hwan 77'	Stadium: Sangju Civic Stadium; Attendance: 1,995; Referee: Lee Min-Hu

20 May 13	Sangju	0 – 3	Jeonbuk	Sangju, Gyeongbuk
17:00		Report	Eninho 5'; Kim Jung-Woo 42', 85' (pen.)	Stadium: Sangju Civic Stadium; Attendance: 2,582; Referee: An Yong-Hee

27 May 14	Jeju	2 – 1	Sangju	Seogwipo, Jeju
15:00	Oh Ban-Suk 20'; Santos 68'	Report	Kim Young-Sin 18' (Assist by No.27)	Stadium: Jeju World Cup Stadium; Attendance: 10,117; Referee: Ko Keum-Bok

14 June 15	Sangju	0 – 3	Suwon	Sangju, Gyeongbuk
19:00		Report	Ristić 18', 90+3'; Ha Tae-Goon 90'	Stadium: Sangju Civic Stadium; Attendance: 5,102; Referee: Choi Myung-Yong

17 June 16	Sangju	2 – 1	Gangwon	Sangju, Gyeongbuk
19:00	Park Sang-Hee 90' (Assist by No.4); Park Sang-Hee 90+3' (Assist by No.19)	Report	Chang Hyuk-Jin 86'	Stadium: Sangju Civic Stadium; Attendance: 3,345; Referee: Kim Sung-Ho

23 June 17	Incheon	1 – 0	Sangju	Nam-gu, Incheon
19:00	Seol Ki-Hyeon 90+3'	Report		Stadium: Incheon Football Stadium; Attendance: 2,755; Referee: Lee Jong-Guk

28 June 18	Sangju	0 – 1	FC Seoul	Sangju
19:00		Report	Ko Yo-Han 38'	Stadium: Sangju Civic Stadium; Attendance: 4,008; Referee: Song Min-Seok

1 July 19	Jeonbuk Hyundai Motors	2 – 0	Sangju	Jeonju
20:00	Droguett 13', 72'; Lee Dong-Gook (yellow card) 88'	Report	Choi Hyo-Jin (yellow card) 16'	Stadium: Jeonju World Cup Stadium; Attendance: 8,805; Referee: Kim Dong-Jin

8 July 20	Pohang Steelers	0 – 1	Sangju	Pohang, North Gyeongsang
20:00	Kim Dae-Ho (yellow card) 28'; Shin Jin-Ho (yellow card) 35'; Shin Hyung-Min (yellow card) 50'	Report	Kim Myung-Woon 5'; Kim Jae-Sung (yellow card) 28' (yellow-red card) 70'; Park Sang-Hee (yellow card) 29'; Lee Jong-min (yellow card) 78'	Stadium: Pohang Steel Yard; Attendance: 12,067; Referee: Kim Dae-Yong

14 July 21	Sangju	1 – 1	Daegu	Sangju
20:30	Ha Sung-Min (yellow card) 79'; Lee Sang-Hyup 80'	Report	Song Je-Heon 45'; Lee Jin-Ho (yellow card) 79'	Stadium: Sangju Civic Stadium; Attendance: 2,013; Referee: Woo Sang-Il

21 July 22	Daejeon Citizen	2 – 2	Sangju	Daejeon
20:00	Oris 8'; Alex Terra 23'		Bang Dae-Jong 19'; Kim Yong-Tae 84'	Stadium: Daejeon World Cup Stadium

25 July 23	Chunnam Dragons	–	Sangju	Gwangyang
20:30				Stadium: Gwangyang Football Stadium

28 July 24	Sangju	–	Gyeongnam	Sangju
18:00				Stadium: Sangju Civic Stadium

4 August 25	Sangju	–	Jeju United	Sangju
20:30				Stadium: Sangju Civic Stadium

8 August 26	Gwangju	–	Sangju	Gwangju
21:00				Stadium: Gwangju World Cup Stadium

11 August 27	Suwon Bluewings	–	Sangju	Suwon
20:00				Stadium: Suwon World Cup Stadium

19 August 28	Sangju	–	Seongnam Ilhwa Chunma	Sangju
18:00				Stadium: Sangju Civic Stadium

22 August 29	Sangju	–	Ulsan Hyundai	Sangju
20:00				Stadium: Sangju Civic Stadium

26 August 30	Busan IPark	–	Sangju	Busan
20:00				Stadium: Busan Asiad Main Stadium

==== League table ====
Pos	Team	Pld	W	D	L	GF	GA	GD	Pts	Qualification or relegation
12	Seongnam Ilhwa Chunma	44	14	10	20	47	56	−9	52	
13	Daejeon Citizen	44	13	11	20	46	67	−21	50	
14	Gangwon FC	44	14	7	23	57	68	−11	49	
15	Gwangju FC (R)	44	10	15	19	57	67	−10	45	Relegation to the K League Challenge
16	Sangju Sangmu Phoenix (R)	44	7	6	31	29	74	−45	27	Withdrawal (Note: Sangju Sangmu Phoenix were going to be forcibly relegated to the second division by K League Federation regardless of the results after they failed to get a club license from the Asian Football Confederation. They withdrew after the 31st matchweek once their relegation was confirmed.)

Source: K League
Rules for classification: 1) Points; 2) Goal difference; 3) Goals scored.
(R) Relegated

==== Results summary ====
Overall								Home						Away					
Pld	W	D	L	GF	GA	GD	Pts	W	D	L	GF	GA	GD	W	D	L	GF	GA	GD
21	5	3	13	20	32	−12	18	2	1	8	8	18	−10	3	2	5	12	14	−2

==== Results by round ====
Round	1	2	3	4	5	6	7	8	9	10	11	12	13	14	15	16	17	18	19	20	21	22	23	24	25	26	27	28	29	30	31	32	33	34	35	36	37	38	39	40	41	42	43	44
Ground	H	A	A	H	A	A	H	H	A	H	A	H	H	A	H	H	A	H	A	A	H																							
Result	L	D	W	L	D	L	L	W	L	L	W	L	L	L	L	W	L	L	L	W	D																							
Position	12	10	7	10	9	12	14	12	13	13	12	12	12	14	15	13	14	15	16	16	15																							

Updated to match(es) played on 15 July 2012. Source: League Fixtures and Results
A = Away; H = Home; W = Win; D = Draw; L = Loss

=== Korean FA Cup ===
23 May Round of 32	Sangju Sangmu Phoenix	2 – 1	Ulsan Hyundai Mipo Dolphins	Gimcheon, Gyeongbuk
19:00 KST	Yoo Chang-Hyun 56' (Assist by No.10); Kim Jae-Sung 88'		Lee Yong-Joon 75'; Kim Ho-You (yellow card) 80' (yellow-red card) 85'	Stadium: Gimcheon Stadium; Attendance: 800; Referee: Woo Sang-Il

20 June Round of 16	Daejeon Citizen	2 – 2 (a.e.t.) (4 – 2 p)	Sangju Sangmu Phoenix	Yuseong-gu, Daejeon
19:00 KST	Kang Woo-Ram 26'; Oris 107'		Alessandro 67' (o.g.); Lee Sung-Jae 98'	Stadium: Daejeon World Cup Stadium; Attendance: 1,055; Referee: Lee Cheon-Su
	Penalties
	Kim Tae-Yeon (penalty scored); Kim Chang-Hoon (penalty scored); Han Geuru (penalty scored); Alessandro (penalty scored)		(penalty scored) Kim Chi-Gon; (penalty missed) Bang Dae-Jong; (penalty scored) Choi Hyo-Jin; (penalty missed) Kim Yong-Tae

== Squad statistics ==
=== Appearances ===
Statistics accurate as of match played 28 June 2012

No.	Nat.	Pos.	Name	League		FA Cup		Appearances		Goals
No.	Nat.	Pos.	Name	Apps	Goals	Apps	Goals	App (sub)	Total	Goals
1	(South Korea)	GK	Kwon Sun-Tae	6	0	0	0	6 (0)	6	0
2	(South Korea)	MF	Choi Hyo-Jin	16	0	1 (1)	0	17 (1)	18	0
3	(South Korea)	DF	Lee Jong-Chan	0 (1)	0	0	0	0 (1)	1	0
4	(South Korea)	DF	Bang Dae-Jong	5 (2)	0	1 (1)	0	6 (3)	9	0
5	(South Korea)	DF	Yong Hyun-Jin	12	0	1	0	13 (0)	13	0
6	(South Korea)	DF	Kang Min-Woo	0	0	0	0	0	0	0
7	(South Korea)	MF	Kim Chi-Woo	12	0	1	0	13 (0)	13	0
8	(South Korea)	MF	Lee Jong-min	7 (3)	0	2	0	9 (3)	12	0
9	(South Korea)	MF	Kim Yong-Tae	7 (2)	0	1 (1)	0	8 (3)	11	0
10	(South Korea)	MF	Kim Jae-Sung	15	2	2	1	17 (0)	17	3
11	(South Korea)	FW	Kim Min-Soo	5 (4)	0	0	0	5 (4)	9	0
12	(South Korea)	MF	Kim Jung-Bin	1	0	0	0	1 (0)	1	0
13	(South Korea)	FW	Lee Sung-Jae	2 (10)	3	0 (2)	1	2 (12)	14	4
14	(South Korea)	MF	Kim Cheol-Ho	8 (3)	2	0	0	8 (3)	11	2
15	(South Korea)	MF	Kim Beom-Jun	0	0	0	0	0	0	0
16	(South Korea)	MF	Oh Won-Jong	0	0	0	0	0	0	0
17	(South Korea)	MF	Kim Young-Sin	13 (1)	1	1	0	14 (1)	15	1
18	(South Korea)	FW	Yoo Chang-Hyun	15 (2)	3	2	1	17 (2)	19	4
19	(South Korea)	MF	Ko Cha-Won	9 (3)	3	1	0	10 (3)	13	3
20	(South Korea)	MF	Baek Ji-Hoon	4 (6)	0	0 (1)	0	4 (7)	11	0
21	(South Korea)	GK	Kim Ho-Jun	8	0	1	0	9 (0)	9	0
22	(South Korea)	DF	Kim Chi-Gon	17	1	1	0	18 (0)	18	1
23	(South Korea)	DF	Lee Yoon-Eui	0	0	0	0	0	0	0
24	(South Korea)	MF	Kim Sung-Min	0 (1)	0	1	0	1 (1)	2	0
25	(South Korea)	DF	Jang Suk-Won	0 (1)	0	0	0	0 (1)	1	0
26	(South Korea)	MF	Oh Bong-Jin	0	0	0	0	0	0	0
27	(South Korea)	MF	Ha Sung-Min	15 (1)	0	2	0	17 (1)	18	0
28	(South Korea)	MF	Park Sang-Hee	0 (3)	2	1 (1)	0	1 (4)	5	2
29	(South Korea)	DF	Kim Young-Bin	0	0	0	0	0	0	0
30	(South Korea)	MF	Hwang Byung-In	0	0	0	0	0	0	0
31	(South Korea)	GK	Lee Sang-Ki	4	0	1	0	5 (0)	5	0
32	(South Korea)	DF	Kim Hyung-Il	11	1	0	0	11 (0)	11	1
33	(South Korea)	MF	Kim Hong-Il	0	0	0	0	0	0	0
34	(South Korea)	DF	Lee Sang-Hee	0	0	0	0	0	0	0
35	(South Korea)	FW	Kim Myung-Woon	1 (3)	0	0	0	1 (3)	4	0
36	(South Korea)	DF	Jeong Ho-Jeong	5 (3)	0	2	0	7 (3)	10	0
37	(South Korea)	FW	Jung Jung-Seok	0	0	0	0	0	0	0
38	(South Korea)	MF	Lee Jong-Sung	0	0	0	0	0	0	0
39	(South Korea)	FW	Shin Yeon-Soo	0 (1)	0	0	0	0 (1)	1	0
41	(South Korea)	GK	Kang Sung-Kwan	0	0	0	0	0	0	0

=== Goals and assists ===
Rank	Nation	Number	Name	K-League		KFA Cup		Sum		Total
Rank	Nation	Number	Name	Goals	Assists	Goals	Assists	Goals	Assists	Total
1	(South Korea)	13	Lee Sung-Jae	3	1	1	0	4	1	5
=	(South Korea)	18	Yoo Chang-Hyun	3	1	1	0	4	1	5
=	(South Korea)	10	Kim Jae-Sung	2	1	1	1	3	2	5
=	(South Korea)	7	Kim Chi-Woo	0	5	0	0	0	5	5
2	(South Korea)	19	Ko Cha-Won	3	1	0	0	3	1	4
3	(South Korea)	14	Kim Cheol-Ho	2	0	0	0	2	0	2
=	(South Korea)	28	Park Sang-Hee	2	0	0	0	2	0	2
4	(South Korea)	17	Kim Young-Sin	1	0	0	0	1	0	1
=	(South Korea)	22	Kim Chi-Gon	1	0	0	0	1	0	1
=	(South Korea)	32	Kim Hyung-Il	1	0	0	0	1	0	1
=	(South Korea)	2	Choi Hyo-Jin	0	1	0	0	0	1	1
=	(South Korea)	4	Bang Dae-Jong	0	1	0	0	0	1	1
=	(South Korea)	9	Kim Yong-Tae	0	1	0	0	0	1	1
=	(South Korea)	11	Kim Min-Soo	0	1	0	0	0	1	1
=	(South Korea)	20	Baek Ji-Hoon	0	1	0	0	0	1	1
=	(South Korea)	27	Ha Sung-Min	0	1	0	0	0	1	1
/	/	/	Own Goals	0	-	1	-	1	-	1
/	/	/	TOTALS	18	15	4	1	22	16	

=== Discipline ===
Position	Nation	Number	Name	K-League		KFA Cup		Total	
Position	Nation	Number	Name	Yellow card	Red card	Yellow card	Red card	Yellow card	Red card
GK	(South Korea)	1	Kwon Sun-Tae	1	0	0	0	1	0
MF	(South Korea)	2	Choi Hyo-Jin	4	0	0	0	4	0
DF	(South Korea)	4	Bang Dae-Jong	0	0	1	0	1	0
DF	(South Korea)	5	Yong Hyun-Jin	4	0	0	0	4	0
MF	(South Korea)	7	Kim Chi-Woo	4	0	0	0	4	0
MF	(South Korea)	8	Lee Jong-min	2	0	0	0	2	0
MF	(South Korea)	9	Kim Yong-Tae	1	0	0	0	1	0
MF	(South Korea)	10	Kim Jae-Sung	4	0	1	0	5	0
MF	(South Korea)	17	Kim Young-Sin	2	0	0	0	2	0
FW	(South Korea)	18	Yoo Chang-Hyun	2	0	0	0	2	0
MF	(South Korea)	19	Ko Cha-Won	2	0	1	0	3	0
MF	(South Korea)	20	Baek Ji-Hoon	1	0	0	0	1	0
DF	(South Korea)	22	Kim Chi-Gon	3	0	0	0	3	0
MF	(South Korea)	27	Ha Sung-Min	4	0	0	0	4	0
GK	(South Korea)	31	Lee Sang-Ki	1	0	0	0	1	0
DF	(South Korea)	32	Kim Hyung-Il	3	1	0	0	3	1
/	/	/	TOTALS	38	1	3	0	41	1
