= Kang Min-hyeok =

Kang Min-hyeok or Kang Min-hyok (Korean: 강민혁) may refer to:

- Gang Min-hyeok (born 1981), South Korean skier
- Kang Min-hyuk (footballer) (born 1982), South Korean footballer
- Kang Min-hyuk (born 1991), South Korean singer and actor
- Kang Min-hyuk (badminton) (born 1999), South Korean badminton player
