= Eraldo =

Eraldo is a male given name of Italian origin.

People with the given name Eraldo include:

- Eraldo Anicio Gomes, Brazilian footballer
- Eraldo Bernocchi, Italian musician, producer and sound designer
- Eraldo Correia, Brazilian footballer
- Eraldo Da Roma, Italian film editor
- Eraldo Monzeglio, Italian footballer
- Eraldo Pecci, Italian footballer
- Eraldo Pizzo, Italian water polo player
