= Cho Won-kwang =

South Korean footballer (born 1985)

Cho Won-Kwang
Personal information
- Full name: Cho Won-Kwang
- Date of birth: 23 August 1985 (age 41)
- Place of birth: Seoul, South Korea
- Height: 1.82 m (6 ft 0 in)
- Positions: Defender; forward

Team information
- Current team: Cheonan City
- Number: 2

Senior career*
Years	Team	Apps	(Gls)
2002–2003	Anyang LG Cheetahs	0	(0)
2004–2006	Sochaux-Montbéliard	0	(0)
2007–2008	Incheon United	2	(0)
2009	Cheonan City	23	(0)
2010–2011	Jeju United	0	(0)
2011–	Cheonan City	12	(0)

International career^{‡}
2003–2005	South Korea U-20	13	(1)
- * Club domestic league appearances and goals as of 28 November 2011 ‡ National team caps and goals as of 10 July 2008

- Cho Won-kwang
- Hangul: 조원광
- Hanja: 趙源光
- RR: Jo Wongwang
- MR: Cho Wŏn'gwang

Cho Won-Kwang (Korean: 조원광; born 23 August 1985) is a South Korean footballer, who plays for Cheonan City FC in the Korea National League.

His previous club was Anyang LG Cheetahs and Incheon United at K-League in South Korea and FC Sochaux-Montbéliard in France. He played reserve match at both team.

In November 2009, he was moved to Jeju United.

== Club career statistics ==
Club performance			League		Cup		League Cup		Continental		Total	
Season	Club	League	Apps	Goals	Apps	Goals	Apps	Goals	Apps	Goals	Apps	Goals
South Korea			League		KFA Cup		League Cup		Asia		Total	
2002	Anyang LG Cheetahs	K-League	0	0	0	0	0	0	0	0		
2003	Anyang LG Cheetahs	K-League	0	0	0	0	-		-		0	0
France			League		Coupe de France		Coupe de la Ligue		Europe		Total	
2003–04	Sochaux-Montbéliard	Ligue 1	0	0	0	0	0	0	-		0	0
2004–05	Sochaux-Montbéliard	Ligue 1	0	0	0	0	0	0	-		0	0
2005–06	Sochaux-Montbéliard	Ligue 1	0	0	0	0	0	0	-		0	0
South Korea			League		KFA Cup		League Cup		Asia		Total	
2007	Incheon United	K-League	0	0	0	0	0	0	-		0	0
2008	Incheon United	K-League	2	0	0	0	2	0	-		4	0
2009	Cheonan City	N-League	23	0			-		-		23	0
2010	Jeju United	K-League	0	0	0	0	0	0	-		0	0
Total	South Korea		25	0			2	0				
Total	France		0	0	0	0	0	0	-		0	0
Career total			25	0			2	0				
