= Kim Chi-woo =

South Korean footballer (born 1983)

Personal information
- Full name: Kim Chi-woo
- Date of birth: 11 November 1983 (age 43)
- Place of birth: Seoul, South Korea
- Height: 1.75 m (5 ft 9 in)
- Position: Left-back

Youth career
- 2001–2003: Chung-Ang University

Senior career*
| Years | Team | Apps | (Gls) |
| 2004–2006 | Incheon United | 52 | (0) |
| 2005 | → Partizan (loan) | 8 | (0) |
| 2007–2008 | Jeonnam Dragons | 37 | (2) |
| 2008–2017 | FC Seoul | 176 | (10) |
| 2011–2012 | → Sangju Sangmu Phoenix (loan) | 38 | (1) |
| 2018–2019 | Busan IPark | 51 | (1) |
| Total | | 362 | (14) |

International career
| 2003 | South Korea U20 | 4 | (0) |
| 2006 | South Korea U23 | | |
| 2006–2013 | South Korea | 28 | (5) |
- * Club domestic league appearances and goals

Kim Chi-woo (Korean: 김치우; born 11 November 1983) is a South Korean former footballer who played as a left-back.

== Club career ==
=== Incheon United ===
After attending Chung-Ang University, Kim joined newly formed K League club Incheon United in 2004. He made 17 league appearances in his debut season. Over his three years at Incheon, Kim played 52 games in the K League. He left the club after the 2006 season.

==== Loan to Partizan ====
In January 2005, Kim joined Partizan on an 18-month loan deal, receiving the number 13 shirt. He made eight league appearances until the end of the season, helping the club win the championship title with an unbeaten record.

=== Jeonnam Dragons ===
From 2007 to 2008, Kim played for Jeonnam Dragons in the K League, making 37 appearances and scoring two goals.

=== FC Seoul ===
Between 2008 and 2017, Kim spent eight and a half seasons with FC Seoul, totaling over 200 official appearances. He helped the club win three K League titles (2010, 2012, and 2016), one Korean FA Cup (2015) and one Korean League Cup (2010).

==== Loan to Sangju Sangmu Phoenix ====
In 2011, Kim was loaned to Sangju Sangmu Phoenix, staying with the club for one and a half years.

=== Busan IPark ===
In 2018, Kim signed with K League 2 club Busan IPark. He helped them win promotion to the top flight in the 2019 season.

== International career ==
=== Youth ===
At youth level, Kim represented South Korea in the 2003 FIFA World Youth Championship, as the team reached the knockout stage. He was also capped for the national under-23 team at the 2006 Asian Games, as South Korea lost in the bronze-medal match.

=== Senior ===
Between 2006 and 2013, Kim was capped 29 times for South Korea at full level, scoring five goals. He was a member of the team at the 2007 AFC Asian Cup.

== Career statistics ==
=== Club ===
Appearances and goals by club, season and competition
| Club | Season | League | | | National Cup | | League Cup | | Continental | | Other | | Total | |
| Club | Season | Division | Apps | Goals | Apps | Goals | Apps | Goals | Apps | Goals | Apps | Goals | Apps | Goals |
|---|---|---|---|---|---|---|---|---|---|---|---|---|---|---|
| Incheon United | 2004 | K League | 17 | 0 | | | 2 | 1 | — | | — | | 19 | 1 |
| Incheon United | 2005 | K League | 11 | 0 | | | 0 | 0 | — | | — | | 11 | 0 |
| Incheon United | 2006 | K League | 24 | 0 | | | 13 | 2 | — | | — | | 37 | 2 |
| Incheon United | Total | | 52 | 0 | | | 15 | 3 | — | | — | | 67 | 3 |
| Partizan (loan) | 2004–05 | First League of Serbia and Montenegro | 8 | 0 | 0 | 0 | — | | 0 | 0 | — | | 8 | 0 |
| Jeonnam Dragons | 2007 | K League | 24 | 1 | 5 | 2 | 1 | 0 | 3 (Note: Appearances in AFC Champions League) | 0 | — | | 33 | 3 |
| Jeonnam Dragons | 2008 | K League | 13 | 1 | 0 | 0 | 0 | 0 | 2 | 0 | — | | 15 | 1 |
| Jeonnam Dragons | Total | | 37 | 2 | 5 | 2 | 1 | 0 | 5 | 0 | — | | 48 | 4 |
| FC Seoul | 2008 | K League | 13 | 2 | 0 | 0 | 1 | 1 | — | | — | | 14 | 3 |
| FC Seoul | 2009 | K League | 20 | 3 | 1 | 0 | 2 | 0 | 6 | 2 | — | | 29 | 5 |
| FC Seoul | 2010 | K-League | 22 | 2 | 1 | 0 | 1 | 0 | — | | — | | 24 | 2 |
| FC Seoul | 2011 | K-League | 0 | 0 | 0 | 0 | 0 | 0 | 0 | 0 | — | | 0 | 0 |
| FC Seoul | 2012 | K-League | 8 | 0 | 0 | 0 | — | | — | | — | | 8 | 0 |
| FC Seoul | 2013 | K League Classic | 24 | 1 | 3 | 0 | — | | 9 | 0 | — | | 36 | 1 |
| FC Seoul | 2014 | K League Classic | 25 | 1 | 2 | 0 | — | | 9 | 1 | — | | 36 | 2 |
| FC Seoul | 2015 | K League Classic | 17 | 1 | 1 | 0 | — | | 7 | 0 | — | | 25 | 1 |
| FC Seoul | 2016 | K League Classic | 26 | 0 | 4 | 0 | — | | 4 | 0 | — | | 34 | 0 |
| FC Seoul | 2017 | K League Classic | 21 | 0 | 1 | 0 | — | | 3 | 0 | — | | 25 | 0 |
| FC Seoul | Total | | 176 | 10 | 13 | 0 | 4 | 1 | 38 | 3 | — | | 231 | 14 |
| Sangju Sangmu Phoenix (loan) | 2011 | K-League | 26 | 1 | 1 | 0 | 2 | 1 | — | | — | | 29 | 2 |
| Sangju Sangmu Phoenix (loan) | 2012 | K-League | 12 | 0 | 1 | 0 | — | | — | | — | | 13 | 0 |
| Sangju Sangmu Phoenix (loan) | Total | | 38 | 1 | 2 | 0 | 2 | 1 | — | | — | | 42 | 2 |
| Busan IPark | 2018 | K League 2 | 28 | 1 | 0 | 0 | — | | — | | 2 (Note: Appearances in promotion/relegation playoffs) | 0 | 30 | 1 |
| Busan IPark | 2019 | K League 2 | 23 | 0 | 1 | 0 | — | | — | | 2 | 0 | 26 | 0 |
| Busan IPark | Total | | 51 | 1 | 1 | 0 | — | | — | | 4 | 0 | 56 | 1 |
| Career total | | | 362 | 14 | 21 | 2 | 22 | 5 | 43 | 3 | 4 | 0 | 452 | 24 |

=== International ===
Appearances and goals by national team and year
| National team | Year | Apps | Goals |
|---|---|---|---|
| South Korea | 2006 | 2 | 0 |
| South Korea | 2007 | 8 | 0 |
| South Korea | 2008 | 7 | 0 |
| South Korea | 2009 | 6 | 2 |
| South Korea | 2010 | 0 | 0 |
| South Korea | 2011 | 0 | 0 |
| South Korea | 2012 | 2 | 2 |
| South Korea | 2013 | 3 | 1 |
| Total | | 28 | 5 |

=== International goals ===
Scores and results list South Korea's goal tally first.

| No. | Date | Venue | Opponent | Score | Result | Competition |
|---|---|---|---|---|---|---|
| 1 | 28 March 2009 | Suwon World Cup Stadium, Suwon, South Korea | Iraq | 1–1 | 2–1 | Friendly |
| 2 | 1 April 2009 | Seoul World Cup Stadium, Seoul, South Korea | North Korea | 1–0 | 1–0 | 2010 FIFA World Cup qualification |
| 3 | 25 February 2012 | Jeonju World Cup Stadium, Jeonju, South Korea | Uzbekistan | 3–0 | 4–2 | Friendly |
| 4 | 25 February 2012 | Jeonju World Cup Stadium, Jeonju, South Korea | Uzbekistan | 4–2 | 4–2 | Friendly |
| 5 | 4 June 2013 | Camille Chamoun Sports City Stadium, Beirut, Lebanon | Lebanon | 1–1 | 1–1 | 2014 FIFA World Cup qualification |

== Honours ==
Partizan

- First League of Serbia and Montenegro: 2004–05

Jeonnam Dragons

- Korean FA Cup: 2007

FC Seoul

- K-League / K League Classic: 2010, 2012, 2016
- Korean FA Cup: 2015
- Korean League Cup: 2010
