= Lee Jin-hyung =

South Korean footballer

Lee Jin-Hyung
Personal information
- Full name: Lee Jin-Hyung
- Date of birth: 22 February 1988 (age 38)
- Place of birth: South Korea
- Height: 1.89 m (6 ft 2 1/2 in)
- Position: Goalkeeper

Youth career
- 2006–2009: Dankook University

Senior career*
Years	Team	Apps	(Gls)
2010–2012	Jeju United	0	(0)
2013–2017	FC Anyang	66	(0)
2015–2016	→ Ansan Police (army)	49	(0)
2017–2018	Incheon United	29	(0)
2019–2021	Gwangju FC	26	(0)

International career
2006–2007	South Korea U-20		
- * Club domestic league appearances and goals as of 9 January 2022

Lee Jin-Hyung (Korean: 이진형; born 22 February 1988) is a South Korean footballer who plays as goalkeeper.

== Career ==
He was selected by Jeju United in 2010 K League Draft.
