= Kim Myung-hwan =

South Korean footballer (born 1987)

Kim Myung-Hwan
Personal information
- Full name: Kim Myung-Hwan
- Date of birth: 6 March 1987 (age 39)
- Place of birth: South Korea
- Height: 1.75 m (5 ft 9 in)
- Position: Defender

Senior career*
Years	Team	Apps	(Gls)
2007–2010	Jeju United	28	(0)

International career
2005	South Korea U-20	2	(0)
- * Club domestic league appearances and goals

Kim Myung-Hwan (born 6 March 1987) is a South Korean football defender.

He related match-fixing scandal and his football career was rescinded.
