= Lee Sang-hup =

South Korean footballer (born 1986)

Personal information
- Date of birth: 3 August 1986 (age 40)
- Place of birth: Yongin, Gyeonggi, South Korea
- Height: 1.79 m (5 ft 10 in)
- Position: Winger

Youth career
- 2002–2004: Dongbuk High School

Senior career*
Years	Team	Apps	(Gls)
2005–2009	FC Seoul	50	(9)
2010–2013	Jeju United	17	(5)
2011	→ Daejeon Citizen (loan)	7	(1)
2012–2014	→ Sangju Sangmu (army)	39	(18)
2014–2015	Jeonbuk Hyundai	31	(3)
2015	→ Seongnam FC (loan)	3	(0)
2016	Gyeongnam FC	1	(0)

International career
2003	South Korea U-17	3	(0)
2003–2004	South Korea U-20	4	(1)
- * Club domestic league appearances and goals as of 1 November 2016

- Lee Sang-hup
- Hangul: 이상협
- Hanja: 李相俠
- RR: I Sanghyeop
- MR: I Sanghyŏp

Lee Sang-hup (Korean: 이상협; born 3 August 1986) is a retired South Korean footballer who played as winger.

== Club career ==
In 2005, he debuted in K League for FC Seoul, and made 2 appearances in 2 years, inclusive of the K-League Cup, but began to increase the number of appearances by starter player from Şenol Güneş became the new manager. He has contributed to the runner-up for 2008 K-League.

He moved to Jeju United in 2010. In all competitions Lee scored 6 goals in 18 appearances for Jeju United.

On 29 July 2011, Lee joined Daejeon Citizen on loan from Jeju United.

== Club career statistics ==
Club performance			League		Cup		League Cup		Continental		Total	
Season	Club	League	Apps	Goals	Apps	Goals	Apps	Goals	Apps	Goals	Apps	Goals
Korea Republic			League		FA Cup		League Cup		Asia		Total	
2005	FC Seoul	K League	0	0	0	0	0	0	-		0	0
2006	FC Seoul	K League	0	0	0	0	2	1	-		2	1
2007	FC Seoul	K League	18	5	3	0	6	1	-		27	6
2008	FC Seoul	K League	13	2	0	0	4	1	-		17	3
2009	FC Seoul	K League	19	2	2	1	2	0	8	1	31	4
2010	Jeju United	K League	14	5	1	0	3	1	-		18	6
2011	Jeju United	K League	3	0	1	0	0	0	3	0	7	0
2011	Daejeon Citizen	K League	7	1	0	0	0	0	-		7	1
2012	Jeju United	K League										
Total			74	15	7	1	17	4	11	1	109	21

== Honours ==
=== Club ===
FC Seoul

- League Cup (1): 2006

Jeju United

- K League Runners Up: 2010
