= Mortugaba =

Municipality of Bahia, Brazil

Coordinates: 14°59′S 42°19′W

- Municipality
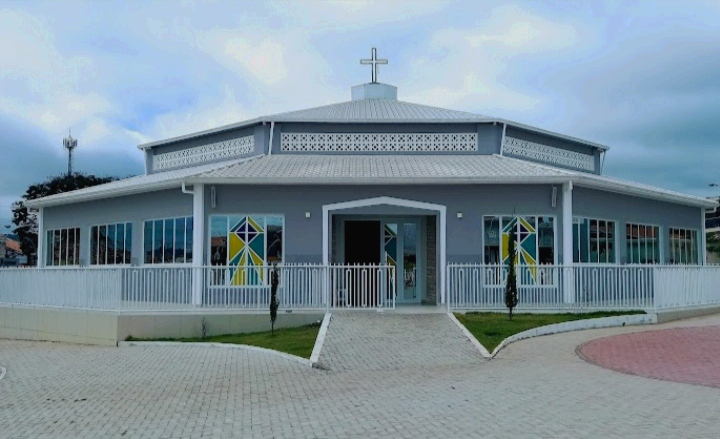
- Mortugaba Square and Mother Church, Bahia, Brazil

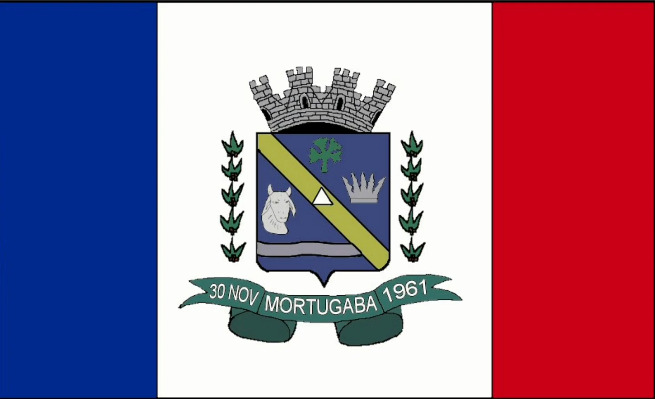
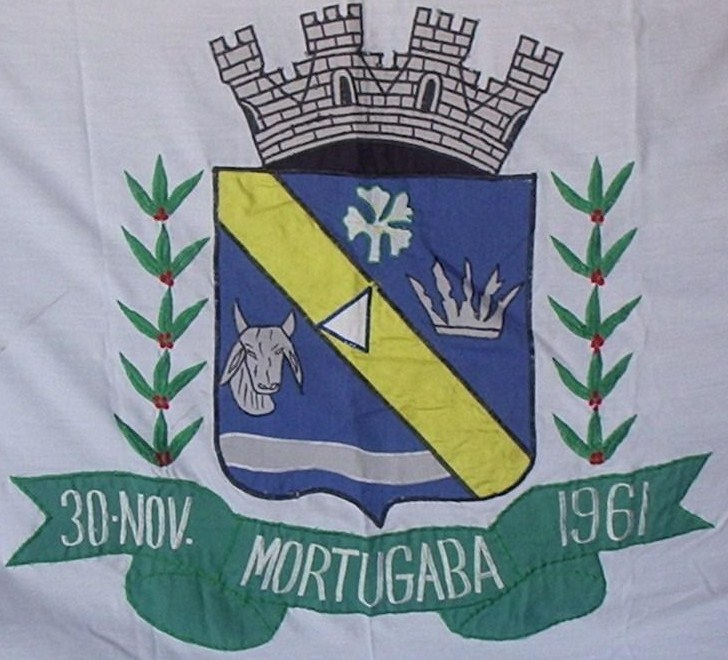
- Flag Coat of arms
- Interactive map of Mortugaba
- Country: Brazil
- Region: Nordeste
- State: Bahia

Population (2020)
  - Total: 12,052
- Time zone: UTC−3 (BRT)

Mortugaba is a municipality in the state of Bahia in the North-East region of Brazil.

== See also ==
- List of municipalities in Bahia
