= Bae Ki-jong =

South Korean footballer

Bae Ki-Jong 배기종
Personal information
- Date of birth: 26 May 1983 (age 43)
- Place of birth: Iksan, Jeonbuk, South Korea
- Height: 1.80 m (5 ft 11 in)
- Position: Winger

Team information
- Current team: Gyeongnam FC
- Number: 7

Youth career
- Kwangwoon University

Senior career*
| Years | Team | Apps | (Gls) |
| 2006 | Daejeon Citizen | 19 | (6) |
| 2007–2009 | Suwon Samsung | 32 | (4) |
| 2010–2015 | Jeju United | 64 | (12) |
| 2012–2013 | → Police (army) | 18 | (3) |
| 2014 | → Suwon Samsung (loan) | 14 | (3) |
| 2016– | Gyeongnam FC | 101 | (17) |

International career^{‡}
| 2009 | South Korea | 2 | (0) |
- * Club domestic league appearances and goals as of 6 January 2020 ‡ National team caps and goals as of 6 June 2009

- Bae Ki-jong
- Hangul: 배기종
- Hanja: 裵起鐘
- RR: Bae Gijong
- MR: Pae Kijong

Bae Ki-Jong (Korean: 배기종, Korean pronunciation: [pɛ̝.ɡi.dʑoŋ] or [pɛ̝] [ki.dʑoŋ]; born 26 May 1983) is a South Korean footballer, who plays as forward for Gyeongnam FC. He has also represented South Korea internationally.

== Career ==
=== Club career ===
Bae's first club was Daejeon Citizen. With them he was nominated Rookie of the Year award. At the end of 2006, he transferred to Suwon Samsung Bluewings.

On 17 December 2009, he moved to Jeju United. In his first season with the Jeju, Bae scored five league goals and one assists. In his second season with the Jeju, Bae scored his first goal of the new season in a 2–1 win over Busan I'Park on 6 March 2011.

=== International career ===
On 28 March 2009, he made his first international match appearance against Iraq.

== Club career statistics ==
As of 8 May 2017

| Club performance | | | League | | FA Cup | | League Cup | | Continental | | Total | |
| Season | Club | League | Apps | Goals | Apps | Goals | Apps | Goals | Apps | Goals | Apps | Goals |
| South Korea | | | League | | KFA Cup | | League Cup | | Asia | | Total | |
|---|---|---|---|---|---|---|---|---|---|---|---|---|
| 2006 | Daejeon Citizen | K League 1 | 19 | 6 | 1 | 0 | 8 | 1 | - | | 28 | 7 |
| 2007 | Suwon Samsung Bluewings | K League 1 | 12 | 0 | 2 | 0 | 5 | 0 | - | | 19 | 0 |
| 2008 | Suwon Samsung Bluewings | K League 1 | 11 | 3 | 1 | 0 | 5 | 2 | - | | 17 | 5 |
| 2009 | Suwon Samsung Bluewings | K League 1 | 9 | 1 | 1 | 0 | 2 | 0 | 4 | 2 | 16 | 3 |
| 2010 | Jeju United | K League 1 | 21 | 5 | 3 | 0 | 3 | 0 | - | | 27 | 5 |
| 2011 | Jeju United | K League 1 | 26 | 3 | 1 | 0 | 0 | 0 | 6 | 1 | 33 | 4 |
| 2016 | Gyeongnam FC | K League 2 | 15 | 4 | 0 | 0 | 0 | 0 | - | | 15 | 4 |
| 2017 | Gyeongnam FC | K League 2 | 9 | 2 | 0 | 0 | 0 | 0 | - | | 9 | 2 |
| Career total | | | 98 | 18 | 9 | 0 | 23 | 3 | 10 | 3 | 140 | 24 |
