= Léo Mineiro =

Brazilian footballer (born 1990)

Personal information
- Full name: Leonardo Henrique Santos de Souza
- Date of birth: 10 March 1990 (age 36)
- Place of birth: Belo Horizonte, Minas Gerais, Brazil
- Height: 1.78 m (5 ft 10 in)
- Position: Second striker

Team information
- Current team: Morro Velho

Senior career*
Years	Team	Apps	(Gls)
2006–2007	Cruzeiro		
2008–2010	América-MG	1	(0)
2010	→ Jeju United (loan)	2	(0)
2011–2012	América-MG	14	(1)
2012–2015	Atlético Paranaense	3	(0)
2012	→ Ipatinga (loan)	20	(1)
2013	→ XV de Novembro (loan)	10	(1)
2014	→ Villa Nova (loan)	8	(3)
2014	→ Paraná Clube (loan)	6	(1)
2015–2018	Coimbra		
2015–2016	→ FC Gifu (loan)	72	(20)
2017	→ Daegu FC (loan)	19	(7)
2017	→ Busan IPark (loan)	2	(0)
2018	Al-Markhiya	9	(2)
2018	Avispa Fukuoka	16	(4)
2019–2020	Fagiano Okayama	10	(0)
2020–2021	FC Imabari	15	(4)
2022	Camboriú	1	(0)
2022	Betim	4	(1)
2022	Morro Velho		
2022	Montreal EC		
2023	Seleção Machadense		
2023	Montreal EC		
2023	Alfenense		
2024	Real SB		
2024	Tangará		
2024	Morro Velho		
2024	Guarany		
2024–	Morro Velho		
- * Club domestic league appearances and goals

Léo Mineiro (born 10 March 1990) is a Brazilian footballer.

== Club team career statistics ==
Updated as of 5 December 2017.

Club performance			League		Cup		Total	
Season	Club	League	Apps	Goals	Apps	Goals	Apps	Goals
2009	América-MG	Série C	0	0	–		0	0
2010	Jeju United	K-League	2	0	–		2	0
2010	América-MG	Série B	1	0	–		1	0
2011	América-MG	Série A	14	1	–		14	1
2012	América-MG	Série A	0	0	–		0	0
2012	Atlético Paranaense	Série B	3	0	–		3	0
2012	Ipatinga	Mineiro	20	1	–		20	1
2013	XV de Novembro	Paulista	10	1	–		10	1
2014	Villa Nova	Mineiro	8	3	–		8	3
2014	Paraná Clube	Série B	6	1	–		6	1
2014	Atlético Paranaense	Série A	0	0	–		0	0
2015	FC Gifu	J2 League	34	8	2	1	36	9
2016	FC Gifu	J2 League	38	12	0	0	38	12
2017	Daegu FC	K League 1	19	7	0	0	19	7
2017	Busan IPark	K League 2	2	0	3	1	5	1
Career total			157	34	5	2	162	36
