= Park Hyun-beom =

South Korean footballer

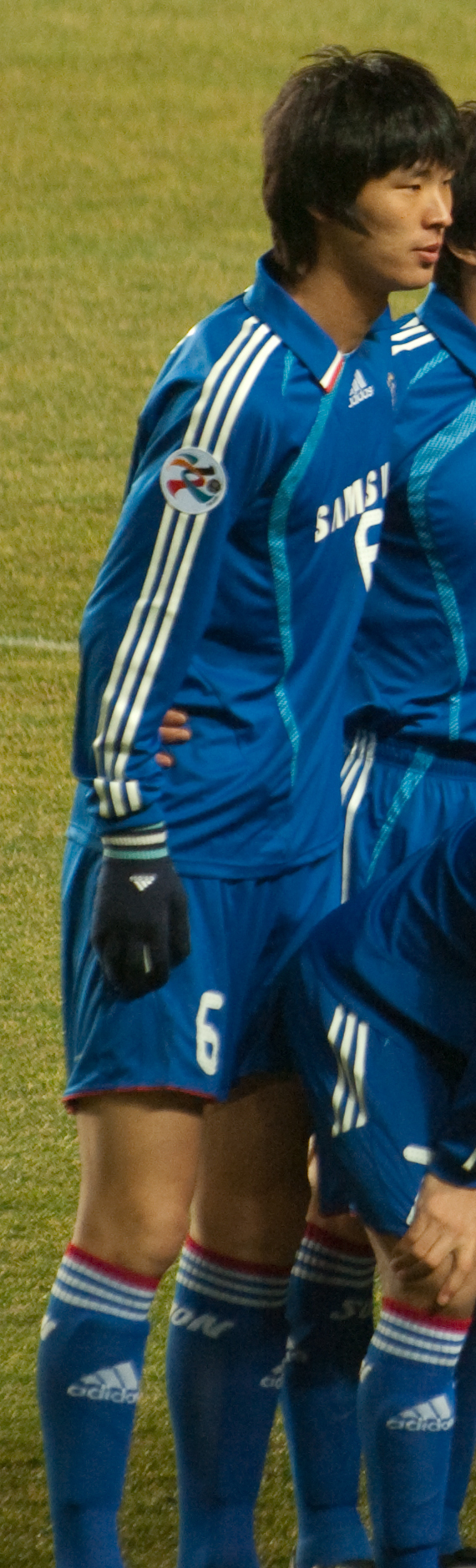

Personal information
- Date of birth: 7 May 1987 (age 39)
- Place of birth: Gwangju, South Korea
- Height: 1.94 m (6 ft 4 1/2 in)
- Position: Defensive midfielder

Youth career
- 2003–2005: Gwangju Kumho High School
- 2006–2007: Yonsei University

Senior career*
Years	Team	Apps	(Gls)
2008–2009	Suwon Samsung Bluewings	23	(2)
2009–2011	Jeju United	40	(9)
2011–2017	Suwon Samsung Bluewings	75	(4)
2014–2015	→ Ansan Police (army)	40	(1)
2019	Chonburi	5	(0)

International career^{‡}
2005–2007	South Korea U-20	21	(1)
2009–	South Korea	2	(0)
- * Club domestic league appearances and goals as of 11:06, 4 January 2018 (UTC) ‡ National team caps and goals as of 31 May 2012

- Park Hyun-beom
- Hangul: 박현범
- Hanja: 朴玹範
- RR: Bak Hyeonbeom
- MR: Pak Hyŏnbŏm

Park Hyun-beom (Korean: 박현범; born 7 May 1987) is a South Korean footballer.

Park Hyun-bem is accurate spelling.

== Club career ==
In 2008, Park started his professional career when he joined the Suwon Samsung Bluewings.

On 17 December 2009, he moved to Jeju United.

== International career ==
On 28 March 2009, Park Hyun-bem made his first international match against Iraq. After three years, he substituted against Spain on 31 May 2012.

== Club career statistics ==
As of 14 November 2011

Club performance			League		Cup		League Cup		Continental		Total	
Season	Club	League	Apps	Goals	Apps	Goals	Apps	Goals	Apps	Goals	Apps	Goals
South Korea			League		KFA Cup		League Cup		Asia		Total	
2008	Suwon Bluewings	K-League	11	1	0	0	7	1	-		18	2
2009	Suwon Bluewings	K-League	12	1	2	0	2	0	4	1	20	2
2010	Jeju United	K-League	22	3	3	0	4	0	-		29	3
2011	Jeju United	K-League	18	6	2	1	0	0	6	1	26	8
2011	Suwon Bluewings	K-League	11	0	3	1	0	0	4	1	18	2
Career total			74	11	10	2	13	1	14	3	111	17
