= Ma Chul-jun =

South Korean footballer

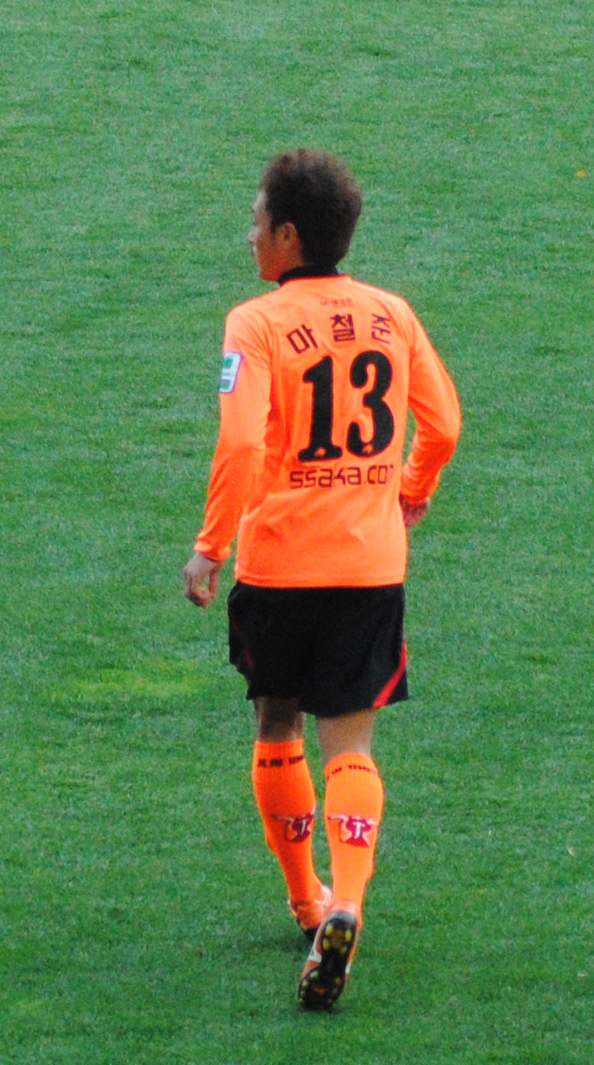

Personal information
- Date of birth: 16 November 1980 (age 45)
- Place of birth: South Korea
- Height: 1.80 m (5 ft 11 in)
- Positions: Full back; midfielder

Youth career
- 1996–1998: Pohang Jecheol High School
- 1999–2002: Kyung Hee University

Senior career*
Years	Team	Apps	(Gls)
2003	Gimpo Hallelujah	9	(0)
2004–2012	Bucheon SK / Jeju United	117	(1)
2007–2008	→ Gwangju Sangmu (military service)	30	(0)
2012	Jeonbuk Hyundai Motors	7	(0)
2013–2015	Gwangju FC	28	(1)
Korean name
Hangul	마철준
Hanja	馬哲俊
RR	Ma Cheoljun
MR	Ma Ch'ŏlchun
- * Club domestic league appearances and goals

Ma Chul-jun (Korean: 마철준; born 16 November 1980) is a South Korean former footballer and manager.

== Career statistics ==
As of 21 November 2011

Club performance			League		Cup		League Cup		Continental		Total	
Season	Club	League	Apps	Goals	Apps	Goals	Apps	Goals	Apps	Goals	Apps	Goals
South Korea			League		KFA Cup		League Cup		Asia		Total	
2003	Gimpo Hallelujah	K2 League	9	0			-		-		9	0
2004	Bucheon SK	K-League	14	0	5	0	8	1	-		27	1
2005	Bucheon SK	K-League	17	1	1	0	1	0	-		19	1
2006	Jeju United	K-League	25	0	0	0	8	0	-		33	0
2007	Gwangju Sangmu	K-League	20	0	1	0	5	0	-		26	0
2008	Gwangju Sangmu	K-League	10	0	1	0	6	0	-		17	0
2009	Jeju United	K-League	21	0	2	0	4	0	-		27	0
2010	Jeju United	K-League	25	0	3	0	4	0	-		32	0
2011	Jeju United	K-League	15	0	1	0	1	0	5	0	22	0
Career total			156	1	14	0	37	1	5	0	213	2
