= Fábio Lopes (footballer, born 1985) =

Brazilian footballer

Personal information
- Full name: Fábio Rogério Correa Lopes
- Date of birth: 24 May 1985 (age 41)
- Place of birth: São Luís, Brazil
- Height: 1.81 m (5 ft 11 in)
- Position: Striker

Senior career*
Years	Team	Apps	(Gls)
	Moto Club	14	(1)
2004–2006	Coritiba		
2007	Toledo		
2007	Santa Rita		
2008	Bragantino		
2008	CSA	2	(0)
2009–2010	ASA	14	(2)
2010	Daejeon Citizen	13	(5)
2010–2012	Icasa	22	(8)
2011	→ Cerezo Osaka (loan)	14	(1)
2012	→ Cruzeiro (loan)		
2013	Linense		
2014	Ratchaburi	10	(4)
2015	Sampaio	0	(0)
2015	Santa Rita	8	(2)
2016	Murici		
2017	Coruripe	5	(0)
2018–?	Maranhão	4	(0)
- * Club domestic league appearances and goals

Fábio Rogério Correa Lopes (born 24 May 1985) is a Brazilian former professional footballer who played as a striker.

== Career ==
Fabio Lopes made his debut for Cerezo Osaka on the 2nd Osaka derby of the 2011 J. League Division 1 season, which ended in a 1–1 draw.
