= Lee Hyun-ho =

South Korean footballer (born 1988)

Lee Hyun-Ho
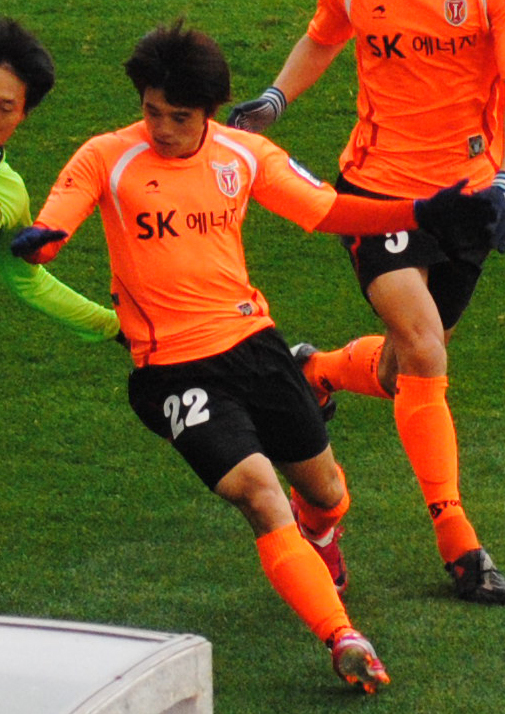

Personal information
- Date of birth: 29 November 1988 (age 37)
- Place of birth: South Korea
- Height: 1.70 m (5 ft 7 in)
- Position: Winger

Team information
- Current team: Daejeon Citizen
- Number: 22

Senior career*
Years	Team	Apps	(Gls)
2009	Ulsan Hyundai Mipo	11	(1)
2010–2011	Jeju United	51	(6)
2012–2013	Seongnam Ilhwa	16	(0)
2014	Jeju United	11	(0)
2015–	Daejeon Citizen	12	(0)
- * Club domestic league appearances and goals as of 15 December 2015

Lee Hyun-Ho (born 29 November 1988) is a South Korean football player who currently plays for Daejeon Citizen.
