= Kim Ho-jun (footballer) =

South Korean footballer (born 1984)

Kim Ho-Jun
Personal information
- Date of birth: 21 June 1984 (age 42)
- Place of birth: Gangwon, South Korea
- Height: 1.90 m (6 ft 3 in)
- Position: Goalkeeper

Team information
- Current team: Bucheon FC 1995
- Number: 1

Youth career
- Korea University

Senior career*
Years	Team	Apps	(Gls)
2005–2009	FC Seoul	50	(0)
2010–2017	Jeju United	167	(0)
2012–2013	→ Sangju Sangmu (army)	39	(0)
2018–2019	Gangwon FC	34	(0)
2020	Busan IPark	10	(0)
2021-	Bucheon FC 1995	4	(0)

International career
2000	South Korea U-17	0	(0)
2002–2003	South Korea U-20	0	(0)
2003–2004	South Korea U-23	0	(0)
- * Club domestic league appearances and goals as of 28 November 2020

- Kim Ho-jun
- Hangul: 김호준
- Hanja: 金鎬浚
- RR: Gim Hojun
- MR: Kim Hojun

Kim Ho-Jun (Korean: 김호준; born 21 June 1984) is a South Korean football player who plays for Bucheon FC 1995.

His debut was a match against Daejeon Citizen in 2005.

== Club career statistics ==
As of 29 November 2011

Club performance			League		Cup		League Cup		Continental		Total	
Season	Club	League	Apps	Goals	Apps	Goals	Apps	Goals	Apps	Goals	Apps	Goals
South Korea			League		KFA Cup		League Cup		Asia		Total	
2005	FC Seoul	K League 1	2	0	0	0	1	0	-		3	0
2006	FC Seoul	K League 1	0	0	0	0	0	0	-		0	0
2007	FC Seoul	K League 1	0	0	0	0	0	0	-		0	0
2008	FC Seoul	K League 1	24	0	0	0	7	0	-		31	0
2009	FC Seoul	K League 1	24	0	2	0	0	0	6	0	32	0
2010	Jeju United	K League 1	31	0	3	0	4	0	-		38	0
2011	Jeju United	K League 1	24	0	2	0	0	0	6	0	32	0
2012	Sangju Sangmu	K League 1							-			
Career total			105	0	7	0	12	0	12	0	136	0
