= Hong Jeong-ho =

South Korean footballer

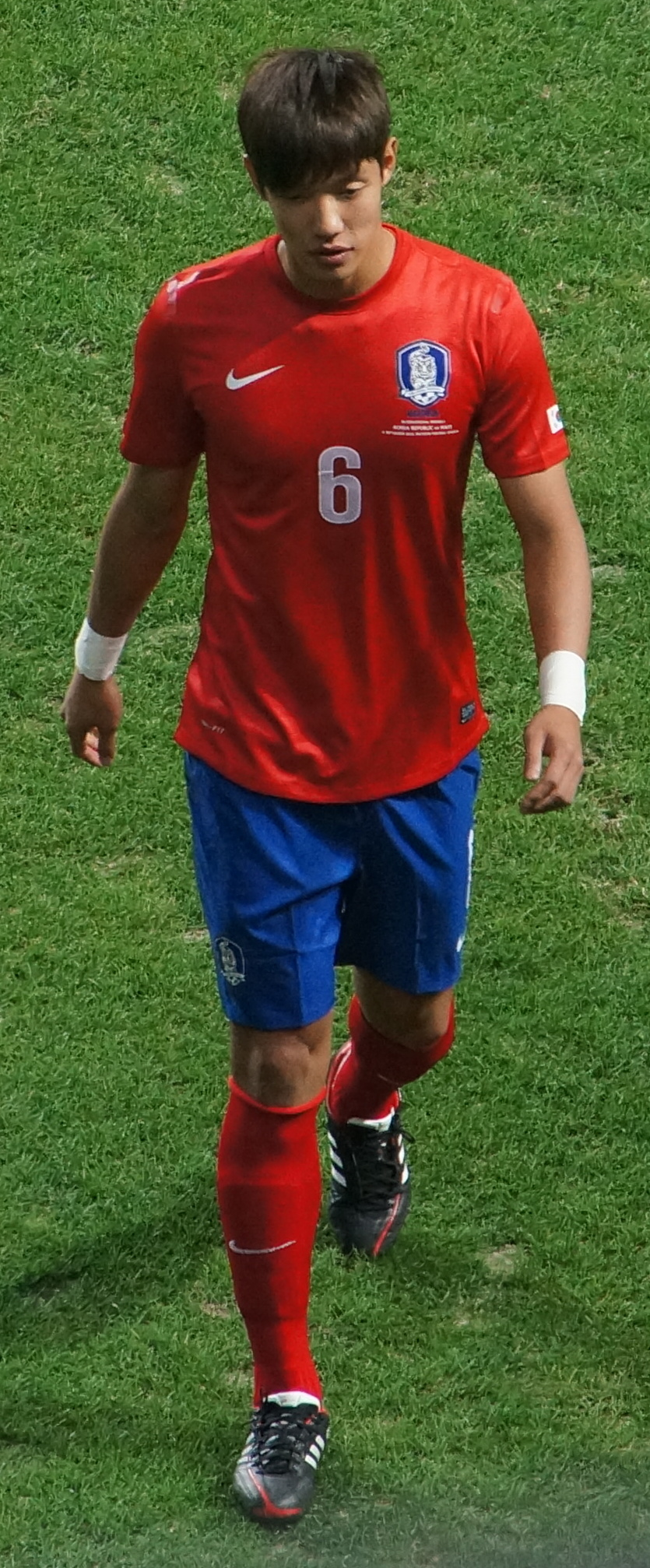
- Hong with South Korea in 2013

Personal information
- Full name: Hong Jeong-ho
- Date of birth: 12 August 1989 (age 37)
- Place of birth: Jeju City, Jeju, South Korea
- Height: 1.87 m (6 ft 2 in)
- Position: Centre-back

Team information
- Current team: Suwon Samsung Bluewings
- Number: 20

College career
Years	Team	Apps	(Gls)
2008–2009	Chosun University		

Senior career*
Years	Team	Apps	(Gls)
2010–2013	Jeju United	49	(2)
2013–2016	FC Augsburg	56	(2)
2016–2019	Jiangsu Suning	24	(3)
2018–2019	→ Jeonbuk Hyundai Motors (loan)	55	(3)
2020–2025	Jeonbuk Hyundai Motors	152	(4)
2023	Jeonbuk Hyundai Motors B	1	(0)
2026–	Suwon Samsung Bluewings	15	(0)

International career
2007–2009	South Korea U20	24	(2)
2010–2012	South Korea U23	16	(1)
2010–2018	South Korea	42	(2)
Medal record
Men's football
Representing South Korea
AFC Asian Cup
Bronze medal – third place	2011 Qatar
Asian Games
Bronze medal – third place	2010 Guangzhou
EAFF Championship
Bronze medal – third place	2013 South Korea
- * Club domestic league appearances and goals as of 5 August 2026

- Hong Jeong-ho
- Hangul: 홍정호
- Hanja: 洪正好
- RR: Hong Jeongho
- MR: Hong Chŏngho

Hong Jeong-ho (Korean: 홍정호; Korean pronunciation: [hoŋ.dʑʌŋ.ɦo] or [hoŋ] [tɕʌŋ.ɦo]; born 12 August 1989) is a South Korean footballer who plays for K League 2 club Suwon Samsung Bluewings as a centre-back. He also played for the South Korea national team at the 2011 AFC Asian Cup and the 2014 FIFA World Cup.

== Club career ==
=== Jeju United ===
Hong joined K League club Jeju United in November 2009 after quitting Chosun University. In his first professional season, he contributed to Jeju's second-place finish at the K League, being selected for the K League Best XI.

Hong was regarded as one of the best talents in South Korea at the time, but was dragged into a match-fixing scandal and an injury for the next two years. He was accused of being involved in the 2011 South Korean football match-fixing scandal, and was held out of the league during a two-month investigation. The investigation discovered that gangs had deposited ₩4 million unsolicited into his bank account, and he had later returned the funds. He was declared eligible for league matches after being cleared of wrongdoing. The next year, he injured his cruciate ligament in a K League match, having to take a rest during the second half of the season. He was the captain of the South Korea Olympic team in 2011 and 2012, but was absent from the 2012 Summer Olympics.

=== FC Augsburg ===
On 1 September 2013, Hong transferred to Bundesliga club FC Augsburg for a fee estimated around €2 million. He signed a four-year contract valid until 2017. On 5 April 2014, he helped the club keep a clean sheet in a 1–0 win over Bayern Munich, giving Bayern their first defeat at the 2013–14 Bundesliga. On 2 May 2015, he won 18 aerial duels in a 0–0 draw with 1. FC Köln, being selected for the weekly European XI by Whoscored.com. On 10 December, he scored his first goal for Augsburg in a 3–1 UEFA Europa League win over Partizan. In the next match on 13 December, he scored his first Bundesliga goal, contributing to a 2–1 win over Schalke 04.

=== Jiangsu Suning ===
Hong was not a main player early in his career at Augsburg, but gradually enhanced his status at the club for three years. On 14 July 2016, however, he moved to Chinese Super League club Jiangsu Suning, and his decision to leave the big league caused a controversy in South Korea. He explained that the transfer to China would not influence his ability as a national team player. Unlike his expectation, his mistakes increased in the 2018 FIFA World Cup qualifiers, and the controversy was intensified. To make matters worse, he was pushed to the bench at Jiangsu during the 2017 season.

=== Jeonbuk Hyundai Motors ===
On 13 January 2018, Hong was on loan to K League 1 club Jeonbuk Hyundai Motors. Although he failed to be called up for the 2018 FIFA World Cup, he won two consecutive K League 1 titles for the term of his loan deal. On 13 January 2020, Jeonbuk agreed to his permanent move to them. After the permanent switch, he added three league titles and three Korea Cup titles including two Doubles to his career. Especially, he received the K League Most Valuable Player Award when winning the league in 2021.

=== Suwon Samsung Bluewings ===
On 31 December 2025, Hong moved to K League 2 club Suwon Samsung Bluewings.

== Personal life ==
Hong's brother Hong Jeong-nam was also a footballer who played for Jeonbuk Hyundai Motors.

== Career statistics ==
=== Club ===
As of match played 8 August 2025

Appearances and goals by club, season and competition
Club	Season	League			National cup (Note: Includes Korean FA Cup, DFB-Pokal, Chinese FA Cup)		League cup		Continental		Other		Total	
Club	Season	Division	Apps	Goals	Apps	Goals	Apps	Goals	Apps	Goals	Apps	Goals	Apps	Goals
Jeju United	2010	K League	13	1	3	0	5 (Note: Appearances in Korean League Cup)	0	—		3 (Note: Appearances in K League Championship)	0	24	1
Jeju United	2011	K League	16	0	2	0	—		6 (Note: Appearances in AFC Champions League)	0	—		24	0
Jeju United	2012	K League	9	0	0	0	—		—		—		9	0
Jeju United	2013	K League 1	11	1	3	0	—		—		—		14	1
Jeju United	Total		49	2	8	0	5	0	6	0	3	0	71	2
FC Augsburg	2013–14	Bundesliga	16	0	0	0	—		—		—		16	0
FC Augsburg	2014–15	Bundesliga	17	0	0	0	—		—		—		17	0
FC Augsburg	2015–16	Bundesliga	23	2	3	0	—		2 (Note: Appearances in UEFA Europa League)	1	—		28	3
FC Augsburg	Total		56	2	3	0	—		2	1	—		61	3
Jiangsu Suning	2016	Chinese Super League	12	2	3	0	—		—		—		15	2
Jiangsu Suning	2017	Chinese Super League	12	1	1	0	—		6	2	1 (Note: Appearance in Chinese Super Cup)	0	20	3
Jiangsu Suning	Total		24	3	4	0	—		6	2	1	0	35	5
Jeonbuk Hyundai Motors (loan)	2018	K League 1	25	1	0	0	—		5	0	—		30	1
Jeonbuk Hyundai Motors (loan)	2019	K League 1	30	2	0	0	—		7	0	—		37	2
Jeonbuk Hyundai Motors (loan)	Total		55	3	0	0	—		12	0	—		67	3
Jeonbuk Hyundai Motors	2020	K League 1	22	1	3	0	—		5	0	—		30	1
Jeonbuk Hyundai Motors	2021	K League 1	36	2	0	0	—		6	1	—		42	3
Jeonbuk Hyundai Motors	2022	K League 1	19	1	2	0	—		5	0	—		26	1
Jeonbuk Hyundai Motors	2023	K League 1	22	0	2	0	—		3	1	—		27	1
Jeonbuk Hyundai Motors	2024	K League 1	19	0	0	0	—		3	0	2 (Note: Appearances in K League promotion-relegation play-offs)	0	24	0
Jeonbuk Hyundai Motors	2025	K League 1	20	0	2	0	—		0	0	—		22	0
Jeonbuk Hyundai Motors	Total		138	4	9	0	—		22	2	2	0	171	6
Jeonbuk Hyundai Motors B	2023	K4 League	1	0	—		—		—		—		1	0
Career total			323	14	24	0	5	0	48	5	6	0	406	19

=== International ===
Scores and results list South Korea's goal tally first, score column indicates score after each Hong goal.

List of international goals scored by Hong Jeong-ho
No.	Date	Venue	Opponent	Score	Result	Competition
1	15 November 2013	Seoul, South Korea	Switzerland	1–1	2–1	Friendly
2	28 March 2017	Seoul, South Korea	Syria	1–0	1–0	2018 FIFA World Cup qualification

== Honours ==
Jiangsu Suning

- Chinese FA Cup runner-up: 2016

Jeonbuk Hyundai Motors

- K League 1: 2018, 2019, 2020, 2021, 2025
- Korea Cup: 2020, 2022, 2025

South Korea U23

- Asian Games bronze medal: 2010

South Korea

- AFC Asian Cup third place: 2011

Individual

- K League 1 Best XI: 2010, 2019, 2020, 2021, 2025
- K League All-Star: 2012
- K League Player of the Month: November 2021
- K League 1 Most Valuable Player: 2021
