= Yang Se-keun =

South Korean footballer

Yang Se-Keun
Personal information
- Full name: Yang Se-Keun
- Date of birth: 8 October 1988 (age 38)
- Place of birth: South Korea
- Height: 1.86 m (6 ft 1 in)
- Position: Forward

Team information
- Current team: Mokpo City
- Number: 22

Senior career*
Years	Team	Apps	(Gls)
2009–2010	Jeju United	9	(0)
2011	Cheonan City	19	(2)
2012–	Mokpo City	20	(0)
- * Club domestic league appearances and goals as of 12 July 2013

Yang Se-Keun (Korean: 양세근; born 8 October 1988) is a South Korean football player who plays for Mokpo City in the National League.
