= Kang Joon-woo =

South Korean footballer (born 1982)

Kang Joon-Woo
Personal information
- Date of birth: 3 June 1982 (age 44)
- Place of birth: Jeju, South Korea
- Height: 1.88 m (6 ft 2 in)
- Position: Defender

Youth career
- University of Incheon

Senior career*
Years	Team	Apps	(Gls)
2006	Changwon City	10	(1)
2007–2016	Jeju United	108	(1)
2012–2013	→ FC Pocheon (loan)	51	(5)
2017–	FC Anyang	18	(2)
- * Club domestic league appearances and goals as of 1 January 2018

- Kang Joon-woo
- Hangul: 강준우
- Hanja: 康俊優
- RR: Gang Junu
- MR: Kang Chunu

Kang Joon-Woo (born 3 June 1982) is a South Korean footballer who plays as defender. He played for FC Pocheon due to the military service and it would be ended at 11 Nov, 2013. Now he is playing for FC Anyang.
