= Han Dong-jin =

South Korean footballer (born 1979)

Han Dong-Jin
Personal information
- Full name: Han Dong-Jin
- Date of birth: August 25, 1979 (age 47)
- Place of birth: Wonju, Gangwon, South Korea
- Height: 1.83 m (6 ft 0 in)
- Position: Goalkeeper

Team information
- Current team: Jeju United
- Number: 21

Youth career
- Sangji University

Senior career*
Years	Team	Apps	(Gls)
2002–2013	Bucheon SK / Jeju United	95	(0)
2005–2006	→ Gwangju Sangmu (military service)	13	(0)

International career
1999	South Korea U-20		
- * Club domestic league appearances and goals as of 7 December 2013

- Han Dong-jin
- Hangul: 한동진
- Hanja: 韓動鎭
- RR: Han Dongjin
- MR: Han Tongjin

Han Dong-Jin (born August 25, 1979) is a South Korean footballer. He currently plays for Jeju United.

== Club career statistics ==
Club performance			League		Cup		League Cup		Continental		Total	
Season	Club	League	Apps	Goals	Apps	Goals	Apps	Goals	Apps	Goals	Apps	Goals
South Korea			League		KFA Cup		League Cup		Asia		Total	
2002	Bucheon SK	K-League	9	0	?	?	0	0	-			
2003	Bucheon SK	K-League	31	0	4	0	-		-		35	0
2004	Bucheon SK	K-League	0	0	0	0	0	0	-		0	0
2005	Gwangju Sangmu Bulsajo	K-League	3	0	1	0	0	0	-		4	0
2006	Gwangju Sangmu Bulsajo	K-League	10	0	1	0	5	0	-		16	0
2007	Jeju United	K-League	6	0	0	0	0	0	-		6	0
2008	Jeju United	K-League	7	0	0	0	5	0	-		12	0
2009	Jeju United	K-League							-			
Total	South Korea		66	0			10	0	-			
Career total			66	0			10	0				
