= Lee Sang-ho (footballer, born 1981) =

South Korean footballer

Personal information
- Date of birth: 18 November 1981 (age 44)
- Place of birth: South Korea
- Height: 1.75 m (5 ft 9 in)
- Position: Defender

Team information
- Current team: PTT Rayong
- Number: 17

Youth career
- Dankook University

Senior career*
| Years | Team | Apps | (Gls) |
| 2006–2010 | Bucheon SK / Jeju United | 163 | (1) |
| 2011–2013 | Jeonnam Dragons | 27 | (0) |
| 2014 | Port F.C. | 24 | (0) |
| 2015– | PTT Rayong | 0 | (0) |

International career
| 2008 | South Korea | 1 | (0) |
- * Club domestic league appearances and goals as of 11 December 2013

- Lee Sang-ho
- Hangul: 이상호
- Hanja: 李尙浩
- RR: I Sangho
- MR: I Sangho

Lee Sang-ho (Korean: 이상호; Hanja: 李尙浩; born 18 November 1981) is a South Korean football coach and former player, He is the currently first-team coach of K League 1 club Jeju United.

== Biography ==
Lee Sang-ho was born in 1981 in South Korea.

== Career ==
In January 2019, Lee Sang Hoo to persib bandung Liga Gojek side Fc Seoul.
