= Kim Gwi-hwa =

South Korean footballer (born 1970)

Kim Gwi-Hwa 김귀화
Personal information
- Full name: Kim Gwi-Hwa
- Date of birth: 15 March 1970 (age 56)
- Place of birth: Changwon, Gyeongnam, South Korea
- Height: 1.79 m (5 ft 10 1/2 in)
- Position: Midfielder

Team information
- Current team: Geoje High School (manager)

Youth career
- Ajou University

Senior career*
Years	Team	Apps	(Gls)
1991–1997	Daewoo Royals; Busan Daewoo Royals	93	(9)
1995–1996	→ Sangmu (military service)		
1998–2000	Anyang LG Cheetahs	57	(2)
Total		150	(11)

International career
1988	Korea Replbulc U-20		
1991–1992	Korea Replbulc U-23	25	(6)
1992–1993	Korea Replbulc	1	(0)

Managerial career
- 2001–2004: Anyang LG Cheetahs / FC Seoul (Coach)
- 2007: Busan Sangmu
- 2008–2010: Gyeongnam FC (Coach)
- 2010: Gyeongnam FC (Caretaker manager)
- 2011: Daegu FC (Assistant manager)
- 2012–2016: Gimhae City
- 2019–2022: Busan TC
- 2023: FC Chungju (Assistant manager)
- 2024–: Geoje High School
- * Club domestic league appearances and goals as of 1 January 2024

- Kim Gwi-hwa
- Hangul: 김귀화
- Hanja: 金貴華
- RR: Gim Gwihwa
- MR: Kim Kwihwa

Kim Gwi-Hwa (Korean: 김귀화; born 15 March 1970) is a South Korean football manager and former player who play as a Midfielder. He currently manager of Geoje High School.

Kim was appointed assistant manager of Daegu FC on 4 January 2011.

After a season stint with Daegu, he was named as head coach of Gimhae FC in the Korean Second Division in November 2011.

Sporting positions
Preceded by Choi Yong-Soo	Anyang LG Cheetahs captain 2000.05–2000	Succeeded by Lee Sang-Hun
