= Júnior Santos (footballer, born 1985) =

Brazilian footballer (born 1985)

Personal information
- Full name: Natanael de Sousa Santos Júnior
- Date of birth: 25 December 1985 (age 40)
- Place of birth: Mortugaba, Brazil
- Height: 1.65 m (5 ft 5 in)
- Position: Attacking midfielder

Senior career*
Years	Team	Apps	(Gls)
2006–2007	CRB		
2008	Londrina		
2008	Cascavel		
2009	Santa Rita		
2009	Cascavel		
2010–2012	Jeju United	88	(40)
2013	Wuhan Zall	14	(0)
2013–2017	Suwon Samsung Bluewings	145	(55)
2018	Chapecoense	4	(0)
2020	CSE	6	(2)
Total		257	(97)
- * Club domestic league appearances and goals

Natanael de Souza Santos Junior (born 25 December 1985), simply known as Júnior Santos, is a Brazilian former footballer who played as striker. Júnior is from Mortugaba in the state of Bahia, Brazil.

== Club career ==
=== Jeju United ===
On 9 February 2010, Júnior joined Jeju United. In his first season with the Jeju, Júnior scored 12 league goals and had four assists and added four goals and an assist in the Pillage Cup.

=== Wuhan Zall ===
On 12 February 2013, Wuhan Zall's owner Yan Zhi announced that Júnior will join their team for Chinese Super League season 2013. After playing 14 league matches without scoring, he transferred to K League 1 side Suwon Samsung Bluewings on 13 July 2013.

== Career statistics ==
Appearances and goals by club, season and competition
Club	Season	League			State League		Cup		League Cup		Continental		Total	
Club	Season	Division	Apps	Goals	Apps	Goals	Apps	Goals	Apps	Goals	Apps	Goals	Apps	Goals
Jeju United	2010	K-League	24	12	—		4	2	4	2	—		32	16
Jeju United	2011	K-League	29	14	—		2	1	0	0	6 (Note: Appearances in AFC Champions League)	0	37	15
Jeju United	2012	K-League	35	14	—		4	1	—		—		39	15
Jeju United	Total		88	40	—		10	4	4	2	6	0	107	46
Wuhan Zall	2013	Chinese Super League	14	0	—		1	0	—		—		15	0
Suwon Samsung Bluewings	2013	K League Classic	19	8	—		—		—		—		19	8
Suwon Samsung Bluewings	2014	K League Classic	35	14	—		1	0	—		—		37	14
Suwon Samsung Bluewings	2015	K League Classic	29	12	—		0	0	—		3	0	32	12
Suwon Samsung Bluewings	2016	K League Classic	33	12	—		5	1	—		4	2	42	15
Suwon Samsung Bluewings	2017	K League Classic	29	9	—		4	3	—		5	1	38	13
Suwon Samsung Bluewings	Total		145	55	—		10	4	—		12	3	167	62
Chapecoense	2018	Série A	2	0	2	0	1	0	—		—		5	0
CSE	2020	Alagoano	—		6	2	—		—		—		6	2
Career total			249	95	8	2	22	8	4	2	18	3	301	110
