= Kang Min-hyuk (footballer) =

South Korean footballer

Kang Min-Hyuk
Personal information
- Date of birth: 10 July 1982 (age 44)
- Place of birth: Jeju, South Korea
- Height: 1.84 m (6 ft 0 in)
- Position: Defender

Senior career*
Years	Team	Apps	(Gls)
2005	Seongnam Ilhwa	0	(0)
2005–2006	Gyeongnam FC	25	(0)
2007–2011	Jeju United	58	(1)
2008–2009	→ Gwangju Sangmu (army)	39	(0)
2012–	Gyeongnam FC	68	(0)
- * Club domestic league appearances and goals as of 20 December 2015

- Kang Min-hyuk
- Hangul: 강민혁
- Hanja: 康珉赫
- RR: Gang Minhyeok
- MR: Kang Minhyŏk

Kang Min-Hyuk (Korean: 강민혁; born 10 July 1982) is a South Korean football defender who currently plays for Gyeongnam FC in the K-League. He previously played for Seongnam Ilhwa, Gyeongnam FC, Gwangju Sangmu and Jeju United.

On 25 October 2009, Kang Min-Hyuk completed 100 professional career appearances in a 0–0 draw away against Chunnam Dragons.

== Career statistics ==
As of 21 November 2011

Club performance			League		Cup		League Cup		Continental		Total	
Season	Club	League	Apps	Goals	Apps	Goals	Apps	Goals	Apps	Goals	Apps	Goals
South Korea			League		KFA Cup		League Cup		Asia		Total	
2005	Seongnam Ilhwa	K-League	0	0	0	0	0	0	-		0	0
2006	Gyeongnam FC	K-League	25	0	1	0	10	1	-		36	1
2007	Jeju United	K-League	15	1	0	0	3	0	-		18	1
2008	Gwangju Sangmu	K-League	14	0	0	0	5	0	-		16	0
2009	Gwangju Sangmu	K-League	25	0	0	0	2	0	-		27	0
2009	Jeju United	K-League	2	0	0	0	0	0	-		2	0
2010	Jeju United	K-League	24	0	3	0	5	0	-		32	0
2011	Jeju United	K-League	20	0	0	0	1	0	4	0	25	0
2012	Gyeongnam FC	K-League							-			
Career total			125	1	4	0	26	1	4	0	159	2
