= Lee In-sik =

South Korean footballer (born 1983)

Lee In-Sik
Personal information
- Date of birth: 14 February 1983 (age 43)
- Place of birth: South Korea
- Height: 1.88 m (6 ft 2 in)
- Position: Defender

Senior career*
Years	Team	Apps	(Gls)
2005–2007	Jeonbuk Hyundai Motors	2	(0)
2008	Gimhae City		
2009	Jeju United	2	(0)
2010	Cheonan City	12	(0)
2011	Jeju United	3	(0)
2013	B.I.T.	27	(0)
2014	Royal Thai Navy FC	27	(0)
- * Club domestic league appearances and goals

Lee In-Sik (Korean: 이인식; born 14 February 1983) is a South Korean football footballer. (formerly Jeonbuk Hyundai, Gimhae FC, Cheonan City FC and Jeju United).

In November 2009, he moved to Jeju United.
