= Kim Young-sin =

South Korean footballer (born 1986)

Kim Young-Sin
Personal information
- Date of birth: 28 February 1986 (age 40)
- Place of birth: South Korea
- Height: 1.75 m (5 ft 9 in)
- Position: Midfielder

Team information
- Current team: Gangwon FC

Senior career*
Years	Team	Apps	(Gls)
2006–2007	Jeonbuk Hyundai Motors	14	(0)
2008–2016	Jeju United	99	(5)
2012–2013	→ Sangju Sangmu (army)	32	(1)
2016	→ Busan IPark (loan)	20	(0)
2017	Seongnam FC	13	(13)
2018–	Gangwon FC	0	(0)

International career^{‡}
2004–2005	South Korea U-20	4	(0)
- * Club domestic league appearances and goals as of 5 January 2018 ‡ National team caps and goals as of 9 October 2009

Kim Young-Sin (Korean: 김영신; born 28 February 1986) is a South Korean football player who currently plays for Gangwon FC.
