= Eraldo (footballer) =

Brazilian footballer (born 1982)

Personal information
- Full name: Eraldo Anicio Gomes
- Date of birth: April 1, 1982 (age 44)
- Place of birth: Coronel Fabriciano, Brazil
- Height: 1.85 m (6 ft 1 in)
- Position: Striker

Senior career*
| Years | Team | Apps | (Gls) |
| 2002 | Inter de Bebedouro | | |
| 2003 | Estrela do Norte | | |
| 2003–2007 | Portimonense | | |
| 2004 | → São Bento (Loan) | | |
| 2005 | → Serra (Loan) | | |
| 2005 | → Villa Nova (Loan) | | |
| 2006 | → Cabofriense (Loan) | | |
| 2006 | → Ipatinga (Loan) | | |
| 2007–2009 | Cruzeiro | | |
| 2007 | → Caxias (Loan) | | |
| 2008 | → Tupi (Loan) | | |
| 2008 | → Paulista (Loan) | | |
| 2008 | → Marília (Loan) | | |
| 2009 | Bahia | | |
| 2009 | Villa Nova | | |
| 2010 | Democrata (GV) | | |
| 2010 | Jeju United FC | 6 | (1) |
| 2011 | Uberlândia | | |
| 2011 | Grêmio Prudente | 3 | (1) |
- * Club domestic league appearances and goals

Eraldo Anicio Gomes or simply Eraldo (born April 1, 1982, in Coronel Fabriciano), is a Brazilian striker.

== Contract ==
- Tupi (loan) 21 January 2008 to 5 May 2008
- Cruzeiro 1 December 2005 to 30 November 2008
