= 2010 K-League =

Sonata K League
- Season: 2010
- Dates: Regular season: 27 February – 7 November 2010; Championship: 20 November – 5 December 2010
- Champions: FC Seoul (4th title)
- Champions League: FC Seoul; Jeju United; Suwon Samsung Bluewings; Jeonbuk Hyundai Motors
- Matches: 210
- Goals: 604 (2.88 per match)
- Best Player: Kim Eun-jung
- Top goalscorer: Yoo Byung-soo (22 goals)
- Biggest home win: Seongnam 6–0 Incheon (14 March 2010)
- Biggest away win: Suwon 1–5 Jeonbuk (7 November 2010)
- Highest scoring: Busan 5–3 Jeonnam (29 August 2010)
- Longest winning run: 6 matches Jeju United
- Longest unbeaten run: 10 matches FC Seoul
- Longest losing run: 6 matches Suwon Samsung Bluewings
- Highest attendance: 60,747; Seoul 4–0 Seongnam (5 May 2010)
- Lowest attendance: 1,019; Gwangju 0–1 Jeonnam (3 November 2010)
- Average attendance: 10,941

The 2010 K League, officially known as Sonata K-League 2010, was the 28th season of the K League. It was sponsored by Hyundai Motor Company, and was held from 27 February to 5 December 2010.

The K League match-fixing scandal, the biggest incident in history of South Korean football, occurred in this season, and was revealed in 2011. 15 matches were fixed by 47 players, and they were banned for life from working in football.

== Teams ==
Locations of the 2009 K League clubs

=== General information ===
Club	Manager	City	Stadium	2009 season
Busan IPark	(South Korea) Hwang Sun-hong	Busan	Busan Asiad Stadium	12th place
Jeonnam Dragons	(South Korea) Park Hang-seo	Gwangyang	Gwangyang Stadium	4th place
Daegu FC	(South Korea) Lee Young-jin	Daegu	Daegu Stadium; Daegu Civil Stadium	15th place
Daejeon Citizen	(South Korea) Wang Sun-jae	Daejeon	Daejeon World Cup Stadium	9th place
FC Seoul	(Portugal) Nelo Vingada	Seoul	Seoul World Cup Stadium	5th place
Gangwon FC	(South Korea) Choi Soon-ho	Gangneung; Chuncheon	Gangneung Stadium; Chuncheon Stadium	13th place
Gwangju Sangmu	(South Korea) Lee Soo-chul	Gwangju	Gwangju World Cup Stadium	11th place
Gyeongnam FC	(South Korea) Kim Gwi-hwa	Changwon	Changwon Football Center	7th place
Incheon United	(South Korea) Huh Jung-moo	Incheon	Incheon Munhak Stadium	6th place
Jeju United	(South Korea) Park Kyung-hoon	Seogwipo	Jeju World Cup Stadium	14th place
Jeonbuk Hyundai Motors	(South Korea) Choi Kang-hee	Jeonju	Jeonju World Cup Stadium	Champions
Pohang Steelers	(South Korea) Park Chang-hyun	Pohang	Pohang Steel Yard	3rd place
Seongnam Ilhwa Chunma	(South Korea) Shin Tae-yong	Seongnam	Seongnam 2 Stadium	Runners-up
Suwon Samsung Bluewings	(South Korea) Yoon Sung-hyo	Suwon	Suwon World Cup Stadium	10th place
Ulsan Hyundai	(South Korea) Kim Ho-kon	Ulsan	Ulsan Munsu Football Stadium	8th place

=== Managerial changes ===
Team	Outgoing	Manner	Date	Incoming	Date	Table
FC Seoul	(Turkey) Şenol Güneş	End of contract	25 November 2009	(Portugal) Nelo Vingada	14 December 2009	Pre-season
Daegu FC	(South Korea) Byun Byung-joo	Resigned	8 December 2009	(South Korea) Lee Young-jin	22 December 2009	Pre-season
Pohang Steelers	(Brazil) Sérgio Farias	Signed for Al-Ahli	27 December 2009	(Brazil) Waldemar Lemos	3 January 2010	Pre-season
Pohang Steelers	(Brazil) Waldemar Lemos	Sacked	10 May 2010	(South Korea) Park Chang-hyun	10 May 2010	12th
Suwon Samsung Bluewings	(South Korea) Cha Bum-kun	Resigned	6 June 2010	(South Korea) Yoon Sung-hyo	15 June 2010	15th
Incheon United	(Serbia) Ilija Petković	Resigned	8 June 2010	(South Korea) Kim Bong-gil	24 June 2010	6th
Gyeongnam FC	(South Korea) Cho Kwang-rae	Signed for South Korea	28 July 2010	(South Korea) Kim Gwi-hwa	28 July 2010	5th
Incheon United	(South Korea) Kim Bong-gil	Caretaker	22 August 2010	(South Korea) Huh Jung-moo	22 August 2010	9th
Gwangju Sangmu	(South Korea) Lee Kang-jo	Resigned	31 October 2010	(South Korea) Lee Soo-chul	31 October 2010	15th

=== Foreign players ===
Club	Player 1	Player 2	Player 3	AFC player	Former player(s)
Busan IPark	(Brazil) Felipe Azevedo				(Brazil) Di Fábio (Brazil) Rômulo
Jeonnam Dragons	(Brazil) Adriano Chuva	(Brazil) Índio			
Daegu	(Argentina) Isaac Acosta	(Brazil) Léo Paulista			(Brazil) Anderson
Daejeon Citizen	(Brazil) Alexandre	(Brazil) Fábio Lopes	(Brazil) Zacarias		(Brazil) Válber
FC Seoul	(Brazil) Adilson	(Montenegro) Dejan Damjanović		(Uzbekistan) Server Djeparov	(Portugal) Ricardo Esteves
Gangwon	(Brazil) Renato Medeiros	(Croatia) Stipe Lapić	(North Macedonia) Blazhe Ilijoski	(China) Li Chunyu	
Gwangju Sangmu Bulsajo					
Gyeongnam FC	(Brazil) Camilo	(Brazil) Marcinho			(Brazil) Lúcio Curió (Brazil) Marcelo Brás (Ghana) Alex Asamoah
Incheon United	(Bosnia and Herzegovina) Samir Bekrić	(Brazil) Bruno Correa	(North Macedonia) Dušan Savić		(North Macedonia) Dragan Čadikovski (Serbia) Ognjen Koroman
Jeju United	(Brazil) Eraldo	(Brazil) Júnior Santos		(China) Yan Song	(Brazil) Léo Mineiro
Jeonbuk Hyundai Motors	(Brazil) Eninho	(Brazil) Luiz Henrique	(Croatia) Krunoslav Lovrek	(China) Feng Xiaoting	
Pohang Steelers	(Brazil) Almir	(Brazil) Mota	(Brazil) Zulu	(Japan) Kazunari Okayama	(Brazil) Alexandro
Seongnam Ilhwa Chunma	(Brazil) Fabrício Souza	(Colombia) Mauricio Molina	(Montenegro) Dženan Radončić	(Australia) Sasa Ognenovski	
Suwon Samsung Bluewings	(Brazil) José Mota	(Brazil) Márcio Diogo		(Japan) Naohiro Takahara	(Brazil) Juninho (Brazil) Reinaldo (China) Li Weifeng
Ulsan Hyundai	(Colombia) Carmelo Valencia	(Colombia) Julián Estiven Vélez	(Paraguay) José Ortigoza		

== Regular season ==
=== League table ===
Pos	Team	Pld	W	D	L	GF	GA	GD	Pts	Qualification
1	FC Seoul	28	20	2	6	58	26	+32	62	Qualification for the playoffs final
2	Jeju United	28	17	8	3	54	25	+29	59	Qualification for the playoffs semi-final
3	Jeonbuk Hyundai Motors	28	15	6	7	54	36	+18	51	Qualification for the playoffs first round
4	Ulsan Hyundai	28	15	5	8	47	30	+17	50	Qualification for the playoffs first round
5	Seongnam Ilhwa Chunma	28	13	9	6	46	26	+20	48	Qualification for the playoffs first round
6	Gyeongnam FC	28	13	9	6	41	32	+9	48	Qualification for the playoffs first round
7	Suwon Samsung Bluewings	28	12	5	11	39	44	−5	41	Qualification for the Champions League (Note: Qualified as champions of the FA Cup.)
8	Busan IPark	28	8	9	11	36	37	−1	33	
9	Pohang Steelers	28	8	9	11	39	48	−9	33	
10	Jeonnam Dragons	28	8	8	12	40	49	−9	32	
11	Incheon United	28	8	7	13	42	51	−9	31	
12	Gangwon FC	28	8	6	14	36	50	−14	30	
13	Daejeon Citizen	28	5	7	16	27	50	−23	22	
14	Gwangju Sangmu	28	3	10	15	17	43	−26	19	
15	Daegu FC	28	5	4	19	28	57	−29	19	

Source: K League (in Korean)
Rules for classification: 1) Points; 2) Goal difference; 3) Goals scored

=== Positions by matchday ===
Team ╲ Round	1	2	3	4	5	6	7	8	9	10	11	12	13	14	15	16	17	18	19	20	21	22	23	24	25	26	27	28	29	30
FC Seoul	1	1	3	6	2	2	2	1	3	4	1	4	3	3	1	4	5	5	5	2	2	2	2	2	2	2	2	2	1	1
Jeju United	5	5	5	2	3	5	6	5	4	6	4	2	1	1	3	1	2	2	1	1	1	1	1	1	1	1	1	1	2	2
Jeonbuk Hyundai Motors	3	3	1	1	5	4	5	4	6	5	7	8	6	4	2	2	3	3	4	4	4	5	6	6	5	5	4	3	3	3
Ulsan Hyundai	5	4	9	5	1	1	1	3	2	2	3	1	5	6	6	5	6	6	6	7	6	6	5	5	6	6	6	6	5	4
Seongnam Ilhwa Chunma	2	6	2	3	4	6	4	6	5	3	5	3	2	2	5	6	4	4	2	3	3	4	4	4	3	3	3	4	4	5
Gyeongnam FC	10	7	7	11	6	3	3	2	1	1	2	5	4	5	4	3	1	1	3	5	5	3	3	3	4	4	5	5	6	6
Suwon Samsung Bluewings	13	9	12	8	9	9	10	12	14	15	15	15	11	11	10	9	8	8	8	6	7	7	7	7	7	7	7	7	7	7
Busan IPark	10	12	11	7	8	8	7	7	7	7	6	7	7	7	7	7	7	7	7	8	8	8	8	8	8	8	8	8	8	8
Pohang Steelers	8	8	8	4	7	7	9	10	10	13	11	12	12	12	13	10	10	9	9	9	9	10	10	11	10	10	10	10	9	9
Incheon United	5	2	4	9	10	12	12	8	8	8	8	6	8	8	8	8	9	10	10	11	11	9	9	9	9	9	9	9	10	11
Jeonnam Dragons	10	11	6	10	11	13	13	13	15	11	9	10	10	9	9	11	11	11	11	10	10	11	11	10	11	11	11	11	11	10
Gangwon FC	15	15	14	14	13	14	14	15	12	10	12	13	14	15	15	15	13	13	12	12	12	12	12	12	12	12	12	12	12	12
Daejeon Citizen	14	14	13	13	15	15	15	14	11	14	13	11	13	13	14	13	14	14	14	15	14	13	13	13	13	13	13	13	13	13
Gwangju Sangmu	4	10	10	12	12	11	8	9	9	9	10	9	9	10	11	12	12	12	13	13	13	14	14	14	14	15	15	15	14	14
Daegu FC	9	13	15	15	14	10	11	11	13	12	14	14	15	14	12	14	15	15	15	14	15	15	15	15	15	14	14	14	15	15

Source: K League

=== Results ===
Home \ Away	BIP	JND	DGU	DJC	SEO	GWN	GWJ	GNM	ICU	JJU	JHM	PHS	SIC	SSB	USH
Busan IPark	—	5–3	0–2	1–1	3–0	1–1	2–0	1–2	2–1	0–1	1–0	4–2	0–0	0–1	0–2
Jeonnam Dragons	2–2	—	2–1	3–0	1–1	2–1	2–3	1–1	0–0	4–2	3–2	2–2	0–3	2–0	3–3
Daegu FC	2–1	0–3	—	1–3	2–3	2–2	1–2	1–1	1–4	0–3	0–1	0–2	2–2	1–3	1–2
Daejeon Citizen	2–0	1–0	1–2	—	2–5	1–2	3–0	0–3	0–2	1–3	0–4	0–1	0–1	1–1	1–5
FC Seoul	3–1	1–0	4–0	2–1	—	2–1	3–0	3–2	2–0	2–0	0–1	1–0	4–0	3–1	3–0
Gangwon FC	0–0	5–2	1–0	2–2	0–3	—	1–0	1–2	1–2	1–4	2–3	2–0	1–2	1–2	2–2
Gwangju Sangmu	1–1	0–1	0–3	1–1	0–2	1–0	—	1–1	1–1	0–0	0–1	1–1	0–2	1–1	1–2
Gyeongnam FC	0–1	1–1	1–0	1–0	1–0	1–1	1–0	—	3–2	1–1	3–2	3–1	2–2	2–1	0–1
Incheon United	1–1	1–0	1–1	3–3	1–0	1–3	2–0	2–2	—	2–3	3–2	4–0	1–4	2–3	1–2
Jeju United	1–0	2–1	1–0	2–0	1–1	5–0	4–0	3–2	0–0	—	2–2	1–1	1–1	2–1	2–1
Jeonbuk Hyundai Motors	2–1	3–1	4–0	3–2	1–0	1–3	0–0	1–1	3–2	1–1	—	3–2	1–1	3–1	1–2
Pohang Steelers	2–2	1–1	2–1	0–1	1–4	4–0	1–0	3–0	3–2	2–5	3–3	—	2–0	1–1	1–1
Seongnam Ilhwa Chunma	1–1	4–0	1–3	0–0	1–2	3–0	2–2	1–2	6–0	0–1	1–0	3–0	—	0–0	2–0
Suwon Samsung Bluewings	4–3	1–0	2–1	0–0	4–2	1–2	2–0	0–2	2–1	0–3	1–5	2–0	1–2	—	0–2
Ulsan Hyundai	0–2	3–0	5–0	2–0	1–2	1–0	2–2	1–0	3–0	1–0	0–1	1–1	0–1	2–3	—

Source: K League
Legend: Blue = home team win; Yellow = draw; Red = away team win.

== Championship playoffs ==
=== Bracket ===
First round
3	Jeonbuk Hyundai Motors	2
6	Gyeongnam FC	0
4	Ulsan Hyundai	1
5	Seongnam Ilhwa Chunma	3

Second round
Jeonbuk Hyundai Motors	1
Seongnam Ilhwa Chunma	0

Semifinal
2	Jeju United	1
Jeonbuk Hyundai Motors	0

Final
1	FC Seoul	2	2	4
Jeju United	2	1	3

=== Final table ===
Pos	Team	Qualification
1	FC Seoul (C)	Qualification for the Champions League
2	Jeju United	Qualification for the Champions League
3	Jeonbuk Hyundai Motors	Qualification for the Champions League
4	Seongnam Ilhwa Chunma	
5	Ulsan Hyundai	
6	Gyeongnam FC	

Source: RSSSF
(C) Champions

== Player statistics ==
=== Top scorers ===
Rank	Player	Club	Goals
1	(South Korea) Yoo Byung-soo	Incheon United	22
2	(Paraguay) José Ortigoza	Ulsan Hyundai	17
3	(Brazil) Eninho	Jeonbuk Hyundai Motors	15
4	(South Korea) Kim Young-hoo	Gangwon FC	13
4	(Brazil) Lúcio Curió	Gyeongnam FC	13
4	(South Korea) Kim Eun-jung	Jeju United	13
7	(Montenegro) Dejan Damjanovic	FC Seoul	12
7	(South Korea) Lee Dong-gook	Jeonbuk Hyundai Motors	12
9	(South Korea) Jung Jo-gook	FC Seoul	11
9	(Montenegro) Dženan Radončić	Seongnam Ilhwa Chunma	11

=== Top assist providers ===
Rank	Player	Club	Assists
1	(South Korea) Koo Ja-cheol	Jeju United	11
2	(South Korea) Kim Eun-jung	Jeju United	9
3	(South Korea) Yeom Ki-hun	Suwon Samsung Bluewings	8
4	(Montenegro) Dejan Damjanović	FC Seoul	7
4	(South Korea) Choi Tae-uk	FC Seoul; Jeonbuk Hyundai Motors	7
4	(Brazil) Lúcio Curió	Gyeongnam FC	7
4	(Colombia) Mauricio Molina	Seongnam Ilhwa Chunma	7
8	(South Korea) Park Hee-do	Busan IPark	6
8	(Brazil) Eninho	Jeonbuk Hyundai Motors	6
8	(South Korea) Choi Jae-soo	Ulsan Hyundai	6

== Awards ==
=== Main awards ===
The K League Players' Player of the Year was published by Korean edition of FourFourTwo in summer, and was not an official award of the K League, but 148 players participated in the selection process.

Award	Winner	Club
Most Valuable Player	(South Korea) Kim Eun-jung	Jeju United
Top goalscorer	(South Korea) Yoo Byung-soo	Incheon United
Top assist provider	(South Korea) Koo Ja-cheol	Jeju United
Rookie of the Year	(South Korea) Yoon Bit-garam	Gyeongnam FC
FANtastic Player	(South Korea) Koo Ja-cheol	Jeju United
Manager of the Year	(South Korea) Park Kyung-hoon	Jeju United
Special Award	(South Korea) Kim Yong-dae	FC Seoul
Special Award	(South Korea) Kim Byung-ji	Gyeongnam FC
Special Award	(South Korea) Back Min-chul	Daegu FC
Special Award	(South Korea) Yoo Byung-seop	—
Special Award	(South Korea) Ahn Sang-gi	—
Best Referee	(South Korea) Choi Myung-yong	—
Best Assistant Referee	(South Korea) Jung Hae-sang	—
Team of the Year	FC Seoul	
Fair Play Award	Gangwon FC	
Youth Team of the Year	Maetan High School (Suwon Samsung Bluewings)	
Players' Player of the Year	(Montenegro) Dejan Damjanović	FC Seoul

=== Best XI ===
Position	Winner	Club
Goalkeeper	(South Korea) Kim Yong-dae	FC Seoul
Defenders	(South Korea) Choi Hyo-jin	FC Seoul
Defenders	(Brazil) Adilson	FC Seoul
Defenders	(Australia) Saša Ognenovski	Seongnam Ilhwa Chunma
Defenders	(South Korea) Hong Jeong-ho	Jeju United
Midfielders	(South Korea) Koo Ja-cheol	Jeju United
Midfielders	(Colombia) Mauricio Molina	Seongnam Ilhwa Chunma
Midfielders	(Brazil) Eninho	Jeonbuk Hyundai Motors
Midfielders	(South Korea) Yoon Bit-garam	Gyeongnam FC
Forwards	(South Korea) Kim Eun-jung	Jeju United
Forwards	(Montenegro) Dejan Damjanović	FC Seoul

== Attendance ==
Team	Stadium	Matches	Highest	Lowest	Average
Busan IPark	Asiad Main Stadium	14			4,393
Jeonnam Dragons	Gwang-Yang Stadium	14			12,004
Daegu FC	Daegu Stadium; Daegu Civil Stadium	14			4,946
Daejeon Citizen	Daejeon World Cup Stadium	14			8,577
FC Seoul	Seoul World Cup Stadium	14			30,849
Gangwon FC	Gangneung Stadium; Chuncheon Stadium	14			9,537
Gwangju Sangmu	Gwangju World Cup Stadium	14			3,782
Gyeongnam FC	Changwon Football Center	14			12,501
Incheon United	Incheon Munhak Stadium	14			8,571
Jeju United	Jeju World Cup Stadium	14			5,404
Jeonbuk Hyundai Motors	Jeonju World Cup Stadium	14			14,300
Pohang Steelers	Pohang Steel Yard	14			11,174
Seongnam Ilhwa Chunma	Tancheon Sports Complex	14			4,129
Suwon Samsung Bluewings	Suwon World Cup Stadium	14			26,163
Ulsan Hyundai	Ulsan Munsu Football Stadium	14			7,786
Total		210			10,941

Source: K League (in Korean)

== See also ==
- 2010 in South Korean football
- 2010 K League Championship
- 2010 Korean League Cup
- 2010 Korean FA Cup
- 2011 South Korean football match-fixing scandal
