= 2010 FC Seoul season =

FC Seoul
2010 season
- Chairman: Huh Chang-soo
- Manager: Nelo Vingada
- K-League: Champions
- FA Cup: Round of 16
- League Cup: Winners
- Top goalscorer: League: Dejan (13); All: Dejan (19)
- Highest home attendance: 60,747 vs Seongnam (League, 5 May)
- Lowest home attendance: 1,195 vs Mokpo (FA Cup, 21 April)
- Average home league attendance: 32,576
Home colours	Away colours

The 2010 season is FC Seoul's 28th season in the K League Classic.

== Pre-season ==
- In Mokpo, South Korea: From 5 January 2010 to 27 January 2010
- In Gotemba, Japan: From 31 January 2010 to 17 February 2010

=== Pre-season match results ===
Type	Date	Opponents	Result	Score	Scorers	Notes
Practice matches during winter training spell in Gotenba, Japan	7 February 2010	(Japan) Hamamatsu University	W	7–0	(South Korea) Bang Seung-Hwan 1', (Montenegro) Dejan 46', 68', (South Korea) Lee Hyun-Seung 55', (South Korea) Jung Jo-Gook 64', 90', (South Korea) Koh Myong-Jin 65'	
Practice matches during winter training spell in Gotenba, Japan	10 February 2010	(Japan) Mito HollyHock	W	1–0	(South Korea) Ha Dae-Sung 50'(pen)	
Practice matches during winter training spell in Gotenba, Japan	11 February 2010	(Japan) Urawa Red Diamonds	W	1–0	(Montenegro) Dejan 6'	
Practice matches during winter training spell in Gotenba, Japan	13 February 2010	(Japan) Shonan Bellmare	D	2–2	(South Korea) Jung Jo-Gook ?', (South Korea) Ha Dae-Sung 35'	
Practice matches during winter training spell in Gotenba, Japan	16 February 2010	(Japan) Shonan Bellmare	W	2–1	(Montenegro) Dejan 49', (South Korea) Ha Dae-Sung 85'	

== Competitions ==
=== Overview ===
Competition	Starting round	Final position	Record							
Competition	Starting round	Final position	Pld	W	D	L	GF	GA	GD	Win %
K League	Matchday 1	Matchday 30					—			
FA Cup	Round of 32						—			
League Cup	Group stage						—			
Total			0	0	0	0	0	0	+0	—

Last updated: 31 December 2010
Source: Fixtures and Results at FC Seoul Official Website

=== K League ===
==== League table ====
Pos	Team	Pld	W	D	L	GF	GA	GD	Pts	Qualification
1	FC Seoul	28	20	2	6	58	26	+32	62	Qualification for the playoffs final
2	Jeju United	28	17	8	3	54	25	+29	59	Qualification for the playoffs semi-final
3	Jeonbuk Hyundai Motors	28	15	6	7	54	36	+18	51	Qualification for the playoffs first round
4	Ulsan Hyundai	28	15	5	8	47	30	+17	50	Qualification for the playoffs first round
5	Seongnam Ilhwa Chunma	28	13	9	6	46	26	+20	48	Qualification for the playoffs first round

Source: K League (in Korean)
Rules for classification: 1) Points; 2) Goal difference; 3) Goals scored

Pos	Team	Qualification
1	FC Seoul (C)	Qualification for the Champions League
2	Jeju United	Qualification for the Champions League
3	Jeonbuk Hyundai Motors	Qualification for the Champions League
4	Seongnam Ilhwa Chunma	
5	Ulsan Hyundai	
6	Gyeongnam FC	

Source: RSSSF
(C) Champions

==== Matches ====
Date	Opponents	H / A	Result F – A	Scorers	Attendance	League position
27 February	Daejeon Citizen	A	5–2	Dejan 5', Esteves 33', 45', Lee Seung-Ryul 75', Adilson 88'	15,664	1st
7 March	Gangwon FC	A	3–0	Adilson 46', Bang Seung-Hwan 68', 79'	9,828	1st
14 March	Jeonbuk Hyundai Motors	H	0–1		38,641	3rd
27 March	Pohang Steelers	H	1–0	Esteves 25'	22,963	2nd
4 April	Suwon Samsung Bluewings	H	3–1	Esteves 24', Jung Jo-Gook 27', Choi Hyo-Jin 32'	48,558	2nd
11 April	Daegu FC	A	3–2	Jung Jo-Gook 26', Lee Seung-Ryul 28', Ha Dae-Sung 67'	6,283	2nd
18 April	Ulsan Hyundai FC	H	3–0	Dejan 30', Adilson 90+3', Ha Dae-Sung 90+5'	31,646	1st
25 April	Gyeongnam FC	A	0–1		14,259	3rd
2 May	Busan I'Park	A	0–3		8,181	4th
5 May	Seongnam Ilhwa Chunma	H	4–0	Dejan 20', 69', 76', Lee Seung-Ryul 90+2'	60,747	1st
9 May	Incheon United	A	0–1		16,845	4th
17 July	Jeonnam Dragons	H	1–0	Go Yo-Han 65'	10,109	3rd
24 July	Gwangju Sangmu	A	2–0	Ha Dae-Sung 58', Jung Jo-Gook 77'	6,215	3rd
31 July	Jeju United	H	2–0	Dejan 15', 82'	23,521	1st
8 August	Jeonbuk Hyundai Motors	H	0–1		30,876	4th
21 August	Gangwon FC	H	2–1	Choi Tae-Uk 29', Jung Jo-Gook 66'	20,559	5th
28 August	Suwon Samsung Bluewings	A	2–4	Hyun Young-Min 52'(pen), Dejan 56'	42,377	5th
1 September	Pohang Steelers	A	4–1	Choi Tae-Uk 22', Jung Jo-Gook 43', Lee Seung-Ryul 54', Own goal 90+1'	13,223	3rd
4 September	Gwangju Sangmu	H	3–0	Kim Jin-Kyu 71', Dejan 79', Choi Hyo-Jin 90+3'	21,329	2nd
11 September	Daegu FC	H	4–0	Choi Tae-Uk 51', Jung Jo-Gook 55', Dejan 64', Lee Seung-Ryul 81'	21,114	2nd
25 September	Jeonnam Dragons	A	1–1	Dejan 78'	12,357	2nd
3 October	Incheon United	H	2–0	Lee Seung-Ryul 43', Djeparov 58'	32,537	2nd
9 October	Gyeongnam FC	H	3–2	Jung Jo-Gook 76', 84', Ha Dae-Sung 80'	31,122	2nd
17 October	Ulsan Hyundai FC	A	2–1	Ha Dae-Sung 28', Choi Tae-Uk 73'	9,014	2nd
27 October	Jeju United	A	1–1	Choi Tae-Uk 24'	6,792	2nd
31 October	Busan I'Park	H	3–1	Jung Jo-Gook 18', Hyun Young-Min 31', Choi Tae-Uk 80'	28,054	2nd
3 November	Seongnam Ilhwa Chunma	A	2–1	Lee Seung-Ryul 10', Jung Jo-Gook 27'	5,098	1st
7 November	Daejeon Citizen	H	2–1	Jung Jo-Gook 3', Kim Chi-Woo 87'	40,982	1st

==== K League Championship ====
Date	Round	Opponents	H / A	Result F – A	Scorers	Attendance
1 December	Final 1st leg	Jeju United	A	2–2	Dejan 13', Kim Chi-Woo 90+2'	18,528
5 December	Final 2nd leg	Jeju United	H	2–1	Jung Jo-Gook 27' (pen), Adilson 72'	56,759

=== League Cup ===
==== Group stage ====
Date	Opponents	H / A	Result F – A	Scorers	Attendance	Group position
23 May	Gwangju Sangmu	A	0–0		4,219	3rd
26 May	Seongnam Ilhwa Chunma	H	2–0	Bang Seung-Hwan 25', Dejan 60'	10,436	1st
29 May	Ulsan Hyundai FC	A	1–1	Bang Seung-Hwan 38'	4,017	1st
6 June	Jeju United FC	H	5–1	Dejan 9', 30', Ha Dae-Sung 73', 76', Choi Hyo-Jin 84'	18,703	1st

Pos	Team	Pld	W	D	L	GF	GA	GD	Pts	SEO	JJU	USH	SIC	GWJ
1	FC Seoul	4	2	2	0	8	2	+6	8	—	5–1	—	2–0	—
2	Jeju United	4	2	1	1	7	7	0	7	—	—	3–1	—	2–0
3	Ulsan Hyundai	4	1	2	1	7	7	0	5	1–1	—	—	—	2–0
4	Seongnam Ilhwa Chunma	4	0	3	1	5	7	−2	3	—	1–1	3–3	—	—
5	Gwangju Sangmu	4	0	2	2	1	5	−4	2	0–0	—	—	1–1	—

Source: RSSSF

==== Knockout stage ====
Date	Round	Opponents	H / A	Result F – A	Scorers	Attendance
14 July	Quarter-finals	Daegu FC	H	2–2 (AET, 5–3p)	Adi 22', Ha Dae-Sung 28'	7,581
28 July	Semi-finals	Suwon Samsung Bluewings	H	4–2 (AET)	Dejan 57', 110', Lee Seung-Ryul 82', 115'	21,036
25 August	Final	Jeonbuk Hyundai Motors	A	3–0	Dejan 47', Jung Jo-Gook 55', Lee Seung-Ryul 90+1'	15,891

=== FA Cup ===
Date	Round	Opponents	H / A	Result F – A	Scorers	Attendance
21 April	Round of 32	Mokpo City Government	H	1–1 (4–3p)	Hyun Young-Min 113'(pen)	1,195
21 July	Round of 16	Busan I'Park	A	1–2	Choi Hyo-Jin 42'	3,784

== Match reports and match highlights ==
Fixtures and Results at FC Seoul Official Website (in English)

== Season statistics ==
=== K League records ===
Season	Teams	Final Position	League Position	Pld	W	D	L	GF	GA	GD	Pts	Manager
2010	15	Champions	1st	28	20	2	6	58	26	+32	62	(Portugal) Nelo Vingada

==== K League Championship records ====
Season	Teams	Position	Pld	W	D	L	GF	GA	GD	PSO	Manager
2010	6	Champions	2	1	1	0	4	3	+1	N/A	(Portugal) Nelo Vingada

=== All competitions records ===
Seasoan	Teams	K League	Championship	League Cup	FA Cup	AFC Champions League	Manager
2010	15	1st	Champions	Winners	Round of 16	N/A	(Portugal) Nelo Vingada

=== Attendance records ===
Season	Season Total Att.	K League Total Att.	Regular season Average Att.	League Cup Average Att.	FA Cup Total / Average Att.	ACL Total / Average Att.	Friendly Match Att.	Att. Ranking	Notes
2010	547,592	546,397	32,576	14,439	1,195 / 1,195	N/A	N/A	K League Season; Total Att. 1st	K League Championship included

- Season total attendance is K League Regular Season, League Cup, FA Cup, AFC Champions League in the aggregate and friendly match attendance is not included.
- K League season total attendance is K League Regular Season and League Cup in the aggregate.

== Squad statistics ==
=== Goals ===
Pos	K League	League Cup	FA Cup	AFC Champions League	Total	Notes
1	(Montenegro) Dejan (13)	(Montenegro) Dejan (6)	(South Korea) Hyun Young-Min (1) (South Korea) Choi Hyo-Jin (1)	Did not qualify	(Montenegro) Dejan (19)	
2	(South Korea) Jung Jo-Gook (12)	(South Korea) Lee Seung-Yeoul (3)	N/A	Did not qualify	(South Korea) Jung Jo-Gook (13)	
3	(South Korea) Lee Seung-Yeoul (7)	(South Korea) Ha Dae-Sung (3)	No scorer	Did not qualify	(South Korea) Lee Seung-Yeoul (10)	
4	(South Korea) Choi Tae-Uk (6)	(South Korea) Bang Seung-Hwan (2)	No scorer	Did not qualify	(South Korea) Ha Dae-Sung (8)	
5	(South Korea) Ha Dae-Sung (5)	(South Korea) Jung Jo-Gook (1)	No scorer	Did not qualify	(South Korea) Choi Tae-Uk (6)	

=== Assists ===
Pos	K League	League Cup	Total	Notes
1	(Montenegro) Dejan (7)	(Montenegro) Dejan (3)	(Montenegro) Dejan (10)	
2	(Uzbekistan) Djeparov (6)	(South Korea) Kim Tae-Hwan (2)	(Uzbekistan) Djeparov (7)	
3	(South Korea) Lee Seung-Yeoul (5)	(Uzbekistan) Djeparov (1)	(South Korea) Lee Seung-Yeoul (6)	
4	(Portugal) Esteves (4)	(South Korea) Lee Seung-Yeoul (1) (South Korea) Lee Jong-min (1)	(Portugal) Esteves (5)	
5	(South Korea) Hyun Young-Min (4)	N/A	(South Korea) Hyun Young-Min (5)	

== Coaching staff ==
Position	Name	Notes
Manager	(Portugal) Nelo Vingada	
Assistant Manager	(South Korea) An Ik-Soo	
First Team Coach	(South Korea) Choi Yong-Soo	
Reserve Team Manager	(South Korea) Choi Jin-Han	
Reserve Team Coach	(South Korea) Kim Seong-Jae	
Goalkeeping Coach	(Portugal) Carvalho	
Fitness Coach	(Portugal) Costa	
U-18 Team Manager	(South Korea) Lee Young-Ik	
U-18 Team Coach	(South Korea) Lee Won-Jun	
U-18 Team Goalkeeping Coach	(South Korea) Weon Jong-Teok	
Technical Advisor	(South Korea) Kim Sung-Nam	
Technical Director & Chief Scout	(South Korea) Choi Gi-Bong	

== Players ==
=== Team squad ===
All players registered for the 2010 season are listed.

Note: Flags indicate national team as defined under FIFA eligibility rules; some limited exceptions apply. Players may hold more than one non-FIFA nationality.

No.	Pos.	Nation	Player
1	GK	KOR	Kim Yong-Dae
2	DF	KOR	Choi Hyo-Jin (Conscripted)
3	DF	KOR	Lee Gyu-Ro
4	DF	KOR	Yoon Hong-Chang
5	MF	POR	Ricardo Esteves (Out)
5	MF	KOR	Chun Je-Hun (Discharged)
6	DF	KOR	Kim Jin-Kyu (Vice-captain)
7	MF	KOR	Kim Chi-Woo (Conscripted)
8	DF	BRA	Adilson dos Santos
9	FW	KOR	Jung Jo-Gook
10	FW	MNE	Dejan Damjanović
11	FW	KOR	Bang Seung-Hwan
13	DF	KOR	Hyun Young-Min
14	MF	KOR	Kim Han-Yoon
15	DF	KOR	Park Yong-Ho (captain)
16	MF	KOR	Ha Dae-Sung
17	DF	KOR	Lee Jong-min (Conscripted)
18	MF	KOR	Go Yo-Han
19	DF	KOR	Lee Jung-Youl
20	MF	KOR	Han Tae-You
21	DF	KOR	Yeo Hyo-Jin (Out)
21	DF	KOR	Choi Won-Kwon (Discharged)
22	MF	KOR	Koh Myong-Jin
25	DF	KOR	Lee Yun-Pyo
26	MF	KOR	Moon Ki-Han
27	FW	KOR	Bae Hae-Min

No.	Pos.	Nation	Player
28	FW	KOR	Lee Seung-Yeoul
29	MF	KOR	Lee Hyun-Seung
30	MF	KOR	Jung Da-Hwon
31	GK	KOR	Kang Jae-Wook
32	FW	KOR	Kang Jung-Hun
33	MF	KOR	Ou Kyoung-Jun (Out)
33	MF	KOR	Choi Tae-Uk (In)
34	GK	KOR	Jo Su-Huk
35	MF	KOR	Choi Hyun-Tae
36	DF	KOR	Kim Dong-Woo
37	DF	KOR	Choi Hyun-Bin
38	MF	KOR	Choi Jong-Hoan
39	MF	KOR	Kim Tae-Hwan
40	GK	KOR	Han Il-Koo
41	FW	BRA	Lima (In & Out)
42	DF	KOR	Choi Won-Wook
43	DF	KOR	Lee Yoon-Ho
44	FW	KOR	Yoon Dong-Min
45	MF	KOR	Park Young-Jun
46	MF	KOR	Lee Kwang-Jin
47	FW	KOR	Jung Seung-Yong
48	DF	KOR	Song Seung-Ju
49	MF	KOR	Jeon Ho-Yeon
50	FW	KOR	Jung Sang-Ho
88	MF	UZB	Server Djeparov (In)

=== Out on loan & military service ===
Note: Flags indicate national team as defined under FIFA eligibility rules; some limited exceptions apply. Players may hold more than one non-FIFA nationality.

No.	Pos.	Nation	Player
—	FW	KOR	Ahn Sang-Hyun (to (South Korea) Gyeongnam FC until December 2010)
—	FW	KOR	Kim Hyun-Sung (to (South Korea) Daegu FC until December 2011)
—	DF	KOR	Yeo Hyo-Jin (to (Japan) Tochigi S.C. until December 2010)
—	MF	KOR	Ou Kyoung-Jun (to (South Korea) Daejeon Citizen until December 2010)

No.	Pos.	Nation	Player
—	DF	KOR	Choi Won-Kwon (to (South Korea) Gwangju Sangmu until October 2010 / Discharged)
—	MF	KOR	Chun Je-Hun (to (South Korea) Gwangju Sangmu until October 2010 / Discharged)

- In : Transferred from other teams in the middle of season.
- Out : Transferred to other teams in the middle of season.
- Discharged : Transferred from Gwangju Sangmu and Police FC for military service in the middle of season. (Registered in 2010 season)
- Conscripted : Transferred to Gwangju Sangmu and Police FC for military service after end of season.

== Transfers ==
=== In ===
#	Name	POS	Moving from	Mode	Window	Period	Fee	Notes
1	(South Korea) Lee Jung-Youl	DF	(South Korea) Jeonnam Dragons	Transfer	Winter (2009–12)		Undisclosed	
2	(South Korea) Bang Seung-Hwan	FW	(South Korea) Jeju United	Transfer	Winter; 2010-01-03)		Trade	Lee Sang-Hyup↔Bang Seung-Hwan
3	(South Korea) Hyun Young-Min	DF	(South Korea) Ulsan Hyundai	Transfer	Winter (2009–12-19)		Trade	Kim Chi-Gon↔Hyun Young-Min
4	(South Korea) Ha Dae-Sung	MF	(South Korea) Jeonbuk Hyundai Motors	Transfer	Winter (2010-01-03)		Trade	Kim Seung-Yong and Sim Woo-Yeon ↔ Ha Dae-Sung and Lee Hyun-Seung
5	(South Korea) Lee Hyun-Seung	MF	(South Korea) Jeonbuk Hyundai Motors	Transfer	Winter (2010-01-03)		Trade	Kim Seung-Yong and Sim Woo-Yeon ↔ Ha Dae-Sung and Lee Hyun-Seung
6	(South Korea) Kim Yong-Dae	GK	(South Korea) Seongnam Ilhwa Chunma	Transfer	Winter (2010-01-03)	3 years (2012-12-31)	$860,000	
7	(South Korea) Lee Yoon-Pyo	DF	(South Korea) Daejeon Citizen	Transfer	Winter (2010-01-03)		Undisclosed	
8	(South Korea) Choi Hyo-Jin	DF	(South Korea) Pohang Steelers	Free transfer (Contract ended)	Winter (2010-01-11)	4 years (2013-12-31)	N/A	Free agent
9	(Portugal) Ricardo Esteves	DF	(Greece) Asteras Tripolis	Transfer	Winter (2010-01-22)		Undisclosed	
10	(South Korea) Lee Kyu-Ro	DF	(South Korea) Jeonnam Dragons	Free transfer (Contract ended)	Winter (2010-02-18)	3 years (2012-12-31)	N/A	Free agent
11	(Uzbekistan) Server Djeparov	MF	(Uzbekistan) FC Bunyodkor	Loan	Summer (2010-07-26)	6 months (2010-12-31)	N/A	
12	(South Korea) Choi Tae-Uk	MF	(South Korea) Jeonbuk Hyundai Motors	Transfer	Summer (2010-07-27)	3 years 6 months (2013-12-31)	Undisclosed	
13	(Brazil) Lima	FW	(Brazil) Joinville	Loan	Summer (2010-07-28)	1 year (2011-07-27)	Undisclosed	
13	(South Korea) Choi Won-Kwon	DF	(South Korea) Gwangju Sangmu	Return from military service	N/A (2010-10-30)	N/A	N/A	
14	(South Korea) Chun Je-Hun	MF	(South Korea) Gwangju Sangmu	Return from military service	N/A (2010-10-30)	N/A	N/A	

==== Rookie Draft ====
#	Name	POS	Moving from	Mode	Notes
1	(South Korea) Lee Yoon-Ho	DF	(South Korea) Korea University	Youth system (After Univ.)	FC Seoul U-18 Team (2009 Draft)
2	(South Korea) Jung Seung-Yong	FW	(South Korea) Dongbuk High School	Youth system	FC Seoul U-18 Team
3	(South Korea) Song Seung-Ju	DF	(South Korea) Dongbuk High School	Youth system	FC Seoul U-18 Team
4	(South Korea) Lee Kwang-Jin	MF	(South Korea) Dongbuk High School	Youth system	FC Seoul U-18 Team
5	(South Korea) Cho Min-Woo	DF	(South Korea) Dongbuk High School	Youth system (Univ.)	FC Seoul U-18 Team
6	(South Korea) Kang Jung-Hun	FW	(South Korea) Konkuk University	Regular (1st)	
7	(South Korea) Choi Hyun-Tae	FW	(South Korea) Dong-A University	Regular (2nd)	
8	(South Korea) Kim Dong-Woo	DF	(South Korea) Chosun University	Regular (4th)	
9	(South Korea) Choi Hyun-Bin	DF	(South Korea) Chungbuk National University	Regular (5th)	
10	(South Korea) Kim Tae-Hwan	MF	(South Korea) Kumho High School	Regular (6th)	
11	(South Korea) Yoon Dong-Min	FW	(South Korea) Kyunghee University	Extra	
12	(South Korea) Jeon Ho-Yeon	MF	(South Korea) Dongbuk High School	Extra	
13	(South Korea) Choi Jong-Hoan	MF	(South Korea) Ulsan Hyundai Mipo Dockyard	Extra	
14	(South Korea) Jung Sang-Ho	FW	(South Korea) Sorabol College	Supplement	
15	(South Korea) Han Il-Koo	GK	(South Korea) Korea University	Supplement	
16	(South Korea) Choi Won-Wook	MF	(South Korea) Korea University	Supplement	

- (Univ.) means player who go to university then back to FC Seoul.
- (After Univ.) means player who is joined FC Seoul after entering university.

=== Out ===
#	Name	POS	Moving to	Mode	Window	Period	Fee	Notes
1	(South Korea) Ki Sung-Yueng	MF	(Scotland) Celtic FC	Transfer	Winter (2009–12-21)	4 years	£2,000,000	
2	(South Korea) Lee Sang-Hyup	FW	(South Korea) Jeju United	Transfer	Winter (2009–12-28)		Trade	Lee Sang-Hyup↔Bang Seung-Hwan
3	(South Korea) Kim Chi-Gon	DF	(South Korea) Ulsan Hyundai	Transfer	Winter (2009–12-29)		Trade	Kim Chi-Gon↔Hyun Young-min
4	(South Korea) Kim Seung-Yong	FW	(South Korea) Jeonbuk Hyundai Motors	Transfer	Winter (2009–12-31)		Trade	Kim Seung-Yong and Sim Woo-Yeon ↔ Ha Dae-Sung and Lee Hyun-Seung
5	(South Korea) Sim Woo-Yeon	FW	(South Korea) Jeonbuk Hyundai Motors	Transfer	Winter (2009–12-31)		Trade	Kim Seung-Yong and Sim Woo-Yeon ↔ Ha Dae-Sung and Lee Hyun-Seung
6	(South Korea) Ahn Tae-Eun	DF	(South Korea) Pohang Steelers	Transfer	Winter (2010-01-11)		Undisclosed	
7	(South Korea) Jeong Hyung-Joon	FW	(South Korea) Daejeon Citizen	Transfer	Winter		Undisclosed	
8	(Brazil) Anderson	FW	(Croatia) HNK Hajduk Split	Free transfer (Contract terminated)	Winter		Free	
9	(South Korea) Kim Ui-Beom	FW	(South Korea) Jeonbuk Hyundai Motors	Free transfer (Contract terminated)	Winter		Free	
10	(South Korea) Choi Young-Il	FW	(South Korea) Ulsan Hyundai Mipo Dockyard	Transfer	Winter		Undisclosed	
11	(South Korea) Choi Jae-Soo	DF	(South Korea) Ulsan Hyundai	Transfer	Winter (2010-01-26)		Undisclosed	
12	(South Korea) Kim Ho-Jun	GK	(South Korea) Jeju United	Transfer	Winter (2010-02-24)		$800,000	
13	(South Korea) Jung Sung-Ho	DF	Unknown	Contract terminated	Winter			
14	(South Korea) Lee Hwa-Seob	MF	Unknown	Contract terminated	Winter			
15	(South Korea) An Jung-Gu	MF	Unknown	Contract terminated	Winter			
16	(South Korea) Seo Seung-Hoon	DF	Unknown	Contract terminated	Winter			
17	(South Korea) Choi Jae-Woong	MF	Unknown	Contract terminated	Winter			
18	(South Korea) Cho Beom-Seok	MF	Unknown	Contract terminated	Winter			
19	(South Korea) Kang Myung-Chul	MF	Unknown	Contract terminated	Winter			
20	(South Korea) Park Dong-Suk	GK		Retirement (Contract terminated)	Winter			
21	(Portugal) Ricardo Esteves	MF	(Portugal) C.S. Marítimo	Free transfer (Contract terminated)	Summer	Undisclosed	Free	
22	(Brazil) Lima	FW	(Brazil) Joinville	Loan returned	Middle of season (2010-09-??)			

==== Loan & Military service ====
#	Name	POS	Moving to	Window	Period	Fee	Notes
1	(South Korea) Kim Hyun-Sung	FW	(South Korea) Daegu FC	Winter (2010-01-05)	2 years	Free	
2	(South Korea) Yeo Hyo-Jin	DF	(Japan) Tochigi S.C.	Winter (2010-03-05)	1 year	Undisclosed	
3	(South Korea) Ou Kyoung-Jun	FW	(South Korea) Daejeon Citizen	Winter (2010-07-12)	6 months	Free	

== Technical report ==
=== Starting 11 & Formation ===
This section shows the most used players for each position considering a 4-4-2 formation.

No.	Pos.	Nat.	Name	MS	Notes
1	GK	(South Korea)	Kim Yong-Dae		
2	DF	(South Korea)	Choi Hyo-Jin		
6	DF	(South Korea)	Kim Jin-Kyu		
8	DF	(Brazil)	Adilson		
13	DF	(South Korea)	Hyun Young-Min		
33	MF	(South Korea)	Choi Tae-Uk		
16	MF	(South Korea)	Ha Dae-Sung		
88	MF	(Uzbekistan)	Djeparov		
28	MF	(South Korea)	Lee Seung-Yeoul		
9	FW	(South Korea)	Jung Jo-Gook		
10	FW	(Montenegro)	Dejan		

Source: Squad stats and Start formations.
Only competitive matches.
Using the most used start formation.
Ordered by position on pitch (from back right to front left).

=== Substitutes ===
No.	Pos.	Nat.	Name	MS	Notes
34	GK	(South Korea)	Jo Su-Huk		
15	DF	(South Korea)	Park Yong-Ho		
7	MF	(South Korea)	Kim Chi-Woo		
14	MF	(South Korea)	Kim Han-Yoon		
35	MF	(South Korea)	Choi Hyun-Tae		
39	MF	(South Korea)	Kim Tae-Hwan		
11	FW	(South Korea)	Bang Seung-Hwan		

Source: Squad stats and Start formations.
Only competitive matches.
Using the most used start formation.
Ordered by position on pitch (from back right to front left).

== See also ==
- FC Seoul
