= 2011 FC Seoul season =

FC Seoul
2011 season
- Chairman: Huh Chang-soo
- Manager: Hwangbo Kwan (−26 April); Choi Yong-soo (26 April–)
- K-League: 5th
- FA Cup: Quarter-finals
- League Cup: Quarter-finals
- Champions League: Quarter-finals
- Top goalscorer: League: Dejan (24); All: Dejan (32)
- Highest home attendance: 51,606 vs Suwon (League, 6 March)
- Lowest home attendance: 3,733 vs Yongin (FA Cup, 18 May)
- Average home league attendance: 28,002
Home colours	Away colours

The 2011 season is FC Seoul's 28th season in the K League Classic.

== Pre-season ==
- In Namhae, South Korea: From 10 to 31 January 2011
- In Kagoshima, Japan: From 6 to 18 February 2011

=== Pre-season match results ===
Type	Date	Opponents	Result	Score	Scorers	Notes
Practice matches during winter training spell in Kagoshima, Japan	8 February 2011	(Japan) Vissel Kobe	W	4–2	(South Korea) Lee Seung-Yeoul 03', (South Korea) Bang Seung-Hwan 25', (Colombia) Molina ?', (South Korea) Lee Jae-An ?'	
Practice matches during winter training spell in Kagoshima, Japan	11 February 2011	(Japan) Kyoto Sanga	W	3–1	(Brazil) Adilson 44', (Montenegro) Dejan 50', (South Korea) Go Yo-Han 120'	
Practice matches during winter training spell in Kagoshima, Japan	13 February 2011	(Japan) Kataller Toyama	L	1–2	(South Korea) Lee Jae-An ?'	
Practice matches during winter training spell in Kagoshima, Japan	15 February 2011	(Japan) Fagiano Okayama	W	1–0	(Uzbekistan) Djeparov 38'	
Practice matches during winter training spell in Kagoshima, Japan	17 February 2011	(Japan) Sanfrecce Hiroshima	L	1–3	(Montenegro) Dejan 86'	

== Competitions ==
=== K League ===
==== League table ====
Pos	Team	Pld	W	D	L	GF	GA	GD	Pts	Qualification
1	Jeonbuk Hyundai Motors	30	18	9	3	67	32	+35	63	Qualification for the K League playoffs final
2	Pohang Steelers	30	17	8	5	59	33	+26	59	Qualification for the K League playoffs semi-final
3	FC Seoul	30	16	7	7	56	38	+18	55	Qualification for the K League playoffs first round
4	Suwon Samsung Bluewings	30	17	4	9	51	33	+18	55	Qualification for the K League playoffs first round
5	Busan IPark	30	13	7	10	49	43	+6	46	Qualification for the K League playoffs first round

Source: K League
Rules for classification: 1) Points; 2) Goal difference; 3) Goals scored

Pos	Team	Qualification
1	Jeonbuk Hyundai Motors (C)	Qualification for the Champions League group stage
2	Ulsan Hyundai	Qualification for the Champions League group stage
3	Pohang Steelers	Qualification for the Champions League playoff round
4	Suwon Samsung Bluewings	
5	FC Seoul	
6	Busan IPark	

Source: RSSSF
(C) Champions

==== Results summary ====
Overall								Home						Away					
Pld	W	D	L	GF	GA	GD	Pts	W	D	L	GF	GA	GD	W	D	L	GF	GA	GD
30	16	7	7	56	38	+18	55	10	3	2	34	19	+15	6	4	5	22	19	+3

==== Results by round ====
Round	1	2	3	4	5	6	7	8	9	10	11	12	13	14	15	16	17	18	19	20	21	22	23	24	25	26	27	28	29	30
Ground	H	A	A	H	A	H	A	H	A	H	H	A	H	A	H	A	H	A	H	A	H	A	H	A	H	H	A	A	H	A
Result	L	D	L	W	D	D	L	W	W	W	L	L	D	W	D	D	W	W	W	W	W	W	W	L	W	W	L	D	W	W
Position	15	13	15	11	12	12	14	13	10	7	9	11	12	9	9	10	6	7	6	4	3	3	3	3	3	3	4	4	4	3

Updated to match(es) played on 30 October 2011. Source: League Fixtures and Results
A = Away; H = Home; W = Win; D = Draw; L = Loss

==== Matches ====
Date Round	Home	Score	Away	Location

6 March 1	FC Seoul	0–2	Suwon Samsung Bluewings	Mapo-gu, Seoul
14:00 UTC+9		Report	Geynrikh 40'; Oh Jang-Eun 60'	Stadium: Seoul World Cup Stadium; Attendance: 51,606; Referee: Choi Myung-Yong

12 March 2	Daejeon Citizen	1–1	FC Seoul	Yuseong-gu, Daejeon
15:00 UTC+9	Wagner 13'	Report	Hwang Jae-Hun 37' (o.g.)	Stadium: Daejeon World Cup Stadium; Attendance: 32,340; Referee: Lee Sam-Ho

20 March 3	Jeonnam Dragons	3–0	FC Seoul	Gwangyang, Jeonnam
15:00 UTC+9	Javier Reina 35' (pen.); Lee Jong-Ho 76'; Kim Young-Wook 90'	Report		Stadium: Gwangyang Stadium; Attendance: 3,622; Referee: Lee Sang-Yong

2 April 4	FC Seoul	3–1	Jeonbuk Hyundai Motors	Mapo-gu, Seoul
17:00 UTC+9	Dejan 20', 85'; Molina 22'	Report	Lee Dong-Gook 80'	Stadium: Seoul World Cup Stadium; Attendance: 27,406; Referee: Yoo Seon-Ho

10 April 5	Busan I'Park	1–1	FC Seoul	Yeonje-gu, Busan
15:00 UTC+9	Yang Dong-Hyun 73'	Report	Ko Yo-Han 36'	Stadium: Busan Asiad Stadium; Attendance: 5,208; Referee: Ko Keum-Bok

16 April 6	FC Seoul	1–1	Ulsan Hyundai FC	Mapo-gu, Seoul
17:00 UTC+9	Ha Dae-Sung 83'	Report	Kwak Tae-Hwi 64'	Stadium: Seoul World Cup Stadium; Attendance: 28,418; Referee: Lee Sam-Ho

24 April 7	Gwangju	1–0	FC Seoul	Seo-gu, Gwangju
15:00 UTC+9	João Paulo 34'; Kim Soo-Beom (yellow card) 55' (yellow-red card) 81'	Report		Stadium: Gwangju World Cup Stadium; Attendance: 4,127; Referee: Kim Dong-Jin

30 April 8	FC Seoul	2–1	Jeju United	Mapo-gu, Seoul
17:00 UTC+9	Park Yong-Ho 57'; Koh Myong-Jin 81'	Report	Park Hyun-Beom 36'	Stadium: Seoul World Cup Stadium; Attendance: 9,797; Referee: Choi Myung-Yong

8 May 9	Sangju Sangmu Phoenix	3–4	FC Seoul	Sangju, Gyeongbuk
19:30 UTC+9	Park Yong-Ho 18' (o.g.); Choi Hyo-Jin 46'; Kim Jung-Woo 74'; Kim Young-Sam (yellow card) 56' (yellow-red card) 82'	Report	Dejan 9', 35', 73'; Hyun Young-Min 87'	Stadium: Sangju Stadium; Attendance: 9,170; Referee: Lee Sang-Yong

15 May 10	FC Seoul	3–1	Gyeongnam	Mapo-gu, Seoul
15:00 UTC+9	Dejan 9'; Ko Yo-Han 69', 90'	Report	Kim In-Han 43'	Stadium: Seoul World Cup Stadium; Attendance: 26,008; Referee: Kim Seong-Ho

21 May 11	FC Seoul	0–2	Daegu	Mapo-gu, Seoul
20:00 UTC+9		Report	Lee Sang-Duk 44'; Ahn Seong-Min 67'	Stadium: Seoul World Cup Stadium; Attendance: 14,817; Referee: Mun Jin-Hee

29 May 12	Seongnam Ilhwa Chunma	2–0	FC Seoul	Seongnam, Gyeonggi
17:00 UTC+9	Cho Dong-Geon 75'; Kim Jin-Yong 87'	Report		Stadium: Tancheon Sports Complex; Attendance: 10,314; Referee: Lee Sam-Ho

11 June 13	FC Seoul	1–1	Pohang Steelers	Mapo-gu, Seoul
20:00 UTC+9	Damjanović 8'	Report	Hwang Jin-Sung 46'	Stadium: Seoul World Cup Stadium; Attendance: 44,358; Referee: Choi Kwangbo

18 June 14	Gangwon	0–2	FC Seoul	Gangneung, Gangwon
19:00 UTC+9		Report	Ha Dae-Sung 23'; Molina 45'	Stadium: Gangneung Stadium; Attendance: 11,347; Referee: Lim Wontaek

25 June 15	FC Seoul	1–1	Incheon United	Mapo-gu, Seoul
20:00 UTC+9	Yeo Hyo-Jin (yellow card) 15' (yellow-red card) 73'; Damjanović 40'	Report	Han Kyo-Won 37'; Jang Won-Seok (yellow card) 71' (yellow-red card) 75'	Stadium: Seoul World Cup Stadium; Attendance: 15,315; Referee: Choi Kwangbo

3 July 16	Jeonbuk Hyundai Motors	2–2	FC Seoul	Jeonju, Jeonbuk
19:00 UTC+9	Eninho 29' (pen.) (yellow card) 17' (yellow-red card) 30'; Lee Seung-Hyun 45+1'; Lovrek (yellow card) 75' (yellow-red card) 78'	Report	Kang Jung-Hun 80'; Damjanović 81'	Stadium: Jeonju World Cup Stadium; Attendance: 15,879; Referee: Choi Myung-Yong

9 July 17	FC Seoul	3–2	Sangju Sangmu Phoenix	Mapo-gu, Seoul
20:00 UTC+9	Damjanović 54', 65'; Bang Seung-Hwan 90+3'	Report	Kim Jung-Woo 33' (pen.); Kim Min-Soo 84'	Stadium: Seoul World Cup Stadium; Attendance: 28,034; Referee: Kim Dong-Jin

17 July 18	Pohang Steelers	1–2	FC Seoul	Pohang, Gyeongbuk
19:00 UTC+9	Ko Moo-Yeol 33'	Report	Damjanović 7', 23'	Stadium: Steelyard Stadium; Attendance: 18,115; Referee: Choi Kwang-Bo

23 July 19	FC Seoul	4–1	Gwangju	Mapo-gu, Seoul
20:00 UTC+9	Damjanović 5', 21'; Choi Jong-hoan 31'; Molina 41'	Report	Kim Dong-Sub 69'	Stadium: Seoul World Cup Stadium; Attendance: 21,124; Referee: Ko Keum-Bok

6 August 20	Ulsan Hyundai	1–2	FC Seoul	Nam-gu, Ulsan
19:00 UTC+9	Kang Min-Soo 77'	Report	Choi Hyun-Tae 7'; Koh Myong-Jin 75'	Stadium: Munsu Cup Stadium; Attendance: 12,107; Referee: Lee Sam-Ho

13 August 21	FC Seoul	1–0	Jeonnam Dragons	Mapo-gu, Seoul
20:00 UTC+9	Molina 90+3'	Report		Stadium: Seoul World Cup Stadium; Attendance: 19,566; Referee: Choi Kwang-Bo

20 August 22	Jeju United	0–3	FC Seoul	Seogwipo, Jeju
19:00 UTC+9		Report	Damjanović 41', 87'; Ha Dae-Sung 74'	Stadium: Jeju World Cup Stadium; Attendance: 12,775; Referee: Lee Sang-Yong

27 August 23	FC Seoul	6–3	Gangwon	Mapo-gu, Seoul
20:00 UTC+9	Molina 9', 58', 81'; Damjanović 18', 47'; Lee Seung-Yeoul 68'	Report	Yoon Jun-Ha 72'; Seo Dong-Hyun 83' (pen.); Kim Jin-Yong 90'	Stadium: Seoul World Cup Stadium; Attendance: 23,921; Referee: Hong Jin-Ho

9 September 24	Daegu	2–1	FC Seoul	Buk-gu, Daegu
19:00 UTC+9	Kim Hyun-Sung 31', 34'	Report	Bang Seung-Hwan 53'	Stadium: Daegu Civil Stadium; Attendance: 5,612; Referee: Ahn Yong-Hee

18 September 25	FC Seoul	2–1	Busan I'Park	Mapo-gu, Seoul
17:00 UTC+9	Kim Dong-Jin 63'; Kang Jung-Hun 89'	Report	Éder Baiano 41'	Stadium: Seoul World Cup Stadium; Attendance: 33,663; Referee: Lee Sang-Yong

24 September 26	FC Seoul	4–1	Daejeon Citizen	Mapo-gu, Seoul
17:00 UTC+9	Damjanović 3', 16', 71'; Molina 82'	Report	Lee Sang-Hyup 70'	Stadium: Seoul World Cup Stadium; Attendance: 30,286; Referee: Hong Jin-Ho

3 October 27	Suwon Samsung Bluewings	1–0	FC Seoul	Suwon, Gyeonggi
15:30 UTC+9	Ristić 78'	Report		Stadium: Suwon World Cup Stadium; Attendance: 44,537; Referee: Choi Kwang-Bo

16 October 28	Incheon United	1–1	FC Seoul	Seo-gu, Incheon
15:00 UTC+9	Jung In-Hwan 62'	Report	Molina 73'	Stadium: Incheon Munhak Stadium; Attendance: 6,822; Referee: Yoo Sun-Ho

23 October 29	FC Seoul	3–1	Seongnam Ilhwa Chunma	Mapo-gu, Seoul
15:00 UTC+9	Kim Tae-Hwan 35'; Damjanović 76'; Molina 90+2'	Report	Jeon Seong-Chan 24'	Stadium: Seoul World Cup Stadium; Attendance: 42,909; Referee: Mun Jin-Hee

30 October 30	Gyeongnam	0–3	FC Seoul	Jinju, Gyeongnam
15:00 UTC+9	Jung Da-Hwon (yellow card) 52' (yellow-red card) 68'	Report	Ha Dae-Sung 59', 77', 85'	Stadium: Jinju Stadium; Attendance: 22,468; Referee: Lee Sang-Yong

==== K League Championship ====
19 November First Round	FC Seoul	1–3	Ulsan Hyundai	Mapo-gu, Seoul
15:00 UTC+9	Dejan 58'	Report	Kwak Tae-Hwi 17'; Kim Shin-Wook 33'; Go Seul-Ki 59'	Stadium: Seoul World Cup Stadium; Attendance: 30,799; Referee: Lee Sam-Ho

=== FA Cup ===
18 May Round of 32	FC Seoul	4–0	Yongin City Government	Mapo-gu, Seoul
19:30 UTC+9	Choi Jong-hoan 57'; Damjanović 64', 83'; Adilson 71'			Stadium: Seoul World Cup Stadium; Attendance: 3,733

15 June Round of 16	Busan Transportation Corp.	0–1	FC Seoul	Seo-gu, Busan
19:00 UTC+9			Djeparov 45'	Stadium: Busan Gudeok Stadium; Attendance: 1,014; Referee: Kim Wan-Tae

27 July Quarterfinal	Pohang Steelers	4 – 2 (a.e.t.)	FC Seoul	Pohang Steel Yard, Pohang
19:30 KST	Asamoah 31'; Mota 64'; No Byung-Jun 99', 108'		Damjanović 51'; Molina 73'; Adilson (yellow card) 8' (yellow-red card) 117'	Attendance: 10,419

=== League Cup ===
29 June Quarterfinal	Gyeongnam	1–0	FC Seoul	Changwon, Gyeongnam
20:00 UTC+9	Yoon Bit-Garam 26'	Report		Stadium: Changwon Football Center; Attendance: 2,469; Referee: Ahn Yong-Hee

=== AFC Champions League ===
==== Group stage ====
Pos	Team	Pld	W	D	L	GF	GA	GD	Pts	Qualification
1	(South Korea) FC Seoul	6	3	2	1	9	4	+5	11	Advance to knockout stage
2	(Japan) Nagoya Grampus	6	3	1	2	9	6	+3	10	Advance to knockout stage
3	(United Arab Emirates) Al-Ain	6	2	1	3	4	9	−5	7	
4	(China) Hangzhou Greentown	6	1	2	3	3	6	−3	5	

Source: Stats.The-AFC.com

2 March Group Round	Al-Ain (United Arab Emirates)	0–1	(South Korea) FC Seoul	Al Ain, United Arab Emirates
19:00 UTC+4		Report	Damjanović 25'	Stadium: Tahnoun bin Mohammed Stadium; Attendance: 5,128; Referee: Alireza Faghani (Iran)

15 March Group Round	FC Seoul (South Korea)	3–0	(China) Hangzhou Greentown	Seoul, South Korea
20:00 UTC+9	Damjanovic 16'; Ou Kyoung-Jun 70'; Molina 80'	Report		Stadium: Seoul World Cup Stadium; Attendance: 6,103; Referee: Ravshan Irmatov (Uzbekistan)

6 April Group Round	Nagoya Grampus (Japan)	1–1	(South Korea) FC Seoul	Nagoya, Japan
19:00 UTC+9	Nagai 14'	Report	Choi Hyun-Tae 61'	Stadium: Mizuho Athletic Stadium; Attendance: 7,348; Referee: Khalil Al Ghamdi (Saudi Arabia)

19 April Group Round	FC Seoul (South Korea)	0–2	(Japan) Nagoya Grampus	Seoul, South Korea
19:00 UTC+9		Report	Kanazaki 26'; Nagai 81'	Stadium: Seoul World Cup Stadium; Attendance: 10,927; Referee: Mohsen Torky (Iran)

4 May Group Round	FC Seoul (South Korea)	3–0	(United Arab Emirates) Al-Ain	Seoul, South Korea
20:00 UTC+9	Ko Yo-Han 17'; Damjanovic 40', 73'	Report		Stadium: Seoul World Cup Stadium; Attendance: 23,623; Referee: Abdullah Balideh (Qatar)

11 May Group Round	Hangzhou Greentown (China)	1–1	(South Korea) FC Seoul	Hangzhou, China PR
20:00 UTC+8	Zeng Yue 90+2'	Report	Bang Seung-Hwan 66'	Stadium: Zheijiang Dragon Stadium; Attendance: 12,178; Referee: Alireza Faghani (Iran)

==== Knockout stage ====
25 May Round of 16	FC Seoul (South Korea)	3–0	(Japan) Kashima Antlers	Seoul, South Korea
19:30 UTC+9	Bang Seung-Hwan 38'; Damjanović 55'; Koh Myong-Jin 90+2'	Report		Stadium: Seoul World Cup Stadium; Attendance: 12,725; Referee: Nawaf Shukralla (Bahrain)

14 September Quarter-finals	Al-Ittihad (Saudi Arabia)	3–1	(South Korea) FC Seoul	Jeddah, Saudi Arabia
20:35 UTC+3	Noor 45'; Al-Muwallad 76'; Wendel 90+2'	Report	Choi Tae-Uk 83'	Stadium: Prince Abdullah al-Faisal Stadium; Attendance: 16,790; Referee: Alireza Faghani (Iran)

27 September Quarter-finals	FC Seoul (South Korea)	1–0	(Saudi Arabia) Al-Ittihad	Seoul, South Korea
19:30 UTC+9	Molina 85'	Report		Stadium: Seoul World Cup Stadium; Attendance: 15,000; Referee: Valentin Kovalenko (Uzbekistan)

== Match reports and match highlights ==
Fixtures and Results at FC Seoul Official Website (in English)

== Season statistics ==
=== K League records ===
Season	Teams	Final Position	League Position	Pld	W	D	L	GF	GA	GD	Pts	Manager
2011	16	5th	3rd	30	16	7	7	56	38	+18	55	(South Korea) Hwangbo Kwan (South Korea) Choi Yong-Soo (C)

==== K League Championship records ====
Season	Teams	Position	Pld	W	D	L	GF	GA	GD	PSO	Manager
2011	6	5th (round of 6)	1	0	0	1	1	3	-2	N/A	(South Korea) Choi Yong-Soo (C)

=== All competitions records ===
Seasoan	Teams	K League	Championship	League Cup	FA Cup	AFC Champions League	Manager
2011	16	3rd	5th	Quarter-finals (RC)	Quarter-finals	Quarter-finals	(South Korea) Hwangbo Kwan (South Korea) Choi Yong-Soo (C)

=== Attendance records ===
Season	Season Total Att.	K League Total Att.	Regular season Average Att.	League Cup Average Att.	FA Cup Total / Average Att.	ACL Total / Average Att.	Friendly Match Att.	Att. Ranking	Notes
520,138	448,027	28,002	N/A	3,733 / 3,733	68,378 / 13,676	N/A	K League Season; Total Att. 1st	K League Championship included	

- Season total attendance is K League Regular Season, League Cup, FA Cup, AFC Champions League in the aggregate and friendly match attendance is not included.
- K League season total attendance is K League Regular Season and League Cup in the aggregate.

== Squad statistics ==
=== Appearances and goals ===
Statistics accurate as of match played 19 November 2011
Numbers in parentheses denote appearances as substitute.

No.	Nat.	Pos.	Name	League		FA Cup		League Cup		AFC Champions League		Total	
No.	Nat.	Pos.	Name	Apps	Goals	Apps	Goals	Apps	Goals	Apps	Goals	Apps	Goals
1	KOR	GK	Kim Yong-Dae	29	0	3	0	0	0	7	0	39 (0)	0
3	KOR	DF	Kim Dong-Woo	14 (1)	0	0	0	1	0	2	0	17 (1)	0
4	KOR	DF	Kim Dong-Jin	6 (3)	1	1	0	0	0	2 (2)	0	9 (5)	1
5	KOR	MF	Chun Je-Hun	0	0	0	0	0	0	0	0	0	0
7	KOR	MF	Ou Kyoung-Jun	2 (6)	0	0	0	0 (1)	0	2	1	4 (7)	1
8	BRA	DF	Adilson	30	0	3	1	0	0	9	0	42 (0)	1
10	MNE	FW	Dejan Damjanović	29 (1)	24	2 (1)	3	0	0	9	5	40 (2)	32
11	COL	MF	Mauricio Molina	28 (1)	10	1 (1)	1	0	0	7 (1)	2	36 (3)	13
13	KOR	DF	Hyun Young-Min	25 (1)	1	2	0	0 (1)	0	7	0	34 (2)	1
14	KOR	MF	Moon Ki-Han	6 (6)	0	1 (1)	0	1	0	1 (6)	0	9 (13)	0
15	KOR	DF	Park Yong-Ho	15 (3)	1	2	0	0	0	4	0	21 (3)	1
16	KOR	MF	Ha Dae-Sung	16 (2)	6	2	0	0	0	4	0	22 (2)	6
17	KOR	DF	Lee Jung-Youl	0 (2)	0	0	0	1	0	0	0	1 (2)	0
18	KOR	FW	Bang Seung-Hwan	7 (9)	2	2	0	0	0	4 (1)	2	13 (10)	4
19	KOR	DF	Yeo Hyo-Jin	7 (2)	0	1 (1)	0	0	0	3 (1)	0	11 (4)	0
20	KOR	MF	Han Tae-You	3	0	0	0	0	0	1	0	4 (0)	0
21	KOR	MF	Go Yo-Han	19	1	2	0	0	0	7 (1)	1	28 (1)	2
22	KOR	MF	Koh Myong-Jin	23 (1)	4	2 (1)	0	0	0	4	1	29 (2)	5
23	KOR	GK	Han Il-Koo	2	0	0 (1)	0	0	0	2	0	4 (1)	0
24	KOR	GK	Jo Su-Huk	0	0	0	0	1	0	0	0	1 (0)	0
25	KOR	MF	Choi Jong-hoan	6 (1)	1	1 (1)	1	1	0	1	0	9 (2)	2
26	KOR	FW	Bae Hae-Min	0 (3)	0	1	0	1	0	0	0	2 (3)	0
27	KOR	DF	Lee Kyu-Ro	12 (2)	0	3	0	0	0	3	0	18 (2)	0
28	KOR	FW	Lee Seung-Yeoul	6 (12)	1	0 (1)	0	1	0	4	0	11 (13)	1
29	KOR	MF	Kim Tae-Hwan	9 (7)	1	0 (1)	0	1	0	2 (4)	0	12 (12)	1
30	KOR	FW	Kang Jung-Hun	0 (8)	2	0	0	1	0	0 (1)	0	1 (9)	2
31	KOR	GK	Yu Sang-Hun	0 (1)	0	0	0	0	0	0	0	0 (1)	0
32	KOR	MF	Yoon Seung-Hyeon	0	0	0	0	0	0	0	0	0	0
33	KOR	MF	Choi Tae-Uk	4 (9)	0	0	0	0	0	1 (1)	1	5 (10)	1
35	KOR	MF	Choi Hyun-Tae	23 (4)	1	2	0	1	0	7	1	33 (4)	2
36	KOR	FW	Ko Kwang-Min	3 (3)	0	0 (1)	0	1	0	0 (2)	0	4 (6)	0
37	KOR	FW	Lee Jae-An	2 (5)	0	1	0	0	0	1 (5)	0	4 (10)	0
38	KOR	DF	Kim Ki-Baek	0	0	0	0	0	0	0	0	0	0
41	KOR	DF	Choi Won-Wook	0	0	0	0	0	0	0	0	0	0
42	KOR	MF	Cho Nam-Kee	0	0	0	0	0	0	0	0	0	0
43	KOR	DF	Oh Byoung-Min	0	0	0	0	0	0	0	0	0	0
44	KOR	DF	Song Seung-Ju	0	0	0	0	0 (1)	0	0	0	0 (1)	0
45	KOR	MF	Lee Han-Wool	0	0	0	0	0	0	0	0	0	0
46	KOR	DF	Lee Dong-Nyuk	0	0	0	0	0	0	0	0	0	0
48	KOR	FW	Kim Dong-Hyo	0	0	0	0	0	0	0	0	0	0
2	KOR	DF	Choi Hyun-Bin (loan out)	0	0	0	0	0	0	0	0	0	0
34	KOR	MF	Lee Kwang-Jin (loan out)	0	0	0	0	0	0	0	0	0	0
40	KOR	MF	Kyung Jae-Yoon (loan out)	0	0	0	0	0	0	0	0	0	0
88	UZB	MF	Server Djeparov (out)	15	0	1	1	0	0	5 (1)	0	21 (1)	1

=== Goals ===
Rank	Nation	Number	Name	K League	FA Cup	League Cup	AFC Champions League	Total
1	(Montenegro)	10	Dejan Damjanović	24	3	0	5	32
2	(Colombia)	11	Mauricio Molina	10	1	0	2	13
3	(South Korea)	16	Ha Dae-Sung	6	0	0	0	6
4	(South Korea)	21	Go Yo-Han	3	0	0	1	4
=	(South Korea)	18	Bang Seung-Hwan	2	0	0	2	4
5	(South Korea)	22	Koh Myong-Jin	2	0	0	1	3
6	(South Korea)	30	Kang Jung-Hun	2	0	0	0	2
=	(South Korea)	35	Choi Hyun-Tae	1	0	0	1	2
=	(South Korea)	25	Choi Jong-hoan	1	1	0	0	2
7	(South Korea)	4	Kim Dong-Jin	1	0	0	0	1
=	(South Korea)	13	Hyun Young-Min	1	0	0	0	1
=	(South Korea)	15	Park Yong-Ho	1	0	0	0	1
=	(South Korea)	28	Lee Seung-Yeoul	1	0	0	0	1
=	(South Korea)	29	Kim Tae-Hwan	1	0	0	0	1
=	(South Korea)	7	Ou Kyoung-Jun	0	0	0	1	1
=	(South Korea)	33	Choi Tae-Uk	0	0	0	1	1
=	(Brazil)	8	Adilson	0	1	0	0	1
=	(Uzbekistan)	88	Server Djeparov	0	1	0	0	1
/	/	/	Own Goals	1	0	0	0	1
/	/	/	TOTALS	57	7	0	14	78

=== Assists ===
Rank	Nation	Number	Name	K League	FA Cup	League Cup	AFC Champions League	Total
1	(Colombia)	11	Mauricio Molina	12	1	0	0	13
2	(Montenegro)	10	Dejan Damjanović	7	0	0	3	10
3	(South Korea)	22	Koh Myong-Jin	7	0	0	1	8
4	(South Korea)	13	Hyun Young-Min	4	0	0	0	4
5	(South Korea)	33	Choi Tae-Uk	3	0	0	0	3
=	(South Korea)	16	Ha Dae-Sung	2	0	0	1	3
=	(South Korea)	18	Bang Seung-Hwan	1	2	0	0	3
6	(Uzbekistan)	88	Server Djeparov	1	0	0	1	2
=	(South Korea)	21	Go Yo-Han	0	1	0	1	2
7	(Brazil)	8	Adilson	1	0	0	0	1
=	(South Korea)	19	Yeo Hyo-Jin	1	0	0	0	1
=	(South Korea)	27	Lee Kyu-Ro	1	0	0	0	1
=	(South Korea)	30	Kang Jung-Hun	1	0	0	0	1
=	(South Korea)	36	Ko Kwang-Min	1	0	0	0	1
=	(South Korea)	4	Kim Dong-Jin	0	0	0	1	1
=	(South Korea)	27	Lee Kyu-Ro	0	0	0	1	1
=	(South Korea)	29	Kim Tae-Hwan	0	0	0	1	1
=	(South Korea)	37	Lee Jae-An	0	0	0	1	1
=	(South Korea)	25	Choi Jong-hoan	0	1	0	0	1
/	/	/	TOTALS	42	5	0	11	58

== Coaching staff ==
Position	Name	Notes
Manager	(South Korea) Hwangbo-Kwan	−2011/04/26
Caretaker Manager	(South Korea) Choi Yong-Soo	2011/04/26–
Assistant manager	(South Korea) Choi Yong-Soo	−2011/04/26
First-team coach	(South Korea) Lee Ki-Hyung	−2011/07/06
First-team coach	(South Korea) Kim Seong-Jae	2011/04/26–
First-team coach	(South Korea) Lee Won-Jun	2011/07/06–
Reserve Team Manager	(South Korea) Kim Sung-Nam	
Reserve Team Coach	(South Korea) Kim Seong-Jae	−2011/04/26
Reserve Team Coach	(South Korea) Lee Ki-Hyung	2011/07/06–
Goalkeeping coach	(South Korea) Sin Bum-Chul	
Fitness coach	(Japan) Kanno Atsushi	
U-18 Team Manager	(South Korea) Lee Young-Ik	
U-18 Team Coach	(South Korea) Lee Won-Jun	−2011/07/06
U-18 Team Goalkeeping Coach	(South Korea) Weon Jong-teok	
Technical director & Chief Scout	(South Korea) Choi Gi-Bong	

== Players ==
=== Team squad ===
All players registered for the 2011 season are listed.

Note: Flags indicate national team as defined under FIFA eligibility rules; some limited exceptions apply. Players may hold more than one non-FIFA nationality.

No.	Pos.	Nation	Player
1	GK	KOR	Kim Yong-Dae
2	DF	KOR	Choi Hyun-Bin (Out)
3	DF	KOR	Kim Dong-Woo
4	DF	KOR	Kim Dong-Jin
5	MF	KOR	Chun Je-Hun
7	MF	KOR	Ou Kyoung-Jun
8	DF	BRA	Adilson dos Santos
10	FW	MNE	Dejan Damjanović
11	MF	COL	Mauricio Molina
13	DF	KOR	Hyun Young-Min (vice-captain)
14	MF	KOR	Moon Ki-Han
15	DF	KOR	Park Yong-Ho (captain)
16	MF	KOR	Ha Dae-Sung
17	DF	KOR	Lee Jung-Youl
18	FW	KOR	Bang Seung-Hwan
19	DF	KOR	Yeo Hyo-Jin
20	MF	KOR	Han Tae-You
21	MF	KOR	Ko Yo-Han
22	MF	KOR	Koh Myong-Jin
23	GK	KOR	Han Il-Koo
24	GK	KOR	Jo Su-Huk
25	MF	KOR	Choi Jong-hoan
26	FW	KOR	Bae Hae-Min

No.	Pos.	Nation	Player
27	DF	KOR	Lee Kyu-Ro
28	FW	KOR	Lee Seung-Yeoul
29	MF	KOR	Kim Tae-Hwan
30	MF	KOR	Kang Jung-Hun
31	GK	KOR	Yu Sang-Hun
32	MF	KOR	Yoon Seung-Hyeon
33	MF	KOR	Choi Tae-Uk
34	MF	KOR	Lee Kwang-Jin (Out)
35	MF	KOR	Choi Hyun-Tae
36	FW	KOR	Ko Kwang-Min
37	FW	KOR	Lee Jae-An
38	DF	KOR	Kim Ki-Baek
39	FW	KOR	Jung Seung-Yong (Out)
40	DF	KOR	Kyung Jae-Yoon (Out)
41	DF	KOR	Choi Won-Wook (Conscripted)
42	MF	KOR	Cho Nam-Kee (Conscripted)
43	DF	KOR	Oh Byoung-Min
44	DF	KOR	Song Seung-Ju
45	MF	KOR	Lee Han-Wool
46	DF	KOR	Lee Dong-Nyck
48	FW	KOR	Kim Dong-Hyo
88	MF	UZB	Server Djeparov (Out)

=== Out on loan & military service ===
Note: Flags indicate national team as defined under FIFA eligibility rules; some limited exceptions apply. Players may hold more than one non-FIFA nationality.

No.	Pos.	Nation	Player
—	FW	KOR	Kim Hyun-Sung (to (South Korea) Daegu FC until December 2011)
—	MF	KOR	Lee Hyun-Seung (to (South Korea) Jeonnam Dragons until December 2011)
—	FW	KOR	Jung Seung-Yong (to (South Korea) Gyeongnam FC until December 2011)
—	MF	KOR	Lee Kwang-Jin (to (South Korea) Daegu FC until July 2012)
—	MF	KOR	Kyung Jae-Yoon (to (South Korea) Daegu FC until December 2011)
—	DF	KOR	Choi Hyun-Bin (to (South Korea) Daejeon Citizen until December 2011)

No.	Pos.	Nation	Player
—	DF	KOR	Choi Hyo-Jin (to (South Korea) Sangju Sangmu until September 2012)
—	DF	KOR	Lee Jong-Min (to (South Korea) Sangju Sangmu until September 2012)
—	MF	KOR	Kim Chi-Woo (to (South Korea) Sangju Sangmu until September 2012)

- In : Transferred from other teams in the middle of season.
- Out : Transferred to other teams in the middle of season.
- Discharged : Transferred from Sangju Sangmu and Police FC for military service in the middle of season. (Registered in 2011 season)
- Conscripted : Transferred to Sangju Sangmu and Police FC for military service after end of season.

== Transfers ==
=== In ===
#	Name	POS	Moving from	Mode	Window	Period	Fee	Notes
1	(South Korea) Yeo Hyo-Jin	DF	(Japan) Tochigi S.C.	Loan return	Winter (2011-01-01)		N/A	
2	(South Korea) Ou Kyoung-Jun	MF	(South Korea) Daejeon Citizen	Loan return	Winter (2011-01-01)		N/A	
3	(Colombia) Mauricio Molina	MF	(South Korea) Seongnam Ilhwa Chunma	Transfer	Winter (2011-01-24)	3 years (2014-01-23)	$1,350,000~1,800,000	
4	(South Korea) Kim Dong-Jin	DF	(South Korea) Ulsan Hyundai	Free transfer (Contract expired)	Winter (2011-01-24)	1 year (2012-12-31)	Free	Free Agent
5	(Uzbekistan) Server Djeparov	MF	(Uzbekistan) FC Bunyodkor	Transfer	Winter (2011-02-08)	3 years (2014-02-07)	$1,000,000~1,350,000	
6	(South Korea) Kim Dong-Hyo	FW	(South Korea) Gyeongnam FC	Transfer	Winter (2011-03-18)		Undisclosed	

==== Rookie Draft ====
#	Name	POS	Moving from	Mode	Notes
1	(South Korea) Yoo Dong-Won	FW	(South Korea) Dongbuk High School	Youth system (Univ.)	FC Seoul U-18 Team
2	(South Korea) Jung Dong-Chul	FW	(South Korea) Dongbuk High School	Youth system (Univ.)	FC Seoul U-18 Team
3	(South Korea) Yoo Jae-Geun	GK	(South Korea) Dongbuk High School	Youth system (Univ.)	FC Seoul U-18 Team
4	(South Korea) Jun Byeong-Soo	MF	(South Korea) Dongbuk High School	Youth system (Univ.)	FC Seoul U-18 Team
5	(South Korea) Yoon Seung-Hyeon	MF	(South Korea) Yonsei University	Regular (1st)	
6	(South Korea) Ko Kwang-Min	FW	(South Korea) Ajou University	Regular (2nd)	
7	(South Korea) Lee Jae-An	FW	(South Korea) Halla University	Regular (4th)	
8	(South Korea) Kyung Jae-Yoon	MF	(South Korea) Dongguk University	Regular (5th)	
9	(South Korea) Kim Ki-Baek	DF	(South Korea) Daegu University	Extra	
10	(South Korea) Yu Sang-Hun	GK	(South Korea) Hongik University	Extra	
11	(South Korea) Oh Byoung-Min	DF	(South Korea) Sun Moon University	Extra	
12	(South Korea) Lee Han-Wool	MF	(South Korea) Dongbuk High School	Extra	
13	(South Korea) Lee Dong-Nyck	DF	(South Korea) Dongbuk High School	Extra	
14	(South Korea) Cho Nam-Kee	MF	(South Korea) Dongguk University	Extra	

- (Univ.) means player who go to university then back to FC Seoul.
- (After Univ.) means player who is joined FC Seoul after entering university.

=== Out ===
#	Name	POS	Moving to	Mode	Window	Period	Fee	Notes
1	(South Korea) Ahn Sang-Hyun	MF	(South Korea) Daegu FC	Transfer	Winter (2011-02-25)	Undisclosed	Undisclosed	Loan finish
2	(South Korea) Jung Jo-Gook	FW	(France) AJ Auxerre	Free transfer (Contract expired)	Winter (2011–01-04)	2 years 6 months	Free	Free Agent
3	(South Korea) Lee Yun-Pyo	DF	(South Korea) Incheon United	Free transfer (Contract terminated)	Winter (2011-01-06)	Undisclosed	Free	
4	(South Korea) Kang Jae-Wook	GK	(South Korea) Chungju Hummel	Free transfer (Contract terminated)	Winter (2011-01-06)	Undisclosed	Free	Free Agent
5	(South Korea) Lee Yoon-Ho	DF	(South Korea) Jeju United	Free transfer (Contract terminated)	Winter (2011-01-06)	Undisclosed	Free	
6	(South Korea) Park Young-Jun	MF	(South Korea) Jeonnam Dragons	Free transfer (Contract terminated)	Winter (2011–01-06)	Undisclosed	Free	Free Agent
7	(South Korea) Jeon Ho-Yeon	MF	(South Korea) Daegu FC	Free transfer (Contract terminated)	Winter (2011-01-06)	Undisclosed	Free	Free Agent
8	(South Korea) Jung Sang-Ho	FW	Unknown	Contract terminated	Winter (2011-01-06)	Undisclosed	Free	Free Agent
9	(South Korea) Jung Da-Hwon	DF	(South Korea) Gyeongnam FC	Free transfer (Contract terminated)	Winter (2011-01-07)	Undisclosed	Free	Free Agent
10	(South Korea) Kim Jin-Kyu	DF	(China) Dalian Shide	Free transfer (Contract expired)	Winter (2011-01-10)	2 years	Free	Free Agent
11	(South Korea) Yoon Dong-Min	FW	(South Korea) Busan IPark	Free transfer (Contract expired)	Winter (2011-01-11)	Undisclosed	Free	Free Agent
12	(South Korea) Choi Won-Kwon	DF	(South Korea) Jeju United	Transfer	Winter (2011-01-25)	Undisclosed	Undisclosed	
13	(South Korea) Kim Han-Yoon	MF	(South Korea) Busan IPark	Free transfer (Contract expired)	Winter (2011-02-01)	Undisclosed	Free	Free Agent
14	(South Korea) Yoon Hong-Chang	DF	(South Korea) Daegu FC	Transfer	Winter (2011-02-25)	Undisclosed	Undisclosed	
15	(Uzbekistan) Server Djeparov	MF	(Saudi Arabia) Al-Shabab	Transfer	Summer (2011-07-09)	Undisclosed	€5,500,000	

==== Loan & Military service ====
#	Name	POS	Moving to	Window	Period	Fee	Notes
1	(South Korea) Choi Hyo-Jin	DF	(South Korea) Gwangju Sangmu	End of the 2010 season (2010-12-06)	21 months	N/A	
2	(South Korea) Lee Jong-min	DF	(South Korea) Gwangju Sangmu	End of the 2010 season (2010-12-06)	21 months	N/A	
3	(South Korea) Kim Chi-Woo	MF	(South Korea) Gwangju Sangmu	End of the 2010 season (2010-12-06)	21 months	N/A	
4	(South Korea) Lee Hyun-Seung	MF	(South Korea) Jeonnam Dragons	Winter (2011-01-17)	1 year	Undisclosed	
5	(South Korea) Jung Seung-Yong	FW	(South Korea) Gyeongnam FC	Winter (2011-03-03)	1 year	Free	
6	(South Korea) Choi Hyun-Bin	DF	(South Korea) Daejeon Citizen	Summer (2011-07-28)	1 year	Free	
7	(South Korea) Lee Kwang-Jin	MF	(South Korea) Daegu FC	Summer (2011-07-28)	1 year	Free	
8	(South Korea) Kyung Jae-Yoon	MF	(South Korea) Daegu FC	Summer (2011-07-28)	1 year	Free	

== See also ==
- FC Seoul
