= 2009 FC Seoul season =

FC Seoul
2009 season
- Chairman: Huh Chang-soo
- Manager: Şenol Güneş
- K-League: 5th
- FA Cup: Round of 16
- League Cup: 3rd
- Top goalscorer: League: Dejan (14); All: Dejan (19)
- Highest home attendance: 36,764 vs Jeonbuk (League, 12 September)
- Lowest home attendance: 1,315 vs Gimhae (FA Cup, 13 May)
- Average home league attendance: 16,535
Home colours	Away colours

== Competitions ==
=== Overview ===
Competition	Starting round	Final position	Record							
Competition	Starting round	Final position	Pld	W	D	L	GF	GA	GD	Win %
K League	Matchday 1	Matchday 38					—			
FA Cup	Round of 32						—			
League Cup	Group stage						—			
AFC Champions League	Group stage						—			
Total			0	0	0	0	0	0	+0	—

Last updated: 31 December 2009
Source: Fixtures and Results at FC Seoul Official Website

== Match reports and match highlights ==
Fixtures and Results at FC Seoul Official Website (in English)

== Season statistics ==
=== K League records ===
Season	Teams	Final Position	League Position	Pld	W	D	L	GF	GA	GD	Pts	Manager
2009	15	5th	3rd	28	16	5	7	47	27	+20	53	(Turkey) Şenol Güneş

==== K League Championship records ====
Season	Teams	Position	Pld	W	D	L	GF	GA	GD	PSO	Manager
2009	6	5th (round of 6)	1	0	1	0	1	1	0	2–3 L	(Turkey) Şenol Güneş

=== All competitions records ===
Seasoan	Teams	K-League	Championship	League Cup	FA Cup	AFC Champions League	Manager
2009	15	5th	5th (round of 6)	Semi-finals	Round of 16	Quarter-finals	(Turkey) Şenol Güneş

=== Attendance records ===
Season	Season Total Att.	K League Total Att.	Regular season Average Att.	League Cup Average Att.	FA Cup Total / Average Att.	ACL Total / Average Att.	Friendly Match Att.	Att. Ranking	Notes
2009	319,250	270,624	16,535	11,300	1,315 / 1,315	47,311 / 11,828	65,000 (Manchester United)	K League Season; Total Att. 2nd	K League Championship included

- Season total attendance is K League Regular Season, League Cup, FA Cup, AFC Champions League in the aggregate and friendly match attendance is not included.
- K League season total attendance is K League Regular Season and League Cup in the aggregate.

== Squad statistics ==
=== Goals ===
Pos	K League	League Cup	FA Cup	AFC Champions League	Total	Notes
1	(Montenegro) Dejan (14)	(South Korea) Lee Seung-Yeoul (2)	(South Korea) Jung Jo-Gook (1) (South Korea) Kim Chi-Gon (1) (South Korea) Lee Sang-Hup (1)	(Montenegro) Dejan (5)	(Montenegro) Dejan (19)	
2	(South Korea) Jung Jo-Gook (7)	(Brazil) Anderson (1)	N/A	(South Korea) Jung Jo-Gook (4)	(South Korea) Jung Jo-Gook (12)	
3	(South Korea) Lee Seung-Yeoul (5)	(South Korea) Ki Sung-Yueng (1) (Brazil) Adi (1)	N/A	(South Korea) Kim Chi-Woo (2) (South Korea) Sim Woo-Yeon (2)	(South Korea) Lee Seung-Yeoul (7)	
4	(Brazil) Anderson (3)	N/A	No scorer	N/A	(South Korea) Ki Sung-Yueng (5)	
5	(South Korea) Lee Chung-Yong (3)	No scorer	No scorer	(South Korea) Kim Seung-Yong (1) (South Korea) Lee Sang-Hup (1) (South Korea) Park Yong-Ho (1) (South Korea) Kim Han-Yoon (1) (South Korea) Ki Sung-Yueng (1)	(Brazil) Anderson (4)	

=== Assists ===
Pos	K League	League Cup	Total	Notes
1	(South Korea) Ki Sung-Yueng (9)	(South Korea) Kim Chi-Woo (1)	(South Korea) Ki Sung-Yueng (10)	
2	(South Korea) Lee Chung-Yong (4)	(South Korea) Kim Seung-Yong (1) (South Korea) Lee Seung-Yeoul (1)	(South Korea) Lee Chung-Yong (4)	
3	(South Korea) Kim Chi-Woo (3)	N/A	(South Korea) Kim Chi-Woo (4)	
4	(South Korea) Kim Seung-Yong (3)	(South Korea) Ki Sung-Yueng (1)	(South Korea) Kim Seung-Yong (4)	
5	(South Korea) Kim Jin-kyu (3)	No assistor	(South Korea) Kim Jin-kyu (3)	

== Coaching staff ==
Position	Name	Notes
Manager	(Turkey) Şenol Güneş	
Assistant manager	(South Korea) Lee Young-jin	
First-team coach	(Turkey) Seref Çiçek	
First-team coach	(South Korea) Choi Yong-Soo	
Reserve Team Manager	(South Korea) Kim Sung-Nam	
Reserve Team Coach	(South Korea) Kim Yong-Kab	
Goalkeeping coach	(Turkey) Yasin Özdenak	
Fitness coach	Unknown	
U-18 Team Manager	(South Korea) Choi Jin-Han	
U-18 Team Coach	(South Korea) Lee Young-Ik	
U-18 Team Coach	(South Korea) Lee Won-Jun	
Technical director & Chief Scout	(South Korea) Choi Gi-Bong	

== Players ==
=== Team squad ===
All players registered for the 2009 season are listed.

Note: Flags indicate national team as defined under FIFA eligibility rules; some limited exceptions apply. Players may hold more than one non-FIFA nationality.

No.	Pos.	Nation	Player
1	GK	KOR	Kim Ho-Jun
2	DF	KOR	Yoon Hong-Chang
3	DF	KOR	Ahn Tae-Eun
4	DF	KOR	Park Yong-Ho
5	DF	FRA	Kevin Hatchi (Out)
6	DF	KOR	Kim Jin-kyu (Vice-captain)
7	MF	KOR	Kim Chi-Woo
8	DF	BRA	Adilson dos Santos
9	FW	KOR	Jung Jo-Gook
10	FW	MNE	Dejan Damjanović
11	MF	KOR	Kim Seung-Yong
13	MF	KOR	An Sang-Hyun (Out)
13	MF	KOR	Ou Kyoung-Jun (In)
14	MF	KOR	Kim Han-Yoon
15	MF	KOR	Go Yo-Han
16	MF	KOR	Koh Myong-Jin
17	DF	KOR	Lee Jong-min
18	FW	BRA	Anderson (In)
19	FW	KOR	Lee Sang-Hup
20	MF	KOR	Han Tae-You
21	MF	KOR	Ki Sung-Yong
22	DF	KOR	Kim Chi-Gon (captain)

No.	Pos.	Nation	Player
23	GK	KOR	Jo Su-Huk
24	DF	KOR	Jeong Hyung-Joon
25	FW	KOR	Sim Woo-Yeon
26	MF	KOR	Moon Ki-Han
27	MF	KOR	Lee Chung-Yong (Out)
28	FW	KOR	Lee Seung-Yeoul
29	MF	KOR	Lee Hwa-Seob
30	MF	KOR	Jung Da-Hwon
31	GK	KOR	Kang Jae-Wook
32	MF	KOR	Kim Ui-Beom
33	MF	KOR	Park Young-Joon
34	DF	KOR	Jung Sung-Ho
35	DF	KOR	Yeo Hyo-Jin
36	MF	KOR	An Jung-Gu
37	FW	KOR	Seo Seung-Hoon
38	MF	KOR	Choi Jae-Woong
39	FW	KOR	Kim Hyun-Sung
40	MF	KOR	Cho Beom-Seok
41	GK	KOR	Park Dong-Suk
43	FW	KOR	Bae Hae-Min (In)
52	DF	KOR	Choi Jae-Soo (Discharged)

=== Out on loan & military service ===
Note: Flags indicate national team as defined under FIFA eligibility rules; some limited exceptions apply. Players may hold more than one non-FIFA nationality.

No.	Pos.	Nation	Player
—	FW	KOR	Bae Hae-Min (to (Czech Republic) FK Viktoria Žižkov until July 2009)
—	FW	KOR	Ahn Sang-Hyun (to (South Korea) Gyeongnam FC until December 2010)

No.	Pos.	Nation	Player
—	DF	KOR	Choi Jae-Soo (to (South Korea) Gwangju Sangmu until October 2009 / Discharged)
—	DF	KOR	Kang Myung-Chul (to (South Korea) Police FC until October 2009 / Discharged^{[1]})
—	DF	KOR	Choi Young-Il (to (South Korea) Police FC until October 2009 / Discharged^{[1]})
—	DF	KOR	Choi Won-Kwon (to (South Korea) Gwangju Sangmu until October 2010)
—	MF	KOR	Chun Je-Hun (to (South Korea) Gwangju Sangmu until October 2010)

1. They were not registered 2009 season
- In : Transferred from other teams in the middle of season.
- Out : Transferred to other teams in the middle of season.
- Discharged : Transferred from Gwangju Sangmu and Police FC for military service in the middle of season. (Registered in 2009 season)
- Conscripted : Transferred to Gwangju Sangmu and Police FC for military service after end of season.

== Tactics ==
=== Starting eleven and formation ===
This section shows the most used players for each position considering a 4-4-2 formation.

No.	Pos.	Nat.	Name	MS	Notes
1	GK	(South Korea)	Kim Ho-Jun		
3	DF	(South Korea)	Ahn Tae-Eun		
4	DF	(South Korea)	Park Yong-Ho		
6	DF	(South Korea)	Kim Jin-kyu		
8	DF	(Brazil)	Adilson		
11	MF	(South Korea)	Kim Seung-Yong		
21	MF	(South Korea)	Ki Sung-Yueng		
14	MF	(South Korea)	Kim Han-Yoon		
7	MF	(South Korea)	Kim Chi-Woo		
9	FW	(South Korea)	Jung Jo-Gook		
10	FW	(Montenegro)	Dejan		

Source: Squad stats and Start formations.
Only competitive matches.
Using the most used start formation.
Ordered by position on pitch (from back right to front left).

=== Substitutes ===
No.	Pos.	Nat.	Name	MS	Notes
41	GK	(South Korea)	Park Dong-Suk		
22	DF	(South Korea)	Kim Chi-Gon		
15	FW	(South Korea)	Ko Yo-Han		
16	MF	(South Korea)	Koh Myong-Jin		
19	FW	(South Korea)	Lee Sang-Hup		
28	FW	(South Korea)	Lee Seung-Yeoul		

Source: Squad stats and Start formations.
Only competitive matches.
Using the most used start formation.
Ordered by position on pitch (from back right to front left).

== See also ==
- FC Seoul
