= 2011 Hangzhou Greentown F.C. season =

Hangzhou Greentown F.C.
- Super League: 8
- FA Cup: Quarter-finals
- AFC Champions League: Group stage
| Home colours | Away colours |

The 2011 Hangzhou Greentown F.C. season involved Hangzhou competing in the Chinese Super League, Chinese FA Cup, and AFC Champions League. Hangzhou qualified for the AFC Champions League after finishing 4th place in the 2010 Chinese Super League.

== Competitions ==
=== AFC Champions League ===
| Group F | Pld | W | D | L | GF | GA | GD | Pts |
|---|---|---|---|---|---|---|---|---|
| (South Korea) FC Seoul | 6 | 3 | 2 | 1 | 9 | 4 | +5 | 11 |
| (Japan) Nagoya Grampus | 6 | 3 | 1 | 2 | 9 | 6 | +3 | 10 |
| (United Arab Emirates) Al-Ain | 6 | 2 | 1 | 3 | 4 | 9 | −5 | 7 |
| (China) Hangzhou Greentown | 6 | 1 | 2 | 3 | 3 | 6 | −3 | 5 |

| 1 March 2011 | Hangzhou Greentown (China) | 2 – 0 | (Japan) Nagoya Grampus | Zheijiang Dragon Stadium, Hangzhou |
| 19:35 UTC+08:00 | Ramírez 60'; Bari 86' | Report | | Attendance: 28,674; Referee: Abdulrahman Abdou (Qatar) |

| 15 March 2011 | FC Seoul (South Korea) | 3 – 0 | (China) Hangzhou Greentown | Seoul World Cup Stadium, Seoul |
| 20:00 UTC+09:00 | Damjanović 16'; Ou Kyoung-Jun 70'; Molina 80' | Report | | Attendance: 6,103; Referee: Ravshan Irmatov (Uzbekistan) |

| 6 April 2011 | Hangzhou Greentown (China) | 0 – 0 | (United Arab Emirates) Al-Ain | Zheijiang Dragon Stadium, Hangzhou |
| 20:00 UTC+08:00 | | Report | | Attendance: 26,973; Referee: Saeid Mozaffarizadeh (Iran) |

| 19 April 2011 | Al-Ain (United Arab Emirates) | 1 – 0 | (China) Hangzhou Greentown | Tahnoun bin Mohammed Stadium, Al Ain |
| 19:30 UTC+04:00 | Abdulrahman 60' | Report | | Attendance: 2,324; Referee: Valentin Kovalenko (Uzbekistan) |

| 4 May 2011 | Nagoya Grampus (Japan) | 1 – 0 | (China) Hangzhou Greentown | Mizuho Athletic Stadium, Nagoya |
| 14:00 UTC+09:00 | Fujimoto 77' (pen.) | Report | | Attendance: 13,767; Referee: Nawaf Shukralla (Bahrain) |

| 11 May 2011 | Hangzhou Greentown (China) | 1 – 1 | (South Korea) FC Seoul | Zheijiang Dragon Stadium, Hangzhou |
| 20:00 UTC+08:00 | Zeng Yue 90+2' | Report | Bang Seung-Hwan 66' | Attendance: 12,178; Referee: Alireza Faghani (Iran) |
