= Ricardo Esteves =

Portuguese footballer (born 1979)

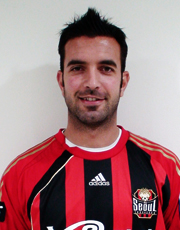

Personal information
- Full name: Ricardo Felipe dos Santos Esteves
- Date of birth: 16 September 1979 (age 47)
- Place of birth: Lisbon, Portugal
- Height: 1.73 m (5 ft 8 in)
- Positions: Right back; midfielder

Youth career
- 1990–1998: Benfica

Senior career*
Years	Team	Apps	(Gls)
1998–1999	Oriental	18	(1)
1999–2001	Benfica B	26	(0)
2000	→ Vitória Setúbal (loan)	14	(0)
2000	→ Alverca (loan)	4	(0)
2001	Benfica	10	(0)
2002	→ Braga B (loan)	2	(0)
2002	→ Braga (loan)	5	(0)
2002–2004	Nacional	24	(0)
2004	Paços Ferreira	15	(0)
2004–2007	Reggina	30	(2)
2005–2006	→ Vicenza (loan)	18	(0)
2007–2008	Marítimo	25	(0)
2008–2010	Asteras Tripolis	24	(0)
2010	Seoul	11	(4)
2010–2011	Marítimo	20	(0)
2012	Dalian Shide	7	(1)
Total		253	(8)

International career
1998–2000	Portugal U20	19	(0)
1999–2000	Portugal U21	7	(0)
Medal record
Men's football
Representing Portugal
UEFA European Under-17 Championship
Winner	1996 Austria
- * Club domestic league appearances and goals

Ricardo Felipe dos Santos Esteves (born 16 September 1979) is a retired Portuguese footballer. On the right side of the pitch, he could play as either a defender or midfielder.

He played in 117 Primeira Liga games over the course of seven seasons, representing Vitória de Setúbal, Alverca, Benfica, Braga, Nacional, Paços de Ferreira and Marítimo in the competition. He also competed professionally in four other countries, mainly Italy.

== Club career ==
Esteves was born in Lisbon. After arriving at S.L. Benfica at the age of 11 he moved constantly between the club's first and reserve teams, only appearing in ten games in the Primeira Liga, all in the same season. He was loaned once during his contract, and also had a brief spell with farm team F.C. Alverca.

Released in January 2002, Esteves represented in quick succession S.C. Braga, C.D. Nacional and F.C. Paços de Ferreira. Afterwards, he began an abroad adventure, playing three years in Italy with Reggina Calcio (two) and Vicenza Calcio in both major levels.

Esteves spent the 2007–08 campaign back in his country with C.S. Marítimo, after which he moved again, now to Greece and Asteras Tripolis. In January 2010 he was sold to FC Seoul, scoring in his debut against Daejeon Citizen.

In June, after four goals and as many assists, Esteves was released. Late in that month he returned to his country and former side Marítimo, which had qualified for the UEFA Europa League.

== International career ==
All youth levels comprised, Esteves won 53 caps for Portugal (no goals). He participated with the under-20s in the 1999 FIFA World Youth Championship held in Nigeria; in the round of 16 against Japan, as the team had no substitutes left and Sérgio Leite got injured, he played as a goalkeeper for more than one hour, conceding no goals in regulation time in an eventual 4–5 penalty shootout loss (1–1 after 120 minutes).
