= Dejan Damjanović =

Montenegrin footballer (born 1981)

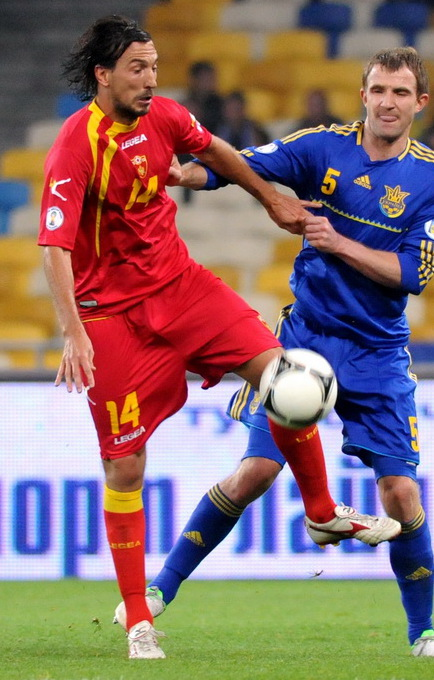
- Damjanović (left) with Montenegro in 2012

Personal information
- Date of birth: 27 July 1981 (age 45)
- Place of birth: Mostar, SR Bosnia and Herzegovina, Yugoslavia
- Height: 1.87 m (6 ft 2 in)
- Position: Forward

Youth career
- Dinamo Pančevo
- Sinđelić Beograd

Senior career*
Years	Team	Apps	(Gls)
1998–2000	Sinđelić Beograd	21	(6)
2000–2003	Železnik	13	(0)
2001–2002	→ Sremčica (loan)	21	(10)
2002	→ Srem (loan)	8	(0)
2003	→ Radnički Beograd (loan)	12	(4)
2004–2006	Bežanija	76	(37)
2004	→ Radnički Beograd (loan)	6	(0)
2006	→ Al-Ahli (loan)	10	(8)
2007	Incheon United	26	(14)
2008–2013	FC Seoul	181	(116)
2014	Jiangsu Sainty	11	(5)
2014–2015	Beijing Guoan	45	(26)
2016–2017	FC Seoul	73	(32)
2018–2019	Suwon Samsung Bluewings	54	(16)
2020	Daegu FC	23	(9)
2021–2023	Kitchee	33	(38)
Total		613	(321)

International career
2008–2015	Montenegro	30	(8)
- * Club domestic league appearances and goals

Dejan Damjanović (Serbian Cyrillic: Дејан Дамјановић, pronounced [dějan dǎmjanoʋitɕ, - damjǎː-]; born 27 July 1981), also known mononymously as Dejan, is a former Montenegrin professional footballer who played as a forward. Regarded as one of the greatest K League players in history, he is the all-time leading goalscorer of the AFC Champions League.

== Early life ==
Damjanović was born in the town of Mostar, Bosnia and Herzegovina (then part of Yugoslavia) on 27 July 1981. He fled from the Yugoslav Wars to Belgrade in Serbia. He joined under-14 team of Sinđelić Beograd, starting to learn football professionally in Serbia.

== Club career ==
=== Early career ===
Damjanović made his senior debut for the third division team Sinđelić Beograd in 1998, scoring 6 goals in 21 matches in his first season. He moved to Železnik in 2000 and later also played with Sremčica, Srem, Radnički Beograd and Bežanija. He experienced all the first, second, and third division of FR Yugoslavia/Serbia and Montenegro. In December 2006, he and his team Bežanija were in financial trouble. Bežanija wanted to get transfer fees and he also wanted to leave Serbia. He left to Guam, where K League club Incheon United held the off-season training. After tryouts, he succeeded in signing with Incheon, moving to South Korea. He scored 20 goals for a year at Incheon.

=== FC Seoul ===
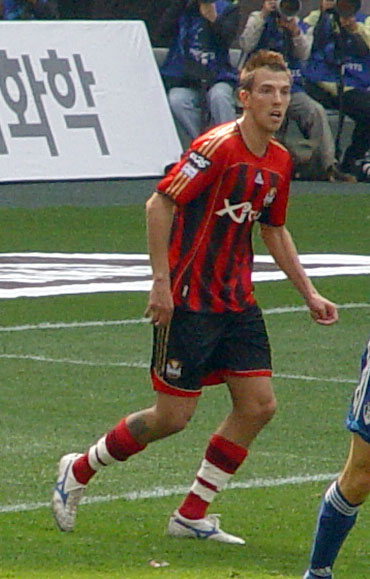
Damjanović in 2008

Damjanović signed a contract with FC Seoul on 7 December 2007. He was the second highest scorer in 2007, 2008 and 2009 K League. With 23 goals for Seoul in 2011 season, he was crowned the league's top scorer. In July 2009, he managed to score two goals against Manchester United in United's Asian tour. However, FC Seoul lost 3–2, United's goals being scored by Wayne Rooney, Federico Macheda and Dimitar Berbatov.

In January 2012, Chinese Super League club Guangzhou R&F offered $5 million to FC Seoul for Damjanović, but it was rejected by Seoul. In the first match of the 2012 K League, Damjanović was substituted out after 22 minutes against Daegu FC. It had been speculated that the FC Seoul manager, Choi Yong-soo, and Damjanović had a rift. Damjanović wanted to leave but FC Seoul would not let him. However, as time went on, FC Seoul issued an official statement by Choi saying there was no tension between the two. Damjanović scored his 100th career goal with FC Seoul from a penalty goal, along with the 101st in the same match over a 3–1 win against his former club Incheon United on 28 May 2012. On 25 July 2012, he became the top foreign goalscorer in the history of the K League by scoring his 105th goal in the match against Daejeon Citizen. The previous record holder is Saša Drakulić who made 104 goals in K League. Afterwards, he scored 31 goals in 40 appearances, thus breaking the record held by Kim Do-hoon in 2002. He finished the 2012 season with many accolades and records broken. He won the league with FC Seoul as well as becoming the Most Valuable Player, top goalscorer, and one of the Best XI. In January 2013, IFFHS ranked Damjanović seventh in the world for most goals in a top-division league during a year.

In September 2013, Damjanović scored in both of two legs of the AFC Champions League quarter finals against his former team Al-Ahli. His scoring continued against the first leg of the semi-final against Esteghlal. However, despite scoring in both legs of the 2013 AFC Champions League final against Guangzhou Evergrande, FC Seoul lost on away goals and thus ending the competition as runners-up. At the end of the 2013 season, he became the first player to receive the K League Top Scorer Award for three consecutive seasons.

=== Jiangsu Sainty ===
In December 2013, Damjanović transferred to Chinese Super League side Jiangsu Sainty with transfer fee $4.2 million. He agreed to draw an annual salary of $2 million, more than double his salary at Seoul.

=== Beijing Guoan ===
On 17 July 2014, Damjanović transferred to fellow Chinese Super League side Beijing Guoan. He once again played with Ha Dae-sung, his teammate at Seoul. At Chinese Super League, he scored the fifth and the third highest number of goals in 2014 and 2015, respectively.

=== Return to FC Seoul ===
On 28 December 2015, Damjanović returned to FC Seoul, signing a two-year contract. On 3 August 2016, he scored his 150th goal in 254th appearance in the K League, setting a record for the quickest player to reach 150 goals in the K League history. He helped Seoul regain the league title for the first time in four years.

However, Damjanović was in conflict with manager Hwang Sun-hong in the 2017 season. He publicly expressed discontent at his reduced playing time. He scored 19 goals at the league, but the club decided not to extend his contract. The next year, he joined Seoul's arch-rivals Suwon Samsung Bluewings, and was criticised as a betrayer by Seoul fans. After his retirement, he still expressed his love toward Seoul, whereas he explained his sadness about Seoul's unilateral notice and indifferent farewell. Apart from this, he criticised Hwang's treatment of foreign players and managerial style.

=== Suwon Samsung Bluewings ===
On 4 January 2018, Damjanović signed for Suwon Samsung Bluewings. He scored 10 goals in 13 matches until the semi-finals at the 2018 AFC Champions League.

In the 2019 season, Australian international Adam Taggart became Suwon's main striker instead of Damjanović. He was released in December 2019.

=== Daegu FC ===
In late December 2019, Daegu FC announced the signing of Damjanović on a free transfer. On June 14, he scored his first goal since moving against Seoul. He had 9 goals and 3 assists in 23 appearances, helping Daegu qualify for the 2021 AFC Champions League.

=== Kitchee ===
On 9 January 2021, Kitchee announced the signing of Damjanović on a free transfer. He made his debut for Kitchee on 27 February, coming off the bench in the 67th minute in a 2–1 win against Southern. On 4 March, He scored his first goal in Hong Kong in just 1 minute after being substituted. In stoppage time, he scores his second to assist the team in a 2–0 victory over Pegasus. On 23 May, Kitchee successfully defended their Hong Kong Premier League title after beating Eastern Long Lions 2–0, courtesy of two goals by Damjanović at the Hong Kong Stadium. On 24 June, he scored a goal in a group stage match against Port F.C. at the 2021 AFC Champions League, making him joint-top goalscorer along with Lee Dong-gook in Champions League history with 37 goals. On 27 June, he scored a goal against Cerezo Osaka to become the sole leader in Champions League's all-time scoring chart. He later scored twice from the penalty spot, one each in two matches against Guangzhou, to reach his 40th goal in the Champions League.

On 1 May 2022, he scored his 42nd goal in the Champions League in a 2–2 draw against Vissel Kobe in the 2022 edition, which helped Kitchee to reach the knockout stages of the competition for the first time in their history.

== International career ==
Damjanović's first match as a Montenegrin international was against Italy on 16 October 2008.

Damjanović scored his first two international goals against Cyprus in one of the 2010 FIFA World Cup qualifiers.

Damjanović played as a main striker for Montenegro at the 2014 FIFA World Cup qualification. On 16 October 2012, he scored the winning goal in a 1–0 win over Ukraine. On 26 March 2013, during a 1–1 draw with England, he came on as a substitute for Mitar Novaković in the 46th minute, and scored the equaliser thirty minutes later. On 6 September, he provided the only goal for Montenegro again as they tied 1–1 with Poland in Warsaw. On 11 October, he scored the only goal for Montenegro in their 4–1 defeat to England at Wembley Stadium. Montenegro finished third in the UEFA Group H, failing to qualify for the 2014 FIFA World Cup.

Damjanović earned 30 caps and 8 goals during his international career. His last international match was a European Championship qualifier against Moldova on 8 September 2015.

== Personal life ==
Damjanović's daughter and son were born in South Korea.

== Career statistics ==
=== Club ===
Appearances and goals by club, season and competition
Club	Season	League			National cup		League cup		Continental		Total	
Club	Season	Division	Apps	Goals	Apps	Goals	Apps	Goals	Apps	Goals	Apps	Goals
Sinđelić Beograd	1998–99	Serbian League Belgrade	21	6			—		—		21	6
Sinđelić Beograd	1999–2000	Serbian League Belgrade	0	0			—		—		0	0
Sinđelić Beograd	Total		21	6			—		—		21	6
Železnik	2000–01	1. Liga of FR Yugoslava	3	0			—		—		3	0
Železnik	2001–02	1. Liga of FR Yugoslava	10	0			—		—		10	0
Železnik	Total		13	0			—		—		13	0
Sremčica (loan)	2001–02	Serbian League Belgrade	21	10			—		—		21	10
Srem (loan)	2002–03	2. Liga SCG	8	0			—		—		8	0
Radnički Beograd (loan)	2003–04	2. Liga SCG	12	4			—		—		12	4
Bežanija	2003–04	2. Liga SCG	18	13			—		—		18	13
Bežanija	2004–05	2. Liga SCG	19	8			—		—		19	8
Bežanija	2005–06	Serbian 1. Liga	24	11			—		—		24	11
Bežanija	2006–07	Serbian SuperLiga	15	5			—		—		15	5
Bežanija	Total		76	37			—		—		76	37
Radnički Beograd (loan)	2004–05	1. Liga SCG	6	0			—		—		6	0
Al-Ahli (loan)	2005–06	Saudi Premier League	10	8					—		10	8
Incheon United	2007	K League	26	14	4	1	10	5	—		40	20
FC Seoul	2008	K League	29	15	1	0	4	0	—		34	15
FC Seoul	2009	K League	23	14	2	0	2	0	9	5	36	19
FC Seoul	2010	K League	28	13	1	0	7	6	—		36	19
FC Seoul	2011	K League	30	24	3	3	0	0	9	5	42	32
FC Seoul	2012	K League	42	31	2	0	—		—		44	31
FC Seoul	2013	K League Classic	29	19	2	1	—		13	7	44	27
FC Seoul	Total		181	116	11	4	13	6	31	17	236	143
Jiangsu Sainty	2014	Chinese Super League	11	5	0	0	—		—		11	5
Beijing Guoan	2014	Chinese Super League	16	10	2	1	—		—		18	11
Beijing Guoan	2015	Chinese Super League	29	16	2	1	—		9	2	40	19
Beijing Guoan	Total		45	26	4	2	—		9	2	58	30
FC Seoul	2016	K League Classic	36	13	4	1	—		11	5	51	19
FC Seoul	2017	K League Classic	37	19	2	0	—		4	3	43	22
FC Seoul	Total		73	32	6	1	—		15	8	94	41
Suwon Samsung Bluewings	2018	K League 1	33	13	4	4	—		13	10	50	27
Suwon Samsung Bluewings	2019	K League 1	21	3	3	0	—		—		24	3
Suwon Samsung Bluewings	Total		54	16	7	4	—		13	10	74	30
Daegu FC	2020	K League 1	23	9	2	0	—		—		25	9
Kitchee	2020–21	Hong Kong Premier League	14	17	—		0	0	6	4	20	21
Kitchee	2021–22	Hong Kong Premier League	4	4	2	1	7 (Note: Appearance(s) in Sapling Cup)	8	5	2	18	15
Kitchee	2022–23	Hong Kong Premier League	15	17	1	1	7 (Note: Four appearances and four goals in the Hong Kong Senior Challenge Shield, three appearances and three goals in Sapling Cup)	7	0	0	23	25
Kitchee	Total		33	38	3	2	14	15	11	6	61	61
Career total			613	321	37	14	37	26	79	43	766	404

=== International ===
Scores and results list Montenegro's goal tally first, score column indicates score after each Damjanović goal.

List of international goals scored by Dejan Damjanović
No.	Date	Venue	Opponent	Score	Result	Competition
1	6 June 2009	Antonis Papadopoulos Stadium, Larnaca	Cyprus	1–2	2–2	2010 FIFA World Cup qualification
2	6 June 2009	Antonis Papadopoulos Stadium, Larnaca	Cyprus	2–2	2–2	2010 FIFA World Cup qualification
3	16 October 2012	Olympic Stadium, Kyiv	Ukraine	1–0	1–0	2014 FIFA World Cup qualification
4	26 March 2013	Podgorica City Stadium, Podgorica	England	1–1	1–1	2014 FIFA World Cup qualification
5	6 September 2013	National Stadium, Warsaw, Warsaw	Poland	1–0	1–1	2014 FIFA World Cup qualification
6	11 October 2013	Wembley Stadium, London	England	1–2	1–4	2014 FIFA World Cup qualification
7	5 March 2014	Podgorica City Stadium, Podgorica	Ghana	1–0	1–0	Friendly
8	14 June 2015	Friends Arena, Solna	Sweden	1–3	1–3	UEFA Euro 2016 qualifying

== Honours ==
Radnički Beograd

- Second League of Serbia and Montenegro: 2003–04

Bežanija

- Serbian First League: 2005–06

Al-Ahli

- Saudi Crown Prince Cup runner-up: 2006

FC Seoul

- K League 1: 2010, 2012, 2016
- Korean FA Cup runner-up: 2016
- Korean League Cup: 2010
- AFC Champions League runner-up: 2013

Suwon Samsung Bluewings

- Korean FA Cup: 2019

Kitchee

- Hong Kong Premier League: 2020–21, 2022–23
- Hong Kong Senior Challenge Shield: 2022–23
- Hong Kong FA Cup: 2022–23

Individual

- K League All-Star: 2007, 2009, 2013
- K League Players' Player of the Year: 2010
- Korean League Cup top goalscorer: 2010
- K League 1 Best XI: 2010, 2011, 2012, 2013
- K League 1 top goalscorer: 2011, 2012, 2013
- K League 1 Most Valuable Player: 2012
- K League FANtastic Player: 2012
- AFC Champions League Dream Team: 2013
- AFC Champions League All-Star Squad: 2016, 2018
- AFC Champions League Opta Best XI: 2018
- Hong Kong Premier League top goalscorer: 2020–21, 2022–23
- Hong Kong FA Footballer of the Year: 2020–21
- Hong Kong FA Top Footballers: 2020–21
- K League Hall of Fame: 2025

Records

- AFC Champions League all-time top goalscorer: 42 goals
