= Lee Kyu-ro =

South Korean footballer (born 1988)

Personal information
- Full name: Lee Kyu-ro
- Date of birth: August 20, 1988 (age 38)
- Place of birth: Sunchang, Jeollabuk-do, South Korea
- Height: 1.80 m (5 ft 11 in)
- Position: Full back

Team information
- Current team: Gimpo FC
- Number: 88

Senior career*
Years	Team	Apps	(Gls)
2007–2009	Chunnam Dragons	48	(5)
2010–2011	FC Seoul	16	(0)
2012	Incheon United	23	(1)
2013–2015	Jeonbuk Hyundai Motors	31	(0)
2016	Seoul E-Land FC	11	(2)
2016–2019	FC Seoul	26	(0)
2018–2019	→ Pocheon Citizen FC (loan)	?	(?)
2020–2021	Daejeon Hana Citizen	17	(0)
2021	Seoul E-Land FC	11	(0)
2022	Pocheon Citizen FC	9	(1)
2022-	Gimpo FC	17	(1)

International career
2010	South Korea	2	(0)
- * Club domestic league appearances and goals as of 14 October 2022

Lee Kyu-ro (Korean: 이규로; born August 20, 1988) is a South Korean football player who plays as a defender who plays for Gimpo FC of K League 2.

== Career ==
=== International career ===
On 9 January 2010, Lee made his first international cap for South Korea at the friendly match against Zambia.

== Personal life ==
On 21 December 2014, Lee married former Nine Muses member Bini after dating for two years.

== Honours ==
=== Club ===
Chunnam Dragons

- FA Cup Winner : 2007

FC Seoul

- K League 1 Winner : 2010
- League Cup Winner : 2010

Jeonbuk Hyundai Motors

- K League 1 Winner : 2014, 2015
