= Han Il-koo =

South Korean footballer (born 1987)

Han Il-Koo
Personal information
- Full name: Han Il-Koo
- Date of birth: 18 February 1987 (age 39)
- Place of birth: South Korea
- Height: 1.93 m (6 ft 4 in)
- Position: Goalkeeper

Team information
- Current team: FC Seoul
- Number: 23

Youth career
- 2006–2009: Korea University

Senior career*
Years	Team	Apps	(Gls)
2010–2014	FC Seoul	2	(0)
- * Club domestic league appearances and goals as of 30 November 2014

Han Il-Koo (Korean: 한일구; born 18 February 1987) is a South Korean former football goalkeeper who briefly played for FC Seoul in the K-League.

== Club career ==
Han was a supplementary selection from the K-League draft intake for FC Seoul for 2010, although he did not take to the field for the entire season. An injury to first choice keeper Kim Yong-Dae in early May, saw Han promoted to the senior starting lineup. His first match for his club was in the group phase of the 2011 AFC Champions League against United Arab Emirates club Al-Ain FC, in which he kept a clean sheet and ensuring qualification for FC Seoul to the knockout stages of the competition.

Four days later, Han marked his debut in the 2011 K-League by conceding three goals in his side's 4 - 3 dramatic win over Sangju Sangmu Phoenix. Kim Yong-Dae's return from injury in late May has seen Han relegated to the substitute bench.

== Club career statistics ==
As of 4 December 2013

Club performance			League		Cup		League Cup		Continental		Total	
Season	Club	League	Apps	Goals	Apps	Goals	Apps	Goals	Apps	Goals	Apps	Goals
South Korea			League		KFA Cup		League Cup		Asia		Total	
2010	FC Seoul	K-League	0	0	0	0	0	0	-		0	0
2011	FC Seoul	K-League	2	0	0	0	0	0	2	0	4	0
2012	FC Seoul	K-League	0	0	0	0	0	0	0	0	0	0
2013	FC Seoul	K-League Classic	0	0	0	0	0	0	0	0	0	0
Career total			2	0	0	0	0	0	2	0	4	0
