= Lee Kwang-jin =

South Korean footballer (born 1991)

Personal information
- Full name: Lee Kwang-jin
- Date of birth: 23 July 1991 (age 35)
- Place of birth: South Korea
- Height: 1.79 m (5 ft 10 1/2 in)
- Position: Midfielder

Team information
- Current team: Cheonan City FC
- Number: 8

Senior career*
Years	Team	Apps	(Gls)
2010–2013	FC Seoul	0	(0)
2011–2012	→ Daegu FC (loan)	1	(0)
2013	→ Gwangju FC (loan)	16	(4)
2014–2015	Daejeon Citizen	9	(0)
2015	Daegu FC	5	(0)
2016–2018	Suwon FC	67	(0)
2018–2023	Gyeongnam FC	102	(0)
2024–	Cheonan City FC	49	(1)
Korean name
Hangul	이광진
RR	I Gwangjin
MR	I Kwangjin
- * Club domestic league appearances and goals as of 7 January 2026

Lee Kwang-Jin (Korean: 이광진; born 23 July 1991) is a South Korean footballer who plays as midfielder for Cheonan City FC in K League 2.

== Career ==
He joined FC Seoul in 2010. but didn't make any appearance in FC Seoul.

He moved to Daejeon Citizen after a successful loan spell with Gwangju FC.
