= Jung Seung-yong =

South Korean footballer (born 1991)

Jung Seung-yong 정승용
Personal information
- Full name: Jung Seung-yong
- Date of birth: 25 March 1991 (age 35)
- Place of birth: Busan, South Korea
- Height: 1.82 m (5 ft 11 1/2 in)
- Position: Wing back

Team information
- Current team: Seongnam FC
- Number: 22

Youth career
- 2007–2009: FC Seoul

Senior career*
Years	Team	Apps	(Gls)
2010–2015	FC Seoul	2	(0)
2011	→ Gyeongnam FC (loan)	3	(0)
2016–2023	Gangwon FC	198	(6)
2023	→ Seongnam FC (Loan)	14	(1)
2024–	Seongnam FC	77	(1)

International career^{‡}
2010–2011	South Korea U-20	13	(2)
- * Club domestic league appearances and goals as of 6 August 2026 ‡ National team caps and goals as of 15 August 2011

Jung Seung-yong (Korean: 정승용) is a South Korean football wing back who plays for Seongnam FC.
