= Cho Beom-seok =

South Korean footballer (born 1990)

Personal information
- Full name: Cho Beom-seok
- Date of birth: 9 January 1990 (age 36)
- Place of birth: South Korea
- Height: 1.82 m (5 ft 11 1/2 in)
- Position: Midfielder

Team information
- Current team: Bucheon FC 1995
- Number: 15

Youth career
- 2005–2007: Shingal High School
- 2005–2006: → FC Metz (KFA Youth Project)

Senior career*
Years	Team	Apps	(Gls)
2008	Jeonnam Dragons	0	(0)
2009	FC Seoul	0	(0)
2011	Incheon United	3	(0)
2012–2015	Mokpo City	102	(7)
2016–	Bucheon FC	79	(1)
- * Club domestic league appearances and goals as of 15 November 2019

Cho Beom-seok (Korean: 조범석; born 9 January 1990) is a South Korean footballer who plays as midfielder for Bucheon FC in K League 2.

== Career ==
Cho was selected by Jeonnam Dragons in the 2008 K League draft, but he didn't made his debut for Jeonnam. He moved to FC Seoul after his first professional club released him.

Cho Beom-seok also had an unsuccessful spell with Incheon United in 2011, and joined Korea National League side Mokpo City.
