= Hyun Young-min =

South Korean footballer

Hyun Young-min 현영민
Personal information
- Date of birth: 25 December 1979 (age 46)
- Place of birth: Gurye, Jeonnam, South Korea
- Height: 1.79 m (5 ft 10 1/2 in)
- Positions: Full back; wingback; winger

Team information
- Current team: Ulsan Hyundai (U18 manager)

Youth career
- 1998–2001: Konkuk University

Senior career*
Years	Team	Apps	(Gls)
2002–2005	Ulsan Hyundai Horang-i	96	(3)
2006	Zenit Saint Petersburg	10	(0)
2007–2009	Ulsan Hyundai Horang-i	71	(0)
2010–2013	FC Seoul	69	(3)
2013	Seongnam Ilhwa Chunma	30	(1)
2014–2017	Jeonnam Dragons	121	(1)

International career
2002	South Korea U-23	3	(0)
2001–2004	South Korea	15	(0)

Managerial career
- 2022–: Ulsan Hyundai (U18)
Medal record
Representing South Korea
Men's football
Asian Games
Bronze medal – third place	2002 Busan	Team
- * Club domestic league appearances and goals

- Hyun Young-min
- Hangul: 현영민
- Hanja: 玄泳民
- RR: Hyeon Yeongmin
- MR: Hyŏn Yŏngmin

Hyun Young-min (born 25 December 1979) is a South Korean football coach and a former player. He is the manager of the Under-18 squad of Ulsan Hyundai.

== Career ==
=== Club career ===
Hyun Young-min started his career at Ulsan Hyundai Horang-i in Korea Republic. At the beginning of 2006 Russian club Rubin Kazan tried to sign him, but he refused to play outside two Russian metropolises, Saint Petersburg and Moscow. Shortly thereafter he moved to Zenit Saint Petersburg and he played for them until 2007. In 2007, he returned to Ulsan Hyundai Horang-i.

In December 2009, he was traded with FC Seoul's captain Kim Chi-Gon.

=== International career ===
He played for the Korea Republic national football team and was a participant at the 2002 FIFA World Cup.

== After retirement ==
In June 2021, Hyun signed a contract with DH Entertainment

== Club career statistics ==
Club performance			League		Cup		League Cup		Continental		Total	
Season	Club	League	Apps	Goals	Apps	Goals	Apps	Goals	Apps	Goals	Apps	Goals
South Korea			League		KFA Cup		League Cup		Asia		Total	
2002	Ulsan Hyundai Horang-i	K League 1	15	1	?	?	0	0	—			
2003	Ulsan Hyundai Horang-i	K League 1	32	1	4	0	—		—		36	1
2004	Ulsan Hyundai Horang-i	K League 1	23	1	4	0	4	0	—		31	1
2005	Ulsan Hyundai Horang-i	K League 1	26	0	1	0	12	0	—		39	0
Russia			League		Russian Cup		League Cup		Europe		Total	
2006	Zenit Saint Petersburg	Russian Premier League	10	0	4	0	—		3	1	17	1
South Korea			League		KFA Cup		League Cup		Asia		Total	
2007	Ulsan Hyundai Horang-i	K League 1	25	0	3	0	10	0	—		38	0
2008	Ulsan Hyundai Horang-i	K League 1	20	0	2	0	10	0	—		32	0
2009	Ulsan Hyundai Horang-i	K League 1	26	0	1	0	4	1	5	0	36	1
2010	FC Seoul	K League 1	27	1	2	1	6	0	—		35	2
2011	FC Seoul	K League 1	26	1	2	0	1	0	7	0	36	1
Total	South Korea		222	5	19	1	47	1	12	0	300	7
Total	Russia		10	0	4	0	—		3	1	17	1
Career total			232	5	23	1	47	1	15	1	317	8

== Honours ==
=== Club ===
Ulsan Hyundai Horang-i / Ulsan Hyundai FC

- K League Champion : 2005
- K League Runner-up : 2002, 2003
- League Cup Winner : 2007
- League Cup Runner-up : 2002, 2005

FC Seoul

- K League
  - Winners (1): 2010
- League Cup
  - Winners (1): 2010

=== International ===
- FIFA World Cup fourth place: 2002
- EAFF East Asian Cup (1) : 2003

== Filmography ==
=== Television show ===
Year	Title	Role	Ref.
2022	Army Three	Cast Member	
