= Choi Tae-uk =

South Korean footballer (born 1981)

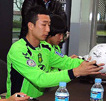
- Choi in 2009

Personal information
- Full name: Choi Tae-uk
- Date of birth: 13 March 1981 (age 45)
- Place of birth: Incheon, South Korea
- Height: 1.73 m (5 ft 8 in)
- Position: Winger

Youth career
- 1997–1999: Bupyeong High School

Senior career*
Years	Team	Apps	(Gls)
2000–2003	Anyang LG Cheetahs	96	(6)
2004	Incheon United	23	(5)
2005	Shimizu S-Pulse	25	(5)
2006–2007	Pohang Steelers	34	(1)
2008–2010	Jeonbuk Hyundai Motors	58	(15)
2010–2013	FC Seoul	67	(8)
2014	Ulsan Hyundai	1	(0)
Total		304	(40)

International career
1998–2000	South Korea U20	14	(11)
2000–2004	South Korea U23	39 (Note: Includes one appearance against non-national team.)	(14)
2000–2012	South Korea	30	(4)

Managerial career
- 2018–2022: South Korea (assistant)
Medal record
Representing South Korea
Men's football
Asian Games
Bronze medal – third place	2002 Busan	Team
- * Club domestic league appearances and goals

- Choi Tae-uk
- Hangul: 최태욱
- Hanja: 崔兌旭
- RR: Choe Taeuk
- MR: Ch'oe T'aeuk

Choi Tae-uk (Korean: 최태욱; born 13 March 1981) is a South Korean football coach and former player who is assistant coach of South Korea.

== Club career ==
Choi is a natural winger well known for his great speed. He was identified as a very promising talent in his childhood, and was selected by Anyang LG Cheetahs in the 2000 draft following his graduation from Bupyeong High School. Despite his early promise, his professional career at Anyang was particularly successful, playing as a wing-back together with then-teammate Lee Young-pyo.

After short spells playing for Incheon United and J1 League side Shimizu S-Pulse, Choi joined Pohang Steelers. Although one of the better paid players at Pohang, Choi was not given much of a chance under Brazilian coach Sergio Farias. This was largely because the Steelers concentrated on midfield play rather than the sidelines, with playmaker Andrezinho (known as Tavares in South Korea) playing a significant role. Choi was usually fielded as a substitute. Following the conclusion of the 2007 season, he transferred to Jeonbuk Hyundai Motors.

Choi retired from football in 2015 due to an injury.

== International career ==
At international level, Choi was part of the South Korean Olympic football team in 2004. At the Olympics, South Korea finished second in Group A, making it through to the next round, but was defeated by eventual silver medal winners Paraguay.

Choi was also a member of the South Korean World Cup team in 2002, but spent most of the tournament on the bench.

== Career statistics ==
=== Club ===
Appearances and goals by club, season and competition
Club	Season	League			National cup		League cup		Continental		Total	
Club	Season	Division	Apps	Goals	Apps	Goals	Apps	Goals	Apps	Goals	Apps	Goals
Anyang LG Cheetahs	2000	K League	12	1	2	0	4	0	2	0	20	1
Anyang LG Cheetahs	2001	K League	26	0	1	0	5	0	2	1	34	1
Anyang LG Cheetahs	2002	K League	22	2	0	0	0	0	2	0	24	2
Anyang LG Cheetahs	2003	K League	36	3	1	0	—		—		37	3
Anyang LG Cheetahs	Total		96	6	4	0	9	0	6	1	115	7
Incheon United	2004	K League	23	5	0	0	0	0	—		23	5
Shimizu S-Pulse	2005	J1 League	25	5	4	1	8	3	—		37	9
Pohang Steelers	2006	K League	21	1	1	0	4	1	—		26	2
Pohang Steelers	2007	K League	13	0	5	2	6	1	—		24	3
Pohang Steelers	Total		34	1	6	2	10	2	—		50	5
Jeonbuk Hyundai Motors	2008	K League	18	4	2	0	8	0	—		28	4
Jeonbuk Hyundai Motors	2009	K League	28	9	2	0	4	0	—		34	9
Jeonbuk Hyundai Motors	2010	K League	12	2	0	0	3	0	6	1	21	3
Jeonbuk Hyundai Motors	Total		58	15	4	0	15	0	6	1	83	16
FC Seoul	2010	K League	16	6	0	0	0	0	—		16	6
FC Seoul	2011	K League	13	0	1	0	0	0	2	1	16	1
FC Seoul	2012	K League	28	2	1	0	0	0	—		29	2
FC Seoul	2013	K League 1	10	0	2	0	—		4	0	16	0
FC Seoul	Total		67	8	4	0	0	0	6	1	77	9
Ulsan Hyundai	2014	K League 1	1	0	0	0	—		2	0	3	0
Career total			304	40	22	3	42	5	19	3	388	51

=== International ===
Appearances and goals by national team and year
National team	Year	Apps	Goals
South Korea	2000	4	2
South Korea	2001	6	1
South Korea	2002	10	1
South Korea	2003	5	0
South Korea	2005	2	0
South Korea	2009	2	0
South Korea	2012	1	0
Career total		30	4

Results list South Korea's goal tally first.

List of international goals scored by Choi Tae-uk
No.	Date	Venue	Opponent	Score	Result	Competition
1	7 April 2000	Seoul, South Korea	Mongolia	3–0	6–0	2000 AFC Asian Cup qualification
2	7 April 2000	Seoul, South Korea	Mongolia	6–0	6–0	2000 AFC Asian Cup qualification
3	10 November 2001	Seoul, South Korea	Croatia	1–0	2–0	Friendly
4	20 April 2002	Daegu, South Korea	Costa Rica	2–0	2–0	Friendly

== Honours ==
FC Seoul

- K League 1: 2000, 2010, 2012
- Korean FA Cup: 2002, 2009, 2010
- Korean League Cup: 2010
- Korean Super Cup: 2001
- AFC Champions League runner-up: 2001–02, 2013

Shimizu S-Pulse

- Emperor's Cup runner-up: 2005

Pohang Steelers

- K League 1: 2007
- Korean FA Cup runner-up: 2007

Jeonbuk Hyundai Motors

- K League 1: 2009

South Korea U23

- Asian Games bronze medal: 2002

Individual

- K League All-Star: 2001, 2002, 2003, 2004, 2009
- K League 1 Best XI: 2009
