= Lee Hyun-seung (footballer) =

South Korean footballer (born 1988)

Lee Hyun-Seung
Personal information
- Date of birth: 14 December 1988 (age 37)
- Place of birth: Suwon, Gyeonggi, South Korea
- Height: 1.72 m (5 ft 8 in)
- Positions: Attacking midfielder; winger; striker

Team information
- Current team: Bucheon FC

Senior career*
Years	Team	Apps	(Gls)
2006–2009	Jeonbuk Hyundai Motors	58	(7)
2010–2011	FC Seoul	1	(0)
2011	→ Jeonnam Dragons (loan)	24	(3)
2012–2014	Jeonnam Dragons	102	(7)
2015	Bucheon FC	17	(3)
2015–2017	Daejeon Citizen	20	(1)
2016–2017	→ Ansan Mugunghwa (army)	52	(10)
2018–	Bucheon FC	32	(1)

International career^{‡}
2006–2007	South Korea U-20	17	(0)
- * Club domestic league appearances and goals as of 1 January 2019 ‡ National team caps and goals as of 9 October 2009

Lee Hyun-Seung (born 14 December 1988) is a South Korean football player who currently plays for Bucheon FC.

On 17 January 2011, Lee Hyun-Seung joined Chunnam Dragons on loan from FC Seoul for 1 year and signed a permanent deal after his loan stint.

== Career statistics ==
Appearances and goals by club, season and competition
Club	Season	League			Korean FA Cup		K-League Cup		Asia		Total	
Club	Season	Division	Apps	Goals	Apps	Goals	Apps	Goals	Apps	Goals	Apps	Goals
Jeonbuk Hyundai Motors	2006	K-League	9	1	0	0	8	2	5	0	22	3
Jeonbuk Hyundai Motors	2007	K-League	19	1	0	0	9	0	0	0	28	1
Jeonbuk Hyundai Motors	2008	K-League	14	2	2	1	5	0	–		21	3
Jeonbuk Hyundai Motors	2009	K-League	17	3	4	1	3	1	–		24	5
Jeonbuk Hyundai Motors	Total		59	7	6	1	25	3	5	0	95	11
FC Seoul	2010	K-League	1	0	1	0	2	0	–		4	0
Chunnam Dragons	2011	K-League	24	3	2	0	4	1	–		30	4
Chunnam Dragons	2012	K-League							–			
Chunnam Dragons	Total											
Career total			84	10	9	2	31	4	5	0	129	16
