= Jo Su-huk =

South Korean footballer (born 1987)

Jo Su-Huk
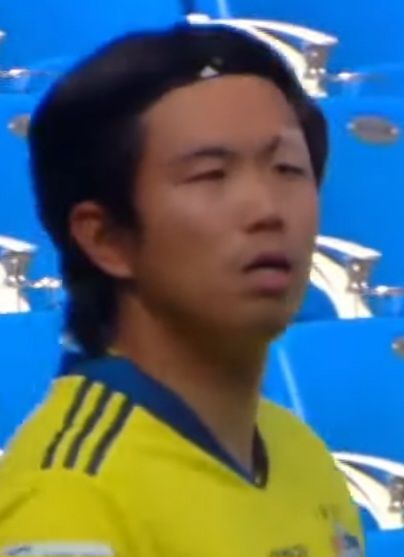

Personal information
- Date of birth: March 18, 1987 (age 39)
- Place of birth: Seoul, South Korea
- Height: 1.87 m (6 ft 2 in)
- Position: Goalkeeper

Team information
- Current team: Chungbuk Cheongju
- Number: 1

Youth career
- 2006–2008: Konkuk University

Senior career*
Years	Team	Apps	(Gls)
2008–2012	FC Seoul	0	(0)
2013–2016	Incheon United	36	(0)
2017–2024	Ulsan Hyundai	27	(0)
2025–	Chungbuk Cheongju	5	(0)

International career
2004–2006	South Korea U-17	1	(0)
2005–2007	South Korea U-20	20	(0)
Medal record
Ulsan Hyundai
Winner	AFC Champions League	2020
- * Club domestic league appearances and goals as of 7 January 2025

Jo Su-Huk (Korean: 조수혁; born March 18, 1987) is a South Korean professional footballer who currently plays as a goalkeeper for Chungbuk Cheongju.

== International career ==
He played for South Korea national under-20 football team at the 2006 AFC Youth Championship and at the 2007 FIFA U-20 World Cup.

== Club career statistics ==
Club performance			League		Cup		League Cup		Continental		Other		Total	
Season	Club	League	Apps	Goals	Apps	Goals	Apps	Goals	Apps	Goals	Apps	Goals	Apps	Goals
South Korea			League		KFA Cup		League Cup		Asia		Other		Total	
2008	FC Seoul	K League 1	0	0	0	0	2	0	-		-		2	0
2009	FC Seoul	K League 1	0	0	0	0	0	0	0	0	-		0	0
2010	FC Seoul	K League 1	0	0	0	0	0	0	-		-		0	0
2011	FC Seoul	K League 1	0	0	0	0	1	0	0	0	-		1	0
2012	FC Seoul	K League 1	0	0	0	0	0	0	-		-		0	0
2013	Incheon United	K League 1	0	0	1	0	-		-		-		1	0
2014	Incheon United	K League 1	0	0	1	0	-		-		-		1	0
2015	Incheon United	K League 1	10	0	2	0	-		-		-		12	0
2016	Incheon United	K League 1	26	0	2	0	-		-		-		28	0
2017	Ulsan Hyundai	K League 1	10	0	1	0	-		1	0	-		12	0
2018	Ulsan Hyundai	K League 1	8	0	4	0	-		1	0	-		13	0
2019	Ulsan Hyundai	K League 1	2	0	1	0	-		0	0	-		3	0
2020	Ulsan Hyundai	K League 1	0	0	0	0	-		9	0	-		9	0
2021	Ulsan Hyundai	K League 1	0	0	2	0	-		1	0	0	0	3	0
2022	Ulsan Hyundai	K League 1	3	0	2	0	-		1	0	-		6	0
Total	South Korea		59	0	14	0	3	0	13	0	0	0	91	0
Career total			59	0	14	0	3	0	13	0	0	0	91	0

== Honours ==
Ulsan Hyundai

- AFC Champions League: 2020
- K League 1: 2022, 2023, 2024
