= Lee Jong-min (footballer) =

South Korean footballer (born 1983)

Lee Jong-Min 이종민, 李宗珉
Personal information
- Full name: Lee Jong-Min,李宗珉
- Date of birth: 1 September 1983 (age 43)
- Place of birth: Jeju, South Korea
- Height: 1.75 m (5 ft 9 in)
- Positions: Right winger; right back

Senior career*
Years	Team	Apps	(Gls)
2002–2004	Suwon Bluewings	19	(0)
2005–2008	Ulsan Hyundai	62	(5)
2008–2012	FC Seoul	26	(0)
2011–2012	→ Sangju Sangmu (military service)	36	(0)
2013	Suwon Bluewings	7	(1)
2014–2017	Gwangju FC	100	(8)
2018–2019	Busan IPark	27	(0)

International career^{‡}
2002–2003	South Korea U-20	23	(4)
2006	South Korea U-23	4	(0)
2006–2008	South Korea	4	(0)
- * Club domestic league appearances and goals as of 12 November 2019 ‡ National team caps and goals as of 12 August 2010

- Lee Jong-min
- Hangul: 이종민
- Hanja: 李宗珉
- RR: I Jongmin
- MR: I Chongmin

Lee Jong-Min (born 1 September 1983) is a retired South Korean footballer.

== Club career statistics ==
Club performance			League		Cup		League Cup		Continental		Total	
Season	Club	League	Apps	Goals	Apps	Goals	Apps	Goals	Apps	Goals	Apps	Goals
South Korea			League		KFA Cup		League Cup		Asia		Total	
2002	Suwon Bluewings	K-League	0	0	?	?	0	0	?	?		
2003	Suwon Bluewings	K-League	16	0	0	0	-		-		16	0
2004	Suwon Bluewings	K-League	3	0	2	0	2	0	-		7	0
2005	Ulsan Hyundai	K-League	24	2	2	0	11	3	-		37	5
2006	Ulsan Hyundai	K-League	11	1	0	0	13	1	4	0	28	2
2007	Ulsan Hyundai	K-League	25	2	3	0	8	0	-		36	2
2008	Ulsan Hyundai	K-League	2	0	0	0	1	0	-		3	0
2008	FC Seoul	K-League	13	0	1	0	2	0	-		16	0
2009	FC Seoul	K-League	7	0	1	0	3	0	0	0	11	0
2010	FC Seoul	K-League	3	0	0	0	3	0	-		6	0
2011	Sangju Sangmu	K-League	21	0	0	0	2	0	-		23	0
Career total			125	5			45	4				

== Honors ==
=== Club ===
Suwon Samsung Bluewings

- K League (1) : 2004
- FA Cup (1) : 2002
- Asian Club Championship (1) : 2002
- Asian Super Cup (1) : 2002

Ulsan Hyundai

- K League (1) : 2005
- League Cup (1) : 2007
- Korean Super Cup (1) : 2006
- A3 Champions Cup (1) : 2006

FC Seoul

- K League (1) : 2010
- League Cup (1) : 2010
