= Choi Gi-bong =

South Korean footballer (born 1958)

Choi Gi-Bong 최기봉
Personal information
- Full name: Choi Gi-Bong
- Date of birth: November 13, 1958 (age 67)
- Place of birth: South Korea
- Height: 1.80 m (5 ft 11 in)
- Position: Midfielder

Team information
- Current team: FC Seoul

Youth career
- University of Seoul

Senior career*
Years	Team	Apps	(Gls)
1977–1979	Seoul City FC (Semi-professional)	?	(?)
1980–1982	Navy FC (Military service)	?	(?)
1983–1987	Yukong Elephants	108	(0)

Managerial career
- 1988–2004: Dae Shin High School
- 2005: FC Seoul Reserves
- 2006–2013: FC Seoul Chief Scout
- 2014: FC Seoul U-18 & U-15 Team
- * Club domestic league appearances and goals as of 4 February 2014 ‡ National team caps and goals as of 4 February 2014

Choi Gi-Bong (Korean: 최기봉, born November 13, 1958) is a South Korean former footballer.

He played in the K-League for the Yukong Elephants

== Honours ==
- K-League Best XI (1) : 1987
