= Park Yong-ho =

South Korean footballer (born 1981)

Park Yong-ho 박용호
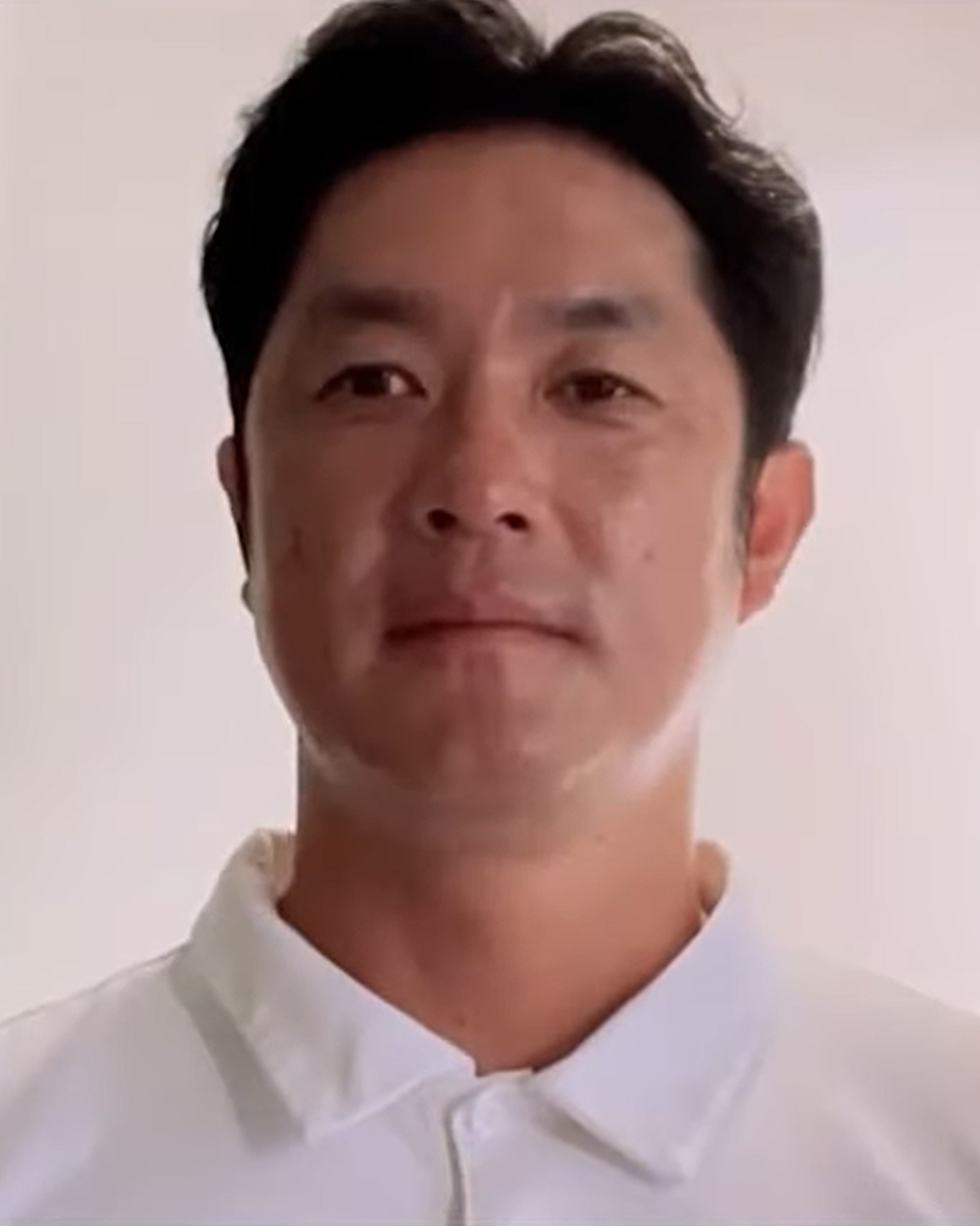
- Park in 2023

Personal information
- Date of birth: March 25, 1981 (age 45)
- Place of birth: Incheon, South Korea
- Height: 1.83 m (6 ft 0 in)
- Position: Centre-back

Senior career*
| Years | Team | Apps | (Gls) |
| 2000–2011 | Anyang LG Cheetahs / FC Seoul | 137 | (7) |
| 2005–2006 | → Gwangju Sangmu (military service) | 41 | (1) |
| 2012–2013 | Busan IPark | 57 | (4) |
| 2014 | ATM FA | 3 | (0) |
| 2015–2016 | Gangwon FC | 10 | (0) |

International career
| 1998–2000 | South Korea U20 | 12 | (3) |
| 2002–2004 | South Korea U23 | 26 | (1) |
| 2004 | South Korea | 1 | (0) |
Medal record
Representing South Korea
Men's football
Asian Games
| Bronze medal – third place | 2002 Busan | Team |
- * Club domestic league appearances and goals

- Park Yong-ho
- Hangul: 박용호
- Hanja: 朴容昊
- RR: Bak Yongho
- MR: Pak Yongho

Park Yong-ho (born March 25, 1981) is a retired South Korean football player who played as a central defender.

He was part of the South Korea football team in 2004 Summer Olympics, who finished second in Group A, making it through to the next round, before being defeated by silver medal winners Paraguay.

== Honors ==
=== Club ===
FC Seoul

- K League
  - Winners (1): 2000, 2010
- League Cup
  - Winners (1): 2010

Sporting positions
| Preceded by Kim Chi-gon | FC Seoul captain 2010–2011 | Succeeded by Ha Dae-sung |
