= Yeo Hyo-jin =

South Korean footballer (1983–2021)

Yeo Hyo-Jin
Personal information
- Date of birth: 25 April 1983
- Place of birth: South Korea
- Date of death: 31 July 2021 (aged 38)
- Place of death: South Korea
- Height: 1.88 m (6 ft 2 in)
- Position: Defender

Youth career
- 2002–2005: Korea University

Senior career*
Years	Team	Apps	(Gls)
2006–2011	FC Seoul	9	(0)
2007–2008	→ Gwangju Sangmu (army)	21	(2)
2010	→ Tochigi SC (loan)	28	(0)
2012	Busan IPark	0	(0)
2013–2015	Goyang Hi FC	71	(1)

International career
2002–2003	South Korea U-20	12	(0)
2004	South Korea U-23	1	(0)
- * Club domestic league appearances and goals

Yeo Hyo-Jin (Korean: 여효진; 25 April 1983 – 31 July 2021) was a South Korean professional footballer who played as a defender. He took part in the 2003 U-20 World Cup and 2004 Athens Summer Olympics. At the club level, he played for FC Seoul, Tochigi SC, Busan IPark, and Goyang Hi FC.

== Career statistics ==
Appearances and goals by club, season and competition
Club	Season	League			National Cup		League Cup		Continental		Total	
Club	Season	Division	Apps	Goals	Apps	Goals	Apps	Goals	Apps	Goals	Apps	Goals
FC Seoul	2006	K-League	0	0	0	0	0	0	–		0	0
FC Seoul	2009	K-League	0	0	0	0	0	0	0	0	0	0
FC Seoul	2011	K-League	9	0	2	0	0	0	4	0	15	0
FC Seoul	Total		9	0	2	0	0	0	4	0	15	0
Gwangju Sangmu (army)	2007	K-League	19	2	1	0	8	0	–		28	2
Gwangju Sangmu (army)	2008	K-League	2	0	0	0	2	0	–		4	0
Gwangju Sangmu (army)	Total		21	2	1	0	10	0	0	0	32	2
Tochigi SC (loan)	2010	J2 League	28	4	2	0	–		–		30	4
Busan IPark	2012	K-League	0	0	0	0	–		–		0	0
Goyang Hi FC	2013	K League Challenge	14	0	1	0	–		–		15	0
Goyang Hi FC	2014	K League Challenge	30	1	0	0	–		–		30	1
Goyang Hi FC	2015	K League Challenge	27	0	0	0	–		–		27	0
Goyang Hi FC	Total		71	1	1	0	0	0	0	0	72	1
Career total			129	7	6	0	10	0	4	0	149	7
