= Bae Hae-min =

South Korean footballer (born 1988)

Bae Hae-Min
Personal information
- Full name: Bae Hae-Min
- Date of birth: 25 April 1988 (age 38)
- Place of birth: Masan, South Korea
- Height: 1.83 m (6 ft 0 in)
- Position: Midfielder

Team information
- Current team: Yongin City FC
- Number: 28

Youth career
- 2004–2006: FC Seoul

Senior career*
Years	Team	Apps	(Gls)
2007–2011	FC Seoul	3	(0)
2008–2009	→ FK Viktoria Žižkov (loan)	0	(0)
2008–2009	→ FK Viktoria Žižkov B (loan)	16	(2)
2012	Daejeon KHNP	13	(1)
2014	Yongin City	11	(3)
2014	Pocheon FC		
2015	Goyang Hi FC	13	(1)
2016–	Yongin City FC	0	(0)

International career
2005	South Korea U-17	4	(2)
- * Club domestic league appearances and goals as of 20 December 2015

Bae Hae-Min (Korean: 배해민; born 25 April 1988) is a South Korean footballer. He currently plays as a midfielder for Goyang Hi FC in K League Challenge.

He began his club career in South Korea with K-League side FC Seoul. He made his debut in the Hauzen Cup, a league cup competition operated by the K-League, in May 2008 however he moved on loan to Czech Republic side FK Viktoria Žižkov later that year. Bae made his regular league debut for FC Seoul in May 2011 in a home game against Gyeongnam FC when he came on as a substitute. He would go on to make two further substitute appearances in the league as well as a start in the league cup competition that season before he left the club.

Bae signed for Korea National League side Daejeon KHNP for the 2012 season but spent just one year with the club. He signed for National League club Yongin City ahead of the 2014 season.
