= Ou Kyoung-jun =

South Korean footballer (born 1987)

Ou Kyoung-Jun
Personal information
- Full name: Ou Kyoung-Jun
- Date of birth: 10 December 1987 (age 38)
- Place of birth: Seoul, South Korea
- Height: 1.77 m (5 ft 10 in)
- Position: Winger

Youth career
- 2002: Yonggang Middle School
- 2002–2003: FC Metz (KFA Youth Project)
- 2003–2004: FC Metz

Senior career*
Years	Team	Apps	(Gls)
2004–2007	FC Metz B		
2007–2009	FC Metz	1	(0)
2008–2009	→ Seongnam Ilhwa (loan)	7	(0)
2009–2011	FC Seoul	10	(0)
2010	→ Daejeon Citizen (loan)	16	(4)
Total		34	(4)

International career
2003	South Korea U-17	3	(0)
- * Club domestic league appearances and goals as of 25 August 2011

Ou Kyoung-Jun (Korean: 어경준; born 10 December 1987) is a South Korean footballer.

== Club career ==
=== FC Metz ===
Born in Seoul, South Korea, Ou began his football career at Yonggang Middle School and entered the Korea Football Association Outstanding Players Study Abroad Project, resulting in him moving to France by joining Ligue 1 side FC Metz, along with Kang Jin-wook as part of the club's partnership with the project. It was announced on 18 April 2003 that he signed a formal agreement on a two–year contract. In June 2004, he signed another contract with the club. He began to progress and development through the youth system of FC Metz before temporally returning to South Korea for military service.

Having spent five years at the FC Metz's youth system, Ou signed his first professional contract with the club on 1 August 2007. A year before, he signed an additional contract, keeping him until 2010. He made his FC Metz debut, coming on as a late substitute, in a 3–1 loss against OGC Nice on 20 October 2007, which turns out to be his only appearance for the club. During his time there, Ou began learning French but struggled despite spending five years in the country and later his mother and younger brother joined him in France.

It was announced on 31 July 2008 that Ou has signed loan to South Korean K-League club Seongnam Ilhwa Chunma for 1-year deal. He made his Seongnam debut on 5 November 2008 against Pohang Steelers in quarter–finals of the Korea FA Cup, as they lost 8–7 on penalty shootout following a 1–1 draw. Ou later made his league debut for the side in the opening game of the season, in a 1–1 draw against Daegu. By the time he departed from the club, Ou made eleven appearances in all competitions for the side.

=== FC Seoul ===
In July 2009, Ou moved to K-League side FC Seoul on a permanent basis. Upon joining the club, Lee Young-jin said of the move: "As a player who has been watching Seoul with interest early, he has steadily checked his condition even after entering France. I know that Kyung-Joon Eo is wearing the Seoul uniform as a result of his active determination to join the team."

Ou made his FC Seoul debut in the AFC Champions League quarter–finals of the first leg against Umm Salal, coming on in the 64th minute in a 3–1 loss. He made another AFC Champions League appearance in the second leg, coming on in the 66th minute in a 1–1 draw, resulting in FC Seoul's elimination from the tournament. On 4 October 2009, Ou made his league debut for FC Seoul, coming on in the 69th minute in a 2–0 win against Jeju United. At the end of the 2009 season, he made three appearances for the side.

After making two appearances for FC Seoul in the first half of the 2010 season, it was announced on 13 July 2010 that Ou joined Daejeon Citizen for the rest of the 2010 season. He made his Daejeon Citizen debut, coming on as a second half substitute, in a 4–0 win against Jeonbuk Hyundai Motors on 17 July 2010. On 7 August 2010, Ou scored his first goal for the club, in a 3–1 win against Daegu. After the match, he was named the league's Best Eleven. Ou later scored three more goals in the 2010 season. Having received first team football for Daejeon Citizen, he went on to make sixteen appearances and scoring four times for the side.

After his loan spell at Daejeon Citizen came to an end, Ou returned to FC Seoul and soon received more playing time at the start of the 2011 season. He made his FC Seoul return against Suwon Samsung Bluewings in the opening game of the season, coming on as a late substitute, in a 2–0 loss. Ten days later on 15 March 2011, Ou scored his first FC Seoul goal in the AFC Champions League match against Zhejiang Greentown, which resulted in the club winning 3–0. By the time he was involved in a match fixing scandal, he made ten appearances and scoring once in all competitions. Ou was involved in a related 2011 match fixing scandal and was officially announced in August 2011 that he would not be able to play in the all league systems in South Korea permanently. In addition, Ou was fined for (7 million won) and charged in addition fee (7 million won). Following this, his career ended and said he has been pursuing a different career.

== International career ==
He started been capped at the South Korea U17, including being a part of 2003 FIFA U-17 World Championship for South Korea's squad.

Choi was then capped for the South Korea U20 squad throughout 2006.

== Club career statistics ==
Last update: 25 July 2011

Club performance			League		Cup		League Cup		Continental		Total	
Season	Club	League	Apps	Goals	Apps	Goals	Apps	Goals	Apps	Goals	Apps	Goals
France			League		Coupe de France		Coupe de la Ligue		Europe		Total	
2007-08	Metz	Ligue 1	1	0	0	0	0	0	-		1	0
South Korea			League		KFA Cup		League Cup		Asia		Total	
2008	Seongnam Ilhwa Chunma	K-League	0	0	1	0	0	0	-		1	0
2009	Seongnam Ilhwa Chunma	K-League	7	0	0	0	4	0	-		11	0
2009	FC Seoul	K-League	1	0	0	0	0	0	2	0	3	0
2010	FC Seoul	K-League	1	0	0	0	0	0	-		1	0
2010	Daejeon Citizen	K-League	16	4	0	0	0	0	-		16	4
2011	FC Seoul	K-League	8	0	0	0	1	0	2	1	11	1
Total	France		1	0	0	0	0	0	-		1	0
Total	South Korea		33	4	1	0	5	0	4	1	43	5
Career total			34	4	1	0	5	0	4	1	44	5
