= 2012 Jeju United FC season =

Jeju United
2012 season
- Chairman: Koo Ja-Young
- Manager: Park Kyung-Hoon
- K-League: 6th
- Korean FA Cup: Semi-final
- Top goalscorer: League: Santos (13); Jair (13); All: Santos (14); Jair (14)
- Highest home attendance: 10,117 vs Sangju (May 27)
- Lowest home attendance: 3,244 vs Gyeongnam (April 29)
- Average home league attendance: 6,780 (as of May 27)
| Home colours | Away colours |

The 2012 season was Jeju United FC's thirtieth season in the K-League in South Korea. Jeju United FC will be competing in the K-League and Korean FA Cup.

== Current squad ==
Note: Flags indicate national team as defined under FIFA eligibility rules; some limited exceptions apply. Players may hold more than one non-FIFA nationality.

| No. | Pos. | Nation | Player |
|---|---|---|---|
| 1 | GK | KOR | Lee Jin-Hyung |
| 2 | DF | KOR | Park Jin-Ok |
| 3 | DF | KOR | Yoon Won-Il |
| 4 | DF | AUS | Adrian Madaschi |
| 5 | DF | KOR | Park Byeong-Ju |
| 6 | DF | KOR | Choi Won-Kwon (captain) |
| 7 | MF | KOR | Kwon Soon-Hyung |
| 8 | MF | KOR | Oh Seung-Bum |
| 9 | FW | BRA | Robert |
| 11 | FW | BRA | Jair |
| 13 | MF | KOR | Jung Kyung-ho |
| 14 | FW | KOR | Song Ho-Young |
| 15 | DF | KOR | Hong Jung-Ho |
| 16 | DF | KOR | Ma Chul-Jun |
| 17 | DF | KOR | Heo Jae-Won |
| 18 | FW | KOR | Kang Su-Il |
| 19 | GK | KOR | Jeon Tae-Hyun |
| 20 | FW | KOR | Seo Dong-Hyun |
| 21 | GK | KOR | Han Dong-Jin |

| No. | Pos. | Nation | Player |
|---|---|---|---|
| 22 | MF | KOR | Yang Joon-A |
| 23 | MF | KOR | Ahn Jong-Hun |
| 24 | FW | KOR | Nam Joon-Jae |
| 25 | FW | KOR | Kim Jun-Yub |
| 26 | DF | KOR | Oh Ban-Suk |
| 27 | MF | KOR | Jeong Seok-Min |
| 28 | MF | KOR | Noh Sung-Chan |
| 29 | MF | KOR | Jin Dae-Sung |
| 30 | FW | KOR | Bae Il-Hwan |
| 31 | GK | KOR | Kim Sun-Jin |
| 32 | MF | KOR | Jang Jeong-Hyun |
| 33 | DF | KOR | Han Yong-Su |
| 34 | DF | KOR | Lee Sung-Hyun |
| 35 | DF | KOR | Kwon Yong-Nam |
| 36 | FW | KOR | Shin Young-Rok |
| 37 | MF | KOR | Song Jin-Hyung |
| 38 | FW | KOR | Lee Sang-Hyup |
| 39 | FW | BRA | Santos |

=== Out on loan ===
Note: Flags indicate national team as defined under FIFA eligibility rules; some limited exceptions apply. Players may hold more than one non-FIFA nationality.

| No. | Pos. | Nation | Player |
|---|---|---|---|
| 10 | FW | KOR | Shim Young-Sung (to Gangwon FC until 14 December 2012) |

== Transfer ==
=== In ===
| No. | Pos. | Nation | Player |
|---|---|---|---|
| — | FW | KOR | Seo Dong-Hyun (from Gangwon FC) |
| — | MF | KOR | Kwon Soon-Hyung (from Gangwon FC) |
| — | FW | KOR | Song Ho-Young (from Seongnam Ilhwa Chunma) |
| — | MF | KOR | Lee Sang-Hyup (loan return from Daejeon Citizen) |
| — | FW | KOR | Jeong Seok-Min (from Pohang Steelers) |
| — | MF | KOR | Jung Kyung-ho (Free agent, former Chunnam Dragons) |
| — | DF | KOR | Park Byeong-Ju (Free agent, former Gwangju FC) |
| — | DF | KOR | Heo Jae-Won (Free agent, former Gwangju FC) |
| — | FW | BRA | Robert (from (Brazil) Avaí) |

| No. | Pos. | Nation | Player |
|---|---|---|---|
| — | DF | AUS | Adrian Madaschi (from (Australia) Melbourne Heart) |
| — | MF | KOR | Song Jin-Hyung (from (France) Tours FC) |
| — | DF | KOR | Han Yong-Su (drafted) |
| — | FW | KOR | Jin Dae-Sung (drafted) |
| — | DF | KOR | Jang Jeong-Hyun (drafted) |
| — | GK | KOR | Kim Sun-Jin (drafted) |
| — | MF | KOR | Noh Sung-Chan (drafted) |
| — | DF | KOR | Lee Sung-Hyun (drafted) |

=== Out ===
| No. | Pos. | Nation | Player |
|---|---|---|---|
| 1 | GK | KOR | Kim Ho-Jun (to Sangju Sangmu Phoenix, army) |
| 3 | DF | KOR | Kang Min-hyuk (to Gyeongnam FC) |
| 7 | MF | KOR | Kim Young-Sin (to Sangju Sangmu Phoenix, army) |
| 14 | MF | KOR | Kim Tae-Min (to Gangwon FC) |
| 16 | FW | KOR | Bae Ki-Jong (to National Police Agency FC, army) |
| 18 | FW | KOR | Kim Eun-Jung (to Gangwon FC) |
| 22 | FW | KOR | Lee Hyun-Ho (to Seongnam Ilhwa Chunma) |

| No. | Pos. | Nation | Player |
|---|---|---|---|
| 23 | FW | KOR | Han Jae-Man (released, to Mokpo City FC) |
| 24 | MF | KOR | Jung Da-Seul (released, to Goyang Kookmin Bank FC) |
| 25 | DF | KOR | Kang Joon-U (released, due to military duty) |
| 28 | FW | BRA | Felipinho (loan return to (Brazil) SC Internacional B) |
| 36 | DF | KOR | Kang Min-Sung (contract terminated) |
| 38 | DF | KOR | Lee Yoon-Ho (released) |
| 43 | MF | KOR | Moon Min-Kui (released) |

== Coaching staff ==
| Position | Staff |
|---|---|
| Manager | (South Korea) Park Kyung-Hoon |
| Assistant Manager | (South Korea) Lee Do-Young |
| Coach | (South Korea) Kim Young-min |
| Coach | (South Korea) Choi Young-jun |
| GK Coach | (South Korea) Lee Chung-Ho |
| Scouter | (South Korea) Park Dong-Woo |

Last updated: 28 March 2012
Source: Jeju United FC

== Match results ==
=== K-League ===
All times are Korea Standard Time (KST) – UTC+9

| Date Round | Home | Score | Away | Location |

| 4 March 1 | Jeju | 3–1 | Incheon | Seogwipo, Jeju |
| 15:00 | Bae Il-Hwan 29' (Assist by No.37); Santos 67' (Assist by No.11); Jair 75' (Assist by No.39) | Report | Koo Bon-Sang (yellow card) 52' (yellow-red card) 65'; Kim Tae-Yoon 89' | Stadium: Jeju World Cup Stadium; Attendance: 6,202; Referee: Lee Min-Hu |

| 10 March 2 | Busan | 1–1 | Jeju | Yeonje-gu, Busan |
| 17:00 | Bang Seung-Hwan 41' | Report | Kim Chang-Soo 58' (o.g.) | Stadium: Busan Asiad Stadium; Attendance: 7,487; Referee: Yoo Sun-Ho |

| 18 March 3 | Gwangju | 3–2 | Jeju | Nam-gu, Gwangju |
| 17:00 | Kim Dong-Sub 2'; João Paulo 88' (pen.); Adriano Chuva 90+2' | Report | Bae Il-Hwan 20'; Bae Il-Hwan 2' (Assist by No.37) | Stadium: Gwangju World Cup Stadium; Attendance: 3,020; Referee: An Yong-Hee |

| 24 March 4 | Jeju | 2–1 | Suwon | Seogwipo, Jeju |
| 15:00 | Robert 53' (Assist by No.39); Seo Dong-Hyun 61' (Assist by No.39) | Report | Éverton 27' | Stadium: Jeju World Cup Stadium; Attendance: 6,419; Referee: Kim Jong-hyeok |

| 1 April 5 | Daejeon | 0–3 | Jeju | Yuseong-gu, Daejeon |
| 17:00 | | Report | Seo Dong-Hyun 12' (Assist by No.11); Santos 23' (pen.); Seo Dong-Hyun 72' | Stadium: Daejeon World Cup Stadium; Attendance: 2,448; Referee: Lee Dong-Jun |

| 7 April 6 | Jeju | 2–0 | Daegu | Seogwipo, Jeju |
| 17:00 | Robert 64' (Assist by No.17); Jair 85' | Report | | Stadium: Jeju World Cup Stadium; Attendance: 5,063; Referee: Mae Ho-Young |

| 11 April 7 | Jeju | 0–0 | Ulsan | Seogwipo, Jeju |
| 15:00 | | Report | | Stadium: Jeju World Cup Stadium; Attendance: 7,086; Referee: Lee Jong-Guk |

| 14 April 8 | Pohang | 2–3 | Jeju | Pohang, Gyeongbuk |
| 15:00 | Asamoah 27'; Zicu 57' | Report | Santos 21' (Assist by No.20); Jair 43' (Assist by No.39); Santos 45'; Park Byeong-Ju (yellow card) 81' (yellow-red card) 90+1' | Stadium: Pohang Steel Yard; Attendance: 8,747; Referee: Ko Keum-Bok |

| 21 April 9 | Seoul | 1–1 | Jeju | Mapo-gu, Seoul |
| 15:00 UTC+9 | Kim Hyun-Sung 76' | Report | Santos 90+3' (Assist by No.17) | Stadium: Seoul World Cup Stadium; Attendance: 8,228; Referee: Yoo Sun-Ho |

| 29 April 10 | Jeju | 3–1 | Gyeongnam | Seogwipo, Jeju |
| 17:00 UTC+9 | Song Jin-Hyung 4' (Assist by No.39); Robert 53'; Jair 62' | Report | Jordán 81' | Stadium: Jeju World Cup Stadium; Attendance: 3,244; Referee: Moon Jin-Hee |

| 5 May 11 | Seongnam | 1–1 | Jeju | Seongnam, Gyeonggi |
| 15:00 | Hong Chul (red card) 55'; Lim Jong-Eun 80' | Report | Song Jin-Hyung 77' (Assist by No.11) | Stadium: Tancheon Sports Complex; Attendance: 4,543; Referee: Lee Jong-Guk |

| 13 May 12 | Jeju | 4–2 | Gangwon | Seogwipo, Jeju |
| 15:00 | Jair 9' (Assist by No.39); Jair 35' (Assist by No.39); Santos 49' (Assist by No.11); Jair 82' (pen.) | Report | Wesley 32'; Kim Eun-Jung 37' (pen.) | Stadium: Jeju World Cup Stadium; Attendance: 9,330; Referee: Choi Myung-Yong |

| 19 May 13 | Chunnam | 1–0 | Jeju | Gwangyang, Jeonnam |
| 16:40 | Son Seol-Min 14' | Report | | Stadium: Gwangyang Football Stadium; Attendance: 3,583; Referee: Kim Jong-Hyuk |

| 27 May 14 | Jeju | 2–1 | Sangju | Seogwipo, Jeju |
| 15:00 | Oh Ban-Suk 20'; Santos 68' | Report | Kim Young-Sin 18' | Stadium: Jeju World Cup Stadium; Attendance: 10,117; Referee: Ko Keum-Bok |

| 13 June 15 | Jeju | 1–3 | Jeonbuk | Seogwipo, Jeju |
| 19:00 | Song Jin-Hyung 59' | Report | Jeong Shung-Hoon 10'; Huang Bowen 39'; Kim Hyun 90' | Stadium: Jeju World Cup Stadium; Attendance: 6,590; Referee: Lee Dong-Jun |

| 17 June 16 | Suwon | 1–1 | Jeju | Suwon, Gyeonggi |
| 19:00 | Song Jin-Hyung 24' (o.g.) | Report | Jair 66' (Assist by No.37) | Stadium: Suwon World Cup Stadium; Attendance: 23,593; Referee: Kim Jong-Hyuk |

| 23 June 17 | Jeju | 0–1 | Pohang | Seogwipo, Jeju |
| 19:00 | | Report | Lee Myung-Joo 84'; Shin Hwa-Yong (red card) 90+4' | Stadium: Jeju World Cup Stadium; Attendance: 6,227; Referee: Choi Myung-Yong |

| 27 June 18 | Jeju | 5–2 | Busan | Seogwipo, Jeju |
| 19:00 | Jair 11' (Free kick); Santos 36' (Assist by No.37); Seo Dong-Hyun 57' (Assist by No.39); Jair 60'; Santos 63' (Assist by No.11) | Report(English); Report(Korean) | Éder Baiano (yellow card) 14' (yellow-red card) 33'; Han Ji-Ho 49'; Yoon Dong-Min 79' | Stadium: Jeju World Cup Stadium; Attendance: 2,762; Referee: Kim Sung-Ho |

| 30 June 19 | Daegu | 2–0 | Jeju | Suseong-gu, Daegu |
| 19:00 | Leandro Lima 36'; Dinélson 62' | English Report | | Stadium: Daegu Stadium; Attendance: 4,439; Referee: Hong Jin-Ho |

| 12 July 20 | Ulsan | 2–2 | Jeju | Nam-gu, Ulsan |
| 19:00 | Kim Shin-Wook 34'; Lee Keun-Ho 53' | | Seo Dong-Hyun 2'; Song Jin-Hyung 90+1' | Stadium: Ulsan Munsu Football Stadium |

| 15 July 21 | Jeju | 4–1 | Daejeon | Seogwipo, Jeju |
| 19:00 | Santos 27'; Song Jin-Hyung 28', 66'; Seo Dong-Hyun 63' | Report(Eng); Report(Kor) | Baba 89' (pen.) | Stadium: Jeju World Cup Stadium; Attendance: 5,483; Referee: Ko Keum-Bok |

| 21 July 22 | Jeju | 6–0 | Chunnam | Seogwipo, Jeju |
| 19:00 | Santos 18'; Song Jin-Hyung 33'; Jair 37'; Seo Dong-Hyun 45', 58', 87' (pen.) | Report | | Stadium: Jeju World Cup Stadium; Attendance: 6,917; Referee: Ko Hyung-Jin |

| 25 July 23 | Gyeongnam | 3–1 | Jeju | Changwon, Gyeongnam |
| 19:30 | Luke DeVere 55', 61'; Yun Il-Rok 76' | Report(Eng); Report(Kor) | Park Jin-Ok (yellow card) 51'; Song Jin-Hyung (yellow card) 64'; Oh Ban-Suk (yellow card) 78'; Park Byeong-Ju (yellow card) 89'; Santos 90+1' | Stadium: Changwon Football Center; Attendance: 1,653; Referee: Kim Sang-Woo |

| 28 July 24 | Jeju | 3–3 | Seoul | Seogwipo, Jeju |
| 19:00 | Santos 4'; Han Yong-Su (yellow card) 8'; Han Dong-Jin (yellow card) 14'; Bae Il-Hwan 26'; Seo Dong-Hyun (yellow card) 57'; Jair 64' | Report(Eng); Report(Kor) | Molina 31'; Dejan Damjanović 40', 49'; Kim Ju-Young (yellow card) 57' | Stadium: Jeju World Cup Stadium; Attendance: 16,910; Referee: Ahn Yong-Hee |

| 4 August 25 | Sangju | 2–1 | Jeju | Sangju, Gyeongbuk |
| 19:00 | Choi Chul-Soon (yellow card) 50'; Lee Sang-Hyup 77', 80'; Yoo Chang-Hyun (yellow card) 86' (yellow-red card) 90+3' | Report(Eng); Report(Kor) | Kwon Soon-Hyung 37'; Park Byeong-Ju (yellow card) 61' | Stadium: Sangju Civic Stadium; Attendance: 2,304; Referee: Woo Sang-Il |

| 8 August 26 | Gangwon | 1–1 | Jeju | Gangneung, Gangwon |
| 19:30 | Wesley (yellow card) 40'; Bae Hyo-Sung 68'; Kim Keun-Bae 90+1' | Report(Eng); Report(Kor) | Kim Jun-Yub (yellow card) 40' (yellow-red card) 59'; Kwon Soon-Hyung (yellow card) 68'; Jair 90+3' (pen.) | Stadium: Gangneung Stadium; Attendance: 2,511; Referee: Kim Dong-Jin |

| 11 August 27 | Jeju | 0–2 | Gwangju | Seogwipo, Jeju |
| 19:00 | Seo Dong-Hyun (yellow card) 68' | Report(Eng); Report(Kor) | Kim Dong-Sub 28'; Lee Yong (yellow card) 68'; Park Gi-Dong 79'; Park Ho-Jin (yellow card) 88' | Stadium: Jeju World Cup Stadium; Attendance: 8,194; Referee: Kim Jong-Hyuk |

| 19 August 28 | Jeonbuk | – | Jeju | Jeonju, Jeonbuk |
| 19:00 | | | | Stadium: Jeonju World Cup Stadium |

| 23 August 29 | Jeju | – | Seongnam | Seogwipo, Jeju |
| 19:00 | | | | Stadium: Jeju World Cup Stadium |

| 26 August 30 | Incheon | – | Jeju | Nam-gu, Incheon |
| 19:00 | | | | Stadium: Incheon Football Stadium |

==== League table ====
| Pos | Team | Pld | W | D | L | GF | GA | GD | Pts | Qualification or relegation |
|---|---|---|---|---|---|---|---|---|---|---|
| 4 | Suwon Samsung Bluewings | 44 | 20 | 13 | 11 | 61 | 51 | +10 | 73 | Qualification for the Champions League (Note: Pohang Steelers finished the league in third place after qualifying for the Champions League as winners of the FA Cup: therefore, the spot given to the third-placed team was passed to the Suwon Samsung Bluewings, the fourth-placed team.) |
| 5 | Ulsan Hyundai | 44 | 18 | 14 | 12 | 60 | 52 | +8 | 68 | |
| 6 | Jeju United | 44 | 16 | 15 | 13 | 71 | 56 | +15 | 63 | |
| 7 | Busan IPark | 44 | 13 | 14 | 17 | 40 | 51 | −11 | 53 | |
| 8 | Gyeongnam FC | 44 | 14 | 8 | 22 | 50 | 60 | −10 | 50 | |

Source: K League
Rules for classification: 1) Points; 2) Goal difference; 3) Goals scored.

==== Results summary ====
| Overall | | | | | | | | Home | | | | | | Away | | | | | |
| Pld | W | D | L | GF | GA | GD | Pts | W | D | L | GF | GA | GD | W | D | L | GF | GA | GD |
|---|---|---|---|---|---|---|---|---|---|---|---|---|---|---|---|---|---|---|---|
| 26 | 11 | 8 | 7 | 52 | 36 | +16 | 41 | 9 | 2 | 2 | 35 | 16 | +19 | 2 | 6 | 5 | 17 | 20 | −3 |

==== Results by round ====
| Round | 1 | 2 | 3 | 4 | 5 | 6 | 7 | 8 | 9 | 10 | 11 | 12 | 13 | 14 | 15 | 16 | 17 | 18 | 19 | 20 | 21 | 22 | 23 | 24 | 25 | 26 | 27 | 28 | 29 | 30 | 31 | 32 | 33 | 34 | 35 | 36 | 37 | 38 | 39 | 40 | 41 | 42 | 43 | 44 |
|---|---|---|---|---|---|---|---|---|---|---|---|---|---|---|---|---|---|---|---|---|---|---|---|---|---|---|---|---|---|---|---|---|---|---|---|---|---|---|---|---|---|---|---|---|
| Ground | H | A | A | H | A | H | H | A | A | H | A | H | A | H | H | A | H | H | A | A | H | H | A | H | A | A | H | A | H | A | | | | | | | | | | | | | | |
| Result | W | D | L | W | W | W | D | W | D | W | D | W | L | W | L | D | L | W | L | D | W | W | L | D | L | D | L | | | | | | | | | | | | | | | | | |
| Position | 2 | 4 | 6 | 5 | 3 | 1 | 2 | 2 | 2 | 2 | 3 | 2 | 3 | 3 | 4 | 4 | 4 | 4 | 5 | 5 | 5 | 5 | 5 | 5 | 5 | 5 | | | | | | | | | | | | | | | | | | |

Updated to match(es) played on 9 August 2012. Source: League Fixtures and Results
A = Away; H = Home; W = Win; D = Draw; L = Loss

=== Korean FA Cup ===
| 23 May Round of 32 | Jeju United | 2–1 | Incheon Korail | Seogwipo, Jeju |
| 19:00 KST | Shim Young-Sung 41' (Assist by No.39); Jair 56' (Assist by No.20) | | Lee Seung-Hwan 70' | Stadium: Jeju World Cup Stadium; Attendance: 750; Referee: Jeong Dong-Sik |

| 20 June Round of 16 | Jeju United | 2–0 | Daegu FC | Seogwipo, Jeju |
| 19:00 KST | Seo Dong-Hyun 32' (Assist by No.8); Santos 87' (Assist by No.20) | | | Stadium: Jeju World Cup Stadium; Attendance: 853; Referee: Choi Dae-Woo |

| 1 August Quarterfinal | Daejeon Citizen | 1–2 | Jeju United | Yuseong-gu, Daejeon |
| 19:30 KST | Kevin Oris 89' | Report | Seo Dong-Hyun 9'; Bae Il-Hwan 41' | Stadium: Daejeon World Cup Stadium |

| 1 September 2012 Semi-final | Pohang Steelers | 2–1 | Jeju United | Pohang |
| 19:00 KST | Hwang Jin-sung 3'; Han Yong-su 78' (o.g.) | | Jair 18' | Stadium: Pohang Steel Yard; Attendance: 16,114 |

== Squad statistics ==
=== Appearances ===
Statistics accurate as of match played 27 June 2012

| No. | Nat. | Pos. | Name | League | | FA Cup | | Appearances | | Goals |
| No. | Nat. | Pos. | Name | Apps | Goals | Apps | Goals | App (sub) | Total | Goals |
|---|---|---|---|---|---|---|---|---|---|---|
| 1 | (South Korea) | GK | Lee Jin-Hyung | 0 | 0 | 1 | 0 | 1 (0) | 1 | 0 |
| 2 | (South Korea) | DF | Park Jin-Ok | 8 (1) | 0 | 1 (1) | 0 | 9 (2) | 11 | 0 |
| 3 | (South Korea) | DF | Yoon Won-Il | 0 | 0 | 0 | 0 | 0 | 0 | 0 |
| 4 | (Australia) | DF | Adrian Madaschi | 9 | 0 | 1 | 0 | 10 (0) | 10 | 0 |
| 5 | (South Korea) | DF | Park Byeong-Ju | 9 (4) | 0 | 0 | 0 | 9 (4) | 13 | 0 |
| 6 | (South Korea) | DF | Choi Won-Kwon | 8 | 0 | 1 | 0 | 9 (0) | 9 | 0 |
| 7 | (South Korea) | MF | Kwon Soon-Hyung | 15 (2) | 0 | 1 | 0 | 16 (2) | 18 | 0 |
| 8 | (South Korea) | MF | Oh Seung-Bum | 4 (12) | 0 | 1 (1) | 0 | 5 (13) | 18 | 0 |
| 9 | (Brazil) | FW | Robert | 11 (2) | 3 | 0 | 0 | 11 (2) | 13 | 3 |
| 10 | (South Korea) | FW | Shim Young-Sung | 0 (1) | 0 | 1 | 1 | 1 (1) | 2 | 1 |
| 11 | (Brazil) | FW | Jair | 17 (1) | 10 | 1 (1) | 1 | 18 (2) | 20 | 11 |
| 13 | (South Korea) | MF | Jung Kyung-ho | 3 | 0 | 1 | 0 | 4 (0) | 4 | 0 |
| 14 | (South Korea) | FW | Song Ho-Young | 0 (2) | 0 | 0 (1) | 0 | 0 (3) | 3 | 0 |
| 15 | (South Korea) | DF | Hong Jung-Ho | 9 | 0 | 0 | 0 | 9 (0) | 9 | 0 |
| 16 | (South Korea) | DF | Ma Chul-Jun | 0 | 0 | 1 | 0 | 1 (0) | 1 | 0 |
| 17 | (South Korea) | DF | Heo Jae-Won | 18 | 0 | 1 | 0 | 19 (0) | 19 | 0 |
| 18 | (South Korea) | FW | Kang Su-Il | 1 (7) | 0 | 1 | 0 | 2 (7) | 9 | 0 |
| 19 | (South Korea) | GK | Jeon Tae-Hyun | 2 | 0 | 0 | 0 | 2 (0) | 2 | 0 |
| 20 | (South Korea) | FW | Seo Dong-Hyun | 6 (12) | 4 | 2 | 1 | 8 (12) | 20 | 5 |
| 21 | (South Korea) | GK | Han Dong-Jin | 16 | 0 | 1 | 0 | 17 (0) | 17 | 0 |
| 22 | (South Korea) | MF | Yang Joon-A | 0 | 0 | 0 (1) | 0 | 0 (1) | 1 | 0 |
| 23 | (South Korea) | MF | Ahn Jong-Hun | 0 | 0 | 0 | 0 | 0 | 0 | 0 |
| 24 | (South Korea) | FW | Nam Joon-Jae | 0 | 0 | 0 | 0 | 0 | 0 | 0 |
| 25 | (South Korea) | FW | Kim Jun-Yub | 2 (2) | 0 | 0 | 0 | 2 (2) | 4 | 0 |
| 26 | (South Korea) | DF | Oh Ban-Suk | 7 | 1 | 2 | 0 | 9 (0) | 9 | 1 |
| 27 | (South Korea) | MF | Jeong Seok-Min | 0 (2) | 0 | 0 (1) | 0 | 0 (3) | 3 | 0 |
| 28 | (South Korea) | MF | Noh Sung-Chan | 0 | 0 | 0 | 0 | 0 | 0 | 0 |
| 29 | (South Korea) | MF | Jin Dae-Sung | 0 | 0 | 0 | 0 | 0 | 0 | 0 |
| 30 | (South Korea) | FW | Bae Il-Hwan | 16 | 3 | 0 | 0 | 16 (0) | 16 | 3 |
| 31 | (South Korea) | GK | Kim Sun-Jin | 0 | 0 | 0 | 0 | 0 | 0 | 0 |
| 32 | (South Korea) | MF | Jang Jeong-Hyun | 0 | 0 | 0 | 0 | 0 | 0 | 0 |
| 33 | (South Korea) | DF | Han Yong-Su | 3 (3) | 0 | 1 | 0 | 4 (3) | 7 | 0 |
| 34 | (South Korea) | DF | Lee Sung-Hyun | 0 | 0 | 0 | 0 | 0 | 0 | 0 |
| 35 | (South Korea) | DF | Kwon Yong-Nam | 0 (3) | 0 | 0 | 0 | 0 (3) | 3 | 0 |
| 36 | (South Korea) | FW | Shin Young-Rok | 0 | 0 | 0 | 0 | 0 | 0 | 0 |
| 37 | (South Korea) | MF | Song Jin-Hyung | 16 | 3 | 2 | 0 | 18 (0) | 18 | 3 |
| 38 | (South Korea) | FW | Lee Sang-Hyup | 0 | 0 | 0 | 0 | 0 | 0 | 0 |
| 39 | (South Korea) | FW | Santos | 18 | 9 | 2 | 1 | 20 (0) | 20 | 10 |

=== Goals and assists ===
| Rank | Nation | Number | Name | K-League | | KFA Cup | | Sum | | Total |
| Rank | Nation | Number | Name | Goals | Assists | Goals | Assists | Goals | Assists | Total |
|---|---|---|---|---|---|---|---|---|---|---|
| 1 | (Brazil) | 39 | Santos | 9 | 8 | 1 | 1 | 10 | 9 | 19 |
| 2 | (Brazil) | 11 | Jair | 10 | 5 | 1 | 0 | 11 | 5 | 16 |
| 3 | (South Korea) | 20 | Seo Dong-Hyun | 4 | 1 | 1 | 2 | 5 | 3 | 8 |
| 4 | (South Korea) | 37 | Song Jin-Hyung | 3 | 4 | 0 | 0 | 3 | 4 | 7 |
| 5 | (Brazil) | 9 | Robert | 3 | 0 | 0 | 0 | 3 | 0 | 3 |
| = | (South Korea) | 30 | Bae Il-Hwan | 3 | 0 | 0 | 0 | 3 | 0 | 3 |
| 6 | (South Korea) | 17 | Heo Jae-Won | 0 | 2 | 0 | 0 | 0 | 2 | 2 |
| 7 | (South Korea) | 26 | Oh Ban-Suk | 1 | 0 | 0 | 0 | 1 | 0 | 1 |
| = | (South Korea) | 10 | Shim Young-Sung | 0 | 0 | 1 | 0 | 1 | 0 | 1 |
| = | (South Korea) | 8 | Oh Seung-Bum | 0 | 0 | 0 | 1 | 0 | 1 | 1 |
| / | / | / | Own Goals | 1 | - | 0 | - | 1 | - | 1 |
| / | / | / | TOTALS | 34 | 20 | 4 | 4 | 38 | 24 | |

=== Discipline ===
| Position | Nation | Number | Name | K-League | | KFA Cup | | Total | |
| Position | Nation | Number | Name | Yellow card | Red card | Yellow card | Red card | Yellow card | Red card |
| DF | (South Korea) | 2 | Park Jin-Ok | 2 | 0 | 1 | 0 | 3 | 0 |
| DF | (Australia) | 4 | Adrian Madaschi | 3 | 0 | 0 | 0 | 3 | 0 |
| DF | (South Korea) | 5 | Park Byeong-Ju | 2 | 1 | 0 | 0 | 2 | 1 |
| DF | (South Korea) | 6 | Choi Won-Kwon | 2 | 0 | 0 | 0 | 2 | 0 |
| MF | (South Korea) | 7 | Kwon Soon-Hyung | 2 | 0 | 0 | 0 | 2 | 0 |
| MF | (South Korea) | 13 | Jung Kyung-ho | 1 | 0 | 1 | 0 | 2 | 0 |
| DF | (South Korea) | 15 | Hong Jung-Ho | 3 | 0 | 0 | 0 | 3 | 0 |
| DF | (South Korea) | 17 | Heo Jae-Won | 2 | 0 | 0 | 0 | 2 | 0 |
| DF | (South Korea) | 26 | Oh Ban-Suk | 2 | 0 | 1 | 0 | 3 | 0 |
| DF | (South Korea) | 35 | Kwon Yong-Nam | 1 | 0 | 0 | 0 | 1 | 0 |
| MF | (South Korea) | 37 | Song Jin-Hyung | 2 | 0 | 0 | 0 | 2 | 0 |
| / | / | / | TOTALS | 22 | 1 | 3 | 0 | 25 | 1 |
