= 2011 Jeju United FC season =

Jeju United FC
2011 season
- Chairman: Koo Ja-Young
- Manager: Park Kyung-Hoon
- K-League: 9th
- Korean FA Cup: Round of 16
- League Cup: Quarterfinal
- Champions League: Group Round
- Top goalscorer: League: Santos (14); All: Santos (15)
- Highest home attendance: 12,775 vs Seoul (August 20)
- Lowest home attendance: 1,191 vs Gwangju (June 25)
- Average home league attendance: 4,257
Home colours	Away colours

The 2011 Jeju United FC season is the clubs twenty-ninth season in the K-League. Jeju United competed in the K-League, League Cup, Korean FA Cup, and the AFC Champions League.

== Current squad ==
Note: Flags indicate national team as defined under FIFA eligibility rules; some limited exceptions apply. Players may hold more than one non-FIFA nationality.

No.	Pos.	Nation	Player
1	GK	KOR	Kim Ho-Jun
2	DF	KOR	Park Jin-Ok
3	DF	KOR	Kang Min-hyuk
4	DF	KOR	Kim In-Ho
5	MF	KOR	Yang Joon-A
6	DF	KOR	Choi Won-Kwon
7	MF	KOR	Kim Young-Sin
8	MF	KOR	Oh Seung-Bum
9	FW	KOR	Kang Su-Il
10	FW	KOR	Shin Young-Rok
11	FW	BRA	Jair
13	DF	KOR	Ma Chul-Jun
14	MF	KOR	Kim Tae-Min
15	DF	KOR	Hong Jung-Ho
16	FW	KOR	Bae Ki-Jong
17	FW	KOR	Kim Jun-Yup
18	FW	KOR	Kim Eun-Jung (captain)
19	GK	KOR	Jeon Tae-Hyun

No.	Pos.	Nation	Player
20	DF	KOR	Oh Ban-Suk
21	GK	KOR	Han Dong-Jin
22	FW	KOR	Lee Hyun-Ho
23	FW	KOR	Han Jae-Man
24	MF	KOR	Jung Da-Seul
25	DF	KOR	Kang Joon-Woo
26	DF	KOR	Yoon Won-Il
27	FW	KOR	Nam Joon-Jae
28	FW	BRA	Felipinho
30	FW	KOR	Bae Il-Hwan
31	GK	KOR	Lee Jin-Hyung
32	MF	KOR	Lee Keun-Won
33	MF	KOR	An Jong-Hun
35	FW	KOR	Kwon Yong-Nam
36	DF	KOR	Kang Min-Seong
37	FW	KOR	Shim Young-Sung
39	FW	BRA	Santos
43	MF	KOR	Moon Min-Kwi

=== Out on loan ===
Note: Flags indicate national team as defined under FIFA eligibility rules; some limited exceptions apply. Players may hold more than one non-FIFA nationality.

No.	Pos.	Nation	Player
29	FW	KOR	Lee Sang-Hyup (to Daejeon Citizen (from 29 July 2011))

== Match results ==
=== K-League ===
Date Round	Home	Score	Away	Location

6 March 1	Jeju United	2–1	Busan I’Park	Seogwipo, Jeju
15:00 UTC+9	Santos 27'; Bae Ki-Jong 61'; Hong Jung-Ho (red card)	Report	Park Hee-Do 12'	Stadium: Jeju World Cup Stadium; Attendance: 4,172; Referee: Lee Jong-Guk

12 March 2	Incheon United	0–0	Jeju United	Nam-gu, Incheon
15:00 UTC+9		Report		Stadium: Incheon Munhak Stadium; Attendance: 27,831; Referee: Yoo Seon-Ho

20 March 3	Jeju United	1–0	Gangwon	Seogwipo, Jeju
15:00 UTC+9	Baek Jong-Hwan 67' (o.g.)	Report		Stadium: Jeju World Cup Stadium; Attendance: 3,152; Referee: Ko Keum-Bok

2 April 4	Jeju United	3–3	Sangju Sangmu Phoenix	Seogwipo, Jeju
15:00 UTC+9	Kim In-Ho 24'; Santos 32'; Kang Su-Il 90+1'	Report	Kim Jung-Woo 2', 39' (pen.); Ko Cha-Won 84'	Stadium: Jeju World Cup Stadium; Attendance: 2,054; Referee: Ryu Hee-Seon

10 April 5	Daejeon Citizen	0–0	Jeju United	Yuseong-gu, Daejeon
15:00 UTC+9	Han Jae-Woong (yellow card) 52' (yellow-red card) 64'	Report		Stadium: Daejeon World Cup Stadium; Attendance: 16,788; Referee: Ahn Yong-Hee

16 April 6	Jeju United	1–3	Pohang Steelers	Seogwipo, Jeju
15:00 UTC+9	Kim In-Ho 47'; Kang Min-hyuk (red card) 73'	Report	Hwang Jin-Sung 12', 73' (pen.); No Byung-Jun 30'	Stadium: Jeju World Cup Stadium; Attendance: 2,078; Referee: Lee Min-Hu

24 April 7	Jeju United	2–1	Seongnam Ilhwa Chunma	Seogwipo, Jeju
15:00 UTC+9	Park Hyun-Beom 10'; Kim Sung-hwan 74' (o.g.)	Report	Namgung Do 90+6' (pen.)	Stadium: Jeju World Cup Stadium; Attendance: 2,813; Referee: Lee Sam-Ho

30 April 8	FC Seoul	2–1	Jeju United	Mapo-gu, Seoul
17:00 UTC+9	Park Yong-Ho 57'; Ko Myong-Jin 81'	Report	Park Hyun-Beom 36'	Stadium: Seoul World Cup Stadium; Attendance: 9,797; Referee: Choi Myung-Yong

8 May 9	Jeju United	3–0	Daegu	Seogwipo, Jeju
15:00 UTC+9	Santos 27'; Kim Eun-Jung 77'; Bae Ki-Jong 88'	Report	An Sang-Hyun (yellow card) 33' (yellow-red card) 73'	Stadium: Jeju World Cup Stadium; Attendance: 3,547; Referee: Kim Sung-Ho

15 May 10	Ulsan Hyundai	0–1	Jeju United	Seosan, Chungnam
17:00 UTC+9		Report	Park Hyun-Beom 59'	Stadium: Seosan City Stadium; Attendance: 21,755; Referee: Ko Keum-Bok

21 May 11	Jeju United	0–1	Chunnam Dragons	Seogwipo, Jeju
15:00 UTC+9		Report	Ji Dong-Won 62'	Stadium: Jeju World Cup Stadium; Attendance: 3,260; Referee: Lee Sam-Ho

29 May 12	Gyeongnam	1–1	Jeju United	Changwon, Gyeongnam
19:00 UTC+9	DeVere 59'	Report	Jair 29'	Stadium: Changwon Football Center; Attendance: 8,498; Referee: Hong Jin-Ho

11 June 13	Jeju United	3–2	Suwon Samsung Bluewings	Seogwipo, Jeju
15:00 UTC+9	Jair 44'; Santos 62'; Kwon Yong-Nam 90+1'	Report	Geynrikh 6'; Park Jong-Jin 65'	Stadium: Jeju World Cup Stadium; Attendance: 2,712; Referee: Yoo Seon-Ho

18 June 14	Jeonbuk Hyundai Motors	3–2	Jeju United	Jeonju, Jeonbuk
19:00 UTC+9	Eninho 64'; Kim In-Ho 82' (o.g.); Luiz Henrique 88'	Report	Santos 10', 65'	Stadium: Jeonju World Cup Stadium; Attendance: 15,939; Referee: Choi Kwang-Bo

25 June 15	Jeju United	2–1	Gwangju	Seogwipo, Jeju
15:00 UTC+9	Santos 54'; Bae Ki-Jong 90+2'	Report	Yoo Dong-Min 90'	Stadium: Jeju World Cup Stadium; Attendance: 1,191; Referee: Ryu Hee-Sun

2 July 16	Gangwon FC	2–4	Jeju United	Chuncheon, Gangwon
19:00 UTC+9	Lee Eul-Yong 36'; Kim Young-Hoo 41'	Report	Kim Eun-Jung 4', 80'; Lee Hyun-Ho 27'; Santos 86'	Stadium: Chuncheon Stadium; Attendance: 3,207; Referee: Lee Sam-Ho

9 July 17	Jeju United	2–3	Gyeongnam	Seogwipo, Jeju
19:00 UTC+9	Park Hyun-Beom 41' (pen.); Santos 57'; Kang Joon-Woo (yellow card) 33' (yellow-red card) 77'	Report	Yoon Il-Rok 76'; Yoon Bit-Garam 78'; Kim In-Han 90+1'	Stadium: Jeju World Cup Stadium; Attendance: 6,326; Referee: Kim Sung-Ho

16 July 18	Seongnam Ilhwa Chunma	2–2	Jeju United	Seongnam, Gyeonggi
19:00 UTC+9	Héverton 17'; Éverton 21'	Report	Park Hyun-Beom 75' (pen.), 82'	Stadium: Tancheon Sports Complex; Attendance: 3,591; Referee: Kim Jong-Hyuk

23 July 19	Sangju Sangmu Phoenix	1–1	Jeju United	Sangju, Gyeongbuk
19:00 UTC+9	Kim Jung-Woo 59'	Report	Kim Eun-Jung 88'	Stadium: Sangju Stadium; Attendance: 8,451; Referee: Lee Dong-Jun

6 August 20	Daegu	0–2	Jeju United	Buk-gu, Daegu
19:00 UTC+9		Report	Kim Young-Sin 30'; Lee Hyun-Ho 63'	Stadium: Daegu Civil Stadium; Attendance: 4,128; Referee: Lee Jong-Guk

13 August 21	Jeju United	3–3	Daejeon Citizen	Seogwipo, Jeju
19:00 UTC+9	Santos 31', 59'; Kang Su-Il 47'	Report	Park Sung-Ho 26', 45+2'; Lee Ho 83'	Stadium: Jeju World Cup Stadium; Attendance: 10,597; Referee: Lim Won-Taek

20 August 22	Jeju United	0–3	FC Seoul	Seogwipo, Jeju
19:00 UTC+9		Report	Damjanović 41', 87'; Ha Dae-Sung 74'	Stadium: Jeju World Cup Stadium; Attendance: 12,775; Referee: Lee Sang-Yong

27 August 23	Gwangju	2–2	Jeju United	Seo-gu, Gwangju
19:00 UTC+9	Lee Seung-Ki 11'; Heo Jae-Won 40'	Report	Kwon Yong-Nam 70'; Kim Eun-Jung 78'	Stadium: Gwangju World Cup Stadium; Attendance: 3,285; Referee: Ko Keum-Bok

10 September 24	Jeju United	1–2	Ulsan Hyundai	Seogwipo, Jeju
15:00 UTC+9	Santos 44'	Report	Kwak Tae-Hwi 30', 71'	Stadium: Jeju World Cup Stadium; Attendance: 2,523; Referee: Choi Myung-Yong

18 September 25	Chunnam Dragons	1–1	Jeju United	Gwangyang, Jeonnam
19:00 UTC+9	Kim Myung-Joong 46'	Report	Kim Eun-Jung 65'	Stadium: Gwangyang Stadium; Attendance: 8,249; Referee: Kim Dong-Jin

24 September 26	Jeju United	0–0	Jeonbuk Hyundai Motors	Seogwipo, Jeju
15:00 UTC+9		Report		Stadium: Jeju World Cup Stadium; Attendance: 7,059; Referee: Lee Min-Hu

2 October 27	Pohang Steelers	2–1	Jeju United	Pohang, Gyeongbuk
15:00 UTC+9	Asamoah 3'; Mota 22'	Report	Santos 64'	Stadium: Steelyard Stadium; Attendance: 12,139; Referee: Yoo Sun-Ho

16 October 28	Busan I'Park	3–1	Jeju United	Yeonje-gu, Busan
15:00 UTC+9	Park Jong-Woo 33'; Lim Sang-Hyub 42', 59'	Report	Yang Joon-A 84' (yellow card) 44' (yellow-red card) 88'	Stadium: Busan Asiad Stadium; Attendance: 4,835; Referee: Ko Keum-Bok

22 October 29	Jeju United	2–1	Incheon United	Seogwipo, Jeju
15:00 UTC+9	Kang Su-Il 37'; Santos 67' (pen.)	Report	Kapadze 33'	Stadium: Jeju World Cup Stadium; Attendance: 4,879; Referee: Lee Sam-Ho

30 October 30	Suwon Samsung Bluewings	2–0	Jeju United	Suwon, Gyeonggi
15:00 UTC+9	Neretljak 30'; Ristić 89'	Report		Stadium: Suwon World Cup Stadium; Attendance: 20,197; Referee: Choi Kwang-Bo

==== League table ====
Pos	Team	Pld	W	D	L	GF	GA	GD	Pts	Qualification
7	Jeonnam Dragons	30	11	10	9	33	29	+4	43	
8	Gyeongnam FC	30	12	6	12	41	40	+1	42	
9	Jeju United	30	10	10	10	44	45	−1	40	
10	Seongnam Ilhwa Chunma	30	9	8	13	43	47	−4	35	Qualification for the Champions League group stage (Note: Qualified as champions of the FA Cup.)
11	Gwangju FC	30	9	8	13	32	43	−11	35	

Source: K League
Rules for classification: 1) Points; 2) Goal difference; 3) Goals scored
Notes:

Pos	Team	Qualification
1	Jeonbuk Hyundai Motors (C)	Qualification for the Champions League group stage
2	Ulsan Hyundai	Qualification for the Champions League group stage
3	Pohang Steelers	Qualification for the Champions League playoff round
4	Suwon Samsung Bluewings	
5	FC Seoul	
6	Busan IPark	

Source: RSSSF
(C) Champions

==== Results summary ====
Overall								Home						Away					
Pld	W	D	L	GF	GA	GD	Pts	W	D	L	GF	GA	GD	W	D	L	GF	GA	GD
30	10	10	10	44	45	−1	40	7	3	5	25	24	+1	3	7	5	19	21	−2

==== Results by round ====
Round	1	2	3	4	5	6	7	8	9	10	11	12	13	14	15	16	17	18	19	20	21	22	23	24	25	26	27	28	29	30
Ground	H	A	H	H	A	H	H	A	H	A	H	A	H	A	H	A	H	A	A	A	H	H	A	H	A	H	A	A	H	A
Result	W	D	W	D	D	L	W	L	W	W	L	D	W	L	W	W	L	D	D	W	D	L	D	L	D	D	L	L	W	L
Position	4	5	4	6	6	8	6	7	5	3	5	4	3	3	3	3	3	4	5	3	5	6	7	7	7	8	8	9	9	9

Updated to match(es) played on 30 October 2011. Source: League Fixtures and Results
A = Away; H = Home; W = Win; D = Draw; L = Loss

=== Korean FA Cup ===
18 May Round of 32	Goyang Kookmin Bank	2–4	Jeju United	Goyang, Gyeonggi
19:00 UTC+9	Kim Young-Nam 61', 77'		Santos 54'; Park Hyun-Beom 62'; Kim Eun-Jung 66'; Kang Su-Il 86'	Stadium: Goyang Stadium; Attendance: 800

15 June Round of 16	Chunnam Dragons	1–0 (a.e.t.)	Jeju United	Gwangyang, Jeonnam
19:00 UTC+9	Wesley 117'		Park Jin-Ok (yellow card) 59' (yellow-red card) 111'	Stadium: Gwangyang Football Stadium; Attendance: 2,297; Referee: Kim Sang-Woo

=== League Cup ===
29 June Quarterfinal	Jeju United	0–0 (a.e.t.) (2–4 p)	Suwon Samsung Bluewings	Seogwipo, Jeju
19:00 UTC+9		Report		Stadium: Jeju World Cup Stadium; Attendance: 2,822; Referee: Kim Sung-Ho
	Penalties
	Han Jae-Man (penalty missed); Ma Chul-Jun (penalty scored); Felipinho (penalty scored); Kang Su-Il (penalty missed)		(penalty scored) Woo Seung-Je; (penalty scored) Choi Sung-Hwan; (penalty missed) Shin Yeon-Soo; (penalty scored) No Hyung-Goo; (penalty scored) Yang Sang-Min

=== AFC Champions League ===
==== Group stage ====
Pos	Team	Pld	W	D	L	GF	GA	GD	Pts	Qualification
1	(Japan) Gamba Osaka	6	3	1	2	13	7	+6	10 (Note: Tiebreakers: Gamba Osaka and Tianjin Teda are ranked by their head-to-head records: Gamba Osaka (3 pts, +1 GD), Tianjin Teda (3 pts, –1 GD).)	Advance to knockout stage
2	(China) Tianjin Teda	6	3	1	2	8	6	+2	10	Advance to knockout stage
3	(South Korea) Jeju United	6	2	1	3	6	10	−4	7	
4	(Australia) Melbourne Victory	6	1	3	2	7	11	−4	6	

Notes:

1 March Group Round	Jeju United (South Korea)	0–1	(China) Tianjin Teda	Seogwipo, South Korea
15:00 UTC+9		Report	Yu Dabao 54'	Stadium: Jeju World Cup Stadium; Attendance: 5,245; Referee: Abdullah Al Hilali (Oman)

15 March Group Round	Melbourne Victory (Australia)	1–2	(South Korea) Jeju United	Melbourne, Australia
19:30 UTC+11	Allsopp 37'	Report	Park Hyun-Beom 41'; Lee Hyun-Ho 84'	Stadium: Docklands Stadium; Attendance: 4,825; Referee: Subkhiddin Mohd Salleh (Malaysia)

5 April Group Round	Jeju United (South Korea)	2–1	(Japan) Gamba Osaka	Seogwipo, South Korea
19:30 UTC+11	Shin Young-Rok 53'; Bae Ki-Jong 64'	Report	Nakazawa 23'	Stadium: Jeju World Cup Stadium; Attendance: 2,167; Referee: Mohsen Torky (Iran)

20 April Group Round	Gamba Osaka (Japan)	3–1	(South Korea) Jeju United	Osaka, Japan
19:00 UTC+9	Adriano 26', 48'; Takei 88'	Report	Shin Young-Rok 67'	Stadium: Osaka Expo '70 Stadium; Attendance: 11,398; Referee: Ravshan Irmatov (Uzbekistan)

4 May Group Round	Tianjin Teda (China)	3–0	(South Korea) Jeju United	Tianjin, China PR
19:30 UTC+8	Olguín 8'; Wu Weian 21'; Cao Yang 72' (pen.)	Report		Stadium: TEDA Football Stadium; Attendance: 26,683; Referee: Mohamed Al Zarooni (UAE)

11 May Group Round	Jeju United (South Korea)	1–1	(Australia) Melbourne Victory	Seogwipo, South Korea
19:30 UTC+9	Kim Eun-Jung 25'	Report	Ferreira 61'	Stadium: Jeju World Cup Stadium; Attendance: 1,519; Referee: Valentin Kovalenko (Uzbekistan)

== Squad statistics ==
=== Appearances and goals ===
Statistics accurate as of match played 30 October 2011
Numbers in parentheses denote appearances as substitute.

No.	Nat.	Pos.	Name	League		FA Cup		League Cup		Champions League		Total	
No.	Nat.	Pos.	Name	Apps	Goals	Apps	Goals	Apps	Goals	Apps	Goals	Apps	Goals
1	KOR	GK	Kim Ho-Jun	24	0	2	0	0	0	6	0	32 (0)	0
2	KOR	DF	Park Jin-Ok	19 (2)	0	2	0	0	0	0	0	21 (2)	0
3	KOR	DF	Kang Min-hyuk	18 (2)	0	0	1	0	0	3 (1)	0	22 (3)	0
4	KOR	DF	Kim In-Ho	10 (1)	2	1 (1)	0	0	0	4 (1)	0	15 (3)	2
5	KOR	MF	Yang Joon-A	6	1	0	0	0	0	0	0	6 (0)	1
6	KOR	DF	Choi Won-Kwon	14 (1)	0	0 (1)	0	0	0	2 (1)	0	16 (3)	0
7	KOR	MF	Kim Young-Sin	15 (7)	1	0	0	1	0	6	0	22 (7)	1
8	KOR	MF	Oh Seung-Bum	29	0	2	0	0	0	0	0	31 (0)	0
9	KOR	FW	Kang Su-Il	5 (18)	3	1 (1)	1	1	0	0 (3)	0	7 (22)	4
10	KOR	FW	Shin Young-Rok	3 (5)	0	0	0	0	0	3 (1)	2	6 (6)	2
11	BRA	FW	Jair	9 (2)	2	1 (1)	0	0	0	1 (1)	0	11 (4)	2
13	KOR	DF	Ma Chul-Jun	10 (5)	0	1	0	1	0	4 (1)	0	16 (6)	0
14	KOR	MF	Kim Tae-Min	1 (3)	0	0	0	1	0	3	0	5 (3)	0
15	KOR	DF	Hong Jeong-Ho	16	0	2	0	0	0	6	0	24 (0)	0
16	KOR	FW	Bae Ki-Jong	23 (3)	3	1	0	0	0	6	1	30 (3)	4
17	KOR	FW	Kim Jun-Yup	2	0	0	0	0	0	0	0	2 (0)	0
18	KOR	FW	Kim Eun-Jung	27 (3)	6	1 (1)	1	0	0	3 (2)	1	31 (6)	8
19	KOR	GK	Jeon Tae-Hyun	6	0	0	0	0 (1)	0	0	0	6 (1)	0
20	KOR	DF	Oh Ban-Suk	0	0	0	0	0	0	0	0	0	0
21	KOR	GK	Han Dong-Jin	0	0	0	0	1	0	0	0	1 (0)	0
22	KOR	FW	Lee Hyun-Ho	19 (8)	2	1 (1)	0	1	0	6	1	27 (9)	3
23	KOR	FW	Han Jae-Man	0	0	0	0	0 (1)	0	0	0	0 (1)	0
24	KOR	MF	Jung Da-Seul	0	0	0	0	0	0	0	0	0	0
25	KOR	DF	Kang Joon-Woo	19 (4)	0	2	0	0	0	1 (2)	0	22 (6)	0
26	KOR	DF	Yoon Won-Il	1 (4)	0	0	0	1	0	0	0	2 (4)	0
27	KOR	FW	Nam Joon-Jae	1 (2)	0	0	0	0	0	0	0	1 (2)	0
28	BRA	FW	Felipinho	1	0	1	0	0 (1)	0	0 (2)	0	2 (3)	0
30	KOR	FW	Bae Il-Hwan	0 (1)	0	0	0	0 (1)	0	0	0	0 (2)	0
31	KOR	GK	Lee Jin-Hyung	0	0	0	0	0	0	0	0	0	0
32	KOR	MF	Lee Keun-Won	0	0	0	0	0	0	0	0	0	0
33	KOR	MF	An Jong-Hun	0 (1)	0	0	0	0 (1)	0	0	0	0 (2)	0
35	KOR	FW	Kwon Yong-Nam	3 (7)	2	0 (1)	0	1	0	0	0	4 (8)	2
36	KOR	DF	Kang Min-Seong	0	0	0	0	0	0	0	0	0	0
37	KOR	FW	Shim Young-Sung	0 (7)	0	0	0	1	0	0	0	1 (7)	0
39	BRA	FW	Santos	28 (1)	14	1	1	0	0	6	0	35 (1)	15
43	KOR	MF	Moon Min-Kwi	1	0	0	0	1	0	0	0	2 (0)	0
5	KOR	MF	Park Hyun-Beom (out)	18	6	2	1	0	0	6	1	26 (0)	8
27	KOR	DF	Cho Won-Kwang (out)	0	0	0	0	0	0	0	0	0	0
29	KOR	FW	Lee Sang-Hyup (loan out)	2 (1)	0	1	0	0	0	0 (3)	0	3 (4)	0
34	KOR	MF	Kang In-Jun (out)	0	0	0	0	0	0	0	0	0	0
38	KOR	DF	Lee Yoon-Ho (out)	0	0	0	0	0	0	0	0	0	0
41	KOR	DF	Yoo Wook-Jin (out)	0	0	0	0	0	0	0	0	0	0
42	KOR	DF	Hyun Kwang-Woo (out)	0	0	0	0	0	0	0	0	0	0

=== Top scorers ===
Rank	Nation	Number	Name	K-League	KFA Cup	League Cup	Champions League	Total
1	(Brazil)	39	Santos	14	1	0	0	15
2	(South Korea)	5	Park Hyun-Beom	6	1	0	1	8
=	(South Korea)	18	Kim Eun-Jung	6	1	0	1	8
3	(South Korea)	16	Bae Ki-Jong	3	0	0	1	4
=	(South Korea)	9	Kang Su-Il	3	1	0	0	4
4	(South Korea)	22	Lee Hyun-Ho	2	0	0	1	3
5	(South Korea)	4	Kim In-Ho	2	0	0	0	2
=	(Brazil)	11	Jair	2	0	0	0	2
=	(South Korea)	35	Kwon Yong-Nam	2	0	0	0	2
=	(South Korea)	10	Shin Young-Rok	0	0	0	2	2
6	(South Korea)	5	Yang Joon-A	1	0	0	0	1
=	(South Korea)	7	Kim Young-Sin	1	0	0	0	1
/	/	/	Own Goals	2	0	0	0	2
/	/	/	TOTALS	44	4	0	6	54

=== Top assistors ===
Rank	Nation	Number	Name	K-League	KFA Cup	League Cup	Champions League	Total
1	(South Korea)	18	Kim Eun-Jung	7	0	0	1	8
2	(South Korea)	16	Bae Ki-Jong	6	0	0	0	6
3	(Brazil)	39	Santos	4	1	0	0	5
=	(South Korea)	5	Park Hyun-Beom	2	0	0	3	5
4	(South Korea)	8	Oh Seung-Bum	4	0	0	0	4
5	(Brazil)	11	Jair	2	1	0	0	3
6	(South Korea)	22	Lee Hyun-Ho	2	0	0	0	2
=	(South Korea)	9	Kang Su-Il	1	0	0	1	2
=	(South Korea)	2	Park Jin-Ok	1	1	0	0	2
7	(South Korea)	15	Hong Jeong-Ho	1	0	0	0	1
=	(South Korea)	25	Kang Joon-Woo	1	0	0	0	1
=	(South Korea)	35	Kwon Yong-Nam	1	0	0	0	1
=	(South Korea)	13	Ma Chul-Jun	0	1	0	0	1
/	/	/	TOTALS	32	4	0	5	41

=== Discipline ===
Position	Nation	Number	Name	K-League		KFA Cup		League Cup		Champions League		Total	
Position	Nation	Number	Name	Booked	Sent off (straight red)	Booked	Sent off (straight red)	Booked	Sent off (straight red)	Booked	Sent off (straight red)	Booked	Sent off (straight red)
GK	(South Korea)	1	Kim Ho-Jun	2	0	0	0	0	0	1	0	3	0
DF	(South Korea)	2	Park Jin-Ok	2	0	2	1	0	0	0	0	4	1
DF	(South Korea)	3	Kang Min-hyuk	3	1	0	0	0	0	0	0	3	1
DF	(South Korea)	4	Kim In-Ho	4	0	0	0	0	0	1	0	5	0
MF	(South Korea)	5	Park Hyun-Beom	0	0	1	0	0	0	0	0	1	0
MF	(South Korea)	5	Yang Joon-A	3	1	0	0	0	0	0	0	3	1
DF	(South Korea)	6	Choi Won-Kwon	1	0	0	0	0	0	0	0	1	0
MF	(South Korea)	7	Kim Young-Sin	2	0	0	0	1	0	0	0	3	0
DF	(South Korea)	8	Oh Seung-Bum	5	0	2	0	0	0	0	0	7	0
FW	(South Korea)	9	Kang Su-Il	1	0	0	0	0	0	0	0	1	0
FW	(South Korea)	10	Shin Young-Rok	2	0	0	0	0	0	1	0	3	0
FW	(Brazil)	11	Jair	3	0	0	0	0	0	0	0	3	0
DF	(South Korea)	13	Ma Chul-Jun	4	0	0	0	0	0	0	0	4	0
MF	(South Korea)	14	Kim Tae-Min	1	0	0	0	1	0	0	0	2	0
DF	(South Korea)	15	Hong Jeong-Ho	1	1	1	0	0	0	0	0	2	1
FW	(South Korea)	16	Bae Ki-Jong	2	0	1	0	0	0	0	0	3	0
FW	(South Korea)	18	Kim Eun-Jung	1	0	0	0	0	0	0	0	1	0
GK	(South Korea)	19	Jeon Tae-Hyun	1	0	0	0	0	0	0	0	1	0
FW	(South Korea)	22	Lee Hyun-Ho	1	0	0	0	0	0	1	0	2	0
DF	(South Korea)	25	Kang Joon-Woo	8	1	2	0	0	0	2	1	12	2
DF	(South Korea)	26	Yoon Won-Il	1	0	0	0	1	0	0	0	2	0
FW	(South Korea)	29	Lee Sang-Hyup	1	0	0	0	0	0	0	0	1	0
FW	(Brazil)	39	Santos	2	0	0	0	0	0	1	0	3	0
/	/	/	TOTALS	51	4	9	1	3	0	7	1	70	6

== Transfer ==
=== In ===
- 20 July 2011 – (South Korea) Yang Joon-A – Suwon Samsung Bluewings
- July 2011 – (South Korea) Nam Joon-Jae – Chunnam Dragons

=== Out ===
- 20 July 2011 – (South Korea) Park Hyun-Beom – Suwon Samsung Bluewings
- 28 July 2011 – (South Korea) Kang In-Jun – Daejeon Citizen
- 28 July 2011 – (South Korea) Lee Sang-Hyup – Daejeon Citizen (loan)
- July 2011 – (South Korea) Cho Won-Kwang – Cheonan City FC
- July 2011 – (South Korea) Yoo Wook-Jin – Free Agent
- July 2011 – (South Korea) Hyun Kwang-Woo – Free Agent
- July 2011 – (South Korea) Lee Yoon-Ho – Free Agent
