= 2011 Seongnam Ilhwa Chunma season =

Seongnam Ilhwa Chunma
2011 season
- Chairman: Park Kyu-Nam
- Manager: Shin Tae-Yong
- K-League: 10th
- Korean FA Cup: Winners
- League Cup: Group round
- Top goalscorer: League: Cho Dong-Geon (7); All: Cho Dong-Geon (11)
- Highest home attendance: 14,756 vs Suwon (October 15)
- Lowest home attendance: 518 vs Mokpo City (May 18)
- Average home league attendance: 5,131
Home colours	Away colours

The 2011 season was Seongnam Ilhwa Chunma's twenty-third season in the K-League in South Korea. Seongnam Ilhwa Chunma was competing in K-League, League Cup and Korean FA Cup.

== Current squad ==
Note: Flags indicate national team as defined under FIFA eligibility rules; some limited exceptions apply. Players may hold more than one non-FIFA nationality.

No.	Pos.	Nation	Player
1	GK	KOR	Ha Kang-Jin
3	DF	KOR	Yun Young-Sun
4	DF	AUS	Saša Ognenovski (captain)
6	DF	KOR	Park Jin-Po
8	MF	KOR	Jo Jae-Cheol
9	FW	KOR	Cho Dong-Geon
10	FW	MNE	Dženan Radončić
11	MF	KOR	Lee Chang-Hoon
12	FW	KOR	Sim Jae-Myung
13	DF	KOR	Jeong Ho-Jeong
15	MF	KOR	Kim Pyung-Rae
16	DF	KOR	Kim Sung-hwan
17	FW	KOR	Song Ho-Young
18	FW	KOR	Namgung Do
19	MF	KOR	Namgung Woong
20	FW	BRA	Héverton (on loan from Portuguesa)
21	GK	KOR	Jung San
22	MF	KOR	Jeon Sung-Chan
23	MF	KOR	Choi Yeon-Keun
24	DF	KOR	Kim Tae-Yoon

No.	Pos.	Nation	Player
25	MF	KOR	Lee Chi-Joon
26	DF	KOR	Jang Suk-Won
27	DF	KOR	Yong Hyun-Jin
29	MF	KOR	Park Ji-Seung
30	FW	KOR	Kim Deok-Il
31	GK	KOR	Lee Jin-Kyu
32	MF	KOR	Park Sang-Hee
33	DF	KOR	Hong Cheol
34	DF	KOR	Song Sung-Hyun
35	FW	KOR	Kim Jung-Kwang
36	MF	KOR	Lim Se-Hyun
37	MF	KOR	Park Joon-Hyun
38	FW	KOR	Han Geu-Loo
39	DF	KOR	Joo Yeong-Jae
40	MF	KOR	Kim Tae-Wang
41	GK	KOR	Kang Sung-Kwan
42	MF	KOR	Yoon Man-Ki
44	MF	KOR	Hong Jin-Sub
86	FW	BRA	Éverton Santos
88	MF	KOR	Kim Jung-Woo

== Match results ==
=== K-League ===
Date Round	Home	Score	Away	Location

5 March 1	Pohang Steelers	1–1	Seongnam Ilhwa Chunma	Pohang, Gyeongbuk
15:00 UTC+9	Mota 3'	Report	Kim Jin-Yong 59'	Stadium: Steelyard Stadium; Attendance: 17,353; Referee: Yoo Seon-Ho

12 March 2	Seongnam Ilhwa Chunma	0–1	Jeonbuk Hyundai Motors	Seongnam, Gyeonggi
15:00 UTC+9		Report	Sim Woo-Yeon 35'	Stadium: Tancheon Sports Complex; Attendance: 9,571; Referee: Lee Min-Hoo

20 March 3	Seongnam Ilhwa Chunma	2–3	Sangju Sangmu Phoenix	Seongnam, Gyeonggi
15:00 UTC+9	Song Ho-Young 4'; Ognenovski 88' (pen.)	Report	Jang Nam-Seok 65', 66'; Kim Jung-Woo 68'	Stadium: Tancheon Sports Complex; Attendance: 2,893; Referee: Kim Dong-Jin

3 April 4	Seongnam Ilhwa Chunma	2–0	Busan I'Park	Seongnam, Gyeonggi
17:00 UTC+9	Cho Dong-Geon 53'; Hong Cheol 55'	Report		Stadium: Tancheon Sports Complex; Attendance: 6,438; Referee: Lee Sang-Yong

10 April 5	Chunnam Dragons	0–0	Seongnam Ilhwa Chunma	Gwangyang, Jeonnam
15:00 UTC+9		Report		Stadium: Gwangyang Stadium; Attendance: 8,099; Referee: Lee Min-Hoo

17 April 6	Incheon United	2–1	Seongnam Ilhwa Chunma	Seo-gu, Incheon
15:00 UTC+9	Kim Jae-Woong 1'; Park Jun-Tae 90+1'	Report	Hong Jin-Sub 78'	Stadium: Incheon Munhak Stadium; Attendance: 8,278; Referee: Choi Myung-Yong

24 April 7	Jeju United	2–1	Seongnam Ilhwa Chunma	Seogwipo, Jeju
15:00 UTC+9	Park Hyun-Beom 10'; Kim Sung-hwan 74' (o.g.)	Report	Namgung Do 90+6' (pen.)	Stadium: Jeju World Cup Stadium; Attendance: 2,813; Referee: Lee Sam-Ho

30 April 8	Gyeongnam	2–2	Seongnam Ilhwa Chunma	Changwon, Gyeongnam
19:00 UTC+9	Lucio 40'; Kim Young-Woo 82'	Report	Lee Yong-Gi 12' (o.g.); Cho Dong-Geon 34' (pen.)	Stadium: Changwon Football Center; Attendance: 2,317; Referee: Yoo Seon-Ho

8 May 9	Gangwon	1–1	Seongnam Ilhwa Chunma	Chuncheon, Gangwon
15:00 UTC+9	Kim Young-Hoo 19'	Report	Hong Cheol 22'	Stadium: Chuncheon Stadium; Attendance: 3,177; Referee: Moon Jin-Hee

15 May 10	Seongnam Ilhwa Chunma	1–1	Suwon Samsung Bluewings	Seongnam, Gyeonggi
17:00 UTC+9	Ognenovski 57' (pen.)	Report	Geynrikh 87'	Stadium: Tancheon Sports Complex; Attendance: 12,131; Referee: Yoo Seon-Ho

22 May 11	Ulsan Hyundai	3–2	Seongnam Ilhwa Chunma	Nam-gu, Ulsan
17:00 UTC+9	Kim Shin-Wook 13'; Seol Ki-Hyeon 32' (pen.); Kwak Tae-Hwi 80'	Report	Cho Dong-Geon 26', 45+1'	Stadium: Munsu Cup Stadium; Attendance: 8,576; Referee: Lee Sang-Yong

29 May 12	Seongnam Ilhwa Chunma	2–0	Seoul	Seongnam, Gyeonggi
17:00 UTC+9	Cho Dong-Geon 75'; Kim Jin-Yong 87'	Report		Stadium: Tancheon Sports Complex; Attendance: 10,314; Referee: Lee Sam-Ho

11 June 13	Gwangju	2–0	Seongnam Ilhwa Chunma	Seo-gu, Gwangju
19:00 UTC+9	Lee Seung-Ki 77'; João Paulo 78'	Report		Stadium: Gwangju World Cup Stadium; Attendance: 4,132; Referee: Moon Jin-Hee

18 June 14	Seongnam Ilhwa Chunma	2–1	Daejeon Citizen	Seongnam, Gyeonggi
19:00 UTC+9	Jeon Sung-Chan 26'; Cho Dong-Geon 72'	Report	Hwang Jin-San 65'	Stadium: Tancheon Sports Complex; Attendance: 8,712; Referee: Lee Sang-Yong

25 June 15	Daegu	2–1	Seongnam Ilhwa Chunma	Buk-gu, Daegu
19:00 UTC+9	Juninho 21' (pen.); Quirino 90+2'	Report	Namgung Do 74'	Stadium: Daegu Civil Stadium; Attendance: 1,127; Referee: Hong Jin-Ho

2 July 16	Busan I'Park	1–0	Seongnam Ilhwa Chunma	Yeonje-gu, Busan
19:00 UTC+9	Han Sang-Woon 17'	Report		Stadium: Busan Asiad Stadium; Attendance: 6,019; Referee: Kim Dong-Jin

10 July 17	Seongnam Ilhwa Chunma	2–2	Incheon United	Seongnam, Gyeonggi
17:00 UTC+9	Bae Hyo-Sung 56' (o.g.); Song Ho-Young 86'	Report	Ognenovski 46' (o.g.); Kapadze 82'	Stadium: Tancheon Sports Complex; Attendance: 3,147; Referee: Moon Jin-Hee

16 July 18	Seongnam Ilhwa Chunma	2–2	Jeju United	Seongnam, Gyeonggi
19:00 UTC+9	Héverton 17'; Éverton 21'	Report	Park Hyun-Beom 75' (pen.), 82'	Stadium: Tancheon Sports Complex; Attendance: 3,591; Referee: Kim Jong-hyeok

24 July 19	Jeonbuk Hyundai Motors	2–0	Seongnam Ilhwa Chunma	Jeonju, Jeonbuk
19:00 UTC+9	Jeong Ho-Jeong 15' (o.g.); Kim Dong-Chan 63'	Report		Stadium: Jeonju World Cup Stadium; Attendance: 16,298; Referee: Lee Sam-Ho

6 August 20	Sangju Sangmu Phoenix	1–3	Seongnam Ilhwa Chunma	Sangju, Gyeongbuk
19:30 UTC+9	Kim Jung-Woo 74'	Report	Namgung Do 28'; Radončić 63'; Éverton 86'	Stadium: Sangju Stadium; Attendance: 8,867; Referee: Choi Myung-Yong

14 August 21	Seongnam Ilhwa Chunma	3–2	Ulsan Hyundai	Seongnam, Gyeonggi
19:00 UTC+9	Jeon Sung-Chan 17'; Éverton 20'; Héverton 77'	Report	Go Seul-Ki 58', 86'	Stadium: Tancheon Sports Complex; Attendance: 5,026; Referee: Kim Sung-Ho

20 August 22	Seongnam Ilhwa Chunma	1–1	Gyeongnam	Seongnam, Gyeonggi
19:00 UTC+9	Éverton 21'	Report		Stadium: Tancheon Sports Complex; Attendance: 5,195; Referee: Ko Keum-Bok

27 August 23	Seongnam Ilhwa Chunma	1–0	Daegu	Seongnam, Gyeonggi
19:00 UTC+9	Cho Dong-Geon 19' (pen.)	Report		Stadium: Tancheon Sports Complex; Attendance: 3,899; Referee: Lee Dong-Jun

10 September 24	Suwon Samsung Bluewings	3–2	Seongnam Ilhwa Chunma	Suwon, Gyeonggi
18:00 UTC+9	Ristić 13'; Yeom Ki-Hun 24'; Oh Jang-Eun 84'	Report	Ognenovski 48', 90+2'; Hong Cheol (red card) 86'	Stadium: Suwon World Cup Stadium; Attendance: 15,787; Referee: Lee Sam-Ho

17 September 25	Seongnam Ilhwa Chunma	1–3	Gwangju	Seongnam, Gyeonggi
19:00 UTC+9	Ognenovski (red card) 2'; Radončić 69'	Report	Lee Seung-Ki 3' (pen.); Kim Dong-Sub 43'; João Paulo 90+1'	Stadium: Tancheon Sports Complex; Attendance: 5,589; Referee: Kim Sang-Woo

25 September 26	Seongnam Ilhwa Chunma	3–2	Chunnam Dragons	Seongnam, Gyeonggi
15:00 UTC+9	Héverton 20' (pen.), 88'; Éverton 43'	Report	Ahn Jae-Joon 45+1'; Hwang Do-Yeon 77'	Stadium: Tancheon Sports Complex; Attendance: 4,225; Referee: Lee Jong-Guk

1 October 27	Daejeon Citizen	0–2	Seongnam Ilhwa Chunma	Yuseong-gu, Daejeon
15:00 UTC+9	Lee Sang-Hyup (red card) 85'	Report	Hong Chul 10'; Héverton 13'	Stadium: Daejeon World Cup Stadium; Attendance: 10,351; Referee: Kim Jong-hyeok

8 October 28	Seongnam Ilhwa Chunma	3–1	Gangwon	Seongnam, Gyeonggi
15:00 UTC+9	Radončić 1'; Kim Sung-hwan 9'; Héverton 69'	Report	Kim Young-Hoo 52'	Stadium: Tancheon Sports Complex; Attendance: 3,010; Referee: Lee Sang-Yong

23 October 29	FC Seoul	3–1	Seongnam Ilhwa Chunma	Mapo-gu, Seoul
15:00 UTC+9	Kim Tae-Hwan 35'; Damjanović 76'; Molina 90+2'	Report	Jeon Seong-Chan 24'	Stadium: Seoul World Cup Stadium; Attendance: 42,909; Referee: Mun Jin-Hee

30 October 30	Seongnam Ilhwa Chunma	1–3	Pohang Steelers	Seongnam, Gyeonggi
15:00 UTC+9	Ognenovski 57' (pen.)	Report	Ko Mu-Yeol 55', 71' (pen.); Cho Chan-Ho 74'	Stadium: Tancheon Sports Complex; Attendance: 3,211; Referee: Choi Myung-Yong

==== League table ====
Pos	Team	Pld	W	D	L	GF	GA	GD	Pts	Qualification
8	Gyeongnam FC	30	12	6	12	41	40	+1	42	
9	Jeju United	30	10	10	10	44	45	−1	40	
10	Seongnam Ilhwa Chunma	30	9	8	13	43	47	−4	35	Qualification for the Champions League group stage (Note: Qualified as champions of the FA Cup.)
11	Gwangju FC	30	9	8	13	32	43	−11	35	
12	Daegu FC	30	8	9	13	35	46	−11	33	

Source: K League
Rules for classification: 1) Points; 2) Goal difference; 3) Goals scored
Notes:

Pos	Team	Qualification
1	Jeonbuk Hyundai Motors (C)	Qualification for the Champions League group stage
2	Ulsan Hyundai	Qualification for the Champions League group stage
3	Pohang Steelers	Qualification for the Champions League playoff round
4	Suwon Samsung Bluewings	
5	FC Seoul	
6	Busan IPark	

Source: RSSSF
(C) Champions

==== Results summary ====
Overall								Home						Away					
Pld	W	D	L	GF	GA	GD	Pts	W	D	L	GF	GA	GD	W	D	L	GF	GA	GD
30	9	8	13	43	47	−4	35	7	4	4	26	22	+4	2	4	9	17	25	−8

==== Results by round ====
Round	1	2	3	4	5	6	7	8	9	10	11	12	13	14	15	16	17	18	19	20	21	22	23	24	25	26	27	28	29	30
Ground	A	H	H	H	A	A	A	H	A	H	A	H	A	H	A	A	H	H	A	A	H	A	H	A	H	H	A	H	A	H
Result	D	L	L	W	D	L	L	D	D	D	L	W	L	W	L	L	D	D	L	W	W	D	W	L	L	W	W	W	L	L
Position	8	12	13	10	11	13	15	15	15	15	15	15	15	14	14	15	14	14	15	14	14	13	11	12	13	11	10	10	10	10

Updated to match(es) played on 30 October 2011. Source: League Fixtures and Results
A = Away; H = Home; W = Win; D = Draw; L = Loss

=== Korean FA Cup ===
18 May Round of 32	Seongnam Ilhwa Chunma	3–0	Mokpo City	Seongnam, Gyeonggi
19:00 UTC+9	Ognenovski 42'; Namgung Do 51'; Jo Jae-Cheol 78'			Stadium: Tancheon Sports Complex; Attendance: 518; Referee: Kim Sang-Woo

15 June Round of 16	Incheon United	0–2	Seongnam Ilhwa Chunma	Nam-gu, Incheon
19:00 UTC+9			Cho Dong-Geon 47'; Éverton Santos 67'	Stadium: Incheon Munhak Stadium; Attendance: 1,027; Referee: Kim Jong-hyeok

27 July Quarterfinal	Seongnam Ilhwa Chunma	2–1	Busan I'Park	Seongnam, Gyeonggi
19:00 UTC+9	Héverton 5'; Radončić 90'		Han Sang-Woon 13' (pen.)	Stadium: Tancheon Sports Complex; Attendance: 928; Referee: Kim Sung-Ho

24 August Semifinal	Seongnam Ilhwa Chunma	3–0	Pohang Steelers	Seongnam, Gyeonggi
19:30 UTC+9	Ognenovski 39'; Cho Dong-Geon 45'; Radončić 65'			Stadium: Tancheon Sports Complex; Attendance: 5,752; Referee: Kim Sang-Woo

15 October Final	Seongnam Ilhwa Chunma	1–0	Suwon Samsung Bluewings	Seongnam, Gyeonggi
14:00 UTC+9	Cho Dong-Geon 76'		Geynrikh (red card) 90'	Stadium: Tancheon Sports Complex; Attendance: 14,756; Referee: Kim Jong-Kyuk

=== League Cup ===
16 March Group round	Pohang Steelers	2–0	Seongnam Ilhwa Chunma	Pohang, Gyeongbuk
19:30 UTC+9	Jeong Seok-Min 57'; Kim Tae-Su 66'	Report		Stadium: Steelyard Stadium; Attendance: 7,211; Referee: Kim Jong-hyeok

6 April Group round	Seongnam Ilhwa Chunma	0–0	Gyeongnam FC	Seongnam, Gyeonggi
20:00 UTC+9		Report		Stadium: Tancheon Sports Complex; Attendance: 1,411; Referee: Woo Sang-Il

20 April Group round	Seongnam Ilhwa Chunma	1–0	Daejeon Citizen	Seongnam, Gyeonggi
20:00 UTC+9	Cho Dong-Geon 83'	Report		Stadium: Tancheon Sports Complex; Attendance: 1,534; Referee: Ko Keum-Bok

5 May Group round	Daegu FC	0–2	Seongnam Ilhwa Chunma	Buk-gu, Daegu
15:00 UTC+9		Report	Hong Cheol 80'; Kim Deok-Il 84'	Stadium: Daegu World Cup Stadium; Attendance: 9,744; Referee: Ko Keum-Bok

11 May Group round	Seongnam Ilhwa Chunma	1–1	Incheon United	Seongnam, Gyeonggi
20:00 UTC+9	Hong Jin-Sub 23'	Report	Kim Jae-Woong 16'	Stadium: Tancheon Sports Complex; Attendance: 1,024; Referee: Hong Jin-Ho

== Squad statistics ==
=== Appearances and goals ===
Statistics accurate as of match played 30 October 2011

Numbers in parentheses denote appearances as substitute.

No.	Nat.	Pos.	Name	League		FA Cup		League Cup		Total	
No.	Nat.	Pos.	Name	Apps	Goals	Apps	Goals	Apps	Goals	Apps	Goals
1	KOR	GK	Ha Kang-Jin	27	0	5	0	3	0	35 (0)	0
3	KOR	DF	Yun Young-Sun	14 (2)	0	1	0	1 (1)	0	16 (3)	0
4	AUS	DF	Saša Ognenovski	23 (1)	5	5	2	4	0	32 (1)	7
6	KOR	DF	Park Jin-Po	28	0	5	0	3 (1)	0	36 (1)	0
8	KOR	MF	Jo Jae-Cheol	26 (2)	0	5	1	4 (1)	0	35 (3)	1
9	KOR	FW	Cho Dong-Geon	24 (3)	7	3 (2)	3	5	1	32 (5)	11
10	MNE	FW	Dženan Radončić	4 (6)	3	1 (2)	2	0	0	5 (8)	5
11	KOR	MF	Lee Chang-Hoon	4 (5)	0	0	0	0	0	4 (5)	0
12	KOR	FW	Sim Jae-Myung	2 (3)	0	0 (1)	0	2 (3)	0	4 (7)	0
13	KOR	DF	Jeong Ho-Jeong	7	0	0	0	3	0	10 (0)	0
15	KOR	MF	Kim Pyung-Rae	0	0	0	0	1	0	1 (0)	0
16	KOR	DF	Kim Sung-hwan	29	1	4	0	4 (1)	0	37 (1)	1
17	KOR	FW	Song Ho-Young	5 (10)	2	1 (2)	0	1	0	7 (12)	2
18	KOR	FW	Namgung Do	6 (12)	3	1 (1)	1	1 (1)	0	8 (14)	4
19	KOR	MF	Namgung Woong	2 (3)	0	0 (1)	0	0	0	2 (4)	0
20	BRA	FW	Héverton	12	6	2 (1)	1	0	0	14 (1)	7
21	KOR	GK	Jung San	1	0	0	0	0	0	1 (0)	0
22	KOR	MF	Jeon Sung-Chan	21 (1)	3	5	0	1 (1)	0	27 (2)	3
23	KOR	MF	Choi Yeon-Keun	0	0	0	0	0	0	0	0
24	KOR	DF	Kim Tae-Yoon	25	0	5	0	3	0	33 (0)	0
25	KOR	MF	Lee Chi-Joon	0	0	0	0	0	0	0	0
26	KOR	DF	Jang Suk-Won	0	0	0	0	1	0	1 (0)	0
27	KOR	DF	Yong Hyun-Jin	9 (3)	0	1	0	4	0	15 (2)	0
29	KOR	MF	Park Ji-Seung	0	0	0	0	0	0	0	0
30	KOR	FW	Kim Deok-Il	1 (2)	0	0 (1)	0	1 (2)	1	2 (5)	1
31	KOR	GK	Lee Jin-Kyu	0	0	0	0	0	0	0	0
32	KOR	MF	Park Sang-Hee	0 (2)	0	0	0	0 (1)	0	0 (3)	0
33	KOR	DF	Hong Cheol	19 (1)	3	4	0	4	1	27 (1)	4
34	KOR	DF	Song Sung-Hyun	0	0	0	0	0	0	0	0
35	KOR	FW	Kim Jung-Kwang	0	0	0	0	0	0	0	0
36	KOR	MF	Lim Se-Hyun	3 (1)	0	0	0	1	0	4 (1)	0
37	KOR	MF	Park Joon-Hyun	0	0	0	0	0	0	0	0
38	KOR	FW	Han Geu-Loo	1 (3)	0	0	0	0	0	1 (3)	0
39	KOR	DF	Joo Yeong-Jae	0	0	0	0	0	0	0	0
40	KOR	MF	Kim Tae-Wang	0 (1)	0	0	0	0	0	0 (1)	0
41	KOR	GK	Kang Sung-Kwan	2	0	0	0	2	0	4 (0)	0
42	KOR	MF	Yoon Man-Ki	0	0	0	0	0	0	0	0
44	KOR	MF	Hong Jin-Sub	7 (7)	1	2	0	3	1	12 (7)	2
86	BRA	FW	Éverton Santos	18 (7)	5	4 (1)	1	2 (1)	0	24 (9)	6
88	KOR	MF	Kim Jung-Woo	0 (2)	0	0	0	0	0	0 (2)	0
11	BRA	MF	Jean Carlos (out)	3	0	0	0	0	0	3 (0)	0
20	KOR	FW	Kim Jin-Yong (out)	7 (4)	2	1	0	1 (1)	0	9 (5)	2
28	KOR	DF	Lee Hyun-Woo (out)	0	0	0	0	0	0	0	0

=== Top scorers ===
Rank	Nation	Number	Name	K-League	KFA Cup	League Cup	Total
1	(South Korea)	9	Cho Dong-Geon	7	3	1	11
2	(Brazil)	20	Héverton	6	1	0	7
=	(Australia)	4	Saša Ognenovski	5	2	0	7
3	(Brazil)	86	Éverton Santos	5	1	0	6
4	(Montenegro)	10	Dženan Radončić	3	2	0	5
5	(South Korea)	18	Namgung Do	3	1	0	4
=	(South Korea)	33	Hong Cheol	3	0	1	4
6	(South Korea)	22	Jeon Sung-Chan	3	0	0	3
7	(South Korea)	17	Song Ho-Young	2	0	0	2
=	(South Korea)	20	Kim Jin-Yong	2	0	0	2
=	(South Korea)	44	Hong Jin-Sub	1	0	1	2
7	(South Korea)	16	Kim Sung-hwan	1	0	0	1
=	(South Korea)	8	Jo Jae-Cheol	0	1	0	1
=	(South Korea)	30	Kim Deok-Il	0	0	1	1
/	/	/	Own Goals	2	0	0	2
/	/	/	TOTALS	43	11	4	58

=== Top assistors ===
Rank	Nation	Number	Name	K-League	KFA Cup	League Cup	Total
1	(South Korea)	8	Jo Jae-Cheol	5	0	0	5
2	(South Korea)	6	Park Jin-Po	3	1	0	4
=	(South Korea)	9	Cho Dong-Geon	2	2	0	4
=	(South Korea)	33	Hong Cheol	2	2	0	4
3	(South Korea)	24	Kim Tae-Yoon	3	0	0	3
=	(Brazil)	20	Héverton	2	1	0	3
=	(Brazil)	86	Éverton Santos	1	2	0	3
4	(Montenegro)	10	Dženan Radončić	2	0	0	2
=	(South Korea)	11	Lee Chang-Hoon	2	0	0	2
=	(South Korea)	16	Kim Sung-hwan	2	0	0	2
5	(South Korea)	18	Namgung Do	1	0	0	1
=	(South Korea)	22	Jeon Sung-Chan	1	0	0	1
=	(South Korea)	17	Song Ho-Young	0	1	0	1
=	(South Korea)	12	Sim Jae-Myung	0	0	1	1
=	(South Korea)	27	Yong Hyun-Jin	0	0	1	1
=	(South Korea)	44	Hong Jin-Sub	0	0	1	1
/	/	/	TOTALS	26	9	3	38

=== Discipline ===
Position	Nation	Number	Name	K-League		KFA Cup		League Cup		Total	
Position	Nation	Number	Name	Booked	Sent off (straight red)	Booked	Sent off (straight red)	Booked	Sent off (straight red)	Booked	Sent off (straight red)
GK	(South Korea)	1	Ha Kang-Jin	2	0	1	0	0	0	3	0
DF	(South Korea)	3	Yun Young-Sun	2	0	0	0	0	0	2	0
DF	(Australia)	4	Saša Ognenovski	9	1	2	0	1	0	12	1
DF	(South Korea)	6	Park Jin-Po	6	0	1	0	0	0	7	0
MF	(South Korea)	8	Jo Jae-Cheol	0	0	0	0	1	0	1	0
FW	(Montenegro)	10	Dženan Radončić	2	0	1	0	0	0	3	0
MF	(South Korea)	11	Lee Chang-Hoon	1	0	0	0	0	0	1	0
DF	(South Korea)	13	Jeong Ho-Jeong	1	0	0	0	0	0	1	0
MF	(South Korea)	16	Kim Sung-hwan	5	0	2	0	0	0	7	0
FW	(South Korea)	17	Song Ho-Young	1	0	1	0	0	0	2	0
FW	(South Korea)	18	Namgung Do	1	0	0	0	0	0	1	0
FW	(South Korea)	19	Namgung Woong	1	0	0	0	0	0	1	0
FW	(South Korea)	20	Kim Jin-Yong	1	0	0	0	1	0	2	0
FW	(Brazil)	20	Héverton	1	0	1	0	0	0	2	0
MF	(South Korea)	22	Jeon Sung-Chan	1	0	2	0	1	0	4	0
DF	(South Korea)	24	Kim Tae-Yoon	3	0	0	0	0	0	3	0
DF	(South Korea)	27	Yong Hyun-Jin	3	0	0	0	1	0	4	0
FW	(South Korea)	30	Kim Deok-Il	0	0	0	0	1	0	1	0
DF	(South Korea)	33	Hong Cheol	3	1	0	0	0	0	3	1
FW	(South Korea)	38	Han Geu-Loo	1	0	0	0	0	0	1	0
MF	(South Korea)	44	Hong Jin-Sub	2	0	1	0	1	0	4	0
FW	(Brazil)	86	Éverton Santos	3	0	0	0	0	0	3	0
/	/	/	TOTALS	49	2	12	0	7	0	68	2

== Transfer ==
=== In ===
- 14 July 2011 – (South Korea) Lee Chang-Hoon – Gangwon FC
- 14 July 2011 – (Brazil) Héverton – Portuguesa (loan)
- 21 September 2011 – (South Korea) Kim Jung-Woo – Sangju Sangmu Phoenix (return from army)

=== Out ===
- 7 July 2011 – (Brazil) Jean Carlos – Free Agent
- 7 July 2011 – (South Korea) Kim Jin-Yong – Gangwon FC
- July 2011 – (South Korea) Lee Hyun-Woo – Free Agent
