= 2011 Korean League Cup =

2011 Rush & Cash Cup

Tournament details
- Country: South Korea
- Dates: 16 March – 13 July 2011
- Teams: 16

Final positions
- Champions: Ulsan Hyundai (5th title)
- Runners-up: Busan IPark

Tournament statistics
- Matches played: 37
- Goals scored: 89 (2.41 per match)
- Attendance: 168,677 (4,559 per match)
- Top goal scorer: Kim Shin-wook (11 goals)

The 2011 Korean League Cup, also known as the Rush & Cash Cup 2011, was the 24th and the last competition of the Korean League Cup. It began on 16 March 2011, and ended on 13 July 2011.

== Group stage ==
All K League clubs excluding participating clubs of the 2011 AFC Champions League entered the group stage.

=== Group A ===
Pos	Team	Pld	W	D	L	GF	GA	GD	Pts	PHS	GNM	SIC	ICU	DGU	DJC
1	Pohang Steelers	5	4	0	1	11	3	+8	12	—	—	2–0	4–1	0–1	—
2	Gyeongnam FC	5	3	1	1	7	2	+5	10	1–2	—	—	1–0	—	3–0
3	Seongnam Ilhwa Chunma	5	2	2	1	4	3	+1	8	—	0–0	—	1–1	—	1–0
4	Incheon United	5	1	2	2	5	6	−1	5	—	—	—	—	0–0	3–0
5	Daegu FC	5	1	2	2	2	5	−3	5	—	0–2	0–2	—	—	—
6	Daejeon Citizen	5	0	1	4	1	11	−10	1	0–3	—	—	—	1–1	—

Source: RSSSF

=== Group B ===
Pos	Team	Pld	W	D	L	GF	GA	GD	Pts	BIP	USH	JND	GWN	SSP	GWJ
1	Busan IPark	5	4	0	1	7	3	+4	12	—	—	1–0	—	2–1	1–0
2	Ulsan Hyundai	5	4	0	1	8	5	+3	12	2–1	—	—	2–1	2–1	—
3	Jeonnam Dragons	5	3	1	1	4	1	+3	10	—	1–0	—	—	1–0	—
4	Gangwon FC	5	1	1	3	7	6	+1	4	0–2	—	0–0	—	—	5–0
5	Sangju Sangmu Phoenix	5	1	0	4	6	9	−3	3	—	—	—	2–1	—	2–3
6	Gwangju FC	5	1	0	4	4	12	−8	3	—	1–2	0–2	—	—	—

Source: RSSSF

== Knockout stage ==
=== Teams ===
Team	Placement
FC Seoul	Champions League qualified team
Jeonbuk Hyundai Motors	Champions League qualified team
Jeju United	Champions League qualified team
Suwon Samsung Bluewings	Champions League qualified team
Pohang Steelers	Group A winners
Busan IPark	Group B winners
Gyeongnam FC	Group A runners-up
Ulsan Hyundai	Group B runners-up

=== Bracket ===
Quarter-finals
B2	Ulsan Hyundai	4
CL	Jeonbuk Hyundai Motors	1
A2	Gyeongnam FC	1
CL	FC Seoul	0
A1	Pohang Steelers	1
B1	Busan IPark	2
CL	Jeju United	0 (2)
CL	Suwon Samsung Bluewings (p)	0 (4)

Semi-finals
Ulsan Hyundai	4
Gyeongnam FC	2
Busan IPark	2
Suwon Samsung Bluewings	1

Final
Ulsan Hyundai	3
Busan IPark	2

=== Quarter-finals ===
29 June 2011
19:30 KST

Pohang Steelers	1–2	Busan IPark
Jeong Seok-min 68'	Report	Yoon Dong-min 10'; Park Hee-do 19'

Steelyard Stadium, Pohang
Attendance: 6,288
Referee: Woo Sang-il

29 June 2011
19:00 KST

Jeju United	0–0 (a.e.t.)	Suwon Samsung Bluewings
	Report
Penalties
Han Jae-man (penalty missed); Ma Chul-jun (penalty scored); Felipinho (penalty scored); Kang Su-il (penalty missed)	2–4	(penalty scored) Woo Seung-je; (penalty scored) Choi Sung-hwan; (penalty missed) Shin Yeon-soo; (penalty scored) No Hyung-goo; (penalty scored) Yang Sang-min

Jeju World Cup Stadium, Seogwipo
Attendance: 2,822
Referee: Kim Sung-ho

29 June 2011
20:00 KST

Gyeongnam FC	1–0	FC Seoul
Yoon Bit-garam 26'	Report

Changwon Football Center, Changwon
Attendance: 2,469
Referee: Ahn Yong-hee

29 June 2011
19:00 KST

Ulsan Hyundai	4–1	Jeonbuk Hyundai Motors
Kim Shin-wook 26', 30'; Choi Jae-soo 41'; Jung Dae-sun 53'	Report	Park Jung-hoon 20'

Munsu Cup Stadium, Ulsan
Attendance: 2,153
Referee: Ryu Hee-sun

=== Semi-finals ===
6 July 2011
20:00 KST

Busan IPark	2–1	Suwon Samsung Bluewings
Lim Sang-hyub 43'; Kim Han-yoon 90'	Report	Yang Joon-a 7'

Busan Asiad Stadium, Busan
Attendance: 1,878
Referee: Yoo Seon-ho

6 July 2011
19:00 KST

Ulsan Hyundai	4–2	Gyeongnam FC
Kim Shin-wook 47', 66', 78', 87'	Report	Lee Hyo-kyun 15'; Lee Dong-geun 80'

Ulsan Munsu Football Stadium, Ulsan
Attendance: 2,589
Referee: Ko Keum-bok

=== Final ===
13 July 2011
19:00 KST

Ulsan Hyundai	3–2	Busan IPark
Ko Chang-hyun 38'; Seol Ki-hyeon 45+1'; Kang Jin-wook 58'	Report	Yang Dong-hyun 71', 77'

Ulsan Munsu Football Stadium, Ulsan
Attendance: 21,853
Referee: Lee Min-hu

== Statistics ==
=== Top scorers ===
Rank	Player	Club	Goals
1	(South Korea) Kim Shin-wook	Ulsan Hyundai	11
2	(South Korea) Kim Jung-woo	Sangju Sangmu Phoenix	3
3	(South Korea) Yang Dong-hyun	Busan IPark	2
3	(Australia) Robert Cornthwaite	Jeonnam Dragons	2
3	(South Korea) Hwang Il-su	Daegu FC	2
3	(South Korea) Kim Young-hoo	Gangwon FC	2
3	(South Korea) Seo Dong-hyeon	Gangwon FC	2
3	(Brazil) Lúcio Curió	Gyeongnam FC	2
3	(South Korea) Yoon Bit-garam	Gyeongnam FC	2
3	(Brazil) Adriano Chuva	Pohang Steelers	2
3	(South Korea) Cho Chan-ho	Pohang Steelers	2
3	(South Korea) Jeong Seok-min	Pohang Steelers	2
3	(South Korea) Kim Gi-dong	Pohang Steelers	2
3	(South Korea) Kim Dong-hyun	Sangju Sangmu Phoenix	2
3	(South Korea) Lee Jin-ho	Ulsan Hyundai	2
3	(South Korea) Seol Ki-hyeon	Ulsan Hyundai	2

=== Top assist providers ===
Rank	Player	Club	Assists
1	(South Korea) Choi Jae-soo	Ulsan Hyundai	4
2	(South Korea) Hwang Jin-sung	Pohang Steelers	3
2	(South Korea) Ko Chang-hyun	Ulsan Hyundai	3
2	(South Korea) Seol Ki-hyeon	Ulsan Hyundai	3
2	(South Korea) Lee Ho	Ulsan Hyundai	3
6	(South Korea) Lee Chang-hoon	Gangwon FC	2
6	(South Korea) Kim Dong-hyun	Sangju Sangmu Phoenix	2

== Awards ==
Award	Player	Team	Points
Top goalscorer	(South Korea) Kim Shin-wook	Ulsan Hyundai	11 goals
Top assist provider	(South Korea) Choi Jae-soo	Ulsan Hyundai	4 assists

== See also ==
- 2011 in South Korean football
- 2011 K League
- 2011 Korean FA Cup
- 2011 South Korean football match-fixing scandal
