= Jong-hun =

- Hangul: 종훈
- RR: Jonghun
- MR: Chonghun

Jong-hun, also spelled Jong-hoon, is a Korean given name.

People with this name include:

- Kim Jong-hoon (born 1952), South Korean politician
- Jeong H. Kim (born 1961), South Korean-born American engineer
- Gao Zhongxun (born Go Jong-hun, 1965) Chinese football player
- Park Jong-hoon (born 1965), South Korean gymnast
- Chang Jong-hoon (born 1968), South Korean baseball coach
- Kim Jong-hoon (footballer) (born 1980), South Korean football player
- Yoon Jong-hoon (born 1984), South Korean actor
- Ahn Jong-hun (born 1989), South Korean footballer
- Shin Jong-hun (born 1989), South Korean light flyweight amateur boxer
- Choi Jong-hoon (born 1990), South Korean musician and actor

== See also ==
- List of Korean given names
