= Park Byeong-ju (disambiguation) =

Park Byeong-ju or Pak Pyong-ju (박병주) may refer to:

- Park Byung-joo (born 1942), South Korean footballer
- Park Byeong-ju (born 1985), South Korean footballer
- Park Byeong-ju (skier) (born 1979), South Korean cross-country skier
