= Jin Dae-sung =

South Korean footballer (born 1989)

Jin Dae-Sung
Personal information
- Full name: Jin Dae-Sung
- Date of birth: 19 September 1989 (age 37)
- Place of birth: South Korea
- Height: 1.79 m (5 ft 10 1/2 in)
- Position: Midfielder

Team information
- Current team: Gangneung City FC

Youth career
- 2008–2011: Jeonju University

Senior career*
Years	Team	Apps	(Gls)
2012–	Jeju United	31	(5)
2013	→ Ulsan Hyundai Mipo (loan)	15	(8)
2016	→ Daejeon Citizen (loan)	24	(3)
2017–2018	→ Sangju Sangmu (army)	2	(0)
2019–	Gangneung City FC	0	(0)
- * Club domestic league appearances and goals as of 1 January 2018

Jin Dae-Sung (Korean: 진대성; born 19 September 1989) is a South Korean footballer who plays as a midfielder for Gangneung City FC.

== Career ==
He was selected by Jeju United in 2012 K League draft.
