= Song Jin-hyung =

South Korean footballer (born 1987)

Song Jin-hyung 송진형
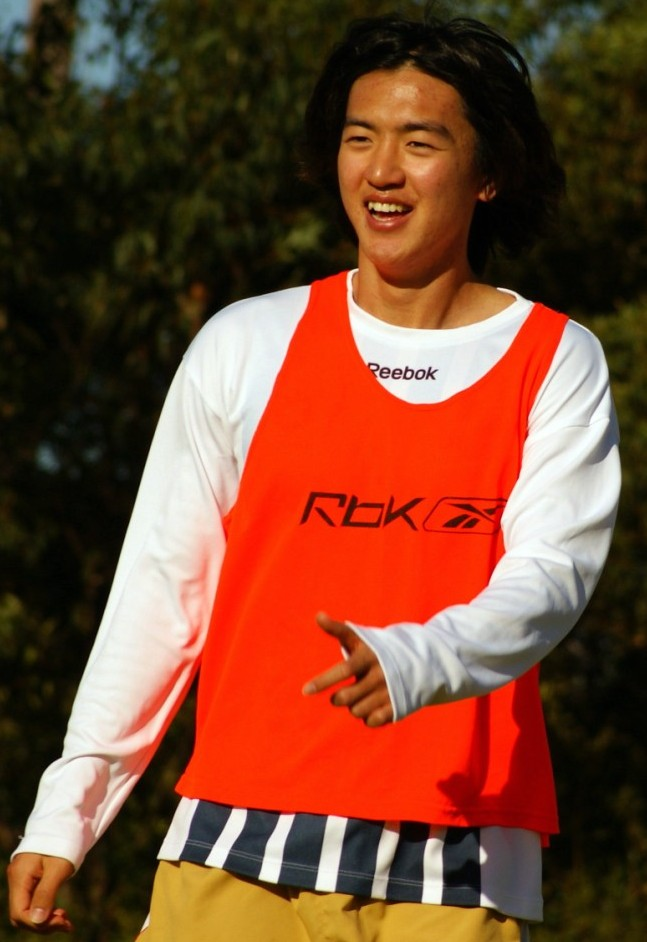

Personal information
- Full name: Song Jin-hyung
- Date of birth: 13 August 1987 (age 39)
- Place of birth: Seoul, South Korea
- Height: 1.76 m (5 ft 9 in)
- Positions: Attacking midfielder; central midfielder

Youth career
- Internacional

Senior career*
Years	Team	Apps	(Gls)
2003–2007	FC Seoul	15	(0)
2008–2010	Newcastle Jets	49	(5)
2010–2012	Tours FC	51	(3)
2012–2016	Jeju United	165	(29)
2016–2017	Al-Sharjah	6	(2)
2017–2020	FC Seoul	6	(1)

International career
2005–2007	South Korea U20	19	(6)
2012–2014	South Korea	3	(0)
- * Club domestic league appearances and goals as of 6 December 2020

- Song Jin-hyung
- Hangul: 송진형
- Hanja: 宋珍炯
- RR: Song Jinhyeong
- MR: Song Chinhyŏng

Song Jin-hyung (Korean: 송진형; born 13 August 1987) is a South Korean football player who plays as a midfielder. He gained the nickname 'Right-foot Specialist' for his sharp and precise right-footed free-kick shooting aiming at the goal. Additionally, he garnered great popularity among female fans for his handsome appearance. He has scored 46 goals in 314 professional games and is called a legend of Jeju United FC.

== Club career ==
Song started his professional career at Brazilian club Internacional, before moving back to his homeland South Korea to play for one of the powerhouses of Korean and Asian football FC Seoul.

After a stint with FC Seoul, Song went to Australia in the hope of securing an A-League contract. After trialling with Newcastle United Jets, he impressed coach Gary van Egmond enough to earn a contract with the club. Newcastle's management immediately secured his visa and arranged his contract, a two-year deal signed on 18 January 2008.

Song made his debut for the club in the away leg of their semi-final clash with rivals, Central Coast Mariners, which Newcastle lost 3–0. He played a starring role in their subsequent grand final victory over Central Coast, constantly proving a menacing threat for the Mariners' defence. Song's first senior career goal came on 19 December 2008 against Melbourne Victory. Song threaded through a sublime ball through to Jets' striker Joel Griffiths, who squared the ball back to Song to fire into the bottom corner of the net, securing three points for the Jets.

Song made it clear that his preference was to play in Europe, although he didn't ruled out the possibility of re-signing with the Jets. On 29 March 2010, it was announced that he would trial at PSV Eindhoven, the former club of fellow Koreans Park Ji-Sung and Lee Young-Pyo.

On 28 June 2010 the 22-year-old Korean attacking midfielder signed a two-year contract with Tours FC of the French Ligue 2.

In January 2012, he returned to South Korea from the French side for K-League outfit Jeju United. On 31 January 2012, Song signed a three-year contract with Jeju on a free transfer.

In September 2016, he transferred to Al-Sharjah SCC.

== International career ==
Song played for South Korea U-20 at the 2006 AFC Youth Championship and at the subsequent 2007 FIFA U-20 World Cup. He scored two goals against Australia to knock them out of the 2006 AFC Youth Championship.

== Career statistics ==
=== Club ===
Club performance			League		Cup		League Cup		Continental		Total	
Season	Club	League	Apps	Goals	Apps	Goals	Apps	Goals	Apps	Goals	Apps	Goals
South Korea			League		KFA Cup		League Cup		Asia		Total	
2003	Anyang LG Cheetahs	K League 1	0	0	0	0	–		–		0	0
2004	FC Seoul	K League 1	0	0	0	0	1	0	–		1	0
2005	FC Seoul	K League 1	0	0	0	0	0	0	–		0	0
2006	FC Seoul	K League 1	7	0	0	0	1	0	–		8	0
2007	FC Seoul	K League 1	8	0	0	0	3	0	–		11	0
Australia			League		Cup		League Cup		Oceania/Asia		Total	
2007–08	Newcastle Jets	A-League	3	0	0	0	0	0	–		3	0
2008–09	Newcastle Jets	A-League	18	1	3	1	–		0	0	21	2
2009–10	Newcastle Jets	A-League	28	4	0	0	–		1	0	29	4
France			League		Coupe de France		Coupe de la Ligue		Europe		Total	
2010–11	Tours FC	Ligue 2	34	3	1	0			–		35	3
2011–12	Tours FC	Ligue 2	17	0	1	0	2	0	–		20	0
South Korea			League		KFA Cup		League Cup		Asia		Total	
2012	Jeju United	K League 1	39	10	3	0	–	–	–		42	10
Total	South Korea		54	10	3	0	5	0	–		62	10
Total	Australia		49	5	3	1	0	0	1	0	53	6
Total	France		51	3	2	0	2	0	–		55	3
Career total			154	18	8	1	7	0	1	0	170	19

== Honours ==
FC Seoul

- Korean League Cup: 2006

Newcastle Jets

- A-League Championship: 2007–2008
