= Kim In-ho (footballer) =

South Korean footballer (born 1983)

Kim In-Ho
Personal information
- Full name: Kim In-Ho
- Date of birth: 9 June 1983 (age 43)
- Place of birth: South Korea
- Height: 1.84 m (6 ft 0 in)
- Position: Defender

Senior career*
Years	Team	Apps	(Gls)
2002–2003	Chunnam Dragons	0	(0)
2004–2005	Police (army)		
2006–2009	Jeonbuk Hyundai Motors	41	(0)
2009–2011	Jeju United	27	(2)
- * Club domestic league appearances and goals as of 13 February 2011

Kim In-Ho (Korean: 김인호; born 9 June 1983) is a South Korean former football player. He was involved in a match fixing scandal that ended his K-League career. He formerly played for Chunnam Dragons, Jeonbuk Hyundai Motors and Jeju United.
