= Kim Deok-il =

South Korean footballer

Kim Deok-Il
Personal information
- Full name: Kim Deok-Il
- Date of birth: 11 July 1990 (age 36)
- Place of birth: South Korea
- Height: 1.78 m (5 ft 10 in)
- Position: Forward

Youth career
- Sungkyunkwan University

Senior career*
Years	Team	Apps	(Gls)
2011–2012	Seongnam Ilhwa	7	(0)
- * Club domestic league appearances and goals as of 30 November 2012

Kim Deok-Il (Korean: 김덕일; born 11 July 1990) is a South Korean footballer who plays as a forward.
