= Park Byeong-ju =

South Korean footballer (born 1985)

Personal information
- Date of birth: 24 March 1985 (age 41)
- Place of birth: Bonghwa, North Gyeongsang, South Korea
- Height: 1.85 m (6 ft 1 in)
- Position: Defender

Youth career
- 2001–2003: Cheonggu High School
- 2004–2007: Dankook University

Senior career*
| Years | Team | Apps | (Gls) |
| 2008 | Seongnam Ilhwa Chunma | 0 | (0) |
| 2009–2010 | Suwon City | 42 | (2) |
| 2011 | Gwangju FC | 21 | (0) |
| 2012 | Jeju United | 19 | (0) |
| 2013–2014 | Gwangju FC | 4 | (0) |
- * Club domestic league appearances and goals as of 23 November 2014

- Park Byeong-ju
- Hangul: 박병주
- Hanja: 朴炳柱
- RR: Bak Byeongju
- MR: Pak Pyŏngju

Park Byeong-ju (Korean: 박병주; Hanja: 朴炳柱; born 24 March 1985) is a South Korean retired footballer who played as a defender.

== Club career ==
Park drafted by Seongnam Ilhwa Chunma in 2008, after one of his less successful spells at Seongnam he joined National League side Suwon City FC in 2009. During two seasons, he appeared in 42 matches and scored 2 goals.

On 3 November 2011, Park was transferred to the newly founded Gwangju FC.

On 9 January 2012, Park left Gwangju for the K League rivals Jeju United, along with then teammate Heo Jae-won and then back to Gwangju in 2013, where he retired in 2014.
