= Han Yong-su =

South Korean footballer (born 1990)

Han Yong-Su
Personal information
- Full name: Han Yong-Su
- Date of birth: 5 May 1990 (age 36)
- Place of birth: Ongnyeon-dong, Yeonsu-gu, Incheon, South Korea
- Height: 1.84 m (6 ft 1/2 in)
- Position: Defender

Team information
- Current team: Gyeongnam FC

Youth career
- Hanyang University

Senior career*
Years	Team	Apps	(Gls)
2012–2015	Jeju United	23	(0)
2016–2017	FC Pocheon		
2018–2019	Gangwon FC	14	(0)
2020	Gwangju FC	0	(0)
2021	Chungnam Asan FC	35	(3)
2022-2023	Seoul E-Land FC	26	(1)
2024-	Gyeongnam FC		
Total		98	(4)

International career
2006–2007	South Korea U17	12	(0)
- * Club domestic league appearances and goals as of 5 January 2024

Han Yong-Su (Korean: 한용수; born 5 May 1990) is a South Korean footballer who plays as a defender for Gyeongnam FC.

== Career ==
On 30 December 2023, Yong-su left Seoul E-Land FC.

On 5 January 2024, he joined Gyeongnam FC.
