= Rush & Cash =

OK Financial Corp.
- Type: Private
- Industry: Finance/Private loans
- Founded: 1998
- Headquarters: Seoul, South Korea
- Area served: Japan, South Korea, China
- Key people: Yoon Choi (Chairman, President and CEO)
- Brands: Rush & Cash
- Number of employees: 1,600 (2013)
- Subsidiaries: OK Savings Bank, Apro Capital, onecashing
- Website: www.okfngroup.com

Rush & Cash is the representative private loan brand of Korea, by A&P Financial. It was originated from seven private lenders including A&O International Co. Ltd. which was founded by a major private lender in Japan in July 1998.

In Sep 2003 the Japanese parent company applied for eligibility to be subject to Company Rehabilitation Act, and the seven companies were put on the market through an open bidding. In March 2004, a third-generation Korean Japanese, Yoon Choi, acquired the companies.

A new brand Rush & Cash was launched In May 2004 in Japan and the seven companies were incorporated into one group in August 2007. The company name was changed to A&P Financial in January 2008, by taking the initials each from "Ace" meaning the top and "Professional"; the joined name "APRO" sounds like "future" or "advance" in Korean. Based on this idea, the name of the Group was christened as APRO Financial Group.

== See also ==
- Economy of South Korea
