= Bae Il-hwan =

South Korean footballer

Personal information
- Date of birth: 20 July 1988 (age 38)
- Place of birth: South Korea
- Height: 1.80 m (5 ft 11 in)
- Position: Forward

Youth career
- 2007–2009: Dankook University

Senior career*
Years	Team	Apps	(Gls)
2011–2018	Jeju United	98	(7)
2015–2016	→ Sangju Sangmu (army)	28	(3)
- * Club domestic league appearances and goals as of 1 January 2019

- Bae Il-hwan
- Hangul: 배일환
- Hanja: 裵日換
- RR: Bae Ilhwan
- MR: Pae Irhwan

Bae Il-hwan (Korean: 배일환; born 20 July 1988) is a retired South Korean footballer who played as a forward.

== Club career ==
He joined Jeju United FC in 2011. He scored his first goal at opening match of K-League 2012 against Incheon United.

== Club career statistics ==
As of 25 March 2012

Club performance			League		Cup		League Cup		Total	
Season	Club	League	Apps	Goals	Apps	Goals	Apps	Goals	Apps	Goals
South Korea			League		KFA Cup		League Cup		Total	
2011	Jeju United FC	K League 1	1	0	0	0	1	0	2	0
2012	Jeju United FC	K League 1	4	3	0	0	0	0	4	3
Career total			5	3	0	0	1	0	6	3
