= Oh Ban-suk =

South Korean footballer (born 1988)

Oh Ban-Suk
Personal information
- Date of birth: 20 May 1988 (age 38)
- Place of birth: Gwacheon, South Korea
- Height: 1.89 m (6 ft 2 in)
- Position: Centre-back

Youth career
- 2007–2010: Konkuk University

Senior career*
Years	Team	Apps	(Gls)
2011–2018	Jeju United	198	(7)
2018–2019	Al-Wasl	16	(1)
2019	→ Muangthong United (loan)	25	(2)
2020	Jeonbuk Hyundai Motors	0	(0)
2020	→ Incheon United (loan)	14	(0)
2021–2024	Incheon United	88	(2)
2025	Busan IPark	22	(1)

International career^{‡}
2018	South Korea	2	(0)
- * Club domestic league appearances and goals as of 7 January 2026 ‡ National team caps and goals as of 1 June 2018

- Oh Ban-suk
- Hangul: 오반석
- Hanja: 吳反錫
- RR: O Banseok
- MR: O Pansŏk

Oh Ban-Suk (Korean: 오반석; born 20 May 1988) is a South Korean former footballer who played as a centre-back.

In May 2018 he was named in South Korea's preliminary 28-man squad for the 2018 FIFA World Cup in Russia.

== Career statistics ==
=== Club ===
Updated to 25 February 2024.

Club performance			League		Cup		League Cup		Continental		Total	
Season	Club	League	Apps	Goals	Apps	Goals	Apps	Goals	Apps	Goals	Apps	Goals
South Korea			League		KFA Cup		League Cup		AFC		Total	
2012	Jeju United	K League 1	25	1	4	0	-		-		29	1
2013	Jeju United	K League 1	30	1	2	0	-		-		32	1
2014	Jeju United	K League 1	36	0	0	0	-		-		36	0
2015	Jeju United	K League 1	34	1	3	0	-		-		37	1
2016	Jeju United	K League 1	16	1	1	1	-		-		17	2
2017	Jeju United	K League 1	33	2	1	0	-		4	0	38	2
2018	Jeju United	K League 1	24	1	1	0	-		1	0	26	1
United Arab Emirates			League		President's Cup		League Cup		AFC		Total	
2018–19	Al-Wasl	UAE Pro-League	11	1	1	0	4	0	–		16	1
Thailand			League		Cup		League Cup		AFC		Total	
2019	Muangthong United (loan)	Thai League	25	2	2	0	0	0	0	0	27	2
South Korea			League		KFA Cup		League Cup		AFC		Total	
2020	Incheon United (loan)	K League 1	13	0	0	0	-		-		13	0
2021	Incheon United	K League 1	30	0	0	0	-		-		30	0
2022	Incheon United	K League 1	13	0	0	0	-		-		13	0
2023	Incheon United	K League 1	27	3	2	0	-		-		29	3
Career total			317	13	17	2	4	0	5	0	343	15

== Honours ==
=== Individual ===
- K League Classic Best XI : 2017
