= Jeon Soo-hyun =

South Korean footballer

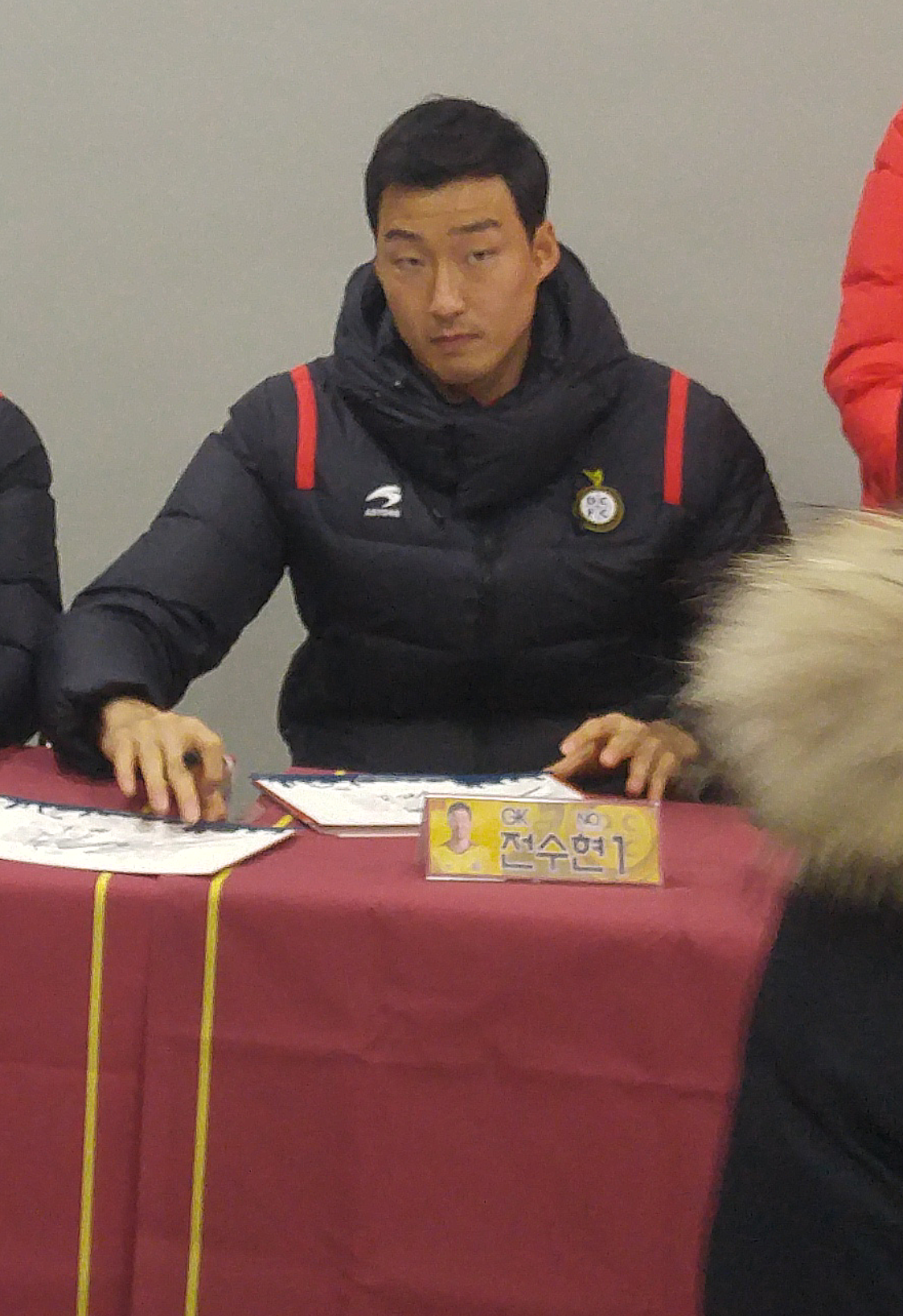

Personal information
- Date of birth: 18 August 1986 (age 40)
- Place of birth: Busan, South Korea
- Height: 1.95 m (6 ft 5 in)
- Position: Goalkeeper

Team information
- Current team: Suwon FC
- Number: 37

Youth career
- 2002–2004: Hyundai High School
- 2005–2008: University of Ulsan

Senior career*
Years	Team	Apps	(Gls)
2009–2016	Jeju United	34	(0)
2014–2015	→ Ansan Police (army)	31	(0)
2017	Daejeon Citizen	21	(0)
2018	FC Anyang	32	(0)
2019–	Suwon FC	8	(0)
Korean name
Hangul	전수현
RR	Jeon Suhyeon
MR	Chŏn Suhyŏn
Former name
Hangul	전태현
Hanja	全泰現
RR	Jeon Taehyeon
MR	Chŏn T'aehyŏn
- * Club domestic league appearances and goals as of 29 November 2019

Jeon Soo-hyun (Korean: 전수현; born 18 August 1986) is a South Korean footballer who plays as a goalkeeper for Suwon FC in the K League 2.
