= Ahn Jong-hun =

South Korean footballer

Ahn Jong-Hun
Personal information
- Full name: Ahn Jong-Hun
- Date of birth: 5 July 1989 (age 37)
- Place of birth: South Korea
- Height: 1.71 m (5 ft 7 1/2 in)
- Position: Forward

Youth career
- Chosun University

Senior career*
Years	Team	Apps	(Gls)
2011–2013	Jeju United	16	(0)
2012	→ Mokpo City (loan)	2	(0)
2014	Gwangju FC	15	(0)
- * Club domestic league appearances and goals as of 23 November 2014

Ahn Jong-Hun (Korean: 안종훈; born 5 July 1989) is a South Korean former footballer who plays as a forward.
