= Hong Chul =

South Korean footballer (born 1990)

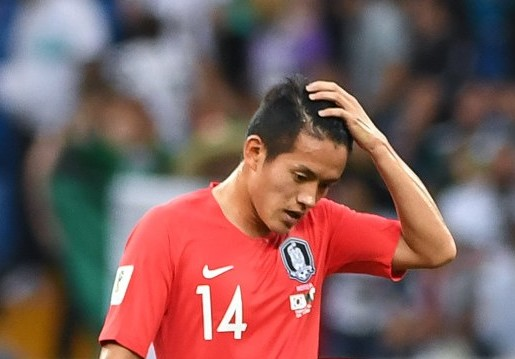
- Hong with South Korea at the 2018 FIFA World Cup

Personal information
- Full name: Hong Chul
- Date of birth: 17 September 1990 (age 36)
- Place of birth: Hwaseong, Gyeonggi, South Korea
- Height: 1.76 m (5 ft 9 in)
- Positions: Left-back; left winger

Team information
- Current team: Gangwon FC
- Number: 33

Youth career
- 2006–2009: Poongsaeng High School (Youth)

College career
| Years | Team | Apps | (Gls) |
| 2009 | Dankook University | | |

Senior career*
| Years | Team | Apps | (Gls) |
| 2010–2012 | Seongnam Ilhwa Chunma | 68 | (6) |
| 2013–2020 | Suwon Samsung Bluewings | 145 | (3) |
| 2017–2018 | → Sangju Sangmu (draft) | 49 | (2) |
| 2020–2021 | Ulsan Hyundai | 34 | (1) |
| 2022–2024 | Daegu FC | 88 | (2) |
| 2025- | Gangwon FC | 24 | (1) |

International career^{‡}
| 2009 | South Korea U-20 | 2 | (0) |
| 2010–2012 | South Korea U-23 | 12 | (1) |
| 2011– | South Korea | 47 | (1) |
Medal record
Men's football
Representing South Korea
Asian Games
| Bronze medal – third place | 2010 Guangzhou | Team |
EAFF Championship
| Winner | 2015 China | Team |
| Runner-up | 2022 Japan | Team |
- * Club domestic league appearances and goals as of 3 August 2026 ‡ National team caps and goals as of 5 December 2022

- Hong Chul
- Hangul: 홍철
- Hanja: 洪喆
- RR: Hong Cheol
- MR: Hong Ch'ŏl
- IPA: [hoŋ.tɕʰʌl]

Hong Chul (Korean: 홍철; born 17 September 1990) is a South Korean football player who plays for Gangwon FC and the South Korea national team.

== International career ==
In May 2018 he was named in South Korea's preliminary 28 man squad for the 2018 World Cup in Russia.

== Career statistics ==
=== Club ===
As of 16 September 2025

| Club performance | | | League | | KFA Cup | | League Cup | | Playoffs | | ACL | | Total | |
| Season | Club | League | Apps | Goals | Apps | Goals | Apps | Goals | Apps | Goals | Apps | Goals | Apps | Goals |
|---|---|---|---|---|---|---|---|---|---|---|---|---|---|---|
| 2010 | Seongnam Ilhwa Chunma | K League 1 | 18 | 1 | 3 | 0 | 4 | 1 | — | | 9 | 0 | 34 | 2 |
| 2011 | Seongnam Ilhwa Chunma | K League 1 | 20 | 3 | 4 | 0 | 4 | 1 | — | | — | | 28 | 4 |
| 2012 | Seongnam Ilhwa Chunma | K League 1 | 30 | 2 | 1 | 0 | — | | — | | 5 | 0 | 36 | 2 |
| 2013 | Suwon Samsung Bluewings | K League 1 | 34 | 2 | 1 | 0 | — | | — | | 5 | 0 | 40 | 2 |
| 2014 | Suwon Samsung Bluewings | K League 1 | 29 | 0 | 1 | 0 | — | | — | | — | | 30 | 0 |
| 2015 | Suwon Samsung Bluewings | K League 1 | 30 | 0 | 1 | 0 | — | | — | | 4 | 0 | 35 | 0 |
| 2016 | Suwon Samsung Bluewings | K League 1 | 12 | 0 | 3 | 0 | — | | — | | 0 | 0 | 15 | 0 |
| 2017 | Sangju Sangmu (draft) | K League 1 | 27 | 1 | 0 | 0 | — | | 2 | 0 | — | | 29 | 1 |
| 2018 | Sangju Sangmu (draft) | K League 1 | 22 | 1 | 0 | 0 | — | | — | | — | | 22 | 1 |
| 2018 | Suwon Samsung Bluewings | K League 1 | 8 | 0 | 1 | 0 | — | | — | | — | | 9 | 0 |
| 2019 | Suwon Samsung Bluewings | K League 1 | 30 | 1 | 6 | 0 | — | | — | | — | | 36 | 1 |
| 2020 | Suwon Samsung Bluewings | K League 1 | 2 | 0 | 0 | 0 | — | | — | | 2 | 0 | 4 | 0 |
| 2020 | Ulsan Hyundai | K League 1 | 13 | 0 | 4 | 0 | — | | — | | 3 | 0 | 20 | 0 |
| 2021 | Ulsan Hyundai | K League 1 | 21 | 1 | 2 | 0 | — | | — | | 8 | 0 | 31 | 1 |
| 2022 | Daegu FC | K League 1 | 28 | 0 | 3 | 0 | — | | — | | 4 | 1 | 35 | 1 |
| 2023 | Daegu FC | K League 1 | 29 | 1 | 0 | 0 | — | | — | | — | | 29 | 1 |
| 2024 | Daegu FC | K League 1 | 31 | 1 | 1 | 0 | — | | 1 | 0 | — | | 33 | 1 |
| 2025 | Gangwon FC | K League 1 | 15 | 1 | 1 | 0 | — | | — | | 1 | 1 | 17 | 2 |
| Total | South Korea | | 399 | 15 | 32 | 0 | 8 | 2 | 3 | 0 | 41 | 2 | 483 | 19 |
| Career total | | | 399 | 15 | 32 | 0 | 8 | 2 | 3 | 0 | 41 | 2 | 483 | 19 |

=== International goals ===
Scores and results list Korea's goal tally first.

| No | Date | Venue | Opponent | Score | Result | Competition |
|---|---|---|---|---|---|---|
| 1. | 24 July 2022 | Toyota Stadium, Toyota, Japan | Hong Kong | 2–0 | 3–0 | 2022 EAFF Championship |

== Honours ==
=== Club ===
Seongnam Ilhwa Chunma

- AFC Champions League: 2010
- FA Cup: 2011

Suwon Samsung Bluewings

- FA Cup (2): 2016, 2019

Ulsan Hyundai

- AFC Champions League: 2020

=== International ===
South Korea

- EAFF East Asian Cup: 2015

=== Individual ===
- K League 1 Best XI (4): 2014, 2015, 2018, 2019
