= Heo Jae-won =

South Korean footballer

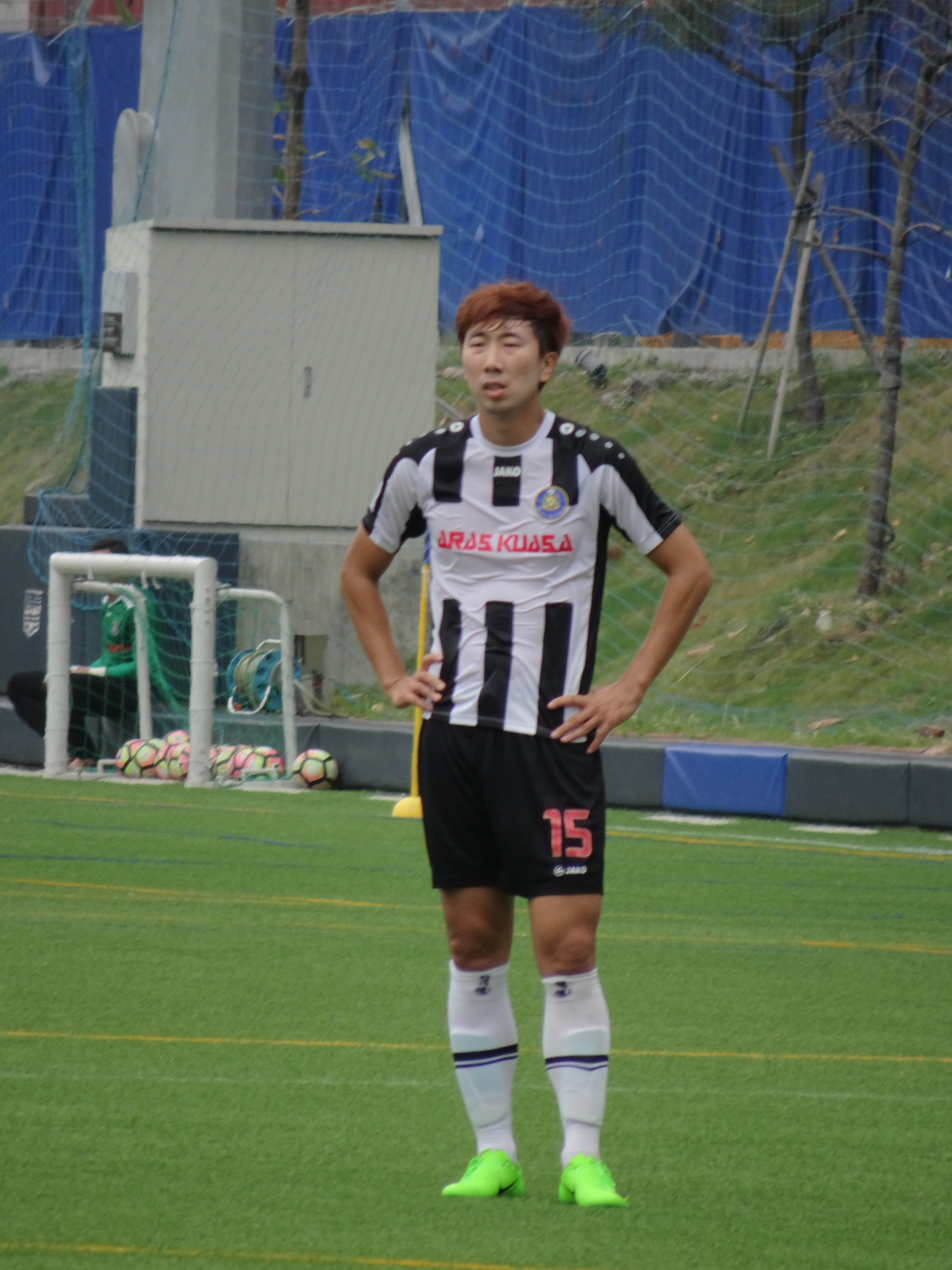
- Heo playing for Pahang FA in 2017

Personal information
- Full name: Heo Jae-Won
- Date of birth: 1 July 1984 (age 42)
- Place of birth: Uijeongbu, South Korea
- Height: 1.87 m (6 ft 2 in)
- Position: Defender

Youth career
- Kwangwoon University

Senior career*
Years	Team	Apps	(Gls)
2006–2010	Suwon Bluewings	6	(0)
2007–2008	→ Gwangju Sangmu (army)	4	(0)
2011	Gwangju FC	27	(1)
2012–2013	Jeju United	77	(4)
2014–2015	Daegu FC	59	(5)
2016	Al-Khor	10	(1)
2016	Dibba Al-Fujairah	9	(0)
2017	Pahang FA	20	(3)
2018	Jeonnam Dragons	15	(0)

International career^{‡}
2004	South Korea U20	11	(0)
2005	South Korea U23	8	(0)

Managerial career
- 2025: Life Sihanoukville
- * Club domestic league appearances and goals as of January 1, 2019 ‡ National team caps and goals as of January 25, 2017

Heo Jae-won (Korean: 허재원; Hanja: 許宰源; born 1 July 1984) is a South Korean football player and manager.

== Career statistics ==
As of end of 2011 season

Club performance			League		Cup		League Cup		Continental		Total	
Season	Club	League	Apps	Goals	Apps	Goals	Apps	Goals	Apps	Goals	Apps	Goals
South Korea			League		KFA Cup		League Cup		Asia		Total	
2006	Suwon Bluewings	K-League	0	0	0	0	1	0	–		1	0
2007	Gwangju Sangmu	K-League	0	0	0	0	0	0	–		0	0
2008	Gwangju Sangmu	K-League	4	0	0	0	3	0	–		7	0
2009	Suwon Bluewings	K-League	5	0	0	0	1	0	0	0	6	0
2010	Suwon Bluewings	K-League	1	0	0	0	1	1	0	0	2	1
2011	Gwangju FC	K-League	11	0	1	0	4	0	–		16	0
2012	Jeju United	K-League							–			
Career total			21	0	1	0	10	1	0	0	32	1
