= Yang Joon-a =

South Korean footballer (born 1989)

Yang Joon-A
Personal information
- Full name: Yang Joon-A
- Date of birth: June 13, 1989 (age 37)
- Place of birth: South Korea
- Height: 1.88 m (6 ft 2 in)
- Position: Defensive midfielder

Team information
- Current team: Gimpo FC

Youth career
- Korea University

Senior career*
Years	Team	Apps	(Gls)
2010–2011	Suwon Bluewings	15	(1)
2011–2015	Jeju United	39	(2)
2012	→ Jeonnam Dragons (loan)	9	(0)
2013–2015	→ Sangju Sangmu (army)	34	(3)
2016–2018	Jeonnam Dragons	54	(2)
2019–2021	Incheon United	30	(0)
2021-22	Police Tero	6	(0)
2022 -	Gimpo FC	17	(2)

International career^{‡}
2007–2009	South Korea U-20	12	(0)
- * Club domestic league appearances and goals as of 13 October 2022 ‡ National team caps and goals as of 20 June 2012

Yang Joon-A (Korean: 양준아; born June 13, 1989) is a South Korean football player playing for Gimpo FC in K-League 2.
