= Felipinho (footballer, born 1992) =

Brazilian footballer

Personal information
- Full name: Felipe Barreto da Silva
- Date of birth: January 29, 1992 (age 34)
- Place of birth: Porto Alegre, Brazil
- Height: 1.66 m (5 ft 5 1/2 in)
- Position: Forward

Team information
- Current team: Al-Muharraq SC

Youth career
- 2008–2011: SC Internacional

Senior career*
Years	Team	Apps	(Gls)
2009–2011	SC Internacional		
2011	Jeju United	1	(0)
2012	Atlético Paranaense		
2013	Monte Azul		
2014	Anápolis		
2014–	FC Osaka		
2016–	Al-Muharraq SC (loan)		

International career
2007	Brazil U-15		
2009	Brazil U-17	9	(1)
- * Club domestic league appearances and goals

Felipe Barreto da Silva, known as a Felipinho, is a Brazilian footballer who plays for Al-Muharraq SC.
