= Kang Soo-il =

South Korean footballer (born 1987)

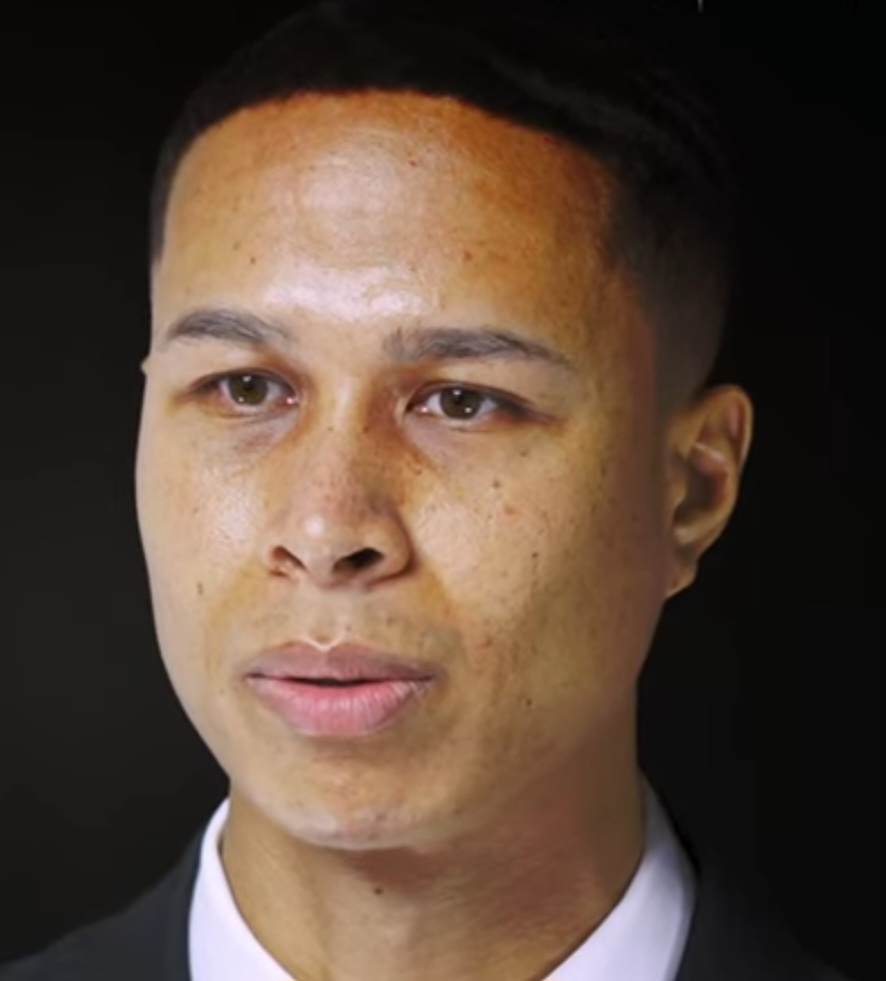

Personal information
- Full name: Kang Soo-il
- Date of birth: 15 July 1987 (age 39)
- Place of birth: Dongducheon, South Korea
- Height: 1.85 m (6 ft 1 in)
- Position: Forward

Team information
- Current team: Ansan Greeners
- Number: 28

Youth career
- 2002–2005: Sangji University

Senior career*
| Years | Team | Apps | (Gls) |
| 2007–2010 | Incheon United | 47 | (6) |
| 2011–2015 | Jeju United | 97 | (12) |
| 2014 | → Pohang Steelers (loan) | 29 | (6) |
| 2017 | Thespakusatsu Gunma | 22 | (10) |
| 2018–2019 | Ratchaburi Mitr Phol | 38 | (17) |
| 2019 | Tokyo Verdy | 3 | (0) |
| 2020 | Trat | 5 | (1) |
| 2021– | Ansan Greeners | 60 | (4) |
- * Club domestic league appearances and goals as of 7 January 2026 ‡ National team caps and goals as of 17:54, 24 July 2015 (UTC)

- Kang Soo-il
- Hangul: 강수일
- Hanja: 姜修一
- RR: Gang Suil
- MR: Kang Suil

Kang Soo-il (Korean: 강수일; born 15 July 1987) is a South Korean professional footballer, who is currently playing as a forward for Ansan Greeners.

He was awarded the MVP in the 2008 season of Reserve League.

== Career ==
Born to a Korean mother and an African American G.I. father, Kang dropped out of university to join Incheon United in 2007 in order to earn money to support his family after his mother suffered a back injury. He moved to Jeju United in 2011 and spent the 2014 season on loan at Pohang Steelers.

Eligible to play for both South Korea and United States, Kang opted to represent his country of birth. Called up to make his international debut for South Korea against UAE in June 2015, hours before the kick-off he was forced to withdraw after failing a doping test. He blamed his testing positive for anabolic steroid methyltestosterone on his use of moustache-growing cream. He did not contest the charge and accepted an automatic 15-game ban from the K-League.

== Club career statistics ==
As of 29 August 2015

| Club performance | | | League | | Cup | | League Cup | | Continental | | Total | |
| Season | Club | League | Apps | Goals | Apps | Goals | Apps | Goals | Apps | Goals | Apps | Goals |
| South Korea | | | League | | KFA Cup | | League Cup | | Asia | | Total | |
|---|---|---|---|---|---|---|---|---|---|---|---|---|
| 2007 | Incheon United | K League 1 | 2 | 0 | 0 | 0 | 0 | 0 | - | | 2 | 0 |
| 2008 | Incheon United | K League 1 | 2 | 0 | 0 | 0 | 3 | 0 | - | | 5 | 0 |
| 2009 | Incheon United | K League 1 | 22 | 4 | 1 | 0 | 4 | 1 | - | | 27 | 5 |
| 2010 | Incheon United | K League 1 | 21 | 2 | 3 | 0 | 4 | 2 | - | | 28 | 4 |
| 2011 | Jeju United | K League 1 | 24 | 3 | 2 | 1 | 1 | 0 | 3 | 0 | 30 | 4 |
| 2012 | Jeju United | K League 1 | 32 | 3 | 3 | 0 | - | | - | | 35 | 3 |
| 2013 | Jeju United | K League 1 | 27 | 1 | 2 | 0 | - | | - | | 29 | 1 |
| 2015 | Jeju United | K League 1 | 14 | 5 | 0 | 0 | - | | - | | 14 | 5 |
| 2014 | Pohang Steelers | K League 1 | 29 | 6 | 2 | 1 | - | | 2 | 0 | 33 | 7 |
| Career total | | | 173 | 24 | 13 | 2 | 12 | 3 | 5 | 0 | 203 | 29 |
