= 2025 FC Seoul season =

FC Seoul
2025 season
- Chairman: Huh Tae-soo
- Manager: Kim Gi-dong
- Stadium: Seoul World Cup Stadium
- K League: 6th
- Korea Cup: Quarter-finals
- AFC Champions League Elite: League stage
- Top goalscorer: League: Jesse Lingard (10); All: Jesse Lingard (13)
- Average home league attendance: 23,185
| Home colours | Away colours |

The 2025 season was FC Seoul's 42nd season in the K League 1, the top tier of South Korean football. The club also participated in the 2025 edition of the Korea Cup and in the 2025–26 AFC Champions League Elite.

== Players ==
| No. | Player | Nationality | Date of birth (age) | Previous club | Contract since | Contract end |
Goalkeepers
| 21 | Choi Chul-won | (South Korea) | 23 July 1994 (age 32) | (South Korea) Gimcheon Sangmu FC | 2023 | |
| 25 | Lim Jun-sub | (South Korea) | 22 August 2003 (age 23) | (South Korea) Jeju SK | 2025 | |
| 31 | Kang Hyeon-mu | (South Korea) | 13 March 1995 (age 31) | (South Korea) Gimcheon Sangmu FC | 2024 | |
| 71 | Yun Ki-wook | (South Korea) | 10 October 2006 (age 20) | Youth Team | 2025 | |
Defenders
| 3 | Ahn Jae-min | (South Korea) | 23 January 2003 (age 23) | (South Korea) Gimpo FC | 2022 | |
| 4 | Lee Sang-min | (South Korea) | 1 January 1998 (age 28) | (South Korea) Gimcheon Sangmu FC | 2021 | 2025 |
| 5 | Yazan Al-Arab | (Jordan) | 31 January 1996 (age 30) | (Qatar) Muaither SC | 2024 | |
| 15 | Kim Hyeon-deok | (South Korea) | 5 November 2004 (age 22) | (South Korea) Boin High School | 2023 | |
| 16 | Choi Jun | (South Korea) | 17 April 1999 (age 27) | (South Korea) Busan IPark | 2024 | |
| 18 | Jeong Tae-wook | (South Korea) | 16 May 1997 (age 29) | (Australia) Western Sydney Wanderers | 2025 | |
| 20 | Lee Han-do | (South Korea) | 16 March 1994 (age 32) | (South Korea) Busan IPark | 2025 | |
| 22 | Kim Jin-su | (South Korea) | 13 June 1992 (age 34) | (South Korea) Jeonbuk Hyundai Motors | 2025 | |
| 24 | Cho Young-kwang | (South Korea) | 11 March 2004 (age 22) | (Japan) FC Osaka | 2022 | |
| 33 | Bae Hyun-seo | (South Korea) | 16 February 2005 (age 21) | Youth Team | 2018 | |
| 36 | Kim Ji-Won | (South Korea) | 12 February 2004 (age 22) | (South Korea) Yangpyeong FC | 2023 | |
| 40 | Park Seong-hun | (South Korea) | 27 January 2003 (age 23) | Youth Team | 2016 | |
| 44 | Ham Sun-woo | (South Korea) | 28 January 2005 (age 21) | (South Korea) Shinpyeong High School | 2024 | |
| 63 | Park Soo-il | (South Korea) | 22 February 1996 (age 30) | (South Korea) Gimcheon Sangmu FC | 2023 | |
| 66 | Choi Jun-yeong | (South Korea) | 16 July 2005 (age 21) | (South Korea) Seongnam FC | 2017 | |
Midfielders
| 7 | Jeong Seung-won | (South Korea) | 27 February 1997 (age 29) | (South Korea) Suwon FC | 2025 | |
| 8 | Lee Seung-mo | (South Korea) | 30 March 1998 (age 28) | (South Korea) Pohang Steelers | 2023 | 2026 |
| 26 | Her Dong-min | (South Korea) | 9 March 2004 (age 22) | (South Korea) Chung-Ang University | 2024 | |
| 28 | Gbato Seloh Samuel^{Home Grown FP} | (Ivory Coast) | 1 August 2006 (age 20) | (South Korea) Youth Team | 2025 | |
| 29 | Ryu Jae-moon | (South Korea) | 8 November 1993 (age 33) | (South Korea) Jeonbuk Hyundai Motors | 2024 | |
| 41 | Hwang Do-yoon | (South Korea) | 9 April 2003 (age 23) | (South Korea) Korea University | 2023 | |
| 72 | Min Ji-hoon | (South Korea) | 31 March 2005 (age 21) | Youth Team | 2018 | 2025 |
| 88 | Park Jang Han-gyeol | (South Korea) | 15 February 2004 (age 22) | (South Korea) Boin High School | 2022 | |
Forwards
| 9 | Cho Young-wook | (South Korea) | 5 February 1999 (age 27) | (South Korea) Gimcheon Sangmu FC | 2018 | |
| 10 | Jesse Lingard | (England) | 15 December 1992 (age 33) | (England) Nottingham Forest | 2024 | 2025 |
| 11 | Cheon Seong-hoon | (South Korea) | 21 September 2000 (age 26) | (South Korea) Daejeon Hana Citizen | 2025 | |
| 14 | Son Seung-beom | (South Korea) | 4 May 2004 (age 22) | Youth Team | 2017 | |
| 27 | Moon Seon-min | (South Korea) | 9 June 1992 (age 34) | (South Korea) Jeonbuk Hyundai Motors | 2025 | 2025 |
| 32 | Patryk Klimala | (Poland) | 5 August 1998 (age 28) | (Australia) Sydney FC | 2025 | |
| 37 | Jung Han-min | (South Korea) | 8 January 2001 (age 25) | (South Korea) Gangwon FC | 2014 | |
| 45 | Marko Dugandžić | (Croatia) | 7 April 1994 (age 32) | (Saudi Arabia) Al-Tai FC (S1) | 2025 | |
| 70 | Anderson | (Brazil) | 16 July 1998 (age 28) | (South Korea) Suwon FC | 2025 | |
| 77 | Lucas Rodrigues | (Brazil) | 27 August 1999 (age 27) | (Portugal) Marítimo | 2024 | |
Players who went out on loan during season
| 1 | Baek Jong-bum | (South Korea) | 21 January 2001 (age 25) | (South Korea) Osan High School | 2019 | |
| 19 | Kang Ju-hyeok (M) | (South Korea) | 27 August 2006 (age 20) | (South Korea) Osan High School | 2024 | |
| 25 | Paik Sang-hoon | (South Korea) | 7 January 2002 (age 24) | Youth Team | 2015 | |
| 62 | Aleksandar Paločević | (Serbia) | 22 August 1993 (age 33) | (Serbia) OFK Beograd | 2021 | |
Players who left mid-season
| 6 | Ki Sung-yueng | (South Korea) | 24 January 1989 (age 37) | (Spain) RCD Mallorca | 2020 | 2025 |
| 11 | Kang Seong-jin | (South Korea) | 26 March 2003 (age 23) | Youth Team | 2016 | 2026 |
| 17 | Kim Jin-ya | (South Korea) | 30 June 1998 (age 28) | (South Korea) Incheon United | 2020 | |
| 23 | Lee Si-young | (South Korea) | 21 April 1997 (age 29) | (South Korea) Suwon Samsung Bluewings | 2023 | |
| 30 | Kim Ju-sung | (South Korea) | 12 December 2000 (age 25) | (South Korea) Gimcheon Sangmu FC | 2019 | 2025 |
| 42 | Kim Sin-jin | (South Korea) | 13 July 2001 (age 25) | (South Korea) Seoul E-Land FC | 2022 | |
| 94 | Willyan | (Brazil) | 17 February 1994 (age 32) | (South Korea) Daejeon Hana Citizen | 2023 | |

== Transfers ==
=== Pre-season ===
==== In ====
Transfers in

| Date | Position | Player | Transferred from | Ref |
Permanent Transfer
| 31 December 2024 | DF | (South Korea) Cho Young-kwang | (Japan) FC Osaka | End of loan |
| 31 December 2024 | DF | (South Korea) Choi Jun-yeong | (South Korea) Seongnam FC | End of loan |
| 31 December 2024 | DF | (South Korea) Ahn Jae-min | (South Korea) Gimpo FC | End of loan |
| 31 December 2024 | DF | (South Korea) Lee Si-young | (South Korea) Suwon Samsung Bluewings | End of loan |
| 31 December 2024 | MF | (Serbia) Aleksandar Palocevic | (Serbia) OFK Beograd | End of loan |
| 31 December 2024 | MF | (South Korea) Ahn Ji-man | (South Korea) Yeoju FC | End of loan |
| 31 December 2024 | FW | (South Korea) Jung Han-min | (South Korea) Gangwon FC | End of loan |
| 31 December 2024 | FW | (South Korea) Kim Kyeong-min | (South Korea) Gangwon FC | End of loan |
| 31 December 2024 | FW | (South Korea) Kim Shin-jin | (South Korea) Seoul E-Land FC | End of loan |
| 31 December 2024 | FW | (South Korea) Park Dong-jin | (South Korea) Gyeongnam FC | End of loan |
| 17 January 2025 | GK | (South Korea) Im Joon-seob | (South Korea) Jeju SK | Free |
| 17 January 2025 | DF | (South Korea) Lee Han-do | (South Korea) Busan IPark | Free |
| 17 January 2025 | DF | (South Korea) Kim Jin-su | (South Korea) Jeonbuk Hyundai Motors | Free |
| 17 January 2025 | MF | (South Korea) Jung Seung-won | (South Korea) Suwon FC | Free |
| 17 January 2025 | MF | (Ivory Coast) Gbato Seloh Samuel | (South Korea) FC Seoul U18 | Free |
| 17 January 2025 | FW | (South Korea) Moon Seon-min | (South Korea) Jeonbuk Hyundai Motors | Free |
| 27 February 2025 | FW | (Croatia) Marko Dugandžić | (Saudi Arabia) Al-Tai FC | Free |

==== Out ====
Transfers out

| Date | Position | Player | Transferred to | Ref |
Permanent Transfer
| 31 December 2024 | MF | (Portugal) Ronaldo Tavares | (Portugal) Estrela da Amadora | End of loan |
| 1 January 2025 | GK | (South Korea) Seo Ju-hwan | (South Korea) | Free |
| 1 January 2025 | DF | (South Korea) Hwang Hyun-soo | (Thailand) Ayutthaya United | Free (Note: Hwang Hyun-soo released on Jan-25 & joined new team in Jul-25) |
| 1 January 2025 | FW | (South Korea) Lim Sang-hyub | Retired | N.A. |
| 17 January 2025 | GK | (South Korea) Hwang Sung-min | (South Korea) Incheon United | Free |
| 17 January 2025 | DF | (South Korea) Kwon Wan-kyu | (South Korea) Suwon Samsung Bluewings | Free |
| 17 January 2025 | DF | (South Korea) Yoon Jong-gyu | (South Korea) Ulsan HD FC | Undisclosed |
| 17 January 2025 | DF | (South Korea) Kang Sang-woo | (South Korea) Ulsan HD FC | Free |
| 17 January 2025 | FW | (South Korea) Park Dong-jin | (South Korea) Jeju SK | Free |
| 17 January 2025 | FW | (Russia) Stanislav Iljutcenko | (South Korea) Suwon Samsung Bluewings | Free |
| 23 January 2025 | MF | (South Korea) Ahn Ji-man | (South Korea) Hwaseong FC | Free |
Loan Transfer
| 1 January 2024 | DF | (South Korea) Park Soo-il | (South Korea) Gimcheon Sangmu FC | Military Service |
| 17 January 2025 | GK | (South Korea) Lee Seung-hwan | (South Korea) Chungbuk Cheongju FC | Season loan |
| 26 February 2025 | MF | (Serbia) Aleksandar Palocevic | (China) Nantong Zhiyun | Season loan |
| 7 April 2025 | GK | (South Korea) Baek Jong-bum | (South Korea) Gimcheon Sangmu FC | Military Service |

=== Mid-season ===
==== In ====
Transfers in

| Date | Position | Player | Transferred from | Ref |
Permanent Transfer
| 3 June 2025 | DF | (South Korea) Park Soo-il | (South Korea) Gimcheon Sangmu FC | End of Military Service |
| 4 June 2025 | FW | (Poland) Patryk Klimala | (Poland) Śląsk Wrocław | Undisclosed |
| 7 July 2025 | FW | (Brazil) Anderson | (South Korea) Suwon FC | Exchange for (Brazil) Willyan, and (South Korea) Lee Si-young |
| 24 July 2025 | FW | (South Korea) Cheon Seong-hoon | (South Korea) Daejeon Hana Citizen | Undisclosed |
Loan Transfer
| 24 July 2025 | DF | (South Korea) Jeong Tae-wook | (South Korea) Jeonbuk Hyundai Motors | Season loan till Dec 2025 (Note: Jeong moved to FC Seoul for loan after returning from Australia.) |

==== Out ====
Transfers out

| Date | Position | Player | Transferred to | Ref |
Permanent Transfer
| 20 June 2025 | DF | (South Korea) Kim Jin-ya | (South Korea) Daejeon Hana Citizen | Undisclosed |
| 3 July 2025 | MF | (South Korea) Ki Sung-yueng | (South Korea) Pohang Steelers | Undisclosed |
| 7 July 2025 | DF | (South Korea) Lee Si-young | (South Korea) Suwon FC | Exchange for (Brazil) Anderson |
| 7 July 2025 | FW | (Brazil) Willyan | (South Korea) Suwon FC | Exchange for (Brazil) Anderson |
| 24 July 2025 | MF | (South Korea) Kim Sin-jin | (South Korea) Gangwon FC | Free |
| 31 July 2025 | DF | (South Korea) Kim Ju-sung | (Japan) Sanfrecce Hiroshima | US$1 million |
Loan Transfer
| 24 July 2025 | MF | (South Korea) Kang Seong-jin | (South Korea) Suwon Samsung Bluewings | Season loan |
| 17 November 2025 | MF | (South Korea) Kang Ju-hyeok | (South Korea) Gimcheon Sangmu FC | Military Service |

=== Post-season ===
==== In ====
Transfers in

| Date | Position | Player | Transferred from | Ref |
Permanent Transfer
| 24 December 2025 | GK | (South Korea) Gu Sung-yun | (South Korea) Seoul E-Land | Free |
| 25 December 2025 | MF | (South Korea) Kang Seong-jin | (South Korea) Suwon Samsung Bluewings | End of loan |
| 31 December 2025 | GK | (South Korea) Lee Seung-hwan | (South Korea) Chungbuk Cheongju FC | End of loan |
| 31 December 2025 | MF | (Serbia) Aleksandar Palocevic | (China) Nantong Zhiyun | End of loan |
| 1 January 2026 | FW | (Brazil) Leonardo Acevedo | (South Korea) Seongnam FC | Free |
| December 2025 | MF | (Croatia) Hrvoje Babec | (Croatia) NK Osijek | Undisclosed |
Loan Transfer

==== Out ====
Transfers out

| Date | Position | Player | Transferred to | Ref |
Permanent Transfer
| 26 December 2025 | MF | (South Korea) Kang Seong-jin | (South Korea) | Free |
| 31 December 2025 | DF | (South Korea) Jeong Tae-wook | (South Korea) Jeonbuk Hyundai Motors | End of loan |
| 31 December 2025 | MF | (England) Jesse Lingard | | Free |
| 31 December 2025 | FW | (South Korea) Cho Young-wook | (South Korea) Jeonbuk Hyundai Motors | Free |
| 31 December 2025 | GK | (South Korea) Choi Chul-won | (South Korea) | Free |
| 31 December 2025 | DF | (South Korea) Choi Jun-yeong | (South Korea) | Free |
| 31 December 2025 | MF | (South Korea) Ryu Jae-moon | (South Korea) Daegu FC | Free |
| 31 December 2025 | MF | (South Korea) Her Dong-min | (South Korea) | Free |
| 31 December 2025 | FW | (Croatia) Marko Dugandžić | (Saudi Arabia) | Free |
| 31 December 2025 | FW | (South Korea) Jung Han-min | (South Korea) Pohang Steelers | Free |
| 31 December 2025 | FW | (South Korea) Son Seung-beom | (South Korea) | Free |
Loan Transfer
| 26 December 2025 | MF | (South Korea) Min Ji-hoon | (South Korea) Chungbuk Cheongju | Season loan |
| 26 December 2025 | DF | (South Korea) Bae Hyun-seo | (South Korea) Gyeongnam FC | Season loan |
| 26 December 2025 | DF | (South Korea) Kim Hyeon-deok | (South Korea) Gimhae FC 2008 | Season loan |

== Friendly matches ==
Win Draw Loss

| 29 January 2025 1 | FC Seoul (South Korea) | 8–2 | (China) Shenzhen 2028 FC | Japan |

| 1 February 2025 2 | FC Seoul (South Korea) | 4–4 | (Japan) Kashiwa Reysol | Japan |

| 6 February 2025 3 | FC Seoul (South Korea) | 5–0 | Japan University of Economics | Japan |

| 6 February 2025 4 | FC Seoul (South Korea) | 0–1 | (Japan) Honda FC | Japan |

| 9 February 2025 5 | FC Seoul (South Korea) | 4–1 | (Japan) Zweigen Kanazawa | Japan |

=== Mid-season ===
| 31 July 2025 Barcelona World Tour | FC Seoul (South Korea) | 3–7 | (Spain) Barcelona | Seoul, South Korea |
| | Cho Young-wook 26'; Al-Arab 45+1'; Do-Yun Hwang (yellow card) 68'; Jung Han-min 85' | Report | Lewandowski 8'; Yamal 14', 45+3'; Christensen 55'; Torres 74', 88'; Gavi 76' | Stadium: Seoul World Cup Stadium; Attendance: 62,482; Referee: Kim Dae-yong (South Korea) |

== Competitions ==
=== Overall record ===
| Competition | First match | Last match | Starting round | Final position | Record | | | | | | | |
| Competition | First match | Last match | Starting round | Final position | Pld | W | D | L | GF | GA | GD | Win % |
|---|---|---|---|---|---|---|---|---|---|---|---|---|
| K League 1 | 15 February | 30 November | Matchday 1 | 6th | 38 | 12 | 13 | 13 | 50 | 52 | −2 | 31.58 |
| Korea Cup | 14 May | 2 July | Round of 16 | Quarter-finals | 2 | 1 | 0 | 1 | 2 | 2 | +0 | 50.00 |
| ACLE | 16 September | 10 December | League stage | TBD | 6 | 2 | 3 | 1 | 8 | 5 | +3 | 33.33 |
| Total | | | | | 46 | 15 | 16 | 15 | 60 | 59 | +1 | 32.61 |

Source: Soccerway

=== K League 1 ===
==== Matches ====
As usual, the league season is played over 38 matches. After 33 league matches between the 12 participating teams, the teams are split into the final round (top 6 teams) and relegation round (bottom 6 teams).

| 15 February 2025 1 | Jeju SK | 2–0 | FC Seoul | Seogwipo |
| | Kim Jun-ha 15'; Lee Kun-Hee 58' | Report | Lee Si-young (yellow card) 67' | Stadium: Jeju World Cup Stadium; Attendance: 11,049; Referee: Choi Kwang-ho |

| 22 February 2025 2 | FC Seoul | 2–1 | FC Anyang | Seoul |
| | Jesse Lingard 48'; Lucas Rodrigues 78'; Kim Jin-su (yellow card) 28' | Report | Kim Jeong-hyun (yellow card) 35'; Ri Yong-jik (yellow card) 74'; Choi Sung-Bum (yellow card) 90' | Stadium: Seoul World Cup Stadium; Attendance: 41,415; Referee: Ko Hyeong-jin |

| 3 March 2025 3 | FC Seoul | 0–0 | Gimcheon Sangmu FC | Seoul |
| | Son Seung-Beom (yellow card) 20'; Kim Ju-sung (yellow card) 75' | Report | Seo Min-woo (yellow card) 19'; Lee Dong-Jun (yellow card) 29'; Won Ki-jong (yellow card) 90+2' | Stadium: Seoul World Cup Stadium; Attendance: 24,889; Referee: Seol Tae-hwan |

| 8 March 2025 4 | Suwon FC | 0–0 | FC Seoul | Suwon |
| | Yoon Bit-garam (yellow card) 51' | Report | | Stadium: Suwon Sports Complex; Attendance: 8,661; Referee: Chae Sang-hyeop |

| 15 March 2025 5 | Gangwon FC | 0–1 | FC Seoul | Chuncheon |
| | Marko Tući (yellow card) 61'; Vitor Gabriel (yellow card) 90+1' | Report | Cho Young-wook 19'; Lee Seung-Mo (yellow card) 64'; Jesse Lingard (yellow card) 76' | Stadium: Chuncheon Songam Sports Town; Attendance: 10,231; Referee: Shin Yong-jun |

| 29 March 2025 6 | FC Seoul | 3–2 | Daegu FC | Seoul |
| | Jesse Lingard 45+5' (pen.) (penalty missed) 76; Jeong Seung-won 90+1' (yellow card) 90+2'; Moon Seon-min 90+4'; Kim Ju-sung (yellow card) 48' | Report | Kyohei Yoshino 58' (yellow card) 45+4'; Jeong Chi-In (yellow card) 90+2' | Stadium: Seoul World Cup Stadium; Attendance: 25,258; Referee: Kim Chong-hyuk |

| 5 April 2025 7 | Ulsan HD | 0–0 | FC Seoul | Ulsan |
| | Kang Sang-Woo (yellow card) 5'; Lee Jin-hyun (yellow card) 75' | Report | Willyan (yellow card) 34' | Stadium: Ulsan Munsu Football Stadium; Attendance: 20,358; Referee: Ko Hyung-jin |

| 12 April 2025 8 | FC Seoul | 2–2 | Daejeon Hana Citizen | Seoul |
| | Moon Seon-min 58'; Jesse Lingard 66'; Kim Jin-su (yellow card) 78' | Report | Vladislavs Gutkovskis 43', 45+2' (pen.) | Stadium: Seoul World Cup Stadium; Attendance: 20,284; Referee: Song Min-seok |

| 20 April 2025 9 | FC Seoul | 1–2 | Gwangju FC | Seoul |
| | Jesse Lingard 79' (yellow card) 70' | Report | Isnairo Morais 43'; Park Tae-jun 63'; Bruno Souza (yellow card) 10'; Kim Han-gil (yellow card) 85'; Kim Kyung-min (yellow card) 90+7'; Oh Hoo-sung (yellow card) 90+8' | Stadium: Seoul World Cup Stadium; Attendance: 19,234; Referee: Lee Dong-jun |

| 27 April 2025 10 | Pohang Steelers | 1–0 | FC Seoul | Pohang |
| | Oberdan 7'; Hong Yun-sang (yellow card) 90+7' | Report | Jesse Lingard (yellow card) 40'; Lee Tae-seok (yellow card) 60'; Yazan Al-Arab (yellow card) 68'; Kim Jin-su (yellow card) 90+4' | Stadium: Pohang Steel Yard; Attendance: 10,984; Referee: Kim Dae-young |

| 3 May 2025 11 | FC Seoul | 0–1 | Jeonbuk Hyundai Motors | Seoul |
| | Kim Ju-sung (yellow card) 79' | Report | Song Min-kyu 24'; Han Kook-young (yellow card) 84'; Park Jin-seop (yellow card) 85'; Tiago Orobó (yellow card) 90+8' | Stadium: Seoul World Cup Stadium; Attendance: 48,008; Referee: Song Min-seok |

| 6 May 2025 12 | FC Anyang | 1–1 | FC Seoul | Anyang |
| | Matheus Oliveira Santos 52' (yellow card) 90+1'; Lee Chang-yong (yellow card) 51'; Kim Young-chan (yellow card) 62' | Report | Moon Seon-min 81'; Ryu Jae-moon (yellow card) 41'; Yazan Al-Arab (yellow card) 46'; Choi Jun (yellow card) 90+1' | Stadium: Anyang Stadium; Attendance: 10,103; Referee: Chae Sang-Hyeop |

| 10 May 2025 13 | Daejeon Hana Citizen | 0–0 | FC Seoul | Daejeon |
| | Kim Moon-hwan (yellow card) 60'; Kim In-Gyun (yellow card) 77'; Choi Geon-ju (yellow card) 90' | Report | Ryu Jae-moon (yellow card) 58'; Kim Jin-su (yellow card) 90+1' | Stadium: Daejeon World Cup Stadium; Attendance: 13,706; Referee: Kim Chong-hyuk |

| 18 May 2025 14 | Daegu FC | 0–1 | FC Seoul | Daegu |
| | Lee Chan-dong (yellow card) 27'; Kyohei Yoshino (yellow card) 72'; Jeong Chi-In (yellow card) 83' | Report | Marko Dugandžić 48'; Jeong Seung-won (yellow card) 7'; Kang Hyun-Moo (yellow card) 89' | Stadium: DGB Daegu Bank Park; Attendance: 11,699; Referee: Ko Hyung-jin |

| 24 May 2025 15 | FC Seoul | 1–1 | Suwon FC | Seoul |
| | Lucas Rodrigues 43'; Choi Jun (yellow card) 38'; Hwang Do-yun (yellow card) 64'; Jesse Lingard (yellow card) 64' | Report | Anderson Oliveira 55'; Luan Dias (yellow card) 64'; Roh Kyung-ho (yellow card) 84' | Stadium: Seoul World Cup Stadium; Attendance: 25,578; Referee: Choi Kwang-ho |

| 28 May 2025 16 | Gimcheon Sangmu FC | 0–1 | FC Seoul | Gimcheon |
| | Kim Kang-San (yellow card) 34' | Report | Lucas Rodrigues 81' | Stadium: Gimcheon Stadium; Attendance: 2,840; Referee: Ko Hyung-jin |

| 31 May 2025 17 | FC Seoul | 1–3 | Jeju SK | Seoul |
| | Yazan Al-Arab 70' | Report | Yoo In-soo 23', 68'; Lee Chang-min 50'; Italo (yellow card) 29'; Nam Tae-hee (yellow card) 82'; Lim Chai-min (yellow card) 83' | Stadium: Seoul World Cup Stadium; Attendance: 24,270; Referee: Lee Dong-Jun |

| 13 June 2025 18 | Gwangju FC | 1–3 | FC Seoul | Gwangju |
| | Reis 90+5'; Jin Si-Woo (yellow card) 42' | Report | Jeong Seung-won 10'; Marko Dugandžić 55'; Moon Seon-min 68'; Park Seong-Hoon (yellow card) 6' | Stadium: Gwangju Football Stadium; Attendance: 2,746; Referee: Kim Woo-sung |

| 17 June 2025 19 | FC Seoul | 1–1 | Gangwon FC | Seoul |
| | Moon Seon-min 72'; Choi Jun (yellow card) 45+2' | Report | Lee Sang-heon 25'; Lee Ki-hyuk (yellow card) 60'; Shin Min-Ha (yellow card) 78' | Stadium: Seoul World Cup Stadium; Attendance: 15,290; Referee: Choi Kwang-ho |

| 21 June 2025 20 | Jeonbuk Hyundai Motors | 1–1 | FC Seoul | Jeonju |
| | Song Min-kyu 45+2' | Report | Ryu Jae-moon 25' | Stadium: Jeonju World Cup Stadium; Attendance: 22,862; Referee: Ko Hyung-jin |

| 29 June 2025 21 | FC Seoul | 4–1 | Pohang Steelers | Seoul |
| | Jesse Lingard 17'; Lucas Rodrigues 33'; Marko Dugandžić 45+4' (yellow card) 45+3'; Patryk Klimala 85'; Kim Ju-sung (yellow card) 14' | Report | Lee Dong-Hee 75'; Oberdan (red card) 29' | Stadium: Seoul World Cup Stadium; Attendance: 20,036; Referee: Kim Chong-hyuk |

| 20 July 2025 22 | FC Seoul | 1–0 | Ulsan HD | Seoul |
| | Jesse Lingard 42'; Kim Ju-sung (yellow card) 66'; Kim Jin-su (yellow card) 75' | Report | Seo Myong-Gwan (yellow card) 36'; Ko Seung-Beom (yellow card) 45+3'; Kim Young-gwon (yellow card) 45+4'; Lee Jae-ik (yellow card) 90+2' | Stadium: Seoul World Cup Stadium; Attendance: 24,047; Referee: Ko Hyung-jin |

| 23 July 2025 23 | Jeju SK | 3–2 | FC Seoul | Seogwipo |
| | Yuri 38'; Lee Chang-min 64'; Rim Chang-woo 90+5' (yellow card) 90+5'; Choi Jun (yellow card) 60' | Report | Cho Young-wook 45+1'; Park Seong-Hoon 59' (yellow card) 25'; Kim Ryun-seong (yellow card) 53'; Choi Byung-Wook (yellow card) 73' | Stadium: Jeju World Cup Stadium; Attendance: 7,084; Referee: Jeong Dong-sik |

| 27 July 2025 24 | Daejeon Hana Citizen | 0–1 | FC Seoul | Daejeon |
| | Lee Soon-min (yellow card) 42' | Report | Jesse Lingard 56' (pen.); Anderson (yellow card) 43'; Marko Dugandžić (yellow card) 90+4'; Moon Seon-min (yellow card) 90+8' | Stadium: Daejeon World Cup Stadium; Attendance: 11,029; Referee: Kim Dae-young |

| 8 August 2025 25 | FC Seoul | 2–2 | Daegu FC | Seoul |
| | Kim Jin-su 13'; Lucas Rodrigues 40'; Jeong Tae-uk (yellow card) 22'; Soo-Il Park (yellow card) 53' | Report | Cesinha 34'; Jeong Chin-in 64'; Kim Jin-hyuk (yellow card) 13'; Kim Jung-hyeon (yellow card) 38'; Carlos Jatobá (yellow card) 56' | Stadium: Seoul World Cup Stadium; Attendance: 15,778; Referee: Kim Jong-hyuk |

| 17 August 2025 26 | Gimcheon Sangmu FC | 6–2 | FC Seoul | Gimcheon |
| | Won Ki-jong 10'; Kim Seung-Sub 18'; Maeng Seong-ung 45+4'; Lee Dong-gyeong 52' (pen.); Lee Dong-jun 90+1' (yellow card) 90+6'; Kim Chan 90+14' (pen.); Go Jae-hyeon (yellow card) 90+5' | Report | Cho Young-wook 27'; Anderson Oliveira 40'; Jesse Lingard (yellow card) 12'; Lee Seung-mo (yellow card) 45'; Park Soo-Il (yellow card) 62' | Stadium: Gimcheon Stadium; Attendance: 2,667; Referee: Park Byeon-jin |

| 24 August 2025 27 | FC Seoul | 3–2 | Ulsan HD | Seoul |
| | Choi Jun 6'; Cho Young-wook 31'; Hwang Do-Yun 39'; Marko Dugandžić (yellow card) 21'; Anderson (yellow card) 90+6' | Report | Ko Seung-Beom 23' (yellow card) 49'; Erick Farias 90+4'; Choi Seok-Hyun (yellow card) 90+6' | Stadium: Seoul World Cup Stadium; Attendance: 20,737; Referee: Ko Hyung-jin |

| 31 August 2025 28 | FC Seoul | 1–2 | FC Anyang | Seoul |
| | Kwon Kyung-won 48' (o.g.); Cho Young-wook (yellow card) 52'; Jesse Lingard (yellow card) 60' | Report | Thomas Oude Kotte 4' (yellow card) 90+1'; Bruno Mota 79' (yellow card) 90'; Kwon Kyung-won (yellow card) 26'; Kim Un (yellow card) 52'; Kim Jeong-hyun (yellow card) 52'; Lee Tae-hee (yellow card) 67' | Stadium: Seoul World Cup Stadium; Attendance: 20,027; Referee: Kim Yong-woo |

| 13 September 2025 29 | Gangwon FC | 3–2 | FC Seoul | Chuncheon |
| | Lee You-hyeon 40'; Kim Kun-hee 52' (pen.); Lee Sang-heon 55'; Kim Dae-won (yellow card) 26' | Report | Cho Young-wook 66'; Kim Jin-su 75'; Anderson (yellow card) 72'; Ryu Jae-moon (yellow card) 77'; Marko Dugandžić (yellow card) 90+2' | Stadium: Chuncheon Songam Sports Town; Attendance: 7,572; Referee: Ko Hyung-jin |

| 21 September 2025 30 | FC Seoul | 3–0 | Gwangju FC | Seoul |
| | Marko Dugandžić 68' (yellow card) 31'; Lee Seung-mo 80'; Moon Seon-min 84'; Choe Cheol Won (yellow card) 84' | Report | Byeon Jun-soo (yellow card) 45+3' | Stadium: Seoul World Cup Stadium; Attendance: 15,221; Referee: Kim Chong-hyuk |

| 27 September 2025 31 | FC Seoul | 1–1 | Jeonbuk Hyundai Motors | Seoul |
| | Yeon Je-woon 90+6' (o.g.); Lee Seung-Mo (yellow card) 90+7' | Report | Song Min-kyu 84' (yellow card) 84'; Kim Tae-hwan (yellow card) 71'; Tiago Orobó (yellow card) 89' | Stadium: Seoul World Cup Stadium; Attendance: 31,348; Referee: Seol Tae-hwan |

| 8 October 2025 32 | Suwon FC | 1–1 | FC Seoul | Suwon |
| | Luan Dias 18'; Kim Tae-han (yellow card) 42'; Lee Hyun Yong (yellow card) 82' | Report | Cho Young-wook 25' | Stadium: Suwon Sports Complex; Attendance: 7,304; Referee: Kim Dae-yong |

| 18 October 2025 33 | FC Seoul | 1–2 | Pohang Steelers | Seoul |
| | Cho Young-wook 68'; Anderson (yellow card) 75'; Jesse Lingard (yellow card) 82' | Report | Lee Ho-jae 29' (yellow card) 59'; Juninho Rocha 85' (yellow card) 90+2'; Lee Han-do (yellow card) 45+2'; Shin Kwang-Hoon (yellow card) 82'; Oberdan (yellow card) 90' | Stadium: Seoul World Cup Stadium; Attendance: 23,672; Referee: Shin Yong-jun |

| 26 October 2025 34 | FC Seoul | 4–2 | Gangwon FC | Seoul |
| | Jesse Lingard 70', 78' (yellow card) 76'; Ryu Jae-moon 80'; Cheon Seong-hoon 90+10'; Park Seong-hun (yellow card) 68' | Report | Kim Kun-hee 12'; Mo Jae-hyeon 52' | Stadium: Seoul World Cup Stadium; Attendance: 12,177; Referee: Ko Hyeong-jin |

| 1 November 2025 35 | Daejeon Hana Citizen | 3–1 | FC Seoul | Daejeon |
| | Anton Kryvotsyuk 47'; Masatoshi Ishida 76' (yellow card) 74'; Yu Kang-hyun 84'; Kim Bong-soo (yellow card) 54'; Masatoshi Ishida (yellow card) 74' | Report | Ha Chang-rae 54' (o.g.); Hwang Do-yoon (yellow card) 14' | Stadium: Daejeon World Cup Stadium; Attendance: 9,353; Referee: Kim Chong-hyuk |

| 9 November 2025 36 | Pohang Steelers | 0–0 | FC Seoul | Pohang |
| | | Report | | Stadium: Pohang Steel Yard; Attendance: 10,493; Referee: Chae Sang-hyeop |

| 22 November 2025 37 | FC Seoul | 1–3 | Gimcheon Sangmu FC | Seoul |
| | Jesse Lingard 45+2'; Choi Jun (yellow card) 49' (yellow-red card) | Report | Kim Ju-chan 33'; Park Se-jin 89'; Park Tae-jun 90+4' | Stadium: Seoul World Cup Stadium; Attendance: 13,247; Referee: Shin Yong-Jun |

| 30 November 2025 38 | Jeonbuk Hyundai Motors | 2–1 | FC Seoul | Jeonju |
| | Lee Dong-jun 55'; Jeon Jin-woo 90+2' (pen.) (yellow card) 90+2'; Kim Tae-hyun (yellow card) 26' | Report | Park Su-il 59'; Jesse Lingard (yellow card) 90+6' | Stadium: Jeonju World Cup Stadium; Attendance: 21,742; Referee: Kim Chong-hyuk |

| Pos | Team | Pld | W | D | L | GF | GA | GD | Pts | Qualification or relegation (Note: Teams played each other three times (33 matches), before the league was split into two groups, the top six and the bottom six.) |
|---|---|---|---|---|---|---|---|---|---|---|
| 4 | Pohang Steelers | 38 | 16 | 8 | 14 | 41 | 46 | −5 | 56 | Qualification for Champions League Elite league stage |
| 5 | Gangwon FC | 38 | 13 | 13 | 12 | 37 | 41 | −4 | 52 | Qualification for Champions League Elite preliminary stage |
| 6 | FC Seoul | 38 | 12 | 13 | 13 | 50 | 52 | −2 | 49 | Qualification for Champions League Two group stage |
| 7 | Gwangju FC | 38 | 15 | 9 | 14 | 40 | 41 | −1 | 54 | |
| 8 | FC Anyang | 38 | 14 | 7 | 17 | 49 | 47 | +2 | 49 | |

Source: Soccerway K League
Rules for classification: 1) Points; 2) Goals scored; 3) Goal difference; 4) Wins; 5) Head-to-head points

=== Korea Cup ===
| 14 May 2025 Round of 16 | Daejeon Korail | 1–2 | FC Seoul | Daejeon |
| | Lee Sang-hyeob 23' | | Cho Young-wook 21'; Kang Seong-jin 75'; Kang Hyun-Moo (yellow card) 90' | Stadium: Daejeon Hanbat Sports Complex |

| 2 July 2025 Quarter-final | FC Seoul | 0–1 | Jeonbuk Hyundai Motors | Seoul |
| | Patryk Klimala (yellow card) 85'; Ryu Jae-moon (yellow card) 90' | | Song Min-kyu 85'; Park Jin-seob (yellow card) 82'; Kwon Chang-hoon (yellow card) 83'; Kim Jeong-hoon (yellow card) 90+7' | Stadium: Seoul World Cup Stadium |

=== 2025–26 AFC Champions League Elite ===
Win Draw Loss

==== League stage ====
| 16 September 2025 Matchday 1 | Machida Zelvia (Japan) | 1–1 | (South Korea) FC Seoul | Machida, Japan |
| | Henry Hiroki Mochizuki 80' | Report | Marko Dugandžić 59'; Kim Jin-su (yellow card) 82' | Stadium: Machida GION Stadium; Attendance: 4,798; Referee: Asker Nadjafaliev (Uzbekistan) |

| 30 September 2025 Matchday 2 | FC Seoul (South Korea) | 3–0 | (Thailand) Buriram United | Seoul, South Korea |
| | Choi Jun 38'; Jeong Seung-won 45+3'; Lucas Rodrigues 68' (yellow card) 27' | Report | Peter Zulj (yellow card) 61' | Stadium: Seoul World Cup Stadium; Attendance: 6,443; Referee: Abdulrahman Al-Jassim (Qatar) |

| 22 October 2025 Matchday 3 | Shanghai Shenhua (China) | 2–0 | (South Korea) FC Seoul | Shanghai, China |
| | Luis Nlavo 58'; André Luis 89' | Report | Kim Jin-su (yellow card) 26'; Ryu Jae-moon (yellow card) 45' | Stadium: Pudong Football Stadium; Attendance: 39,093; Referee: Abdullah Jamali (Kuwait) |

| 4 November 2025 Matchday 4 | FC Seoul (South Korea) | 0–0 | (China) Chengdu Rongcheng | Seoul, South Korea |
| | Kim Jin-su (yellow card) 77' | Report | Pedro Delgado (yellow card) 85' | Stadium: Seoul World Cup Stadium; Attendance: 6,279; Referee: Nazmi Nasaruddin (Malaysia) |

| 25 November 2025 Matchday 5 | Shanghai Port (China) | 1–3 | (South Korea) FC Seoul | Shanghai, China |
| | Mateus Vital 61'; Lyu Wenjun (yellow card) 30'; Zhang Linpeng (yellow card) 86' | Report | Jesse Lingard 47', 77' (yellow card) 86'; Lucas Silva 67'; Lee Seung-Mo (yellow card) 56' | Stadium: Shanghai Stadium; Attendance: 11,501; Referee: Khaled Al-Hoish (Saudi Arabia) |

| 10 December 2025 Matchday 6 | FC Seoul (South Korea) | 1–1 | (Australia) Melbourne City | Seoul, South Korea |
| | Jesse Lingard 31' (yellow card) 88'; Hwang Do-Yun (yellow card) 15'; Choi Jun (yellow card) 30'; Kim Jin-Su (yellow card) 57'; Yazan Al Arab (yellow card) 77' | Report | Takeshi Kanamori 74'; Elbasan Rashani (yellow card) 46' | Stadium: Seoul World Cup Stadium; Attendance: 8,106; Referee: Mohanad Qasim Eessee Sarray (Iraq) |

| Pos | Team | Pld | W | D | L | GF | GA | GD | Pts | Qualification |
|---|---|---|---|---|---|---|---|---|---|---|
| 5 | (Australia) Melbourne City | 8 | 4 | 2 | 2 | 9 | 7 | +2 | 14 | Advance to round of 16 |
| 6 | (Malaysia) Johor Darul Ta'zim | 8 | 3 | 2 | 3 | 8 | 7 | +1 | 11 | Advance to round of 16 |
| 7 | (South Korea) FC Seoul | 8 | 2 | 4 | 2 | 10 | 9 | +1 | 10 | Advance to round of 16 |
| 8 | (South Korea) Gangwon FC | 8 | 2 | 3 | 3 | 9 | 11 | −2 | 9 | Advance to round of 16 |
| 9 | (South Korea) Ulsan HD | 8 | 2 | 3 | 3 | 6 | 8 | −2 | 9 | |

Source: AFC
Rules for classification: 1) points; 2) goal difference; 3) number of goals scored; 4) number of matches won; 5) penalty shoot-out if only two teams remain tied and played each other on the final matchday 6) fair play ranking; 7) drawing of lots

== Team statistics ==
=== Appearances and goals ===
As of 10 Dec 2025

| No. | Pos. | Player | K-League | | FA Cup | | 2025–26 AFC Champions League Elite | | Total | |
| No. | Pos. | Player | Apps | Goals | Apps | Goals | Apps | Goals | Apps | Goals |
|---|---|---|---|---|---|---|---|---|---|---|
| 1 | GK | (South Korea) Baek Jong-bum | 0 | 0 | 0 | 0 | 0 | 0 | 0 | 0 |
| 3 | DF | (South Korea) Ahn Jae-min | 0 | 0 | 0 | 0 | 0 | 0 | 0 | 0 |
| 4 | DF | (South Korea) Lee Sang-min | 0 | 0 | 0 | 0 | 0 | 0 | 0 | 0 |
| 5 | DF | (Jordan) Yazan Al-Arab | 33 | 1 | 1+1 | 0 | 4 | 0 | 39 | 1 |
| 7 | MF | (South Korea) Jeong Seung-won | 31+2 | 2 | 1 | 0 | 5+1 | 1 | 40 | 3 |
| 8 | MF | (South Korea) Lee Seung-mo | 16+16 | 1 | 0+1 | 0 | 5+1 | 0 | 39 | 1 |
| 9 | FW | (South Korea) Cho Young-wook | 25+8 | 7 | 1 | 1 | 0+4 | 0 | 38 | 8 |
| 10 | FW | (England) Jesse Lingard | 30+4 | 10 | 1 | 0 | 6 | 3 | 41 | 13 |
| 11 | FW | (South Korea) Cheon Seong-hoon | 0+9 | 1 | 0 | 0 | 3+2 | 0 | 14 | 1 |
| 14 | FW | (South Korea) Son Seung-beom | 3+2 | 0 | 0 | 0 | 0 | 0 | 5 | 0 |
| 15 | DF | (South Korea) Kim Hyeon-deok | 0+1 | 0 | 0 | 0 | 0 | 0 | 1 | 0 |
| 16 | DF | (South Korea) Choi Jun | 28+3 | 1 | 0 | 0 | 5 | 1 | 36 | 2 |
| 18 | DF | (South Korea) Jeong Tae-wook | 2 | 0 | 0 | 0 | 2 | 0 | 4 | 0 |
| 20 | DF | (South Korea) Lee Han-do | 7+1 | 0 | 0 | 0 | 1+1 | 0 | 10 | 0 |
| 21 | GK | (South Korea) Choi Chul-won | 6+2 | 0 | 0 | 0 | 3 | 0 | 11 | 0 |
| 22 | DF | (South Korea) Kim Jin-su | 36 | 2 | 1 | 0 | 3+1 | 0 | 41 | 2 |
| 24 | DF | (South Korea) Cho Young-kwang | 0 | 0 | 0 | 0 | 0 | 0 | 0 | 0 |
| 25 | GK | (South Korea) Im Joon-seob | 0 | 0 | 0 | 0 | 0 | 0 | 0 | 0 |
| 26 | MF | (South Korea) Her Dong-min | 0 | 0 | 0 | 0 | 0 | 0 | 0 | 0 |
| 27 | FW | (South Korea) Moon Seon-min | 7+28 | 6 | 0+2 | 0 | 0+6 | 0 | 43 | 6 |
| 28 | MF | (Ivory Coast) Gbato Seloh Samuel | 1+1 | 0 | 1 | 0 | 0 | 0 | 3 | 0 |
| 29 | MF | (South Korea) Ryu Jae-moon | 14+5 | 2 | 1 | 0 | 2+4 | 0 | 26 | 2 |
| 31 | GK | (South Korea) Kang Hyeon-mu | 30 | 0 | 2 | 0 | 3 | 0 | 35 | 0 |
| 32 | FW | (Poland) Patryk Klimala | 1+3 | 1 | 0+1 | 0 | 0 | 0 | 5 | 1 |
| 33 | DF | (South Korea) Bae Hyun-seo | 0 | 0 | 1 | 0 | 0 | 0 | 1 | 0 |
| 36 | MF | (South Korea) Kim Ji-Won | 0 | 0 | 0 | 0 | 0+1 | 0 | 1 | 0 |
| 37 | FW | (South Korea) Jung Han-min | 5+8 | 0 | 0+1 | 0 | 0 | 0 | 14 | 0 |
| 40 | DF | (South Korea) Park Seong-hun | 11+3 | 1 | 1 | 0 | 5 | 0 | 20 | 1 |
| 41 | MF | (South Korea) Hwang Do-yoon | 26+7 | 1 | 1+1 | 0 | 5+1 | 0 | 41 | 1 |
| 44 | DF | (South Korea) Ham Sun-woo | 0 | 0 | 0 | 0 | 0 | 0 | 0 | 0 |
| 45 | FW | (Croatia) Marko Dugandžić | 14+17 | 4 | 1 | 0 | 3+1 | 1 | 36 | 5 |
| 63 | DF | (South Korea) Park Soo-il | 16+1 | 1 | 1 | 0 | 4 | 0 | 22 | 1 |
| 66 | DF | (South Korea) Choi Jun-yeong | 0 | 0 | 0 | 0 | 0 | 0 | 0 | 0 |
| 70 | FW | (Brazil) Anderson | 12+3 | 1 | 0 | 0 | 2+3 | 0 | 20 | 1 |
| 71 | GK | (South Korea) Yun Ki-wook | 0 | 0 | 0 | 0 | 0 | 0 | 0 | 0 |
| 72 | MF | (South Korea) Min Ji-hoon | 0 | 0 | 0 | 0 | 0 | 0 | 0 | 0 |
| 77 | FW | (Brazil) Lucas Rodrigues | 23+8 | 4 | 1+1 | 0 | 5+1 | 2 | 39 | 6 |
| 88 | MF | (South Korea) Park Jang Han-gyeol | 0+2 | 0 | 1 | 0 | 0 | 0 | 3 | 0 |
Players featured on a match but left the club on-loan
| 11 | FW | (South Korea) Kang Seong-jin | 1+4 | 0 | 1 | 1 | 0 | 0 | 6 | 1 |
| 19 | MF | (South Korea) Kang Ju-hyeok | 2+1 | 0 | 1 | 0 | 0 | 0 | 4 | 0 |
Players featured on a match but left the club mid-season permanently
| 6 | MF | (South Korea) Ki Sung-yueng | 5+3 | 0 | 0 | 0 | 0 | 0 | 8 | 0 |
| 17 | DF | (South Korea) Kim Jin-ya | 0+5 | 0 | 1 | 0 | 0 | 0 | 6 | 0 |
| 23 | DF | (South Korea) Lee Si-young | 0+1 | 0 | 1 | 0 | 0 | 0 | 2 | 0 |
| 30 | DF | (South Korea) Kim Ju-sung | 22+1 | 0 | 2 | 0 | 0 | 0 | 25 | 0 |
| 42 | FW | (South Korea) Kim Sin-jin | 0+2 | 0 | 0 | 0 | 0 | 0 | 2 | 0 |
| 94 | FW | (Brazil) Willyan | 2+5 | 0 | 0 | 0 | 0 | 0 | 7 | 0 |
