= 2024 FC Seoul season =

FC Seoul
2024 season
- Chairman: Huh Tae-soo
- Manager: Kim Gi-dong
- Stadium: Seoul World Cup Stadium
- K League 1: 4th
- Korea Cup: Quarter-finals
- Top goalscorer: League: Stanislav Iljutcenko (14); All: Stanislav Iljutcenko (14)
- Average home league attendance: 27,838
Home colours	Away colours	Third colours

The 2024 season was FC Seoul's 41st season in the K League 1, the top tier of South Korean football. The club also participated in the 2024 edition of the Korea Cup.

== Players ==
No.	Player	Nationality	Date of birth (age)	Previous club	Contract since	Contract end
Goalkeepers
1	Baek Jong-bum	(South Korea)	21 January 2001 (age 25)	(South Korea) Osan High School	2019	
18	Hwang Sung-min	(South Korea)	23 June 1991 (age 35)	(South Korea) Gyeongnam FC	2022	
21	Choi Chul-won	(South Korea)	23 July 1994 (age 32)	(South Korea) Gimcheon Sangmu FC	2023	
31	Kang Hyeon-mu	(South Korea)	13 March 1995 (age 31)	(South Korea) Gimcheon Sangmu FC	2024	
99	Seo Ju-hwan	(South Korea)	24 June 1999 (age 27)	(South Korea) Ulsan HD FC	2022	
Defenders
3	Kwon Wan-kyu	(South Korea)	20 November 1991 (age 34)	(South Korea) Seongnam FC	2023	
4	Lee Sang-min	(South Korea)	1 January 1998 (age 28)	(South Korea) Gimcheon Sangmu FC	2021	2025
5	Yazan Al-Arab	(Jordan)	31 January 1996 (age 30)	(Qatar) Muaither SC	2024	
16	Choi Jun	(South Korea)	17 April 1999 (age 27)	(South Korea) Busan IPark	2024	
17	Kim Jin-ya	(South Korea)	30 June 1998 (age 28)	(South Korea) Incheon United	2020	
20	Kim Hyeon-deok	(South Korea)	5 November 2004 (age 21)	(South Korea) Boin High School	2023	
30	Kim Ju-sung	(South Korea)	12 December 2000 (age 25)	(South Korea) Gimcheon Sangmu FC	2019	2025
33	Bae Hyun-seo	(South Korea)	16 February 2005 (age 21)	Youth Team	2018	
40	Park Seong-hun	(South Korea)	27 January 2003 (age 23)	Youth Team	2016	
44	Ham Sun-woo	(South Korea)	28 January 2005 (age 21)	(South Korea) Shinpyeong High School	2024	
98	Yoon Jong-gyu	(South Korea)	20 March 1998 (age 28)	(South Korea) Gimcheon Sangmu FC	2017	2025
	Cho Young-kwang	(South Korea)	11 March 2004 (age 22)	(Japan) FC Osaka	2022	
	Choi Jun-yeong	(South Korea)	16 July 2005 (age 21)	(South Korea) Seongnam FC	2017	
	Ahn Jae-min	(South Korea)	23 January 2003 (age 23)	(South Korea) Gimpo FC	2022	
	Lee Shi-yeong	(South Korea)	21 April 1997 (age 29)	(South Korea) Suwon Samsung Bluewings	2023	
	Kim Jin-su	(South Korea)	13 June 1992 (age 34)	(South Korea) Jeonbuk Hyundai Motors	2025	
Midfielders
6	Ki Sung-yueng	(South Korea)	24 January 1989 (age 37)	(Spain) RCD Mallorca	2020	2025
8	Lee Seung-mo	(South Korea)	30 March 1998 (age 28)	(South Korea) Pohang Steelers	2023	2026
23	Her Dong-min	(South Korea)	9 March 2004 (age 22)	(South Korea) Chung-Ang University	2024	
25	Paik Sang-hoon	(South Korea)	7 January 2002 (age 24)	Youth Team	2015	
27	Min Ji-hoon	(South Korea)	31 March 2005 (age 21)	Youth Team	2018	2025
29	Ryu Jae-moon	(South Korea)	8 November 1993 (age 32)	(South Korea) Jeonbuk Hyundai Motors	2024	
39	Kang Ju-hyeok	(South Korea)	27 August 2006 (age 20)	(South Korea) Osan High School	2024	
41	Hwang Do-yoon	(South Korea)	9 April 2003 (age 23)	(South Korea) Korea University	2023	
42	Park Jang Han-gyeol	(South Korea)	15 February 2004 (age 22)	(South Korea) Boin High School	2022	
	Ahn Ji-man	(South Korea)	11 January 2003 (age 23)	(South Korea) Yeoju FC	2023	
Forwards
10	Jesse Lingard	(England)	15 December 1992 (age 33)	(England) Nottingham Forest	2024	2025
11	Kang Seong-jin	(South Korea)	26 March 2003 (age 23)	Youth Team	2016	2026
19	Lucas Rodrigues	(Brazil)	27 August 1999 (age 27)	(Portugal) Marítimo	2024	
28	Son Seung-beom	(South Korea)	4 May 2004 (age 22)	Youth Team	2017	
32	Cho Young-wook	(South Korea)	5 February 1999 (age 27)	(South Korea) Gimcheon Sangmu FC	2018	
94	Willyan	(Brazil)	17 February 1994 (age 32)	(South Korea) Daejeon Hana Citizen	2023	
	Jung Han-min	(South Korea)	8 January 2001 (age 25)	(South Korea) Gangwon FC	2014	
	Kim Kyeong-min	(South Korea)	22 January 1997 (age 29)	(South Korea) Gangwon FC	2022	
	Kim Sin-jin	(South Korea)	13 July 2001 (age 25)	(South Korea) Seoul E-Land FC	2022	
	Moon Seon-min	(South Korea)	9 June 1992 (age 34)	(South Korea) Jeonbuk Hyundai Motors	2025	2025
Players who went out on loan during season
	Aleksandar Paločević	(Serbia)	22 August 1993 (age 33)	(Serbia) OFK Beograd	2021	
Players who left mid-season

== Competitions ==
=== Overview ===
Competition	First match	Last match	Starting round	Final position	Record							
Competition	First match	Last match	Starting round	Final position	Pld	W	D	L	GF	GA	GD	Win %
K League 1	1 March	24 November	Matchday 1	4th	38	16	10	12	55	42	+13	42.11
FA Cup	19 June	17 July	Round of 16	Quarterfinal	2	0	1	1	1	5	−4	0.00
Total					40	16	11	13	56	47	+9	40.00

Last updated: 1 January 2025
Source: FC Seoul Official Website

=== K League 1 ===
==== League table ====
Pos	Team	Pld	W	D	L	GF	GA	GD	Pts	Qualification or relegation (Note: Teams played each other three times (33 matches), before the league was split into two groups, the top six and the bottom six.)
2	Gangwon FC	38	19	7	12	62	56	+6	64	Qualification for Champions League Elite league stage
3	Gimcheon Sangmu (Note: Military-owned team Gimcheon Sangmu cannot qualify for AFC competitions.)	38	18	9	11	55	41	+14	63	
4	FC Seoul	38	16	10	12	55	42	+13	58	Qualification for Champions League Elite league stage
5	Suwon FC	38	15	8	15	54	57	−3	53	
6	Pohang Steelers	38	14	11	13	53	50	+3	53	Qualification for Champions League Two group stage (Note: Qualified as Korea Cup champions.)

Source: Soccerway K League
Rules for classification: 1) Points; 2) Goals scored; 3) Goal difference; 4) Wins; 5) Head-to-head points

== Awards ==
=== Player of the Round ===
Round	Player of the Round
3	(South Korea) Ki Sung-yueng
5	(Germany) Stanislav Iljutcenko
20	(South Korea) Han Seung-gyu
38	(South Korea) Cho Young-wook

=== Manager of the Month ===
- August: (South Korea) Kim Gi-dong

=== Save of the Month ===
- August: (South Korea) Kang Hyeon-mu
- September: (South Korea) Kang Hyeon-mu
- October: (South Korea) Kang Hyeon-mu
