= Jesse Lingard =

English footballer (born 1992)

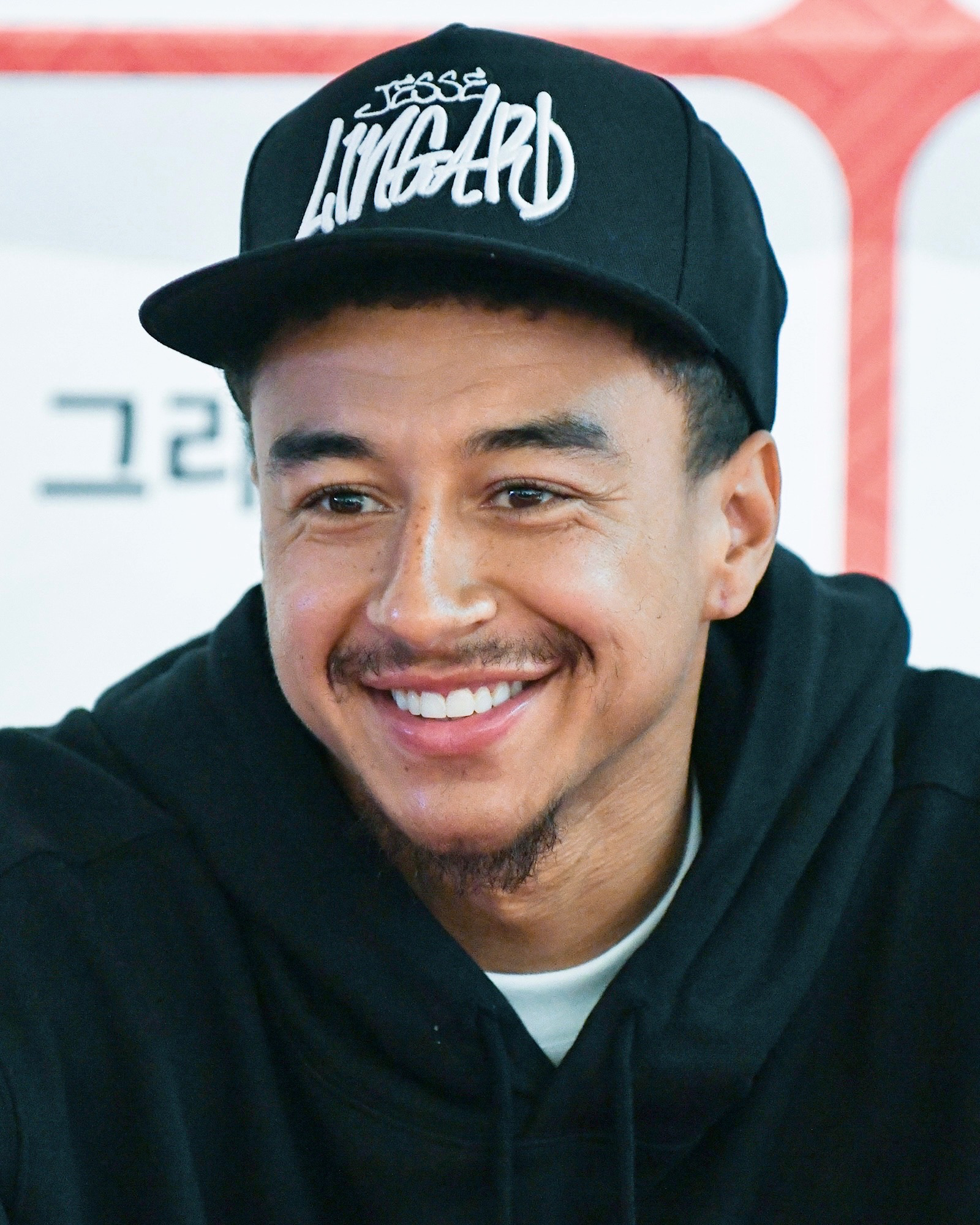
- Lingard in 2024

Personal information
- Full name: Jesse Ellis Lingard
- Date of birth: 15 December 1992 (age 33)
- Place of birth: Warrington, Cheshire, England
- Height: 5 ft 9 in (1.75 m)
- Positions: Attacking midfielder; winger

Team information
- Current team: Corinthians
- Number: 77

Youth career
- Fletcher Moss Rangers
- –2000: Penketh United
- 2000–2011: Manchester United

Senior career*
Years	Team	Apps	(Gls)
2011–2022	Manchester United	149	(20)
2012–2013	→ Leicester City (loan)	5	(0)
2013–2014	→ Birmingham City (loan)	13	(6)
2014	→ Brighton & Hove Albion (loan)	15	(3)
2015	→ Derby County (loan)	14	(2)
2021	→ West Ham United (loan)	16	(9)
2022–2023	Nottingham Forest	17	(0)
2024–2025	FC Seoul	60	(16)
2026–	Corinthians	20	(0)

International career
2008	England U17	3	(0)
2013–2015	England U21	11	(2)
2016–2021	England	32	(6)
Medal record
Men's football
Representing England
UEFA Nations League
Third place	2019 Portugal
- * Club domestic league appearances and goals as of 21:55, 18 November 2026 (UTC)

Jesse Ellis Lingard (born 15 December 1992) is an English professional footballer who plays as an attacking midfielder or winger for Campeonato Brasileiro Série A club Corinthians. He has won the UEFA Europa League, FA Cup, EFL Cup, and FA Community Shield, being one of only three players to score in all of the latter three finals.

Lingard made his senior debut while on loan at Leicester City in 2012, and spent time on loan at Birmingham City and Brighton & Hove Albion during the 2013–14 season and at Derby County in 2015. He broke into the Manchester United first-team under Louis van Gaal in 2015, and was a regular in the side until 2019, when he fell out of favour under Ole Gunnar Solskjær and struggled to regain his place in the team. A productive loan spell with West Ham United in 2021 saw Lingard rediscover his form, scoring nine goals in 16 appearances. He returned to Manchester United for one more year until he was released at the end of the 2021–22 season. He signed a one-year contract at Nottingham Forest, before being released at the end of the 2022–23 season. Seven months later, he joined South Korean club FC Seoul. He joined Corinthians in 2026.

Lingard represented England at under-17 and under-21 levels, before making his senior international debut in October 2016 and representing his country at the 2018 FIFA World Cup, where England finished fourth.

== Early life ==
Jesse Ellis Lingard was born on 15 December 1992 in Warrington, Cheshire, and attended William Beamont Community High School. He also attended Ashton-on-Mersey School Sixth Form due to their partnership with Manchester United.

== Club career ==
=== Manchester United ===
==== Youth career ====
Having played for Fletcher Moss Rangers and Penketh United as a youngster, Lingard joined Manchester United's youth academy at the age of seven and progressed through the age groups. He was part of the Manchester United team that won the 2010–11 FA Youth Cup, before signing a professional contract in July 2011.

After moving up to the reserves/under 21s, Lingard won back-to-back championships with the club in 2011–12 and 2012–13 He also won the Manchester Senior Cup and Lancashire Senior Cup with the team.

==== 2011–12 season ====
Lingard was first included in a senior matchday squad on 30 November 2011, in the League Cup quarter-finals against Crystal Palace at Old Trafford, remaining unused as the team lost 2–1 after extra time. He had his only other call-up of the season on 4 January 2012, again unused in a 3–0 away Premier League loss to Newcastle United.

==== 2012–13 season: Loan to Leicester City ====
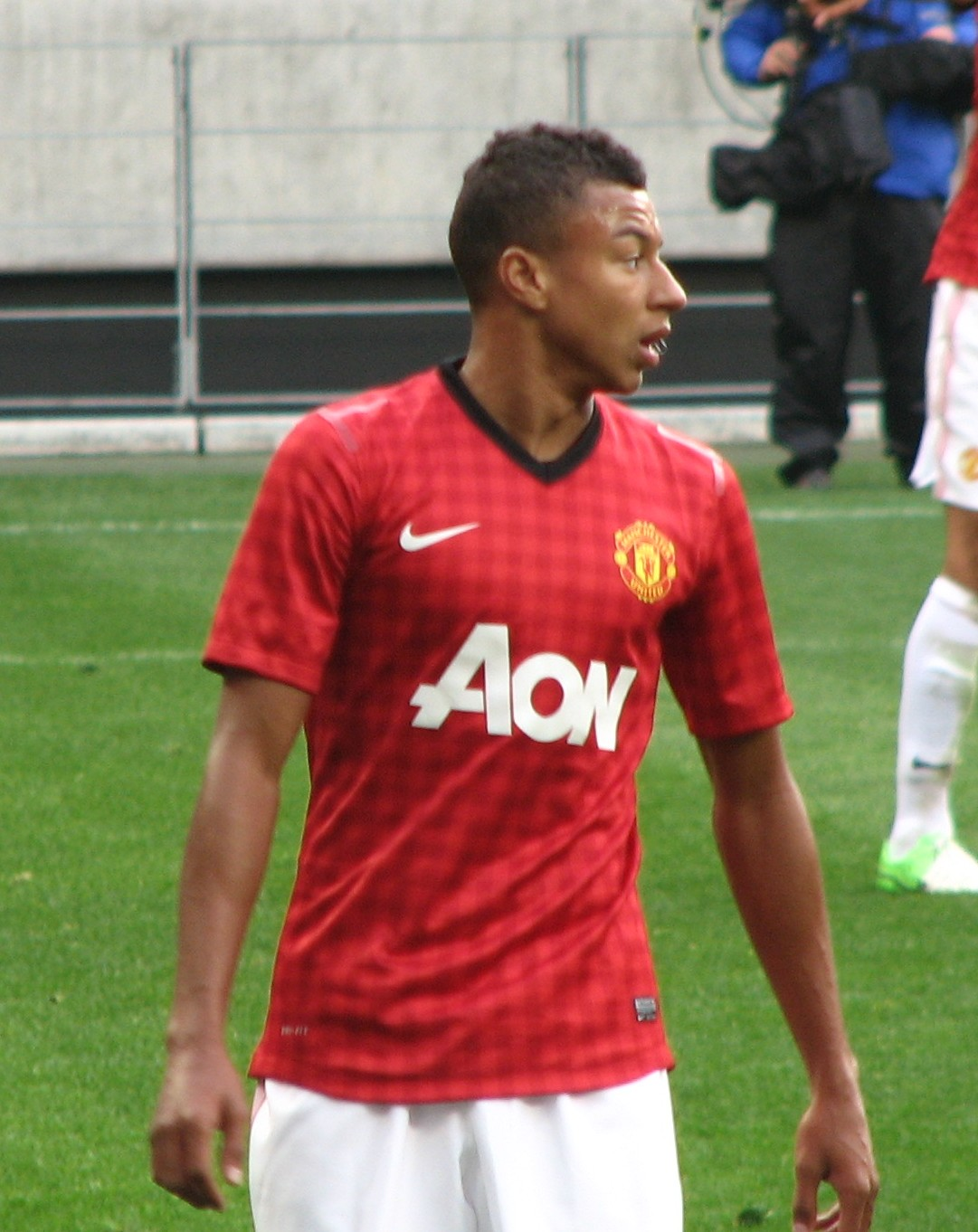
Lingard during the Manchester United pre-season friendlies in 2012

On 6 November 2012, Lingard and teammate Michael Keane joined Leicester City on loan for a month. He made his competitive debut later that day, in a 0–0 Championship draw away to Bolton Wanderers, coming on as a substitute for Martyn Waghorn in the 85th minute. His loan was later extended to 2 January 2013, and he totalled five appearances for the Foxes.

==== 2013–14 season ====
Lingard was selected in the 19-man squad for Manchester United's 2013 pre-season tour. He scored his first two goals for United in a 5–1 friendly win against the A-League All Stars in Sydney on 20 July, the first of which was the club's first goal under new manager David Moyes. After the match, he said "I believe in myself but I have to start believing in myself more". He also scored against Yokohama F. Marinos and Kitchee SC to finish the tour as top scorer with four goals in as many matches.

Although he had hoped to "skip the loan stage this time and break straight through" at Manchester United, Lingard joined Birmingham City on a month's loan on 19 September, and went straight into the starting eleven for the Championship match against Sheffield Wednesday at St Andrew's two days later. He opened the scoring after 20 minutes with his first goal in senior football when goalkeeper Chris Kirkland parried Chris Burke's shot, completed his hat-trick 13 minutes later, and scored a fourth in the second half to secure a 4–1 win. Lingard was unavailable for Birmingham's League Cup third-round tie because Manchester United did not want him cup-tied, then in his third league match, he made up for missing a penalty, awarded when he was fouled apparently outside the area, with an 89th-minute header to complete a 4–0 defeat of Millwall. Agreement was reached to extend Lingard's loan until 14 December, but he then missed three matches while receiving treatment at Manchester United for a knee injury. The loan was further extended, to 1 January 2014, but Lingard was suspended for the last two matches of the spell. He was sent off during a match against Wigan Athletic on 26 December for a lunge on Jordi Gómez immediately after being refused a free kick when he appeared to be fouled.

Although Birmingham hoped to extend the loan, Lingard returned to Manchester United and was an unused substitute in the match against Swansea City on 11 January.

On 27 February 2014, Lingard joined another Championship club, Brighton & Hove Albion, on a 93-day loan. He scored his first goal for the club on 8 April, in a 4–1 win against former club Leicester City, who had sealed promotion to the Premier League days earlier. While with Albion, Lingard played 17 times, including in the Championship play-offs, and scored 4 goals.

==== 2014–15 season ====
On 4 August 2014, Lingard came off the bench to score the third goal in United's 3–1 International Champions Cup Final win over Liverpool. He made his competitive debut for the club in the first match of the 2014–15 Premier League season at home to Swansea City, starting the match but was replaced by Adnan Januzaj because of injury after 24 minutes. Swansea won 2–1 in Louis van Gaal's first competitive match as United manager.

On 2 February 2015, Lingard joined Championship club Derby County on loan until the end of the season. He made his first start on 14 February, against Reading in the FA Cup.

==== 2015–16 season ====
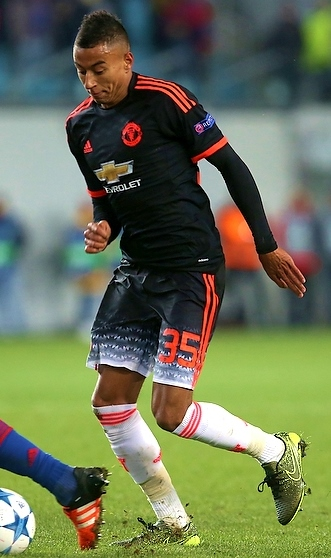
Lingard playing for Manchester United in 2015

On 7 November 2015, Lingard scored his first senior goal for Manchester United in a 2–0 win against West Bromwich Albion at Old Trafford, opening the scoring with a shot past Boaz Myhill from outside the penalty area. On 12 January 2016, he scored against Newcastle United in a 3–3 draw at St James' Park, with a finish that went between the legs of the goalkeeper after a reverse assist from Wayne Rooney. He added his third goal of the season on 2 February against Stoke City in a 3–0 victory with a closer range diving header from a cross by Cameron Borthwick-Jackson. On 7 February 2016, Lingard scored his fourth goal of the season in a 1–1 draw against Chelsea at Stamford Bridge, breaking the deadlock with a spin and shot inside the penalty area. On 21 May 2016, Lingard scored the winning goal for Manchester United in the 2016 FA Cup Final against Crystal Palace, having come on as a second-half substitute for other goalscorer Juan Mata.

==== 2016–17 season ====
Lingard scored the opening goal as Manchester United beat Premier League champions Leicester City 2–1 to win the 2016 FA Community Shield. He scored another important goal in February 2017, this time United's second of a 3–2 win over Southampton in the 2017 EFL Cup Final. On 6 April 2017, Lingard signed a new contract with Manchester United, of four years with an option for a fifth.

==== 2018–19 season ====
On 5 December 2018, Lingard scored his first domestic goal of the season in a 2–2 draw against Arsenal. Two weeks later, in the North West derby, Lingard scored his second of the season in a 3–1 loss to Liverpool. During United's first game under new interim manager Ole Gunnar Solskjær, Lingard doubled his season's tally, scoring a penalty and a goal from open play in United's 5–1 win over Cardiff City, in addition to an assist for Anthony Martial. On 25 January 2019, Lingard scored the second goal in a 3–1 win over Arsenal in the fourth round of the FA Cup.

==== 2019–20 season ====
On 26 July 2020, Lingard scored his first goal in the final matchday of Premier League; his first since December 2018 in the 98th minute to seal a 2–0 win at Leicester City. His goal secured qualification for the 2020–21 UEFA Champions League and was the final goal of the 2019–20 Premier League season.

==== 2020–21 season: Loan to West Ham United ====
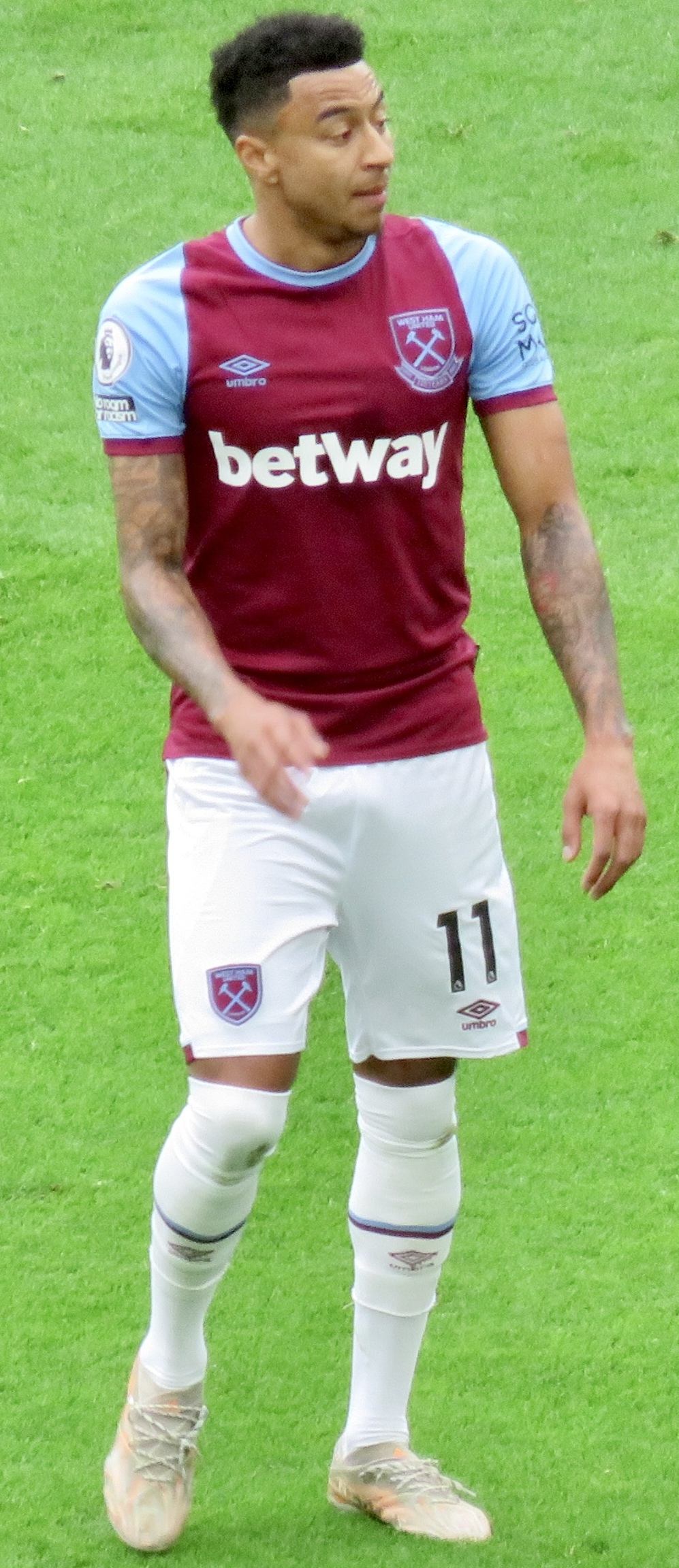
Lingard playing for West Ham United in 2021

On 29 January 2021, Lingard joined West Ham United on loan until the end of the season, where he reunited with former Manchester United boss David Moyes. On his debut on 3 February 2021, Lingard scored two goals against Aston Villa as West Ham won 3–1.

In a match against Wolves on 5 April, Lingard carried the ball 52 metres before firing past Rui Patrício, the furthest a player had travelled with the ball before scoring in the Premier League during the season. Lingard continued his good form during his loan spell, contributing nine goals and four assists in his first 10 Premier League games for West Ham. His ninth goal was scored from the penalty spot in the club's 2–3 defeat at Newcastle United on 17 April. The goal meant he had scored more Premier League goals for West Ham than he ever managed in a single season at Manchester United.

For his goal performances in April and for his goal against Wolves, Lingard won both the Premier League Player of the Month and the Premier League Goal of the Month. He played 16 games during his loan spell, scoring nine and assisting five goals.

==== 2021–22 season ====
On 11 September 2021, Lingard scored the fourth goal for Manchester United in a 4–1 win over Newcastle. On 19 September, Lingard scored an 89th minute winner in 2–1 defeat of West Ham.

On 1 June 2022, Manchester United announced that Lingard would leave the club following the expiration of his contract.

=== Nottingham Forest ===
On 21 July 2022, Lingard signed for newly promoted Premier League club Nottingham Forest on a one-year contract, becoming their highest-paid player for the 2022–23 season. Although he neither scored nor assisted a goal in his 17 league appearances, he made two assists and scored twice to help the team reach the EFL Cup semi-finals. Lingard and five other senior players were released when their contracts expired at the end of the season.

=== FC Seoul ===
On 7 February 2024, Lingard signed a two-year contract with South Korean K League club FC Seoul. The signing of Lingard by FC Seoul was described by South Korean football journalist Lee Sungmo as, "the biggest signing in the K League's history".

After a 2–0 victory against Jeju United FC on 16 March, Lingard was publicly criticised by FC Seoul's head coach, Kim Gi-dong, citing a lack of effort and physicality.

Lingard appeared for 105 minutes during FC Seoul's first six games of the season, before undergoing knee surgery.

Lingard scored his first goal for the club in a 2–0 home win against Gangwon FC on 26 June, kicking the ball into the corner from the penalty spot.

In January 2025, he was named club captain ahead of the 2025 season.

On 5 December 2025, Lingard and FC Seoul agreed to terminate his contract after two years. He made his final appearance for the club on 10 December, scoring in a 1–1 draw against Melbourne City in the league stage of the AFC Champions League Elite.

=== Corinthians ===
On 6 March 2026, Lingard signed a one-year contract with Brazilian club Corinthians. On 21 April 2026, he became the first British player to score a goal in the Copa do Brasil, securing a 1–0 away win over Barra in the fifth round. Later that month, on 30 April, he netted his first Copa Libertadores goal in a 2–0 victory over Peñarol in the group stage.

== International career ==
=== Youth ===
Lingard played three times for England at under-17 level in the 2008 Nordic Tournament. He received his first call-up for the under-21 team for the friendly match against Scotland under-21s on 13 August 2013, and made his debut as a second-half substitute for Nathan Redmond as England won 6–0. On 21 June 2015, Lingard came off the bench to score the winner in a 2015 UEFA European Under-21 Championship group match against Sweden.

=== Senior ===
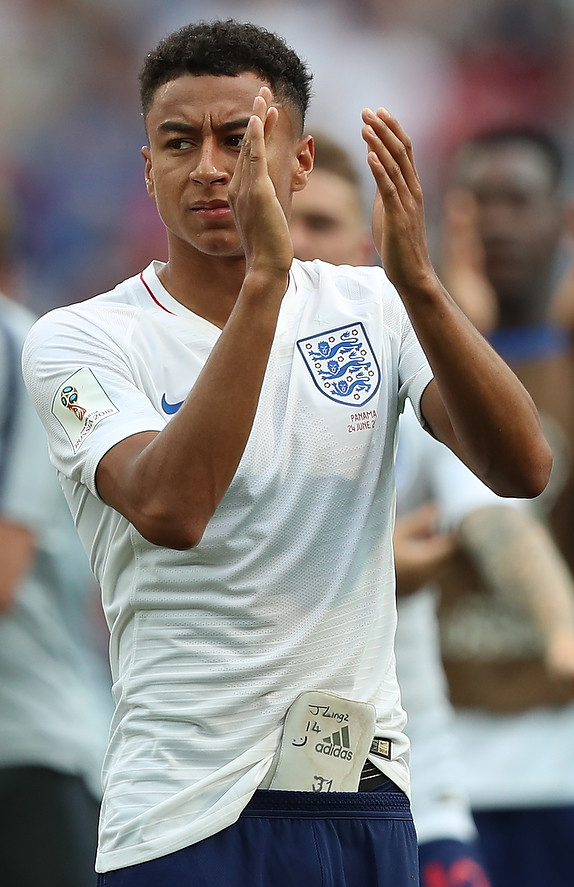
Lingard playing for England at the 2018 FIFA World Cup

After Michael Carrick and Jamie Vardy withdrew through injury, Lingard received his first call-up to the full England squad, for a friendly against France on 17 November 2015. He did not appear in the match.

Lingard received his next call-up for 2018 FIFA World Cup qualifiers against Malta and Slovenia in October 2016. He made his debut against Malta, starting on the left wing as England won 2–0. Lingard scored his first goal on 23 March 2018, in a 1–0 win over the Netherlands in a friendly.

In May 2018, Lingard was named in the 23-man England squad for the 2018 World Cup. On 24 June, Lingard scored his first World Cup goal in a 6–1 victory over Panama during their second group stage match. During the tournament, Lingard received five starts, plus a substitute appearance in the third place play off against Belgium which saw England finish fourth in the tournament.

During the November international break, Lingard scored the first goal in Wayne Rooney's farewell match against the USA on 15 November. On the following Sunday, Lingard scored the equaliser in 2–1 win over Croatia which put England top of their group and qualified them for the UEFA Nations League semi-finals to be held in June 2019.

Lingard was left out of the England squad for UEFA Euro 2020 qualifying matches in October 2019. His performances while on loan with West Ham United, since January 2021, earned Lingard a recall to the England squad in March 2021. In May 2021, he was named in the provisional England squad for Euro 2020, but was omitted from the final squad and instead named as a stand-by player for the tournament.

During the September 2021 international break, Lingard scored two goals in a 2022 World Cup qualification match against Andorra, an eventual 4–0 win.

== Personal life ==
Lingard was born in England, and his paternal grandparents are emigrants from Saint Vincent and the Grenadines. He is a cousin of Manchester United and England women's international footballer Gabby George.

His parents separated when Lingard was very young, and his grandfather would take him to training and was his biggest supporter. He lived partially with his grandparents and also with his mother, as she suffered with depression, and struggled to get out of bed. Due to his mother suffering from mental health issues, Lingard needed to care for his younger siblings, Jasper, and Daisy-Boo.

Lingard has a daughter from a relationship with fitness model and former girlfriend Rebecca Halliday.

In 2018, Lingard launched his own clothing brand, JLingz. The company was criticised by Manchester United former players Roy Keane and Gary Neville as being a distraction from football. It recorded losses of over £200,000 in its first year of trading.

In September 2023, Lingard was banned from driving for 18 months and fined £57,000, a week's wages, having been found guilty of drink driving. Lingard was stopped in Sale, Greater Manchester, driving a Lamborghini Urus and was found to be more than twice over the drink driving limit for micrograms of alcohol in a breath sample given.

== Career statistics ==
=== Club ===
As of match played 18 November 2026

Appearances and goals by club, season and competition
Club	Season	League			National cup (Note: Includes FA Cup, Korea Cup, Copa do Brasil)		League cup (Note: Includes Football League/EFL Cup)		Continental		Other		Total	
Club	Season	Division	Apps	Goals	Apps	Goals	Apps	Goals	Apps	Goals	Apps	Goals	Apps	Goals
Manchester United	2011–12	Premier League	0	0	0	0	0	0	0	0	0	0	0	0
Manchester United	2012–13	Premier League	0	0	0	0	0	0	0	0	—		0	0
Manchester United	2013–14	Premier League	0	0	0	0	0	0	0	0	0	0	0	0
Manchester United	2014–15	Premier League	1	0	0	0	0	0	—		—		1	0
Manchester United	2015–16	Premier League	25	4	7	2	1	0	7 (Note: Four appearances in UEFA Champions League, three appearances in UEFA Europa League)	0	—		40	6
Manchester United	2016–17	Premier League	25	1	2	0	4	1	10 (Note: Appearances in UEFA Europa League)	2	1 (Note: Appearance in FA Community Shield)	1	42	5
Manchester United	2017–18	Premier League	33	8	6	2	2	3	6 (Note: Appearances in UEFA Champions League)	0	1 (Note: Appearance in UEFA Super Cup)	0	48	13
Manchester United	2018–19	Premier League	27	4	2	1	1	0	6	0	—		36	5
Manchester United	2019–20	Premier League	22	1	4	1	5	0	9	2	—		40	4
Manchester United	2020–21	Premier League	0	0	1	0	2	0	0	0	—		3	0
Manchester United	2021–22	Premier League	16	2	1	0	1	0	4	0	—		22	2
Manchester United	Total		149	20	23	6	16	4	42	4	2	1	232	35
Leicester City (loan)	2012–13	Championship	5	0	—		—		—		—		5	0
Birmingham City (loan)	2013–14	Championship	13	6	—		0	0	—		—		13	6
Brighton & Hove Albion (loan)	2013–14	Championship	15	3	—		—		—		2 (Note: Appearances in Championship play-offs)	1	17	4
Derby County (loan)	2014–15	Championship	14	2	1	0	—		—		—		15	2
West Ham United (loan)	2020–21	Premier League	16	9	—		—		—		—		16	9
Nottingham Forest	2022–23	Premier League	17	0	0	0	3	2	—		—		20	2
FC Seoul	2024	K League 1	26	6	0	0	—		—		—		26	6
FC Seoul	2025	K League 1	34	10	1	0	—		6 (Note: Appearances in AFC Champions League Elite)	3	—		41	13
FC Seoul	Total		60	16	1	0	—		6	3	—		67	19
Corinthians	2026	Série A	20	0	4	1	—		8 (Note: Appearances in Copa Libertadores)	1	—		32	2
Career total			309	56	29	7	19	6	56	8	4	2	417	79

=== International ===
Appearances and goals by national team and year
National team	Year	Apps	Goals
England	2016	3	0
England	2017	5	0
England	2018	14	4
England	2019	2	0
England	2021	8	2
Total		32	6

England score listed first, score column indicates score after each Lingard goal

List of international goals scored by Jesse Lingard
No.	Date	Venue	Cap	Opponent	Score	Result	Competition	Ref.
1	23 March 2018	Amsterdam Arena, Amsterdam, Netherlands	9	Netherlands	1–0	1–0	Friendly	
2	24 June 2018	Nizhny Novgorod Stadium, Nizhny Novgorod, Russia	14	Panama	3–0	6–1	2018 FIFA World Cup	
3	15 November 2018	Wembley Stadium, London, England	21	United States	1–0	3–0	Friendly	
4	18 November 2018	Wembley Stadium, London, England	22	Croatia	1–1	2–1	2018–19 UEFA Nations League A	
5	5 September 2021	Wembley Stadium, London, England	31	Andorra	1–0	4–0	2022 FIFA World Cup qualification	
6	5 September 2021	Wembley Stadium, London, England	31	Andorra	3–0	4–0	2022 FIFA World Cup qualification	

== Honours ==
Manchester United Academy

- FA Youth Cup: 2010–11

Manchester United

- FA Cup: 2015–16; runner-up: 2017–18
- EFL Cup: 2016–17
- FA Community Shield: 2016
- UEFA Europa League: 2016–17

England

- UEFA Nations League third place: 2018–19

Individual

- Premier League Player of the Month: April 2021
- Premier League Goal of the Month: April 2021
- K League Player of the Month: July 2025
- FC Seoul Player of the Year: 2025
