= Hwang Do-yun =

South Korean footballer (born 2003)

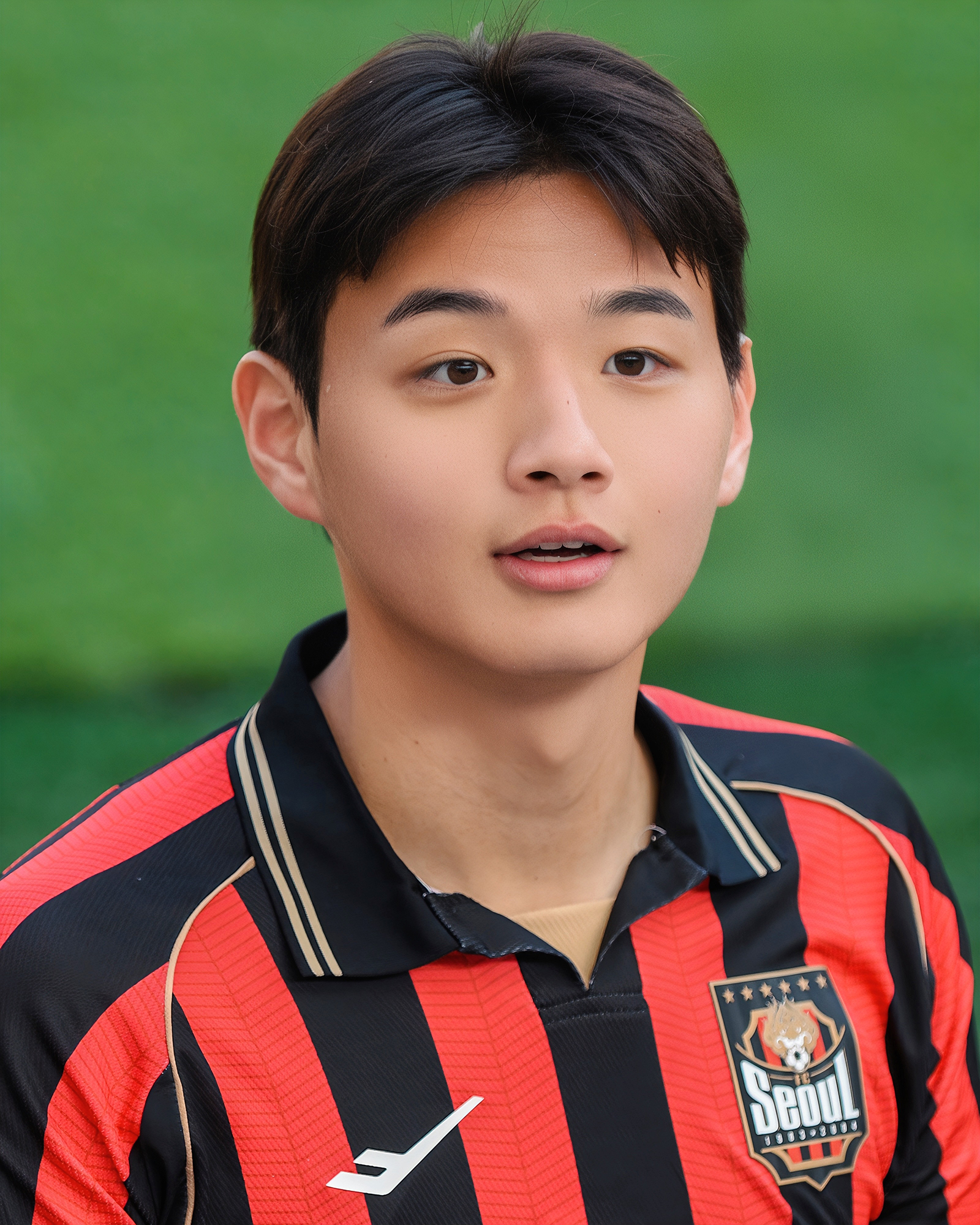
- Hwang in 2026

Personal information
- Date of birth: April 9, 2003 (age 23)
- Place of birth: South Korea
- Height: 1.76 m (5 ft 9 in)
- Position: Central midfielder

Team information
- Current team: FC Seoul
- Number: 41

Youth career
- 2017–2019: Osan Middle School (youth)
- 2019–2021: Osan High School (youth)
- 2022: Korea University

Senior career*
Years	Team	Apps	(Gls)
2023–	FC Seoul	61	(2)

International career^{‡}
2022	South Korea U20	5	(0)
2025–	South Korea U23	14	(2)
Medal record
Men's football
Representing South Korea
Asian Games
Gold medal – first place	2026 Aichi–Nagoya
- * Club domestic league appearances and goals as of November 1, 2026 ‡ National team caps and goals as of October 3, 2026

- Hwang Do-yun
- Hangul: 황도윤
- Hanja: 黃度尹
- RR: Hwang Doyun
- MR: Hwang Toyun

Hwang Do-yun (Korean: 황도윤; born April 9, 2003) is a South Korean professional footballer who plays as a central midfielder for K League 1 club FC Seoul. He trained in the club's youth system before making his debut appearance in the 2023 K League 1 season.

== Early life and youth career ==
Hwang Do-yun was born on April 9, 2003. He attended Seoul Sinjeong Elementary School, where he played football and was designated the captain of the squad. The team won the championship at the 2015 National Elementary School Football League, with Hwang receiving the Most Valuable Player (MVP) Award. He enrolled at Osan Middle School and joined the FC Seoul U-15 Team. During the inaugural K League Youth Championship in 2018, he scored a goal and contributed to a 2–1 victory against Pohang Steelers U-15, earning the MVP title for that match. As a member of Osan High School's youth team, Hwang was regarded as a key player in the midfield. He later attended Korea University.

== Senior career ==
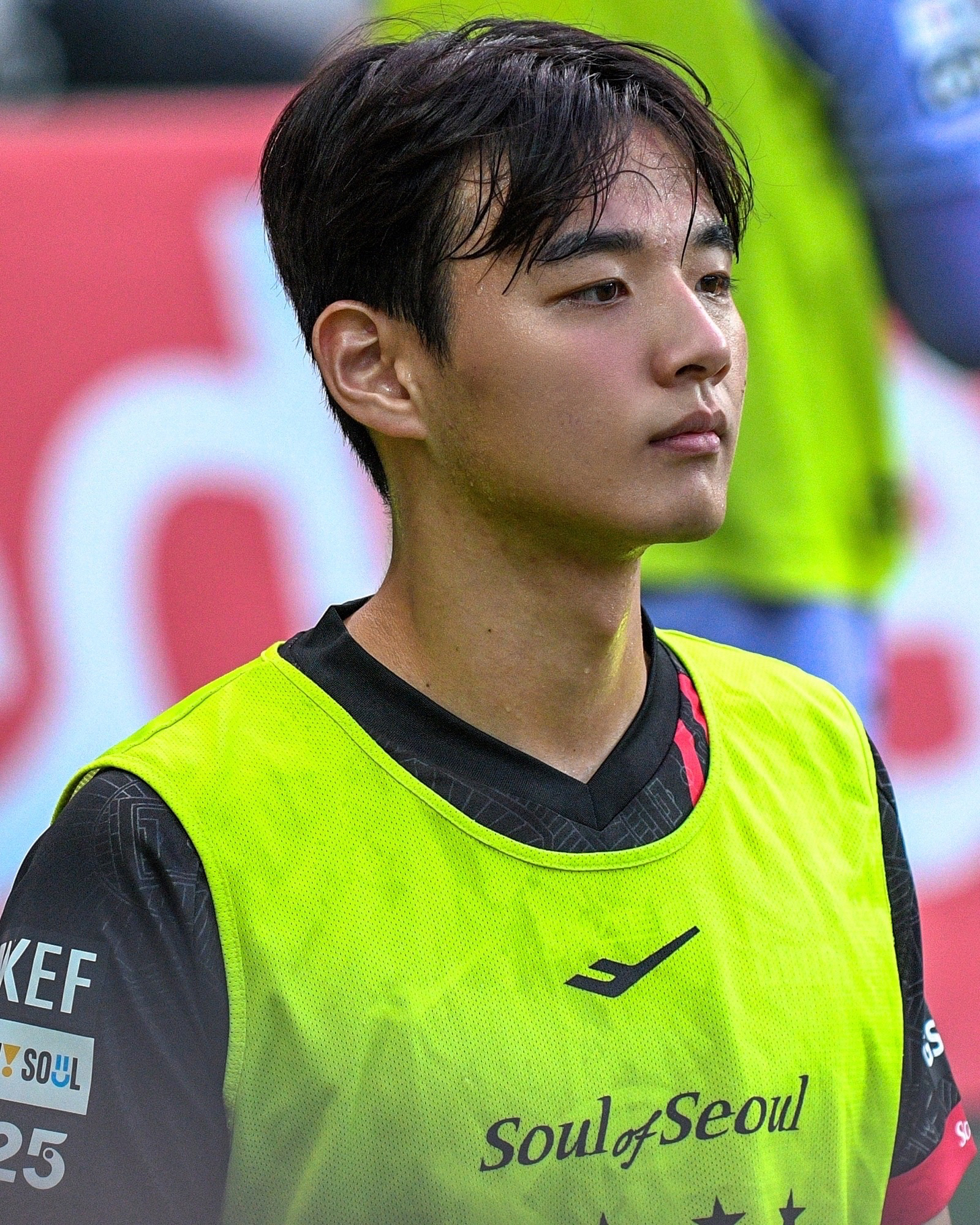
Hwang in 2024

Hwang signed with K League 1 club FC Seoul in late 2022. He made his professional debut appearance in the 2023 K League 1 season in a match against Daejeon Hana Citizen on December 2, which was his sole appearance that year. Beginning in April 2024, Hwang became a regular fixture in the squad until he sustained a stress fracture in May, preventing him from playing for several months. Upon his return that October, he was consistently included in the starting lineup and played nine games by the end of the season.

In the 2025 K League 1 season, Hwang was established as a regular starter and a central figure in the squad's midfield. By the end of July, the team ranked fourth among twelve squads; Hwang was credited in part for its upward trajectory. He was named the Korea Football Association's Young Player of the Month for July. Hwang was also selected as FC Seoul's sole representative for Team K League in the K League All-Star Game exhibition match against Newcastle United. In August, Hwang scored his first league goal, aiding his team to a 3–2 victory against Ulsan HD.

== Style of play ==
Hwang plays as a central midfielder. Kim Hwan of Xports News observed the impact Hwang's presence has on his teammates, from providing support and reducing the workload for defense, while creating opportunities for offense by dribbling forward and making bold passes.

Hwang has cited Ki Sung-yueng as his role model, expressing the desire to emulate his style of play. He has also named Yaya Touré, Andrés Iniesta, and İlkay Gündoğan as aspirations.

== Career statistics ==
As of match played November 1, 2026

Appearances and goals by club, season and competition
Club	Season	League			Korea Cup		Continental		Other		Total	
Club	Season	Division	Apps	Goals	Apps	Goals	Apps	Goals	Apps	Goals	Apps	Goals
FC Seoul	2023	K League 1	1	0	0	0	—		0	0	1	0
FC Seoul	2024	K League 1	9	0	1	0	—		0	0	10	0
FC Seoul	2025	K League 1	34	1	2	0	6 (Note: Appearances in AFC Champions League Elite)	0	0	0	42	1
FC Seoul	2026	K League 1	17	1	1	0	3 (Note: Two appearances in AFC Champions League Elite, one appearance one goal in AFC Champions League Two)	1	0	0	21	2
Career total			61	2	4	0	9	1	0	0	74	3

== Honours ==
FC Seoul

- K League 1: 2026

South Korea U23

- Asian Games: 2026
