= Yazan Al-Arab =

Jordanian footballer (born 1996)

- Al-Arab with FC Seoul in 2026

Personal information
- Full name: Yazan Mousa Mahmoud Abu Al-Arab
- Date of birth: 31 January 1996 (age 30)
- Place of birth: Russeifa, Jordan
- Height: 1.88 m (6 ft 2 in)
- Position: Centre-back

Team information
- Current team: FC Seoul
- Number: 5

Youth career
- 2015: Al-Jazeera

Senior career*
Years	Team	Apps	(Gls)
2015–2019	Al-Jazeera	19	(1)
2019–2021	Al-Wehdat	5	(0)
2022–2023	Selangor	35	(3)
2023–2024	Al-Shorta	7	(0)
2024	Muaither	8	(0)
2024–	FC Seoul	74	(2)

International career^{‡}
2015–2018	Jordan U23	7	(0)
2017–	Jordan	84	(3)
Medal record
Representing Jordan
Men's football
AFC Asian Cup
Runner-up	2023 Qatar	Team
- * Club domestic league appearances and goals as of 11:29, 18 October 2026 (UTC) ‡ National team caps and goals as of 11:29, 18 October 2026 (UTC)

Yazan Mousa Mahmoud Abu Al-Arab (Arabic: يَزَن مُوسَى مَحْمُود أَبُو الْعَرَب; born 31 January 1996) is a Jordanian professional footballer who plays as a centre-back for K League 1 club FC Seoul and the Jordan national team.

== Club career ==
=== Selangor ===
On 18 December 2021, Yazan officially signed up with Malaysia Super League club, Selangor alongside national teammate Baha' Abdel-Rahman for 2022 season.

On 3 October 2023, his contract was officially terminated by Selangor FC following an on-field incident involving a match official in a Malaysia Cup match against Terengganu FC on 24 September 2023.

On 20 November 2023, Yazan has been banned for life from Malaysian football. The Football Association of Malaysia gave a lifetime ban because he violated Article 51, paragraph 1(a) and Article 59 of the association's Disciplinary Code but said the decision could be appealed.

=== FC Seoul ===
In July 2024, Yazan signed with FC Seoul. He was named as a candidate for K League's Player of the Month award for the month of August in 2024, making an immediate impression for the club. In July 2025 Yazan scored against Spanish giant FC Barcelona during a friendly match.

== International career ==
On 5 September 2017, in a 2018 FIFA World Cup qualification match against the Afghanistan national team, Al-Arab made his debut for the Jordan national team. On 7 June 2021, he scored his first goal for the national team in a 2023 AFC Asian Cup qualification match against the Nepal national team.

In 2019, he was included in Jordan's squad for the 2019 AFC Asian Cup. He remained an unused substitute throughout the tournament and did not make any appearances.

In 2021, he participated in the 2021 FIFA Arab Cup. He was a regular starter and appeared in three matches during the tournament.

In 2024, he participated in the 2023 AFC Asian Cup for the second time. He was a key player for Jordan and appeared in six matches. In the round of 16 match against the Iraq national team, he scored a goal that helped Jordan win the match and advance to the quarter-finals. He featured in all of Jordan's knockout-stage matches, including the final against the Qatar national team, in which Jordan lost 3–1. At the conclusion of the tournament, he was named to one of the teams of the tournament.

On 17 May 2026, Al-Arab was named in Jordan's 30-men preliminary squad for the 2026 FIFA World Cup.

== Career statistics ==
=== Club ===
As of match played 17 October 2026

Appearances and goals by club, season and competition
Club	Season	League			National cup (Note: Includes Malaysia FA Cup, Korea Cup)		Continental		Other		Total	
Club	Season	Division	Apps	Goals	Apps	Goals	Apps	Goals	Apps	Goals	Apps	Goals
Al-Jazeera	2015–16	Jordanian Pro League	?	?	?	?	—		—		?	?
Al-Jazeera	2016–17	Jordanian Pro League	?	?	?	?	—		—		?	?
Al-Jazeera	2017–18	Jordanian Pro League	?	?	?	?	5 (Note: Appearances in AFC Champions League Two)	1	—		5	1
Al-Jazeera	2018–19	Jordanian Pro League	?	?	?	?	9	0	—		9	0
Al-Jazeera	Total		?	?	?	?	14	1	—		14	1
Al-Wehdat	2020	Jordanian Pro League	?	?	?	?	—		—		?	?
Al-Wehdat	2021	Jordanian Pro League	?	?	?	?	5 (Note: Appearances in AFC Champions League Elite)	0	—		5	0
Al-Wehdat	Total		?	?	?	?	5	0	—		5	0
Selangor	2022	Malaysia Super League	19	2	2	0	—		2 (Note: Appearance(s) in Malaysia Cup)	1	23	3
Selangor	2023	Malaysia Super League	16	1	2	0	—		1	0	19	1
Selangor	Total		35	3	4	0	—		3	1	42	4
Al Shorta	2023–24	Iraq Stars League	7	0	0	0	—		—		7	0
Muaither	2023–24	Qatar Stars League	8	0	0	0	—		—		8	0
FC Seoul	2024	K League 1	12	0	0	0	—		—		12	0
FC Seoul	2025	K League 1	34	1	2	0	5	0	—		41	1
FC Seoul	2026	K League 1	28	1	0	0	—		—		28	1
FC Seoul	Total		74	2	2	0	5	0	—		81	2
Career total (Note: Information regarding Al-Arab's appearances in Jordanian Pro League is scarce.)			124	5	6	0	24	1	3	1	157	7

=== International ===
As of match played 27 September 2026

Appearances and goals by national team and year
National team	Year	Apps	Goals
Jordan	2017	6	0
Jordan	2018	6	0
Jordan	2019	6	0
Jordan	2020	2	0
Jordan	2021	17	1
Jordan	2022	8	0
Jordan	2023	5	0
Jordan	2024	18	1
Jordan	2025	8	1
Jordan	2026	8	0
Total		84	3

Scores and results list Jordan's goal tally first, score column indicates score after each Al-Arab goal.

List of international goals scored by Yazan Al-Arab
No.	Date	Venue	Opponent	Score	Result	Competition
1	7 June 2021	Jaber Al-Ahmad International Stadium, Kuwait City, Kuwait	Nepal	3–0	3–0	2022 FIFA World Cup qualification
2	29 January 2024	Khalifa International Stadium, Al Rayyan, Qatar	Iraq	2–2	3–2	2023 AFC Asian Cup
3	20 March 2025	Amman International Stadium, Amman, Jordan	Palestine	1–0	3–1	2026 FIFA World Cup qualification

== Honours ==
Al-Shorta

- Iraq Stars League: 2023–24

FC Seoul

- K League 1: 2026

Jordan

- AFC Asian Cup runner-up: 2023

Individual

- AFC Asian Cup Team of the Tournament: 2023
- K League 1 Best XI: 2025
- K League All-Star: 2026
