= Cheon Seong-hoon =

South Korean footballer

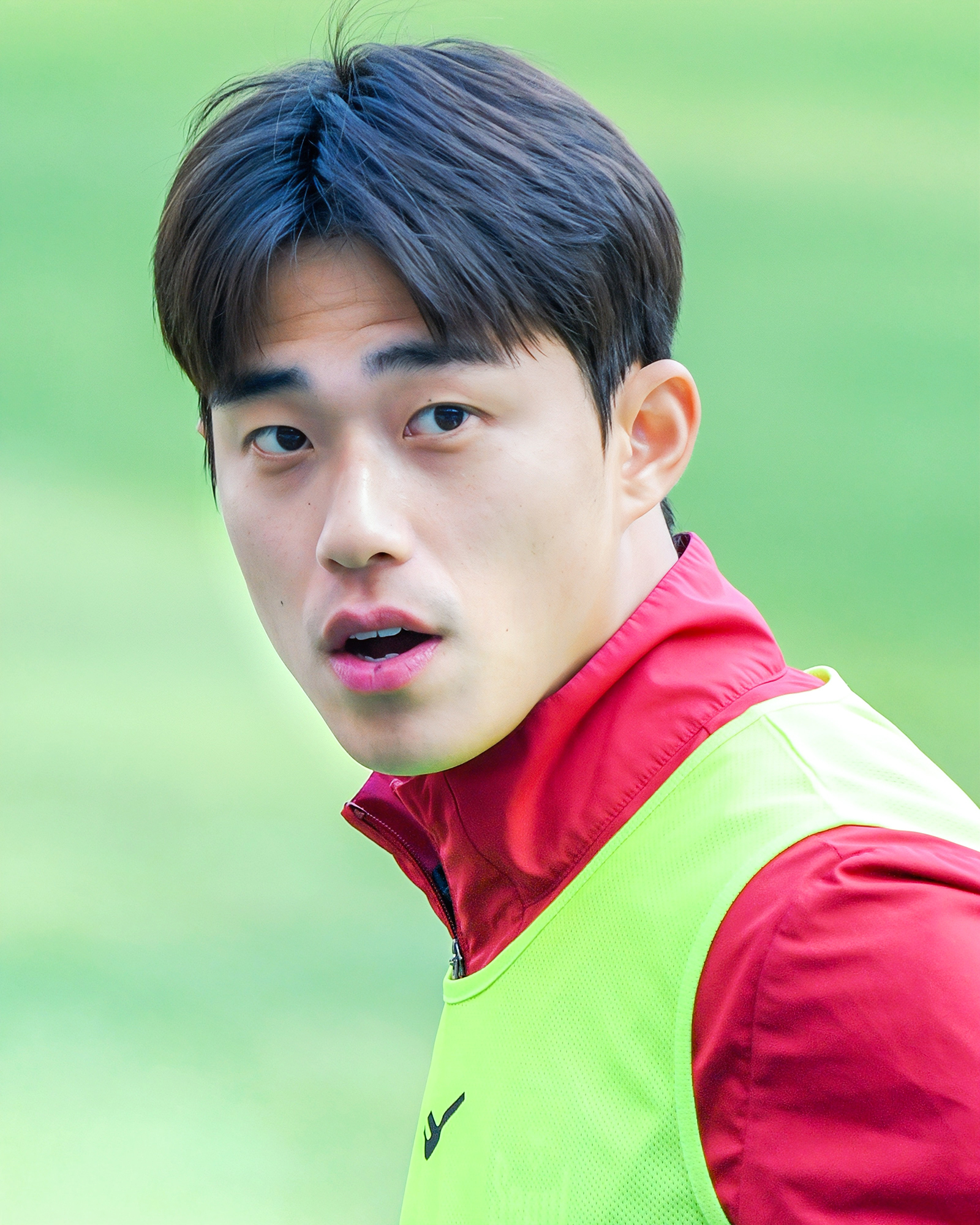
- Cheon in 2026

Personal information
- Date of birth: 21 September 2000 (age 26)
- Place of birth: Gwangmyeong, South Korea
- Height: 1.91 m (6 ft 3 in)
- Position: Forward

Team information
- Current team: FC Seoul
- Number: 19

Youth career
- 2007–2012: Gwangmyeong Gwangdeok Elementary School
- 2013–2015: Kwangsung Middle School
- 2016–2018: Incheon Daegun High School

Senior career*
Years	Team	Apps	(Gls)
2019–2022	FC Augsburg	0	(0)
2019–2022	FC Augsburg II	33	(5)
2021–2022	→ FC Homburg (loan)	25	(1)
2023–2024	Incheon United	28	(6)
2024–2025	Daejeon Hana Citizen	12	(2)
2024	Daejeon Hana Citizen B	1	(0)
2025–	FC Seoul	13	(1)

International career
2013	South Korea U14	3	(4)
2015–2016	South Korea U17	14	(2)
2020–2023	South Korea U23	2	(0)
- * Club domestic league appearances and goals as of 14:38, 25 October 2026 (UTC)

Cheon Seong-hoon (Korean: 천성훈; born 21 September 2000) is a South Korean professional footballer who plays as a forward for K League 1 club FC Seoul.

== Career statistics ==
As of match played 14 October 2026

Appearances and goals by club, season and competition
Club	Season	League			National cup (Note: Includes Korean FA Cup)		Continental		Other		Total	
Club	Season	Division	Apps	Goals	Apps	Goals	Apps	Goals	Apps	Goals	Apps	Goals
FC Augsburg II	2018–19	Regionalliga Bayern	3	0	—		—		—		3	0
FC Augsburg II	2019–20	Regionalliga Bayern	14	4	—		—		—		14	4
FC Augsburg II	2021–22	Regionalliga Bayern	8	0	—		—		—		8	0
FC Augsburg II	2022–23	Regionalliga Bayern	8	1	—		—		—		8	1
FC Augsburg II	Total		33	5	—		—		—		33	5
FC Homburg (loan)	2021–22	Regionalliga Südwest	25	1	—		—		4 (Note: Appearances in Saarland Cup)	0	29	1
Incheon United	2023	K League 1	18	6	1	2	5 (Note: Appearances in AFC Champions League Elite)	1	—		24	9
Incheon United	2024	K League 1	10	0	1	1	—		—		11	1
Incheon United	Total		28	6	2	3	5	1	—		35	10
Daejeon Hana Citizen	2024	K League 1	12	2	—		—		—		12	2
Daejeon Hana Citizen B	2024	K4 League	1	0	—		—		—		1	0
FC Seoul	2025	K League 1	9	1	—		6	0	—		15	1
FC Seoul	2026	K League 1	4	0	0	0	2 (Note: Appearances in AFC Champions League Two)	0	—		6	0
FC Seoul	Total		13	1	0	0	8	0	—		21	1
Career total			112	15	2	3	13	1	4	0	131	19

== Honours ==
FC Seoul

- K League 1: 2026
