= Bae Hyun-seo =

South Korean footballer (born 2005)

Personal information
- Date of birth: 16 February 2005 (age 21)
- Place of birth: Seoul, South Korea
- Height: 1.72 m (5 ft 8 in)
- Position: Left back

Team information
- Current team: Gyeongnam FC (on loan from FC Seoul)
- Number: 2

Youth career
- 2018–2020: Osan Middle School (youth)
- 2021–2023: Osan High School (youth)

Senior career*
Years	Team	Apps	(Gls)
2024–	FC Seoul	0	(0)
2026–	→ Gyeongnam FC (loan)	21	(1)

International career^{‡}
2018–2019	South Korea U14	6	(3)
2024–2025	South Korea U20	14	(0)
2025–	South Korea U23	12	(0)
Medal record
Men's football
Representing South Korea
Asian Games
Gold medal – first place	2026 Aichi–Nagoya
Korean name
Hangul	배현서
RR	Bae Hyeonseo
MR	Pae Hyŏnsŏ
- * Club domestic league appearances and goals as of 17 October 2026 ‡ National team caps and goals as of 3 October 2026

Bae Hyun-seo (Korean: 배현서; born 16 February 2005) is a South Korean professional footballer who plays as a Left back for K League 2 club Gyeongnam FC, on loan from K League 1 club FC Seoul.

== Club career ==
In January 2024, Bae Hyun-seo joined FC Seoul.

In January 2026, he was loaned to Gyeongnam FC.

== Career statistics ==
As of match played 17 October 2026

Appearances and goals by club, season and competition
Club	Season	League			Korea Cup		Continental		Other		Total	
Club	Season	Division	Apps	Goals	Apps	Goals	Apps	Goals	Apps	Goals	Apps	Goals
FC Seoul	2024	K League 1	0	0	0	0	—		—		0	0
FC Seoul	2025	K League 1	0	0	1	0	—		—		1	0
FC Seoul	Total		0	0	1	0	—		—		1	0
Gyeongnam FC (loan)	2026	K League 2	21	1	1	0	—		—		22	1
Career total			21	1	2	0	0	0	0	0	23	1

== Honours ==
South Korea U23

- Asian Games: 2026
