= Yun Ki-wook =

South Korean footballer (born 2006)

Personal information
- Date of birth: October 10, 2006 (age 20)
- Place of birth: Seoul, South Korea
- Height: 1.90 m (6 ft 3 in)
- Position: Goalkeeper

Team information
- Current team: FC Seoul
- Number: 71

Senior career*
| Years | Team | Apps | (Gls) |
| 2025– | FC Seoul | 0 | (0) |

International career^{‡}
| 2019 | South Korea U14 | 2 | (0) |
| 2022–2023 | South Korea U17 | 6 | (0) |
| 2024– | South Korea U20 | 3 | (0) |
Korean name
| Hangul | 윤기욱 |
| RR | Yun Giuk |
| MR | Yun Kiuk |
- * Club domestic league appearances and goals as of 23:25, 24 October 2026 (UTC) ‡ National team caps and goals as of 25 August 2026

Yun Ki-wook (Korean: 윤기욱; born October 10, 2006) is a South Korean professional footballer who plays as a goalkeeper for K League 1 club FC Seoul.

== Club career ==
In 2025, Yun Ki-wook signed a professional contract with FC Seoul.

== International career ==
Yun Ki-wook was consistently selected for youth national teams starting from U-14 and gained experience when he was called up to the U-21 Olympic national team around March 2026.
