= Lee Si-young (footballer) =

South Korean footballer

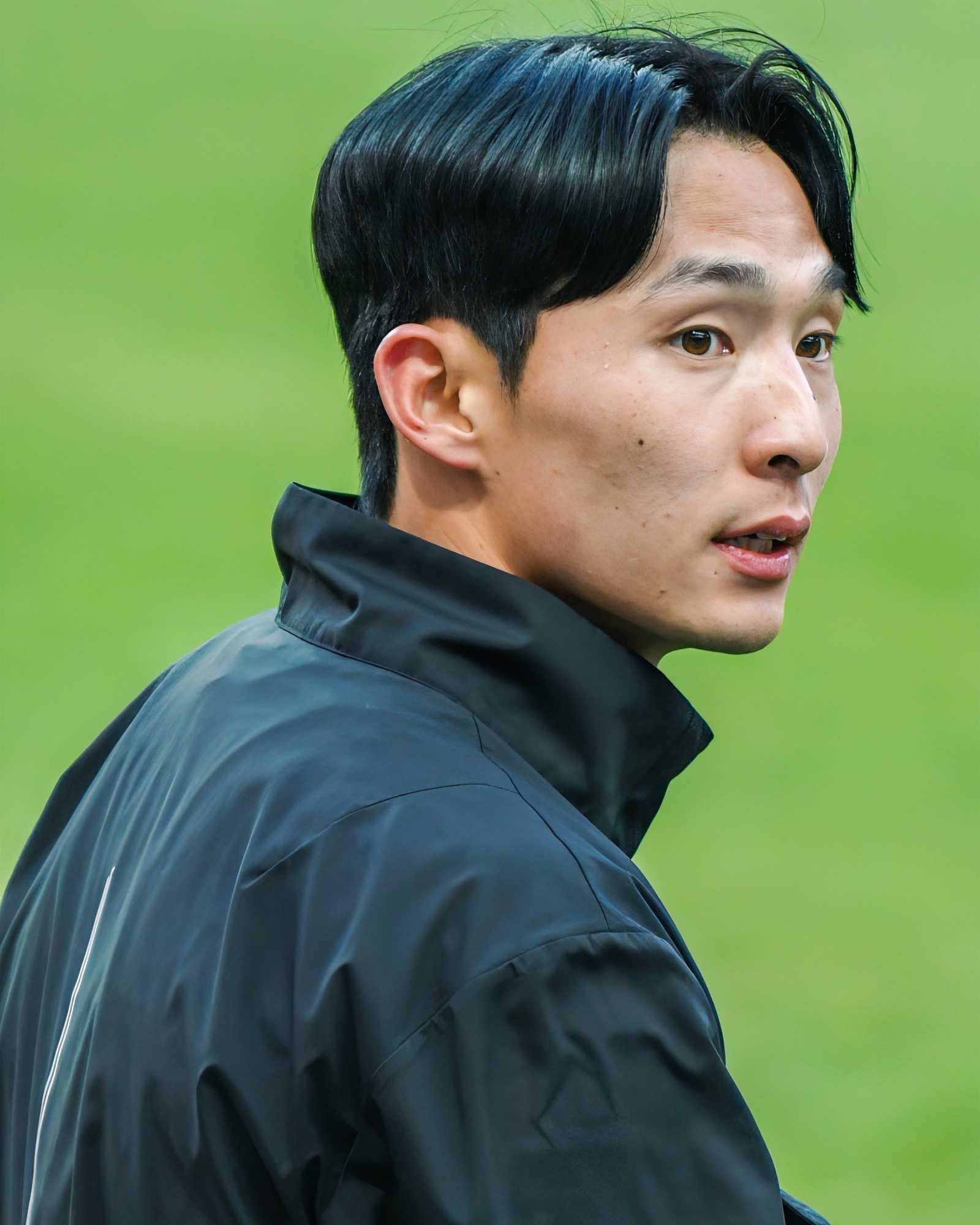
- Lee in 2025

Personal information
- Date of birth: 21 April 1997 (age 29)
- Place of birth: South Korea
- Height: 1.73 m (5 ft 8 in)
- Position: Defender

Team information
- Current team: Suwon FC
- Number: 27

Youth career
- 2016–2017: Jeonju University

Senior career*
Years	Team	Apps	(Gls)
2018	Seongnam	4	(0)
2019	→ Gwangju (loan)	13	(0)
2020	Seoul E-Land	11	(0)
2021–2022	Seongnam FC	51	(0)
2023–2025	FC Seoul	16	(0)
2024	→ Suwon Samsung Bluewings (loan)	31	(1)
2025–	Suwon FC	34	(0)

International career^{‡}
2018	South Korea U23	3	(0)
Medal record
Men's football
Representing South Korea
Asian Games
Gold medal – first place	2018 Jakarta-Palembang	Team
- * Club domestic league appearances and goals as of 5 August 2026 ‡ National team caps and goals as of 21 November 2018

- Lee Si-young
- Hangul: 이시영
- Hanja: 李是英
- RR: I Siyeong
- MR: I Siyŏng

Lee Si-young (Korean: 이시영; born 21 April 1997) is a South Korean footballer currently playing as a defender for Suwon FC.

== Club career ==
On 22 December 2022, Lee Si-young joined FC Seoul.

== Career statistics ==
=== Club ===
As of 20 August 2018.

Appearances and goals by club, season and competition
Club	Season	League			National cup		Continental		Other		Total	
Club	Season	Division	Apps	Goals	Apps	Goals	Apps	Goals	Apps	Goals	Apps	Goals
Seongnam FC	2018	K League 2	4	0	0	0	—		0	0	4	0
Career total			4	0	0	0	0	0	0	0	4	0
