= Kang Ju-hyeok =

South Korean footballer (born 2006)

- Kang in 2026

Personal information
- Date of birth: August 27, 2006 (age 20)
- Place of birth: Seoul, South Korea
- Height: 1.73 m (5 ft 8 in)
- Positions: Forward; midfielder

Team information
- Current team: Gimcheon Sangmu (draft)
- Number: 50

Youth career
- 2015–2016: Anyang AFA
- 2017–2018: Sinjeong
- 2019–2021: Osan Middle School (youth)
- 2022–2024: Osan High School (youth)

Senior career*
| Years | Team | Apps | (Gls) |
| 2024– | FC Seoul | 13 | (1) |
| 2025– | → Gimcheon Sangmu (draft) | 2 | (0) |

International career
| 2019 | South Korea U-14 | 2 | (1) |
| 2022–2023 | South Korea U-17 | 7 | (11) |
| 2024– | South Korea U-20 | 3 | (0) |
Korean name
| Hangul | 강주혁 |
| RR | Gang Juhyeok |
| MR | Kang Chuhyŏk |
- * Club domestic league appearances and goals as of October 25, 2026

Kang Ju-hyeok (Korean: 강주혁; born August 27, 2006) is a South Korean professional footballer who plays as a forward for Gimcheon Sangmu, drafted from K League 1 club FC Seoul. He made his debut professional appearance in the 2024 K League 1 season.

== Life and career ==
=== Early life and youth career ===
Kang Ju-hyeok was born on August 27, 2006, in Seoul. His parents are both former track and field runners and his older brother is footballer Kang Se-hyuk. Influenced by his sibling, he began playing football as a hobby in Anyang, Gyeonggi, before being scouted by Sinjeong Elementary School. Kang played in the selection match to qualify for the 2018 Volkswagen Junior World Masters tournament, where he was bestowed a trophy for being the top scorer. In 2019, he was a recipient of Best Eleven Award at the 31st Cha Bum-keun Football Awards.

Kang enrolled at Osan Middle School and played for the Seoul U-15s. At the 2023 Futures Star Awards, he was given the Star Award. Kang is attending Osan High School and plays for the Seoul U-18s. He is credited in part for leading the team to victory at the 2022 K League U-18 Championship.

=== Senior career ===
Kang signed with FC Seoul for the 2024 K League 1 season as the second semi-professional footballer in the club's history following Kang Seong-jin. He made his first appearance as a substitute; at seventeen years, nine months and six days old, he became the youngest player to debut with FC Seoul and the third youngest in K League history. Kang scored his debut league goal in FC Seoul's match against Incheon United in July. He became the second 17-year-old to score that year after Yang Min-hyeok.

Kang enlisted in the military football team Gimcheon Sangmu in November 2025 to fulfill his mandatory military service.

== International career ==
Kang played for the South Korea U-17 football team, where he scored eleven goals in seven matches. He was also selected to represent the U-20 national team.

== Style of play ==
Kang plays as a forward for FC Seoul. For the national team, he has been utilized as a winger. A judge of the Futures Star Awards highlighted Kang's "exceptional" physical energy and felt that he excels among others in his age group. Kang cites Marcus Rashford as his role model.

== Career statistics ==
As of match played October 24, 2026

Appearances and goals by club, season and competition
| Club | Season | League | | | Korea Cup | | Continental | | Other | | Total | |
| Club | Season | Division | Apps | Goals | Apps | Goals | Apps | Goals | Apps | Goals | Apps | Goals |
|---|---|---|---|---|---|---|---|---|---|---|---|---|
| FC Seoul | 2024 | K League 1 | 10 | 1 | 1 | 0 | — | | — | | 11 | 1 |
| FC Seoul | 2025 | K League 1 | 3 | 0 | 1 | 0 | — | | — | | 4 | 0 |
| FC Seoul | Total | | 13 | 1 | 2 | 0 | — | | — | | 15 | 1 |
| Gimcheon Sangmu (loan) | 2025 | K League 1 | 0 | 0 | 0 | 0 | — | | — | | 0 | 0 |
| Gimcheon Sangmu (loan) | 2026 | K League 1 | 2 | 0 | 0 | 0 | — | | — | | 2 | 0 |
| Gimcheon Sangmu (loan) | Total | | 2 | 0 | 0 | 0 | — | | — | | 2 | 0 |
| Career total | | | 13 | 1 | 2 | 0 | 0 | 0 | 0 | 0 | 15 | 1 |
