= Gbato Seloh Samuel =

Ivorian footballer (born 2006)

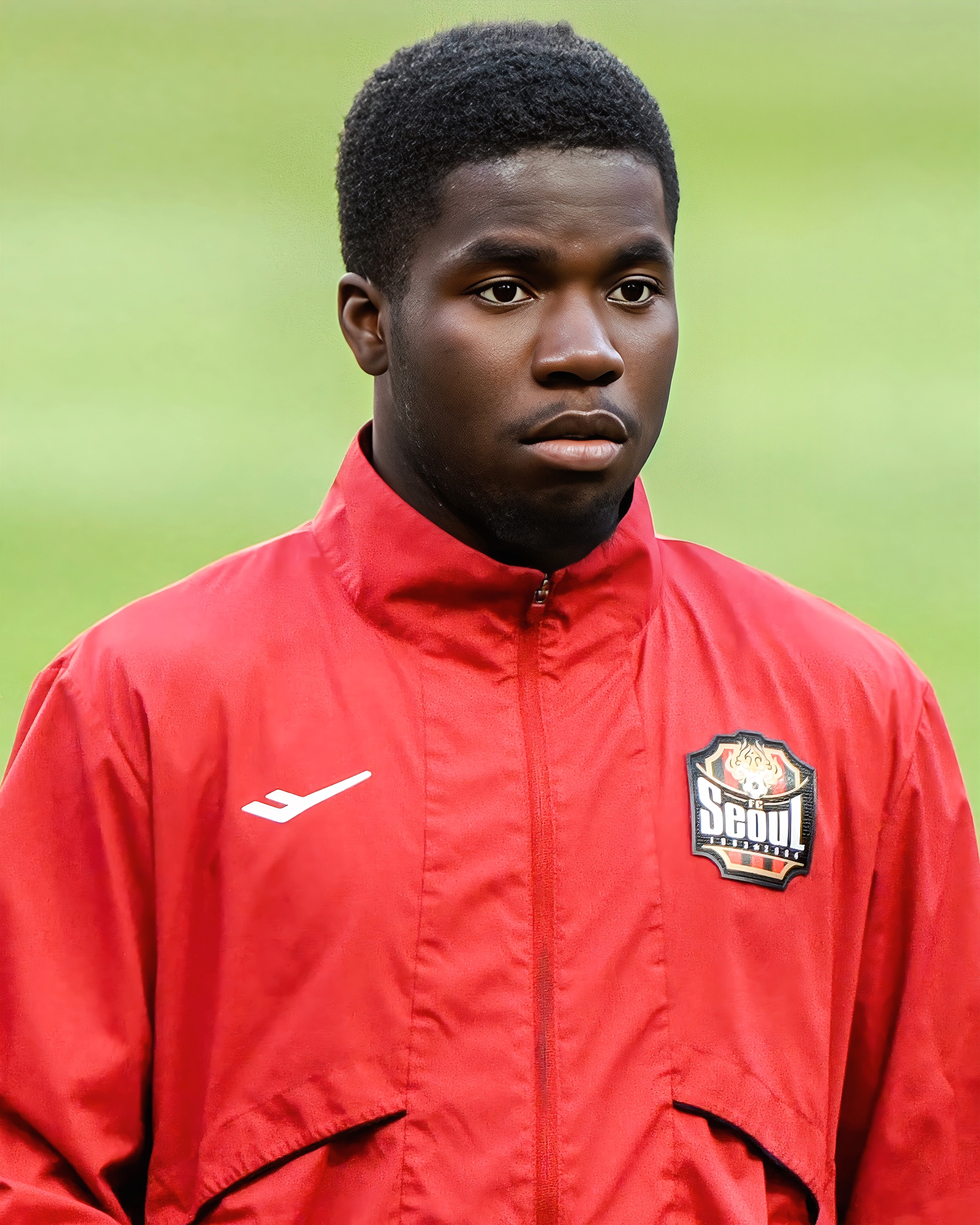
- Samuel in 2026

Personal information
- Date of birth: 1 August 2006 (age 20)
- Place of birth: Seoul, South Korea
- Height: 1.74 m (5 ft 9 in)
- Position: Forward

Team information
- Current team: FC Seoul
- Number: 28

Youth career
- 2019–2024: FC Seoul

Senior career*
Years	Team	Apps	(Gls)
2025–	FC Seoul	2	(0)
- * Club domestic league appearances and goals as of 11:34, 18 October 2026 (UTC)

Gbato Seloh Samuel (Korean: 바또 사무엘; 1 August 2006) is an Ivorian professional footballer who plays as a forward for K League 1 club FC Seoul.

== Early life ==
Samuel was born on 1 August 2006 in Seoul, South Korea, to Ivorian refugee parents. Growing up, he regarded Ivory Coast international Didier Drogba as his football idol and attended Osan Middle School in South Korea and Osan High School in South Korea.

== Career ==
As a youth player, joined South Korean the youth academy of South Korean side FC Seoul and played for the club's under-15 team before being promoted to their under-18 team in 2022. Ahead of the 2025 season, he started his senior career with them as their first homegrown foreign player.

== Style of play ==
Samuel plays as a forward and is left-footed. South Korean news website Insight wrote in 2025 that he " has been in the spotlight since his youth for his outstanding athletic ability and explosive speed".
