= Choi Chul-won =

South Korean footballer (born 1994)

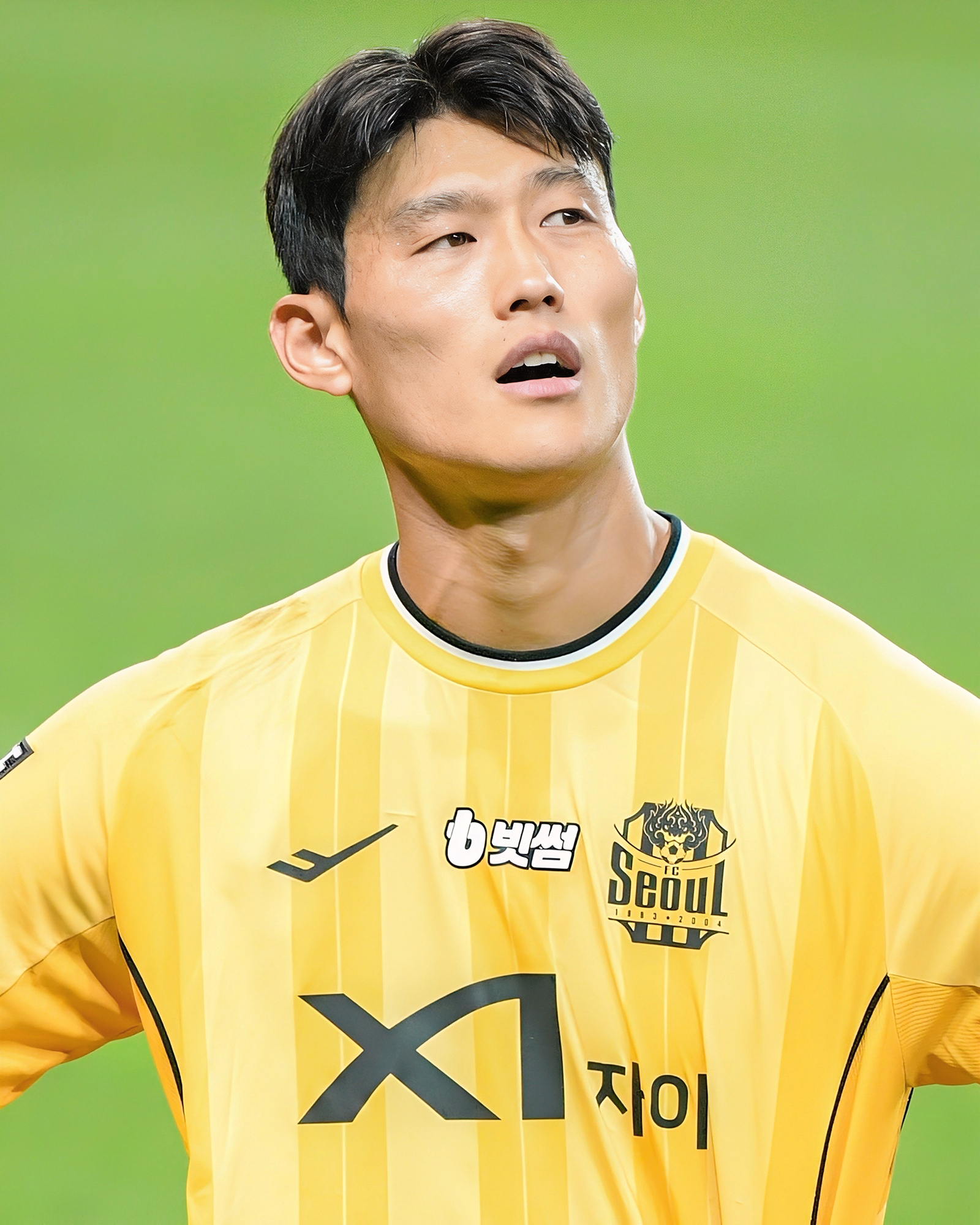
- Choi in 2025

Personal information
- Full name: Choi Chul-won
- Date of birth: 23 July 1994 (age 32)
- Place of birth: South Korea
- Height: 1.94 m (6 ft 4 1/2 in)
- Position: Goalkeeper

Team information
- Current team: FC Seoul
- Number: 21

Youth career
- 2015: Gwangju University

Senior career*
Years	Team	Apps	(Gls)
2014	Yeonggwang FC	?	(?)
2016–2022	Bucheon FC 1995	124	(0)
2019–2021	→ Gimcheon Sangmu (military service)	2	(0)
2023–	FC Seoul	28	(0)
- * Club domestic league appearances and goals as of 5 January 2026 ‡ National team caps and goals as of 6 December 2022

Choi Chul-won (Korean: 최철원; born 23 July 1994) is a South Korean footballer who plays as a goalkeeper for FC Seoul in the K League 1.

== Club career ==
In 2016, Choi Chul-won joined Bucheon FC 1995 and Choi made K League 2 debut against Daejeon Hana Citizen on 19 September 2016.

In 2020 Choi Chul-won joined Sangju Sangmu on military service. In June 2021, he was discharged and returned Bucheon FC 1995.

In 2022 K League 2 season, he gave a well-received performance and his good performance attracted attention of K League 1 clubs.

On 28 December 2022, Choi Chul-won signed a contract with K League 1 side FC Seoul.
