= Ryu Jae-moon =

South Korean footballer (born 1993)

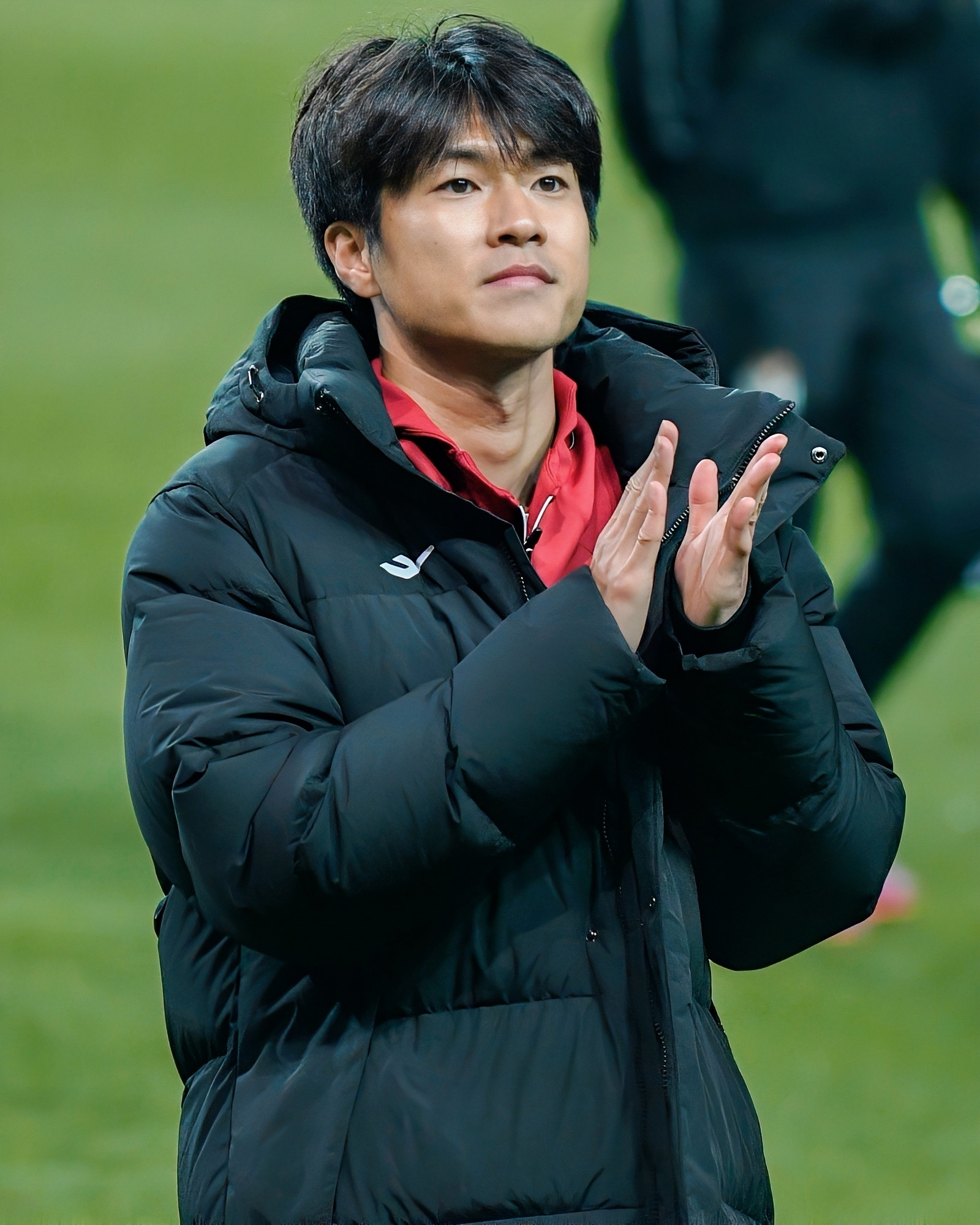
- Ryu in 2025

Personal information
- Date of birth: 8 November 1993 (age 33)
- Place of birth: South Korea
- Height: 1.85 m (6 ft 1 in)
- Position: Midfielder

Team information
- Current team: Daegu FC
- Number: 29

Youth career
- 2012–2014: Yeungnam University

Senior career*
Years	Team	Apps	(Gls)
2015–2020	Daegu FC	129	(12)
2021–2023	Jeonbuk Hyundai Motors	54	(3)
2024–2025	FC Seoul	45	(3)
2026–	Daegu FC	16	(1)

International career
2012–2013	South Korea U-20		
- * Club domestic league appearances and goals as of 5 August 2026

Ryu Jae-moon (Korean: 류재문; born 8 November 1993) is a South Korean footballer who plays as a midfielder for Daegu FC.

== Early life ==
Ryu Jae-moon was born in South Korea. He studied at Yeungnam University.

== Career ==
Born on 8 November 1993, Ryu signed with Daegu FC prior to the start of the 2015 season.

On 11 January 2021, Ryu signed with Jeonbuk Hyundai Motors on a three-year deal.

Ryu's first goal for Jeonbuk came on 6 November 2021, scoring against Ulsan Hyundai in the 65th minute, as his side won 3-2.

On 5 January 2024, Jae-moon joined FC Seoul.

== Career statistics ==
=== Club ===
As of match played 10 November 2024

Appearances and goals by club, season and competition
Club	Season	League			Cup		Continental		Total	
Club	Season	Division	Apps	Goals	Apps	Goals	Apps	Goals	Apps	Goals
Daegu FC	2015	K League 2	36	6	0	0	—		36	6
Daegu FC	2016	K League 2	5	0	0	0	—		5	0
Daegu FC	2017	K League 1	23	1	0	0	—		23	1
Daegu FC	2018	K League 1	23	2	5	0	—		28	2
Daegu FC	2019	K League 1	21	1	1	0	2	0	24	1
Daegu FC	2020	K League 1	21	2	2	0	—		23	2
Daegu FC	Total		129	12	8	0	2	0	139	12
Jeonbuk Hyundai Motors	2021	K League 1	20	1	0	0	6	0	26	1
Jeonbuk Hyundai Motors	2022	K League 1	20	1	2	0	7	0	29	1
Jeonbuk Hyundai Motors	2023	K League 1	14	1	2	0	2	0	18	1
Jeonbuk Hyundai Motors	Total		54	3	4	0	15	0	73	3
FC Seoul	2024	K League 1	25	1	2	0	—		27	1
Career total			208	16	14	0	17	0	239	16

== Honours ==
South Korea U-20

- AFC U-19 Championship: 2012
