= 2020 Pohang Steelers season =

Pohang Steelers
2020 season
- Chairman: Shin Young-gwon
- Manager: Kim Gi-dong
- K League 1: 3rd
- Korean FA Cup: Semi-finals
- Top goalscorer: League: Stanislav Iljutcenko (12 goals); All: Stanislav Iljutcenko (14 goals)
- Lowest home attendance: 0
- Average home league attendance: 0
Home colours	Away colours	Third colours

The 2020 season was Pohang Steelers' thirty-eighth season in the K League 1 in South Korea. Pohang Steelers competed in the K League 1 and the Korean FA Cup. The club played their first match on May 10 before the league was suspended from February because of the COVID-19 pandemic.

== Current squad ==
As of 12 February 2020

Note: Flags indicate national team as defined under FIFA eligibility rules; some limited exceptions apply. Players may hold more than one non-FIFA nationality.

No.	Pos.	Nation	Player
1	GK	KOR	Hwang In-jae
2	DF	KOR	Sim Sang-min
3	DF	KOR	Kim Gwang-seok
4	DF	KOR	Jeon Min-gwang
5	DF	KOR	Ha Chang-rae
6	DF	KOR	Choi Young-jun
7	MF	KOR	Shim Dong-woon
8	MF	AUS	Brandon O'Neill
9	FW	KOR	Heo Yong-joon
10	FW	RUS	Stanislav Iljutcenko
11	MF	KOR	Lee Gwang-hyeok
12	FW	KOR	Song Min-kyu
13	DF	KOR	Kim Yong-hwan
14	DF	KOR	Gwon Wan-gyu
15	DF	KOR	Min Kyoung-hyun
16	MF	KOR	Lee Seung-mo
17	DF	KOR	Kim Sang-won
18	FW	KOR	Moon Kyoung-min

No.	Pos.	Nation	Player
19	DF	KOR	Kim Joo-hwan
20	DF	KOR	Lee Do-hyun
21	GK	KOR	Lee Jun
22	DF	KOR	Park Jae-woo
24	MF	KOR	Yang Tae-ryul
25	DF	KOR	Woo Min-geol
26	MF	SRB	Aleksandar Paločević
27	MF	KOR	Park Jae-hoon
28	MF	KOR	Choi Jae-young
29	FW	KOR	Kim Dong-bum
31	GK	KOR	Kang Hyeon-mu
36	DF	KOR	Kim Min-kyu
41	GK	KOR	Cho Sung-hoon
77	FW	COL	Manuel Palacios
79	MF	KOR	Go Young-joon
88	MF	KOR	Kim Kyu-pyo
91	GK	KOR	Noh Ji-hoon
99	FW	KOR	Lee Ji-yong

== Transfer ==
=== Loan out ===
Note: Flags indicate national team as defined under FIFA eligibility rules; some limited exceptions apply. Players may hold more than one non-FIFA nationality.

No.	Pos.	Nation	Player
—	MF	KOR	Kwon Ki-pyo (at FC Anyang)
—	MF	KOR	Kim Ji-min (Unknown)
—	FW	KOR	Kim Chan (at Chungnam Asan)
—	FW	KOR	Ha Seung-un (at Jeonnam Dragons)

No.	Pos.	Nation	Player
—	FW	KOR	Lee Sang-ki (at Jeonnam Dragons for military duty)
—	MF	KOR	Lee Soo-bin (at Jeonbuk Hyundai)
—	MF	KOR	Kim Jin-hyun (at Gwangju FC)

== Coaching staff ==
Position	Staff
Manager	(South Korea) Kim Gi-dong
Assistant Manager	(South Korea) Lee Sang-uk
GK Coach	(South Korea) Ho jin-Park
Physical Coach	(South Korea) Park Hyo-jun
Match Analyst	(South Korea) Park Cheol-ho
Translator	(South Korea) Lee Sang-min
Translator	(South Korea) Ki Ji-yong

Last updated: 10 May 2020
Source: Pohang Steelers

== Competitions ==
=== K League 1 ===
==== Results summary ====
Overall								Home						Away					
Pld	W	D	L	GF	GA	GD	Pts	W	D	L	GF	GA	GD	W	D	L	GF	GA	GD
27	15	5	7	56	35	+21	50	8	3	3	30	21	+9	7	2	4	26	14	+12

==== Results by round ====
Round	1	2	3	4	5	6	7	8	9	10	11	12	13	14	15	16	17	18	19	20	21	22	23	24	25	26	27
Ground	H	A	H	A	H	A	H	H	A	A	H	A	H	A	H	A	A	H	H	A	A	H	H	A	H	A	H
Result	W	D	L	W	L	W	L	W	W	W	D	W	D	L	D	L	L	W	W	W	D	W	W	W	W	L	W
Position	3	1	4	4	6	4	4	4	3	5	4	4	3	3	3	4	5	4	4	4	4	3	3	3	3	3	3

Updated to match(es) played on 1 November 2020. Source: League Fixtures and Results
A = Away; H = Home; W = Win; D = Draw; L = Loss

==== League table ====
Pos	Team	Pld	W	D	L	GF	GA	GD	Pts	Qualification or relegation (Note: Teams are split into two groups (Final A and Final B) after each have played 22 matches.)
1	Jeonbuk Hyundai Motors (C)	27	19	3	5	46	21	+25	60	Qualification for Champions League group stage
2	Ulsan Hyundai	27	17	6	4	54	23	+31	57	Qualification for Champions League group stage
3	Pohang Steelers	27	15	5	7	56	35	+21	50	Qualification for Champions League group stage
4	Sangju Sangmu (Note: Sangju Sangmu were a military team and were not eligible to represent South Korea in the AFC club competitions. Additionally, they were relegated to K League 2 regardless of their final position by moving their stronghold the next season.) (R)	27	13	5	9	34	36	−2	44	Relegation to K League 2
5	Daegu FC	27	10	8	9	43	39	+4	38	Qualification for Champions League group stage

Source: K League
Rules for classification: 1) Points; 2) Goals scored; 3) Goal difference; 4) Wins; 5) Head-to-head points
(C) Champions; (R) Relegated

==== Matches ====
All times are Korea Standard Time (KST) – UTC+9

10 May 2020 1	Pohang Steelers	2–0	Busan IPark	Pohang, Gyeongbuk
14:00 KST	Iljutcenko 24'; Palocevic 72' (pen.); Choi (yellow card) 52'; Sim (yellow card) 72'	Report	Soo (yellow card) 30'	Stadium: Pohang Steel Yard; Attendance: 0 Referee: Kim Yong-Woo

16 May 2020 2	Daegu	1–1	Pohang Steelers	Suseong-gu, Daegu
16:30 KST	Edgar 67'; Hong (yellow card) 72'; Kim (yellow card) 90+3'	Report	Paločević 43'	Stadium: Daegu Stadium; Attendance: 0 Referee: Kim Jong-hyeok

22 May 2020 3	Pohang Steelers	1–2	Seoul	Pohang, Gyeongbuk
17:30 KST	Iljutcenko 5'; Chang (yellow card) 15'; O'Neill (yellow card) 41'	Report	Hwang 35'; Go (yellow card) 56'; Osmar Barba 74'; Kim (yellow card) 90+4'	Stadium: Pohang Steel Yard; Attendance: 0 Referee: Kim Woo-sung

31 May 2020 4	Incheon United	1–4	Pohang Steelers	Jung-gu, Incheon
19:00 KST	Kim 26'; Kim (yellow card) 45+2'	Report	Iljutcenko 7'; Ha (yellow card) 14'; Ha 17'; Lee (yellow card) 43'; Lee 73'; Song 90'	Stadium: Incheon Football Stadium; Attendance: 0 Referee: Ko Hyung-jin

6 June 2020 5	Pohang Steelers	0–4	Ulsan	Pohang, Gyeongbuk
19:00 KST	Iljutcenko (yellow card) 16'	Report	Kim (yellow card) 16'; Lee 26', 37'; In-sung 76'; Júnior 86'; Dong-gyeong (yellow card) 90+2'	Stadium: Pohang Steel Yard; Attendance: 0 Referee: Kim Jong-hyeok

13 June 2020 6	Sangju Sangmu	2–4	Pohang Steelers	Gyeongsangbuk-do, Sangju
19:00 KST	Ko Myeong-seok (yellow card) 37'; Oh Se-hun 43', 70' (pen.); Oh Se-hun (yellow card) 59'	Report	Chang (yellow card) 29'; Iljutcenko 40', 49'; Paločević 45+4', 78'; Choi Young-jun (yellow card) 46'	Stadium: Sangju Civic Stadium; Attendance: 0 Referee: Kim Dae-Yong

16 June 2020 7	Pohang Steelers	1–2	Jeonbuk	Pohang, Gyeongbuk
19:30 KST	Kim Sang-won (yellow card) 6'; Lee Seung-mo 41'; Palocevic (yellow card) 52'; O'Neill (yellow card) 57'; Lee Seung-mo (yellow card) 60'; Iljutcenko (yellow card) 70'	Report	Han Kyo-won 61'; Son Jun-ho (yellow card) 87'; Kim Min-hyeok 90+2'	Stadium: Pohang Steel Yard; Attendance: 0 Referee: Park Byung-Jin

20 June 2020 8	Pohang Steelers	2–0	Gangwon	Pohang, Gyeongbuk
19:00 KST	Iljutcenko 62' (pen.); Shim Dong-woon (yellow card) 79'; Kwon Wan-kyu 83'; Park Jae-woo (yellow card) 90+3'	Report	Shin Kwang-Hoon (yellow card) 59'; Kim Oh-gyu (yellow card) 90'	Stadium: Pohang Steel Yard; Attendance: 0 Referee: Park Byung-Jin

26 June 2020 9	Gwangju	0–2	Pohang Steelers	Seo-gu, Gwangju
19:00 KST	Willyan (yellow card) 63'; Lim Min-hyuk (yellow card) 90+4'; Kim Chang-soo (yellow card) 90+6'	Report	Choi Young-jun (yellow card) 24'; Palacios 34'; Oh Beom-seok (yellow card) 41'; Song Min-kyu 90'	Stadium: Gwangju World Cup Stadium; Attendance: 0 Referee: Kim Woo-sung

5 July 2020 10	Seongnam	0–4	Pohang Steelers	Bundang-gu, Seongnam
19:00 KST		Report	Song Min-kyu 23', 53'; Ha Chang-rae (yellow card) 43'; Iljutcenko 45+2'; Palacios 70'	Stadium: Tancheon Sports Complex; Attendance: 0 Referee: Lee Dong-jun

11 July 2020 11	Pohang Steelers	1–1	Suwon	Pohang, Gyeongbuk
19:00 KST	Palacios (yellow card) 33'; O'Neill (yellow card) 45+1'; Song 60'	Report	Taggart 38'; Antonis (yellow card) 52'	Stadium: Pohang Steel Yard; Attendance: 0 Referee: Park Byung-jin

18 July 2020 12	Seoul	1–3	Pohang Steelers	Mapo-gu, Seoul
20:00 KST	Cho Young-wook 38'; Kim Nam-chun (yellow card) 57'	Summary	Iljutcenko 52', 62' (pen.); Lee Gwang-hyuk (yellow card) 57'; Song Min-kyu (yellow card) 90+1'; Palacios 90+2'	Stadium: Seoul World Cup Stadium; Attendance: 0 Referee: Kim Jong-hyeok

26 July 2020 13	Pohang Steelers	1–1	Incheon	Pohang, Gyeongbuk
19:00 KST	Iljutcenko 34'; Kwon Wan-kyu (yellow card) 64'	Summary	Mugoša 29' (pen.); Lee Jae-sung (yellow card) 74'; Mun Ji-hwan (yellow card) 90+3'	Stadium: Pohang Steel Yard; Attendance: 0 Referee: Ko Hyung-jin

1 August 2020 14	Jeonbuk	2–1	Pohang Steelers	Jeonju
19:00 KST	Son Jun-ho 61'; Kim Bo-kyung 70'	Summary	Palacios (red card) 31'; Song Min-kyu 55'; Kang Hyeon-mu (yellow card) 70'; Iljutcenko (yellow card) 90'	Stadium: Jeonju World Cup Stadium; Attendance: 2,959; Referee: Kim Woo-sung

8 August 2020 15	Pohang Steelers	1–1	Gwangju	Pohang, Gyeongbuk
19:00 KST	Kim Sang-won (yellow card) 39'; Park Jae-Woo (yellow card) 68'; Go Young-jun 90+1'	Summary	Willyan (yellow card) 26'; Felipe 63' (pen.); Felipe (yellow card) 87'	Stadium: Pohang Steel Yard; Attendance: 1,263; Referee: Kim Dae-yong

15 August 2020 16	Ulsan	2–0	Pohang Steelers	Ulsan
19:00 KST	Kim In-sung 55'; Johnsen 57'; Koh Myong-Jin (yellow card) 59'	Report	Ha Chang-rae (yellow card) 32'	Stadium: Ulsan Munsu Football Stadium; Attendance: 3,242; Referee: Park Byung-jin

23 August 2020 17	Busan	2–1	Pohang Steelers	Busan
19:00 KST	Kang Min-soo 14'; Lee Jeong-hyeop 36' (pen.)	Report	Kim Sang-won (yellow card) 4' (yellow-red card) 83'; Lee Gwang-hyuk 61'; Paločević (yellow card) 65'; Kim Gwang-seok (yellow card) 90'; Jeon Min-gwang (yellow card) 90+5'	Stadium: Busan Gudeok Stadium′ Attendance: 0 Referee: Ko Hyung-jin

30 August 2020 18	Pohang Steelers	2–1	Seongnam	Pohang, Gyeongbuk
19:00 KST	Iljutcenko 52', 56'; Iljutcenko (yellow card) 73'	Report	Na Sang-ho 20'	Stadium: Pohang Steel Yard; Attendance: 0 Referee: Cho Ji-um

5 September 2020 19	Pohang Steelers	3–2	Daegu	Pohang, Gyeongbuk
19:00 KST	Paločević 21' (pen.); Palacios 51'; Palacios (yellow card) 71'; Song Min-kyu 82'; Choi Young-jun (yellow card) 90+2'	Report	Cesinha 7', 34'; Jo Jin-woo (yellow card) 84'; Jeong Seung-won (yellow card) 90+2'; Kim Woo-seok (yellow card) 90+4'	Stadium: Pohang Steel Yard; Attendance: 0 Referee: Chae Sang-hyeop

13 September 2020 20	Gangwon	0–3	Pohang Steelers	Chuncheon
19:00 KST	Lim Chai-min (yellow card) 21'; Shin Kwang-hoon (yellow card) 49'; Koim Young-bin (yellow card) 85'	Report	Palacios 1'; Song Min-kyu 26'; Paločević 64'; Kim Gwang-seok (yellow card) 81'; Lee Seung-mo (yellow card) 87'	Stadium: Chuncheon Songam Sports Town; Attendance: 0 Referee: Park Byung-jin

16 September 2020 21	Suwon	0–0	Pohang Steelers	Suwon
19:00 KST		Report	Kang Sang-woo (yellow card) 15'; Palacios (yellow card) 22'; Iljutcenko (yellow card) 86'; Choi Young-jun (yellow card) 89'	Stadium: Suwon World Cup Stadium; Attendance: 0 Referee: Kim Yong-woo

20 September 2020 22	Pohang Steelers	4–3	Sangju	Pohang, Gyeongbuk
15:00 KST	Paločević 28', 38', 90+6'; Jeon Min-kwan (red card) 39'; Palacios (yellow card) 55'; Lee Seung-mo (yellow card) 57'; Kim Sang-won (yellow card) 63'; Song Min-kyu 74'; Ha Chang-rae (yellow card) 77'; Kang Sang-Woo (yellow card) 90+5'	Report	Kwon Kyung-won (yellow card) 45'; Moon Seon-min 59' (pen.); Jeong Jae-hee 60'; Kim Min-hyeok 85'	Stadium: Pohang Steel Yard; Attendance: 0 Referee: Kim Woo-sung

27 September 2020 23 (Final A)	Pohang Steelers	5–3	Gwangju	Pohang, Gyeongbuk
19:00 KST	Lee Gwang-hyuk (yellow card) 29'; Iljutcenko 36', 71', 89'; Ha Chang-rae (yellow card) 54'; Palocevic 77' (pen.); Lee Seung-mo (yellow card) 57'; Kim Sang-won (yellow card) 63'; Song Min-kyu 74'; Ha Chang-rae (yellow card) 77'	Report	Willyan (yellow card) 10'; Silva 56'; Eom Won-sang 69'; Hong Joon-ho (red card) 76'; Felipe (red card) 82'	Stadium: Pohang Steel Yard; Attendance: 0 Referee: Lee Dong-jun

3 October 2020 24 (Final A)	Jeonbuk	0–1	Pohang Steelers	Jeonju
19:00 KST	Hong Jeong-ho (yellow card) 41'	Report	Song Min-kyu 60'; Kang Hyeon-mu (yellow card) 84'; Palocevic (yellow card) 90+1'	Stadium: Jeonju World Cup Stadium; Attendance: 0 Referee: Kim Jong-hyeok

18 October 2020 25 (Final A)	Pohang Steelers	4–0	Ulsan	Pohang
19:00 KST	Iljutcenko 3', 73'; Lee Gwang-hyuk (yellow card) 11'; Palocevic 81', 82'	Report	Jung Seung-hyun (yellow card) 22'; Bulthuis (red card) 59'; Johnsen (red card) 63'	Stadium: Pohang Steel Yard; Attendance: 2,453; Referee: Kim Woo-sung

25 October 2020 26 (Final A)	Daegu	3–2	Pohang Steelers	Daegu
14:00 KST	Cesinha 7', 86'; Park Han-bin (yellow card) 25'; Damjanović 60'; Jeong Tae-uk (yellow card) 81'; Jeong Seung-won (yellow card) 83'; Lee Jin-hyun (yellow card) 89'	Report	Palocevic 31'; Iljutcenko (yellow card) 59'; Jeon Min-kwang (yellow card) 71'; Iljutcenko 85'; Oh Beom-Seok (yellow card) 90+3'	Stadium: Daegu Civic Stadium; Attendance: 3,030; Referee: Chae Sang-Hyeop

1 November 2020 27 (Final A)	Pohang Steelers	3–1	Sangju Sangmu	Pohang
15:00 KST	Kang Sang-woo 62'; Palacios (yellow card) 73'; Iljutcenko 79'; Ha Chang-rae (yellow card) 83'; Goh Young-jun 85'	Report	Kwon Kyung-won 84' (pen.)	Stadium: Pohang Steel Yard; Attendance: 3,280; Referee: Lee Dong-Jun

=== Korean FA Cup ===
==== Matches ====
1 July 2020 Third round	Pohang Steelers	1–0	Gyeongju Citizen	Pohang, Gyeongbuk
19:00 KST	Lee (yellow card) 21'; Oh (yellow card) 21'; Lee 86'; Choi (yellow card) 89'	Report	Yun (yellow card) 77'; Kwon (yellow card) 83'	Stadium: Pohang Steel Yard; Attendance: 0 Referee: Jeong Heui-su

15 July 2020 Fourth round	Sangju Sangmu	2–3 (a.e.t.)	Pohang Steelers	Sangju
19:00 KST	Jeong Jae-hee 31'; Heo Yong-joon 59'	Summary	Iljutcenko 17', 120+1'; Choi Young-jun 65'	Stadium: Sangju Civic Stadium; Attendance: 0 Referee: Jeong Dong-sik

15 July 2020 Quarter-finals	Seoul	1–5	Pohang Steelers	Seoul
19:30 KST	Jeong Hyeon-cheol 33'; Yu Sang-hun (yellow card) 42'; Jeong Hyeon-cheol (yellow card) 59'; Hwang Hyun-soo (yellow card) 85'	Summary	Song Min-kyu 13'; Kim Gwang-seok 32'; Iljutcenko (yellow card) 59'; Park Jae-Woo (yellow card) 63'; Iljutcenko 83', 90+1'; Shim Dong-woon 89'	Stadium: Seoul World Cup Stadium; Attendance: 0 Referee: Kim Jong-hyeok

23 September 2020 Semi-finals	Ulsan Hyundai	1–1 (a.e.t.)	Pohang Steelers	Ulsan
18:30 KST	Sin Jin-ho (yellow card) 23'; Kim Tae-hwan (yellow card) 33'; Kim In-Sung 53'; Jung Seung-hyun (yellow card) 54'	Summary	Kim Tae-hwan 12' (o.g.); Ha Chang-rae (yellow card) 56'	Stadium: Ulsan Munsu Football Stadium; Attendance: 0 Referee: Chae Sang-hyeop
	Penalties
	Johnsen (penalty scored); Won Du-jae (penalty scored); Kim In-sung (penalty missed); Yoon Bit-garam (penalty scored); Negrão (penalty missed); Jung Seung-hyun (penalty missed); Lee Dong-gyeong (penalty missed); Hong Chul (penalty scored)		Iljutcenko (penalty missed); Shim Dong-woon (penalty scored); Kang Sang-woo (penalty scored); Lee Seung-mo (penalty scored); Paločević (penalty missed); Kang Hyeon-mu (penalty missed); Choi Young-jun (penalty missed); Song Min-kyu (penalty missed)

== Squad statistics ==
=== Appearances ===
No.	Nat.	Pos.	Name	K League		FA Cup		Champions League		TOTAL	
No.	Nat.	Pos.	Name	Apps	Goals	Apps	Goals	Apps	Goals	Apps	Goals
31	(South Korea)	GK	Kang Hyeon-mu	10	0	0	0	0	0	10	0
1	(South Korea)	GK	Hwang In-jae	0	0	1	0	0	0	1	0
3	(South Korea)	DF	Kim Gwang-seok	10	0	0	0	0	0	10	0
4	(South Korea)	DF	Jeon Min-gwang	2(2)	0	1	0	0	0	3(2)	0
5	(South Korea)	DF	Ha Chang-rae	10	1	1	0	0	0	11	0
6	(South Korea)	DF	Choi Young-jun	9	0	1	0	0	0	10	0
7	(South Korea)	MF	Shim Dong-woon	6(4)	0	1	0	0	0	7(4)	0
8	(Australia)	MF	Brandon O'Neill	7	0	0(1)	0	0	0	7(1)	0
9	(South Korea)	FW	Nam Joon-jae	0(1)	0	0	0	0	0	0(1)	0
10	(Russia)	FW	Stanislav Iljutcenko	10	7	1	0	0	0	11	7
11	(South Korea)	MF	Lee Gwang-hyeok	1(8)	0	1	0	0	0	2(8)	0
12	(South Korea)	FW	Song Min-kyu	8(2)	3	0(1)	0	0	0	8(3)	3
14	(South Korea)	DF	Gwon Wan-gyu	5(1)	1	0	1	0	0	6(1)	1
15	(South Korea)	DF	Min Kyung-hyun	0	0	0	0	0	0	0	0
16	(South Korea)	MF	Lee Seung-mo	4(3)	2	1	1	0	0	5(3)	3
17	(South Korea)	DF	Kim Sang-won	3	0	0	0	0	0	3	0
18	(South Korea)	FW	Mun Kyung-min	0	0	0	0	0	0	0	0
19	(South Korea)	DF	Kim Joo-hwan	0	0	0	0	0	0	0	0
20	(South Korea)	DF	Lee Do-hyun	0	0	0	0	0	0	0	0
21	(South Korea)	GK	Jun Lee	0	0	0	0	0	0	0	0
22	(South Korea)	GK	Park Jae-woo	2(1)	0	1	0	0	0	3(1)	0
25	(South Korea)	GK	Woo Min-geol	0	0	0	0	0	0	0	0
26	(Serbia)	MF	Aleksandar Paločević	7	4	0	0	0	0	7	4
27	(South Korea)	MF	Park Jae-hoon	1	0	0	0	0	0	1	0
28	(South Korea)	MF	Choi Jae-young	0	0	0	0	0	0	0	0
29	(South Korea)	FW	Kim Dong-bum	0	0	0	0	0	0	0	0
36	(South Korea)	DF	Kim Min-kyu	0	0	0	0	0	0	0	0
41	(South Korea)	GK	Cho Sung-hoon	0	0	0	0	0	0	0	0
47	(South Korea)	MF	Oh Beom-seok	1	0	1	0	0	0	2	0
77	(Colombia)	FW	Manuel Palacios	9(1)	2	0(1)	0	0	0	9(2)	2
79	(South Korea)	MF	Go Young-joon	0(2)	0	0	0	0	0	0(2)	0
88	(South Korea)	MF	Kim Kyu-pyo	0	0	0	0	0	0	0	0
91	(South Korea)	GK	Noh Ji-hoon	0	0	0	0	0	0	0	0
99	(South Korea)	FW	Lee Ji-yong	0	0	0	0	0	0	0	0
Players who left the club in Transfer window or on loan
2	(South Korea)	DF	Sim Sang-min	3	0	0	0	0	0	3	0
9	(South Korea)	FW	Heo Yong-joon	2	0	0	0	0	0	2	0
13	(South Korea)	DF	Kim Yong-hwan	3	0	0	0	0	0	3	0
24	(South Korea)	GK	Park Jae-woo	2	0	0	0	0	0	2	0

=== Goal scorers ===
The list is sorted by shirt number when total goals are equal.

Rnk	Pos	No.	Player	K League 1	FA Cup	Champions League	Total
1	FW	10	(Russia) Stanislav Iljutcenko	18	2	0	20
2	MF	26	(Serbia) Aleksandar Paločević	11	0	0	11
3	FW	12	(South Korea) Song Min-kyu	10	0	0	10
4	FW	77	(Colombia) Manuel Palacios	4	0	0	4
4	MF	79	(South Korea) Go Young-jun	2	0	0	2
5	DF	27	(South Korea) Lee Seung-mo	1	2	0	3
6	DF	3	(South Korea) Kim Gwang-seok	0	1	0	1
6	DF	5	(South Korea) Ha Chang-rae	1	0	0	1
6	DF	12	(South Korea) Lee Gwang-hyuk	1	0	0	1
6	DF	22	(South Korea) Park Jae-Woo	0	1	0	1
6	MF	13	(South Korea) Kang Sang-woo	1	0	0	1
6	MF	6	(South Korea) Choi Young-jun	0	1	0	1
6	FW	7	(South Korea) Shim Dong-woon	0	1	0	1
TOTALS				49	4	0	53

Last updated: 25 November 2020.
Source: kleague.com,

=== Assists ===
Rnk	Pos	No.	Player	K League 1	FA Cup	Champions League	Total
1	MF	26	(Serbia) Aleksandar Paločević	4	2	0	6
1	FW	10	(Russia) Stanislav Iljutcenko	3	2	0	5
3	FW	12	(South Korea) Lee Gwang-hyuk	3	0	0	3
3	FW	77	(Colombia) Palacios	3	0	0	3
5	FW	10	(South Korea) Song Min-kyu	2	0	0	2
6	FW	13	(South Korea) Kim Yong-hwan	1	0	0	1
6	GK	31	(South Korea) Kang Hyeon-mu	1	0	0	1
6	MF	6	(South Korea) Choi Young-jun	1	0	0	1
6	FW	7	(South Korea) Shim Dong-woon	1	0	0	1
TOTALS				19	4	0	23

=== Clean sheets ===
The list is sorted by shirt number when total clean sheets are equal.

Rnk	No.	Player	K League 1	FA Cup	Champions League	Total
1	31	(South Korea) Kang Hyeon-mu	4	0	0	4
2	1	(South Korea) Hwang In-jae	0	1	0	1
TOTALS			4	1	0	5

Last updated: 6 July 2020.
Source: kleague.com
