= Min-hyuk =

- Hangul: 민혁
- RR: Minhyeok
- MR: Minhyŏk

Min-hyuk is a Korean given name.

== People ==
People with this name include:

=== Entertainers ===
- Jang Min-hyeok (born 1978), South Korean voice actor
- Kang Min-hyuk (born 1991), South Korean musician and actor, member of boy band CNBLUE
- Lee Min-hyuk (rapper, born 1990), South Korean singer, member of boy band BtoB
- Lee Min-hyuk (born 1990), stage name B-Bomb, South Korean singer, member of boy band Block B
- Lee Min-hyuk (singer, born 1993), South Korean singer, member of boy band Monsta X
- Park Min-hyuk (born 1999), stage name Rocky, South Korean singer, member of boy band Astro
- Ji Min-hyuk (born 2001), South Korean actor

=== Sportspeople ===
- Gang Min-hyeok (born 1981), South Korean alpine skier
- Kang Min-hyuk (footballer) (born 1982), South Korean football midfielder (K-League Challenge)
- Cho Min-hyeok (born 1987), South Korean tennis player
- Kim Min-hyeok (footballer, born February 1992), South Korean football midfielder (K-League Classic)
- Kim Min-hyeok (footballer, born August 1992), South Korean football defender (J-League Division 1)
- Lim Min-hyuk (born 1994), South Korean football goalkeeper (K League 1)
- Ko Min-hyuk (born 1996), South Korean football defender (K League 1)
- Kim Min-hyeok (baseball) (born 1996), South Korean baseball infielder
- Lim Min-hyeok (born 1997), South Korean football midfielder (K League 1 and youth national team)
- Kang Min-hyuk (badminton) (born 1999), South Korean badminton player

== Fictional characters ==
Fictional characters with this name include:

- Yoo Min-hyuk, in 2004 South Korean television series Full House
- Oh Min-hyuk, in 2011 South Korean television series Poseidon
- Min-hyuk, in 2012 South Korean television series Salamander Guru and The Shadows
- Shin Min-hyuk, in 2012 South Korean television series Cheongdam-dong Alice
- Jo Min-hyuk, in 2013 South Korean television series Secret Love
- Ahn Min-hyuk, in 2017 South Korean television series Strong Woman Do Bong-soon
- Lee Min-hyuk, in 2020 South Korean television series The Penthouse: War in Life

== See also ==
- List of Korean given names
