= Kim Sang-won =

Kim Sang-won may refer to:

- Kim Sang-won (footballer)
- Kim Sang-won (judge)
