= 2026 FC Seoul season =

FC Seoul
2026 season
- Chairman: Huh Tae-soo
- Manager: Kim Gi-dong
- Stadium: Seoul World Cup Stadium
- K League 1: Champions
- Korea Cup: Third round
- AFC Champions League Elite: Round of 16
| Home colours | Away colours |

The 2026 season is FC Seoul's 43rd season in the K League 1, the top tier of South Korean football. The club also participates in the 2026–27 edition of the Korea Cup, in the 2025–26 AFC Champions League Elite, and in the 2026–27 AFC Champions League Two.

== Players ==
| No. | Player | Nationality | Date of birth (age) | Previous club | Contract since | Contract end |
Goalkeepers
| 1 | Lim Jun-sub | (South Korea) | 22 August 2003 (age 23) | (South Korea) Jeju SK | 2025 | |
| 25 | Gu Sung-yun | (South Korea) | 27 June 1994 (age 32) | (South Korea) Seoul E-Land | 2026 | |
| 31 | Kang Hyeon-mu | (South Korea) | 13 March 1995 (age 31) | (South Korea) Gimcheon Sangmu FC | 2024 | |
| 71 | Yun Ki-wook | (South Korea) | 10 October 2006 (age 20) | Youth Team | 2025 | |
Defenders
| 4 | Lee Sang-min | (South Korea) | 1 January 1998 (age 28) | (South Korea) Gimcheon Sangmu FC | 2021 | 2025 |
| 5 | Yazan Al-Arab | (Jordan) | 31 January 1996 (age 30) | (Qatar) Muaither SC | 2024 | |
| 16 | Choi Jun | (South Korea) | 17 April 1999 (age 27) | (South Korea) Busan IPark | 2024 | |
| 17 | Ahn Jae-min | (South Korea) | 23 January 2003 (age 23) | (South Korea) Gimpo FC | 2022 | |
| 20 | Lee Han-do | (South Korea) | 16 March 1994 (age 32) | (South Korea) Busan IPark | 2025 | |
| 22 | Kim Jin-su | (South Korea) | 13 June 1992 (age 34) | (South Korea) Jeonbuk Hyundai Motors | 2025 | |
| 36 | Kim Ji-Won | (South Korea) | 12 February 2004 (age 22) | (South Korea) Yangpyeong FC | 2023 | |
| 37 | Juan Antonio Ros | (Spain) | 28 July 1999 (age 27) | (China) Tianjin Jinmen Tiger | 2026 | |
| 40 | Park Seong-hoon | (South Korea) | 27 January 2003 (age 23) | Youth Team | 2016 | |
| 66 | Park Soo-il | (South Korea) | 22 February 1996 (age 30) | (South Korea) Gimcheon Sangmu FC | 2023 | |
Midfielders
| 6 | Hrvoje Babec | (Croatia) | 15 March 1996 (age 30) | (Croatia) Osijek | 2026 | |
| 7 | Jeong Seung-won | (South Korea) | 27 February 1997 (age 29) | (South Korea) Suwon FC | 2025 | |
| 8 | Lee Seung-mo | (South Korea) | 30 March 1998 (age 28) | (South Korea) Pohang Steelers | 2023 | 2026 |
| 25 | Paik Sang-hoon | (South Korea) | 7 January 2002 (age 24) | (South Korea) Seosan Pioneer | 2015 | |
| 41 | Hwang Do-yoon | (South Korea) | 9 April 2003 (age 23) | (South Korea) Korea University | 2023 | |
| 42 | Son Jeong-beom | (South Korea) | 28 September 2007 (age 19) | Youth Team | 2023 | |
| 88 | Park Jang Han-gyeol | (South Korea) | 15 February 2004 (age 22) | (South Korea) Boin High School | 2022 | |
| 99 | Gbato Seloh Samuel^{Home Grown FP} | (Ivory Coast) | 1 August 2006 (age 20) | (South Korea) Youth Team | 2025 | |
| | Kim Min-joon | (South Korea) | 6 April 2003 (age 23) | (South Korea) Seosan Citizen | 2026 | |
Forwards
| 9 | Patryk Klimala | (Poland) | 5 August 1998 (age 28) | (Australia) Sydney FC | 2025 | |
| 10 | Anderson Oliveira | (Brazil) | 16 July 1998 (age 28) | (South Korea) Suwon FC | 2025 | |
| 11 | Leonardo Acevedo | (Brazil) | 18 April 1996 (age 30) | (South Korea) Seongnam FC | 2026 | |
| 14 | Jeong Hyeon-woo | (South Korea) | 2 September 2004 (age 22) | (South Korea) Siheung City FC | 2026 | |
| 18 | Cho Young-wook | (South Korea) | 5 February 1999 (age 27) | (South Korea) Gimcheon Sangmu FC | 2018 | |
| 19 | Cheon Seong-hoon | (South Korea) | 21 September 2000 (age 26) | (South Korea) Daejeon Hana Citizen | 2025 | |
| 27 | Moon Seon-min | (South Korea) | 9 June 1992 (age 34) | (South Korea) Jeonbuk Hyundai Motors | 2025 | 2025 |
Players who went out on military service during season
| 1 | Baek Jong-bum | (South Korea) | 21 January 2001 (age 25) | (South Korea) Osan High School | 2019 | |
| 19 | Kang Ju-hyeok (M) | (South Korea) | 27 August 2006 (age 20) | (South Korea) Osan High School | 2024 | |
Players who went out on loan during season
| 15 | Kim Hyeon-deok | (South Korea) | 5 November 2004 (age 22) | (South Korea) Boin High School | 2023 | |
| 24 | Cho Young-kwang | (South Korea) | 11 March 2004 (age 22) | (Japan) FC Osaka | 2022 | |
| 33 | Bae Hyun-seo | (South Korea) | 16 February 2005 (age 21) | Youth Team | 2018 | |
| 44 | Ham Sun-woo | (South Korea) | 28 January 2005 (age 21) | (South Korea) Shinpyeong High School | 2024 | |
| 72 | Min Ji-hoon | (South Korea) | 31 March 2005 (age 21) | Youth Team | 2018 | 2025 |
| 77 | Lucas Rodrigues | (Brazil) | 27 August 1999 (age 27) | (Portugal) Marítimo | 2024 | |
Players who left mid-season
| 34 | Song Min-kyu | (South Korea) | 12 September 1999 (age 27) | (South Korea) Jeonbuk Hyundai Motors | 2026 | |
| 62 | Aleksandar Paločević | (Serbia) | 22 August 1993 (age 33) | (China) Nantong Zhiyun | 2021 | |

== Transfers ==
=== Pre-season ===
==== In ====
Transfers in

| Date | Position | Player | Transferred from | Ref |
Permanent Transfer
| 24 December 2025 | GK | (South Korea) Gu Sung-yun | (South Korea) Seoul E-Land | Free |
| 25 December 2025 | MF | (South Korea) Kang Seong-jin | (South Korea) Suwon Samsung Bluewings | End of loan |
| 31 December 2025 | GK | (South Korea) Lee Seung-hwan | (South Korea) Chungbuk Cheongju FC | End of loan |
| 31 December 2025 | MF | (Serbia) Aleksandar Palocevic | (China) Nantong Zhiyun | End of loan |
| 1 January 2026 | FW | (Brazil) Leonardo Acevedo | (South Korea) Seongnam FC | Free |
| 9 January 2026 | MF | (Croatia) Hrvoje Babec | (Croatia) NK Osijek | Undisclosed |
| 21 January 2026 | FW | (South Korea) Song Min-kyu | (South Korea) Jeonbuk Hyundai Motors | Free |
| 27 January 2026 | MF | (Spain) Juan Antonio Ros | (China) Tianjin Jinmen Tiger | Free |
Loan Transfer

==== Out ====
Transfers out

| Date | Position | Player | Transferred to | Ref |
Permanent Transfer
| 26 December 2025 | MF | (South Korea) Kang Seong-jin | (South Korea) Suwon Samsung Bluewings | Free |
| 31 December 2025 | GK | (South Korea) Choi Chul-won | (South Korea) Gyeongju KHNP | Free |
| 31 December 2025 | DF | (South Korea) Choi Jun-yeong | (South Korea) Gimhae FC 2008 | Free |
| 31 December 2025 | DF | (South Korea) Jeong Tae-wook | (South Korea) Jeonbuk Hyundai Motors | End of loan |
| 31 December 2025 | MF | (South Korea) Ryu Jae-moon | (South Korea) Daegu FC | Free |
| 31 December 2025 | MF | (South Korea) Her Dong-min | (South Korea) Cheonan City | Free |
| 31 December 2025 | FW | (South Korea) Jung Han-min | (South Korea) Pohang Steelers | Free |
| 31 December 2025 | FW | (England) Jesse Lingard | (Brazil) Corinthians | Free |
| 31 December 2025 | FW | (Croatia) Marko Dugandžić | (Bulgaria) Levski Sofia | Free |
| 8 January 2026 | FW | (South Korea) Son Seung-beom | (South Korea) Pohang Steelers | Free |
| January 2026 | MF | (South Korea) Park Jang Han-gyeol | (South Korea) Hwaseong FC | Free |
Loan Transfer
| 26 December 2025 | MF | (South Korea) Min Ji-hoon | (South Korea) Chungbuk Cheongju | Season loan |
| 26 December 2025 | DF | (South Korea) Bae Hyun-seo | (South Korea) Gyeongnam FC | Season loan |
| 26 December 2025 | DF | (South Korea) Kim Hyeon-deok | (South Korea) Gimhae FC 2008 | Season loan |
| 4 January 2026 | DF | (South Korea) Cho Young-kwang | (South Korea) Jeonnam Dragons | Season loan |
| 7 February 2026 | FW | (Brazil) Lucas Rodrigues | (Brazil) EC Vitória | Season loan |
| 6 March 2026 | DF | (South Korea) Ham Sun-woo | (South Korea) Hwaseong FC | Season loan |

=== Mid-season ===
==== In ====
Transfers in

| Date | Position | Player | Transferred in | Ref |
Permanent Transfer
| 9 July 2026 | FW | (South Korea) Jeong Hyeon-woo | (South Korea) Siheung City FC | Free |
| 10 August 2026 | MF | (South Korea) Kim Min-joon | (South Korea) Seosan Citizen | Free |
| 5 November 2026 | MF | (South Korea) Paik Sang-hoon | (South Korea) Seosan Citizen | Free |
Loan Transfer

==== Out ====
Transfers out

| Date | Position | Player | Transferred to | Ref |
Permanent Transfer
| 25 June 2026 | MF | (Serbia) Aleksandar Palocevic | (Japan) FC Imabari | Free |
| 29 August 2026 | FW | (South Korea) Song Min-kyu | (Portugal) CD Nacional | Free |
Loan Transfer

== Friendly matches ==
Win Draw Loss

=== Tour of Hainan (3 Jan - 4 Feb) ===
| 15 January 2026 1 | (China) Tianjin Jinmen Tiger | 1–1 | FC Seoul | Haikou, China |
| | Shi Yan |

| 22 January 2026 2 | (China) Qingdao West Coast | 0–4 | FC Seoul | Haikou, China |

=== FWD Insurance Chinese New Year Cup ===
| 21 February 2026 1 | Hong Kong National Team | 1–1 (5–4 p) | FC Seoul | Causeway Bay, Hong Kong |
| | | | | Stadium: Hong Kong Stadium |

== Competitions ==
=== K League 1 ===
==== Matches ====
As usual, the league season is played over 38 matches. After 33 league matches between the 12 participating teams, the teams are split into the final round (top 6 teams) and relegation round (bottom 6 teams).

| 28 February 2026 1 | Incheon United | 1–2 | FC Seoul | Incheon |
| | Stefan Mugosa 90+3' (pen.) | Report | Song Min-kyu 47'; Cho Young-wook 73' (yellow card) 51'; Patryk Klimala (yellow card) 9'; Hrvoje Babec (yellow card) 17' (yellow-red card) 79'; Park Seong-hun (yellow card) 90+1' | Stadium: Incheon Football Stadium; Attendance: 18,108; Referee: Lee Dong-jun |

| 15 April 2026 2 (Rescheduled) | Ulsan HD | 1–4 | FC Seoul | Ulsan |
| | Marcao 67'; Choi Seok-Hyun (yellow card) 11' | Report | Leonardo Acevedo 3'; Benji Michel 10' (o.g.); Song Min-kyu 30', 53'; Park Su-il (yellow card) 14'; Juan Antonio Ros (yellow card) 30'; Lee Han-do (yellow card) 70'; Gu Sung-yun (yellow card) 85'; Patryk Klimala (yellow card) 90+4' | Stadium: Ulsan Munsu Football Stadium; Attendance: 6,567; Referee: Shin Yong-jun |

| 15 March 2026 3 | Jeju SK | 1–2 | FC Seoul | Seogwipo |
| | Byung-wook Choi 89'; Yu In-soo (yellow card) 69' | Report | Juan Antonio Ros 47' (yellow card) 54'; Lee Seung-mo 90+4'; Choi Jun (yellow card) 13'; Anderson Oliveira (yellow card) 45'; Yazan Al-Arab (yellow card) 82' | Stadium: Jeju World Cup Stadium; Attendance: 7,518; Referee: Park Byeong-jin |

| 18 March 2026 4 | Pohang Steelers | 0–1 | FC Seoul | Pohang |
| | Jakob Tranziska (yellow card) 20' (yellow-red card); Han Hyeon-seo (yellow card) 67'; Lee Ho-jae (yellow card) 73'; Shin Kwang-Hoon (yellow card) 76'; Juninho Rocha (yellow card) 90+6' | Report | Cho Young-wook 5' | Stadium: Pohang Steel Yard; Attendance: 4,177; Referee: Shin Yong-jun |

| 22 March 2026 5 | FC Seoul | 5–0 | Gwangju | Seoul |
| | Son Jeong-beom 10'; Patryk Klimala 48', 74' (yellow card) 53'; Juan Antonio Ros 60'; Lee Seung-mo 83' | Report | Gong Bae-hyeon (yellow card) 60'; Kim Jin-ho (yellow card) 64'; Park Jeong-in (yellow card) 71' | Stadium: Seoul World Cup Stadium; Attendance: 24,122; Referee: Kim Woo-sung |

| 5 April 2026 6 | FC Anyang | 1–1 | FC Seoul | Anyang |
| | Airton 79'; Choi Geon-Joo (yellow card) 36'; Lee Tae-heui (yellow card) 66'; Kwon Kyung-won (yellow card) 71' | Report | Patryk Klimala (yellow card) 45'; Juan Antonio Ros (yellow card) 67'; Hrvoje Babec (yellow card) 73'; Park Seong-hun (yellow card) 75' | Stadium: Anyang Stadium; Attendance: 11,542; Referee: Song Min-seok |

| 11 April 2026 7 | FC Seoul | 1–0 | Jeonbuk Hyundai Motors | Seoul |
| | Patryk Klimala 90+5' | Report | Kim Tae hwan (yellow card) 83' | Stadium: Seoul World Cup Stadium; Attendance: 34,068; Referee: Park Byeong-jin |

| 18 April 2026 8 | FC Seoul | 0–1 | Daejeon Hana Citizen | Seoul |
| | | Report | Kang Hyun Yoo 17'; Park Kyu-hyun (yellow card) 10'; Cho Sung-gwon (yellow card) 34'; Kim Bong-soo (yellow card) 50'; Kim Min-deok (yellow card) 79' | Stadium: Seoul World Cup Stadium; Attendance: 22,503; Referee: Kim Jong-hyun |

| 21 April 2026 9 | FC Seoul | 3–0 | Bucheon | Seoul |
| | Patryk Klimala 32' (pen.) (yellow card) 45+3'; Moon Seon-min 45+7' (yellow card) 80'; Hwang Do-yun 67' | Report | Baek Dong-kyu (yellow card) 15'; Shin Sung (yellow card) 36'; Jefferson (yellow card) 62'; Lee Jae-won (yellow card) 68' | Stadium: Seoul World Cup Stadium; Attendance: 10,257; Referee: Song Min-seok |

| 25 April 2026 10 | Gangwon | 1–2 | FC Seoul | Gangneung |
| | Abdallah Hleihel 90+10'; Shin Min-ha (yellow card) 30'; Song Jun-seok (red card) 46'; Kang Joon-hyuck (yellow card) 64'; Lee Hyo-Bin (yellow card) 71'; Mo Jae-hyeon (yellow card) 90+11' | Report | Hrvoje Babec 43'; Lee Seung-mo 81'; Son Jeong-beom (red card) 45' | Stadium: Gangneung Stadium; Attendance: 8,259; Referee: Lee Dong-jun |

| 2 May 2026 11 | FC Seoul | 2–3 | Gimcheon Sangmu | Seoul |
| | Yazan Arab 37'; Hrvoje Babec 60'; Choi Jun (yellow card) 41'; Kim Jin-su (yellow card) 90+8' | Report | Go Jae-hyeon 30'; Park Tae-joon 70'; Kim In-gyun 80'; Kang Min-geu (yellow card) 35'; Byeon Jun-soo (yellow card) 63'; Lee Jung-taek (yellow card) 90+3' | Stadium: Seoul World Cup Stadium; Attendance: 22,337; Referee: Kim Woo-sung |

| 5 May 2026 12 | FC Seoul | 0–0 | FC Anyang | Seoul |
| | Yazan Al-Arab (red card) 36'; Park Seong-hun (yellow card) 82'; Juan Antonio Ros (yellow card) 84' | Report | Kim Woon (yellow card) 51'; Han Ka-ram (yellow card) 54'; Kim Gang (red card) 81' | Stadium: Seoul World Cup Stadium; Attendance: 35,729; Referee: Seol Tae-hwan |

| 9 May 2026 13 | Jeju SK | 2–1 | FC Seoul | Seogwipo |
| | Park Chang-jun 17'; Kim Jun-Ha 53'; Nam Tae Hee (yellow card) 65'; Emerson (yellow card) 85' | Report | Lenoardo Acevedo 57'; Choi Jun (yellow card) 65' | Stadium: Jeju World Cup Stadium; Attendance: 6,051; Referee: Choi Cheol-jun |

| 12 May 2026 14 | Gwangju | 0–1 | FC Seoul | Gwangju |
| | Kwon Sung-yun (yellow card) 12'; Hong Yong-jun (yellow card) 58'; An Hyeok-joo (yellow card) 78' | Report | Lenoardo Acevedo 49' | Stadium: Gwangju Football Stadium; Attendance: 1,942; Referee: Park Byeong-jin |

| 16 May 2026 15 | Daejeon Hana Citizen | 1–2 | FC Seoul | Daejeon |
| | Jeong Jae-Hee 69'; Lee Hyeon-sik (yellow card) 55'; Anton Krivotsyuk (yellow card) 85'; Kim Min-deok (yellow card) 90' | Report | Anderson Oliveira 23'; Lee Seung-mo 87'; Choi Jun (yellow card) 43'; Yazan Al-Arab (yellow card) 66'; Cho Young-wook (yellow card) 90+5' | Stadium: Daejeon World Cup Stadium; Attendance: 11,687; Referee: Song Min-seok |

| 5 July 2026 16 | FC Seoul | 1–0 | Incheon United | Seoul |
| | Jeong Seung-won 81' (yellow card) 82'; Song Min-kyu (yellow card) 51'; Gu Sung-yun (yellow card) 90+7' | Report | Gerso (yellow card) 74' | Stadium: Seoul World Cup Stadium; Attendance: 22,600; Referee: Shin Yong-jun |

| 12 July 2026 17 | FC Seoul | 0–0 | Gangwon | Seoul |
| | Kim Jin-su (yellow card) 90' | Report | Song Jun-seok (yellow card) 71'; Seo Min-woo (yellow card) 90+7' | Stadium: Seoul World Cup Stadium; Attendance: 17,872; Referee: Seol Tae-hwan |

| 19 July 2026 18 | Bucheon | 1–3 | FC Seoul | Bucheon |
| | Kim Sang-jun 64' (yellow card) 90+8'; Baek Dong Gyu (yellow card) 6'; Sung Ye-geon (yellow card) 18'; Kim Min-jun (yellow card) 29' | Report | Cho Young-wook 43'; Jeong Seung-won 54' (yellow card) 76'; Patryk Klimala 90+12'; Park Su-il (yellow card) 74' | Stadium: Bucheon Stadium; Attendance: 9,218; Referee: Lee Dong-jun |

| 22 July 2026 19 | FC Seoul | 3–1 | Pohang Steelers | Seoul |
| | Patryk Klimala 36'; Jeong Seung-won 69', 88' | Report | Jakob Tranziska 56'; Shin Kwang-hoon (yellow card) 62' | Stadium: Seoul World Cup Stadium; Attendance: 11,139; Referee: Kim Dae-yong |

| 26 July 2026 20 | FC Seoul | 1–3 | Ulsan HD | Seoul |
| | Jeong Seung-won 61'; Patryk Klimala (yellow card) 82' | Report | Erik Farias 5'; Lee Dong-gyeong 13'; Yago Cariello 90+8' (yellow card) 90+9'; Thomas Oude Kotte (yellow card) 57' | Stadium: Seoul World Cup Stadium; Attendance: 24,343; Referee: Seol Tae-hwan |

| 1 August 2026 21 | Jeonbuk Hyundai Motors | 0–0 | FC Seoul | Jeonju |
| | Cho Wi-je (yellow card) 24'; Oberdan (yellow card) 32' | Report | Song Min-kyu (yellow card) 26'; Son Jeong-beom (yellow card) 84' | Stadium: Jeonju World Cup Stadium; Attendance: 23,081; Referee: Kim Jong-hyun |

| 8 August 2026 22 | Gimcheon Sangmu | 0–0 | FC Seoul | Gimcheon |
| | Park Cheol-woo (yellow card) 76' | Report | Kim Jin-su (yellow card) 82' | Stadium: Gimcheon Stadium; Attendance: 2,696; Referee: Park Byung-jin |

| 15 August 2026 23 | FC Seoul | 4–2 | Daejeon Hana Citizen | Seoul |
| | Patryk Klimala 48' (yellow card) 90+5'; Song Min-kyu 81', 83'; Jeong Seung-won 90+3' (yellow card) 42'; Yazan Al-Arab (yellow card) 45+6'; Moon Seon-min (yellow card) 89' | Report | Joo Min-kyu 33'; Kim Jin-su 62' (o.g.); Kang Yoon-seong (yellow card) 41'; Seo Jin-su (yellow card) 66' | Stadium: Seoul World Cup Stadium; Attendance: 21,311; Referee: Kim Woo-sung |

| 22 August 2026 24 | FC Anyang | 0–7 | FC Seoul | Anyang |
| | Choi Geon-ju (yellow card) 72'; Lee Jin-yong (yellow card) 90' | Report | Jeong Seung-won 7', 53' (yellow card) 9'; Hrvoje Babec 13'; Moon Seon-min 31'; Patryk Klimala 35'; Anderson Oliveira 45'; Lee Seung-mo 58'; Song Min-kyu (yellow card) 90'; Kim Jin-su (yellow card) 90+2' | Stadium: Anyang Stadium; Attendance: 8,856; Referee: Kim Dae-yong |

| 25 August 2026 25 | FC Seoul | 1–0 | Bucheon | Seoul |
| | Patryk Klimala 49'; Yazan Al-Arab (yellow card) 8'; Juan Antonio Ros (yellow card) 62' | Report | Sung Ye-geon (yellow card) 35'; Kazuki Takahashi (yellow card) 65'; Rodrigo Bassani (yellow card) 85' | Stadium: Seoul World Cup Stadium; Referee: Seol Tae-hwan |

| 30 August 2026 26 | Gwangju | 2–5 | FC Seoul | Gwangju |
| | Choi Kyoung-rok 33'; Shin Chang-moo 48'; Kim Woo-jin (red card) 41'; Ahn Young-kyu (red card) 56' | Report | Son Jeong-beom 15'; Kim Jin-su 22'; Lee Seung-mo 45+8'; Jeong Seung-won 51'; Anderson Oliveira 60'; Yazan Alarab (yellow card) 69' | Stadium: Gwangju Football Stadium; Attendance: 1,770; Referee: Song Min-seok |

| 5 September 2026 27 | FC Seoul | 1–0 | Incheon United | Seoul |
| | Lee Ju-yong 60' (o.g.) | Report | Kim Gun-hee (red card) 3'; Gerso (yellow card) 89' | Stadium: Seoul World Cup Stadium; Attendance: 28,288; Referee: Ko Hyung-jin |

| 8 September 2026 28 | Ulsan HD | 1–0 | FC Seoul | Ulsan |
| | Sim Sang-min 83' (yellow card) 84'; Jang Si young (yellow card) 40'; Jung Seung-hyeon (yellow card) 69' | Report | | Stadium: Ulsan Munsu Football Stadium; Attendance: 7,753; Referee: Choi Cheol-jun |

| 12 September 2026 29 | Jeonbuk Hyundai Motors | 1–2 | FC Seoul | Jeonju |
| | Bruno Mota 26'; Kim Tae hyeon (yellow card) 38' | Report | Patryk Klimala 3', 90+6' | Stadium: Jeonju World Cup Stadium; Attendance: 18,821; Referee: Lee Dong-jun |

| 20 September 2026 30 | Pohang Steelers | 2–1 | FC Seoul | Sangju |
| | Kento Nishiya 3'; Hwang Seo-woong 39'; Jorge Teixeira (yellow card) 28'; Yazan Al-Arab (yellow card) 45'; Kim Dong-jin (yellow card) 45+2'; Ki Sung-Yueng (yellow card) 63' | Report | Patryk Klimala 51' (pen.); Hong Sung-min (yellow card) 90+7' | Stadium: Sangju Civic Stadium (Note: Location change due to safety inspection of the Pohang Yard Stadium as there was an safety incident during match against Ulsan where the part of the roof drop off and injured a spectator.); Attendance: 4,034; Referee: Song Min-seok |

| 10 October 2026 31 | FC Seoul | 2–1 | Jeju | Seoul |
| | Moon Seon-min 46'; Patryk Klimala 79'; Kim Jin-su (yellow card) 13'; Son Jeong-beom (yellow card) 83' | Report | Lee Gun-hee 72'; Tobias Figueiredo (yellow card) 83' | Stadium: Seoul World Cup Stadium; Attendance: 23,403; Referee: Kim Jong-hyeok |

| 17 October 2026 32 | FC Seoul | 2–2 | Gimcheon Sangmu | Seoul |
| | Patryk Klimala 22', 52'; Kim Jin-su (yellow card) 45'; Son Jeong-beom (yellow card) 50'; Juan Antonio Ros (yellow card) 66'; Hwang Do-yoon (yellow card) 90+4' | Report | Lee Sangheon 45' (pen.); Kim In-gyun 67' (pen.); Yoon Jae-seok (yellow card) 45+6'; Byeon Jun-soo (yellow card) 80' | Stadium: Seoul World Cup Stadium; Attendance: 13,788; Referee: Choi Cheol-jun |

| 24 October 2026 33 | FC Seoul | 1–1 | Gangwon | Seoul |
| | Moon Seon-min 58'; Leonardo Acevedo (yellow card) 40'; Kim Jin-su (yellow card) 90+4' | Report | Kang Joon-hyuck 65' (yellow card) 32'; Kim Dae-won (penalty missed) 45+4; Mun Ki Hwang (yellow card) 90+3' | Stadium: Seoul World Cup Stadium; Attendance: 30,002; Referee: Lee Dong-jun |

| 1 November 2026 34 | FC Seoul | 0–1 | Incheon United | Seoul |
| | | Report | Gerso 90+6'; Juan Ibiza (yellow card) 63' | Stadium: Seoul World Cup Stadium; Attendance: 12,050; Referee: Park Byeong-jin |

| 8 November 2026 35 | FC Seoul | 1–2 | Ulsan HD | Seoul |
| | Lee Han-do 75' | Report | Lee Dong-gyeong 35'; Yago Cariello 90'; Kim Young-gwon (yellow card) 26'; Cho Hyun taek (yellow card) 77' | Stadium: Seoul World Cup Stadium; Attendance: 13,037; Referee: Chae Sang-Hyeop |

| 21 November 2026 36 | Jeonbuk Hyundai Motors | 0–1 | FC Seoul | Jeonju |
| | | Report | Anderson Oliveira 54'; Jeong Hyeon-woo (yellow card) 90+4'; Patryk Klimala (yellow card) 90+6' | Stadium: Jeonju World Cup Stadium; Attendance: 8,411; Referee: Kim Dae-yong |

| 28 November 2026 37 | FC Seoul | – | Daejeon Hana Citizen | Seoul |
| | | Report | | Stadium: Seoul World Cup Stadium |

| 25 April 2026 38 | Gangwon | – | FC Seoul | Gangneung |
| | | Report | | Stadium: Gangneung Stadium |

| Pos | Team | Pld | W | D | L | GF | GA | GD | Pts | Qualification or relegation (Note: Teams played each other three times (33 matches), before the league was split into two groups, the top six and the bottom six.) |
|---|---|---|---|---|---|---|---|---|---|---|
| 1 | FC Seoul (C, Q) | 36 | 21 | 7 | 8 | 63 | 32 | +31 | 70 | Qualification for Champions League Elite league stage |
| 2 | Ulsan HD (T) | 36 | 17 | 6 | 13 | 57 | 51 | +6 | 57 | Qualification for Champions League Elite league stage |
| 3 | Daejeon Hana Citizen (T) | 36 | 15 | 11 | 10 | 58 | 42 | +16 | 56 | Qualification for Champions League Elite league stage |
| 4 | Incheon United | 36 | 14 | 10 | 12 | 46 | 38 | +8 | 52 | Qualification for Champions League Elite play-off round |
| 5 | Gangwon FC | 36 | 12 | 15 | 9 | 45 | 37 | +8 | 51 | |

Updated to match(es) played on 21 November 2026. Source: Soccerway K League
Rules for classification: 1) Points; 2) Goals scored; 3) Goal difference; 4) Wins; 5) Head-to-head points
(C) Champions; (Q) Qualified for the phase indicated; (T) Qualified, but not yet for the particular phase indicated

=== 2026–27 Korea Cup ===
| 29 July 2025 Round 3 | (K2) Busan IPark | 2–0 | FC Seoul | Busan |
| | Antonio Gutemberg 7' (yellow card) 80'; Baek Ga-on 83'; Otabek Akhadov (yellow card) 68'; Gabriel Honório (yellow card) 90+2' | Report | Ahn Jae-min (yellow card) 31' | Stadium: Busan Gudeok Stadium; Attendance: 2,171; Referee: Kim Yong-woo |

=== 2025–26 AFC Champions League Elite ===
Win Draw Loss

==== League stage ====
| 16 September 2025 Matchday 1 | FC Machida Zelvia (Japan) | 1–1 | (South Korea) FC Seoul | Machida, Japan |
| | Henry Hiroki Mochizuki 80' | Report | Marko Dugandžić 59'; Kim Jin-su (yellow card) 82' | Stadium: Machida GION Stadium; Attendance: 4,798; Referee: Asker Nadjafaliev (Uzbekistan) |

| 30 September 2025 Matchday 2 | FC Seoul (South Korea) | 3–0 | (Thailand) Buriram United | Seoul, South Korea |
| | Choi Jun 38'; Jeong Seung-won 45+3'; Lucas Rodrigues 68' (yellow card) 27' | Report | Peter Zulj (yellow card) 61' | Stadium: Seoul World Cup Stadium; Attendance: 6,443; Referee: Abdulrahman Al-Jassim (Qatar) |

| 22 October 2025 Matchday 3 | Shanghai Port (China) | 2–0 | (South Korea) FC Seoul | Shanghai, China |
| | Luis Nlavo 58'; André Luis 89' | Report | Kim Jin-su (yellow card) 26'; Ryu Jae-moon (yellow card) 45' | Stadium: Pudong Football Stadium; Attendance: 39,093; Referee: Abdullah Jamali (Kuwait) |

| 4 November 2025 Matchday 4 | FC Seoul (South Korea) | 0–0 | (China) Chengdu Rongcheng | Seoul, South Korea |
| | Kim Jin-su (yellow card) 77' | Report | Pedro Delgado (yellow card) 85' | Stadium: Seoul World Cup Stadium; Attendance: 6,279; Referee: Nazmi Nasaruddin (Malaysia) |

| 25 November 2025 Matchday 5 | Shanghai Shenhua (China) | 1–3 | (South Korea) FC Seoul | Shanghai, China |
| | Mateus Vital 61'; Lyu Wenjun (yellow card) 30'; Zhang Linpeng (yellow card) 86' | Report | Jesse Lingard 47', 77' (yellow card) 86'; Lucas Silva 67'; Lee Seung-Mo (yellow card) 56' | Stadium: Shanghai Stadium; Attendance: 11,501; Referee: Khaled Al-Hoish (Saudi Arabia) |

| 10 December 2025 Matchday 6 | FC Seoul (South Korea) | 1–1 | (Australia) Melbourne City | Seoul, South Korea |
| | Jesse Lingard 31' (yellow card) 88'; Hwang Do-Yun (yellow card) 15'; Choi Jun (yellow card) 30'; Kim Jin-Su (yellow card) 57'; Yazan Al Arab (yellow card) 77' | Report | Takeshi Kanamori 74'; Elbasan Rashani (yellow card) 46' | Stadium: Seoul World Cup Stadium; Attendance: 8,106; Referee: Mohanad Qasim Eessee Sarray (Iraq) |

| 10 February 2026 Matchday 7 | Vissel Kobe (Japan) | 2–0 | (South Korea) FC Seoul | Kobe, Japan |
| | Yoshinori Muto 69'; Gōtoku Sakai 73'; Yuta Goke (yellow card) 43'; Daiju Sasaki (yellow card) 45+6'; Yuya Kuwasaki (yellow card) 57' | Report | | Stadium: Noevir Stadium Kobe; Attendance: 7,159; Referee: Nazmi Nasaruddin (Malaysia) |

| 17 February 2026 Matchday 8 | FC Seoul (South Korea) | 2–2 | (Japan) Sanfrecce Hiroshima | Mok-dong, South Korea |
| | Patryk Klimala 10' (pen.) (yellow card) 74'; Naoto Arai 27' (pen.); Lee Seung-mo (yellow card) 40'; Gu Sung-Yun (yellow card) 62' | Report | Ryo Germain 90+1'; Kosuke Kinoshita 90+6' | Stadium: Mokdong Stadium (Note: FC Seoul played their home matches at Mokdong Stadium, instead of their regular home stadium Seoul World Cup Stadium, Seoul.); Referee: Khalid Al-Turais (Saudi Arabia) |

| Pos | Team | Pld | W | D | L | GF | GA | GD | Pts | Qualification |
|---|---|---|---|---|---|---|---|---|---|---|
| 5 | (Australia) Melbourne City | 8 | 4 | 2 | 2 | 9 | 7 | +2 | 14 | Advance to round of 16 |
| 6 | (Malaysia) Johor Darul Ta'zim | 8 | 3 | 2 | 3 | 8 | 7 | +1 | 11 | Advance to round of 16 |
| 7 | (South Korea) FC Seoul | 8 | 2 | 4 | 2 | 10 | 9 | +1 | 10 | Advance to round of 16 |
| 8 | (South Korea) Gangwon FC | 8 | 2 | 3 | 3 | 9 | 11 | −2 | 9 | Advance to round of 16 |
| 9 | (South Korea) Ulsan HD | 8 | 2 | 3 | 3 | 6 | 8 | −2 | 9 | |

Source: AFC
Rules for classification: 1) points; 2) goal difference; 3) number of goals scored; 4) number of matches won; 5) penalty shoot-out if only two teams remain tied and played each other on the final matchday 6) fair play ranking; 7) drawing of lots

==== Knockout stage ====
| 4 March 2026 R16 Leg 1 | FC Seoul (South Korea) | 0–1 | (Japan) Vissel Kobe | Seoul, South Korea |
| | Patryk Klimala (yellow card) 11'; Hrvoje Babec (yellow card) 49'; Leonardo Ruiz (penalty missed) 66 | Report | Matheus Thuler 23'; Katsuya Nagato (yellow card) 28'; Yuta Goke (yellow card) 59'; Daiju Sasaki (yellow card) 83' | Stadium: Seoul World Cup Stadium; Attendance: 6,508; Referee: Khaled Al-Hoish (Saudi Arabia) |

| 11 March 2025 R16 Leg 2 | Vissel Kobe (Japan) | 2–1 (3–1 agg.) | (South Korea) FC Seoul | Kobe, Japan |
| | Yuya Osako 78'; Yosuke Ideguchi 89'; Matheus Thuler (yellow card) 23' | Report | Patryk Klimala 20' | Stadium: Noevir Stadium Kobe; Referee: Alireza Faghani (Australia) |

=== 2026–27 AFC Champions League Two ===
| Pos | Team | Pld | W | D | L | GF | GA | GD | Pts | Qualification | SIB | SEO | MVC | TCV |
|---|---|---|---|---|---|---|---|---|---|---|---|---|---|---|
| 1 | (Indonesia) Persib (A) | 4 | 4 | 0 | 0 | 6 | 1 | +5 | 12 | Advance to round of 16 | — | – | 2–0 | 1–0 |
| 2 | (South Korea) FC Seoul | 4 | 2 | 0 | 2 | 8 | 4 | +4 | 6 | Advance to round of 16 | 0–1 | — | – | 3–0 |
| 3 | (Australia) Melbourne Victory | 4 | 1 | 1 | 2 | 5 | 5 | 0 | 4 | | 1–2 | 3–0 | — | – |
| 4 | (Vietnam) Thể Công–Viettel | 4 | 0 | 1 | 3 | 1 | 10 | −9 | 1 | | – | 0–5 | 1–1 | — |

Updated to match(es) played on 4 November 2026. Source: ACL2
Rules for classification: Tiebreakers
(A) Advance to a further round

| 16 September 2026 1 | FC Seoul (South Korea) | 0–1 | (Indonesia) Persib | Seoul, South Korea |
| | Jung Ha-won (yellow card) 63'; Son Jeong-beom (yellow card) 81' | Report | Julio Cesar 5'; Adam Alis (yellow card) 35'; Kakang Rudianto (yellow card) 78' | Stadium: Seoul World Cup Stadium; Attendance: 5,385; Referee: Faisal Al-Balawi (Saudi Arabia) |

| 14 October 2026 2 | Melbourne Victory (Australia) | 3–0 | (South Korea) FC Seoul | Melbourne, Australia |
| | Guillermo May 63'; Clarismario Santos 73'; Jordi Valadon 83' | Report | Ahn Jae-min (yellow card) 70' | Stadium: Melbourne Rectangular Stadium; Attendance: 2,198; Referee: Clifford Daypuyat (Philippines) |

| 28 October 2026 3 | Thể Công–Viettel (Vietnam) | 0–5 | (South Korea) FC Seoul | Hanoi, Vietnam |
| | Nguyễn Đức Hoàng Minh (yellow card) 83' | Report | Moon Seon-min 8'; Anderson Oliveira 21'; Hwang Do-yoon 30'; Cho Young-wook 35'; Leonardo Ruiz 55'; Yazan Al-Arab (yellow card) 18' (yellow-red card) 66' | Stadium: Hàng Đẫy Stadium; Attendance: 6,200; Referee: Yoshimi Yamashita (Japan) |

| 4 November 2026 4 | FC Seoul (South Korea) | 3–0 | (Vietnam) Thể Công–Viettel | Seoul, South Korea |
| | Moon Seon-min 68'; Anderson Oliveira 79'; Lucao 90' (o.g.) | Report | Nguyen Hoang Khanh (yellow card) 73' | Stadium: Seoul World Cup Stadium; Attendance: 3,504; Referee: Ammar Abo Alo (Syria) |

| 25 November 2026 5 | Persib (Indonesia) | – | (South Korea) FC Seoul | Bandung, Indonesia |
| | | Report | | Stadium: Gelora Bandung Lautan Api Stadium |

| 2 December 2026 6 | FC Seoul (South Korea) | – | (Australia) Melbourne Victory | Seoul, South Korea |
| | | Report | | Stadium: Seoul World Cup Stadium |

== Team statistics ==
=== Appearances and goals ===
As of 21 November 2026

| No. | Pos. | Player | K-League | | Korea Cup | | 2025–26 AFC Champions League | | 2026–27 AFC Champions League Two | | Total | |
| No. | Pos. | Player | Apps | Goals | Apps | Goals | Apps | Goals | Apps | Goals | Apps | Goals |
|---|---|---|---|---|---|---|---|---|---|---|---|---|
| 1 | GK | (South Korea) Im Joon-seob | 0 | 0 | 0+1 | 0 | 0 | 0 | 1 | 0 | 2 | 0 |
| 4 | DF | (South Korea) Lee Sang-min | 4 | 0 | 0 | 0 | 0 | 0 | 3 | 0 | 7 | 0 |
| 5 | DF | (Jordan) Yazan Al-Arab | 29+2 | 1 | 0 | 0 | 1 | 0 | 1+1 | 0 | 34 | 1 |
| 6 | MF | (Croatia) Hrvoje Babec | 33+1 | 2 | 0 | 0 | 4 | 0 | 2 | 0 | 40 | 2 |
| 7 | MF | (South Korea) Jeong Seung-won | 32+5 | 9 | 0 | 0 | 3 | 0 | 0 | 0 | 40 | 9 |
| 8 | MF | (South Korea) Lee Seung-mo | 15+16 | 5 | 1 | 0 | 2+1 | 0 | 0 | 0 | 35 | 5 |
| 9 | FW | (Poland) Patryk Klimala | 27+5 | 15 | 0 | 0 | 3+1 | 2 | 0+2 | 0 | 38 | 17 |
| 10 | FW | (Brazil) Anderson Oliveira | 27+3 | 4 | 0+1 | 0 | 2+2 | 0 | 2 | 2 | 37 | 6 |
| 11 | FW | (Brazil) Leonardo Acevedo | 10+3 | 3 | 0 | 0 | 1+2 | 0 | 4 | 1 | 20 | 4 |
| 14 | MF | (South Korea) Jeong Hyeon-woo | 1+4 | 0 | 1 | 0 | 0 | 0 | 2+2 | 0 | 10 | 0 |
| 16 | DF | (South Korea) Choi Jun | 31+4 | 0 | 0+1 | 0 | 4 | 0 | 0+2 | 0 | 42 | 0 |
| 17 | DF | (South Korea) Ahn Jae-min | 0 | 0 | 1 | 0 | 0 | 0 | 2 | 0 | 3 | 0 |
| 18 | FW | (South Korea) Cho Young-wook | 11+12 | 3 | 0+1 | 0 | 3+1 | 0 | 2 | 1 | 30 | 4 |
| 19 | FW | (South Korea) Cheon Seong-hoon | 0+3 | 0 | 1 | 0 | 0+1 | 0 | 2+1 | 0 | 8 | 0 |
| 20 | DF | (South Korea) Lee Han-do | 0+12 | 1 | 1 | 0 | 2 | 0 | 2 | 0 | 17 | 1 |
| 21 | MF | (South Korea) Jung Ha-won | 0+1 | 0 | 0 | 0 | 0 | 0 | 0+2 | 0 | 3 | 0 |
| 22 | DF | (South Korea) Kim Jin-su | 31+2 | 1 | 0 | 0 | 4 | 0 | 2 | 0 | 39 | 1 |
| 23 | MF | (South Korea) Ko Pil-kwan | 0 | 0 | 0 | 0 | 0 | 0 | 1+1 | 0 | 2 | 0 |
| 24 | MF | (South Korea) Kim Min-joon | 0 | 0 | 0 | 0 | 0 | 0 | 2 | 0 | 2 | 0 |
| 25 | GK | (South Korea) Gu Sung-yun | 36 | 0 | 0 | 0 | 4 | 0 | 0 | 0 | 40 | 0 |
| 26 | GK | (South Korea) Baek Jong-bum | 0 | 0 | 0 | 0 | 0 | 0 | 2 | 0 | 2 | 0 |
| 27 | FW | (South Korea) Moon Seon-min | 14+19 | 4 | 0+1 | 0 | 0+4 | 0 | 2+1 | 2 | 41 | 6 |
| 31 | GK | (South Korea) Kang Hyeon-mu | 0 | 0 | 1 | 0 | 0 | 0 | 1 | 0 | 2 | 0 |
| 36 | DF | (South Korea) Kim Ji-Won | 0 | 0 | 0 | 0 | 0 | 0 | 0 | 0 | 0 | 0 |
| 37 | DF | (Spain) Juan Antonio Ros | 33 | 2 | 0 | 0 | 3 | 0 | 2 | 0 | 38 | 2 |
| 40 | DF | (South Korea) Park Seong-hoon | 6+6 | 0 | 1 | 0 | 2+2 | 0 | 0+3 | 0 | 20 | 0 |
| 41 | MF | (South Korea) Hwang Do-yoon | 6+12 | 1 | 1 | 0 | 0+2 | 0 | 2+1 | 1 | 24 | 2 |
| 42 | MF | (South Korea) Son Jeong-beom | 22+10 | 1 | 0+1 | 0 | 2 | 0 | 0+2 | 0 | 37 | 1 |
| 44 | DF | (South Korea) Ham Sun-woo | 0 | 0 | 0 | 0 | 0 | 0 | 0 | 0 | 0 | 0 |
| 47 | FW | (South Korea) Jeong Hyeon-Ung | 0 | 0 | 0 | 0 | 0 | 0 | 0+2 | 0 | 2 | 0 |
| 66 | DF | (South Korea) Park Soo-il | 10+3 | 0 | 1 | 0 | 0 | 0 | 3 | 0 | 16 | 0 |
| 71 | GK | (South Korea) Yun Ki-wook | 0 | 0 | 0 | 0 | 0 | 0 | 0 | 0 | 0 | 0 |
| 73 | DF | (South Korea) Shin Ji-seop | 0 | 0 | 0 | 0 | 0 | 0 | 1+1 | 0 | 2 | 0 |
| 88 | MF | (South Korea) Park Jang Han-gyeol | 0+1 | 0 | 1 | 0 | 0 | 0 | 2 | 0 | 4 | 0 |
| 99 | MF | (Ivory Coast) Gbato Seloh Samuel | 0 | 0 | 1 | 0 | 0 | 0 | 1 | 0 | 2 | 0 |
Players featured on a match for the team, but left the club on loan transfer
| 34 | MF | (South Korea) Song Min-kyu | 17+8 | 5 | 0 | 0 | 4 | 0 | 0 | 0 | 29 | 5 |
