= Kim Min-hyeok =

Kim Min-hyeok, Kim Min-hyuk or Kim Min-hyŏk may refer to:

- Kim Min-hyeok (footballer, born February 1992)
- Kim Min-hyeok (footballer, born August 1992)
- Kim Min-hyeok (outfielder) (born 1995), South Korean baseball player
- Kim Min-hyeok (infielder) (born 1996), South Korean baseball player
