= Choi Young-jun =

Choi Young-jun is the name of:

- Choi Young-jun (footballer, born 1965), South Korean footballer
- Choi Young-jun (footballer, born 1991), South Korean footballer
- Choi Young-joon (born 1980), South Korean actor
