= Cho Sung-hoon =

Cho Sung-hoon may refer to:

- Cho Sung-hoon (skier)
- Cho Sung-hoon (footballer)
