= Kang Hyeon-mu =

South Korean footballer (born 1995)

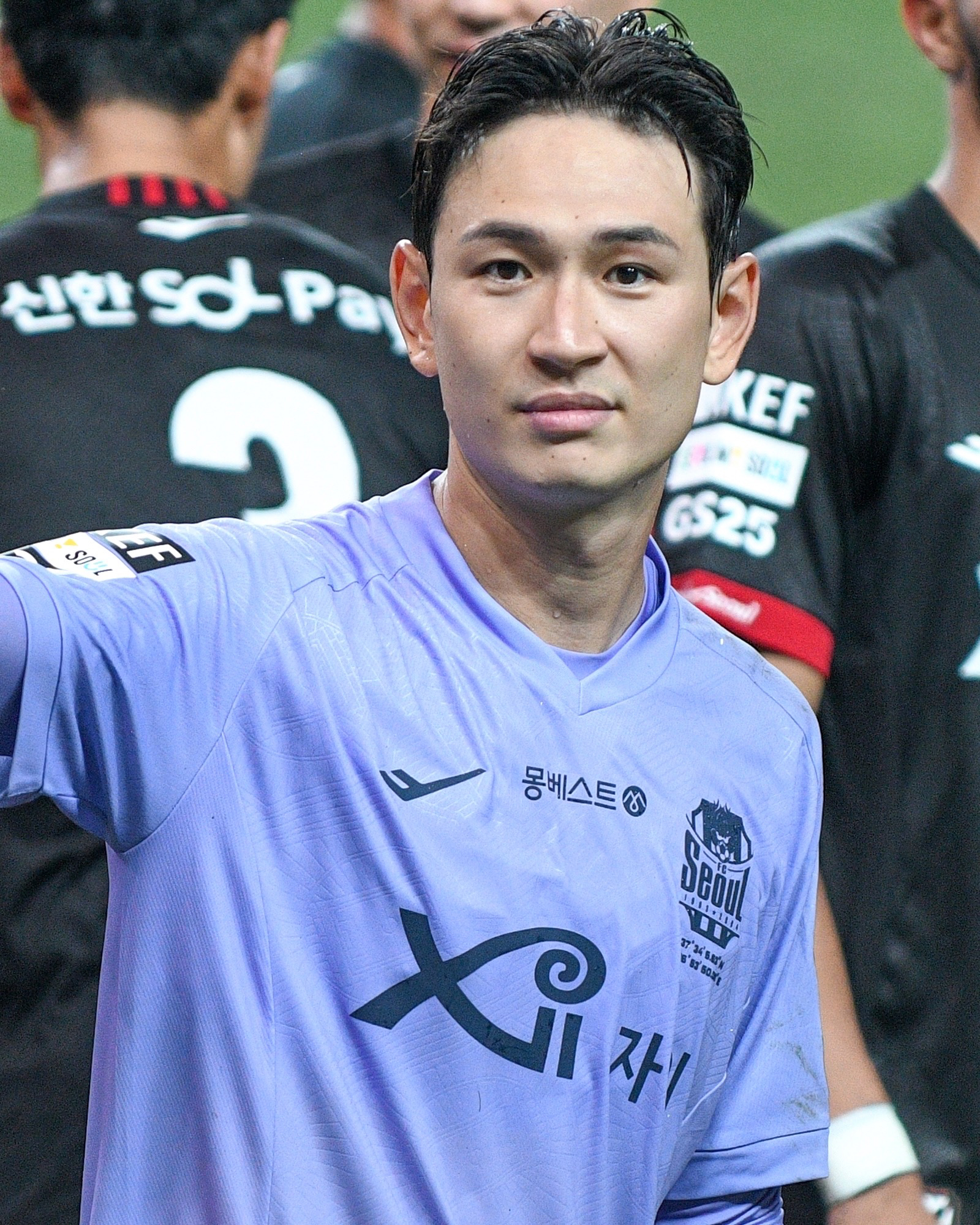
- Kang in 2024

Personal information
- Date of birth: 13 March 1995 (age 31)
- Place of birth: Busan, South Korea
- Height: 1.85 m (6 ft 1 in)
- Position: Goalkeeper

Team information
- Current team: FC Seoul
- Number: 31

Youth career
- 2011–2013: Pohang Steelers

Senior career*
Years	Team	Apps	(Gls)
2014–2024	Pohang Steelers	161	(0)
2023–2024	→ Gimcheon Sangmu (army)	13	(0)
2024–	FC Seoul	44	(0)
- * Club domestic league appearances and goals as of 5 January 2026

- Kang Hyeon-mu
- Hangul: 강현무
- Hanja: 姜賢茂
- RR: Gang Hyeonmu
- MR: Kang Hyŏnmu

Kang Hyeon-mu (Korean: 강현무; born 13 March 1995) is a South Korean professional footballer who plays as goalkeeper for K League 1 club FC Seoul.

== Career ==
Kang Hyeon-mu was promoted to the first team of Pohang Steelers in January 2014. He made his professional debut on 12 March 2017.

On 1st August 2024, he joined FC Seoul.

== Career statistics ==
As of match played 16 September 2026

Appearances and goals by club, season and competition
Club	Season	League			Korea Cup		Continental		Other		Total	
Club	Season	Division	Apps	Goals	Apps	Goals	Apps	Goals	Apps	Goals	Apps	Goals
Pohang Steelers	2015	K League 1	0	0	0	0	—		—		0	0
Pohang Steelers	2016	K League 1	0	0	0	0	0	0	—		0	0
Pohang Steelers	2017	K League 1	26	0	1	0	—		—		27	0
Pohang Steelers	2018	K League 1	38	0	0	0	—		—		38	0
Pohang Steelers	2019	K League 1	23	0	1	0	—		—		24	0
Pohang Steelers	2020	K League 1	27	0	3	0	—		—		30	0
Pohang Steelers	2021	K League 1	27	0	2	0	7 (Note: Appearances in AFC Champions League Elite)	0	—		36	0
Pohang Steelers	2022	K League 1	20	0	1	0	—		—		21	0
Pohang Steelers	Total		161	0	8	0	7	0	—		176	0
Gimcheon Sangmu (army)	2023	K League 2	9	0	0	0	—		—		9	0
Gimcheon Sangmu (army)	2024	K League 1	4	0	0	0	—		—		4	0
Gimcheon Sangmu (army)	Total		13	0	0	0	—		—		13	0
FC Seoul	2024	K League 1	13	0	0	0	—		—		13	0
FC Seoul	2025	K League 1	31	0	2	0	3	0	—		36	0
FC Seoul	2026	K League 1	0	0	0	0	1 (Note: Appearance in AFC Champions League Two)	0	—		1	0
FC Seoul	Total		44	0	2	0	4	0	—		50	0
Career total			218	0	10	0	11	0	0	0	239	0
