= Lee Gwang-hyeok =

South Korean footballer (born 1995)

Personal information
- Date of birth: 11 September 1995 (age 31)
- Place of birth: Daegu, South Korea
- Height: 1.69 m (5 ft 6 1/2 in)
- Position: Winger

Team information
- Current team: Suwon FC
- Number: 22

Youth career
- 2008–2010: Pohang Steelers U-15
- 2011–2013: Pohang Steelers U-18

Senior career*
Years	Team	Apps	(Gls)
2014–2023	Pohang Steelers	141	(7)
2023–	Suwon FC	30	(2)

International career
2013–2014	South Korea U-20		
2015–	South Korea U-23		
- * Club domestic league appearances and goals as of 16 September 2023

Lee Gwang-hyeok (Korean: 이광혁; born 11 September 1995) is a South Korean footballer who plays as winger for Suwon FC. His brother Lee Gwang-hoon is also a footballer.

== Career ==
He joined Pohang Steelers before 2014 season starts.

== Career statistics ==
=== Club ===
As of match played on 29 June 2020

Club			K-League		FA Cup		Champions League		Total	
Club	Season	Division	Apps	Goals	Apps	Goals	Apps	Goals	Apps	Goals
Pohang Steelers	2014	K League Classic	2(7)	0	1	0	0(2)	0	3(9)	0
Pohang Steelers	2015	K League Classic	8(11)	2	2	0	0	0	10(11)	2
Pohang Steelers	2016	K League Classic	9(3)	0	1	0	2(2)	0	12(5)	0
Pohang Steelers	2017	K League Classic	14(17)	1	0	0	0	0	14(17)	1
Pohang Steelers	2018	K League Classic	6(10)	1	0	0	0	0	6(10)	1
Pohang Steelers	2019	K League 1	7(14)	2	0(1)	0	0	0	7(15)	2
Pohang Steelers	2020	K League 1	1(7)	0	0	0	0	0	1(7)	0
Career total			116	6	5	0	6	0	128	6
