= Kim Sang-won (judge) =

South Korean lawyer and judge (1933–2024)

Associate Justice of the Supreme Court of Korea
- In office July 11, 1988 – July 10, 1994

Personal details
- Born: April 30, 1933 Japanese Korea
- Died: February 24, 2024 (aged 90)
- Occupation: Lawyer; Judge

Korean name
- Hangul: 김상원
- Hanja: 金祥源
- RR: Gim Sangwon
- MR: Kim Sangwŏn

Kim Sang-won (Korean: 김상원; April 30, 1933 – February 24, 2024) was a South Korean lawyer and judge. He served as a Justice of the Supreme Court of Korea from 1988 to 1994.

== Biography ==
Kim Sang-won was born in 1933. In 1956, Kim graduated from Seoul National University's College of Agriculture. In 1957, he passed the bar exam.

In 1960, Kim Sang-won first began his career as a judge of the Daegu District Court. in 1975, Kim became the Chief Justice of the Seoul High Court. In 1981, the Chun Doo-hwan government refused Kim's reappointment as a judge, so Kim decided to practice law. In 1988, under the new Roh Tae-woo government, Kim Sang-won was appointed to the Supreme Court, on the recommendation of Chief Justice Lee Il-kyu. Kim served on the court until July 10, 1994.

After retiring from the Supreme Court, Kim established a law firm, Hannuri Law LLC, with his two sons, who were both lawyers, in September 1997. In 2000, he became the chairman of the Ilga Foundation.

Kim died on February 24, 2024, at the age of 90.
