= Kim Kyu-pyo =

South Korean footballer (born 1999)

Personal information
- Date of birth: 8 February 1999 (age 27)
- Place of birth: South Korea
- Height: 1.74 m (5 ft 9 in)
- Position: Midfielder

Team information
- Current team: Hwaseong FC
- Number: 24

Youth career
- –2007: Neunggok Elementary School
- 2008–2009: Jeonnam Dragons
- 2010: Neunggok Elementary School
- 2011–2013: Neunggok Middle School
- 2014–2016: Pohang Steelers
- 2017–2018: Sungkyunkwan University
- 2019–2020: Pohang Steelers

Senior career*
Years	Team	Apps	(Gls)
2020–2021	Pohang Steelers	0	(0)
2020	→ Gyeongnam (loan)	8	(0)
2022-	Hwaseong FC	9	(0)
- * Club domestic league appearances and goals as of 16:55, 22 October 2022 (AEST)

- Kim Kyu-pyo
- Hangul: 김규표
- RR: Gim Gyupyo
- MR: Kim Kyup'yo

Kim Kyu-pyo (Korean: 김규표; born 8 February 1999) is a South Korean footballer currently playing as a midfielder for Hwaseong FC in the K3 League.

== Career statistics ==
=== Club ===
As of 28 August 2021.

Club	Season	League			Cup		Continental		Other		Total	
Club	Season	Division	Apps	Goals	Apps	Goals	Apps	Goals	Apps	Goals	Apps	Goals
Pohang Steelers	2020	K League 1	0	0	0	0	0	0	0	0	0	0
Pohang Steelers	2021	K League 1	0	0	0	0	0	0	0	0	0	0
Pohang Steelers	Total		0	0	0	0	0	0	0	0	0	0
Gyeongnam (loan)	2020	K League 2	8	0	2	0	–		0	0	10	0
Career total			8	0	2	0	0	0	0	0	10	0
