= Manuel Palacios =

Colombian footballer (born 1993)

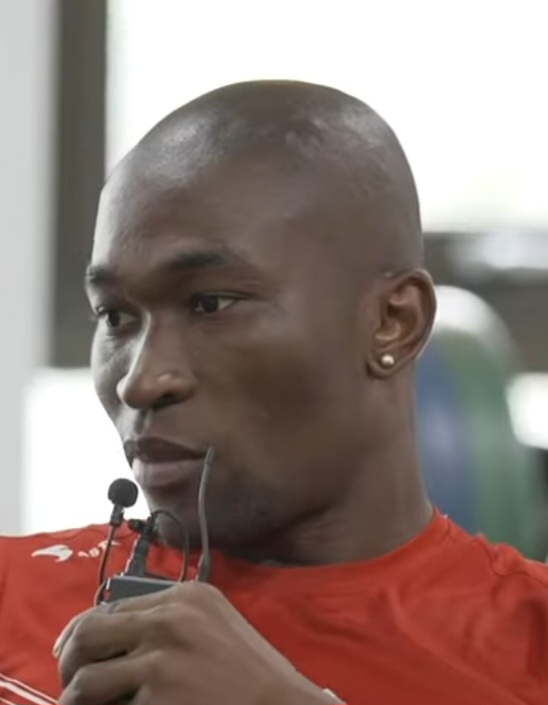

Personal information
- Full name: Manuel Emilio Palacios Murillo
- Date of birth: 13 February 1993 (age 33)
- Place of birth: Quibdó, Colombia
- Height: 1.80 m (5 ft 11 in)
- Position: Midfielder

Team information
- Current team: Jiangxi Dingnan United

Youth career
- 2012: Patriotas

Senior career*
| Years | Team | Apps | (Gls) |
| 2012–2014 | Patriotas | 47 | (2) |
| 2014–2016 | Atlético CP | 53 | (9) |
| 2016–2017 | Real | 27 | (2) |
| 2017–2018 | Alianza Petrolera | 46 | (5) |
| 2019 | Atlético Huila | 0 | (0) |
| 2019 | → FC Anyang (loan) | 34 | (11) |
| 2020–2022 | Pohang Steelers | 52 | (7) |
| 2022 | Seongnam FC | 29 | (3) |
| 2023–2024 | Chengdu Rongcheng | 43 | (10) |
| 2025 | Wuhan Three Towns | 30 | (3) |
| 2026– | Jiangxi Dingnan United | 0 | (0) |
- * Club domestic league appearances and goals as of 22 November 2025

Manuel Emilio Palacios Murillo (born 13 February 1993) is a Colombian professional footballer who plays as a midfielder for China League One club Jiangxi Dingnan United.

== Career ==
Born in Quibdó, Palacios started competing at Patriotas F.C., in the Colombian first tier. After nearly fifty league appearances in two seasons, the 21-year-old made his first move abroad, and joined Atlético CP, in the Portuguese Segunda Liga, on 19 July 2014, as a free player.

He made his debut on 31 August 2014 against C.D. Trofense, adding over thirty caps throughout his first season, seeing the club relegated.

In 2019, Palacios joined FC Anyang in the Korean K League 2 on loan from Atlético Huila. After a great season at FC Anyang, Palacio was transferred to K League 1 giants Pohang Steelers for the 2020–2021 season.

In 2022 March, after playing for 1 match and scoring 1 goal for Pohang Steelers, he moved to Seongnam FC.

On 8 April 2023, Palacios joined Chinese Super League club Chengdu Rongcheng.

On 17 February 2025, Palacios joined another Chinese Super League club Wuhan Three Towns. On 6 January 2026, the club announced his departure after the 2025 season.

On 15 February 2026, Palacios joined China League One club Jiangxi Dingnan United.

== Career statistics ==
As of match played 22 November 2025

Appearances and goals by club, season and competition
| Club | Season | League | | | National cup | | League cup | | Continental | | Other | | Total | |
| Club | Season | Division | Apps | Goals | Apps | Goals | Apps | Goals | Apps | Goals | Apps | Goals | Apps | Goals |
|---|---|---|---|---|---|---|---|---|---|---|---|---|---|---|
| Patriotas | 2012 | Categoría Primera A | 14 | 0 | 6 | 3 | — | | — | | — | | 20 | 3 |
| Patriotas | 2013 | Categoría Primera A | 26 | 1 | 7 | 0 | — | | — | | — | | 33 | 1 |
| Patriotas | 2014 | Categoría Primera A | 7 | 1 | 0 | 0 | — | | — | | — | | 7 | 1 |
| Patriotas | Total | | 47 | 2 | 13 | 3 | — | | — | | — | | 60 | 5 |
| Atlético CP | 2014–15 | LigaPro | 34 | 6 | 2 | 1 | 0 | 0 | — | | — | | 36 | 7 |
| Atlético CP | 2015–16 | LigaPro | 19 | 3 | 0 | 0 | 0 | 0 | — | | — | | 19 | 3 |
| Atlético CP | Total | | 53 | 9 | 2 | 1 | 0 | 0 | — | | — | | 55 | 10 |
| Real | 2016–17 | Campeonato de Portugal | 27 | 2 | 2 | 0 | — | | — | | — | | 29 | 2 |
| Alianza Petrolera | 2017 | Categoría Primera A | 15 | 1 | 2 | 0 | — | | — | | — | | 17 | 1 |
| Alianza Petrolera | 2018 | Categoría Primera A | 31 | 4 | 2 | 0 | — | | — | | — | | 33 | 4 |
| Alianza Petrolera | Total | | 46 | 5 | 4 | 0 | — | | — | | — | | 50 | 5 |
| FC Anyang (loan) | 2019 | K League 2 | 23 | 8 | 3 | 2 | — | | — | | — | | 26 | 10 |
| FC Anyang | 2019 | K League 2 | 11 | 3 | 0 | 0 | — | | — | | — | | 11 | 3 |
| Pohang Steelers | 2020 | K League 1 | 25 | 5 | 4 | 0 | — | | — | | — | | 29 | 5 |
| Pohang Steelers | 2021 | K League 1 | 26 | 1 | 2 | 0 | — | | 5 | 0 | — | | 33 | 1 |
| Pohang Steelers | 2022 | K League 1 | 1 | 1 | 0 | 0 | — | | — | | — | | 1 | 1 |
| Pohang Steelers | Total | | 52 | 7 | 6 | 0 | — | | 5 | 0 | — | | 63 | 7 |
| Seongnam FC | 2022 | K League 1 | 29 | 3 | 1 | 0 | — | | — | | — | | 30 | 3 |
| Chengdu Rongcheng | 2023 | Chinese Super League | 28 | 4 | 0 | 0 | — | | — | | — | | 28 | 4 |
| Chengdu Rongcheng | 2024 | Chinese Super League | 15 | 7 | 3 | 0 | — | | — | | — | | 18 | 7 |
| Chengdu Rongcheng | Total | | 43 | 11 | 3 | 0 | — | | — | | — | | 46 | 11 |
| Wuhan Three Towns | 2025 | Chinese Super League | 30 | 3 | 0 | 0 | — | | — | | — | | 30 | 3 |
| Career total | | | 361 | 53 | 34 | 6 | 0 | 0 | 5 | 0 | 0 | 0 | 400 | 59 |
