= Ha Chang-rae =

South Korean footballer (born 1994)

Ha Chang-rae 하창래
- Ha in 2026

Personal information
- Full name: Ha Chang-rae
- Date of birth: 16 October 1994 (age 32)
- Place of birth: South Korea
- Height: 1.88 m (6 ft 2 in)
- Position: Centre-back

Team information
- Current team: Daejeon Hana Citizen
- Number: 45

Youth career
- 2010–2012: Chung-Ang University High School

College career
Years	Team	Apps	(Gls)
2013–2016	Chung-Ang University		

Senior career*
Years	Team	Apps	(Gls)
2017	Incheon United	20	(1)
2018–2023	Pohang Steelers	124	(6)
2021–2022	→ Gimcheon Sangmu (draft)	20	(0)
2024–	Nagoya Grampus	24	(3)
2025	→ Daejeon Hana Citizen (loan)	24	(0)
2026–	Daejeon Hana Citizen	9	(2)
- * Club domestic league appearances and goals as of 3 August 2026

- Ha Chang-rae
- Hangul: 하창래
- Hanja: 河昌来
- RR: Ha Changrae
- MR: Ha Ch'angnae

Ha Chang-rae (Korean: 하창래; born 16 October 1994) is a South Korean footballer who plays as centre-back for Daejeon Hana Citizen.

== Club career ==
=== Incheon United ===
Ha played college football for Chung-Ang University before signing for K League 1 side Incheon United on 6 January 2017. He make his professional career debut on 24 August in 2–1 win against Ulsan Hyundai. On 23 September, he scored his first career goal in a 1–1 draw against Suwon Samsung Bluewings.

=== Pohang Steelers ===
In January 2018, Ha signed for Pohang Steelers. He make his club debut in a 3–0 win over Daegu FC on 3 March. In the next match against Jeonnam Dragons, he scored the first goal in the match where Pohang Steelers went on to win 3–2.

==== Gimcheon Sangmu (loan) ====
On 8 March 2021, Ha joined K League 2 club Gimcheon Sangmu on loan. He make his debut in the 2021 Korean FA Cup on 28 March where he scored a goal in an 8–0 win over K3 League side Pyeongtaek Citizen. In his first season, he helped the club to win the 2021 K League 2 thus gaining promotion to the K League 1.

Ha than returned to Pohang Steelers on 7 September 2022. On 4 November 2023, Ha helped the club to win the 2023 Korean FA Cup after a 4–2 over Jeonbuk Hyundai Motors. On 29 November 2023, Ha scored his first AFC Champions League goal against Vietnamese club Hanoi FC in 2–0 win.

=== Nagoya Grampus ===
On 10 January 2024, Ha signed with J1 League club Nagoya Grampus ahead of the 2024 season. He make his debut in a 1–0 loss against Machida Zelvia on 2 March. He then put up a 'Man of the Match' performances where he provided an assist and scoring a goal in a 2–0 win over Kashiwa Reysol on 16 March.

== International career ==
His performances with Nagoya Grampus in the 2024 J1 League season earned him a call-up to the South Korea national team by caretaker Kim Do-hoon in June 2024 ahead of the 2026 FIFA World Cup qualification match.

== Club statistics ==
As of 27 May 2025.

Club	Season	League			Cup		League Cup		Continental		Total	
Club	Season	Division	Apps	Goals	Apps	Goals	Apps	Goals	Apps	Goals	Apps	Goals
Incheon United	2017	K League 1	20	1	1	0	—		—		21	1
Pohang Steelers	2018	K League 1	28	1	0	0	—		—		28	1
Pohang Steelers	2019	K League 1	31	1	0	0	—		—		31	1
Pohang Steelers	2020	K League 1	26	1	4	0	—		—		30	1
Pohang Steelers	2021	K League 1	2	1	0	0	—		—		2	1
Gimcheon Sangmu (draft)	2021	K League 2	8	0	1	1	—		—		9	1
Gimcheon Sangmu (draft)	2022	K League 1	12	0	2	0	—		—		14	0
Pohang Steelers	2022	K League 1	8	0	0	0	—		—		8	0
Pohang Steelers	2023	K League 1	29	2	4	1	—		5 (Note: Appearances in AFC Champions League)	1	38	4
Nagoya Grampus	2024	J1 League	24	3	1	0	2	0	—		27	3
Daejeon Hana Citizen (loan)	2025	K League 1	12	0	1	0	—		—		13	0
Career total			200	10	14	2	2	0	5	1	221	13

== Honours ==
Gimcheon Sangmu

- K League 2: 2021

Pohang Steelers

- Korean FA Cup: 2023

Nagoya Grampus

- J.League Cup: 2024
