= Lee Ji-yong =

South Korean footballer (born 1999)

Personal information
- Date of birth: 1 April 1999 (age 27)
- Place of birth: South Korea
- Height: 1.75 m (5 ft 9 in)
- Position: Right winger

Youth career
- 2012–2017: Pohang Steelers
- 2018–2019: Soongsil University

Senior career*
Years	Team	Apps	(Gls)
2020–2023	Pohang Steelers	0	(0)
2023	Sri Pahang	0	(0)

International career
2014	South Korea U17	3	(3)
- * Club domestic league appearances and goals as of 9 July 2023

Lee Ji-yong (born 1 April 1999) is a South Korean professional footballer who plays as a winger.

== Career ==
As a youth player, Lee joined the youth academy of Pohang Steelers. After that, he played for Soongsil University in the university league.

Before the 2023 season, he signed for Malaysia Super League team Sri Pahang.
