= Park Jae-woo =

South Korean footballer (born 1998)

Personal information
- Date of birth: 6 March 1998 (age 28)
- Place of birth: Jinju, Gyeongsangnam-do, South Korea
- Height: 1.74 m (5 ft 9 in)
- Position: Right-back

Youth career
- 2006–2011: Bongnae Elementary School
- 2012–2017: Pohang Steelers
- 2018: Sungkyunkwan University

Senior career*
Years	Team	Apps	(Gls)
2019–2021	Pohang Steelers	12	(0)
2022	Gimpo FC	9	(1)
2023–2025	Gimpo FC	0	(0)
2024–2025	→ Jinju Citizen FC (loan)	40	(0)
- * Club domestic league appearances and goals as of 6 January 2026

- Park Jae-woo
- Hangul: 박재우
- RR: Bak Jaeu
- MR: Pak Chaeu

Park Jae-woo (Korean: 박재우; born 6 March 1998) is a South Korean footballer currently playing as a right-back.

== Career statistics ==
=== Club ===
As of 28 August 2021.

Club	Season	League			Cup		Continental		Other		Total	
Club	Season	Division	Apps	Goals	Apps	Goals	Apps	Goals	Apps	Goals	Apps	Goals
Pohang Steelers	2019	K League 1	2	0	0	0	0	0	0	0	2	0
Pohang Steelers	2020	K League 1	8	0	3	0	0	0	0	0	11	0
Pohang Steelers	2021	K League 1	2	0	0	0	1 (Note: Appearances in the AFC Champions League)	0	0	0	3	0
Career total			12	0	3	0	1	0	0	0	16	0
