= Kim Min-hyeok (infielder) =

South Korean baseball player (born 1996)

Doosan Bears – No. 10
- First baseman
- Born: 3 May 1996 (age 30); Gwangju, South Korea
- Bats: Right Throws: Right

KBO debut
- May 20, 2017, for the Doosan Bears

KBO statistics (through 2025)
- Batting average: .219
- Home runs: 9
- Runs batted in: 34
- Stats at Baseball Reference

Teams
- Doosan Bears (2017–2018, 2021–present)

Kim Min-hyeok (Korean: 김민혁; born 3 May 1996) is a South Korean professional baseball infielder who is currently playing for the Doosan Bears of the KBO League. His major position is first baseman and third baseman. He graduated from Gwangju Dongsung High School. Kim was selected 16th overall by the Doosan Bears in the 2015 KBO second draft (second round).
