= Kim Sang-won (footballer) =

South Korean footballer (born 1992)

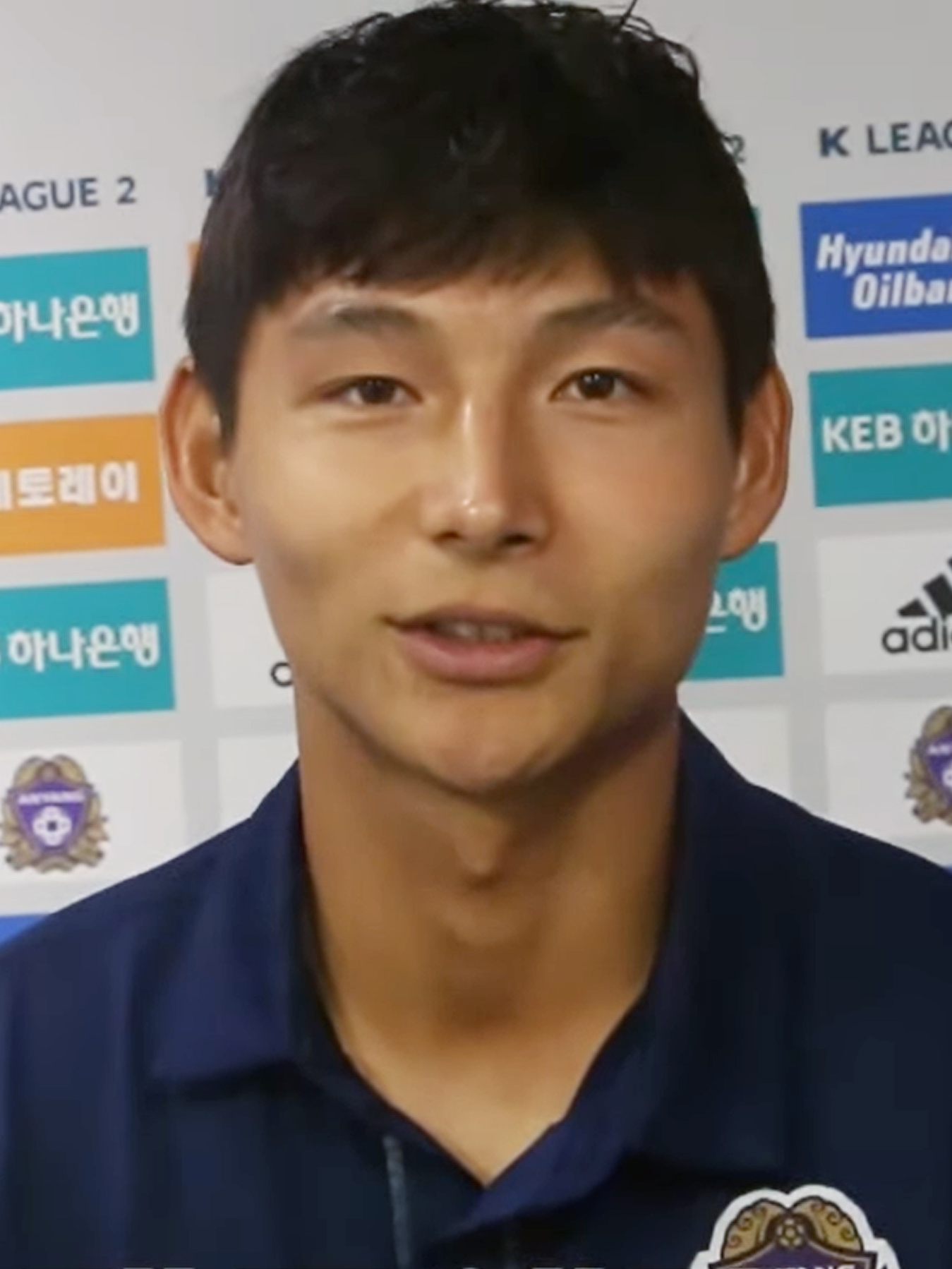
- Kim with FC Anyang in 2019

Personal information
- Full name: Kim Sang-won
- Date of birth: 20 February 1992 (age 34)
- Place of birth: Jeju, South Korea
- Height: 1.76 m (5 ft 9 1/2 in)
- Position: Full-back

Team information
- Current team: Suwon FC
- Number: 3

Youth career
- 2008–2010: Jeju United
- 2011–2013: University of Ulsan

Senior career*
Years	Team	Apps	(Gls)
2014–2018	Jeju United	45	(3)
2017	→ Gwangju FC (loan)	5	(0)
2019	FC Anyang	32	(6)
2020	Pohang Steelers	11	(0)
2021-	Suwon FC	41	(0)
- * Club domestic league appearances and goals as of 13 December 2020

Kim Sang-won (Korean: 김상원; born 20 February 1992) is a South Korean footballer who plays as defender for Suwon FC.

== Career ==
He was selected by Jeju United in the 2014 K League draft.
