= Lee Seung-mo =

South Korean footballer (born 1998)

- Lee in 2026

Personal information
- Full name: Lee Seung-mo
- Date of birth: 30 March 1998 (age 28)
- Place of birth: Paju, Gyeonggi-do, South Korea
- Height: 1.86 m (6 ft 1 in)
- Positions: Midfielder; forward

Team information
- Current team: FC Seoul
- Number: 8

Youth career
- 2014–2016: Pohang Jecheol High School

Senior career*
Years	Team	Apps	(Gls)
2017–2023	Pohang Steelers	97	(4)
2018	→ Gwangju FC (loan)	10	(1)
2023–	FC Seoul	98	(12)

International career
2013–2015	South Korea U17	10 (Note: Includes one appearance against non-national team.)	(0)
2016–2017	South Korea U20	20	(2)
2017–2021	South Korea U23	11 (Note: Includes two appearances against another KFA team.)	(1)
Medal record
Representing South Korea
Men's football
Asian Games
Gold medal – first place	2018 Jakarta-Palembang	Team
- * Club domestic league appearances and goals as of 23:31, 24 October 2026 (UTC)

- Lee Seung-mo
- Hangul: 이승모
- RR: I Seungmo
- MR: I Sŭngmo

Lee Seung-mo (Korean: 이승모; born 30 March 1998) is a South Korean professional footballer who plays as a midfielder or forward for K League 1 club FC Seoul. He won the gold medal with the South Korea national under-23 team at the 2018 Asian Games.

== Club career ==
Lee started his career with Pohang Steelers.

He moved to FC Seoul from Pohang Steelers on 22 June 2023, traded with Han Chan-hee.

== Honours ==
FC Seoul

- K League 1: 2026

South Korea U23

- Asian Games: 2018
