= Cho Sung-hoon (footballer) =

South Korean footballer (born 1998)

Personal information
- Date of birth: 21 April 1998 (age 28)
- Place of birth: South Korea
- Height: 1.89 m (6 ft 2 in)
- Position: Goalkeeper

Team information
- Current team: Chungbuk Cheongju
- Number: 21

Youth career
- –2010: Jeonju Jochon Elementary School
- 2011–2013: Wonsam Middle School
- 2014–2016: Pohang Steelers
- 2017–2018: Soongsil University
- 2019–2021: Pohang Steelers

Senior career*
Years	Team	Apps	(Gls)
2021–2023	Pohang Steelers	5	(0)
2024	Suwon Samsung Bluewings	1	(0)
2025	Ansan Greeners	8	(0)
2026–	Chungbuk Cheongju	14	(0)
- * Club domestic league appearances and goals as of 6 August 2026

- Cho Sung-hoon
- Hangul: 조성훈
- RR: Jo Seonghun
- MR: Cho Sŏnghun

Cho Sung-hoon (Korean: 조성훈; born 21 April 1998) is a South Korean footballer currently playing as a goalkeeper for K League 2 club Chungbuk Cheongju.

== Career statistics ==
=== Club ===
As of 30 November 2021.

Club	Season	League			Cup		Continental		Other		Total	
Club	Season	Division	Apps	Goals	Apps	Goals	Apps	Goals	Apps	Goals	Apps	Goals
Pohang Steelers	2021	K League 1	4	0	0	0	0	0	0	0	4	0
Career total			4	0	0	0	0	0	0	0	4	0
