= Aleksandar Paločević =

Serbian footballer (born 1993)

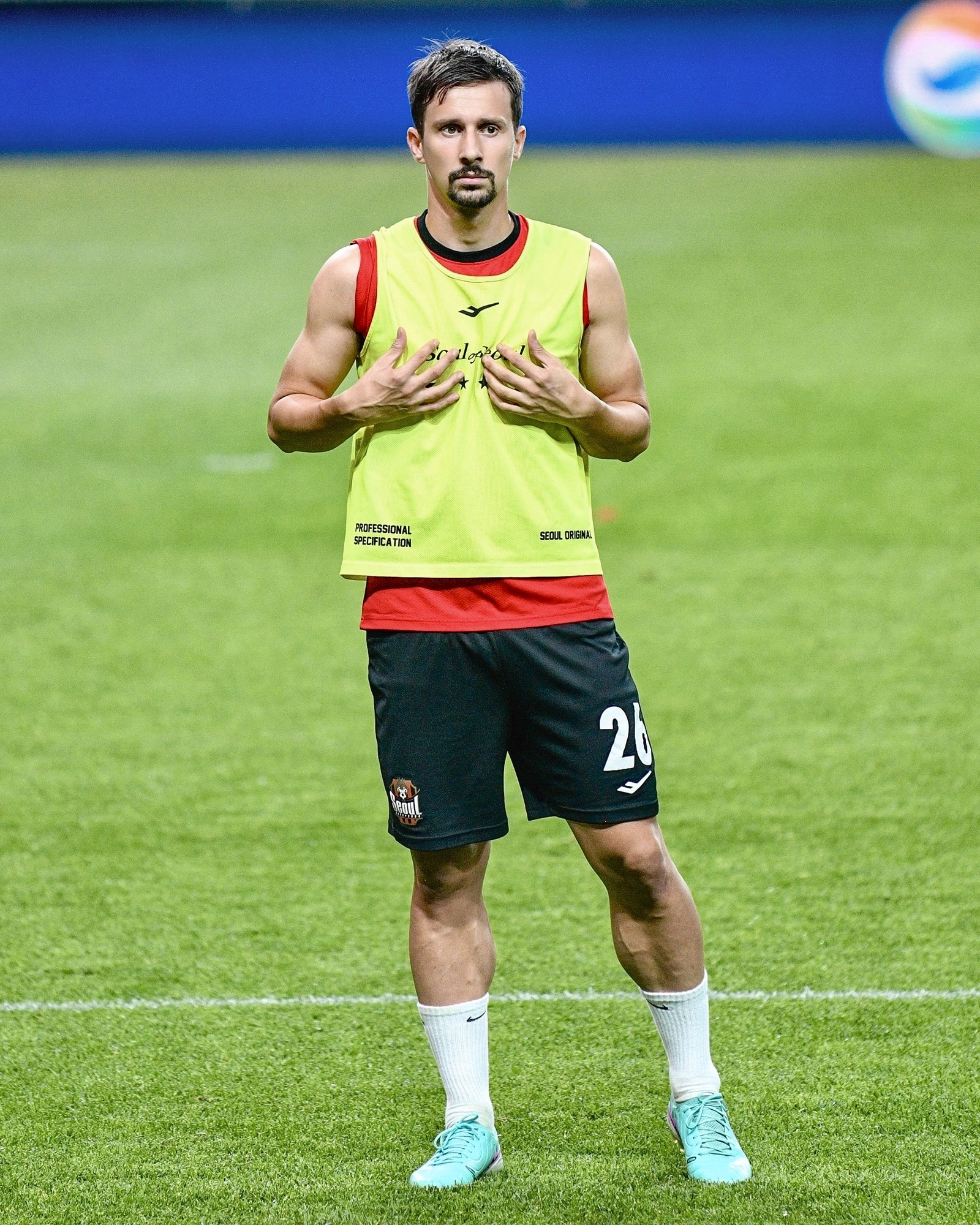
- Paločević in 2024

Personal information
- Date of birth: 22 August 1993 (age 33)
- Place of birth: Gnjilane, FR Yugoslavia
- Height: 1.80 m (5 ft 11 in)
- Position: Attacking midfielder

Team information
- Current team: FC Imabari
- Number: 26

Youth career
- 2007–2008: ŠF Vuk Paraćin
- 2008–2011: OFK Beograd

Senior career*
Years	Team	Apps	(Gls)
2011–2015	OFK Beograd	48	(4)
2011–2012	→ Sinđelić Beograd (loan)	23	(6)
2012	→ Voždovac (loan)	13	(2)
2015–2017	Vojvodina	61	(13)
2017–2018	Arouca	30	(4)
2018–2020	Nacional	24	(1)
2019–2020	→ Pohang Steelers (loan)	38	(19)
2021–2026	FC Seoul	128	(20)
2024	→ OFK Beograd (loan)	16	(3)
2025	→ Nantong Zhiyun (loan)	24	(7)
2026–	FC Imabari	1	(0)

International career
2010–2011	Serbia U18	7	(1)
2017	Serbia	1	(0)
- * Club domestic league appearances and goals as of 17 August 2026

Aleksandar Paločević (Serbian Cyrillic: Александар Палочевић; born 22 August 1993) is a Serbian professional footballer who plays as an attacking midfielder for FC Imabari.

== Club career ==
Paločević progressed through OFK Beograd's youth system, making his senior debuts while on loan at Sinđelić Beograd in 2011. He also went on loan to Voždovac, before returning to OFK Beograd in early 2013. On 27 May 2015, Paločević signed a two-year contract with Vojvodina. He was selected in the 2016–17 Serbian SuperLiga Team of the Season due to his performances in the process.

In the summer of 2017, Paločević moved abroad and joined the Portuguese club Arouca.

In July 2018, Paločević signed a three-year contract with Nacional.

In June 2019, Paločević joined South Korean side Pohang Steelers on a one-and-a-half-year loan.

On 18 January 2021, Paločević signed a contract with K League 1 side FC Seoul. On 24 July 2024, he left the club and was loaned to OFK Beograd.

== International career ==
Paločević made his full international debut for Serbia on 29 January 2017, captaining the side in a goalless draw against the United States.

== Career statistics ==
As of match played 1 November 2025

Appearances and goals by club, season and competition
Club	Season	League			National cup (Note: Includes Serbian Cup, Taça de Portugal, Korean FA Cup)		League cup (Note: Includes Taça da Liga)		Continental		Total	
Club	Season	Division	Apps	Goals	Apps	Goals	Apps	Goals	Apps	Goals	Apps	Goals
OFK Beograd	2013–14	Serbian SuperLiga	24	2	4	2	—		—		28	4
OFK Beograd	2014–15	Serbian SuperLiga	24	2	1	0	—		—		25	2
OFK Beograd	Total		48	4	5	2	—		—		53	6
Sinđelić Beograd (loan)	2011–11	Serbian League Belgrade	23	6	0	0	—		—		23	6
Voždovac (loan)	2012–13	Serbian SuperLiga	13	2	0	0	—		—		13	2
Vojvodina	2015–16	Serbian SuperLiga	27	4	2	0	—		8 (Note: Appearances in UEFA Europa League)	0	37	4
Vojvodina	2016–17	Serbian SuperLiga	34	9	4	0	—		8	1	46	10
Vojvodina	Total		61	13	6	0	—		16	1	83	14
Arouca	2017–18	Liga Portugal 2	30	4	1	0	2	0	—		33	4
Nacional	2018–19	Primeira Liga	24	1	1	0	3	0	—		28	1
Pohang Steelers (loan)	2019	K League 1	16	5	0	0	—		—		16	5
Pohang Steelers (loan)	2020	K League 1	22	14	2	0	—		—		24	14
Pohang Steelers (loan)	Total		38	19	2	0	—		—		40	19
FC Seoul	2021	K League 1	34	10	1	0	—		—		35	10
FC Seoul	2022	K League 1	38	5	6	3	—		—		44	8
FC Seoul	2023	K League 1	35	4	0	0	—		—		35	4
FC Seoul	2024	K League 1	21	1	3	0	—		—		24	1
FC Seoul	Total		128	20	7	3	—		—		148	23
OFK Beograd (loan)	2024–25	Serbian SuperLiga	16	3	0	0	—		—		16	3
Nantong Zhiyun (loan)	2025	China League One	24	7	0	0	—		—		24	7
Career total			405	79	25	5	5	0	16	1	451	85

== Honours ==
Individual

- Serbian SuperLiga Team of the Season: 2016–17
- K League 1 Best XI: 2020
