= Choi Young-jun (footballer, born 1991) =

South Korean footballer

Choi Young-Jun
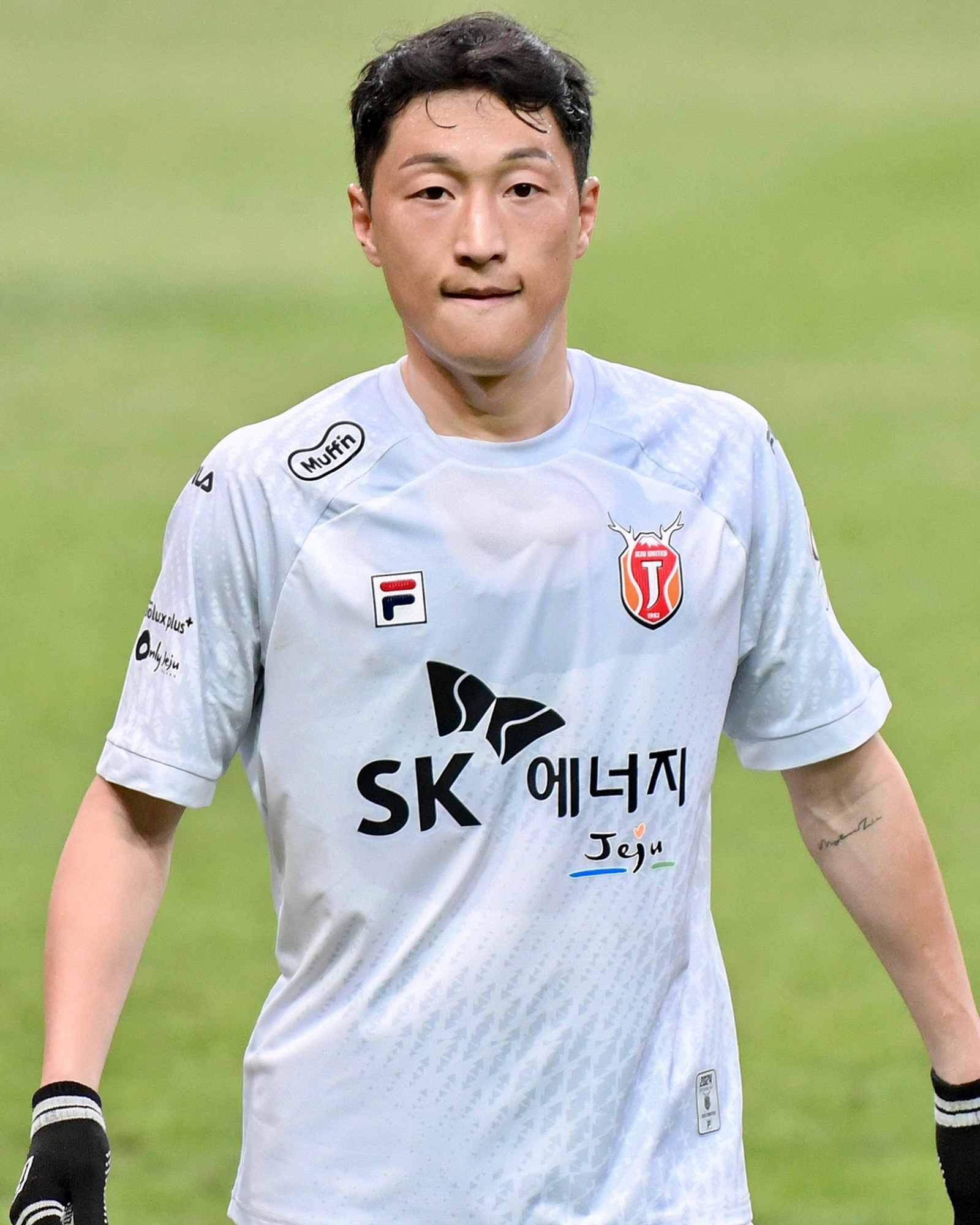
- Choi in 2024

Personal information
- Date of birth: 15 December 1991 (age 34)
- Place of birth: South Korea
- Height: 1.81 m (5 ft 11 1/2 in)
- Position: Defensive midfielder

Team information
- Current team: Yongin FC
- Number: 8

Youth career
- Konkuk University

Senior career*
Years	Team	Apps	(Gls)
2011–2018	Gyeongnam FC	158	(6)
2015–2016	→ Ansan Mugunghwa (army)	27	(1)
2019–2021	Jeonbuk Hyundai Motors	30	(0)
2019–2020	→ Pohang Steelers (loan)	37	(0)
2022–2024	Jeju United	57	(0)
2025	Suwon Samsung Bluewings	32	(1)
2026–	Yongin FC	18	(1)
- * Club domestic league appearances and goals as of 6 August 2026

- Choi Young-jun
- Hangul: 최영준
- Hanja: 催榮峻
- RR: Choe Yeongjun
- MR: Ch'oe Yŏngjun

Choi Young-Jun (Korean: 최영준; born 15 December 1991) is a South Korean football midfielder, who currently plays for Yongin FC.

== Club career ==
Choi was one of Gyeongnam FC's draft picks for the 2011 season. Choi made his professional debut on 5 May 2011, in a 2011 K-League Cup group match against Daejeon Citizen.

== Club career statistics ==
As of 31 December 2020

Club performance			League		Cup		League Cup		Continental		Other		Total	
Season	Club	League	Apps	Goals	Apps	Goals	Apps	Goals	Apps	Goals	Apps	Goals	Apps	Goals
South Korea			League		KFA Cup		League Cup		ACL		Other^{1}		Total	
2011	Gyeongnam FC	K League 1	13	0	1	0	4	0	-		-		18	0
2012	Gyeongnam FC	K League 1	35	0	5	0	-		-		-		40	0
2013	Gyeongnam FC	K League 1	18	0	2	0	-		-		-		20	0
2014	Gyeongnam FC	K League 1	21	0	1	0	-		-		2 (Note: K League Promotion-Relegation Playoffs)	0	24	0
2015	Ansan Mugunghwa (army)	K League 2	20	1	0	0	-		-		-		20	1
2016	Ansan Mugunghwa (army)	K League 2	7	0	1	1	-		-		-		8	1
2016	Gyeongnam FC	K League 2	3	0	-		-		-		-		3	0
2017	Gyeongnam FC	K League 2	31	3	2	0	-		-		-		33	3
2018	Gyeongnam FC	K League 1	37	3	1	0	-		-		-		38	3
2019	Jeonbuk Hyundai Motors	K League 1	7	0	0	0	-		2	0	-		9	0
2019	Pohang Steelers (Loan)	K League 1	14	0	0	0	-		-		-		9	0
2020	Pohang Steelers (Loan)	K League 1	23	0	4	1	-		-		-		27	1
Career total			229	7	17	2	4	0	2	0	2	0	249	9

^{1}Includes K League Promotion-Relegation Playoffs.

== Honours ==
=== Club ===
Gyeongnam FC:

- K League 2 : 2017
- K League 1 : 2021

=== Individual ===
- K League 1 Best XI: 2018
