= Lim Min-hyuk =

South Korean footballer (born 1994)

Personal information
- Full name: Lim Min-hyuk
- Date of birth: 5 March 1994 (age 32)
- Place of birth: South Korea
- Height: 1.86 m (6 ft 1 in)
- Position: Goalkeeper

Team information
- Current team: Jeonnam Dragons
- Number: 1

Senior career*
| Years | Team | Apps | (Gls) |
| 2013–2014 | Ulsan Hyundai Mipo Dockyard | 11 | (0) |
| 2014–2017 | Korea University | | |
| 2017–2024 | Jeonnam Dragons | 3 | (0) |
| 2024 | Shield United | 1 | (0) |
- * Club domestic league appearances and goals as of 26 November 2019

Lim Min-hyuk (Korean: 임민혁; born 5 March 1994) is a South Korean footballer who plays for Jeonnam Dragons.
